= List of lines of miniatures =

Miniatures for role-playing games or figure painting

Following is a list of lines of miniatures, produced by various companies for use with role-playing games, or for figure painting.

Set name	Publisher	Contents	Reception
Adventurers	Texas Miniatures	Adventurers were a set of 25mm metal fantasy miniatures.	Steve Jackson reviewed Adventurers in The Space Gamer, commenting that "The Adventurers, I'm afraid, rate only about a C. There's nothing actually wrong with them – but none are especially original or remarkably well-posed."
The Adventurers	Ral Partha Enterprises	The Adventurers is a line of 25mm fantasy miniatures designed by Tom Meier, each a 4" x 5 1/2" box consisting of eight pieces.	John Rankin reviewed The Adventurers in The Space Gamer No. 60. Rankin commented that "While The Adventurers are obviously aimed at those getting into the hobby, experienced gamers should also take notice. Everything you expect in the way of quality from Ral Partha is here, nicely packaged, and at a good price."
Alien Mercenaries	Grenadier Models Inc. for Traveller	Alien Mercenaries were a set of eleven 25mm figures including Vargr with Rifle, Droyne with Rifle, Aslan with Pistol, Aslan with Rifle, The Hiver, The Ael Yael, Vargr with Pistol, Droyne with Pistol, Centaur with Laser, Centaur with Rifle, and A Virushi.	Ed Edwards reviewed Alien Mercenaries in The Space Gamer No. 70. Edwards commented that "These figures help bring to life the descriptions in the sources noted. They are a definite must for the casual or serious Traveller."
Apocalypse Warriors	Ral Partha Enterprises	Apocalypse Warriors is a set of 13 individual bubble-packed figures, eight of which come with a weapons set that includes a modern weapon, primitive weapon, archaic weapon, and a bizarre weapon, which allows the gamer to adapt the figure to the campaign.	Bob Kindel reviewed Apocalypse Warriors in The Space Gamer No. 76. Kindel commented that "Their armor and clothing have an improvised feel that lends itself to the spirit of the games."
Beast of Burden	Martian Metals for Traveller	Beast of Burden is a 15mm Traveller figure consisting of one quadruped beast and rider.	William A. Barton reviewed Beast of Burden in The Space Gamer No. 47. Barton commented that "Overall, Beast of Burden will probably prove of more use in your Traveller miniature animal encounters than those figures in the earlier Aliens pack. I'd recommend adding at least one or two to your collection."
Call of Cthulhu Miniatures	Grenadier Models Inc.	Call of Cthulhu Miniatures were numerous sets of miniatures suitable for collecting or for gaming with Call of Cthulhu.	Frederick Paul Kiesche III reviewed Call of Cthulhu Miniatures in The Space Gamer No. 73. Kiesche commented that "I give these miniatures, despite my reservations, a hearty recommendation. These creeping horrors and the brave souls who fight them have definitely captured my interest and have started to gnaw at my soul." Kevin Ross reviewed the Cthonians and Tsathoggua packs of Call of Cthulhu Miniatures in The Space Gamer No. 76. Ross commented that "As there are no human figures among these releases (maybe in a digestive tract or two . . .), it would seem that these monstrosities will only be of interest to Cthulhu collectors and gamers. Those folks should be more than happy with these unearthly beauties."
Cardboard Heroes	Steve Jackson Games	Cardboard Heroes is a set of multi-colored 25mm fantasy figured printed on hard cardboard stock.	Martin Feldman reviewed Cardboard Heroes in The Space Gamer No. 38. Feldman commented that "they are beautiful, they are inexpensive, and if you like them and have no objection to cardboard, they are certainly worthwhile."
Cardboard Heroes Champions Set 3: Enemies	Steve Jackson Games	Cardboard Heroes Champions Set 3: Enemies presents 36 villains culled from Enemies I and Enemies II, scenarios in The Space Gamer, Hero Games' Champions adventures, and from the front of the Champions box.	Craig Sheeley reviewed Cardboard Heroes Champions Set 3: Enemies in The Space Gamer No. 73. Sheeley commented that "Enemies is a great set. Champions, being a movement game, needs representative counters for the heroes and villains, and the three dozen in the first Cardboard Heroes pack weren't enough. If you play Champions, or any superhero game using markers, this set is a must."
Celestial Dragon	Ral Partha Enterprises	The Celestial Dragon is a 25mm fantasy miniature, one of Ral Partha's series of Dragonscale tie-ins, and came with a container of metallic wax finish and a sponge applicator.	Dan Perez reviewed Celestial Dragon in The Space Gamer No. 75. Perez commented that "Overall, this figure is an excellent value for [the price], with or without the gimmicky rub-on finish. I attribute this to the incredible detail and high quality which has become a Ral Partha trademark. This is the type of miniature which could easily become the centerpiece of a collection."
Citizens	Martian Metals for Traveller	Citizens were released as a pack of twelve 15mm miniatures.	William A. Barton reviewed Citizens in The Space Gamer No. 40. Barton commented that "If you're a completest, you may even wish to pick up a set (no more than one) each of Citizens and Patrons."
Conan Miniatures	TSR	Conan Miniatures was a set of six 25mm lead figures that consists of an assortment of figures from the various Conan stories as well as the movies.	Edwin J. Rotondaro reviewed Conan Miniatures in The Space Gamer No. 73. Rotondaro commented that "If you are a Conan fan, or if you want some interesting figures for your collection, you might like this initial offering from TSR."
Cops, Crooks and Civilians	Steve Jackson Games	Cops, Crooks and Civilians are a set of 37 25mm cardboard figured painted by Denis Loubet, non-player characters for superspy, superhero, or other modern-setting role-playing game.	W.G. Armintrout reviewed Cops, Crooks and Civilians in The Space Gamer No. 64. Armintrout commented that "Where else can you find figures like these? And at this price and quality? Try them."
Crimson Dragon Miniatures	TAG Industries	Crimson Dragon Miniatures included 25mm scale figures that cover most of the character classes of D&D.	Edwin J. Rotondaro reviewed Crimson Dragon Miniatures in The Space Gamer No. 73. Rotondaro commented that "CDM's strength lies in the unusual figures they produce. [...] If you are looking for something different in 25mm miniatures, check out their line. They may have just what you are looking for."
Dark Horse Miniatures	Dark Horse	Dark Horse Miniatures was a line of 25mm figures. Dark Horse Miniatures was a miniature company formed in 1979 that moved to Idaho in 1981. In 1984, they obtained the first-ever license granted by the TMNT creators, to manufacture 25mm Teenage Mutant Ninja Turtles miniatures. They also took on other comic book-related licenses, including Groo The Wanderer and the Robotech license from Harmony Gold	Bob Kindel reviewed Dark Horse Miniatures in The Space Gamer No. 73. Kindel commented that "Dark Horse Miniatuers: the company that dares to ask, 'Is Idaho doomed . . . or just uncomfortable?' Check them out."
Destroyers II	Castle Creations	Destroyers II is a set of three 25mm metal figures for Villains and Vigilantes containing the supervillains Ratman, Shapeshifter, and Behemoth.	W.G. Armintrout reviewed Destroyers II in The Space Gamer No. 66. Armintrout commented that "Behemoth would be a great accessory for any collection. Shapeshifter and Ratman, while not of display quality, are good enough for game use. These figures are much better than they look in their pack - don't overlook this set."
Dinosaurs	Grenadier subsidiary Pinnacle Products	Dinosaurs are a set of nine 15mm figures, including Stegosaurus, Triceratops, Ankylosaurus, T. Rex, Parasaurolophus, and Protoceratops.	John Rankin reviewed Dinosaurs in The Space Gamer No. 65. Rankin commented that "For the gamer this set offers a lot of possibilities; a Traveller adventure on a prehistoric planet comes instantly to mind. Even in 25mm the dinos could be youngsters (but still dangerous), while Tyrannosaurus becomes the similar, but smaller Allosaurus. On a cost for value basis, this set gets the highest recommendation. As the best serious effort in this field in many years, Dinosaurs rates as an absolute must-buy for any collector of dino miniatures."
Dragon Killers	Grenadier Models Inc.	Dragon Killers were a set of nine 25mm lead miniatures released as part of the "Fantasy Lords" line.	Edwin J. Rotondaro reviewed Dragon Killers in The Space Gamer No. 73. Rotondaro commented that "All in all, Dragon Killers is the perfect thing for gamers who want a somewhat more exotic set of dungeon adventurers. I highly recommend these figures."
Dragonslayers	Martian Metals	Dragonslayers were released as twelve sets with each containing 12-20 15 mm lead miniatures of humans and fantasy creatures.	Kerry Gaber reviewed Dragonslayers in The Space Gamer No. 34. Gaber commented that "15 mm figures are too small for many FRP gamers, and the lack of repetition makes them less useful for fantasy army wargaming. [...] But, if you use 15 mm scale for your FRPG, these figures are for you." Dragonslayers & Travellers was awarded the Origins Award for "Best Fantasy or Science Fiction Figure Series of 1981".
Dungeon Fittings	Zodiac Castings	Dungeon Fittings were resin casts of standard items found in a fantasy RPG setting, including a pentangle on a circular piece of floor, a trap-door, the rim of a circular pit, a tomb and a large fireplace and chimney.	Ian Knight was not impressed by these, calling them "all pretty standard items, and there is little to recommend Zodiac over their better-established rivals."
Dungeon Raiders	Grenadier Models Inc.	Dungeon Raiders were a set of twelve 25mm lead miniatures released as part of the "Fantasy Lords" line.	Edwin J. Rotondaro reviewed Dungeon Raiders in The Space Gamer No. 73. Rotondaro commented that "Since the figures are somewhat specialized, I would recommend this set to collectors, or gamers who need unique versions of the standard D&D character classes, rather than to gamers looking for ordinary miniatures. Still, you can't go wrong with a quality set like this if you want a basic dungeon adventuring party."
EPT Miniatures	Tékumel Games	EPT Miniatures included a full line of Tsolyani, Yan Koryani and Mu'Uglavyani military figures; a number of friendly nonhumans, several unfriendly nonhumans, creatures, and more.	Frederick Paul Kiesche III reviewed EPT Miniatures in The Space Gamer No. 71. Kiesche commented that "Tekumel lends itself to beautiful miniatures, what with the elaborate costumes worn by the priests and priestesses and the detailed armor worn by the military. It is nice to see that Tekumel Games has been able to carry this beauty into the miniatures."
The Evil Lord	Ral Partha Enterprises	The Evil Lord is a set of 25mm miniatures that forms a scene that might appear on the streets of a fantasy city.	Steve Jackson reviewed The Evil Lord in The Space Gamer No. 41. Jackson commented that "All in all, a nice set. Not a lot of use in everyday play, but a great showpiece, and a good inspiration for a special encounter."
Famous Monsters	Heritage Models	Famous Monsters is a kit which contains 25mm lead miniatures, game rules and map and paint and brush to enable the beginner to play out a game with painted figures.	William A. Barton reviewed Famous Monsters in The Space Gamer No. 44. Barton commented that "I'd recommend this set to novice miniature gamers to whom the subject is of particular interest. Old hands might wish to wait for individual sets to be released."
Fantasy Lords	Grenadier subsidiary Pinnacle Products	Fantasy Lords is a boxed set with eleven 25 mm metal figures, eight colors of water-based paint, two plastic trays, a brush, and instructions.	Steve Jackson reviewed Fantasy Lords in The Space Gamer No. 62. Jackson commented that "Recommended, especially as a gift for a friend whom you'd like to start in the miniatures hobby." Edwin J. Rotondaro reviewed the Fantasy Lords Blister Pack Series released in 1984 in The Space Gamer No. 71. Rotondaro commented that "The detail and originality of these figures alone would make them a must for any serious collector of 25mm miniatures [...] If you use miniatures in your fantasy roleplaying, the new Fantasy Lords blister packs are highly recommended." The Fantasy Lords line was awarded the H.G. Wells Award for "Best Fantasy or Science Fiction Figure Series of 1986". Reviewed in Imagine #15 (June, 1984)
Fantasy Monsters	Grenadier subsidiary Pinnacle Products	Fantasy Monsters is a boxed set with eleven 25 mm metal figures, eight colors of water-based paint, two plastic trays, a brush, and instructions.	Steve Jackson reviewed Fantasy Monsters in The Space Gamer No. 62. Jackson commented that "Recommended, especially as a gift for a friend whom you'd like to start in the miniatures hobby."
Fictioneers	Stan Johansen Miniatures	Fictioneers were a set of 25mm figures and accessories for science fiction games.	Steve Jackson reviewed Fictioneers in The Space Gamer No. 32. Jackson commented that "Could be useful for the dioramist, or just the gamer who likes a control room to look real [...] Recommended for s-f miniatures play."
Folklore Creatures of the Night	Grenadier Models Inc.	Folklore Creatures of the Night is a boxed set of ten 25mm fantasy miniatures from Grenadier's Dragon Lords collection, and features monsters from popular folklore and legend.	Dan Perez reviewed Folklore Creatures of the Night in The Space Gamer No. 75. Perez commented that "All things considered, this is one of the best boxed sets in the Dragon Lords line, and is well worth adding to your collection. Despite the fact that some of these figures have been done better, they are, by and large, imaginative variations on their respective themes."
GI Assault Team	Pinnacle/Grenadier	GI Assault Team are a set of 10 miniature figures designed for RPGs, complete with weapons, grenades, packs, heavy mortars, and an infrared machine gun.	Michael Maloney reviewed GI Assault Team in The Space Gamer No. 65. Maloney commented that "Overall, this is a nicely-done kit with everything you need. It is worth its price for the figures alone."
Gnolls	Ral Partha Enterprises	The Gnolls is a set of four gnoll 25mm fantasy miniatures from Ral Partha's All Things Dark and Dangerous collection.	Dan Perez reviewed Gnolls in The Space Gamer No. 75. Perez commented that "I can heartily recommend this set of miniatures. It is more than worth the price, if just for the versatility afforded by the variety of poses and weapons."
Imperial Marines	Grenadier Models Inc. for Traveller	Imperial Marines were a boxed set of twelve metal 25mm figures including nine standing marines, two prone, and one Rocket Launcher, and a four-page scenario booklet.	Ed Edwards reviewed Imperial Marines in The Space Gamer No. 69. Edwards commented that "If you want 25mm figures for Traveller, other SFRPGs, or just to paint and display, then this set from Grenadier is well worth [the price]."
Imperial Striker Force	Martian Metals for Traveller in 1982.	Imperial Striker Force were released as a pack of twelve 15mm miniatures for Traveller. The Imperial Striker Force features figures in various poses with a variety of small arms, plus a miniature of the map box featured on the cover of the Striker miniature rules.	William A. Barton reviewed Imperial Striker Force in The Space Gamer No. 56. Barton commented that "Overall, the 15mm miniature enthusiast will probably find [this set] of use, as will Traveller players and refs who use the miniatures in their role-playing campaigns."
Journey to Sorrow's End	Ral Partha Enterprises for Elfquest	Journey to Sorrow's End were a set of 25mm-scale miniature figures including six standing adults, two children, and a horse and rider.	Gerard E. Giannattasio reviewed Journey to Sorrow's End in The Space Gamer No. 71. Giannattasio commented that "These figures are charming and offer a welcome change from the usual historically-inspired figures. The difference is between sword-and-sorcery and heroic fantasy, between an age of iron and an age of stone and bronze."
K'kree Citizens	Martian Metals for Traveller	K'kree Citizens were released as a pack of three 15mm miniatures for Traveller. The set features unarmed K'kree citizens of various castes, including one short-maned figure carrying a bowl.	William A. Barton reviewed K'kree Citizens in The Space Gamer No. 57. Barton commented that "For those who have an interest in them, these K'kree figures will be well received."
K'kree Military in Cloth Armor	Martian Metals for Traveller in 1982.	K'kree Military in Cloth Armor were released as a pack of three 15mm miniatures for Traveller. The set features K'kree warriors wearing cloth armor and carrying centaur-sized weapons.	William A. Barton reviewed K'kree Military in Cloth Armor in The Space Gamer No. 57. Barton commented that "For those who have an interest in them, these K'kree figures will be well received."
K'kree Military in Vacc Suits	Martian Metals for Traveller	K'kree Military in Vacc Suits were released as a pack of three 15mm miniatures for Traveller. The set features hexapedal alien K'kree warriors in vacc suits.	William A. Barton reviewed K'kree Military in Vacc Suits in The Space Gamer No. 57. Barton commented that "For those who have an interest in them, these K'kree figures will be well received."
Knights and Magick	Heritage Models	Knights and Magick is an extensive fantasy line consisting of packs of one to six 22mm fantasy figures, both general army types, and specific creatures and character types described in the Knights and Magick rules.	Spalding Boldrick reviewed the Knights and Magick miniatures in The Space Gamer No. 42. Boldrick commented that "Unless you are looking for figures specifically for a Knights and Magick game, there are better figure lines available. Only those figure types not covered by other lines are really worth acquiring."
Knights, Fighters, and Men-at-Arms	Grenadier Models Inc.	Knights, Fighters, and Men-at-Arms were a set of twelve 25mm lead miniatures released as part of the "Fantasy Lords" line.	Edwin J. Rotondaro reviewed Knights, Fighters, and Men-at-Arms in The Space Gamer No. 71. Rotondaro commented that "My collection of figures currently numbers well over three hundred, and these are the best 25mm knights that I have ever seen from any company. I recommend these figures to both fantasy and historical gamers, as well as collectors who want to own the very best miniatuers available."
Laserburn	Tabletop Games	Laserburn miniatures were a 15mm science fiction line designed for use with the Laserburn set of tactical rules.	John Rankin reviewed Laserburn in The Space Gamer No. 55. Rankin commented that "I do recommend the Laserburn line, but with this caveat – look before you buy. With Ral Partha Enterprises's vast retail distribution, this should not be difficult. While the figures are generally of excellent quality, the vehicles deserve close examination before you [pay] for one"
Lord of the Rings	Heritage Models	Heritage Models produced Lord of the Rings figures licensed by Tolkien Enterprises, including 25mm diorama sets, and 75mm Collector Personalities, Paint 'n' Play sets such as Mines of Moria and Helm's Deep, a rule set for fantasy miniature gaming titled Wizards and Heroes, and a separate Lord of the Rings Painting Guide.	William A. Barton reviewed Heritage's Lord of the Rings figures in The Space Gamer No. 34. Barton commented that "the models for the figures are those representations featured in the Ralph Bakshi The Lord of the Rings animated movie. If Bakshi's images of Frodo, Gandalf, and other Middle Earthers made you cringe, you probably won't be overly enthused with Heritage's figures. If, on the other hand, you felt the LOTR movie to be an apt portrayal, you should be rather pleased with the Heritage sets." Barton concluded his review by saying, "If you wish to fight the wars of Middle Earth on your dining room or gaming room table, Heritage's LOTR miniatures, augmented perhaps with figures from your other favorite lines, will give your campaign the most authentic "Tolkienesque" feel available."
MAATAC	Superior Models, Inc.	MAATAC Miniatures were released as packs of 2 to 4, 1:285 scale science fiction tank and robot models, designed for use with the MAATAC miniature rules.	Steve Jackson reviewed MAATAC in The Space Gamer No. 34. Jackson commented that "If you want alien-looking tanks, these are the best available."
Mercenaries	Martian Metals for Traveller	Mercenaries were released as a pack of twelve 15mm miniatures.	William A. Barton reviewed Mercenaries in The Space Gamer No. 40. Barton commented that "If you're into 15mm miniature use in your Traveller scenarios, you'll probably want to pick up a set or two of Mercenaries."
Miniatures for Traveller	Martian Metals for Traveller first in 1980.	Miniatures for Traveller were a line of 15mm miniatures, most of which contained twelve figures per set.	Forrest Johnson reviewed Miniatures for Traveller in The Space Gamer No. 32. Johnson commented that "All in all, a B plus effort. Recommended to Traveller fans and SF miniatures gamers in general."
Ninja & Samurai Adventurers	Grenadier Models Inc.	Ninja & Samurai Adventurers is set of ten 25mm figures in a box with foam insert, designed by Andrew Chernak for role-playing games.	Bob Kindel reviewed Ninja & Samurai Adventurers in The Space Gamer No. 75. Kindel commented that "The pieces are easily among the best that Mr. Chernak has crafted to date. From the traditional split-toes boots and exotic weapons of the ninja, to the classic poses and the ornate armor of the samurai, the collection is uniformly well-designed and executed."
OGRE/G.E.V.	Martian Metals	OGRE/G.E.V. is a line of miniatures that consisted of miniatures for Ogre and G.E.V.	Nevin J. Templin reviewed OGRE/G.E.V. in The Space Gamer No. 29. Templin commented that "My sample [of Ogre] needed a minute with a file prior to assembly. The G.E.V. is sharp and crisp, and requires a bit of assembly. The Heavy Tank is an impressive vehicle, nicely cast. The only other vehicle available is the Missile Tank, another sharply detailed casting." The OGRE series won the H.G. Wells award for Best Vehicular Model Series of 1979.
The Outcasts	RAFM Company	The Outcasts made up a line of 22mm figures that consists of nine personality figured, and two multi-figure sets.	Edwin J. Rotondaro reviewed The Outcasts in The Space Gamer No. 73. Rotondaro commented that "If you play Aftermath or The Morrow Project, if you need some strange aliens for Traveller, or if you just want some extraordinary figures for whatever system you use, check these miniatures out." Bob Kindel reviewed The Outcasts in The Space Gamer No. 76. Kindel commented that "The Outcasts, offered by Rafm, have a Road Warrior feel. Odd hairdos, primitive weapons, and little technological detail make them usable as reverted tribes/gangs."
Patrons	Martian Metals for Traveller	Patrons were released as a pack of twelve 15mm miniatures.	William A. Barton reviewed Patrons in The Space Gamer No. 40. Barton commented that "If you're a completest, you may even wish to pick up a set (no more than one) each of Citizens and Patrons."
Personalities	Ral Partha Enterprises for Elfquest	Personalities were a set of 25mm-scale miniature figures including seven humanoids and the very large serpent Madcoil.	Gerard E. Giannattasio reviewed Personalities in The Space Gamer No. 71. Giannattasio commented that "These figures are charming and offer a welcome change from the usual historically-inspired figures. The difference is between sword-and-sorcery and heroic fantasy, between an age of iron and an age of stone and bronze."
Personalities	Ral Partha Enterprises	Personalities is a line of 25mm fantasy miniatures designed by Tom Meier, each containing one to three pieces.	John Rankin reviewed Personalities in The Space Gamer No. 60. Rankin commented that "While one could do no better than to build a collection entirely of Personalities, the real beauty of the line is that each figure or small set is a stand-alone item. Each set provides the basis for either one's own character (the mounted and dismounted poses are a boon here), or for a unique encounter within a campaign setting." 25mm Personalities was awarded the Charles S. Roberts Award for "Best Fantasy or Science Fiction Figure Series of 1984".
Personalities and Things That Go Bump in the Night	Ral Partha Enterprises	Personalities and Things That Go Bump in the Night is a line of 25mm fantasy miniatures designed by Tom Meier.	Spalding Boldrick reviewed Personalities and Things That Go Bump in the Night in The Space Gamer No. 46. Boldrick commented that "The extensive and ever-expanding series has for some time represented just about the best available in FRP miniatures." Personalities & Things That Go Bump In The Night was awarded the Origins Award for "Best Fantasy or Science Fiction Figure Series of 1982".
Runequest	Martian Metals for RuneQuest	Runequest was a line of 25mm scale miniatures, bubble-packed sets of denizens of Glorantha.	John Rankin reviewed Runequest in The Space Gamer No. 57. Rankin commented that "Overall, the Runequest line is a very imaginative and well done offering. Considering how long Runequest players have waited for these figures, the line should enjoy considerable success."
Siege Equipment	Rafm Miniatures (beginning in 1982)	Siege Equipment is a line of 25mm miniatures from ordinary catapults and ballistas to obscure items like the crow and fire raiser.	Steve Jackson reviewed Siege Equipment in The Space Gamer No. 58. Jackson commented that "this is an attractive and authentic line. I recommend it without reservation to both fantasy and historical miniaturists. A siege is a siege, and here's what you need to win it." 25mm Siege Equipment was awarded the Origins Award for "Best Historical Figure Series of 1982".
Soldiers of Fortune	Steve Jackson Games for Traveller	Soldiers of Fortune are a set of 57 15mm cardboard figures painted by Jennell Jaquays, a complete science fiction beginner's set including twenty-five player characters, eleven Citizens, eight Soldiers, five Pirates, five Aristocrats and three Spacehands.	W.G. Armintrout reviewed Soldiers of Fortune in The Space Gamer No. 65. Armintrout commented that "If you want science fiction figures, start here. Cardboard is cheaper than metal - these will fill the gap until you can afford to upgrade."
Space 1889 Adversaries	RAFM Company	Space 1889 Adversaries included three sets: "Victorian Adventurers", "Soldiers of the Queen", and "Legions of Mars".	Tim Lester reviewed Space 1889 Adversaries in Space Gamer/Fantasy Gamer No. 88. Lester commented for "Victorian Adventurers" that "if you do play the game, these figures are highly recommended", for "Soldiers of the Queen" that "this is another wonderful set of figures to be uses in Space 1889", and for "Legions of Mars" that "if you play Space 1889 and you have a need for Canal Martians, these figures are exquisite."
Space Opera Ground and Air Equipment	T-Rex.	Space Opera Ground and Air Equipment is a set of detailed little future tanks based on the Space Opera designs.	Steve Jackson reviewed Space Opera Ground and Air Equipment in The Space Gamer No. 44. Jackson commented that "Altogether a remarkable first offering [...] Recommended, at least in small quantities, to any future armor buff."
Space Opera Miniatures	Fantasy Games Unlimited for Space Opera	Space Opera Miniatures is a set of miniatures in 15 mm scale; each set includes 10 different 15 mm figures for use with Space Opera as player characters of NPCs.	William A. Barton reviewed Space Opera Miniatures in The Space Gamer No. 49. Barton commented that "Generally, the Space Opera Miniatures are well-cast and quite suitable for role-playing use, either with Space Opera or mixed (for variety) with figures from other lines for Traveller, Star Patrol, Universe, or any other SF RPG or miniature system."
Star Frontiers Metal Miniatures	TSR for Star Frontiers	Star Frontiers Metal Miniatures included two sets of miniatures, "Robots" and "Federation Ships".	Steve Jackson reviewed Star Frontiers Metal Miniatures in The Space Gamer No. 74. Jackson commented that "Of the two sets, 'Robots' is my favorite; more imaginative, better executed, and a better buy for the money. But check out the ships if you like miniatures battles. They aren't bad at all – just unspectacular and a bit expensive. The combat system might be a good way to introduce a new player to the miniatures genre."
Star Trek - The Wrath of Khan	FASA for Star Trek: The Role Playing Game	Star Trek - The Wrath of Khan is a series of 25mm figures depicting the crew of the starship Enterprise.	Ed Andrews reviewed Star Trek - The Wrath of Khan in The Space Gamer No. 66. Andrews commented that "These figures are quite passable as gaming figures. Considering what they represent, and the fact that this is FASA's debut into miniatures, I wish they were exceptional."
Star Warriors	Ral Partha Enterprises	Star Warriors is a line of six 12-figure sets including Power Armor, Marines, Mercenaries, Armored Civilians, Aliens, and an assortment.	Steve Jackson reviewed Star Warriors in The Space Gamer No. 44. Jackson commented that "If you're playing science fiction games in 15mm, these are excellent."
Starline 2200	Task Force Games for Star Fleet Battles	Starline 2200 is a line of miniature ships, and each blister pack contains a lead cast ship, a clear plastic stand, paint guide, and color facing chart.	Ed Andrews reviewed Starline 2200 in The Space Gamer No. 66. Andrews commented that "The miniatures paint up nicely and, though they were intended for gaming, make nice collector's items. The castings are clean and flash is minimal and easily removed. Considering the quality of most castings today, Task Force is doing a fine job."
Starships	Superior Models, Inc.	Starships is a line of models intended for use with the Starfleet Wars miniatures rules.	Steve Jackson reviewed Starships in The Space Gamer No. 30. Jackson commented that "Highly recommended for space-miniatures fans - especially those who can paint well enough to do justice to the details."
Superheros and Supervillains	Heritage Models	Superheros and Supervillains is a 25mm miniature adventure gaming kit, which pits the four Knights of Justice against the Syndicate of Terror.	William A. Barton reviewed Superheros and Supervillains in The Space Gamer No. 42. Barton commented that "Though experienced miniaturists may wish to wait for these figures to come out in individual sets, superhero fans who wish to break into miniatures will find Superheros and Supervillains a solid introductory set, even for its [...] price."
Survival Force	Castle Creations	Survival Force is a set of six bubble-packs of three figures each.	Bob Kindel reviewed Survival Force in The Space Gamer No. 76. Kindel commented that "They are state-of-the-art, with good detail, minimal casting flash, and compatibly scaled size."
Sword Worlds Military	Martian Metals for Traveller in 1982.	Sword Worlds Military were released as a pack of twelve 15mm miniatures for Traveller. The Sworld Worlders are lower tech level troops with smaller weapons, and are clad in uniforms with beret-type caps.	William A. Barton reviewed Sword Worlds Military in The Space Gamer No. 56. Barton commented that "Overall, the 15mm miniature enthusiast will probably find [this set] of use, as will Traveller players and refs who use the miniatures in their role-playing campaigns."
Teenage Mutant Ninja Turtles	Dark Horse Studios in 1985.	Teenage Mutant Ninja Turtles was a set of four 20 mm figures based on the Mirage Studios comic book characters, the Teenage Mutant Ninja Turtles.	Bob Kindel reviewed Teenage Mutant Ninja Turtles in The Space Gamer No. 75. Kindel commented that "The concept of teenage mutant ninja turtles is, to say the least, funny/bizarre. But Ian Lungold, an artist whose sense of whimsy has led him to such acts as putting lederhosen on a treant, has shown admirable restraint. He has sculpted a formidable set of ninja. They may be turtles, but they're the meanest, most vicious turtles that I've ever seen. Like their comic-book counterparts, there's nothing comical about them."
Three Worlds	Texas Miniatures	Three Worlds were a set of 25mm metal fantasy miniatures, which initially comprised four types of medievally-armed nonhumans: lizard men, ursoids, wolverines, and a "Noehodes Bard".	Steve Jackson reviewed Three Worlds in The Space Gamer No. 71. Jackson commented that "Richard Kerr's Three Worlds line gets a B+ overall, with an A on some of the individual figures."
The War Machine	Ral Partha Enterprises in 1982.	The War Machine is a set of miniatures consisting of an armored battle wagon with a moving catapult, and nine orc figures.	Steve Jackson reviewed The War Machine in The Space Gamer No. 57. Jackson commented that "it's a lovely piece of work, and the finished catapult is an ornament to my collection. Recommended."
Traveller Figures: Adventurers	Grenadier Models Inc. for Traveller	Traveller Figures: Adventurers are a set of twelve 25mm metal figures plus two accessories, and a four-page 5 1/2" x 8" scenario-sheet.	Stefan Jones reviewed Traveller Figures: Adventurers in The Space Gamer No. 70. Jones commented that "I recommend Grenadier's Traveller figures to anyone running and SFRPG who'd like to add miniatures to his campaign. They're a good deal at the price and are well made."
Traveller Miniatures	Citadel Miniatures for Traveller	Traveller Miniatures is a line of 15mm miniatures, and five boxed sets of Traveller figures were released initially – Adventurers, The Military, Ship's Crew, Citizens, and Aliens.	Robert McMahon reviewed Traveller Miniatures in The Space Gamer No. 48. McMahon commented that "Compared with other Traveller lines I've seen, Citadel easily leads the field. These figures are excellent additions to a Traveller collection, particularly as they come in Traveller-sized boxes and include foam padding – essential, considering the way many people treat their miniatures. I heartily recommend these figure packs to all science fiction miniature enthusiasts."
Wizards and Lizards	Perth Pewter (subsidiary of Superior Models, Inc.)	Wizards and Lizards is a line of 25 mm miniatures sculpted by Ray Lamb that includes fantasy figurines, an Arthurian series, and a Norse Gods line. Although Superior Models went out of business in the 1980s, Perth Pewter and its inventory is now a subsidiary of Medieval Productions, and some of Lamb's figurines such as his Arthurian miniatures, are still for sale.	In the April 1981 edition of The Space Gamer (No. 38), Steve Jackson recommended this line of miniatures, saying, "These are beautiful figures — ip to Superior's usual quality [...] Detail and posing are excellent." Although Jackson thought the prices, at $4-$4.50 per figurine, were high, he concluded, "If you're into 25mm lead, these are a 'must see.' Even at these high prices, there will be some you'll want." The Wizards and Lizards line was featured in the pages of Dragon several times. In March 1981, Bill Fawcett rated the four miniatures from the WL07 Arthurian line very highly, saying, "You have to see this detail to believe it... excellent detail. The distinct facial expression and fine features are impressive... The owl familiar looks amazingly lifelike for the small scale." Fawcett didn't like the fact that the miniatures were packaged in plastic bags rather than hard plastic bubble packs, and recommended that buyers examine the figures carefully before buying, since "it would be a shame to have the high quality of these figures marred by shipping damage." In the May 1981 edition (Issue 49), Fawcett was equally as enthusiastic about WL06, a line of four wizards, using phrases like "expertly inscribed... a great degree of deeply etched detail... the features lend an air of intense concentration." In the February 1983 edition (Issue 70), Kim Eastland recalled that "For years Superior avoided 25mm fantasy figures, but when the company decided to get into that field, it did so with a bang. These three knights are excellent pieces... Note the plate armor, the realistic stances, and the detailed helms." In the April 1983 edition (Issue 72), Eastland was equally as impressed by Dragon #6, calling it "one of the finest dragons on the market... You couldn't ask for better detail on the wings, scales and face... A truly gorgeous figure."
Wolfriders I	Ral Partha Enterprises for Elfquest	Wolfriders I were a set of 25mm-scale miniature figures including four standing and four riding elves and four wolves in two different poses.	Gerard E. Giannattasio reviewed Wolfriders I in The Space Gamer No. 71. Giannattasio commented that "These figures are charming and offer a welcome change from the usual historically-inspired figures. The difference is between sword-and-sorcery and heroic fantasy, between an age of iron and an age of stone and bronze."
Zargonians	Bearhug Enterprises	Zargonians is a line of miniatures printed on thick, die-cut cardboard, rectangular counters that are held upright by plastic stands.	Denis Loubet reviewed Zargonians in The Space Gamer No. 29. Loubet commented that "Zargonians [...] are a fine substitute for those heavy, bendable lead miniatures. There are lots of different critters available, including several really obscure ones. [...] My heart goes out to the artist for tackling such a gargantuan task." Reviewed in Different Worlds #9.
Zhodani	Martian Metals for Traveller	Zhodani were released as a pack of 15mm miniatures for Traveller.	William A. Barton reviewed Zhodani in The Space Gamer No. 43. Barton commented that "If you're collecting the MM Traveller miniatures, add a set of Zhodani to your collection [...] But I certainly could have hoped for more than this. And I certainly will expect more from future sets, hopefully with Aslan and other Traveller aliens. You should, too."
Zhodani Military	Martian Metals for Traveller in 1982.	Zhodani Military were released as a pack of twelve 15mm miniatures for Traveller. The Zhodani pack features figures clad in the distinctive Zhodani battledress.	William A. Barton reviewed Zhodani Military in The Space Gamer No. 56. Barton commented that "Overall, the 15mm miniature enthusiast will probably find [this set] of use, as will Traveller players and refs who use the miniatures in their role-playing campaigns."
