= Knights and Magick (miniatures) =

Miniature line from Heritage

Knights and Magick is a line of miniatures published by Heritage.

== Contents ==
Knights and Magick is a large fantasy line in packs of one to six 22mm figures, presented both as general types for armies, and individual creatures and types of characters featured in the Knights and Magick rules.

== Reception ==
Spalding Boldrick reviewed the Knights and Magick miniatures in The Space Gamer No. 42. Boldrick commented that "Unless you are looking for figures specifically for a Knights and Magick game, there are better figure lines available. Only those figure types not covered by other lines are really worth acquiring."

== See also ==
- List of lines of miniatures
