= Cops, Crooks and Civilians =

Set of cardboard miniatures published by Steve Jackson Games

Cops, Crooks and Civilians is a set of cardboard miniatures published by Steve Jackson Games.

== Contents ==
Cops, Crooks and Civilians are a set of 37 cardboard miniatures in 25mm scale designed by Denis Loubet, depicting non-player characters for superspy, superhero, or other role-playing games set in modern times.

== Reception ==
W.G. Armintrout reviewed Cops, Crooks and Civilians in Space Gamer No. 64. Armintrout commented that "Where else can you find figures like these? And at this price and quality? Try them."

== See also ==
- List of lines of miniatures
