= Knights, Fighters, and Men-at-Arms =

Knights, Fighters, and Men-at-Arms is a set of miniatures published by Grenadier Models.

== Contents ==
Knights, Fighters, and Men-at-Arms were a set of twelve 25mm lead miniatures released as part of the "Fantasy Lords" line.

== Reception ==
John T. Sapienza, Jr. reviewed Knights, Fighters, and Men-at-Arms for Different Worlds magazine and stated that "Like the elf set, these figures are done in great detail of clothing and equipment, including heraldry on shields and one tunic [...] In addition to the great detail sculpted into each figure, this set offers accessories to be glued to figures as desired"

Edwin J. Rotondaro reviewed Knights, Fighters, and Men-at-Arms in Space Gamer No. 71. Rotondaro commented that "My collection of figures currently numbers well over three hundred, and these are the best 25mm knights that I have ever seen from any company. I recommend these figures to both fantasy and historical gamers, as well as collectors who want to own the very best miniatuers available."
