= Starships (manual) =

Starships is a 1980 game manual for Starfleet Wars published by Superior Models, Inc.

== Contents ==
Starships is booklet that functions as an identification manual for the Superior Modules starship miniatures for the Starfleet Wars game.

== Reception ==
William A. Barton reviewed Starships in The Space Gamer No. 43. Barton commented that "If you're really into the Starfleet Wars universe, you might find this manual a worthwhile buy for [the price]. Casual players - and those wishing to avoid arguments - might as well pass."
