= Call of Cthulhu Miniatures =

Line of miniatures published by Grenadier Models

Call of Cthulhu Miniatures is a line of miniatures published by Grenadier Models.

== Contents ==
Call of Cthulhu Miniatures were numerous sets of miniatures suitable for Call of Cthulhu.

== Reception ==
Frederick Paul Kiesche III reviewed Call of Cthulhu Adventurers and Call of Cthulhu Creatures for Fantasy Gamer magazine and stated that "I heartily congratulate Grenadier, consultant Scott Slingsby, and figure designers Andrew Chernak (Adventurers) and John Dennett (Creatures). Keep up the good work!"

John T. Sapienza, Jr. reviewed Call of Cthulhu Miniatures for Different Worlds magazine and stated that "The adventurers are dressed appropriately for the 1920s, which means you could also use this box for gangster or other adventure games set in that period. The creatures box could be used for any fantasy game for which you need new kinds of monsters."

Frederick Paul Kiesche III reviewed Call of Cthulhu Miniatures in Space Gamer No. 73. Kiesche commented that "I give these miniatures, despite my reservations, a hearty recommendation. These creeping horrors and the brave souls who fight them have definitely captured my interest and have started to gnaw at my soul."

Kevin Ross reviewed the Cthonians and Tsathoggua packs of Call of Cthulhu Miniatures in The Space Gamer No. 76. Ross commented that "As there are no human figures among these releases (maybe in a digestive tract or two . . .), it would seem that these monstrosities will only be of interest to Cthulhu collectors and gamers. Those folks should be more than happy with these unearthly beauties."

Call of Cthulhu was awarded the Origins Award for "Best Fantasy or Science Fiction Figure Series of 1983".

== See also ==
- List of lines of miniatures
