= Laserburn (miniatures) =

Miniature figures

Laserburn is a line of miniatures published in 1982 by Tabletop Games.

== Contents ==
Laserburn miniatures were a science fiction line of 15mm-scale miniatures designed to be used with the Laserburn tactical miniatures rules.

== Reception ==
John Rankin reviewed Laserburn in The Space Gamer No. 55. Rankin commented that "I do recommend the Laserburn line, but with this caveat – look before you buy. With Ral Partha's vast retail distribution, this should not be difficult. While the figures are generally of excellent quality, the vehicles deserve close examination before you [pay] for one"

== See also ==
- List of lines of miniatures
