= Cardboard Heroes =

Cardboard Heroes is a line of miniatures published in 1980 by Steve Jackson Games. An extension, Cardboard Heroes Champions Set 3: Enemies, was published in 1984.

== Contents ==
Denis Loubet designed a set of miniatures called Cardboard Heroes (1980), a set of 40 full-color 25mm cardboard figures for use in fantasy roleplaying games, published by Steve Jackson Games (SJG).

Cardboard Heroes Champions Set 3: Enemies includes cardboard miniatures for 36 villains taken from Enemies I and Enemies II, adventure scenarios published in Space Gamer and Champions adventures published by Hero Games, and from the front of the Champions box.

== Reception ==
Martin Feldman reviewed Cardboard Heroes in The Space Gamer No. 38. Feldman commented that "they are beautiful, they are inexpensive, and if you like them and have no objection to cardboard, they are certainly worthwhile."

John T. Sapienza, Jr. reviewed Cardboard Heroes for Different Worlds magazine and stated that "Cardboard Heroes are in 25mm scale, which allows them to be mixed with 25mm lead figures reasonably well. This means that even people who use leads for player-characters could use cardboard orcs, half-orcs, reptile men, etc., as monsters at little cost and effort, since they come pre-painted and ready to use. The major market for cardboard figures is the people who don't want to be bothered with painting lead figures, or hauling several pounds of leads around. If that describes you, then Cardboard Heroes deserve your attention. They are inexpensive and attractive gaming figures."

Craig Sheeley reviewed Cardboard Heroes Champions Set 3: Enemies in The Space Gamer No. 73. Sheeley commented that "Enemies is a great set. Champions, being a movement game, needs representative counters for the heroes and villains, and the three dozen in the first Cardboard Heroes pack weren't enough. If you play Champions, or any superhero game using markers, this set is a must."

== See also ==
- List of lines of miniatures
