= Traveller Figures: Adventurers =

Miniatures published by Grenadier Models Inc

Traveller Figures: Adventurers is a set of miniature figures made by Grenadier Models Inc. for Traveller.

== Contents ==
Traveller Figures: Adventurers are a set of twelve 25mm metal figures plus two accessories, and a four-page 5 1/2" x 8" scenario-sheet.

== Reception ==
Stefan Jones reviewed Traveller Figures: Adventurers in Space Gamer No. 70. Jones commented that "I recommend Grenadier's Traveller figures to anyone running and SFRPG who'd like to add miniatures to his campaign. They're a good deal at the price and are well made."

John T. Sapienza, Jr. reviewed Imperial Marines, Adventurers, and Alien Animals for Different Worlds magazine, writing:

These three boxes continue the higher quality in the Grenadier line that I have remarked upon in recent columns. They are well-sculpted in action poses and well-cast with only a reasonable minimum of flash left attached (which is easily removed with modeling knife). Although these were designed for use with Traveller, they would work nicely with most science-fiction games. Recommended.
