= Imperial Marines =

Imperial Marines is a set of miniatures published by Grenadier Models Inc. for Traveller.

== Contents ==
Imperial Marines were a boxed set of twelve metal 25mm figures including nine standing marines, two prone, and one Rocket Launcher, and a four-page scenario booklet.

== Reception ==
Ed Edwards reviewed Imperial Marines in Space Gamer No. 69. Edwards commented that "If you want 25mm figures for Traveller, other SFRPGs, or just to paint and display, then this set from Grenadier is well worth [the price]."

John T. Sapienza, Jr. reviewed Imperial Marines, Adventurers, and Alien Animals for Different Worlds magazine and stated that "These three boxes continue the higher quality in the Grenadier line that I have remarked upon in recent columns. They are well-sculpted in action poses and well-cast with only a reasonable minimum of flash left attached (which is easily removed with modeling knife). Although these were designed for use with Traveller, they would work nicely with most science-fiction games. Recommended."
