= Wolfriders I =

Wolfriders I is a set of miniatures published by Ral Partha for Elfquest.

== Contents ==
Wolfriders I were a set of 25mm-scale miniature figures including four standing and four riding elves and four wolves in two different poses.

== Reception ==
John T. Sapienza, Jr. reviewed Wolfriders I, Journey to Sorrow's End, and Personalities for Different Worlds magazine and stated that "Transferring beloved characters from two dimensions to three was a tough assignment, and one Julie Guthrie succeeded with very well. Anyone familiar with the series will have no difficulty identifying personalities in these sets. And considering the popularity of the series, I suspect a lot of non-gamers will be buying these figures simply for the pleasure of painting and displaying them."

Gerard E. Giannattasio reviewed Wolfriders I in Space Gamer No. 71. Giannattasio commented that "These figures are charming and offer a welcome change from the usual historically-inspired figures. The difference is between sword-and-sorcery and heroic fantasy, between an age of iron and an age of stone and bronze."

== See also ==
- List of lines of miniatures
