= Raid on Rajallapor =

Tabletop role-playing game adventure

Cover art by Martin Kealey, 1984

Raid on Rajallapor is an adventure published under license by Grenadier Models in 1984 for Flying Buffalo's modern-day espionage role-playing game Mercenaries, Spies and Private Eyes (MSPE).

== Plot summary ==
The player characters, a team of mercenaries, must first escort a Picasso painting to India, then steal a golden statue of Shiva. Pre-generated characters and maps are provided. The book also contains a solo adventure involving finding a microfilm hidden in a casino.

== Publication history ==
In the early 1980s, Grenadier Models was a manufacturer of fantasy miniatures. In 1984, Grenadier decided to diversify by creating licensed RPG adventures. During the year, Grenadier published four adventures: Cloudland for Advanced Dungeons & Dragons; The Horrible Secret of Monhegan Island for Call of Cthulhu; Disappearance on Aramat for Traveller; and Raid on Rajallapor for MSPE, a 48-page book written by Gary Pilkington, with interior artwork by Flint Henry, and cover art by Martin Kealey.

== Reception ==
In Issue 20 of Imagine, Nick Davison disagreed with the mystical element in Raid on Rajallapor, saying, "The scenario is well produced but I have my doubts about supernatural intervention, a device which also appears in [previously published MSPE adventure] Jade Jaguar. Perhaps the designers think this is an original way of shaking the players. But if it is repeated, surely it loses its impact?"
