= Destroyers II =

Destroyers II is a set of miniatures for Villains and Vigilantes published by Castle Creations.

== Contents ==
Destroyers II is a set of three 25mm metal figures containing the supervillains Ratman, Shapeshifter, and Behemoth.

== Reception ==
W.G. Armintrout reviewed Destroyers II in Space Gamer No. 66. Armintrout commented that "Behemoth would be a great accessory for any collection. Shapeshifter and Ratman, while not of display quality, are good enough for game use. These figures are much better than they look in their pack - don't overlook this set."

== See also ==
- List of lines of miniatures
