= The Outcasts (RAFM Company) =

Miniatures

The Outcasts is a set of miniatures published by RAFM Company.

== Contents ==
The Outcasts was a line of 25mm metal miniature figures — nine individual figures and two sets containing multiple figures.

== Reception ==
Edwin J. Rotondaro reviewed The Outcasts in Space Gamer No. 73. Rotondaro commented that "If you play Aftermath or The Morrow Project, if you need some strange aliens for Traveller, or if you just want some extraordinary figures for whatever system you use, check these miniatures out."

Bob Kindel reviewed The Outcasts in Space Gamer No. 76. Kindel commented that "The Outcasts, offered by Rafm, have a Road Warrior feel. Odd hairdos, primitive weapons, and little technological detail make them usable as reverted tribes/gangs."

== See also ==
- List of lines of miniatures
