= Starline 2200 =

Starline 2200 is a set of miniatures for Star Fleet Battles published by Task Force Games.

== Contents ==
Starline 2200 is a line of miniature ships in blister packs, with a lead cast ship and clear plastic stand in each pack, along with a painting guide and color facing chart.

== Reception ==
Ed Andrews reviewed Starline 2200 in Space Gamer No. 66. Andrews commented that "The miniatures paint up nicely and, though they were intended for gaming, make nice collector's items. The castings are clean and flash is minimal and easily removed. Considering the quality of most castings today, Task Force is doing a fine job."

== See also ==
- List of lines of miniatures
