= Star Trek - The Wrath of Khan (miniatures) =

Tabletop role-playing miniatures

Star Trek - The Wrath of Khan is a set of miniatures for Star Trek: The Role Playing Game published by FASA.

== Contents ==
Star Trek - The Wrath of Khan is a series of blister-packed 25mm miniature figures modeled on the crew of the original starship Enterprise.

== Reception ==
Ed Andrews reviewed Star Trek - The Wrath of Khan in Space Gamer No. 66. Andrews commented that "These figures are quite passable as gaming figures. Considering what they represent, and the fact that this is FASA's debut into miniatures, I wish they were exceptional."

== See also ==
- List of lines of miniatures
