= Fantasy Monsters =

Fantasy Monsters is a set of miniatures published by Grenadier subsidiary Pinnacle Products.

== Contents ==
Fantasy Monsters is a boxed set containing eleven scale model metal figures, with water-based paint in eight colors, two plastic storage trays, a paintbrush, and painting instructions.

== Reception ==
Steve Jackson reviewed Fantasy Monsters in The Space Gamer No. 62. Jackson commented that "Recommended, especially as a gift for a friend whom you'd like to start in the miniatures hobby."

== See also ==
- List of lines of miniatures
