= Space Opera Miniatures =

Set of miniatures

Space Opera Miniatures is a set of miniatures published by Fantasy Games Unlimited for Space Opera.

== Contents ==
Space Opera Miniatures is a line of 15 mm scale miniatures with each set containing 10 different figures intended to be used to represent characters for Space Opera .

== Reception ==
William A. Barton reviewed Space Opera Miniatures in The Space Gamer No. 49. Barton commented that "Generally, the Space Opera Miniatures are well-cast and quite suitable for role-playing use, either with Space Opera or mixed (for variety) with figures from other lines for Traveller, Star Patrol, Universe, or any other SF RPG or miniature system."

Ian J. Knight reviewed Space Opera Figures for Imagine magazine, and stated that "The range is nicely detailed, especially about the aliens' faces, full of character, and chunky in the currently popular fashion. The casting is crisp and largely flash-free. It will stretch your painting abilities to do them justice, but the results will stand proudly alongside the best of the existing 15mm ranges."

== See also ==
- List of lines of miniatures
