= Dungeon Drawings =

TTRPG Supplement

Dungeon Drawings is a 1981 fantasy role-playing game supplement.

== Contents ==
Dungeon Drawings is a book of illustrations representing a variety of dungeon scenery to depict rooms and corridors with appropriate furnishings and assorted debris.

== Reception ==
Denis Loubet reviewed Dungeon Drawings in The Space Gamer No. 41. Loubet commented that "Unless you have a game master who is VERY hard up for ideas I cannot justify the purchase of this play aid. The childlike graphics and cheapness of production make this set almost worthless."
