= Lord of the Rings (Heritage Models) =

Miniature figures by Heritage Models

Lord of the Rings is a set of miniatures published by Heritage Models.

== Contents ==
Heritage Models produced Lord of the Rings figures licensed by Tolkien Enterprises, including 25mm diorama sets, and 75mm Collector Personalities, Paint 'n' Play sets such as Mines of Moria and Helm's Deep, the Wizards and Heroes fantasy miniature gaming rules, and a separate Lord of the Rings Painting Guide.

== Reception ==
William A. Barton reviewed Heritage's Lord of the Rings figures in The Space Gamer No. 34. Barton commented that "the models for the figures are those representations featured in the Ralph Bakshi The Lord of the Rings animated movie. If Bakshi's images of Frodo, Gandalf, and other Middle Earthers made you cringe, you probably won't be overly enthused with Heritage's figures. If, on the other hand, you felt the LOTR movie to be an apt portrayal, you should be rather pleased with the Heritage sets." Barton concluded his review by saying, "If you wish to fight the wars of Middle Earth on your dining room or gaming room table, Heritage's LOTR miniatures, augmented perhaps with figures from your other favorite lines, will give your campaign the most authentic "Tolkienesque" feel available."

== See also ==
- List of lines of miniatures
