= Crimson Dragon Miniatures =

Detail from catalogue illustrating "Messenger of the Gods" figurine, sculpted by Chris Atkins

Crimson Dragon Miniatures is a generic line of miniatures published by TAG Industries of Castalia, Ohio.

== Contents ==
Crimson Dragon Miniatures included 25mm scale figures that can be used in fantasy role-playing games such as Dungeons & Dragons or RuneQuest.

TAG Industries went out of business in the 1980s, and its assets, including the Crimson Dragon Miniatures line, were purchased by Ravens Forge Miniatures in 1996.

== Reception ==
In the January 1984 edition of Dragon (Issue 81), Kim Eastland reviewed the first offerings in the Crimson Dragon Miniatures line, and commented, "this initial line is... impressive." He liked the sculpts, noting the "good detail and some nice touches (like the fighter mage's armor and magical sword.)." Eastman was also impressed by size of some of the figurines, saying, "What is most noticeable about the line is the company's fearlessness in casting big figures. The Messenger of the Gods is nearly 40 mm tall, and looks like he could be from some fantasy pantheon as he towers over most other figures."

In the May 1984 edition of Dragon (Issue 85), Eastland reviewed two of the company's fantasy dinosaur miniatures and commented, "For those miniaturists who love the unusual, TAG has created some fascinating creatures... A particularly nice touch is the crawling, lizardlike appearance of the Dragon, reminiscent of the old Lost World-type movies."

In the March-April 1985 edition of Space Gamer (No. 73), Edwin J. Rotondaro commented that "CDM's strength lies in the unusual figures they produce. [...] If you are looking for something different in 25mm miniatures, check out their line. They may have just what you are looking for."

== See also ==
- List of lines of miniatures
