= Disappearance on Aramat =

Role-playing game adventure

Cover art by Martin Kealey, 1984

Disappearance on Aramat is an adventure published under license by Grenadier Models in 1984 for Game Designers Workshop's science fiction role-playing game Traveller.

== Plot summary ==
An archaeologist and her team have disappeared while excavating ancient ruins on the uninhabited planet Aramat. The player characters are hired by the archaeologist's father to find out what's happened. When the team reaches Aramat, they discover ancient guardian robots and hostile corporate raiders.

== Publication history ==
In the early 1980s, Grenadier Models was a manufacturer of fantasy miniatures. In 1984, Grenadier decided to diversify by creating licensed RPG adventures. During the year, Grenadier published four adventures: Cloudland for Advanced Dungeons & Dragons; Raid on Rajallapor for Mercenaries, Spies and Private Eyes; The Horrible Secret of Monhegan Island for Call of Cthulhu; and Disappearance on Aramat for Traveller, a 48-page softcover book written by Gary Pilkington, with interior art by John Dennett and Flint Henry, and cover art by Martin Kealey.

None of these adventures attracted much attention, and Grenadier discontinued writing adventures.

== Reception ==
In Issue 20 of Imagine, Stephen Nutt was not impressed by this adventure, saying, "the module will need a lot of work to make it playable. If this is any indication of the quality of Grenadier's role-playing scenarios, then I would advise them to stick to figure manufacture."
