= Limited Edition Castings =

Miniature company

Ad for Thieves' Kitchen, Imagine #14

Limited Edition Castings was a British company that produced miniature figures in the mid-1980s.

== Description ==
During the height of the fantasy role-playing game industry in the mid-1980s, sculptor Jim Dendy began to design 25 mm miniatures for Limited Edition Castings of Hounslow. The company produced several sets of accessories under the "Shot Tower Fantasy" imprint. These included items from the interior of an inn, an alchemist's laboratory, a thieves' kitchen, and a Shinto shrine, as well as various fantasy figurines.

== Reception ==
In Issue 25 of Imagine, Mike Brunton reviewed several of the accessories sets and did not recommend them, saying, "I was not impressed by these pieces. A useful idea, to be sure, and maybe you could use one or two of the bits, but they are not essential to the games, nor particularly attractive."

Ian Knight reviewed Thieves' Kitchen for Imagine magazine, and stated that "The standard of sculpting and casting is well up to what's otherwise available on the market."
