= MAATAC (miniatures) =

MAATAC is a line of miniatures published in 1979 by Superior Models, Inc.

== Contents ==
MAATAC Miniatures were released as packs of 2 to 4 miniature models of 1:285 scale tanks and robots, intended for the MAATAC science fiction game rules.

== Reception ==
Steve Jackson reviewed MAATAC in The Space Gamer No. 34. Jackson commented that "If you want alien-looking tanks, these are the best available."

== See also ==
- List of lines of miniatures
