= Famous Monsters (Heritage Models) =

Famous Monsters is a set of miniatures published by Heritage Models.

== Contents ==
Famous Monsters is a kit consisting of fifteen 25mm scale lead miniatures, a 4-page booklet of game rules, a map, and 10 paints and a brush, designed for beginners to play a game using these painted figures.

== Reception ==
William A. Barton reviewed Famous Monsters in The Space Gamer No. 44. Barton commented that "I'd recommend this set to novice miniature gamers to whom the subject is of particular interest. Old hands might wish to wait for individual sets to be released."

== See also ==
- List of lines of miniatures
