= Superheros and Supervillains =

Gamin miniatures

Superheros and Supervillains is a set of miniatures published by Heritage Models.

== Contents ==
Superheros and Supervillains is a 25mm miniature kit for adventure gaming, featuring four figures each for the Knights of Justice and their enemies the Syndicate of Terror.

== Reception ==
William A. Barton reviewed Superheros and Supervillains in The Space Gamer No. 42. Barton commented that "Though experienced miniaturists may wish to wait for these figures to come out in individual sets, superhero fans who wish to break into miniatures will find Superheros and Supervillains a solid introductory set, even for its [...] price."

== See also ==
- List of lines of miniatures
