= Dinosaurs (Pinnacle Products) =

Dinosaurs is a set of miniatures published by Grenadier subsidiary Pinnacle Products.

== Contents ==
Dinosaurs are a set of nine 15mm dinosaur figures, including Stegosaurus, Triceratops, Ankylosaurus, T. Rex, Parasaurolophus, and Protoceratops.

== Reception ==
John Rankin reviewed Dinosaurs in Space Gamer No. 65. Rankin commented that "For the gamer this set offers a lot of possibilities; a Traveller adventure on a prehistoric planet comes instantly to mind. Even in 25mm the dinos could be youngsters (but still dangerous), while Tyrannosaurus becomes the similar, but smaller Allosaurus. On a cost for value basis, this set gets the highest recommendation. As the best serious effort in this field in many years, Dinosaurs rates as an absolute must-buy for any collector of dino miniatures."

== See also ==
- List of lines of miniatures
