= Dragonslayers (Martian Metals) =

Dragonslayers is a line of miniatures published in 1980 by Martian Metals.

== Contents ==
Dragonslayers were released as twelve sets with each containing 12-20 15 mm scale lead miniatures of humans and fantasy creatures.

== Reception ==
Kerry Gaber reviewed Dragonslayers in The Space Gamer No. 34. Gaber commented that "15 mm figures are too small for many FRP gamers, and the lack of repetition makes them less useful for fantasy army wargaming. [...] But, if you use 15 mm scale for your FRPG, these figures are for you."

Dragonslayers & Travellers was awarded the Origins Award for "Best Fantasy or Science Fiction Figure Series of 1981".

== See also ==
- List of lines of miniatures
