= Traveller Miniatures =

Role-playing game rule set

Traveller 15mm Miniatures
- Set 1 - Adventurers
- Publishers: Citadel Miniatures
- Publication: 1983; 43 years ago
- Genres: Science fiction
- Systems: Traveller

Traveller 15mm Miniatures is a line of miniatures produced by Citadel Miniatures for Traveller.

== Contents ==
Traveller Miniatures is a line of 15mm miniatures, with five boxed sets of figures consisting of the initial releases: Adventurers, The Military, Ship's Crew, Citizens, and Aliens.

== Reception ==
Robert McMahon reviewed Traveller Miniatures in The Space Gamer No. 48. McMahon commented that "Compared with other Traveller lines I've seen, Citadel easily leads the field. These figures are excellent additions to a Traveller collection, particularly as they come in Traveller-sized boxes and include foam padding – essential, considering the way many people treat their miniatures. I heartily recommend these figure packs to all science fiction miniature enthusiasts."

== See also ==
- List of lines of miniatures
