= The War Machine (Ral Partha) =

Line of miniatures published by Ral Partha in 1982

The War Machine is a line of miniatures published by Ral Partha in 1982.

== Contents ==
The War Machine is a set of miniatures consisting of an armored battle wagon equipped with a moving catapult, and nine orc figures.

== Reception ==
Steve Jackson reviewed The War Machine in The Space Gamer No. 57. Jackson commented that "it's a lovely piece of work, and the finished catapult is an ornament to my collection. Recommended."

== See also ==
- List of lines of miniatures
