= Space Opera Ground and Air Equipment =

Space Opera Ground and Air Equipment is a set of miniatures published by T-Rex.

== Contents ==
Space Opera Ground and Air Equipment is a set of detailed miniature figures of futuristic tanks based on designs found in the Space Opera role-playing game.

== Reception ==
Steve Jackson reviewed Space Opera Ground and Air Equipment in The Space Gamer No. 44. Jackson commented that "Altogether a remarkable first offering [...] Recommended, at least in small quantities, to any future armor buff."

== See also ==
- List of lines of miniatures
