= Cloudland (adventure) =

Role-playing adventure

Cover art by Martin Kealey, 1984

Cloudland is an unlicensed adventure published by Grenadier Models in 1984 using the rules of the fantasy role-playing game Advanced Dungeons & Dragons.

== Contents ==
In a role-playing adventure designed for beginning players, the player characters explore the towers and basements of the abandoned Cloudland Castle. Although the product is designed for use with the rules of Advanced Dungeons & Dragons, this is not stated specifically anywhere in the manuscript, since Grenadier Models was not licensed by TSR to produce AD&D products. Instead, Grenadier used the generic term "Fantasy" to describe the rules system.

== Publication history ==
Grenadier Models was founded in 1975 as a manufacturer of fantasy miniatures. In 1984, Grenadier tried to diversify by creating four adventures for various role-playing games: The Horrible Secret of Monhegan Island for Call of Cthulhu; Disappearance on Aramat for Traveller; Raid on Rajallapor for Mercenaries, Spies and Private Eyes; and Cloudland for AD&D, a 48-page book written by Tony Fiorito, with interior artwork by Flint Henry and Gary Pilkington, and cover art by Martin Kealey.

None of these adventures attracted much attention, and Grenadier discontinued writing them.

== Reception ==
In Issue 23 of Imagine, Chris Hunter thought the adventure was very poor, saying, "Cloudland from Grenadier Models Inc is appalling! It consists of a castle with five dungeon levels beneath it and is severely overcrowded with many different types of monsters who spend their entire lives sitting in their rooms waiting to be killed by adventurers."

In the March–April 1985 edition of Space Gamer (No. 73), Rick Swan agreed that the adventure would be terrible for long-time players, but thought new players would appreciate it, saying, "There's definitely a place for simple introductory modules for new roleplayers, and Cloudland fills the bill nicely. The same elements that make it a treat for newcomers, however, will make it a real bore for the experienced. Size up your own group and proceed accordingly."
