= Dark Horse Miniatures =

American metal miniatures manufacturer

Blister pack of Dark Horse miniatures from their "Groo the Wanderer" line

Dark Horse Miniatures was an American company that produced 25 mm metal miniatures for fantasy role-playing games in the 1980s.

== History ==
Dark Horse Miniatures was formed in 1979 to produce metal miniatures for the increasingly popular fantasy RPG market, including orcs, adventurers, elves, warriors, and monsters. The company started its own newsletter, Dark Times, for its mail order customers. Critic Bob Kindel noted that the newsletter "parodies, satirizes, and otherwise mocks more conventional house organs. It's a punster’s delight."

In 1981, the company moved to Idaho. Unlike other miniatures companies of the time, Dark Horse provided alternate weapons, accessories and even pets for their miniatures, cast on the same "tree" in order to save costs.

In 1984, Dark Horse obtained the first-ever license granted by the Teenage Mutant Ninja Turtles creators to manufacture 25 mm miniatures, and produced several lines of figures to be used with the Teenage Mutant Ninja Turtles & Other Strangeness role-playing game published by Palladium Books. Dark Horse subsequently obtained licenses for other comic book-related properties, including Groo The Wanderer and the Robotech franchise owned by Harmony Gold.

In 1988, Robert Bigelow reported that Dark Horse was out of business, and that Goldring Miniatures of Arcadia, California was using the Dark Horse logo and calling themselves Dark Horse's successor.

== Reception ==
In Issue 73 of Space Gamer, Bob Kindel thought the company had "an excellent line of well-crafted miniatures." Kindel noted that "Its human figures tend to be ordinary ... although they can rise to the sublime, as shown by the turbaned thief (reminiscent of Errol Flynn as The Thief of Bagdad), or the robed cleric 'armed' with turkey leg and ale tankard." Kindel preferred the non-humanoid lines, commenting, "It is with the nonhuman, non-orc figures that Dark Horse begins to shine. A line of fur-clad, mohawk-tressed barbarian elves, mounted and afoot, make a fine addition to any campaign. Tree trolls range from fearsome to humorous. The winged serpent is a true delight, and the Zwill is as horrible as it is delightful." Kindel also enjoyed Dark Horse's newsletter, Dark Times. Kindel concluded "Dark Horse Miniatures: the company that dares to ask, 'Is Idaho doomed . . . or just uncomfortable?' Check them out."

In Issue 4 of Fantasy Gamer, Steve Jackson noted that "Casting quality is good; there is very little flash [extraneous metal] ... sculpture is excellent and detailed." Jackson did find some issues with imagination, commenting, "Some of the individual figures are uninspired (the hobbits, for instance, are as boring as | expect a real hobbit would be). But others are quite original: The Swamp Demon and the Master Thaumaturgist belong in any serious collection." Jackson did warn that "Because of the fine detail, many of these figures don't look their best until they are painted — and a bad paint job destroys them. Withal, they are easier to paint than some I've seen elsewhere." Jackson concluded, "New miniatures companies appear constantly — and often vanish again, unnoticed. Whatever the final fate of Dark Horse may be, I'll say one thing — it won't go unnoticed. This new company has combined skill in production with humor and flair in promotion, it deserves to succeed."

== Awards ==
At the 1988 Origins Awards, Black Horse was a finalist for "Best Fantasy or Science Fiction Figure Series of 1987" for the "Groo the Wanderer" miniature line.

== See also ==
- List of lines of miniatures
