= Dungeon Raiders =

Dungeon Raiders may refer to:

- Fantasy Lords Dungeon Raiders, collection of models released by Grenadier Models Inc.
- Dungeon Raiders, a 2010 Nintendo DS game developed by Cyanide
