= Future Warriors: Kill Zone =

Future Warriors: Kill Zone is a 1995 game published by Grenadier Models Inc.

== Gameplay ==
Future Warriors: Kill Zone is a game in which a miniatures combat game features troopers, law enforcement, gangs, and scavengers.

== Reception ==
Guido Lawamba reviewed Kill Zone in White Wolf Inphobia #56 (June, 1995), rating it a 4.5 out of 5 and stated that "For a good-quality miniatures system, Kill Zone is an excellent value [...] So have some friends over, pour some tea, have a tasteful discussion about philosophy and the arts - and then pull out Kill Zone and pound the living crap out of each other!"

== Reviews ==
- Dragon #216
- Dragon #217
