= Fantasy Warriors =

Board game

Fantasy Warriors is a fantasy miniatures board game for two players that was published by Grenadier Models Inc. in 1990.

Original box art, 1990

== Gameplay ==
Fantasy Warriors is a miniatures wargame designed by Nick Lund that features battles between dwarves and orcs. It comes as a boxed set with the following components:

- 56-page rulebook
- Six groups of 17 unpainted plastic miniatures (three groups of dwarves, and three groups of orcs) totalling 102 miniatures
- 150 paper status counters
- reference card
- several 6-sided dice

=== Set-up ===
The players decide on a playing surface large enough to hold both armies, and how many points can be spent on each army. Players then allocate those points on a warchief and various units. Each player records the eleven different attributes and statistics for each leader and unit.

=== Opening sequence ===
Each player rolls dice to decide which side moves first. Each player has their warchief make a boast that will effect the morale of the warchief's army. For example, if the warchief declares that he will not be moved from his spot, his army will get a morale bonus as long as the warchief does not move.

=== Combat ===
The warchief for the first side issues orders to each unit to either Attack (charge into melee), Hold (stay in place), or Oppose (move to the best defensive position). The side then fires missile weapons, units that have been ordered to move do so, melee combat is resolved, and units check their morale. The other side then goes through the same sequence.

=== Magic ===
There are three types of spellcasters in the game:

- Priests can undo a dice roll, forcing the opposing player to re-roll.
- Soothsayers give bonuses to their army's morale checks.
- Wizards can spend points to cast magic from a list of ten spells.

== Expansions ==
After Fantasy Warriors was published, Grenadier Models gradually released several hundred new sets of miniatures that could be used to replace or augment the original groups of orcs and dwarves.

== Reception ==
In the January 1992 edition of Dragon (Issue #177), Mike Bethke thought this "was an excellent game to get people started in miniatures gaming." He felt the rulebook was clearly written and amply illustrated, with good examples given for each situation. He thought the miniatures were reasonably well cast, although he criticized each miniature for having "a very annoying stub of plastic in the middle of its back [that] must be carefully cut away." He wasn't enthralled with the paper status counters, which he felt cluttered the playing surface, and also suggested that players glue them to cover stock to make them sturdier. He concluded by giving the game an above average rating of 4.5 out of 5, calling it "an excellent buy at $30, even if all you want are the 102 figures."

In the next issue of Dragon (February 1992, Issue #178), Rick Swan called the game "a solid effort", and lauded the company for including so many individualized miniatures. He did feel that the combat rules were overly complex, especially for beginning players, but called the magic system "the most entertaining element of the Fantasy Warriors game." He thought the game would be much stronger with "more spells, imaginative scenarios [...] and judicious editing." He concluded by giving the game an average rating of 4 out of 6, saying, "There's still a lot to like, particularly in the boasting rules, what there is of the magic system, and all those nifty plastic orcs and dwarves."

== Reviews ==
- Casus Belli #62
