= Zodiac Castings =

Role-playing game supplement

Zodiac Castings was a British company that produced resin miniature figures.

== Description ==
Zodiac Castings, a company based in Liverpool, first started manufacturing fantasy miniatures in the 1980s. Unlike many other British miniatures companies of the time, they cast using resin rather than metal, producing 25 mm scale accessories such as fireplaces, pentagrams and tombs.

== Reception ==
In Issue 20 of Imagine (November 1984), Ian Knight found the resin-cast accessories to be competently made, but unimaginative, calling them "fairly routine [...] there is little to recommend Zodiac over their better-established rivals." Knight liked the fact that the pieces were cheap, and concluded, "No doubt Zodiac, like everyone else, will improve with experience and expand when their imagination takes off, and that may be worth waiting for."
