= The Sea Elves =

Fantasy tabletop role-playing game supplement

- Cover art by Lisa A. Free, 1985
- Designers: Elizabeth Cerritelli
- Publishers: Chaosium
- Publication: 1985
- Genres: Fantasy
- Systems: Basic Role-Playing

The Sea Elves is the final supplement for the fantasy role-playing game Elfquest, published by Chaosium in 1985.

== Description ==
The information in The Sea Elves allows players and gamemasters to design and play sea elf characters in their natural environment. In addition to various game-related statistics for both sea elves and sea creatures both friendly and antagonistic, the book describes the history, social structure, and the unique magic of sea elves. Three complete scenarios are included as an introduction to life as a sea elf: "Stormcoming Hunt", "Littlesmoke Island", and "Assault on Smalltower Island."

== Publication history ==
Although The Sea Elves is a supplement for the Elfquest role-playing game produced by Chaosium in 1984, Elfquest originally started as a comic book created by Wendy and Richard Pini in 1978. In the first issue of the short-lived Elfquest fanzine Yearnings in 1982, Elizabeth Cerritelli and Debra Vergriss introduced the concept of sea elves in the short story Siege of Suncliff Island. After Chaosium produced the role-playing game using the Basic Role-Playing system, several supplements were published, the final one being The Sea Elves in 1985, a 52-page softcover book written by Elizabeth Cerritelli, with interior illustrations by Wendy Pini, cartography by Carolyn Schultz Savoy, and cover art by Lisa A. Free.

== Reception ==
In the May 1986 edition of White Dwarf (Issue #77), Phil Frances found the supplement lacked much in the way of truly new concepts, especially criticizing the lack of creativity in the list of sea creatures, calling the majority "disappointingly derived from creatures in our own oceans. For example, furryfins are seals, manytooths are sharks, manyarms are octopuses, and stingfingers jellyfish." He complimented two of the three included scenarios, which he found a useful way to introduce players to the concept of the sea elf; but he thought the remaining one, Littlesmoke Island, "doesn't give much room for the players to manoeuvre, as the events are pretty much pre-determined, and the adventure as a whole needs a little extra from both referee and players if it is not to become a waste of time." He concluded by giving the book an average overall rating of 7 out of 10, saying, "The Sea Elves is a competent product, but the cover's proclamation of 'A Complete Culture for Elfquest' is misleading."

In the May–June 1987 edition of Different Worlds (Issue #46), Michael DeWolfe thought the three scenarios were "interesting and challenging." However, DeWolfe found several issues that had not been caught at the editing stage and commented, "Unfortunately, this supplement [...] looks rushed, with excessive glitches." He concluded by giving this book a rating of 3 out of 4.

== Other reviews ==
- The V.I.P. of Gaming Magazine #3 (April/May, 1986)
- Comics Feature #40
