= Zargonians =

Wargame miniatures

Zargonians is a line of cardboard miniatures for tabletop games published by Bearhug Enterprises.

== Gameplay ==
Zargonians is a line of miniature figures with full color pictures printed on thick, die-cut cardboard, and consisting of rectangular counters using plastic stands to hold them upright. They were intended to represent a large variety of characters.

== Reception ==
Denis Loubet reviewed Zargonians in The Space Gamer No. 29. Loubet commented that "Zargonians [...] are a fine substitute for those heavy, bendable lead miniatures. There are lots of different critters available, including several really obscure ones. [...] My heart goes out to the artist for tackling such a gargantuan task."

John T. Sapienza, Jr. reviewed the initial release of Zargonians for Different Worlds magazine and stated that "Bearhug Enterprises has introduced a major new gaming accessory. In my opinion, the Zargonian figures have the potential of introducing gaming with figures to many people who would never have used traditional lead figures. In addition, the Zargonians offer an inexpensive way for adventure garners to expand their present use of miniatures into gaming with major melees. Because of both of these factors, the Zargonians may be the most important accessory released this year."

John T. Sapienza, Jr. reviewed more of the Zargonians for Different Worlds magazine and stated that "These include the expansion of the concept of die-cut figures to its logical best use, making really large creatures easy to carry around."

== See also ==
- List of lines of miniatures
