= Elf-War =

Elf-War is a 1987 role-playing game adventure published by Chaosium for Elfquest.

== Plot summary ==
Elf-War is an adventure in which two adventure scenarios are presented that are set after the conclusion of the Elfquest saga. The player characters embark on an expedition to discover new lands and encounter other elves. The module introduces streamlined combat mechanics for smoother gameplay.

== Publication history ==
Elf War: Hubward Adventures on the World of Two Moons was written by Elizabeth Cerritelli and Sandy Petersen with a cover by Mark Bodé, and was published by Chaosium in 1987 as a 40-page book.

== Reviews ==
- Free INT (Issue 8 - Sep 1994)
