= Martian Metals =

Maker of metal miniatures

A 15 mm miniature of a K'kree warrior displaying the unusual hexagonal base favoured by Martian Miniatures

Martial Metals was a company that produced miniature figures in the 1970s and 1980s for science-fiction tabletop games.

== Company history ==
Martian Metals was founded in 1976 by Forest Brown to provide metal miniatures to the burgeoning science fiction role-playing and board game industry. Miniatures produced by the company had a distinctive six-sided base designed to fit the standard hex grid map used in many miniatures games.

The company became the licensed supplier of miniatures for science fiction games such as Ogre/G.E.V., Traveller, and RuneQuest, and rapidly became one of the premier miniatures companies in the RPG industry, winning several awards.

=== Shutdown ===
Martian Metals experienced rapid growth until a devastating fire in 1982 destroyed everything in the company shop except the master molds. The losses were covered by insurance and the company hired Bill Casper, formerly of the fantasy miniatures company Ral Partha, to get the company back on its feet. Casper's plan was to re-enter the market with more focus on the gift market and less emphasis on game miniatures.

However, the game publisher FASA had just acquired the rights to produce Star Trek metal miniatures, and offered to hire Forest Brown and his entire staff and move them to Chicago to create miniatures for FASA. Brown agreed to the offer, and Martian Metals was dissolved as a business.

As Matt Irsik recalled with regret, "[Martian Metals] was one of the up and coming companies in sci-fi wargaming. At the time [of the fire] they were just getting going."

Brown would later start up another miniatures company, Deimos Design Studio, that was active until his death in 2010.

== Miniatures lines ==
=== OGRE/G.E.V. ===
Miniatures for the Steve Jackson Games board games Ogre and G.E.V.. In Issue 29 of The Space Gamer, Nevin J. Templin commented that "My sample [of Ogre] needed a minute with a file prior to assembly. The G.E.V. is sharp and crisp, and requires a bit of assembly. The Heavy Tank is an impressive vehicle, nicely cast. The only other vehicle available is the Missile Tank, another sharply detailed casting."

=== Runequest ===
A 1982 line of 25mm bubble-packed sets of denizens of Glorantha for the fantasy role-playing game RuneQuest. In Issue 57 of The Space Gamer, John Rankin commented that "Overall, the Runequest line is a very imaginative and well done offering. Considering how long Runequest players have waited for these figures, the line should enjoy considerable success."

=== Traveller ===
Martian Metals produced many licensed lines for the Traveller.

==== Aslan ====
Twelve 15mm miniatures. William A. Barton commented that "The figures are nicely detailed, as usual with MM figures, and relatively free of flaws or flash."

==== Beast of Burden ====
A 15mm figure of a quadruped beast and rider. William A. Barton commented that "Overall, Beast of Burden will probably prove of more use in your Traveller miniature animal encounters than those figures in the earlier Aliens pack. I'd recommend adding at least one or two to your collection."

==== Citizens ====
A pack of twelve 15mm miniatures. William A. Barton commented that "If you're a completest, you may even wish to pick up a set (no more than one) each of Citizens and Patrons."

==== Droyne ====
A pack of twelve 15mm miniatures. William A. Barton commented that "The figures are nicely detailed, as usual with MM figures, and relatively free of flaws or flash."

==== Imperial Striker Force ====
A pack of twelve 15mm miniatures for Travellerfeaturing figures in various poses with a variety of small arms, plus a miniature of the map box featured on the cover of the Striker miniature rules. William A. Barton commented that "Overall, the 15mm miniature enthusiast will probably find [this set] of use, as will Traveller players and refs who use the miniatures in their role-playing campaigns."

==== K'kree ====
A pack of three 15mm miniatures. William A. Barton commented that "The figures are nicely detailed, as usual with MM figures, and relatively free of flaws or flash."

==== K'kree Military in Cloth Armor ====
A pack of three 15mm miniatures for Traveller. The set features K'kree warriors wearing cloth armor and carrying centaur-sized weapons. William A. Barton commented that "For those who have an interest in them, these K'kree figures will be well received."

==== Mercenaries ====
A pack of twelve 15mm miniatures for Traveller. William A. Barton commented that "If you're into 15mm miniature use in your Traveller scenarios, you'll probably want to pick up a set or two of Mercenaries."

==== Miniatures for Traveller ====
A line of 15mm miniatures first released in 1980, most of which contained twelve figures per set. Forrest Johnson commented that "All in all, a B plus effort. Recommended to Traveller fans and SF miniatures gamers in general."

==== Patrons ====
A pack of twelve 15mm miniatures. William A. Barton commented that "If you're a completest, you may even wish to pick up a set (no more than one) each of Citizens and Patrons."

==== Sword Worlds Military ====
A pack of twelve 15mm miniatures of Sworld Worlders, lower tech level troops with smaller weapons clad in uniforms with beret-type caps. William A. Barton commented that "Overall, the 15mm miniature enthusiast will probably find [this set] of use, as will Traveller players and refs who use the miniatures in their role-playing campaigns."

==== Zhodani ====
A pack of 15mm miniatures for Traveller. William A. Barton commented that "If you're collecting the MM Traveller miniatures, add a set of Zhodani to your collection [...] But I certainly could have hoped for more than this. And I certainly will expect more from future sets, hopefully with Aslan and other Traveller aliens. You should, too."

==== Zhodani Military ====
A pack of twelve 15mm miniatures featuring figures clad in the distinctive Zhodani battledress. William A. Barton commented that "Overall, the 15mm miniature enthusiast will probably find [this set] of use, as will Traveller players and refs who use the miniatures in their role-playing campaigns."

== Awards ==
Martian Metals won two industry awards for their miniatures:

- At the 1979 Origins Award, the OGRE series won the H.G. Wells Award for "Best Vehicular Model Series of 1978"
- At the 1981 Origins Awards, the Dragonslayers & Travellers line won "Best Fantasy or Science Fiction Figure Series of 1980"

== Reception ==
Martian Metals received many positive reviews in industry publications. Various reviews in the pages of Dragon used phrases like "quite distinctive", "a good range of armored and unarmored figures [...] Technical rating of 9/10", "Fantasy 15s series is excellent", and "incomparable 15mm Fantasy Line".

In a retrospective review written in 2011, Matt Irsik recalled that the company "had an extensive range of true 15mm figures for Traveller, plus they were heaven sent for sci-fi gamers of other systems as well. Crude by today's standards, at the time they were believed to be cutting edge."
