= Starships (miniatures) =

Starships is a miniatures line published by Superior Models, Inc.

== Gameplay ==
Starships is a line of models that were intended for the Starfleet Wars miniatures rules but can be used with any science fiction wargames or rule systems.

== Reception ==
Steve Jackson reviewed Starships in The Space Gamer No. 30. Jackson commented that "Highly recommended for space-miniatures fans - especially those who can paint well enough to do justice to the details."

== See also ==
- List of lines of miniatures
