= Fantasy Lords =

Fantasy Lords is a line of miniatures published by Grenadier subsidiary Pinnacle Products.

== Contents ==
Fantasy Lords is a boxed set containing eleven scale model metal figures, with water-based paint in eight colors, two plastic trays, a brush, and painting instructions.

== Reception ==
Steve Jackson reviewed Fantasy Lords in The Space Gamer No. 62. Jackson commented that "Recommended, especially as a gift for a friend whom you'd like to start in the miniatures hobby."

Steve Jackson reviewed Fantasy Lords for Fantasy Gamer magazine and stated that "I have no nits to pick with the dragon set; if you like dragons, these are good ones, The skeleton set, as it stands, is more for collectors or RPGers than for miniature battles — it is, in essence, a 'command set,' with a few infantrymen added. Perhaps Grenadier will supplement it with packages of the regular infantry figures, to allow the creation of a true skeleton army. I'm sure they'd find takers."

John T. Sapienza, Jr. reviewed the Elves of the Silvan Brotherhood figures in the Fantasy Lords line for Different Worlds magazine and stated that "Elves of the Silvan Brotherhood contains eleven figures in thirteen pieces, part of Grenadier's policy of including something unusual to round off a set. The standing elves offer something for everybody in the way of figures: one with mace, two with axes, two with bows, and four with swords of different kinds (shortsword, broadsword, bastardsword, and greatsword), plus a magic user, rounded off by an archer mounted on a unicorn!"

Ian Knight reviewed Fantasy Lords for Imagine magazine, and stated that "a very nice set; leaving aside the reservation that boxed figures usually work out more expensive per item than those bought individually, they are otherwise thoroughly recommended!"

Edwin J. Rotondaro reviewed the Fantasy Lords Blister Pack Series released in 1984 in Space Gamer No. 71. Rotondaro commented that "The detail and originality of these figures alone would make them a must for any serious collector of 25mm miniatures [...] If you use miniatures in your fantasy roleplaying, the new Fantasy Lords blister packs are highly recommended."

Mike Brunton reviewed Official Bushido 25mm Miniatures and Fantasy Lords for Imagine magazine, and stated that "Overall: Tick, VG, and recommended, for both Bushido and Fantasy Lords."

The Fantasy Lords line was awarded the H.G. Wells Award for "Best Fantasy or Science Fiction Figure Series of 1986 ".

== See also ==
- List of lines of miniatures
