= MAATAC =

MAATAC is a 1979 board game published by Superior Models, Inc.

== Gameplay ==
MAATAC is a game involving armored vehicles that the five empires which were introduced in Starfleet Wars utilize, and are the rules intended for the MAATAC miniatures line by Superior Models. Gameplay involved setting up a battle scape with small obstacles usually on a table top about three feet by five feet, then setting up whichever ships each opponent had of their respective fleet. Terran, Avarian, Entomalian, Carnivoran and Aquarian were the five fleets. Each had five classes of ships. Rules were simply to roll a dice to mandate movement, then roll dice for weapon range efficacy and damage severity, where the winner was the last ship standing.

== Reception ==
Alex R. Sabo reviewed MAATAC in The Space Gamer No. 34. Sabo commented that "Anyone wanting a set of SF miniatures rules incorporating armor, air, and infantry should consider MAATAC, at all times keeping in mind its simplicity."

== Reviews ==
- Dragon #29
- Science Fiction Review #33
