= Battlesuit (game) =

Board game

Battlesuit is a board game published by Steve Jackson Games in 1983.

== Gameplay ==
Battlesuit is a two-player combat board wargame set in the same future world as Ogre and G.E.V., concentrating on man-to-man battles between infantry in powered armor armed with weapons that launch micro-nukes.

== Reception ==
In the May-June 1983 edition of The Space Gamer (Issue No. 63), Craig Sheeley gave a positive review, saying, "Battlesuit quite accurately represents one hex of overrun combat from G.E.V., and is just as deadly. For those who would follow the progress of the world of 2085, this game is a must."

In the June 1984 edition of Dragon (Issue #86), Jerry Epperson praised the tactics which made it "a game of cat-and-mouse as both players feint and probe, looking for weaknesses in the opponent's force." Epperson's only concern was the programmed morale checks, which he felt didn't reflect the humanity and varying personalities of the soldiers. Epperson concluded, "Nitpicking aside, Battlesuit is a fun little game. Those who are looking for a 'realistic' simulation will be disappointed, but if you like 'shoot-‘em-up' games, this one fills the bill well."
