= Elfquest (role-playing game) =

1984 Fantasy tabletop role-playing game

The Official Roleplaying Game
- First edition cover illustration by Wendi Pini.
- Designers: Steve Perrin; Sandy Petersen; Yurek Chodak
- Publishers: Chaosium
- Publication: 1984
- Genres: Fantasy
- Systems: Basic Role-Playing

Elfquest is a fantasy role-playing game published by Chaosium in 1984 that is based on Wendy and Richard Pini's Elfquest series of comics.

== Description ==
The game uses the same setting as the comics, the World of Two Moons. Players can either choose to take on the roles of elves from the comics including Cutter, Skywise, and Redlance; or they can design their own characters, providing them with skills taken from a short list including Troll Lore and Wolf Riding.

== Publication history ==
Wendy and Richard Pini created the Elfquest comic in 1978, a fantasy story about a community of elves called the Wolfriders and other fictional species who struggle to survive and coexist on the primitive Earth-like planet World of Two Moons. Chaosium acquired the role-playing game license, and Steve Perrin, Sandy Petersen, and Yurek Chodak created the first edition in 1984. The boxed set contained a 72-page players' book, a 36-page gamemaster book, a map of the world, character sheets, and dice.

Chaosium subsequently produced several supplements over the next four years, including:

- The Elfquest Companion (1985). Includes random character generation tables. This supplement was included in the paperback second edition.
- The Sea Elves (1985). Introduced information and art provided by the Pinis describing the Sea Elf tribe before they appeared in the comics.
- Elf-War (1987). Contains several adventures outside of the comic-book continuity.
- Elfquest (1989). The second edition, published as a paperback book.

Elfquest did not sell nearly as well as hoped. One of the game's creators, Sandy Petersen, who worked at Chaosium at the time Elfquest was developed, pointed out that Elfquest was given to the same game developer as the new edition of Runequest that was being worked on at the same time. Petersen believed that Elfquest was used as a 'test bed' for complex game mechanics that were going to be used in Runequest. Petersen speculated that this caused parts of Elfquest to be much more complex than fans of the comics were likely prepared for.

=== Miniatures ===
Ral Partha released several 25 mm miniature figures for Elfquest:

- "Wolfriders I": Four standing and four riding elves and four wolves in two different poses.
- "Journey to Sorrow's End": Six standing adults, two children, and a horse and rider.
- "Personalities": Seven humanoids and the very large serpent Madcoil. William A. Barton, writing in Issue 71 of Space Gamer, called these figures "charming and offer a welcome change from the usual historically-inspired figures. The difference is between sword-and-sorcery and heroic fantasy, between an age of iron and an age of stone and bronze."

== Reception ==
Rick Swan reviewed Elfquest for Fantasy Gamer magazine and stated that "Familiarity with the original Elfquest is just about a prerequisite for complete enjoyment of the game. Check out the books first (and since they're a delight, you won't be sorry). For those who are already fans of Elfquest, waste no time in investing in a copy of the game."

In Issue 60 of White Dwarf, Murray Writtle was impressed, noting "The game, utilising the simplicity of the RuneQuest characteristics and skills system, concentrates squarely on storytelling and the creation of atmosphere." Writtle did warn that "This is not a game for the traditional wargamer, who will find a lack of emphasis on tactical or combat skills, which are relegated to the last section of the players' book." Writtle concluded by giving the game an excellent rating of 9 out of 10, saying, "This is really the nicest RPG I have seen to give someone as a present. It would suit especially a new player or the parents of young children, who will undoubtedly love the elves wholeheartedly, but also any player who really cares about The Story."

Michael DeWolfe reviewed Elfquest for Different Worlds magazine and stated that "For the gamer: this is a change of pace from normal role-playing games. It doesn't focus on powerful sorcerers and multi-racial parties, nor does it involve towns and ancient castles. the setting is new but may become boring for not a few. A suggestion: don't worry about rewriting the comic with your exploits, just don't rewrite the setting or logic of the world. Elfquest is a good game in most facets and can be recommended."

In his 1990 book The Complete Guide to Role-Playing Games, game critic Rick Swan called this "an engaging blend of high adventure and whimsy." Swan found the game "easy to learn, thanks to the clear rules by Steve Perrin, liberally illustrated with excerpts from the original comics." Swan noted that the game rules stated that combat is "contrary to the spirit of the story" and was therefore puzzled that an uncharacteristically complex combat system took up twenty pages of the rule book. He also warned that, for traditional role-play gamers, "Monsters are scarce, and magic barely exists, very disappointing in a fantasy game and not particularly exciting." And he commented that players might find themselves at a loss for what to do, since the rulebooks "aren't much help, offering only sketchy adventure situations that do little more than illustrate specific portions of the rules." Swan concluded by giving the game a rating of 2.5 out of 4, saying, "The problems with Elfquest have more to do with the limits set by the comic books than with the game itself. Fans of the comics will have a ball replaying their favorite sequences. Others should check out the comics first."

James Nicoll in 2020 for Black Gate wrote, "Steve Perrin, Sandy Peterson, and Yurek Chodak's Elfquest, set in the world of Wendy and Richard Pini's Elfquest, an independent comic that had been running since the 1970s. I was not a particular fan of Elfquest as I did not care for the art [...] but — this was a Chaosium product which meant I could scavenge elements for other BRP games." In 2024, he added, "[ElfQuest] the RPG wasn't hugely successful. Nobody actually complained about it. They just didn't buy it in the first place. Tie-ins are a gamble."
