= Ogre (video game) =

1986 video game

- Apple II cover art
- Developer: Origin Systems
- Publisher: Origin Systems
- Platforms: Apple II, Amiga, Atari 8-bit, Atari ST, Commodore 64, MS-DOS, Mac
- Release: 1986

Ogre is a 1986 video game based on the Ogre board wargame. It was released by Origin Systems for the Apple II, Amiga, Atari 8-bit computers, Atari ST, Commodore 64, MS-DOS, and Mac.

== Reception ==
Reception

Review score
Publication	Score
Computer Gaming World	2.5/5

inCider in 1986 rated Ogre with three stars out of four. Info gave the Commodore 64 version three-plus stars out of five, stating that "the real fun is you against the computer" despite the "limited" graphics and sound. The magazine approved of the user interface, and recommended the "very nice" game to those new to battle simulations. M. Evan Brooks reviewed the game for Computer Gaming World, and stated that "even though Ogre is a faithful adaptation of its parent boardgame, has adequate graphics, and can be fun, it isn't the bargain [...] that the boardgame was".

Computer Gaming World rated Ogre three stars out of five in a 1992 survey of science fiction games and two-plus stars in a 1994 survey, and ranked it #130 in the magazine's 1996 list of 150 Best Games of All Time.

Tim Robinson reviewed Ogre in Space Gamer/Fantasy Gamer No. 81. Robinson commented that "This is a great game, well worth buying and playing extensively. The computer Ogre is great competition and there are options to play against a human opponent. I can highly recommend this game."
