= Enemies (Champions) =

Role-playing game supplement

Enemies is a 1981 role-playing game supplement published by Hero Games for Champions.

== Contents ==
Enemies is a supplement which includes game statistics and illustrations for 36 villains with different levels of expertise and intent.

== Reception ==
Aaron Allston reviewed Enemies in The Space Gamer No. 47. Allston commented that "Buyers wanting to see interesting and useful applications of Champions character-building would do well to pick this up."

Russell Grant Collins reviewed Enemies and Enemies II for Different Worlds magazine and stated that "One slight problem - these villains, despite what it says in the introduction to Enemies, are not quite accurate to the changes made in the second edition rulebook. The gamemaster will either have to fiddle with the powers to make them fit [...] or he can simply ignore costs as given and increase Villain Bonuses accordingly. Even with this drawback [...] I still recommend these supplements to every Champions gamemaster who does not have unlimited time to create his own foes for the players."

Pete Tamlyn reviewed Enemies I for Imagine magazine, and stated that "the designers manage to demonstrate their awareness of the importance of atmosphere by giving each character an interesting background. Even so I would not normally recommend anyone with a decent imagination to bother with this, were it not for the fact that the villains get used elsewhere."
