= Knights and Magick =

Tabletop role-playing game

Knights and Magick is a role-playing game published by Heritage USA in 1980.

== Description ==
Knights and Magick is a fantasy/medieval miniatures system designed for mass or single combat, in individual battles or large political-economic-military campaigns. The game includes rudimentary role-playing rules, magic spells, and guidelines for use with other RPGs.

== Publication history ==
The Knights and Magick Rules Set was designed by Arnold Hendrick and published by Heritage USA in 1980 as a boxed set containing three 48-page books and a 32-page book, a digest-sized 16-page pamphlet, and a reference sheet.

== Reception ==
Aaron Allston reviewed Knights & Magick in The Space Gamer No. 35. Allston commented that "Overall, I would guardedly recommend Knights & Magick, but not to straight FRP gamers; they would find little of use. Fantasy and historical miniatures gamers will find some innovation and a good deal of resource material."

Clayton Miner reviewed Knights and Magick for Pegasus magazine and stated that "The entire project has been put together with an eye towards maintaining a concise and interesting rules set with a lot of appeal and high playability. When all put together, Knights and Magick tm has a flavor similar to Chivalry and Sorcery, with a lot of fun mixed in."

Lawrence Schick felt that the game was "Designed mainly to sell Heritage miniatures".

Marco Arnaudo in the book Storytelling in the Modern Board Game: Narrative Trends from the Late 1960s to Today said that Knights & Magick "appeared to connect the narrative lessons learned by hobby board games of the late 1970s with the conventions of miniature wargaming that had given birth to D&D. Knights & Magick consists of three volumes of rules for miniature combat set in a world of high fantasy, but its extensive world-building, story-oriented approach, and numerous possibilities for customization, give the design a very strong role-playing feel."
