= Denis Loubet =

Artist

Denis Loubet is an artist who has worked on several pen-and-paper role-playing games and video games, including the MMORPG Ashen Empires.

== Career ==
Loubet designed a set of miniatures called Cardboard Heroes (1980), featuring full-color cardboard figures intended for use with fantasy roleplaying games, published by Steve Jackson Games. Loubet, Jennell Jaquays (Note: Credited as Paul Jaquays.), and Jeff Dee produced several more Cardboard Heroes sets. Richard Garriott commissioned Loubet to paint the cover of Ultima I (1980), and Loubet painted many other covers for games by Garriott thereafter.

== Atheism ==
Loubet is an active member of the Atheist Community of Austin and has appeared regularly on the live internet radio show The Non-Prophets.

== Works ==
=== Origin Systems ===
Cover art, documentation illustrations, tile graphics, 3D sprite and model animations, 3D cinematic animations, etc.

- Akalabeth: World of Doom (AKA "Ultima 0"; actually published prior to the foundation of Origin Systems)
- Ultima I
- Ultima III: Exodus
- Ultima IV: Quest of the Avatar
- Ultima V: Warriors of Destiny
- Ultima VI: The False Prophet
- Ultima VII: The Black Gate
- Ultima VII Part Two: Serpent Isle
- Ultima VIII: Pagan
- Ultima IX: Ascension
- Ultima Online
- Worlds of Ultima: Savage Empire
- Worlds of Ultima: Martian Dreams
- Ultima Underworld: The Stygian Abyss
- Ultima Underworld II: Labyrinth of Worlds
- Ultima: Runes of Virtue
- Wing Commander
- Wing Commander II
- Wing Commander: The Secret Missions
- Wing Commander: Secret Missions II
- Strike Commander
- Crusader: No Remorse
- Autoduel
- Ogre
- Tangled Tales
- Omega
- Bad Blood
- Knights of Legend
- Times of Lore
- Deus Ex: The Conspiracy

=== Pixelmine Games ===
Co-owner: Promotional and In-Game art and animation

- Ashen Empires
- Dransik
- Underworlds
- Underworlds 2
- Super Collider

=== Pen & Paper RPGs ===
Cover art, interior art.

- GURPS
- Hero Games
- Car Wars
- Ogre
- G.E.V.
- Cardboard Heroes
- Killer
- Space Gamer Magazine
- Thieves' Guild 9: Escape From the Ashwood Mines
- Lands of Mystery (Justice, Inc.) (1985)
- Swordbearer (1985)
- Strike Force (Champions) (1988)

=== Blade of the Avatar series of novels ===
Interior art

- The Sword of Midras
