= Laserburn =

1980 science fiction wargame

Sci-Fi Combat Rules
- Designers: Bryan Ansell
- Illustrators: Tony Yates
- Publication: 1980; 46 years ago
- Genres: Miniature wargaming

Laserburn is a set of wargaming rules written by Bryan Ansell in 1980. Written for use with 15 mm sci-fi figures, but also playable with 25 mm figures, the Laserburn set of rules, published by Tabletop Games, is set in a universe where man has reached the stars and the highest pinnacles of technology and is well on his way back to barbarism. The rules consist of 'Laserburn' and four other supplements, all of which are still available. A range of 15mm metal figures were produced for use with Laserburn and are still available.

There is a small, but active, internet group promoting and expanding on the limited Laserburn background and rules.

Some elements of the Laserburn rules, such as power and dreadnought armour, bolt guns and jet cycles were carried forward and appear in Warhammer 40,000 by Games Workshop whom Ansell worked for in the late 1980s onwards.

== See also ==
- Imperial Commander
