= Enemies II =

Enemies II is a 1982 role-playing game supplement published by Hero Games for Champions.

== Contents ==
Enemies II is a supplement in which statistics and descriptions are provided for supervillains. There are no villains with Ego powers in this supplement.

Enemies II details 33 non-player character supervillains, providing illustrations, game statistics, background information, and operational methods for each one.

== Publication history ==
Enemies II was edited by Bruce Harlick and published by Hero Games in 1982 as 24-page book.

Shannon Appelcline noted that "The Enemies books deserve some additional note because they were Hero's first supplement series. Enemies II (1982) also introduced Champions' first trademark character, the lunatic villain Foxbat, who would later garner even more attention in Champions II when he begged readers to send him experience points and free gadgets."

Many of these villains were later reprinted in Classic Enemies.

== Reception ==
Russell Grant Collins reviewed Enemies and Enemies II for Different Worlds magazine and stated that "One slight problem - these villains, despite what it says in the introduction to Enemies, are not quite accurate to the changes made in the second edition rulebook. The gamemaster will either have to fiddle with the powers to make them fit [...] or he can simply ignore costs as given and increase Villain Bonuses accordingly. Even with this drawback [...] I still recommend these supplements to every Champions gamemaster who does not have unlimited time to create his own foes for the players."
