= The Horrible Secret of Monhegan Island =

Tabletop horror role-playing game supplement

- Cover by Martin Kealey.
- Designers: Gary Pilkington
- Publishers: Grenadier Models
- Publication: 1984; 41 years ago
- Genres: Horror
- Systems: Basic Role-Playing

The Horrible Secret of Monhegan Island is a 1984 role-playing game adventure for Call of Cthulhu, written by Gary Pilkington, cover art by Martin Kealey, and published by Grenadier Models.

== Contents ==
The Horrible Secret of Monhegan Island is a module that includes two adventures, "The Horrible Secret of Monhegan Island" and "The House in the Woods". The first one takes place on the eponymous Monhegan Island, a real place in Maine.

== Reception ==
Stephen Kyle reviewed The Horrible Secret of Monhegan Island for White Dwarf #59, giving it an overall rating of 7 out of 10, and stated that "Bearing in mind the comparatively cheap price of this book, it presents a very useful package, though still not a patch on the outstanding Curse of the Cthonians ... Zero SAN here I come!"

Matthew J. Costello reviewed The Horrible Secret of Monhegan Island in Space Gamer No. 73. Costello commented that "This module is not nearly as complex as many of the Cthulhu scenarios available, yet it has its share of surprises and horror. Think of this one as a chilling 'B' movie from the fifties. While it lacks some polish, it's an interesting debut for Grenadier."

John Dark reviewed The Horrible Secret of Monhegan Island for Different Worlds magazine and stated that "To sum up, Monhegan Island has nothing outstandingly bad with it. But there's nothing outstanding about it at all. Perhaps it is unfair to say that it's just the sort of scenario one would expect a miniatures company to come out with - but it is. If you lack any of the Chaosium or TOME scenario packs, you are advised to fill any need for canned scenarios by purchasing them first. Buy Monhegan Island only to complete your collection or if you have a dire need for a scenario in a hurry."
