= Starfleet Wars =

Starfleet Wars, a space battle game by Superior Models, Inc.

== Gameplay ==
Starfleet Wars, a space battle game featuring five races: Terrans, Entomalians, Avarians, Aquarians and Carnivorans. Starfleet Wars was a dice-rolling simultaneous-action spaceship war game with miniature lead figures.

=== The Opposing Forces ===
There are five different races, each with their own unique fleets of starships.

- Terran Transolar Federation Navy (TTFN) was crewed by the human race
- Entomolian Imperial Fleet (EIF) was made up of insects
- Carnivorian Republic Star Forces (CRSF) were the race of big cats
- Aquarian Alliance Stellar Forces (AASF) came from the seas, such as fish and sharks
- Avarian United Worlds Navy (AUWN) flew in from the air as different types of birds

=== Miniatures ===
Lead figure miniatures of each ship in the five different fleets are available to supplement game play. These were made in 1:9600 scale with some latitude built in for the small fighters that would otherwise be too small to model.

== Publication history ==
It was sold to Gamemasters in 1997, and then was off the market until Monday Knight Productions re-introduced it. Introduced in 1978 and designed by Wayne Smith and Ron Spicer.

Starfleet Wars was purchased by Monday Knight Productions, and re-released under the name Galactic Knights to avoid confusion with the Star Trek franchise.

== Reception ==
Nick Schuessler reviewed Starfleet Wars in The Space Gamer No. 31. Schuessler commented that "If you can afford the beautiful miniatures, you'll need some rules for play. Starfleet Wars can get you started, after you've done a bit of tinkering. Better still would be to wait for Superior to issue a revised edition."

== See also ==
- A Site Devoted Solely to the Universe of Starfleet Wars
- Latest Information on Galactic Knights from Star Ranger's Starship Combat News
- Starfleet Wars from the Wayback Machine
- Belle Haven Pewter Starfleet Wars Collections from Armik's Fine Collectibles
- Galactic Knights Rules, Accessories, and Space Fleets from The Panzer Depot
- Galactic Knights Rules and Miniatures from Noble Knight Games
- Index of Superior Models Starfleet Wars Spaceships
- Miniature figure (gaming)
- Miniature wargaming
- List of board wargames
- 1978 in games
