= Grenadier Models Inc. =

Manufacturer

- Industry: Wargaming; Role-playing game
- Founded: 1975
- Defunct: 1996
- Fate: Closed
- Successor: Mirliton S.G.
- Headquarters: Springfield, Pennsylvania, U.S.
- Key people: Sculptors: Andrew Chernak; Julie Guthrie; Bob Charrette; Sandra Garrity; Nick Lund; Robert Watts; Owners: Andrew Chernak; Ray Rubin; Doug Cowie Managing Director Grenadier Uk Ltd; Roger Higgins part owner Grenadier Models UK Ltd
- Products: Miniature figures

Grenadier Models Inc. of Springfield, Pennsylvania produced lead miniature figures for wargames and role-playing games with fantasy, science fiction and heroic themes between 1975 and 1996. Grenadier Models Inc. is best known for their figures for TSR, Inc.'s Advanced Dungeons & Dragons game, collectible Dragon-of-the-Month and Giants Club figures, and their marketing of paint and miniature sets through traditional retail outlets.

The company began as a basement enterprise, but by 1983 they had grown to a staff of 50 people and had the third highest gross sales in the expanding gaming market. Grenadier's sculptors included John Dennett, Janine Bennett, Julie Guthrie, Nick Lund, Mark Copplestone, Michael Daley, Sandra Garrity, Bob Naismith, William Watt and Ian Symonds. Grenadier closed its doors in 1996, but many of their products remain in production by companies in the UK, Italy and the United States.

== History ==
The company was founded by Andrew Chernak, president and head sculptor, and Ray Rubin, vice president and head artist. Chernak and Rubin had previously partnered in Canterbury Pewter Ltd., a gift-market sculpting business which they had established in 1972. The duo were not new to historical miniatures. Chernak had previously sculpted for Superior Models and Rubin was a co-founder of Squadron-Rubin Miniatures. Grenadier Model's first product was a line of 25mm American Revolution figures released in anticipation of the 1976 United States Bicentennial. The company received its name from their first miniature, a grenadier. In partnership with its European distributor, Grenadier formed Grenadier Models Ltd UK in 1984. By 1991, the British office became the center of the company's design and development.

Grenadier Models published a product catalog in 1978, 1979, 1982 and annually from 1985 to 1994. Separate European catalogs were published in 1985, 1994, and perhaps other years as well. Their products were discussed in the Grenadier Bulletin, a magazine which also contained games, comics, short-stories, and puzzles. The bulletin was published in several series. The first series contained issues #1 through #18 and were released between the fall of 1981 and late 1987. A new series of four editions was issued in late 1991 and early 1992 in the form of a full-color magazine. A third series, somewhat confusingly labeled "volume II," was produced in the summer of 1993, but appears to have been terminated after a single issue. Grenadier's British offices produced a separate "International edition" of the bulletin called the British Grenadier. There were at least thirteen issues and it appears to have been produced around 1988. The British offices also published a bi-monthly newsletter Warrior: The Newsletter for Fantasy Wargamers which supported Grenadier's Fantasy Warrior game. The Warrior included thirteen issues published from December 1992 / January 1993 to April / May 1995.

=== Historical miniatures, 1975-1980 ===
By the end of 1976, Grenadier had produced miniature soldiers from Classical Antiquity and the American Civil War, and American Old West gunfighters. Although they were primarily focused on the well-established market for historical miniatures, their early products included science fiction themed Starsoldiers (product codes #S01-19) and Space Squadrons: Stellardate 2998 (#SS01-SS19) spaceships, 25mm fantasy figures called Wizzards & Warriors (W1-60, WS1-5), a Special Sets line of furniture (#WS01-WS12), and a small selection of 15mm fantasy figures. As the fantasy and science fiction market began to out-pace historical miniatures in 1978, Grenadier released box sets containing select portions of their fantasy, space ships, and gunslinger lines. In 1980 these boxed sets included fantasy game oriented Dungeon Adventure (WW01) and Monsters Sets (WW02), Western Gunfighters (WW03), and Space Squadrons Set (WW04). New figures were crafted for the Gamma World Adventure (WW06), Gamma World Denizens (WW07), Woodland Adventurers (WW08), and Tomb of Spells Sets (WW09). The new lines attracted the attention of TSR, Inc. who produced the Gamma World and Dungeons & Dragons role-playing games and began a short, but lucrative partnership between Grenadier and TSR, Inc..

=== "Your D. & D. Figure Company," 1981-1982 ===
In the fall of 1981 Grenadier Models had begun to refer to itself as "Your D. & D. Figure Company" and began a newsletter The Grenadier Bulletin to advertise its status as the official producer of Advanced Dungeons & Dragons Miniatures, and of miniatures for TSR, Inc.'s Gamma World role-playing game. Its first editor Kim Eastland became an influential author of role-playing games and fiction published by TSR, Inc. The AD&D lines included blister packs of monsters (#101-116), small box sets (#2001-2013), and large box sets (#5001-5004, 5009). A collateral product was Action Art box sets (#8001-8004) which included paints and painting instructions and served to introduce customers to the hobby. The Gamma World role-playing game was supported by a series of blister packs (Gxx), a box sets of adventurers (#5005) and post-apocalyptic monsters (#5006). Grenadier also produced figures (SN1-4) for TSR's Snit's Revenge board game.

In late 1982 Grenadier Models and TSR, Inc. ended their business relationship. The point of contention was Grenadier's plans to produce figures for other game companies. Grenadier later described the separation as "a bold decision... in order to provide players of all fantasy games with a broader range of quality fantasy miniatures". Since many of Chernak's sculptures predated TSR, Inc.'s artwork, Grenadier Models retained the rights to many of their sculptures and re-released choice figures in the Dragon Lords (#2001-2013, 5001-5004), Fantasy Lords (#6001-6005, 101-112), and Action Art (#8003, 8004) lines. There appear to have been continued issues with the reuse of the sculpts which might have resembled images which TSR, Inc. considered trademarked. Parts of some sets (#2010-2012, 8003, 8004) were replaced with new sculpts.

In 1982 and 1983 Grenadier conducted a Wizard's Gold Contest in which they placed gold-plated castings within random boxes of figures. The box also included a certificate for a drawing. The grand prize for 1982 was a one-half ounce of gold for the purchaser of the box set and the store which sold it. The 1983 certificates awarded gift certificates and were placed in 6001 - Dragons of the Emerald Idol and 6002 - Skeleton-Raiders of the Undead box sets. However, collectors have reported gold-plated figures from other contemporaneous sets.

=== "Collect and Paint," 1983-1990 ===
As Grenadier parted ways with TSR they continued to reach out to the burgeoning adventure gaming market. In 1983 they became the official producer of miniatures for Chaosium's Call of Cthulhu (#6501, 6502), and Game Designers' Workshop's Traveller (#1001-1003). In 1983 Grenadier announced an agreement to produce miniatures for FASA's Star Trek role playing game, but the figures were produced by Ral Partha Enterprises, Inc., RAFM in 1985, and Rawcliffe Pewter from 1989 to 1999. At that same time the owners of Grenadier Models spun off a subsidiary called Pinnacle Products with an orientation toward mainstream retail outlets. They produced The Dark Crystal Adventure Collection which included two boxed sets (#9001, 9002, note reuse of product code) containing paints and miniatures of the characters and furniture in the December 1982 movie The Dark Crystal. Other Pinnacle Products merchandise included the Paint and Collect Series consisting of 2201 - Dinosaurs, 2202 - Fantasy Lords, 2203 - Fantasy Monsters, and 2204 - G.I. Assault Team. In early 1983 Grenadier added four Paint and Playsets (#9101-9104) to coincide with Mattel's Masters of the Universe cartoon and 1/285 scale tanks and artillery for Steve Jackson Games' Ogre (#6101, 6110-6115, 6118, 6122) and 1/180 scale vehicles Car Wars Autoduel (#6201-6210) games. In October 1983 Grenadier added a line of Secret Agents (#3001, 3002).

As fantasy and science fiction gaming outpaced traditional wargames and modeling, Grenadier discontinued many of their historical period figures. Lines of 54mm scale figures (#5401-5409) featuring personages like "5401- Jesus of Nazareth," and a 77mm series of figures (#9001-9003, 9006) based on the calendar art of Boris Vallejo. were dropped in 1983.

Between March 1984 and February 1985 Grenadier released twelve monthly installments in the popular Dragon-of-the-Month series. Each box set included a variety of fantasy dragon, a jeweled base, and a portion of a map of the mystical land the dragons inhabited. Those who collected all twelve dragons were eligible to receive an additional dragon figure. Other 1984 introductions included the Masterpiece Editions 5501 - War Mammoth of the Undead Legion, 5501 - Death Dragon, futuristic war machines called Warbots (#4501, 4502), and miniatures for Mayfair Games's Champions (#4001, 4002). Grenadier also released four gaming scenarios: The Horrible Secret of Monhegan Island by Gary Pilkington for Call of Cthulhu, Cloudland by Tony Fiorito for Tunnels and Trolls or Advanced Dungeons & Dragons, Raid on Rajallapor by Gary Pilkington for Blades' Mercenaries, Spies and Private Eyes, and Disappearance on Aramat by Gary Pilkington for Game Designers' Workshop's Traveller.

Grenadier celebrated its 10th anniversary by adding 10,000 commemorative Paladin figures to boxes of 6007 - Fantasy Lords Dungeon Raiders. The "Dragon-of-the-Month" products proved very popular and Grenadier released a second series of dragons in March 1985, a line of large humanoids which they called "The Giant's Club". The first installment was 3501 - Fire Giant, and the "Monster Manuscript" which included dungeon creatures organized in alphabetical order. Also in 1985 Grenadier released the official miniatures for I.C.E.'s Middle-earth in the world of J.R.R. Tolkien's The Lord of the Rings, a line of 15mm soldiers for Game Designers' Workshop's Twilight 2000 skirmish game which takes place in a world where the Cold War was resolved with arms, superheroes for Hero Games' Champions, Pacesetter's Chill, Mayfair Games' D.C. Heroes, and West End Games' Paranoia role-playing games.

Grenadier signed on Julie Guthrie in 1987 to sculpt their first signature line Julie Guthrie's Fantasy Personalities. By 1988 Grenadier became the manufacturer of miniatures for West End Games' role-playing system, Star Wars. This miniatures series was based upon the first three George Lucas films, and included representations of the main characters, Rebel troops, droids, villains, storm troopers, and vehicles. In 1989 Grenadier released the first Shadowrun miniatures for FASA's role-playing game.

=== Grenadier Models U.K., 1991-1994 ===
Grenadier models UK Ltd was created in 1984. Bob Watts approached Roger Higgins of Games of Liverpool, Grenadier's British distributor, to cast Grenadier's products for the European market. Higgins recruited his Import and Wholesale Manager, Doug Cowie and Mal Green to set up and run Grenadier Models UK. Casting equipment was set up above their Birkenhead offices and they learned the trade of casting by trial and error. Public grants through the Welsh Development Agency assisted a move to northern Wales. By 1991 Grenadier had begun selling Nick Lund's Fantasy Warriors: a game of fantasy battles a boxed game which included 102 plastic figures sculpted by Mark Copplestone with later additions by other sculptors. Branches of the company were established in Auckland, New Zealand and Deeside, Clwyd, Wales to support British and Australian customers, remove the costs of international shipping, and connect with Grenadier's European sculptors. The company in Wales provided a chance for Grenadier to tap into the growing market for larger scale (30 mm) miniatures in which UK designers invoked styles from European fantasy and science fiction. Grenadier's office in Wales became the center of the company's product design and British artists Mark Copplestone, Bob Naismith, and Nick Lund became the company's chief sculptors.

The Pennsylvania office provided traditional themes from fantasy and history. Andy Chernak revived his 1978 Western Gunfighters boxed set (#4901) and a line of existing figures entitled Fantasy Classics, Nightmares, and The Best of Julie Guthrie boxed set (#7001). Julie Guthrie introduced the Lords of Light and Decay boxes sets (#8801, 8802), a line of Fantasy Personalities II, and added the Cyberpunk line. Janine Bennett introduced a range of Amazons (#3312) which were suitable for use with Fantasy Warriors.

In 1992 Grenadier Models underwent a period of revitalization. The company's founders Andrew Chernak and Ray Rubin returned to their creative responsibilities. Kim Eastland returned to Grenadier Models from TSR, Inc. The return to the early structure of the company may have been prompted by the loss of their partnerships with game manufacturers. By the beginning of 1993, their licensed figures had dwindled to the point that they only produced Andrew Chernak and Sandra Garrity's sculptures for R. Talsorian Games' Cyberpunk.

The resurgence of the Pennsylvania offices was short-lived, and Nick Lund's Fantasy Warriors (#5000) was the center piece of the 1993 catalog. A similar space-themed game called Future Warriors (#1501-1509, 1701) was released later that same year. Fantasy war gamers were targeted with the Lost Lands boxed sets of 25mm scale miniatures (#3001-3006), Fantasy Warriors artillery pieces and battlefield accessories (#9201-9203, 402-406) and a 15mm Warlords (#1801-1818) line of military units. The fantasy role-playing market was addressed by Julie Guthrie's large signature series (#801-899, 701-724, 7001, 7002, 8101-8145), a Fantasy Legends line (#3101-3128) consisting of existing models and new sculpts by William Watt, Sandra Garrity, and Julie Guthrie. Also in 1993 Grenadier Models released Dragon Lords the Game (#5700-5711) a 6mm scale skirmish game featuring dragon riders, and 25mm plastic space marines called Space Rangers (#87003).

Grenadier Models' figures were initially cast in an alloy of lead and tin, but in 1993 New York legislators nearly passed a public health bill barring the use of lead in toys and games. Despite the additional cost, numerous manufacturers anticipated parental concerns, similar legislation in other states, their own workplace safety, and they began using white metal alloys. Grenadier began converting its lines to a non-lead alloy they called Luminite in the winter of 1992. The use of non-lead alloy marks a clear benchmark for dating old figures. In time, New York Governor Mario Cuomo relented to hobbyists' concerns and exempted miniatures from the state's Public Health Law. However, Grenadier Models did not return to producing in lead.

The product lines for 1994 were a mix of European and American designs. Mark Copplestone and Bob Naismith introduced new sculpts for the Fantasy Warriors game, and Nick Lund and Doug Cowie authored Fantasy Warriors Companion an expansion of the rules. Mike Daley began a series of large scale Master Wizards (#4401, 4402). William Watt added a Battle Giant (#2701) to the Special Edition line, and a signature line of William Watt's Dragons (#2901, 2902).

=== Post Script ===
At Gen Con in August 1996 it was revealed that the molds and master sculpts of Grenadier Models Inc. had been purchased by Stratelibri, their long-time distributor in Milan, Italy. The rights have since passed to Mirliton S.G. who continues to produce many of the figures from Grenadier's last years in business. Some of Grenadier's artists retained the right to their work. In 2001 Mega Miniatures purchased the production rights to 180 of the Julie Guthrie's Grenadier Personalities. Those 180 Grenadier Personalities were sold to Center Stage Miniatures in the fall of 2012. The production of all UK designed and sculpted miniatures are currently licensed to em4miniatures of Rustington, West Sussex, England by the holder of those rights.

Since the sale of Grenadier Model's assets, Andrew Chernak has taken his sculpting to the other extreme and now creates monumental scale bronzes commemorating fallen soldiers. He is also available for lectures on military history and art.

== Reception ==
Ian Knight reviewed the War Mammoth of the Undead Legion, Champions Heroes, and Champions Villains boxed sets for Imagine magazine, and stated that "Considering that imported figures always work out dearer, [the price is] not too bad for the Mammoth, but as you only get a dozen Super-characters per box, they [are] expensive, even by today's standards."

Mike Brunton reviewed Official Bushido 25mm Miniatures and Fantasy Lords for Imagine magazine, and stated that "Overall: Tick, VG, and recommended, for both Bushido and Fantasy Lords."

Steve Jackson reviewed assorted scenery from Grenadier Miniatures for Pyramid #8 (July/August 1994), and stated that "All in all, these are nice, useful pieces, well cast and finished, quite paintable. If you like metal stuff, take a look at these packs. If not, no doubt your dim, tedious life will drag on without them."

== See also ==
- Future Warriors: Kill Zone
