= Miniature model (gaming) =

Small-scale model used in miniature wargaming

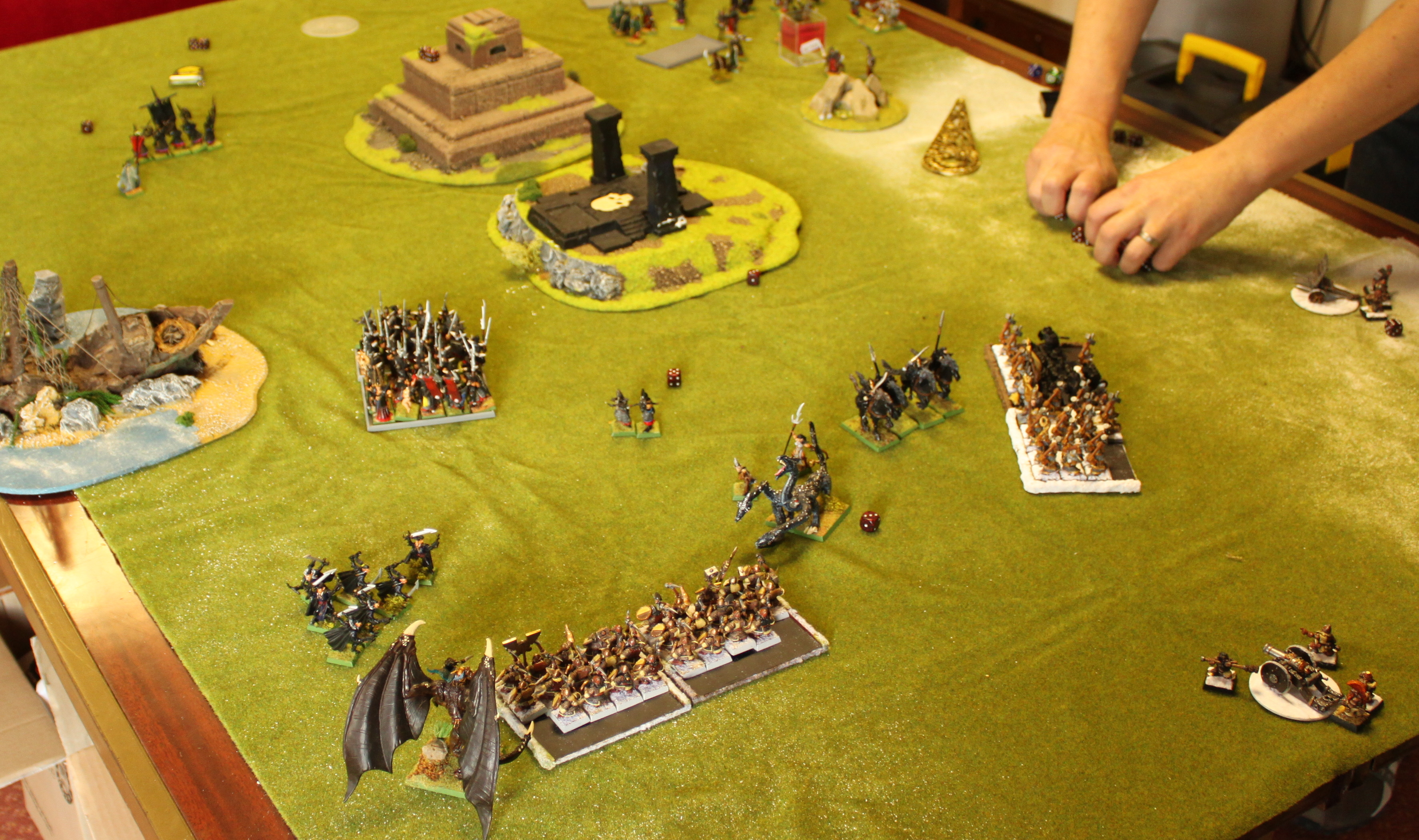
Warhammer miniature model gaming

In miniature wargaming, players enact simulated battles using scale models called miniature models, which can be anywhere from 2 to 54 mm in height, to represent warriors, vehicles, artillery, buildings, and terrain. These models are colloquially referred to as miniatures or minis.

Miniature models are commonly made of metal, plastic, or paper. They are used to augment the visual aspects of a game and track position, facing, and line of sight of characters. Miniatures are typically painted and can be artfully sculpted, making them collectible in their own right. Pre-painted plastic figures, such as Clix miniatures produced by WizKids and unpainted plastic figures for Warhammer by Games Workshop, have become popular. The hobby of painting, collecting, and playing with miniatures originated with toy soldiers, though the latter were generally sold pre-painted.

== Materials ==
Miniature models are derived from toy soldiers which were constructed of a variety of materials, These toy figures came to be mass produced from tin in late 1700s Germany, where they were called Zinnsoldaten (lit. "tin soldiers"). These early figures were low relief models commonly called "flats", and became quite common in western Europe. By the mid 1800s manufactures in several countries were producing three-dimensional miniatures of tin and lead alloys, commonly called white metal. In 1993, the New York legislature introduced a bill outlawing lead in miniatures, citing public health concerns. Many miniature manufacturers, anticipating that other states would also impose bans, began making figures with lead-free alloys, often at increased prices. After months of debate and protests by miniature manufacturers and enthusiasts, New York Governor Mario Cuomo signed a bill which exempted miniatures from the state's public health law. Despite this, most American manufacturers continued to use non-lead alloys.

In the 20th century miniatures would also be manufactured from plastic and composite materials.

Some wargames use "box miniatures", consisting of card stock folded into simple cuboids with representative art printed on the outside. Other games use 2d cardboard miniatures that are either held in a base or folded into a triangular tent.

== Scale heights ==
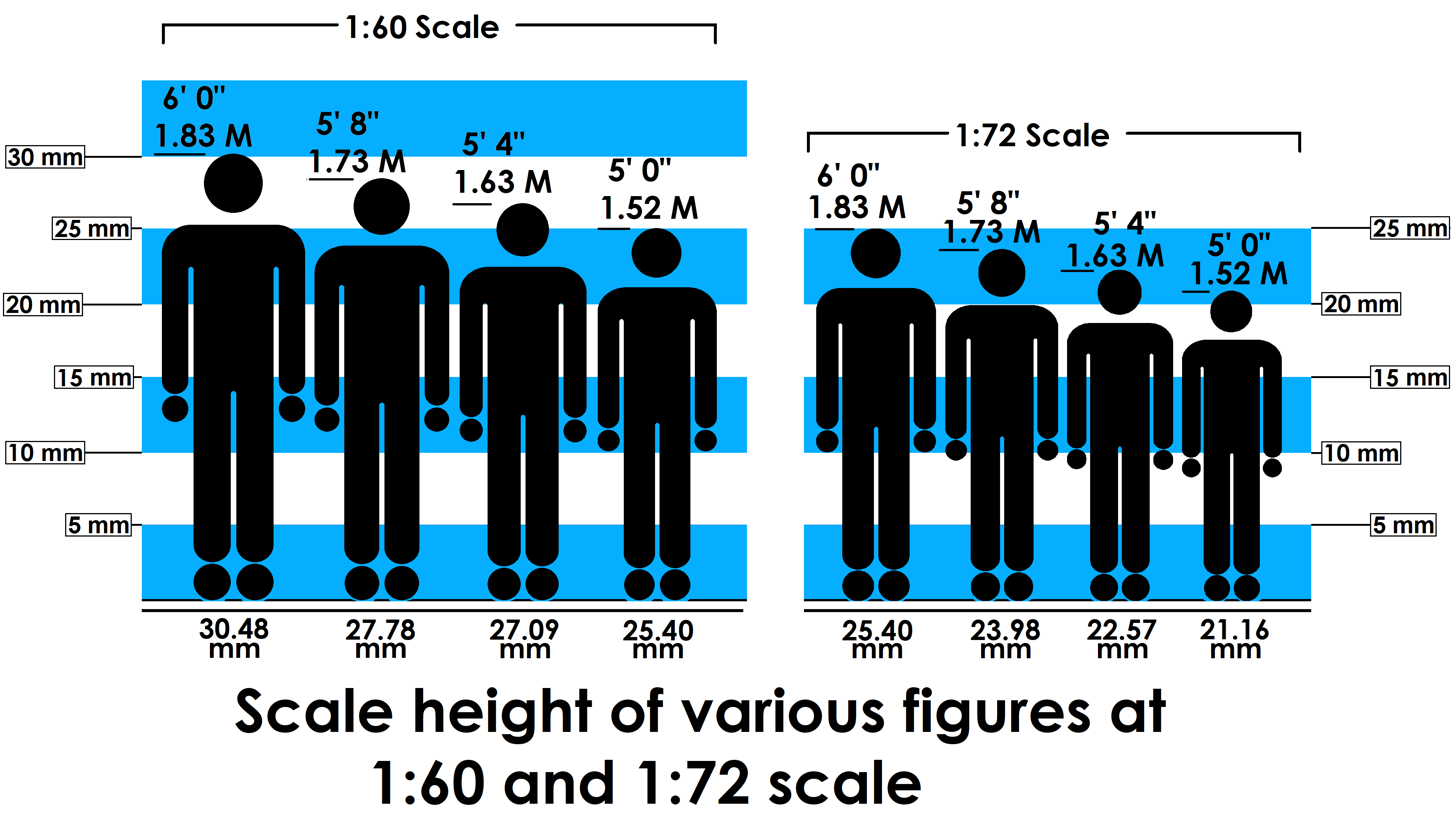
Scale height of figures in 1:60 and 1:72 scale

Historically the size of miniatures was described in absolute scale in various different systems of measurement, most commonly in metric and English units. A 28mm miniature means that the size of the miniature will be 28mm from the feet of the mini to the chosen reference point. The most common miniatures were the 54 mm European miniatures and the 2 1/4" English models which are commonly considered to be 1:32 scale. Early wargames such as H.G Wells Little Wars used these commonly available miniatures. With metrication in the United Kingdom, United States manufacturers began to use the metric system to describe miniatures, as opposed to the previously popular customary units, so that their table-top wargaming models would be compatible. Today, the scale of a figure is often described in millimeters, for example one of the most common scales is 28 mm.

Manufacturers set up a size of the miniature and try to make every miniature similar size or at least have an average with the size they've set up. While a model may be described as 28 mm the actual height of the model may be different. This is because of a number of factors such as manufacturer, model proportion, method of measuring the model, the model's pose, and what sort of character the model is meant to represent. A manufacturer might advertise its figures as 28 mm, but their products may be over 30 mm tall. In 28 mm scale, short characters such as dwarves, hobbits, and goblins might be represented by figures in the 15 to 20 mm range while taller characters like ogres, trolls and dragons would use 30 mm or larger figures. Manufacturer's use of scale is not uniform and can deviate by as much as 30%. Some manufacturers measure figure height from the feet to the eyes rather than the top of the head; therefore, a figure that is 30mm to the top of its head could be considered to be a 28mm miniature. Figures of 15 mm, 20 mm, 25 mm, 28 mm, 30 mm, 32 mm, and 35 mm are the most common for role-playing and table-top games. Smaller figures of 2 mm, 6 mm, 10 mm, 15 mm, and 20 mm are used for mass-combat wargames. Large sizes such as 40 mm and 54 mm were popular with wargamers in the past and are still used by painters and collectors. While the large miniatures have become popular again since the late 20th century, they are not as popular as the smaller sizes.

In many games there is a definite scale specified for the square grid that the game is played upon. One of the most common is 1 inch represents 5 feet. This specifies an exact scale of 1:60. That implies that a 28 mm tall figurine represents a 1.68 m (5 ft 6 in) person – which is a reasonable number for a modern 50th percentile male (See: Human height). Another popular scale is 1/72 or 1 inch equals 6 foot which uses 20 mm, to 25 mm miniatures. It is mostly used for historical gaming in part due to a wide selection of 1/72 scale models. Figures are commonly used with a variety of scales. It is not uncommon for there to be a mismatch between the game scale and miniature size. Chainmail used a scale of 1:360, appropriate to 5 mm miniatures, but was played with 30 mm miniatures, and the conceit that each figure represented 20 men. In the table below, figure height alone (excluding base thickness) is the feature from which approximate scale is calculated.

Figure height	Scale foot	Scale ratio	Comments
2 mm	≈0.333 mm	≈1:914	Useful for gaming in tight spaces or representing large forces. Popular scale for Victorian science fiction (VSF) games.
3 mm	≈0.508 mm	1:600	As with 2 mm figures, useful for gaming in tight spaces or representing large forces. Primarily used for World War II and Modern land and air games. Sometimes referred to as "pico" scale. Popular for ships, especially liners and capital ships. Warship models produced by Airfix.
5.92 mm	≈0.987 mm	≈1:300	The NATO/EU standard scale for sand-table wargames involving micro armor. Closely related to 1:285 scale and generalized as "6 mm" figure scale.
6.2 mm	≈1.033 mm	≈1:285	The US standard for large-scale historical armor battles involving micro armor. Also popular in other genres, such as ancient, fantasy, and sci-fi. Closely related to 1:300 scale.
8.0 - 9.14 mm	≈1.524 mm	≈1:225 – 1:190	Includes the 1:200 scale, common for architectural modelling. Z scale is 1:220 ratio. The standard for old 1970–1980 large-scale display plastic aircraft, a large majority of diecast aircraft, and science fiction plastic kits. Also popular in other genres, such as ancient, fantasy, and sci-fi. One scale inch is equivalent to approximately 1/200 of an inch, 0.005 inches and 25.4 millimetres. One scale foot is equivalent to approximately 12/200 of an inch, 0.06 inches and 1.524 millimetres. One scale yard is equivalent to approximately 1/36 of an inch, 0.18 inches and 4.572 millimetres. Figure scale is 8 mm generally squared off to 1/190 – 1/220 scale.
10 mm	≈1.667 mm - ≈1.9 mm	≈1:182 - 1:160	A newer scale, growing in popularity, especially for World War II and science fiction gaming, but increasingly for historical games as well. 1:160 is equal to N scale railroad trains. Notable manufacturers include Pendraken Miniatures, Newlines, Irregular Miniatures, Magister Militum, Steve Barber, Kallistra, Minifigs UK, Old Glory, and Games Workshop's Warmaster line of miniatures. Often measured as "eye height", giving ~1:160 for 10 mm scale, and figures being 10–12 mm tall overall.
12 mm	2 mm	≈1:152 – 1:144	1:152 is called 2 mm finescale in railway modelling. A newer scale, growing in popularity, closely related to 10 mm. 1:144 scale used for Japanese giant robot models (such as Gunpla) and toys. N scale is a popular model railway scale in this range.
15 mm	≈2.7 mm	≈1:120 –1:100	The most popular scale used for wargames set in the modern era, such as Flames of War or Axis & Allies Miniatures. Also widely used in ancient-era wargaming, such as De Bellis Multitudinis, De Bellis Antiquitatis, and Fields of Glory. Seldom used for RPGs. Ranges roughly from 1:100 scale to 1:122 scale. Equivalent to TT scale in miniature railroading.
18 mm	≈3.2 mm	≈1:100 – 1:90	Heroic scale of 15 mm miniatures, such as the Napoleon At War range.
20 mm	≈3.6 mm	≈1:90 – 1:72	1:87 is roughly HO scale. Highly popular for World War II wargaming, 1/76 is roughly the same scale as 4 mm scale or OO model railways). Seldom used for RPGs. Airfix made a considerable range of figures in this scale: historically they were labelled on the box as "HO & OO scale" but are now described as 1/76 or 1/72 scale.
25 mm	≈4.4 mm	≈1:72 – 1:69	Used to be the most popular size for pre-1970s wargaming figures and roleplaying figures. While original mini figures matched 1:72 models there developed wide upwards variation in figure height and these are the most common ones to be used for wargaming.
28 mm	≈5 mm	≈1:64 – 1:62	Popular for wargaming figures and RPGs. Heroic scale of 25 mm miniatures. Used by Games Workshop in the initial editions of its games.
30 mm	≈5.33 mm	≈1:60 – 1:58	Heroic scale of 28 mm miniatures introduced by Games Workshop for Warhammer 40,000 figures. Close to S scale model railroads. Due to Scale creep, modern 30 mm figures may be similar to 1:64 models (S scale), but appear larger due to bulky sculpting and thick bases. At an exact scale of 1:60 (30.48 mm), it matches common battlemap grids where 1 inch represents 5 feet.
32 mm	≈5.7 mm	≈1:54	Heroic scale of 30 mm miniatures. Currently, the most common size of miniature figures. Genuine 32 mm unique to Mithril Miniatures. Most common size for modern wargaming minis, although some miniatures may be up to 35 mm.
35 mm	≈6.2 mm	≈1:52 – 1:48	Heroic scale of 32 mm miniatures. 1:50 scale is a popular size for diecast models from European manufacturers. 1:48 is commonly known as quarter scale or American O scale.
40 mm	≈7 mm	≈1:45 – 1:43	Older figures from the 1960s and tend to be thinner / shorter than new metal ones. Close to O scale model railroads.
54 mm	9.6 mm	1:35 –1:32	Traditional "toy soldier" scale. Popular for display (non-wargaming) and collectible figures. Historically, these were considered to be 1:32 or 3/8" to the foot models similar to Gauge 1 toy and model trains. Plastic dollar-store army men are often sold at this scale. Most new plastic 54 mm figures are 1/32.
75 mm	12.7 mm	1:24	Largest common scale used for gaming. 1:24 is a common scale for cars and airplanes. Compatible with G scale model railways

Scales smaller still are used when the game involves large vehicles (such as starships or battleships). For instance Axis & Allies Naval Miniatures: War at Sea uses 1:1800 scale, and scales down to 1:6000 are seen. There is no equivalent "mm" number for these scales as individual figures would be nearly microscopic and are not used as such in the games.

=== Heroic scale ===
A further complication is differing interpretations of body proportions. Many gaming figures are unrealistically bulky for their height, with oversized feet, heads, hands, wrists, and weapons. Making these parts oversized allows for more details to be present in the miniatures. Some of these exaggerations began as concessions to the limitations of primitive mold-making and sculpting techniques, but they have evolved into stylistic conventions. Figurines with these exaggerated features are often referred to as heroic scale.

=== Scale creep ===
There is a noted tendency in miniature figure manufacture where over time for bigger and bigger figures to be produced. Larger models were easier to produce correctly, especially in the 20th century; bigger details come out better, and larger surfaces are easier to paint. When a company sees that people are still buying the larger models, that's an incentive for them to continue making larger ones.

== Miniature figure scale ==
This is a relative scale that compares the size of the model to the size of a real life object. This ratio will show how many times the model is smaller than the original size. The meaning of 15 mm (for example) is therefore dependent on a defined reference height. Thus 15 mm in the context of a dwarven world where the reference humanoid is 60 inches (152 cm) tall, is not equivalent to 15 mm in the context an NBA model where the reference humanoid is 2 meters tall. Both models can be described as 15 mm, but the real world sizes depend on the size of the reference humanoid. In practice, the reference humanoid is generally assumed to be the idea of the average height of the human male, within a 6-inch (15 cm) interval between 5.5 and 6 feet (168 and 183 cm), unless otherwise indicated by the designer. Average human height is heavily dependent on the population measured within a geographical region and historical era.

The following chart provides a numerical relationship between model scale and multiple figurine scales based on the platonic idea of the height of a human being (humanoid).

Miniature figure scale chart
						12"	60"	66"	72"
1:N	1 model inch					Humanoid			
Scale	Meters	Feet	Inches	cm	mm	mm	mm	mm	mm
1	0.0254	0.0833	1	2.54	25.4	304.80	1524	1676	1829
12	0.3048	1	12	30.48	304.8	25.40	127.00	139.70	152.40
24	0.6096	2	24	60.96	609.6	12.70	63.50	69.85	76.20
36	0.9144	3	36	91.44	914.4	8.47	42.33	46.57	50.80
48	1.2192	4	48	121.92	1219.2	6.35	31.75	34.93	38.10
60	1.524	5	60	152.4	1524	5.08	25.40	27.94	30.48
72	1.8288	6	72	182.88	1828.8	4.23	21.17	23.28	25.40
84	2.1336	7	84	213.36	2133.6	3.63	18.14	19.96	21.77
96	2.4384	8	96	243.84	2438.4	3.18	15.88	17.46	19.05
108	2.7432	9	108	274.32	2743.2	2.82	14.11	15.52	16.93
120	3.048	10	120	304.8	3048	2.54	12.70	13.97	15.24
144	3.6576	12	144	365.76	3657.6	2.12	10.58	11.64	12.70
180	4.572	15	180	457.2	4572	1.69	8.47	9.31	10.16
240	6.096	20	240	609.6	6096	1.27	6.35	6.99	7.62
300	7.62	25	300	762	7620	1.02	5.08	5.59	6.10
360	9.144	30	360	914.4	9144	0.85	4.23	4.66	5.08
480	12.192	40	480	1219.2	12192	0.64	3.18	3.49	3.81
600	15.24	50	600	1524	15240	0.51	2.54	2.79	3.05
720	18.288	60	720	1828.8	18288	0.42	2.12	2.33	2.54
840	21.336	70	840	2133.6	21336	0.36	1.81	2.00	2.18
900	22.86	75	900	2286	22860	0.34	1.69	1.86	2.03
960	24.384	80	960	2438.4	24384	0.32	1.59	1.75	1.91
1080	27.432	90	1080	2743.2	27432	0.28	1.41	1.55	1.69
1200	30.48	100	1200	3048	30480	0.25	1.27	1.40	1.52
1800	45.72	150	1800	4572	45720	0.17	0.85	0.93	1.02
2400	60.96	200	2400	6096	60960	0.13	0.64	0.70	0.76

== Painting ==
Many role-playing gamers and wargamers paint their miniatures to differentiate characters or units on a gaming surface (terrain, battle mat, or unadorned table top).

Fantasy, role-playing, miniatures, and wargaming conventions sometimes feature miniature painting competitions, such as Games Workshop's Golden Demon contest. There are also many painting competitions on the internet.

== Manufacture ==
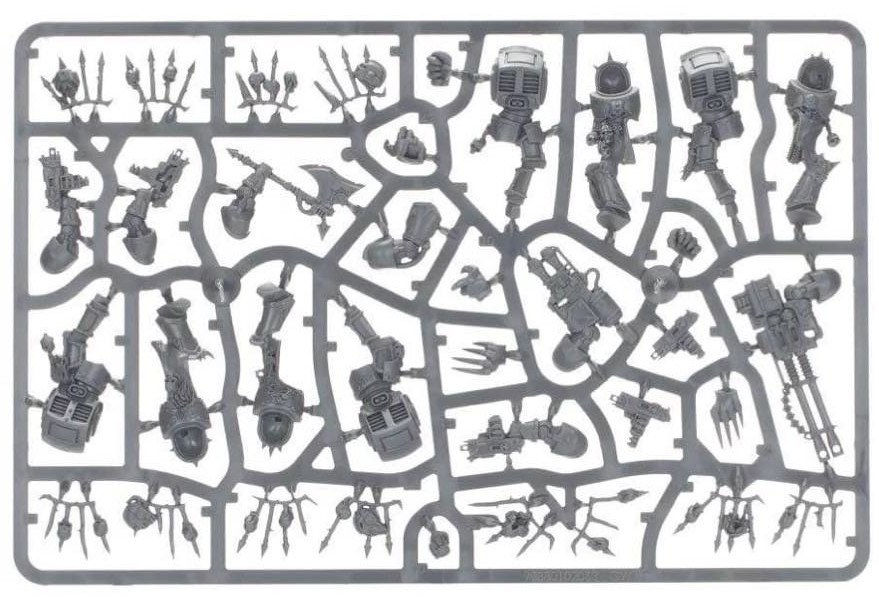
Plastic miniature components on a sprue

There are two basic methods of manufacturing figures: centrifugal/gravity casting and plastic injection casting.

Most metal and resin figures are made through spin casting. Larger resin models, like buildings and vehicles, are sometimes gravity cast, which is a slower process. To gravity cast, a sculptor develops a master figure, which is then used to create rubber master and production moulds. The production moulds are used to cast the final commercial figures.

Polyethylene and polystyrene figures are made by injection moulding. A machine heats plastic and injects it under high pressure into a steel mould. This is an expensive process; it is only cost effective when manufacturing large amounts of figures, since the quantity renders the cost per cast minimal. Many miniatures companies do not produce their figures themselves but leave the manufacturing to specialized casting companies or miniatures companies that have casting facilities.

== Sculpting ==
Most miniatures are hand sculpted using two-component epoxy putties in the same size as the final figure. The components of the putty are mixed together to create a sculpting compound that hardens over 48 hours. Some common brands include Polymerics Kneadatite blue\yellow (also known as "green stuff" and "Duro" in Europe), Milliput, A&B, Magic sculpt, and Kraftmark's ProCreate.

Until recently, sculptors avoided polymer clays as they cannot withstand the traditional mould-making process. Modern techniques using RTV silicone and softer-quality rubbers have made it possible to use weaker materials, so that polymer clay masters have become more common. Fimo clay is popular, though due to the individual properties of certain colours, only a limited selection of colours is used.

Masters for plastic miniatures are often made in a larger scale, often three times the required size. The master is measured with a probe linked to a pantograph that reduces the measurements to the correct size and drives the cutter that makes the moulds.

A more recent development is the use of digital 3D models made by computer artists. These digital models create a physical model for mould-making using rapid prototyping techniques. Alternatively, they can be used directly to drive a computer numerical control machine that cuts the steel mould. They can also simply skip moulding steps and directly produce miniatures from 3D models.

== Miniatures in Dungeons & Dragons ==
Originally, Dungeons & Dragons was an evolution of the Chainmail medieval miniatures game, with the distinction that each player controlled a single figure and had a wider variety of actions available. The original D&D boxed set bore the subtitle, "Rules for Fantastic Miniature Wargames Campaigns Playable with Paper and Pencil and Miniature Figures". However, Dungeons & Dragons did not require miniatures, referring to them as "only aesthetically pleasing". Advanced Dungeons & Dragons likewise included a relatively short section describing miniature use, in conjunction with the official AD&D miniatures being produced at the time. As the game developed, miniatures became more of an optional add-on. The AD&D 2nd Edition accessory Player's Option: Combat & Tactics introduced a more elaborate grid-based combat system that emphasized the use of miniatures; a streamlined version of some of these concepts appeared in D&D 3rd edition. Although not strictly necessary, the 4th edition of the game assumes the use of miniatures, and many game mechanics refer explicitly to the combat grid. In addition to reducing ambiguity about the size and position of characters, this allows the game to specify rules for reach, threatened areas, and movement rates. The 5th edition de-emphasized these mechanics, and returned the use of miniatures to mostly optional.

== 2D miniatures ==
Some games feature miniatures printed on cardboard or cardstock, and some companies have published such miniatures to be used in place of miniature models.

- Steve Jackson Games published the Cardboard Heroes line, and included cardstock miniatures in Steve Jackson's Man to Man, and then in the GURPS Basic Set and supplements such as GURPS Autoduel.
- Zargonians was another early line of cardboard miniatures.
- The Dungeons & Dragons Basic game included cardstock miniatures in supplements and adventures such as The Kidnapping of Princess Arelina, The Revenge of Rusak, The Veiled Society, and The Gem and the Staff.
- Marvel Super Heroes by TSR included cardstock miniatures, and was supplemented by Adventure Fold-Up Figures and more in Pit of the Viper.
- Other games that featured such 2D miniatures include Star Patrol, Ringworld, Dragonroar, Judge Dredd: The Role-Playing Game, TWERPS, and Space: 1889.

== See also ==
- Meeple
- Miniature conversion
- Model figure
- List of gaming miniatures companies
