= 1981 in games =

This page lists board and card games, wargames, miniatures games, and tabletop role-playing games published in 1981. For video games, see 1981 in video gaming.

== Games released or invented in 1981 ==
- A House Divided
- Aftermath! (role-playing game)
- Attack of the Mutants!
- Axis & Allies (Nova Games version)
- Baboon Ball
- The Barbarians
- Bushido (role-playing game)
- Call of Cthulhu (role-playing game)
- Champions (role-playing game)
- Conquistador (2nd edition)
- Cry Havoc
- Dimension Demons
- Down with the King
- A Fistful of Turkeys
- The Fury of the Norsemen
- The Generic Gangster Chase Game
- Hitler's War
- The Lords of Underearth
- Midgard (role-playing game)
- Shuttlewars
- Storm Over Arnhem
- Stormbringer (role-playing game)
- They've Invaded Pleasantville
- Trailblazer
- Transylvania
- The Trojan War
- Upwords
- Voyage of the B.S.M. Pandora

== Game awards given in 1981 ==
- Spiel des Jahres: Focus

== Significant game-related events in 1981 ==
- Amarillo Design Bureau was founded.
