= Outpost Gamma =

1981 science fiction board game

- Cover art by Frank Cirocco
- Designers: Howard Barasch
- Illustrators: Frank Cirocco; David Helber
- Publishers: Heritage Models
- Publication: 1981
- Genres: Science fiction
- Players: 2
- Playing time: 120 minutes
- Age range: 12 years and up

Outpost Gamma is a science fiction board game published in 1981 by Dwarfstar Games, an imprint of Heritage Models, in which embattled Imperial Legionnaires defend themselves against indigenous forces.

== Setting ==
The game is set on the colony world of Irda, where colonists (Twargs) have been using the indigenous Irdans to mine valuable gems for them. The Irdans have revolted against the Twargs, resulting in Imperial Legionnaires arriving to put down the revolt. However, the Irdans are much more powerful than expected, and are aided by massive storms that sweep the surface of the planet, affecting combat.

== Description ==
Outpost Gamma is a 2-player board game in which one player controls ten Legionnaires and the other player controls a horde of Irdans. The map features twelve different types of terrain, all of which affect movement and combat.

=== Gameplay ===
Each turn follows the sequence:

1. Storm generation: Players determine if a new storm is generated, and if so, the location, size and direction of the storm.
2. Place Legionnaire stun grenades
3. Irdan attack
4. Legionnaire attack

=== Combat ===
To determine the result of an attack, the defender's strength is subtracted from the attacker's strength, a die is rolled and modified for terrain, and then the Combat Results Table is consulted for the effect against the defender.

=== Scenarios ===
Two scenarios are offered:

1. "The Last Outpost:" The Legionnaire player, using ten Legionnaires, wins by holding at least three mesa-top hexes for 15 turns or by eliminating all Irdan units. Any other result is an Irdan victory.
2. "Evacuation": Seven Legionnaires must protect six Twargs as they move from one side of the map to the other. The Legionnaire player wins if at least three Twargs are successfully evacuated. Any less is an Irdan victory.

== Publication history ==
In the late 1970s, Metagaming Concepts enjoyed a measure of success with their cheap popular MicroGames, small science fiction oriented board wargames packaged in either a plastic bag or a small clamshell box. By 1981, other companies had begun to produce similar microgames, including Task Force Games, Simulations Publications Inc., TSR, Mayfair Games and Steve Jackson Games. At the 1981 Origins Game Fair, Dwarfstar Games, an imprint of Heritage Models, joined the microgame market by releasing four games, one of which was Outpost Gamma, designed by Howard Barasch, with cover art by Frank Cirocco. Unlike other microgames of the time that used unmounted paper maps and sheets of paper counters, Outpost Gamma featured a mounted map and die-cut cardboard counters with artwork by David Helber .

== Reception ==
In Issue 44 of The Space Gamer, Bruce F. Webster called this game "a refreshing return to nuts-and-bolts tactics. When I first opened the game, I was a little put off by there being only two scenarios. However, the tactical richness of the game is such that those two scenarios can keep you going for a long time." Webster also liked the components, especially the map, which he called a "gorgeous, full-color piece of artwork that looks like terrain and is a far cry from the rather dull and even crude maps found in many microgames (e.g. Olympica and even Ogre). The counters are equally colorful and have the same quality (though not as detailed) artwork." The only issues Webster had were that some rules seemed "fuzzy", the board didn't lay flat, and "the physical scaie/time elapsed per game turn/ stacking limits combination doesn't seem to be very well coordinated." Despite these issues, Webster concluded, "I recommend Outpost Gamma without reservations. Like Ogre and GEV, you will get far more than your money's worth."

In Issue 12 of Ares Magazine, Steve List questioned the combat procedures and terrain benefits. He also found both scenarios to be unbalanced in favour of the Irdans, retitling the scenarios "Custer Had It Easy." List liked the components, writing, "The best thing I can say about OPG is that the map, painted by David Helber, is excellent." List concluded on a negative note, saying, "As a game, the mechanics are not appropriate to the scale of action and the scenarios are neither balanced nor imaginative. Despite its billing as a 'game of man to man combat,' it is not and its system is not one which admits (or encourages) developing home-brew scenarios as does Star Soldier. Outpost Gamma is not worth a visit.

In the March 1983 issue of Asimov's Science Fiction, Dana Lombardy noted, "The elite troops expect an easy assignment, but the native Irdans have been arming and organizing themselves with the equipment obtained from raids on the miners. It will be a tough struggle."

In the October 1988 issue of Vindicator, Duke Ritenhouse liked the quality of the components, and found the clarity of the rules very good. However, he found the game very complex for its size, with "a bewildering variety of terrains and terrain-related rules." Ritenhouse concluded by giving the game a rating of 4 out of 5, saying, "Graphically, it's hard to beat any of the eight Dwarfstar/Heritage microgames of the early 80s — they were ahead of their time then, and they're still gorgeous to look at now. Outpost Gamma is no exception; it is a superior achievement graphically. It can also be quite fun to play ... But the steep initial learning curve precludes a perfect rating."

In a retrospective review of Outpost Gamma in Black Gate, Sean McLachlan said "While the game balance was somewhat poor, we enjoyed playing. If we play this one again, though, I'll have to come up with a more balanced scenario."
