= Ice War =

Board wargame published in 1978

Ice War is a board wargame published by Metagaming Concepts in 1978 that hypothesizes a Eurasian attack against American oilfields in Alaska.

== Gameplay ==
Ice War is a two-player game of arctic warfare involving a raid by the Eurasian Socialist Alliance on Alaskan oil fields at Prudhoe Bay. One player takes the part of the ESA attackers, while the other plays the American defenders.

Players have an ability to purchase 30 points of units, and can choose from outposts, recon sleds, hovercraft, tanks, infantry, orbital platforms, recon satellites and missiles. There are five modes of transportation, all of which have differing abilities to traverse the four types of terrain (tundra, mud, ice and water). Terrain can be converted from one type to another as a result of combat. At a certain point in the game, the American player can bring on reinforcements, but only in the single town on the map, and not at all if the town is destroyed by the ESA.

The game comes with a 24-page rule book, an 8" x 14" two-colour paper map, and 135 cardboard counters.

== Publication history ==
In 1977, Metagaming Concepts pioneered the microgame, a small and relatively simple solitaire or two-person wargame packaged in a ziplock bag. Over the next five years, the company produced almost two dozen games in their MicroGame line. Ice War was the 9th game in the series, designed by Keith Gross and published in 1978. This was Gross's first published game; he would go on to design Invasion of the Air-eaters, The Air-Eaters Strike Back!, and Hitler’s War.

== Reception ==
In the June 1979 edition of Dragon (Issue 26), Tony Watson found that Ice War "plays fast and clean... Play is simple but challenging, especially if the players take the time to examine the problems and possibilities that face them." Watson recommended the game, saying, "Ice War is fast, fun and challenging. It offers interesting tactical play about a situation that is not all that implausible."

Don Turnbull reviewed Ice War for White Dwarf #15, giving it an overall rating of 5 out of 10, and stated that "Excellent though the idea is, I can't help feeling that this subject would be better handled in a larger, more expansive (and expensive) format."

In the inaugural edition of Ares Magazine, David Ritchie gave Ice Wars a 7 out of 9, saying "There is heavy emphasis on limited intelligence and the effect of various weapons on the ice pack off the bay. Playable in 45 minutes or less. Simple, but fun."

In the March 1980 edition of Dragon (Issue 35), Roberto Camino compared Ice War to SPI's War in the Ice, a similar game of arctic combat, although set in Antarctica. Camino preferred Ice Wars, saying that although the quality of the game materials in War in the Ice was superior to Ice War, the simple rules of Ice War were preferable to the very complex rules for War in the Ice. Camino concluded that "Dollar for dollar — War in the Ice is $10, Ice War is $3 — Ice War is the better buy."

In Issue 27 of Simulacrum, Brian Train noted, "The main challenge in this game is anticipating where the Godless Commies will strike and how to stop them. The first part of the game centres around satellite searches of the ice to the north of the oilfield, and blowing holes in the ice with nuclear weapons!"

In a retrospective review in Issue 35 of Warning Order, Matt Irsik called the game "Definitely a product of the Cold War era." Irsik warned that the game was a bit more involved than 21st century games, saying, "At the time this was the most complex of the microgames, although compared to many other games in the 70s and 80s it was standard fare." He concluded, "Although it seems dated today, at the time it was a fun game that saw the Russian force trying to remain hidden for as long as possible, followed by a series of sharp engagements that determined the winner."

== Other reviews and commentary ==
- Magia i Miecz (Issue 1 - 1993) (Polish)
- Galileo
