= Rommel's Panzers =

Military themed boardgame

Rommel's Panzers is a board wargame published by Metagaming Concepts in 1980 that simulates combat in North Africa in 1941.

== Description ==
Rommel's Panzers is a two-player game featuring tactical combat in 1941–42 in the North African desert between the Afrika Korps of Erwin Rommel and British forces. It was the first historical game by Metagaming Concepts, which to that point had specialized in fantasy and science fiction games, and was the first of five microgames in MetaGaming's MicroHistory series of Microgames. The game rules include ten scenarios.

=== Components ===
The microgame game box contains:

- 14" x 12.25" paper hex grid map
- 20-page rulebook
- 126 thin counters
- small 6-sided die
- plastic storage bag

The counters represent:

- British
  - Grant M3
  - Stuart M3
  - Crusader Mk. II
  - Matilda Mk. II
  - Bofors 40mm light anti-aircraft gun, used in an anti-tank role
  - Two-pounder anti-tank gun
  - Six-pounder anti-tank gun
  - trucks
- German
  - Panzer Mark II light tank
  - Panzer Mark IIIE tank
  - Panzer Mark IIIJ special tank
  - Panzer Mark IVD tank
  - 28/20 Pak anti-tank gun
  - 5 cm Pak 38 anti-tank gun
  - 8.8 cm Flak 18/36/37/41 anti-aircraft gun used in an anti-tank role
  - trucks

=== Gameplay ===
Units are set up according to the scenario. Turns are divided into:

1. movement
2. fire from any tanks or guns that did not move
3. defensive fire
4. fire from tanks that moved
5. second movement phase

== Publication history ==
Metagaming Concepts entered the games industry in 1974 with the science fiction game Stellar Conquest, and followed this with other science fiction and fantasy microgames such as Ogre, G.E.V., Melee, and Wizard. In 1980, Metagaming published their first historical simulation, Rommel's Panzers, a microgame designed by Roger Damon. Metagaming followed this with the four other games in the MicroHistory series: Ram Speed: Naval Warfare in the Bronze Age, Stalin's Tanks: Armor Battles on the Russian Front, The Fury of the Norsemen, and Fire When Ready.

== Reception ==
In The Space Gamer No. 30., Nick Schuessler thought the game a bit simplistic, but concluded, "Rommel's Panzers plays it safe with tried and true systems, no infantry, and no terrain. [...] If you don't own any other WWII tactical games, Rommel's Panzers provides a good introduction to this level of play at a reasonable price."

In Issue 28 of Phoenix, Paul King found the components a bit primitive, with misprinted coordinates on the map, and misprinted counters. However, he found the rules easy to assimilate, especially if the scenarios were played in order, since new rules were introduced in successive scenarios. He also thought that "As a tank simulation, even if you know little of tank warfare, you become aware of what is right and wrong. A mad rush by all available tanks will achieve little even in the face of a few emplaced guns." He concluded on a positive note, saying, "the game adheres to Metagaming's principles — quick and easy to play. As a new venture for the firm this is a good game, covering a theatre which has had little exposure at the tactical level."

== Other reviews ==
- Fire & Movement #60
- Panzerfaust Magazine #54
- Strategy & Tactics #40
