= WorldKiller: The Game of Planetary Assault =

1980 science fiction board wargame

The inaugural issue of Ares, which contained WorldKiller

WorldKiller: The Game of Planetary Assault is a science fiction board wargame published by Simulations Publications Inc. (SPI) in 1980 that simulates humans in the far future defending a planet against an alien attack.

== Description ==
WorldKiller is a two-player board wargame in which one player controls aliens who seek to destroy the planet Greendream, and the other player controls the humans defending Greendream.

The map is divided into an eight by twelve grid. Each square represents a three-dimensional stack of seven cubes, and placing a counter on various markings in the square indicate on which of the seven levels a counter is located.

=== Gameplay ===
The alien player either passes or performs a single act with one ship:

- Jump to another part of the board
- Attack
- Stretch a longer Jump produced by delaying the Jump for a number of turns. Only alien ships can Stretch.
- Pop: Move and attack in a single turn. This is the only time a ship can do two actions at once, but the ship takes two points of damage as a result.
- Repair

Once the alien player concludes the ship's action, that ship counter is inverted and cannot be used again that turn. Play passes to the Human player, who also either passes or performs a single action with one ship. Play passes back and forth between the two players until both players pass, bringing the current Game Turn to an end. All ships that were inverted are turned face-up, and the next Game Turn begins.

There is no set number of turns — the game continues until the aliens either destroy the planet, or become so weakened that they cannot destroy the planet.

The game includes several optional rules, including reinforcements, missile cruisers, a new type of human ship, and variable unit strengths.

=== Victory conditions ===
The aliens win by destroying the planet. The humans win by preventing this.

== Publication history ==
Through the 1970s, SPI had specialized in military history wargames. But the 1977 publication of Metagaming Concepts's science fiction MicroGame titled OGRE proved enormously popular, and other publishers such as Task Force Games and SPI started to develop their own microgames. SPI went a step further, creating a new science-fiction magazine titled Ares, and the microgame WorldKiller appeared as a free-pullout game in the first issue. (This mirrored SPI's popular military wargame magazine Strategy & Tactics, which featured a free game in every issue.)

The game was designed by Redmond A. Simonsen, and Simonsen also created the graphic design. WorldKiller was also released as a boxed set, but it was denigrated by critics, and did not crack SPI's Top Ten Bestselling Games list.

== Reception ==
In Issue 28 of The Space Gamer, Jerry Epperson was not impressed with the game, writing "I fear Ares is going to hit the same rut as Strategy & Tactics has been in: that of printing a half baked game in every issue. Ares would come highly recommended if not for the dog of a game." Epperson found WorldKiller's map colors "very tiring to look at." Epperson also had problems with the rules, which he found to be "extremely sketchy with a simplistic game rationale, like any cheap s-f game on the market. Play is very simple; this could (with a little modification) be a good introductory game for beginners." Epperson concluded, "Ares/WorldKiller is a disappointment. It’s uneven. Expect nothing but the best in serious science fiction writing here, and nothing but the worst from the games."

In Fantastic, game designer Greg Costikyan was equally as unimpressed, writing, "One would have thought that SPl would seek to make a good impression by producing a high quality game in the first issue [of Ares]. On the contrary, WorldKiller is a dog [...] The game is simple and uninteresting, with no complications introduced to hold one’s interest."
