= Chitin: I =

Board game

1st edition cover (1977), with artwork by Jennell Jaquays (Note: Credited as Paul Jaquays.)

Chitin: I is a science fiction microgame published by Metagaming Concepts in 1977 in which bands of intelligent insects vie for resources.

== Description ==
Chitin: I is a two-player board wargame in which both players control cities of Hymenoptera, intelligent insects, who are battling for enough food to survive.

=== Components ===
The game's plastic bag contains:

- 9" x 14" paper hex grid map
- 112 die-cut counters
- 17-page rulebook

=== Gameplay ===
Each insect army is divided into three castes: warriors, leaders, and workers, each of which have various capabilities. Players must use a combination of castes effectively in order to maximize their combat capabilities and food collection. Food chits on the board are what both sides covet, but the dead bodies of both sides can also be collected for food. Victory is dependent on how much food is collected.

There are six scenarios included in the game starting with a simple introductory scenario designed to teach the rules. Each subsequent scenario then grows in complexity and length. The game can either be played with Basic rules, or with the Advanced rules, which add two new types of insects. Turns are a simple "I go, You go" system, where one player moves and fights, then the other player moves and fights.

Combat is typical for wargames of the time: the ratio of attacker to defender strength is determined, the corresponding column of a Combat Results Table (CRT) consulted, and a die rolled to determine the exact result: elimination of a unit, forced retreat, or disruption, which interferes with a unit's combat and movement abilities for the next turn.

== Publication history ==
In 1977, Metagaming Concepts pioneered a new type of small, fast and cheap wargame packaged in a ziplock bag. Ogre was the first of this MicroGame series, and Chitin: I was the second, designed by Howard Thompson, with artwork by Jennell Jaquays. The game sold well enough that a second edition, with new artwork by Jaquays, was published the following year. The game was still popular enough four years after its publication that Dragon, owned by rival game company TSR, published a two-page article on variant castes for Chitin: I.

== Reception ==
David James Ritchie reviewed Chitin: I in The Space Gamer No. 13, commenting that "For those who like their carnage in cardboard, Chitin: I is definitely an attractive brew." Ritchie also reviewed the game in Ares Magazine #1, rating it a 5 out of 9 and with the comments "Fairly short and simple. Lots of fun. Those with a taste for the bizarre will appreciate their units' ability to eat friendly casualties."

In the October 1980 issue of Fantastic, game designer Greg Costikyan wrote, "Though the concept was rather interesting, Chitin was something of a disappointment after OGRE. Not a bad game, but it didn't live up to expectations."

In Issue 27 of Simulacrum, Brian Train noted, "This is a good example of a 'minimalist' yet open ended design with a lot of replay value, making it typical of the early Metagaming microgames."

In Issue 35 of Warning Order, Matt Irsik commented, "The gameplay was pretty good and this game is still well thought of after all these years."

In a retrospective review of Chitin: I in Black Gate, John O'Neill said "Like Ogre before it, Chitin fired the imagination. Losing a war had pretty dire consequences for your insect colony. My most vivid memories of the game were in the hours after the board was put away, wondering what would happen to the losing side as summer ended and the hive retreated to face starvation and a long winter... would they survive to next summer? Or would a series of setbacks wipe out an entire culture? For a simple little game, Chitin packed an emotional punch."
