= Olympica =

1978 Science fiction board wargame

The U.N. Raid on Mars, 2206 A.D.
- Cover art by Jennell Jaquays (Note: Credited as Paul Jaquays.)
- Designers: Lynn Willis
- Publishers: Metagaming Concepts
- Publication: 1978; 47 years ago
- Genres: Science fiction board wargame

Olympica, subtitled "The U.N. Raid on Mars, 2206 A.D.", is a science fiction microgame published by Metagaming Concepts in 1978.

== Description ==
Olympica is a two-player combat-oriented game set on Mars in 2206. Martian colonists are threatened by a thought-control machine hidden within Nix Olympica called the "Web Mind Generator" that forces anyone under its influence to serve the "Web". One player takes the role of UN forces that will try to destroy the Web generator situated in the Martian crater Olympica, while the other player controls the machine's defenses. The U.N. forces have light and heavy infantry, laser tanks, a laser drill and rocket-powered lifters. The defender uses light but fast infantry, redoubts and a tunnel system.

=== Components ===
The ziplock bag holds:

- a 8" x 14" paper hex grid map
- a cardstock sheet of 75 playing pieces
- a 24-page rulebook

=== Setup ===
The defender sets out counters for defense, including the exact placement of the Web generator. A number of "dummy" counters are included to keep the exact location of units unknown until they are encountered.

=== Gameplay ===
The UN player makes an initial "drop" of units. Advantage of movement is given to the defensive player, who pays no cost to move through difficult terrain. Combat can either be ranged or close assault, which may raise clouds of dust, temporarily incapacitating affected units. Although the U.N. forces have more firepower, close assaults favor the defender, and the defender has an opportunity to bring on reinforcements at fixed intervals, while the U.N. forces cannot replace losses.

The game offers several scenarios in which the initial setup of each side varies.

== Publication history ==
In 1977, Metagaming Concepts pioneered a new type of small, fast and cheap solitaire or two-player wargame packaged in a ziplock bag, and produced nearly two dozen game in the series over the next five years. The seventh to be published was Olympica, a game designed by Lynn Willis, with artwork by Jennell Jaquays.

== Reception ==
In the inaugural issue of Ares Magazine, David Ritchie noted that the game "borrows quite shamelessly from Heinlein's Starship Troopers." Despite enjoying the short games, Ritchie was ambivalent about Olympica, giving it a below-average rating of 5 out of 9, commenting that the game "is fairly interesting and fun. Playable in an hour or so. Moderately simple."

In the November 1978 edition of Dragon, Tony Watson generally liked the game, although he didn't think it was as unique as some of Metagaming's previous MicroGame offerings such as Ogre or WarpWar. He admired the artwork on the counters, but found the map's orange and black artwork "a not particularly pleasant color scheme". Although he believed the Web generator, being a mind control device, could have played a more prominent and active role in the combat, he recommended the game, saying, "The system is workable and easy and the game is certainly tense as the UN strive to seek out and capture the generator."

In Issue 24 of Phoenix, K.P. Grimsley liked the game, calling it "a very entertaining, simple and quick game." Grimsley concluded, "A must for any gamers collection, if only for when a game finishes early."

In Issue 27 of Simulacrum, Brian Train noted that this was the very first MicroGame he purchased and he recalled "[I] had a load of fun with it, even playing solitaire!"

In a retrospective review in Issue 35 of Warning Order, Matt Irsik commented "This was a pretty clever man to man system with pretty good gameplay. The orange map took some getting used to, but it was an original idea and again, for $2.95 you at least got your money's worth."
