= Ram Speed =

Cover art by Ben Ostrander

Ram Speed, subtitled "Naval Warfare in the Bronze Age", is a two-player microgame published by Metagaming Concepts in 1980 that simulates naval combat between galleys in the Mediterranean during the Bronze Age when the preferred method of attack was ramming a ship.

== Description ==
Ram Speed does not simulate a specific battle. Instead, each player builds a fleet of penteconters, biremes, triremes and quinqueremes using a point-buy system. The players then set up their fleets on the board to begin the game.

=== Components ===
The small flat game box includes:

- 20-page rule booklet
- thin cardstock card of 52 counters (to be cut apart)
- 12" x 14" paper hex grid map
- small 6-sided die

=== Gameplay ===
The sequence of play each turn is:

1. Roll for initiative
2. First player ungrapples (if necessary), moves, and rams (if possible)
3. Second player ungrapples (if necessary), moves, and rams (if possible)
4. Simultaneous missile fire
5. Grappling followed by boarding

Galleys can move forward at full speed or backwards at half speed, and can achieve double or triple speed for short periods of time, but there are penalties for exhaustion.

== Publication history ==
Metagaming Concepts pioneered the concept of the microgame, a small game packaged in a ziplock bag or small flat box, in 1977 with the release of Ogre. They subsequently published more microgames with science fiction or fantasy themes. In 1980, Metagaming turned to historical themes, publishing five microgames as part of the MicroHistory series. The first was Rommel's Panzers. The second was Ram Speed, designed by Colin Keizer, with artwork by Ben Ostrander.

== Reception ==
In Issue 34 of The Space Gamer, Ronald Mark Pehr thought the game was "tremendous fun", calling it "the cerebral equivalent of amusement park bumper cars." He also liked that "Rules are easy to learn, set-up doesn't take forever, and record keeping isn't onerous." His only complaints were that counters were larger than the hexes, leading to misunderstandings about ship position; and a few rules were ambiguous. Nevertheless, he concluded "The faults don't mar the game. Ramspeed is less complicated than most other games, but as enjoyable as any. Whether you play it as a fast [microgame], or as part of a historical or fantasy campaign, it should be well worth the time you devote to it."

In Issue 31 of Phoenix, John Lambshead was not impressed with the game, calling it historically inaccurate and unoriginal. He concluded, "I really cannot recommend this game."

In Issue 27 of Simulacrum, Brian Train noted, "this is not a technically or historically accurate portrayal of ancient naval warfare. The movement rules, with so few restrictions on speed changes (guess the galley slaves are all from the Land of Evinrude) and the sequential movement, are almost too simple." Train also objected to the non-historical concept of placing catapults on the ships. Train concluded that the game was "a simple, cheap, short, and painless study of a particular situation. Its abstract and concise nature makes it hard for period 'feel' to come through, but that can be an advantage as well."

In a retrospective review in Issue 35 of Warning Order, Matt Irsik commented that the game was "certainly playable, well thought out, and probably should have received more attention at the time."

== Other reviews and commentary ==
- Richard Berg's Review of Games #8
- Fire & Movement #29
