= Annihilator & One World =

Two 1979 board games in one box

Annihilator & OneWorld are two board wargames released in one package by Metagaming Concepts in 1979 as the 14th addition to its MicroGame line.

== Description ==
OneWorld and Annihilator are separate two-player microgames that differ greatly in theme.

OneWorld, is a light-hearted fantasy game in which the players take the role of opposing gods Chez and Borg. The gods send their children Fog, Blade and Stone to attack the rival god, using a form of diceless combat similar to "rock paper scissors." The game ends when one of the gods is destroyed.

Annihilator is a more traditional science fiction wargame featuring a giant planet-killing machine similar to the one in the Star Trek episode The Doomsday Machine (1967). One player sends a small military unit into the machine to seek out and destroy its two computer brains, while the other player controls the machine's robots and other defenses.

=== Components ===
The ziplock bag contains:

- 8.5" x 14" OneWorld map (brown on green)
- 12" x 14" Annihilator map (black on blue)
- 24-page rulebook
- 133 cardstock counters

The second edition added an errata sheet for Annihilator.

== Publication history ==
In 1977, Metagaming Concepts pioneered a new type of small, fast and cheap wargame packaged in a ziplock bag titled Ogre. It proved popular, and Metagaming produced more MicroGames. Annihilator & OneWorld was the 14th game in the series, designed by Robert Phillips and published by Metagaming in 1979. Some rules for Annihilator around the use of demolition charges and victory conditions were problematic, and Metagaming issues an identically packaged second edition in 1980 that contained an errata sheet.

== Reception ==
In the inaugural issue of Ares Magazine, David Ritchie was not impressed by OneWorld, saying the game "takes the childhood game of 'rock breaks scissors' and attempts to dignify it by using that system (thinly disguised) to power a game." Ritchie concluded, "This one doesn't even qualify as cotton candy." He thought Annihilator held "a bit more interest", and despite the asymmetrical forces, "The result is a nicely balanced game which almost succeeds in overcoming the flimsiness of its premise." Overall, Ritchie gave the two games an extremely poor rating of only 2 out of 9.

In the May-June 1980 edition of The Space Gamer (Issue No. 28), Denis Loubet was similarly unimpressed by either game. "OneWorld seems to take itself too seriously, and I don't know whether to believe the introduction or not. The counter mix is sort of unbalanced; the fog counters are of little worth, while the blades are the main attacking force." He had similar thoughts about Annihilator, calling it "just too small a game; there's not enough there. If there were more and different counters and a more complex and varied map, it might have the popularity of Ogre, but as it stands it's too small.".

In the August 1980 edition of Dragon (Issue 40), Glenn Williams confessed that he bought Annihilator & OneWorld simply for Annihilator. However, he was very disappointed in the game, finding a number of issues with the scale of the game, its balance, and its weapons. He concluded that although "both the rationale and the mechanics of the game were poorly developed", the game could be adapted for other uses, and was therefore "worth the price." He concluded "Play the game a few times to learn it, then start making your own versions."

In the October 1980 issue of Fantastic, game designer Greg Costikyan called Annihilator "simplistic and uninteresting; a 'publisher's note' says it is designed mostly for the novice player, but I don't think Metagaming should have bothered." Of OneWorld, Costikyan wrote that the game "has received mostly negative reviews; true, it is only mildly interesting to play, but its system and premise are more than a little amusing." Costikyan concluded, "Amusing — but not worth $2.95. What’s gotten into Metagaming, anyway?"

In Issue 35 of Warning Order, Matt Irsik was ambivalent about Annihilator, saying, "The map, counters, and theme were a bit bland, but the game is playable." He was more impressed with OneWorld: "A fascinating fantasy game with a rock, paper, scissors type of combat system! The back story and topic were interesting to say the least."
