= Helltank Destroyer =

Board game

Helltank Destroyer is a science fiction board wargame published by Metagaming Concepts in 1982 as part of its MicroGame line that features combat between supertanks and other futuristic weapons systems. The game is a sequel to 1981's Helltank, which is itself based on Ogre.

== Gameplay ==
Helltank Destroyer is a two-player wargame featuring forces armed with powerful weapons, including powerful Helltanks and even more powerful Helltank Destroyers. Players choose a scenario, and then choose the weapons systems to use.

Players can also design their own weapons systems according to a set of rules.

== Publication history ==
Metagaming's very first entry in their MicroGame line was Ogre, a science fiction wargame between a large semi-intelligent tank and more numerous but less powerful conventional weapons. The game was designed by Steve Jackson, and when Jackson left Metagaming to form Steve Jackson Games, he took with him the rights to Ogre. In an effort to replace this loss, Phil Kosnett created Helltank, which was published by Metagaming in 1981. Kosnett then created the sequel Helltank Destroyer the following year, which was published as the 22nd and last MicroGame, packaged like previous games in the series in a ziplock bag with cover art by Norman Royal. Shortly after its publication, Metagaming went out of business.

== Reception ==
In Issue 60 of The Space Gamer, Steve List complained that none of the scenarios carried a predefined list of weaponry, saying, "Players are entitled to at least one playtested scenario with a specified set of forces; the option of selecting one's own is nice, but it should not be the only way to fly. For this reason, I caution potential buyers: If you don't like to roll your own, don't buy this game."

Nexus #2 commented that the game was "A mundane treatment of present-day armoured warfare, with a couple of 21st Century terms loosely tacked on... every game I played, including advanced games with Helltanks was virtually decided by the third turn. Maybe the designer is trying to tell us that he feels that future armour battles will be extremely lethal. That may well be the case; but it sure makes for a boring game."

In Issue 27 of Simulacrum, Brian Train noted, "There are some interesting points in the design. [...] That being said, the Combat Results Table is very bloody and the small map does not give much scope for maneuver.."

In Issue 35 of Warning Order, Matt Irsik commented, "Not a bad game, but once again the comparisons to Ogre and GEV proved that it was good, but not great and that was the end of the series."

== Other reviews and commentary ==
- Ares #13
- The Grenadier #17
