= War in the Ice =

Board game

War in the Ice, subtitled "The Battle for the Seventh Continent, 1991-92", is a near-future science fiction board wargame published by Simulations Publications, Inc. (SPI) in 1978 that simulates a war over resources in Antarctica.

== Gameplay ==
War in the Ice is a two-player combat-oriented game in which the US and USSR begin a war over ownership of Antarctica in 1991. There are optional rules for a three-player game — the third player takes the role of the "South American Union" — as well as a science fiction option in which the U.S.-U.S.S.R. war awakes a subterranean alien civilization.

Several scenarios are given in the game. Players use land and air forces, as well as electronic warfare, to try to reach the victory conditions described in the scenario. Because of the harsh weather conditions in Antarctica, developing and holding bases becomes paramount to victory. There are also optional rules for magnetic disruption, naval blockade, sensor-activated mines, aerial sensor emplacement, and political influence.

The game comes with a rulebook that includes eleven pages of designer's notes, a game board and 400 counters.

== Publication history ==
In the late 1970s, Phil Kosnett was a teenager attending high school who also worked as a part-time game designer at SPI. He had already created Yugoslavia (1977), Acre (1978), and Objective Moscow (1978) when he was given the assignment to design War in the Ice. It was released in 1979 with graphic design by Redmond A. Simonsen and immediately rose to #6 on SPI's Top Ten Bestselling Games List, where it stayed for four months.

== Reception ==
In the March 1980 edition of Dragon (Issue 35), Roberto Camino was pleased by the quality of the map and playing pieces, but did not like the fact that constantly used charts and tables are printed in the rulebook rather than being printed on a separate sheet. He also thought a status sheet for land forces would have made play a lot easier because land force counters are usually arrayed on the map face-down, and have to be turned over constantly in order to know which one was where. Camino found the rules overly complex, mainly due to the rules about air units and satellites. In comparing War in the Ice to Ice War, a micro-game published at the same time by Metagaming, he found that although the quality of the game materials in War in the Ice were much superior to Ice War, the rules for War in the Ice were far more complex than Ice War. Camino concluded that "Dollar for dollar — War in the Ice is $10, Ice War is $3 — Ice War is the better buy."

In the first issue of Ares Magazine, Eric Goldberg was not enthused about War in the Ice, rating it only a 4 out of 9 because "there is not enough play value in the game to make this potentially fascinating situation come alive. The various scenarios plod along until the players seek a more amusing diversion (such as throwing snowballs). Even the background is poorly constructed: a lost civilization is found beneath the Antarctic surface, beginning another war for its technology. It's an amusing idea, but doesn't belong in this package."
