= Rivets (board game) =

1977 board game

Artwork by Brian Wilson, 1977

Rivets is a post-apocalyptic board wargame published by Metagaming Concepts in 1977.

== Description ==
Rivets is a two-player game featuring combat between robotic tanks, taking place after the human race has been annihilated. The game posits that gangs of semi-intelligent robots roam the landscape, fighting with other gangs over sources of spare parts.

=== Components ===
The microgame, packaged in a ziplock bag, comes with

- 17-page rulebook with cover art
- 8" x 14" two-color map
- 188 thin cardstock counters

=== Setup ===
The two players agree on a point value for their gangs, and secretly "buy" various robot models up to the point limit.

=== Gameplay ===
The players program their robots' movements in secret and reveal their moves simultaneously. The winner is the player whose robot gang survives the combat.

== Publication history ==
Metagaming Concepts pioneered the concept of the minimalist ziplock-packaged microgame in 1974. Three years later, the MicroGame line published Rivets, a microgame designed by Robert Taylor with artwork by Brian Wilson.

== Reception ==
In the inaugural edition of Ares Magazine (March 1980), David Ritchie was not impressed by this game, finding it boring and predictable, saying, "If it all sounds slightly silly ... it is. This one is simple, and should be played by players with the average intelligence of an electric can opener. An average game lasts three-quarters of an hour." He concluded by giving Rivets a very poor rating of 3 out of 9.

In the October 1980 issue of Fantastic, game designer Greg Costikyan called the game "one of my personal favorites ... It was a cute game."

In Issue 36 of Phoenix (March–April 1982), S.N. Goodwin found too many acronyms in the rules, using as an example, "If a BCPC attacks a TB (PTA RBs) and rolls an AR on the CRT, do you treat it as NE?" Goodwin also found the thin counters and the small map "the worst features of the game [...] hopelessly small for sustained e.g. Club, play." However, he thought the actual game was challenging and enjoyable, calling it "quite exceptional value in terms of its sustained interest value." He concluded "Even if you don't like [science fiction], for £2 why not give this one a try?"

In Issue 27 of Simulacrum, Brian Train noted, "There is enough variation in the types of robots, combined with the ability to re-program them during the game, to keep trying out new strategies and force mixes for some time."

In Issue 35 of Warning Order, Matt Irsik commented, "Definitely one of the more quirkier sci-fi games you'll ever see.[...] A lot of fun."

== Reviews ==
- Moves #37, p17
