= Transylvania (board game) =

Board game

Cover with title misspelled "Translyvania"

Transylvania is a microgame published by Mayfair Games in 1981 that simulates a battle between Transylvanian villagers and the evil forces that surround them.

== Gameplay ==
Transylvania is a two-player board wargame in which one player controls the villagers, which include peasants, knights, priests and men-at-arms; and the other player controls the vampires and their minions (wolves, skeletons, rats, and bats).

The map is divided into the village, the castle, the surrounding forest, and six areas designated A to F.

Each turn is divided into four phases:

- Build and Score: Each player builds more units if they have the points. New villagers start in the village, new Evil units start in either the castle or the forest. The Good player scores 8 victory points for occupying the village, the Evil player scores 6 points for occupying the castle. Either player can score a point for occupying a lettered area.
- Morning: Villagers can move one space each, or two if they move along the road. Wolves and rats also move one space each. Vampires, skeletons and bats cannot move.
- Afternoon: Villagers, wolves and rats can move again. Vampires, skeletons and bats cannot move.
- Night: Skeletons and bats can move two spaces. Vampires can move unlimited spaces along dotted lines, and must return to the castle at the end of the night phase. Villagers, wolves and rats cannot move.

When combat occurs, the attacker rolls two or three dice, depending on the unit, and must roll a number greater than the defense rating of the unit they are attacking.

=== Victory conditions ===
The game ends immediately if the Evil player has units in the village at the end of a night phase, or the forces of Good have a unit inside the castle at the end of a morning or afternoon phase. The player who has accumulated the most points at this juncture is the winner.

== Publication history ==
In 1977, Metagaming Concepts published Ogre and pioneered the microgame, a small and easy-to-learn wargame, often with a fantasy or science fiction theme, packaged in a ziplock bag or thin plastic case. Several game companies responded with their own lines of microgrames, chief among them the "Fantasy Capsule" and "Space Capsule" microgames of Simulations Publications Inc. and the "Pocket Games" of Task Force Games. Mayfair also marketed a number of microgames, the fifth one being Transylvania in 1981. It was a very cheaply made game, with cardstock cut-apart counters and a single page of rules, and was notable for the misspelled title "Translyvania" on the cover.

== Reception ==
In The Space Gamer No. 46, William A. Barton commented on the unprofessional components, saying, "Transylvania was obviously an early effort on Mayfair's part; the other titles in the line are much superior. Still, Transylvania might suffice if you want a very simple game about vampires."

In Issue 27 of Simulacrum, Brian Train also noted the cheap components, saying, "It had a price of $3.00 when other games in the [same] series sold for $5.00, and the components and nature of the design show it." Train concluded that this was a game to avoid, calling it "a weak and dull design with nothing innovative in it."
