= Holy War (board game) =

Board and counter wargame (1979). Metagaming Concepts. Designed by Lynn Willis

- Designers: Lynn Willis
- Publishers: Metagaming Concepts
- Publication: 1979; 47 years ago
- Genres: Science fiction board wargame

Holy War is a science fiction board wargame published by Metagaming Concepts in 1979 in which two groups battle each other inside a pocket universe.

== Description ==
An immense space-dwelling creature was able to seal a cosmic anomaly inside its nebulous form, creating a pocket universe in which intelligent life inadvertently developed. The intelligent life gradually divided into the Sunthrowers, who do not believe their universe is a god and want to destroy it to gain their freedom, and the Holy Band, who believe that the Sunthrowers are heretics who must be stopped.

Holy War is a two-player game in which one player controls the Sunthrowers, and the other controls the Holy Band.

Combat is done in three dimensions, and movement uses a dual horizontal and vertical system previously used in Godsfire.

== Publication history ==
Starting in 1977, Metagaming Concepts pioneered the concept of the microgame, a small pocket-sized wargame packaged in a ziplock bag, and produced almost two dozen games in its MicroGame line. The 13th in this line was Holy War, was a game designed by Lynn Willis as a full-sized board game, but then reduced down to a microgame and published in 1979.

== Reception ==
In the inaugural issue of Ares Magazine, game designer Eric Goldberg questioned the clarity of the rules, saying, "The rules to Holy War are extremely difficult to decipher, and, as the game is interpreted by the designer, only one side may win." Goldberg concluded by giving the game a very poor rating of only 2 out of 9.

In the 1980 book The Complete Book of Wargames, game designer Jon Freeman noted that "It apparently began life as a full-sized game, and the transition to the microgame format was not entirely successful. This isn't a bad game, but there's too much of it. If you drop about one third of the rules, the result is reasonably clean and simple game less dependent on luck than the original." Freeman concluded by giving this game an Overall Evaluation of "Fair to Good."

In the October 1980 issue of Fantastic, game designer Greg Costikyan wrote that the game "evidences sloppy development work, despite a solid design by Lynn Willis ... The problem is that the rules are rather obscurely written and difficult to learn completely and quickly; and that changes made by Metagaming from Willis' original design completely unbalance the game." Costikyan concluded, "Holy War must by considered an interesting failure."

In Issue 27 of Simulacrum, Brian Train noted, "the combination of many unit types and the weird board can render play rather confusing. Having really only one scenario means that replay value is not very large".

In Issue 35 of Warning Order, Matt Irsik commented, "The game, while complex for its size, did a good job of portraying 3D strategic movement. With a vast array of bizarre units and options, this was once again a game that gave you a lot for your money. Not as popular as many of the other games in the series in that it was difficult to play solitaire." Irsik concluded, "The game had a novel concept, interesting forces, and the unique movement/combat gave it a great sci-fi feel."
