= Sticks & Stones (board game) =

1978 board game

Artwork by Pat Hidy

Sticks & Stones is a board wargame published by Metagaming Concepts in 1978 that is set in the Neolithic Age.

== Description ==
Sticks & Stones is a two-player microgame in which rival Stone Age tribes vie with each other. It was the first board game featuring a Neolithic setting.

=== Components ===
The ziplock bag contains:

- 8.5" x 14" paper hex grid map
- 24-page rule booklet
- a sheet of 136 uncut cardstock counters

=== Scenarios ===
The game includes five scenarios:

- Raid on unfortified village
- Raid on a fortified village
- War between two fortified villages
- Territorial ritual battle
- Mastodon hunt (solitaire scenario)

=== Gameplay ===
Each player buys warriors and weapons using a pool of points. Turns are played in standard "I go, You go" format — one player moves and fights, then the other player moves and fights. Combat is resolved with a Combat Result Table and a die roll.

Each warrior counter has two damage points. The first time a unit is hit, the counter is turned over to indicate it is damaged. The next time it is hit, the counter is removed from the board.

Victory conditions vary from scenario to scenario, and may involve the capture of villagers and goods rather than the outright elimination of the opposing warriors.

== Publication history ==
In 1977, Metagaming Concepts pioneered a new type of small, fast and cheap wargame packaged in a ziplock bag titled Ogre. It proved popular, and Metagaming produced more games in what they called the MicroGame series. Sticks & Stones was the 11th game in the series, designed by David Ray, with interior and cover art by Pat Hidy.

After Metagaming Concepts went out of business, Hobby Japan acquired the rights to the game and in 1987 published a Japanese-language edition both as a boxed set and as a pullout game in Tactics magazine.

== Reception ==
In Issue 38 of the British wargaming magazine Perfidious Albion, Doug Ryder noted that "The rules are easily learnt and should provide no problems even to beginners." Ryder concluded, "The success of this game lies in the things that can be done with it, you don't have to rely upon the scenarios provided or just use the rules given, you can design your own."

In Issue 35 of Warning Order, Matt Irsik was not sure the game was "sci-fi" enough for him, but ended up liking the game because "the game system works." He concluded, "On the surface you wouldn’t think that this would be a great game as it deals with stone age man to man combat, but it is actually pretty good."

In Issue 27 of Simulacrum, Brian Train commented, "This is a good stand-alone game on the topic, in fact the only one I found that dealt exclusively with Neolithic warfare. I had quite a bit of fun with it when I first got mine." Train also noted, "There are some interesting chrome rules for capture of dependents, goats and goods, roaming goats, poisoned weapons, and fire."

David Lent and Len Krol of Centurion's Review did not like the thin cardstock counters, which they felt were too small and too thin to handle easily. They also noted that the counters were not double-sided, so that damaged counters showed a blank white side, making it hard to remember which counters were which. They also thought the map's hex grid was too small, and that set-up took too long — often longer than the actual game. On the plus side, they found the rules simple, well-written and easy to learn, and games were fast and enjoyable. Lent and Krol concluded, "If you see a copy, buy it."

== Reviews ==
- Games & Puzzles #73

== Other recognition ==
A copy of Sticks & Stones is held in the collection of the Strong National Museum of Play, a gift of Darwin Bromley and Peter Bromley.
