= Black Hole (board game) =

Micro wargame published in 1978

Black Hole is a science fiction board wargame published by Metagaming Concepts in 1978 as part of its MicroGame line.

== Gameplay ==
Black Hole is a two-player space combat game. The setting is in an asteroid shaped like a doughnut that was created by aliens and has a black hole in the middle. Each player represents a major corporate power trying to take possession of the asteroid, its alien artifacts, and the black hole.

Each side has counters representing heavy armor units armed with either rockets or lasers. The map shows both the inside and the outside of the asteroid, and has varying rates of movement from sector to sector as units to move to inner or outer edges to account for the lack of a three-dimensional model. Rockets that are launched immediately achieve orbit, and spiral around the torus until encountering another unit. Units that come too close to the black hole are randomly transferred to another location.

== Publication history ==
Metagaming Concepts pioneered the concept of the microgame, a small game packaged in a ziplock bag or small flat box, in 1977 with the release of Ogre. They subsequently published more microgames with science fiction or fantasy themes. The tenth in this series was Black Hole, designed by Robert Taylor and published by Metagaming Concepts in 1978.

== Reception ==
In the October 1979 edition of Dragon (Issue 30), David Cook was impressed by the two-dimensional map of the asteroid that managed to approximate three-dimensional space. He was also impressed by the movement rules that tried to account for gravity around the asteroid. However, he was puzzled as to why only heavy armor units were included in the game, and was disappointed that the black hole has only one minor effect on the game. He concluded, "Black Hole is a fun game. It plays very fast and forces players to plan at least one move ahead. Movement of units becomes an important consideration. Objectives are simple."

Don Turnbull reviewed Black Hole for White Dwarf #15, giving it an overall rating of 9 out of 10, and stated that "Black Hole is a unique little game - fascinating and appealing, which lives up to all the characteristics of the micro-game. It deserves to be very popular indeed."

In the October 1980 issue of Fantastic, game designer Greg Costikyan called it "a game with one (and only one) interesting feature; the game-map depicts a toroidal-shaped asteroid (like a donut) in a quite realistic manner, something I wouldn't have thought possible ... Other than this, the game is a pretty standard land-combat game, with a few interesting twists."

In the inaugural issue of Ares Magazine, David Ritchie was also disappointed that "the black hole doesn't have much effect on play, except to randomly radiate units trying to jump across the hole from one side of the doughnut to the other. However, it does make a hell of a good title." Ritchie rated the game an average of 6 out of 9, saying, "Playable in an hour or so. Moderately simple."

In the 1980 book The Complete Book of Wargames, game designer Jon Freeman wrote, "Other than the toroidal surface, this is just another wargame. The science is poor.... Nonetheless, the artificial limitations and the somewhat warped science combine with the unique map to make an enjoyable, non-serious game, at least until the novelty wears off." Freeman concluded by giving the game an Overall Evaluation of "Good, for a while."

The Space Gamer commented "While it is an above average game with a definite science fiction flavour, it is flawed."

In Issue 35 of Warning Order, Matt Irsik commented, "OK, so the science in this game is a bit wacky, but that shouldn't deter anyone from having a great time with this game. [...] Great fun despite the science behind the game."
