= Artifact (board game) =

Board wargame published in 1980

Cover art by Doug Potter

Artifact is a science fiction microgame published by Metagaming Concepts in 1980 as part of its MicroGame line that simulates combat on the moon over a recovered alien artifact.

== Description ==
Artifact is a two-player tactical wargame where one player controls American astronauts on the Moon and the other player controls either Soviet astronauts or aliens.

The game posits that an alien artifact called a "dingus" has been discovered, and two factions are fighting for ownership. With a small map, 84 counters, and a 20-page rule book, the game has been characterized as "simple".

The game has four scenarios. In three of them, the Americans battle with the Soviets for control of the dingus. In the fourth, the Americans battle an alien force that has inadvertently been called by the dingus.

=== Gameplay ===
The game system uses an alternating "I Go, You Go" system, where one player moves and fires, followed by the other player, or as critic Richard Berg put it, "Find your target, see if you can hit it, see if you can destroy it."

== Publication history ==
In 1977, Metagaming Concepts pioneered a new type of small, fast, and cheap wargame packaged in a ziplock bag titled Ogre. It proved popular, and Metagaming produced more games in what they called the MicroGame series. Artifact was the 16th game in the series, designed by Glenn Williams, with interior and cover art by Doug Potter. The game was packaged in a ziplock bag, like other games in the MicroGame line, but was the first in the line to also be sold in a slim plastic box.

== Reception ==
Game designer Richard Berg thought the scenarios were "nice", but found the graphics (purple on white and white on purple) to be "drab and garish at the same time, if that's possible — and it is."

In Issue 31 of The Space Gamer, Robert Marrinan called the counters "an awful shade of purple and white" and the game map was "not very impressive, but typical of what Metagaming has been offering for the past few years." He found "The scenarios on the whole were well balanced and somewhat enjoyable to play." However, referring to the lunar low-gravity setting, Marrinan felt "The simple movement/combat system was stretched too far. The game could have used a more complex system to properly simulate combat on the Earth's satellite." Marrinan concluded by giving the game a grade of "C-", saying, "I felt as if I were playing a good game only partially developed. Metagaming needs to spend some more time on the chrome (counters and map artwork), as well as the basic playing system."

In Issue 35 of Warning Order, Matt Irsik commented, "Not much good to say about this game other than the system works, but it's a lot of effort for not much gain." Irsik concluded, "It's not great, but not so bad that you shouldn't try it at least once."
