= Helltank =

Board game

Helltank is a science fiction board wargame published by Metagaming Concepts in 1981 as part of its MicroGame line. The game simulates combat in the future between a supertank and more conventional forces.

== Gameplay ==
Helltank is a 2-player game featuring asymmetric forces: one player has a large and advanced supertank, while the other player has more numerous but weaker forces such as infantry and artillery. The map depicts a city, wooded hills, a canal, and a highway, and the players select a scenario and a time period.

== Publication history ==
Metagaming's very first entry in their MicroGame line was Ogre, a science fiction wargame between a large semi-intelligent tank and more numerous but less powerful foes that was designed by Steve Jackson. When Jackson left Metagaming to form Steve Jackson Games, he took with him the rights to Ogre. In an effort to replace this loss, Phil Kosnett designed Helltank, which was published by Metagaming in 1981 as the 19th MicroGame, packaged like previous games in the series in a ziplock bag. Metagaming published the sequel Helltank Destroyer the following year, shortly before the company went out of business.

== Reception ==
W. G. Armintrout reviewed Helltank in The Space Gamer No. 49. Armintrout commented that "Helltank got shortchanged somewhere in production. I do like the game, but I can recommend it only for experienced gamers who don't mind second-guessing the rules on a few vital points and who don't mind doing mental bookkeeping. Too bad - this game could have been a contender."

Tony Watson reviewed Helltank in Ares Magazine #13 and commented that "Helltank isn't without its problems; the rules could have been tightened in some places and the type face used in the rules book approaches downright ugly, but it's an interesting little game, a sure winner for the asking price."

In Issue 27 of Simulacrum, Brian Train noted, "There are some interesting points in the design. One is the sequence of play, involving alternating activation of units – move one unit, attack with it, then your opponent gets a chance to respond, so most players are involved most of the time. Another is the changing relationships among families of weapons as technology levels advance." Train concluded, "the Combat Results Table is very bloody and the small map does not give much scope for maneuver."

In Issue 35 of Warning Order, Matt Irsik commented, "Helltank is not a bad game, but if you had Ogre, what was the point in spending time on this? This game got a bad rap, but in reality it's a good little tactical game that was overshadowed by too many other things."

== Other reviews and commentary ==
- Nexus #2
- The Grenadier #17
