= Invasion of the Air-eaters =

Board game

Cover art by Doug Potter

Invasion of the Air-eaters is a science fiction near-future board wargame published by Metagaming Concepts in 1979 in which aliens invaders attempt to replace the oxygen in Earth's atmosphere with sulfur dioxide.

== Gameplay ==
Invasion of the Air-eaters is a two-player microgame in which one player represents a race of alien creatures that starts an invasion of Earth with the intention of converting the atmosphere to sulfur dioxide to make it breathable for them. The other player takes the side of the Terrans, who try to stop the invasion and save Earth. The aliens begin the game with technical superiority, but the Terrans can try to overcome this by diverting industrial resources into research and development of new weapons.

The game's components consist of a 12" x 24" hex grid map of Earth, a 24-page rulebook, and 135 counters.

The game-turn begins with phases for alien production, air conversion and deployment, followed by a six-segmented movement phase that includes opportunities for both alien and Terran unit movement. A combat phase follows, with the aliens attacking first, followed by the Terrans. A sequence of Terran production and research towards newer and better weapons ends the turn.

== Publication history ==
In 1977, Metagaming Concepts pioneered a new type of small, fast and cheap solitaire or two-player wargame packaged in a ziplock bag titled Ogre. It proved popular, and Metagaming produced almost two dozen more MicroGames. Invasion of the Air-Eaters was the 12th game in the series, designed by Keith Gross, with cover art by Doug Potter, and published by Metagaming in 1979. Trout produced a sequel, The Air-Eaters Strike Back!, that was published by Metagaming in 1981.

Two more sequels, Again, Dangerous Air-Eaters and Battle for the Planet of the Air-Eaters, were planned, but Metagaming went out of business before they could be published.

== Reception ==
In the January 1980 edition of Dragon (Issue 33), Tony Watson recommended Invasion of the Air-Eaters, saying, "The game combines a number of different concepts in a blend that should please most gamers. A grand strategic situation is handled quite nicely with a small map and a handful of counters. The situation is classic, and the game mechanics bear this out. The opposing sides are quite different, both in the units available to them and the tactics needed to use those units properly. This differentiation adds to and builds on the game's colorful rationale, as well as providing the two players with the challenge of handling an opponent whose capabilities are not a mirror image of one's own. There are plenty of tactics here to be sought out, plenty of different plans and strategies to employ. The result is a game which, from this reviewer's stand-point, succeeds on all points."

In the first issue of Ares Magazine (March 1980), Steve List believed that the game was unfairly stacked against the Terrans, and rated the game as only 4 out of 9, saying, "The design should have made for an intriguing game of management as well as combat, but the aliens never lose. This may be a design statement that certain corporations have saturated the atmosphere with too much sulfur dioxide already, but it does ruin the play value of the game."

In the October 1980 issue of Fantastic, game designer Greg Costikyan wrote, "The most important problem is that the game seems to be unbalanced; I've yet to see the Terran player win."

In Issue 8 of Simulacrum, Luc Olivier noted, "Invasion of the Air-Eaters is introduced as a microgame, but in fact it is a full game with a lot of options. Both players must develop well-planned strategies to win." Olivier concluded, "All in all, IAE is a real gem: easy to learn, fast to play and always different, but I found it more difficult to win with the Alien."

In a retrospective review in Issue 35 of Warning Order, Matt Irsik called the game "One of the best microgames and there was definitely a lot going on this game." Irsik concluded, "Played on a global map, this game went far beyond what most microgames had offered. It's a good challenge for both sides and spawned a sequel."

== Other reviews and commentary ==
- Asimov's Science Fiction v7 n3 (1983 03)
