= Hitler's War (game) =

Strategy war game by Metagaming Concepts

- Metagaming Concepts edition, 1981
- Publishers: Metagaming Concepts; Avalon Hill
- Publication: 1981
- Players: 2–3
- Skills: Strategy

Avalon Hill edition, 1984

Hitler's War is a strategic level World War II board wargame first published by Metagaming Concepts in 1981, and then by Avalon Hill in 1984 that simulates the war from Operation Barbarossa to the Fall of Berlin. Critical reception was general favorable, using phrases like "very good", "An incredible bang for the buck", "single most satisfying game of its type" and "well thought out."

== Description ==
Hitler's War is a simulation of the Second World War in Europe for 2–3 players. The game is divided into three scenarios, each of which becomes more complex than the previous due to the addition of new rules:

1. Operation Barbarossa: This simulation for two players covers the period of war between Germany and the USSR after Germany's invasion in 1941. It is designed to introduce the players to the game's combat and movement system.
2. The Fall of Germany: This scenario for two or three players is linked to the end of the "Operation Barbarossa" scenario, and in addition to the Eastern Front versus the USSR, adds the Western Front opened by the Allies on D-Day. More complex rules are introduced, including sea movement, amphibious assaults, supply lines, and forts. As an option, the Allies' Eastern and Western forces can be divided between two players, turning this into a three-player game.
3. Campaign game: This simulates the entire war, 1939–1945, in four-month turns, and can be played by either two or three players. The basic campaign uses all of the rules introduced in the first two scenarios. The advanced campaign also adds complexity with the addition of submarine warfare and strategic bombing, counter-measures against both, neutral countries, tactical air power, paratroops, naval combat, and surrender. A further option is to include military research and development, which can lead to new weapons such as the V-1 and V-2 rockets, and even atomic bombs.

=== Components ===
Both the Metagaming Concepts and Avalon Hill boxed sets have the following components:

- 360 die-cut cardboard counters
- map (a 17" x 22" paper map in the Metagaming Concepts version, a 16" x 22" cardboard map in the Avalon Hill version)
- 3 player aid sheets
- 24-page rule book
- a six-sided die

=== Movement ===
Each side is given 12 army group counters that can hold up to 10 strength points. These counters can be moved an unlimited distance between controlled hexes, and strength points can be freely shuffled between army groups.

=== Combat ===
Once adjacent to an enemy army, the attacker declares which of their armies will attack. The defender then fires first, totalling the defending army's Strength Points versus the attacker's Strength Points and rolling a die on the Combat Resolution Table (CRT), indicating how many Strength Points the attacker loses. Once that is resolved, the attacker does the same thing. Next, the attacker may attempt to move into the defender's hex, success being dependent on the defender's remaining Strength Points and the attacker's number of mechanized units. If the attacker is successful in overcoming the defender, the same attacking army group may continue to attempt to advance in the same turn, and in blitzkrieg style, can repeatedly attack and advance as long as each attack is successful.

=== Industrial units ===
Each area of the map has a certain number of Industrial Units (IUs). Once movement and combat have been completed, each side adds up how many IUs it controls, which then determines each side's budget for purchasing new Strength Points, repairing IUs damaged by conquest, and using them as a supply source.

=== Victory conditions ===
In a two-player campaign game, the Allies win if Germany is defeated on or before April 1945. In a three-player game, the winning side is determined by the ratio of IUs owned by each player when Germany surrenders or by the summer of 1945.

=== Playing time ===
Although the box lists the playing time as 1½ to 5 hours, reviewer Ken Rolston estimated that the full campaign game with three players would take 5–6 hours with experienced players.

== Publication history ==
Hitler's War was designed by Keith Gross, with graphics by Norman Royal, Trace Hallowell, and Jeff Boobar, and was published by Metagaming Concepts in 1981 as the first in their "Metahistory" series of games. In a departure from Metagaming's previous microgame/pocket game releases in small flat boxes or ziplock bags with paper sheets of counters, Hitler's War was a full-sized boxed set, with die-cut cardboard counters.

Metagaming Concepts subsequently published two more games in the Metahistory series of boxed sets in 1981: The Trojan War, and Command at Sea.

Following the demise of Metagaming Concepts in 1983, Avalon Hill bought the rights to Hitler's War and Stellar Conquest, republishing both of them in 1984.

== Reception ==
In the May 1982 edition of Dragon (Issue #61), Tony Watson thought Metagaming Concepts' new large boxed set format "marks an important improvement quality for this company's products." He found the rulebook was "amply illustrated and remarkably free of glitches, typos and misspellings." However, he criticized the decision to print important charts on the back of the rulebook, "which can cause considerable wear and tear on the booklet after a short bout of page-flipping." Watson found the positioning and movement rules "rather innovative." Although he found the first two scenarios and the basic campaign good, "the advanced campaign game adds the chrome and options that make a good game into an excellent one." Comparing this game to Avalon Hill's Third Reich, Watson thought that "Hitler's War treats strategic warfare against enemy production in a more interesting manner. I found the production rules in Hitler's War, including the technology section and the geographically based IUs (as compared to the more abstract Basic Resource Points used in Third Reich), to be more challenging." He concluded, "For gaming enthusiasts with any interest in World War II and/or grand strategic conflict, Hitler's War is highly recommended."

In Issue 36 of Phoenix (March–April 1982), Nick Palmer had some problems with aspects of the Metagaming edition, but also called it "a very good game indeed, possibly the best one to appear on the market for several years." Palmer concluded, "Unless you are totally uninterested in strategy you will be cheating yourself out of a real treat if you don't shell out six pounds."

In Issue 18 of the British magazine The Wargamer, Paul King reviewed the Metagaming edition, saying, "A well thought out game [...] Hitler's War is a welcome, and refreshing, addition to the Metagaming range. However whilst it plays well in both a solo and two player situation, it is at its best as a three player game."

A review of the Avalon Hill edition appeared in Issue 30 of The Grenadier, which noted, "Hitler's War is the single most satisfying game of its type and retains a level of playability such games as AH's Third Reich and SPI's Wehrmacht could never achieve. The game is ingenious in the extreme and deserves to be played widely."

In Issue 73 of Fire & Movement, Terry Lee Coleman reviewed the Avalon Hill edition, commenting, "It is possible to mount a blitzkrieg, fortify Moscow, launch D-Day, invade neutrals and have wild armored melees in the North African desert [...] Each side may attempt to win the war through technology, realizing that their advances may be stolen by the other side." Coleman concluded, "The depth of strategy is truly remarkable — the game rarely plays the same way twice."

In a retrospective review in Issue 12 of Simulacrum, Joe Scoleri noted, "At its best, Metagaming managed to pack a lot into a small package. Melee and Ogre/GEV are good examples. Hitler's War is another. An incredible bang for the buck when released at $7, this great value was no more when Avalon Hill put it out as a book case boxed game at more than twice the original price." However, Scoleri admitted that "While no longer the same bargain, the improved components of the AH edition brought greater playability to what was already an eminently playable game."

== Reviews ==
- Moves #59, p23-24
- Games #67

== See also ==
- Hitler's War – 1977 history book by David Irving
