= Lynn Willis =

American game designer (1955–2013)

- Born: c. 1955; United States
- Died: January 18, 2013 (aged c. 58); United States
- Occupations: Game designer, writer
- Notable work: Godsfire; Olympica; Holy War

Lynn Willis (c. 1955 - January 18, 2013) was a wargame and role-playing game designer, best known for his work with Metagaming Concepts, Game Designers' Workshop (GDW), and Chaosium.

== Biography ==
Willis began by designing science fiction wargames for Metagaming Concepts, starting with Godsfire in 1976. Here he also designed two titles in the MicroGames range: Olympica (1978) and Holy War (1979). Chaosium published Lords of the Middle Sea (1978), the year when Willis joined Chaosium. GDW published Bloodtree Rebellion (1979).

Willis's relationship with Chaosium proved enduring. Here he turned to role-playing games, helping the company's founder Greg Stafford trim and refine the RuneQuest rules into Basic Role-Playing. These rules would serve as the base for many of Chaosium's RPG lines. He wrote the Call of Cthulhu campaign The Masks of Nyarlathotep (1984) with Larry DiTillio. Willis also had design credits for Worlds of Wonder (1982) and the Ringworld RPG (1984).

With other Chaosium employees, he co-wrote the Ghostbusters RPG for West End Games, which won the H.G. Wells Award for Best Role-playing Rules of 1986. Willis co-designed the fifth edition of Call of Cthulhu with Sandy Petersen, and when Keith Herber departed from Chaosium in 1994, Willis replaced him as the editor of the Cthulhu line. He worked with Petersen again for the sixth edition of Call of Cthulhu. Willis created the game Elric! with Richard Watts as a new Basic Role-Playing version of Stormbringer. After Greg Stafford left the company in 1998, Willis stayed on with Chaosium as its editor-in-chief.

Willis left Chaosium in late 2008 due to ill health; at the time, he was the longest serving employee at Chaosium, having 30 years of experience with the company.

== Death ==
On September 11, 2008, the President of Chaosium, Charlie Krank, informed the public that Willis had been diagnosed with Parkinson's disease. Willis died on January 18, 2013.
