= Hitler's War (disambiguation) =

Hitler's War is a biography of Adolf Hitler by David Irving

Hitler's War may also refer to:

- Hitler's War, military history book by Edwin Palmer Hoyt
- Hitler's War (novel), war novel, part of The War That Came Early series by Harry Turtledove
- Hitler's War (game), strategy war game by Metagaming Concepts
- World War II

== See also ==
- Hitler's Peace: A Novel of the Second World War by Philip Kerr
