= Hot Spot (board game) =

Board game

Hot Spot is a science fiction board wargame published by Metagaming Concepts in 1979 that simulates the battle for possession of a molten planet.

== Description ==
=== Setting ===
Chiros is a hot planet currently being mined for energy by the Ziegler Corporation using floating platforms called "crustals" that drift about on the molten surface of the planet. A group of rebels called the Technocrats arrives in force to seize the mining operation from Ziegler Corp.

=== Gameplay ===
Hot Spot is a 2-player wargame in which one player controls the Ziegler Corporation forces, and the other player controls the Technocrats.

The Ziegler player sets up forces on 14 "crustal" platforms. Most of these drift about, but the largest crustal in the center of the map does not move.

The Technocrats arrive via Attack Platforms; however, these are not designed for the heat of the planet and break apart after four turns, spilling all occupants into the lava. Before that happens, each Attack Platform must take control of a crustal in order to offload the soldiers safely.

=== Victory conditions ===
The Technocrat player wins by taking control of the large central crustal with an engineering squad. The Ziegler player wins by preventing this.

Cover of Analog #27, inspiration for W.G. Armintrout's game

== Publication history ==
In 1977, Metagaming Concepts pioneered the microgame, a small and relatively simple solitaire or two-person wargame packaged in a ziplock bag. Over the next five years, the company produced almost two dozen games in their MicroGame series. Hot Spot was the 15th game in the series, designed by W.G. Armintrout and published in 1979.

Armintrout got the idea for the game's setting from two sources: a piece of artwork for the story "Collision Course" on the cover of the July 1972 issue of Analog that showed a mountain rising above a sea of lava; and a children's game he used to play with his sister that featured a rotating plastic mountain.

== Reception ==
In Issue 29 of The Space Gamer, American game designer Steve Jackson liked the game, saying "On the whole, it's a good game — easily the best MicroGame to appear recently. If you like SF tactical games, buy it."

In the October 1980 issue of Fantastic, game designer Greg Costikyan wrote that the game "shows that all hope for Metagaming is not lost; they're still capable of producing excellent work ... Well worth getting."

In Issue 27 of Simulacrum, Brian Train noted, "On the face of it, this is an interesting situation, combining constraints of numbers, strength, mobility and time." Train found the game was relatively simple, except for the rules concerning the crustals' movement, collisions and damage taken. However, he found the simple victory condition "tends to stereotype play."

In a retrospective review in Issue 35 of Warning Order, Matt Irsik commented that Hot Spot was "Probably the last of the 'good' MicroGames before a wave of mediocrity hit the series." He called the game "A very interesting concept and game system" and concluded "Not a great game, but definitely good sci fi and fun for a few hours."
