= Lords of the Middle Sea =

Fantasy tabletop wargame

- Cover by Gene Day
- Designers: Lynn Willis
- Illustrators: Gene Day; William Church
- Publishers: Chaosium
- Publication: 1978; 47 years ago
- Genres: Fantasy board wargame

Lords of the Middle Sea is a 1978 board wargame published by Chaosium. Designed by Lynn Willis, with art by William Church and Gene Day.

== Gameplay ==
Lords of the Middle Sea is a game which North America has been drastically altered by cataclysms by 2401 A.D.

== Reception ==
W. G. Armintrout reviewed Lords of the Middle Sea in The Space Gamer No. 21. Armintrout commented that "This is a game which tries too hard. It has no tactical richness, despite the pretty pictures in the rulebook. The role-playing is trivial and gets in the way."

Eric Goldberg reviewed Lords of the Middle Sea in Ares Magazine #1, rating it a 7 out of 9. Goldberg commented that "this game is not a fantasy game with a science fiction background; rather it is a well-balanced presentation of medieval forces doing battle with the aid of supernatural and technological help. While this is a fairly simple strategic game, there is enough of substance to warrant several playings."

== Reviews ==
- Analog Science Fiction and Fact

== Roleplaying game ==
In 2020, Chaosium announced that the Lords of the Middle Sea setting was to be the basis of a tabletop role-playing game using Basic Roleplaying and written by John Snead.
