= Trojan War (disambiguation) =

The Trojan War was a legendary conflict in Greek mythology.

Trojan War may also refer to:

- Trojan War (film), 1997
- The Trojan War (board game)
- "The Trojan War" (Dream On), a 1990 television episode
