= Bloodtree Rebellion =

- Artwork by Stephen Fabian, 1979
- Publishers: Game Designers' Workshop
- Years active: 1979
- Genres: Board wargame

Bloodtree Rebellion, subtitled "Guerilla Warfare on the Planet Somber", is a science fiction board wargame published by Game Designers' Workshop (GDW) in 1979. The game started as a guerrilla wargame based on the Vietnam War, but was changed to a science fiction theme due to the social and political divide over the war in the United States.

== Gameplay ==
Bloodtree Rebellion is a two-player game involving guerilla warfare on the planet of Somber. On one side, the Mykin military controls the planet with an iron fist and a vast array of weapons. On the other side, humans — and eventually indigenous aliens — rebel against the Mykin in a series of hit-and-run city raids. After one such raid, the rebels flee into the Bloodtree Forest to escape from Mykin retaliation, and the game devolves into a Vietnam War-style of combat, with the technologically superior Mykin seeking out the rebels in the jungle.

=== Components ===
The game box holds:

- 22" x 28" paper hex grid map scaled at 5 km (3.1 mi) per hex
- three city maps
- 480 counters
- rule book

== Publication history ==
In the late 1970s, Lynn Willis submitted a Vietnam War game to GDW. Due to the social and political unpopularity of the war, which had recently ended, Willis was told to rework it into a science fiction game. The result was Bloodtree Rebellion, published by GDW in 1979 with cover art by Stephen Fabian. Game designer Brian Train noted that everyone at the time knew that Willis was hiding a Vietnam War game behind the science fiction facade, saying, "When it was published, people immediately saw what had been substituted for what — they knew what they were playing."

== Reception ==
In the March 1980 edition of Ares Magazine (Issue #1), David Ritchie gave Bloodtree Rebellion an average rating of 6 out of 9, saying, "if you remove the sf trappings, you have a very accurate treatise on the 'little wars' of our own age. Somewhat complex, but playable within a few hours. Buck Rogers goes to Vietnam."

In the March-April 1980 edition of The Space Gamer (Issue No. 27), Keith Gross gave a thumbs down, commenting, ""Bloodtree Rebellion is a game to be admired, not played. The political system is innovative and intriguing, the game and background are well-integrated, and guerrilla war is simulated very well. Those interested in these things will find the game interesting. Those who want a game to play over and over should look elsewhere."

In the January 1981 edition of Dragon (Issue 45), Roberto Camino liked the game, calling it "one of the most flavorful sci-fi entries", but he warned about the game's many rules, saying, "Designer Lynn Willis conjures up a memorable world in vivid detail and breathes life into it with an innovative game system, but at the price of considerable complexity."
