= WarpWar =

Science fiction board wargame published in 1977

- Cover of second (boxed) edition, 1980
- Designers: Howard M. Thompson
- Publishers: Metagaming Concepts
- Publication: 1977
- Genres: Science fiction, microgame
- Players: 2
- Playing time: 30 minutes

WarpWar is a science fiction board wargame published by Metagaming Concepts in 1977 that simulates interstellar combat. It was the fourth in Metagaming's MicroGame series.

== Description ==
WarpWar is a two-player game of interstellar combat in which each player designs their own starships and then do battle.

=== Gameplay ===
Each player is given a pool of Build Points with which to build starships from a list of standard components. They then send their starships to various systems. If two opposing ships occupy the same star system, then combat begins. Players write orders for each ship involved, allocating power to various systems, as well as basic combat tactics such as Attack, Dodge or Retreat.

Several scenarios for set-up are given, the main difference being the number of build points that are given to each player to start the scenario. The game components are a 14 in × 8 in (360 mm × 200 mm) paper map, thin cardstock counters and an 18-page rulebook.

== Publication history ==
In 1977, Metagaming Concepts pioneered a new type of small, fast and cheap solitaire or two-player wargame packaged in a ziplock bag, and produced nearly two dozen games in the series over the next five years. The fourth was WarpWar, designed by company president Howard M. Thompson, and published in a ziplock bag with thin cardstock counters in 1977. Three years later, Metagaming republished the game in a slim plastic box with die-cut counters.

== Reception ==
In the August 1978 edition of Dragon (Issue 17), Tony Watson liked the game, saying, "Warp War is a very interesting game, full of fascinating ideas and concepts. The play doesn’t become stereotyped as the forces involved and tactics used always change. Players are allowed to come up with their own ideas of sound ship design and enjoy the satisfaction of outwitting their opponents on the combat matrix."

Steve List reviewed Warp War in Ares Magazine #8 and commented "Like many of the MicroGames, Warp War packs a goodly amount of interest into a small package." He wasn't impressed with the mechanism to show the passage of years saying,"There is a minor effort to show elapsed time effects, but it merely boils down to old ships being not as good as new ones." The one issue List had with the game was that improvements in technology did not affect everything, pointing out, "An irritating simplification lies in the fact that Tech Level affects only the amount of damage done in combat. It has no bearing on ship movement or the ability to score a hit in the first place." List also noted that the game was not set up for single players, commenting, "The game system is clean and playable, but poorly suited for solitaire play." He concluded "The rules encourage players to make up their own where they want more complication. Given such official 'approval,' the game can be viewed as a starting point for whatever complexities the players can mutually agree upon."

In the 1980 book The Complete Book of Wargames, game designer Jon Freeman was not very impressed with the game, commenting, "there's not much new here except another try at a diceless Combat Results Table. This one is not so obnoxious as some, but since the options are unequal, combat gets tedious, and play can become somewhat stereotyped at both the tactical and strategic levels." He also noted "For a small, short game, there is a great deal of (admittedly uncomplicated) bookkeeping involved." Freeman concluded by giving the game an Overall Evaluation of "Good", saying,. "As a whole, this is probably the common impression of microgames: they are not something you'd play for years, but can be short, quick fun for a while."

In the October 1980 issue of Fantastic, game designer Greg Costikyan called the game "rather mundane [..] combat was resolved in an extended and rather boring tactical system. The limited area of the game-map did not allow for sufficient strategic flexibility, and games became stereotyped after a few playings."

In a retrospective review in Issue 35 of Warning Order, Matt Irsik commented "This was an unusual sci- fi game in that no dice are used for combat. [...] The game is essentially a mini-campaign system that still holds up well today."

== Reviews ==
- Moves #37, p17
- Magia i Miecz (Issue 1 – 1993) (Polish)
