= Alien Contact (board game) =

Board game

Alien Contact is a 1983 board game published by Phoenix Enterprises.

== Gameplay ==
Alien Contact is a science fiction game involving imperialism in space, in which the Council of Six plans to divide a substantial region of space based on the outcome of warfare.

== Reception ==
Steve List reviewed Alien Contact in Ares Magazine #17 and commented that "This one could be a lot of tune for multi-player situations, but only if someone tightens up the rules and all the players agree to the fixes."

Tony Watson reviewed Alien Contact in Space Gamer No. 69. Watson commented that "Alien Contact is an honest effort, and certainly not the sort of unmitigated turkey that all too often winds up on the game store shelves, but it's not particularly innovative or exciting. If you don't mind plunking down [the money] on a game that is just OK, then this might be a good choice. More discriminating players should seek to play out their imperialistic ambitions through a more suitable vehicle."

== Reviews ==
- Asimov's Science Fiction v8 n2 (1984 02)
