= Master of the Amulets =

Tabletop role-playing game adventure

Master of the Amulets is a 1981 fantasy role-playing game adventure published by Metagaming Concepts.

== Plot summary ==
Master of the Amulets is an adventure intended for the Melee and Wizard systems, and takes place in the locale of Dirringar's Valley.

== Publication history ==
Shannon Appelcline noted that "Master of the Amulets (1981), MicroQuest #7, showed an attempt to push the solo adventure envelope, as it wasn't built around the typical numbered paragraphs of the genre."

== Reception ==
Stefan Jones reviewed Master of the Amulets in The Space Gamer No. 49. Jones commented that "For all its faults, I'd still recommend Master of the Amulets to players of Melee and Wizard who want to try an overland adventure but can't spring the money for TFT."

== Reviews ==
- Pegasus #10 (Oct. 1982)
