= Security Station =

Tabletop role-playing game adventure

Security Station is a 1981 fantasy role-playing game adventure for The Fantasy Trip, published by Metagaming Concepts.

== Plot summary ==
Security Station is an adventure in which the player characters explore an ancient fallout shelter, which was constructed using highly advanced technology and brought to Cidri many years ago using Mnoren magic.

== Reception ==
William A. Barton reviewed Security Station in The Space Gamer No. 38. Barton commented that "Security Station should prove an interesting and possibly profitable/fatal adventure for your TFT characters."

== Reviews ==
- Pegasus #10 (Oct. 1982)
