= Nightmare House =

1983 horror-themed board game

- Cover of Ares #15, art by Jeff Easley
- Designers: David Marshall
- Illustrators: Jeff Easley
- Publishers: TSR
- Publication: 1983
- Genres: Horror

Nightmare House is a horror board game published by TSR under their SPI marque in 1983.

== Description ==
Nightmare House is a gothic horror board game for one to five players. Set in the cursed Darkholm Manor, players take on the role of ghost hunters who explore the house, confront supernatural 'haunts,' and engage in psychic battles on an astral map to exorcise a malevolent Entity. The game starts at 6 pm and lasts for 12 turns, representing a single night. It features a detailed three-level floor plan, a separate map used for astral combat, and a unique astral combat system that uses psyche, soul, and astral body tokens to simulate ghostly encounters.

=== Gameplay: multiplayer ===
One player, the House, takes the role of the Evil Entity that has taken over Darkholm Manor. The other players choose one of twelve Hunters, each with its own strengths and weaknesses, and enter the mansion at 6 pm, seeking to confront and exorcise the Evil Entity. The House sends haunts to disrupt and possess the Hunters.

As the Hunters "clean" each room, they discover useful items to help them in their quest. However, the House grows stronger as time passes.<refe name=sg />

=== Gameplay: Solo ===
The game can also be played by one person, who takes the role of a solitary Hunter against The House, facing randomized encounters.

=== Victory conditions ===
If the Hunters manage to exorcise the Evil Entity by the end of the twelfth turn (6 am), the Hunters win. Otherwise, the House wins.

== Publication history ==
In 1982, the board wargame manufacturer SPI ran into financial trouble, and solved the issue by negotiating a promissory note from TSR that was backed by SPI's assets. Shortly after SPI cleared their books of all debts, TSR called the note, and took over SPI. Although TSR shut down production of several SPI magazines, they continued to publish SPI's science fiction games magazine Ares. In Issue 15 (Fall 1983), the horror board game Nightmare House was included as a free pull-out game, designed by David Marshall, with cover art by TSR artist Jeff Easley. It came with a 16-page rulebook, 200 counters, and one 22" х 34" mapsheet. TSR also published a boxed set of the game, which included a plastic tray for the counters.

== Reception ==
Rick Swan reviewed Nightmare House for Fantasy Gamer magazine and stated that "Nightmare House cries out for the same kind of treatment given to an earlier Ares game, Return of the Stainless Steel Rat. A similar paragraph system which generates a real mystery to be unraveled by characters searching rooms for clues and fighting 'haunts' along the way would have made for a challenging and exciting gothic horror game. As it stands, Nightmare House is little more than an underdeveloped game system with a lot of potentially great ideas."

In Issue 71 of Space Gamer, Matthew Costello commented, "Nightmare House may have been the best board game of 1983. That it is the finest boardgame dealing with the supernatural is undoubtedly true." Costello also suggested that although the game could be integrated into existing campaigns of several role-playing games such as Mercenaries, Spies and Private Eyes, Gangbusters or Daredevils, "it's a natural match for Call of Cthulhu." After providing an outline of how this could be accomplished, Costello concluded "In summary: If you don't have Nightmare House, by all means get it. . . soon. (Who knows if TSR will allow this gem to disappear?) Use it with your party of Investigators as a side-trip, or as a main course. It will give one and all a healthy quota of gooseflesh." Also writing a review in the March 1984 issue of Games, Costello noted "The game is exciting and surprisingly scary. Solitaire play works well — though defeating the House with only one character, as the rules recommend, is no easy chore."
