= Down with the King (game) =

1981 political card game by Avalon Hill

- Other names: Krone von Alba
- Designers: Glenn Rahman; Kenneth Rahman; Alan R. Moon
- Illustrators: List: Ulrich Allgaier; Jost Amman; Albrecht Dürer; Charles Kibler; Thomas Lamm; Alan R. Moon; Dale Sheaffer; Charles Wheatley; Mark Wheatley
- Publishers: Avalon Hill
- Publication: 1981; 45 years ago
- Years active: 1981–?
- Genres: Board game
- Languages: English
- Players: 2–6
- Playing time: 120'
- Age range: 12+

Down With the King is a political card game for 2-6 players produced by Avalon Hill in 1981. Each player takes the role of a noble in the fictional nation of Fandonia during the European Baroque age (roughly 1600-1750), and by diplomacy, betrayal, and political maneuvering, attempts to depose the current monarch, and place his lackey on the throne.

The game was designed by Glenn Rahman, Kenneth Rahman, and Alan R. Moon. It is sometimes described as a "Fantasy Political Game", but has no inherently supernatural elements.

== Gameplay ==
Each turn comprises a sequence of random events and player actions. Players aim to enhance their character's skills, influence, and prestige, earn the loyalty of non-player characters, secure political offices, destabilize the reigning monarch, and disrupt rival factions' efforts. Eventually, when a player believes their faction has amassed sufficient power and the reigning monarch is sufficiently weakened, they may attempt to usurp the throne and install a royal character (or pretender) of their choosing. A player who controls the monarch for three consecutive turns emerges victorious.

Besides characters, represented as cards, a player controls a certain number of Influence Points, or IPs, spent as "money" to accomplish actions, and Prestige Points, or PPs, which serve as a limit to the number of characters they can control. The player also has a set of cards and opportunity counters that restrict the actions they can take. Actions include a vast array of options, including Dueling, Assassination, Travel Abroad, Advising the Monarch (requires an office), Escape (from abroad or hiding), Extradite a Wrongdoer (from abroad), Expose a Scandal, Intrigue (try to steal an opponent's card), Recruit a Character, Court Monarch's Favor, Fill a Vacant Office, Recruit by Treachery, Seduce a Character, Hold a Wedding, Consult Prestige Tables, and Solicit Bribes (requires an office). All these actions tend to award or take away PPs and IPs.

== Reception ==
Paul Manz reviewed Down with the King in The Space Gamer No. 48. Manz commented that "Down with the King is a pleasant change of pace, and a very enjoyable group game."
