= The Lords of Underearth =

Board game

- Designers: Keith Gross
- Illustrators: Trace Hallowell; Pat Hidy; Denis Loubet; Norman Royal
- Publishers: Metagaming Concepts
- Publication: 1981
- Genres: Fantasy

The Lords of Underearth, subtitled "Adventure in a Dwarven Labyrinth", is a board game published by Metagaming Concepts in 1981 as part of its MicroGame line that involves fantasy combat.

== Description ==
The Lords of Underearth is a game of warfare in a subterranean labyrinth called Underearth between orcs, dwarves, humans, and monsters. Four scenarios are included:

- "Pursuit": Humans invade Underearth and attempt to reach the dwarves' Great Hall.
- "Surprise Attack": Orcs attempt to break through the dwarven line in order to reach the Throne Room and kill the dwarven king.
- "Dragonfire": A dragon attacks the dwarves, seeking treasure.
- "Passage of Underearth": A small band of dwarves and humans attempt to sneak through Underearth, opposed by an orc and his followers.

Rules for how to integrate this game into The Fantasy Trip are also included.

== Publication history ==
Metagaming Concepts pioneered the concept of microgames. The Lords of Underearth, published in 1981, was the 18th game in this line, and was designed by Keith Gross, with artwork by Trace Hallowell, Pat Hidy, Denis Loubet, and Norman Royal.

Hobby Japan published a Japanese language edition in 1988.

== Reception ==
In Issue 38 of The Space Gamer , William A. Barton commented "The Lords of Underearth [...] qualifies as a game to be recommended to novice fantasy gamers and aficionados of The Fantasy Trip role-playing system. Fantasy veterans might find it an interesting diversion from their more complex endeavors as well."

Eric Goldberg reviewed The Lords of Underearth in Ares #10 and commented that "Lords demonstrates that small fantasy boardgames can be the result of quality work. The emphasis is on the simple and the playable, but never on the simplistic."

In Issue 27 of Simulacrum, Brian Train noted, "This game has more replay value than one might expect – the map is meant to be cut apart into geomorphic pieces, and there is a good variety of scenarios with differing objectives." Train also pointed out, "This dungeon-crawler is acknowledged to be one of the better later efforts of Metagaming, and is a good example of how a lot of play could still be crammed into a small box."

In Issue 35 of Warning Order, Matt Irsik called this "Another of you either love it or hate it type microgames that appeared at the end of the [MicroGame] series."

In a retrospective review of The Lords of Underearth in Black Gate, John O'Neill said "This is a fully featured game that offers a range of solitaire and 2-player scenarios deep in the heart of an ancient Dwarven fortress… all in 14 pages of rules and a box that can fit in your pocket. It's well worth a look."
