= Trailblazer (board game) =

Board game

Trailblazer is a science fiction microgame game published by Metagaming Concepts in 1981 that simulates interstellar trading. Critics found the game tedious, with an unexpectedly large amount of bookkeeping involved.

== Description ==
Trailblazer is a 2–4 player game in which each player controls an interstellar trading company. Critic Robert Kirk noted that the game has a noticeable flavor of the Nicholas van Rijn science fiction stories by Poul Anderson.

Players can buy goods on planets where they have ships or offices, then transport those goods to other planets where they will sell for more. However, prices fluctuate from world to world and from turn to turn based on supply and demand.

In addition, players can send their ships into unexplored space to discover new systems that will provide new trading goods, or become a new market for sales, or both.

Players must keep extensive records of their explorations, trades, purchases and sales.

=== Victory conditions ===
Play ends after a mutually-agreed-upon number of turns. The player with the most wealth in terms of ships, inventory and money is the winner.

== Publication history ==
In 1977, Metagaming Concepts pioneered the microgame, a small and relatively simple game packaged in a ziplock bag. Over the next five years, the company produced almost two dozen games in their MicroGame line. Trailblazer was the 20th game in the series, designed by Greg Costikyan and published in 1981.

== Reception ==
In The Space Gamer No. 50, Robert C. Kirk found the game unexpectedly tedious, saying, "Considering the time involved and the effort required, I would expect to find in Trailblazer some of the panoramic sweep of Stellar Conquest. It just isn't there. Lacking armed conflict, technological development, and the scope to develop really grand strategies, Trailblazer boils down to a game of shuttling consumer goods from world to world, turn after turn." Kirk concluded, "If you're allergic to record-keeping, shy away from this one. If you like expanding on existing games, it may be possible to use this one as an economic phase in games like Stellar Conquest."

In Issue 27 of Simulacrum, Brian Train advised against trying this game, saying "this would be a good game for you if you are the sort of person who derives a warm sense of satisfaction from filling out his tax return, again and again and again..."

In a retrospective review in Issue 35 of Warning Order, Matt Irsik recalled the extensive paperwork required, saying, "An empire building game in a small box that required a ton of paperwork. Games could go on for a very long time and there was a sameness to it that became a big turn off." Irsik concluded, "not necessarily a bad game (especially considering the price), but there were so many other games to play at the time that this one got the short end of the stick."

== Reviews ==
- Jeux & Stratégie #17
