= The Air-Eaters Strike Back! =

Board game

The Air-Eaters Strike Back! is a 1981 board game published by Metagaming Concepts.

== Gameplay ==
The Air-Eaters Strike Back! is a sequel to Invasion of the Air-eaters in which the fight has extended beyond Earth to other nearby planetary bodies in the Solar System.

== Reception ==
William A. Barton reviewed The Air-Eaters Strike Back! in The Space Gamer No. 44. Barton commented that "The Air-Eaters Strike Back! is a strong initial offering for the new metagames and an enjoyable SF game, either as a sequel to Invasion or in its own right."
