= The Fury of the Norsemen =

Board wargame published in 1980

Artwork by Pat Tidy, 1980

The Fury of the Norsemen is a two-player board game published by Metagaming Concepts in 1980.

== Gameplay ==
The Fury of the Norsemen is a 2-player wargame that simulates the historical Viking raids of the 9th and 10th centuries on settlements in Western Europe. The map shows a generic English or Irish coastal village, with farms and a manor house. One player controls Viking raiders, while the other player defends the town with soldiers and villagers.

Although the Vikings are more powerful than the villagers, the village priest can try to call down God's wrath to destroy one Viking unit.

The game comes boxed with a 16-page rulebook, 126 thin cardstock counters, a 14" x 12" three-color map and one six-sided die.

== Publication history ==
In 1977 Metagaming Concepts pioneered the concept of the microgame, a small game packaged in a ziplock bag or small flat box, with the release of Ogre. They subsequently published almost two dozen microgames with science fiction or fantasy themes. In 1980, Metagaming turned to historical themes, publishing five microgames as part of the MicroHistory series. The fourth was The Fury of the Norsemen, designed by Kevin Hendryx, with artwork by Pat Tidy.

== Reception ==
In the April 1981 edition of The Space Gamer (Issue No. 38), Paul Manz recommended the game, saying, "The Fury of the Norsemen is a quick playing, easy game. If you have courageous and barbaric spirit [...] then this game is for you."

In the June 1981 edition of Dragon (Issue 50) Tony Watson described the game as "fast, furious and fluid" but said there were a number of problems with it. Lack of a proper set-up for the villagers prevented a balanced game. Watson also did not like a "divine wrath" rule, where the local priest can literally call down God's vengeance, resulting in the destruction of a Viking unit. "This sort of rule really has no place in a game that purports to be historical. This heavenly artillery seems to be something of a balancer against the power of the Viking military, but surely some less fantastic method could have been found to even things out." However, overall Watson believed that this game "catches much of the excitement of the lightning-fast and brutal operations of the Vikings."

In a retrospective review in Issue 35 of Warning Order, Matt Irsik commented that the game was "certainly playable, well thought out, and probably should have received more attention at the time."

In Issue 27 of Simulacrum, Brian Train commented, "Fury of the Norsemen is a fun little game that plays relatively well. The plunder mechanic and victory conditions are fairly innovative, and the theme fills a niche that is otherwise lacking."
