= Midgard (role-playing game) =

German tabletop role-playing game

- Original rulebook
- Designers: Jürgen E. Franke
- Publishers: Midgard Press
- Publication: 1981 (1st edition); 1985 (2nd edition); 1989 (3rd edition); 2000 (4th edition); 2013 (5th edition)
- Years active: 1981–present
- Genres: Fantasy
- Systems: Custom
- Chance: Dice rolling
- Skills: Role-playing, improvisation, tactics, arithmetic

Midgard is a fantasy role-playing game from Germany. It was the first role-playing game published in German and the first to be created in Germany.

Midgard is also the name of the world on which the game is usually played (originally named Magira but later renamed due to legal problems). However, the rules of the game are designed in a way that makes it possible to play Midgard on nearly every world.

Despite its name, the game doesn't have anything in common with the mythological Midgard.

== Game mechanics ==
Midgard, in its 1985 edition, was the first role-playing game that had a system which separated action points (AP) from hit points (HP). While the number of action points increases with the character's level, hit points usually remain constant. This has the effect that experienced characters can fight longer and cast more spells, but a direct hit can still inflict serious damage.

The characters in Midgard have levels (called "degrees") that are used in regards to how much the character has learned in their life. It is rarely used as a prerequisite for learning something. Action points and base attributes, determined by dice (a D100), may also be increased by using experience points.

There are 15 character classes, and the class a player picks will determine how difficult it is for a character to learn a skill. Most skills can be learned by almost every class, but some classes may not benefit from learning certain skills; a Warrior can learn spell casting, but their strength attribute is higher than their intellect attribute (spell casting).

For dice, the system uses a d100 (usually replaced by two d10), a d20, the classic d6 and, since the latest edition, also the d3 (the number indicates the side number of the dice. See game dice).

Midgard uses D20 for attacks, spells and skills. An action succeeds if the sum of the rolled value and the corresponding success score (usually +4 to +20) is at least 20. The success score depends on the weapon or skill but is the same for all magical spells. Spells, however, cost action points and differ in the number of points they cost.

For attacks and attack spells, the damage is rolled with D6. The number of dice and the modifier depend on the weapon or spell used for the attack. For example, a dagger may inflict 1D6-1 (roll one D6 and subtract 1) whereas a lance may inflict up to 3D6+3 (roll three D6 and add three, in case of a mounted charge). A damage modifier (ranging from -3 to +5, depending on strength and dexterity) is added to the damage roll.

The attacked player may try to parry or evade by rolling a D20. This is successful if the roll plus the character's defense or resistance score is equal to or larger than the sum achieved by the attacker. The character only loses exhaustion points (light damage). Otherwise, the character loses both hit and action points (heavy damage), whereby the number of hit points (but not action points) lost may be reduced depending on the character's armor.

D100 are used for tests against the character's attributes (e.g. strength or magical talent), which range from 1 to 100. The player rolls a D100 (usually replaced with two D10) and the test is successful if the roll is below or equal to the character's attribute score.

Compared to Advanced Dungeons and Dragons or The Dark Eye (editions 1, 2 and 3), Midgard (and The Dark Eye editions 4 and 5) does not emphasise the character's level very much. Characters may learn at any time and are only limited by their experience points. The level increases when the player has spent a certain number of experience points. They may then spend more experience points to increase the number of exhaustion points and there is a slight chance (determined by D100) that the score of one of the base attributes increases.

== Game World ==
Midgard has many similarities to J. R. R. Tolkien's fictional setting for The Lord of the Rings. The player frequently encounters humans as well as other races like elves, dwarves, and halflings. Dragons, trolls and various forms of magic are also common. Midgard's world is much more culturally diverse than Tolkien's "European" Middle-earth. In the game, most earthly cultures, with the exception of North America, appear in slightly modified or combined forms. The world of Midgard is designed to be more archaic; it is largely influenced by the early Middle Ages, but also includes regions that are cut off from the rest of the world, meaning that they are still very much in the Stone Age. Its central locations are developing and are on their way into the Renaissance Era. Myrkgard was published 22 years after the release of Midgard. It offers a parallel world that is much darker than Midgard.

=== Geography ===
The known part of Midgard consists of four continents with the Sea of Five Winds lying between them. Vesternesse, a Europe-like continent, is located in the northwest and borders the sea. It contains the countries Alba, Chryseia, Erainn, Ywerddon, Clanngadarn and Fuardain. South of Vesternesse lies Lamaran with the Coastal States, Eschar, Urruti, Buluga and the Ikenga Basin. East of the Sea lies Sirao, a continent inspired by Asia, made up of Waeland, Moravod, the Tegar steppe, Aran, Medjis, KanThaiPan, Rawindra and the Minangpahit island kingdom. In the far west of the known world lies the continent of Huaxal, which includes Nahuatlan, a state with indigenous South American culture, and south of it the Neolithic "Fire Islands". In the middle of the Sea of Five Winds lies the Valian Archipelago, the remnant of the empire that fell in the "War of the Mages."

== Midgard's History ==
In 1978, Jürgen Franke self-published a guidebook called Empires of Magira. It was set in the fantasy world of Magira (based on the novels by author Hugh Walker and from a tabletop simulation game named Armageddon).

This game had to be abandoned due to licensing disputes, but was later improved and re-released in 1981 under a new name: Midgard.

Midgard continued to develop the world of Magira. There is a neutral "rule priest" in Midgard as opposed to a named god. The game master and players can choose which ruling deity they can devote themselves to. Midgard prefers to use language such as "game master" instead of "master" and "adventurer" instead of "hero".

In 1983, the Midgard II expansion was released.

In 1985 the revised guides appeared in the two books Midgard - The Fantasy Role Playing Game and Midgard - Key to Adventure. The guides were almost completely changed. There were around 20 classes instead of the initial four. These guides also introduced the stamina point/life point distinction, extensive system of skills, and more. This was the last edition that featured the world of Magira (see appendix), and the last edition that was published by J. Franke's publishing house for fantasy and science fiction role-playing games (VF&SF).

In 1989 and 1991 the game manufacturer, Klee Spiele, released the third, only slightly changed, edition of the rules as a boxed set for the first time. From now on, the underlying world was also called "Midgard" and was closely based on Magira. Some country names were left unchanged.

The Adventure Begins, a stripped-down entry-level box set, was published in 1999 by Pegasus Press. This was largely based on the rules of the fourth edition, which appeared in following years. But the fourth edition was also moderately changed in comparison to the 1985 and 1989 editions.

In 2000, after a long break, Midgard - The Arcanum, the magic part of the fourth edition of the rules, was published as a hardcover. It was followed by Midgard - The Fantasy Role Playing Game in 2001, Midgard - The Compendium in 2002, with a few additional rules and Midgard - The Bestiary in 2003, which describes the various creatures of Midgard.

In 2006, Midgard - Masters of the Spheres, the last part of this series was published under publishing label Midgard Press. For the 25th anniversary of the role-playing game in 2006, the complete set of rules was published in a three-volume deluxe edition, including The Codex, The Bestarium and The Arcanum, again under the old VFSF publishing house (which produced the 1985 edition). With The Codex, The Bestarium and The Arcanum, the complete Midgard rulebook has been published as a deluxe edition.

In October 2007, after long preparatory work and numerous test games, Midgard was released as a licensed product and the board game became a strategy game in the well-known Midgard world. A comic series called The Rune Blades was created especially for role-playing beginners. The first volume, Rune Blades 1: Blade Seeker, in the multi-part series begins with a comic introducing the events and game character. It was also published in October.

In 2008, the publisher began reissuing out-of-print adventure guides as PDFs available for purchase. In addition, a completely new adventure guide was published as a purchasable PDF instead of a print publication. The sequel, Runeblades 2: Wolfswinter, was released in February 2008, and finally, Finsterma was released in June of the same year.

In 2009, the fan community received the revised new edition of the Alba source book, which had been out of print for a long time. It included the first cultural description of one of the non-human peoples with a source book on the culture of the dwarves. Three novels were published in the fan community explaining the background of the game world. In 2010, two completely new official source books and additional novels from the fan community were published.

In 2013, a fundamentally revised new edition of the basic rules, Midgard 5, was published by Midgard Press. For the first time, the player community was involved in the revision process and many wishes, experiences and suggestions were taken into account. In the new edition, the rules were simplified and reoriented towards beginners.

In June 2021 it was announced that Midgard would be further developed and published by Pegasus Spiele in 2024. In this context, a sixth edition of the rules is set to appear, and new source material will describe a parallel world to Midgard.

A new edition of the first rules edition was published in November 2021. The edition combines the Midgard 1 and 2 rulebooks in one hardcover.

Download codes for the PDF versions of the guides and bonus digital content come with the purchase of the printed guides.

According to the workshop report, the following goals were pursued during the revision:

1. Ease of use, especially for newbies
2. Compatibility with Midgard 4
3. Simplification
