= They've Invaded Pleasantville =

Board game

They've Invaded Pleasantville is a 1981 board game designed by Michael Pierre Price published by TSR.

== Gameplay ==
They've Invaded Pleasantville is a game for two players in which the town player tries to alert the other townsfolk of an alien invasion and stop them from controlling the minds of the whole town. The alien player tries to secretly take over all the townfolk.

== Cover art ==
The cover of the game references the couple from American Gothic by Grant Wood under Martian attack.

== Reception ==
William A. Barton reviewed They've Invaded Pleasantville in The Space Gamer No. 42. Barton commented that "Unless you shudder every time you remember those old late-show sci-fi flicks or you tend to shun anything less complex than Freedom in the Galaxy, you should find They've Invaded Pleasantville an amusing little diversion."

Duke Ritenhouse commented in a 1998 article that "The big red dragon from Lake Geneva even got into the act by 1981, taking time out from counting its Advanced Dungeons & Dragons profits to release a series of minis that came in ridiculous unwieldy, clear plastic cases. Anyone remember They've invaded Pleasantville? Revolt on Antares? Vampyre? For that matter, does anyone remember Remember the Alamo?"

Greg Borenstein in his 2015 master's thesis "The Future of Tabletop Games" noted that "The process of using these lookup tables (and the many others littered throughout They’ve Invaded Pleasantville’s manual) is painstaking and slow. However, their presence gives attentive players an opportunity to fully understand the rules of the simulations driving the game as they are literally laid out for players to read."
