= Shuttlewars =

Board game

Shuttlewars is a 1981 board game published by Paranoia Press.

== Gameplay ==
Shuttlewars is a tactical game involving orbital space combat taking place in the 1980s.

== Reception ==
William A. Barton reviewed Shuttlewars in The Space Gamer No. 42. Barton commented that "For the price, you can't beat it."
