= Dimension Demons =

Science fiction board wargame

Cover art by Pat Hidy, 1981

Dimension Demons is a science fiction board wargame published by Metagaming Concepts in 1981 as part of its MicroGame line.

== Description ==
Dimension Demons is a 2-player game that involves conflict between humans and demons who exist in different dimensions. To win, the players must invade each other's dimension.

=== Components ===
The microgame box contains:

- paper hex grid double map
- 84 die-cut counters
- rules booklet
- 6-sided die

== Gameplay ==
One player controls the humans, the other player the demons. The map has two hex grids: one for the demon dimension and the other for the human dimension. When visiting the other's dimension, all units must remain within a certain distance of their transport or be automatically teleported back to their home dimension.

Combat uses the same rules developed for O.G.R.E.: defenders fire first, followed by attackers; the fired-upon unit is either disrupted, eliminated, or there is no result.

Three scenarios are provided.

== Publication history ==
Metagaming Concepts pioneered the concept of microgames. Dimension Demons, published in 1981, was the 17th game in this line, and was designed by Fred Askew, with interior artwork by Trace Hallowell and Pat Hidy and cover art by Hidy.

Hobby Japan published a Japanese language edition in 1988.

== Reception ==
Tony Watson reviewed Dimension Demons in The Space Gamer No. 36. Watson commented that "I can only offer a qualified recommendation for Dimension Demons, mainly based on its unique topic. Experienced gamers, unless interested in the subject matter, might do better with another Micro."

In Issue 33 of Phoenix, R. Jordan thought the components were marginally better than those produced in Metagaming's earlier products. He thought the game was unbalanced in favour of the humans due to the defensive and offensive capabilities of their tanks. He didn't think any of the included scenarios were very good, but thought it would be easy to design a better one. While Jordan didn't think this game was a timeless classic, he found it "quite an agreeable surprise." He concluded, "Not very taxing mentally, and short and simple; I would think this very suitable for younger or new Gamers."

In Issue 27 of Simulacrum, Brian Train noted, "In a straight up fight with humans, especially the human tank, the aliens are wimpy. It's unbalanced and thoroughly undeveloped, showing signs of a rush-to-market mentality. There's some good ideas here, but they are too buried in the slipshod 'everything else' of the game to shine through."

In a retrospective review in Issue 35 of Warning Order, Matt Irsik commented that the game was "a novel concept let down by below average graphics and game play that was less than inspiring. The two worlds portrayed on a single map was clever, but getting the aliens to win was pretty tough. This was becoming a consistent theme [in Metagming's microgames] where it appeared as if the games had to be scaled back to fit the series format and lost something in the transition."
