= The Generic Gangster Chase Game =

Board game

The Generic Gangster Chase Game is a 1981 board game published by Generic Games.

== Gameplay ==
The Generic Gangster Chase Game is a game in which the mob hitman Big Jim pursues top reporter Ace Wilson.

== Reception ==
W. G. Armintrout reviewed The Generic Gangster Chase Game in The Space Gamer No. 45. Armintrout commented that "The Generic Gangster Chase Game is a pleasant way to spend half an hour. I would not suggest it as a substitute for Imperium, but it is acceptable for beer-and-pretzels play."
