= G.E.V. (board game) =

Board wargame published in 1977

- Original "plastic bag" edition published by Metagaming Concepts, 1977
- Publishers: Metagaming Concepts
- Publication: 1978
- Genres: Board wargame

G.E.V. ("Ground Effect Vehicle") is a science fiction board wargame that simulates combat in the near future between armored hovercraft, supertanks and other futuristic weaponry.

The game was designed by American game designer Steve Jackson as a sequel to his Ogre board game when he was working for Metagaming Concepts. When Jackson left Metagaming to form his own company, he took the rights to both G.E.V. and Ogre with him, and all subsequent editions have been produced by Steve Jackson Games.

== Description ==
G.E.V. is a two-player wargame set in the late 21st century that features GEVs as well as Ogres (large intelligent tanks), conventional tanks, infantry, and artillery. It developed as a sequel to Ogre, which had already featured GEVs as a secondary vehicle. GEVs were lightly armed hovercraft that moved more quickly than the huge, lumbering Ogres. The new game expanded the GEV gameplay and gave scenarios fitted to a high-speed vehicle. A feature of the GEV gameplay was that the original move-fire turn sequence of typical combat games became a move-fire-move sequence, with GEVs allowed a second movement phase. This could be used for either hit-and-run attacks with a retreat phase out of range, or a charge emphasizing a high-speed advance, even without time to adequately defend.

=== Components ===
The game components of the original 1977 edition published by Metagames Concepts are:

- a 12 in × 14 in (300 mm × 360 mm) map, printed on glossy paper
- 135 counters representing military units and machines
- a 22-page rulebook

=== Scenarios ===
Four scenarios are included with the game. All have a basic version for beginning players, an advanced version, and an Ogre version:

- Breakthrough: GEVs must try to break through a strong defended point
- Raid: The sequel to "Breakthrough", as GEVs try to cause as much damage as possible before reinforcements can arrive.
- The Train: GEVs attack a supply train
- Ceasefire Collapse: Both sides races across a DMZ to capture as much land as possible.

=== Movement ===
Each piece has a movement factor which indicates the number of hexes it can move each turn, although certain types of terrain can penalize this. Most units are restricted to "move & shoot" phases each turn (move phase first, then combat phase).

=== Combat ===
Attacks are resolved by comparing the attacking unit's strength to the defending unit's defense strength. Rules are also provided for overrun combat, spillover fire, and cover.

=== Victory conditions ===
Each scenario uses a points-based victory condition system.

== Publication history ==
In 1977, Metagaming Concepts published Ogre and pioneered the microgame, a small, cheap and simple solitaire or two-player game, often with a science fiction or fantasy theme. Ogre was created by Steve Jackson, who then designed a sequel, G.E.V., which was published by Metagaming as their 6th MicroGame in 1977.

When Jackson left Metagaming in 1982 over a dispute about some of his other games to found Steve Jackson Games (SJG), he took the rights to Ogre and G.E.V. with him, and immediately published new editions of both games. He followed this with a number of popular sequels, including Shockwave, Ogre Reinforcement Pack, and Ogre Battlefields.

In 1990, Ogre was combined with G.E.V. as Ogre/G.E.V., a single 5 3/8" x 8 1/2" box. The rules were combined into a single 4 in × 7 in (100 mm × 180 mm) two-way booklet, with the rules for one game printed in one direction; the booklet was flipped over to see the other rules.

== Reception ==
In the inaugural issue of Ares (March 1980), David Ritchie commented that "GEV is not as clean as Ogre, but probably has more replay value. There are some imaginative scenarios, including one involving an armored train." Ritchie concluded by giving the game a very good rating of 8 out of 9, saying, "Possibly the best single micro game."

In Issue 30 of Phoenix, (March–April 1981), Michael Stoner thought it was a very quick-moving game, noting that in most scenarios, one player gains the upper hand within ten minutes of play. He concluded, "It is not as much of a 'fun' game as Ogre but is, rather, a realistic (and quite complex) game that tests your skill to the limit."

In the 1980 book The Complete Book of Wargames, game designer Jon Freeman thought that "GEV suffers from the problem of all sequels: it's hard to live up to the reputation created by the original. Since Ogre is one of the most remarkably successful games ever, GEV has a hard act to follow. It can be perhaps forgiven its small failures. As a game in its own right, it’s somewhat dull. Though the situation is hypothetical, the feel is exceptionally conventional. The battles could be lifted whole from [ Avalon Hill's wargame] PanzerBlitz. Only when Ogres are added and the situation is reduced to the uncomplicated objectives of the earlier game does it come to life." Freeman concluded by give the game an Overall Evaluation of "Good", saying, "It's a good expansion kit, but only a fair game. If you have Ogre and like it, you'll want this. If not, get Ogre first."

Al Berke reviewed Deluxe G.E.V. for The Wargamer and wrote: "Make no mistake, Deluxe G.E.V. is a starter kit and should not be viewed as a complete game. I think it is a niche product for gamers familiar with the OGRE/G.E.V. series who are interested in taking the step up to miniatures."

In Issue 27 of Simulacrum, Brian Train noted, "Probably the high point of microgames. Small, fast and has a reasonable punch, just like the titular units."

== Reviews ==
- Galileo
