= The Trojan War (board game) =

1981 board game

The Trojan War is a 1981 board game published by Metagaming Concepts.

== Gameplay ==
The Trojan War is a game involving battle on the walls of Troy and around its walls during the eleven year Siege of Troy.

== Publication history ==
Glenn Rahman designed The Trojan War, which was published by Metagaming in 1981.

== Reception ==
Paul O'Connor reviewed The Trojan War in The Space Gamer No. 45. O'Connor commented that "While lacking a bit in color, The Trojan War still provides a reasonably accurate, playable simulation of the battles outside the walls of Troy. If the period interests you, you might want to look this one up. Otherwise, leave The Trojan War on the shelf."
