= MicroGame =

The MicroGame line by Metagaming Concepts consisted of tabletop microgames published from 1977 to 1982.

== History ==
In 1977, Metagaming Concepts designer Howard Thompson came up with a new type of small, inexpensive, and fast wargame with a limited number of counters, a small map and a short rulebook, each packaged in a plastic zipper storage bag. The games at first sold for $2.95, much cheaper than standard-sized boxed wargames of the time. As game historian Shannon Appelcline noted in the 2014 book Designers & Dragons, "The games were quite cheap for the market at the time but nonetheless allowed for a good amount of enjoyment and replayability."

Metagaming Concepts first used the term "MicroGame" when they released Ogre, MicroGame #1 in 1977.

== Games ==
- 1: Ogre
- 2: Chitin: I
- 3: Melee
- 4: WarpWar
- 5: Rivets
- 6: Wizard
- 7: Olympica
- 8: G.E.V.
- 9: Ice War
- 10: Black Hole
- 11: Sticks & Stones
- 12: Invasion of the Air-eaters
- 13: Holy War
- 14: Annihilator & One World
- 15: Hot Spot
- 16: Artifact
- 17: Dimension Demons
- 18: The Lords of Underearth
- 19: Helltank
- 20: Trailblazer
- 21: Starleader: Assault!
- 22: Helltank Destroyer
