= Metagaming Concepts =

Board game publisher

- Company type: Privately held company
- Industry: Game publisher
- Founded: 1974
- Founder: Howard Thompson
- Headquarters: United States

Metagaming Concepts, later known simply as Metagaming, was a company that published board games from 1974 to 1983. It was founded and owned by Howard Thompson, who designed the company's first game, Stellar Conquest. The company also invented Microgames and published Steve Jackson's first designs, including Ogre, G.E.V. and The Fantasy Trip.

== History ==
The company's first product, released in 1974, was Stellar Conquest, which had been rejected by Avalon Hill in 1973. (Note: Thompson, Howard (June 1978). Preface to the rule book in the third printing of Stellar Conquest.) Many of Metagaming's notable titles were also science fiction wargames, including Ogre, G.E.V., and WarpWar.

In 1975, Metagaming started The Space Gamer as a quarterly house magazine. By its 17th issue, TSG was a full size bimonthly magazine, printed on slick paper and covering games from other publishers, including fantasy games.

Thompson and Metagaming pioneered the idea of publishing small, low-cost games in what came to be known as the MicroGame format. For a while, Metagaming dominated this niche wargaming market. Notable MicroGames from Metagaming include WarpWar (designed by Thompson himself), Ogre, G.E.V., Melee, Wizard (all designed by Steve Jackson), and Hitler's War.

Following the success of Dungeons & Dragons, Thompson had Steve Jackson design Melee (1977) and Wizard (1978) as the combat and magic systems for a fantasy role-playing game named The Fantasy Trip. TFT was released in 1980 as three books: In the Labyrinth: Game Masters' Campaign and Adventure Guide, Advanced Melee, and Advanced Wizard. Thompson was unhappy with Jackson's work on TFT, which presumably contributed to Jackson's departure from Metagaming later in 1980. Jackson bought The Space Gamer when he left; after a legal dispute, Metagaming conceded that they had also sold Ogre, G.E.V. and an unreleased MicroGame called One-Page Bulge to Jackson.

In the early 1980s, Metagaming published a series of modules for TFT in MicroGame format, as well as other MicroGames, some with historical themes, including Hitler's War. The company launched another magazine, Interplay, which was a house organ intended to be published six times a year. It ran for eight issues before the company disbanded. The first issue of Interplay was dated May/June 1981, and the eighth was dated September/October 1982.

In 1981, the company published A Fistful of Turkeys, which is a game that simulates the struggle between turkeys and a deranged turkey hunter, Billy Jackal. Tom Gordon reviewed A Fistful of Turkeys in The Space Gamer No. 41. Gordon commented that "All in all I feel that this game is not even fit for a beer and pretzel game. It possesses nothing unique or worth [the price]. It is, however, a real 'turkey' game." "Sahm Reviews" thought that the touches of parody were more interesting than the game:

a bogus author introduction, an angry letter from a customer, a fictional game list, silly versions of major game company logos, and the manner in which "Some Turkey Games" is printed at the bottom of the cover (copying the style used on the early [Steve Jackson Games] games).

On January 1, 1982, Thompson created Games Research Group, Inc., a spin-off from Metagaming.

The Games Research Group, Inc. copyright appears on several Metagaming-released products, such as the counters of the MicroGame Dragons of the Underearth.

Thompson closed down Metagaming in April 1983 and disappeared from the gaming hobby, leaving most of Metagaming's intellectual property in limbo.

On December 26, 2017, Steve Jackson announced that he had re-acquired the rights for the remaining products he authored for Metagaming, specifically Melee, Wizard, Death Test, Death Test 2, Advanced Melee, Advanced Wizard, In the Labyrinth, and Tollenkar's Lair. This was accomplished through the provisions of 17 U.S. Code § 203, which allows authors to reclaim works after 35 years.

== Microgames series ==
1. OGRE (1977)
2. Chitin: I (1977)
3. Melee (1977)
4. WarpWar (1977)
5. Rivets (1977)
6. Wizard (1978)
7. Olympica (1978)
8. G.E.V. (1978)
9. Ice War (1978)
10. Black Hole (1978)
11. Sticks and Stones (1978)
12. Invasion of the Air-eaters (1979)
13. Holy War (1979)
14. Annihilator & One World (1979)
15. Hot Spot (1979)
16. Artifact (1980)
17. Dimension Demons (1981)
18. The Lords of Underearth (1981)
19. Helltank (1981)
20. Trailblazer (1981)
21. Starleader: Assault! (1982)
22. Helltank Destroyer (1982)

== MicroQuest series ==
1. Death Test (1978)
2. Death Test 2 (1980)
3. Grail Quest (1980)
4. Treasure of the Silver Dragon (1980)
5. Security Station (1980)
6. Treasure of Unicorn Gold (1981)
7. Master of the Amulets (1981)

== Personnel ==
Notable game designers who worked for Metagaming include Jackson, Lynn Willis and Keith Gross. Ben Ostrander, who was later the publisher of Mojo Press, served as the art director for most of the company's titles.
