= Ares (magazine) =

Science fiction wargame magazine

- Cover of Issue #1 (March 1980), cover art by Howard Chaykin
- Frequency: Quarterly
- Publisher: Simulations Publications
- First issue: 1980
- Final issue: 1984
- Country: United States
- Language: English

Ares was an American science fiction and fantasy wargame magazine published by Simulations Publications, Inc. (SPI), and then TSR, Inc., between 1980 and 1984. In addition to the articles, each issue contained a small science-fiction or fantasy themed board wargame.

== Publication history ==
Through the 1970s, SPI had specialized in military history wargames. But the 1977 publication of Metagaming Concepts's science fiction MicroGame titled OGRE proved enormously popular, and other publishers such as Task Force Games, Operational Studies Group, and Chaosium started to develop their own microgames. SPI also started to develop their own line of science fiction microgames, but went a step further, creating a new science-fiction magazine titled Ares in 1980 as a bi-monthly science-fiction/fantasy publication to complement their military wargame magazine Strategy & Tactics.Ares, like Strategy & Tactics, included a free game with every issue, complete with a foldout stiff paper map, a set of die-cut counters, and rules.

SPI published 11 issues of Ares, and had prepared Issue 12 for publication when the company was suddenly and unexpectedly taken over by TSR in 1982. TSR released the ready-for-print Issue 12, but reduced the magazine's frequency from bi-monthly to quarterly. After Issue 17, TSR stopped printing the magazine as a separate entity; instead, starting with Issue 84 of TSR's house magazine Dragon, a section was titled Ares, and provided support for science fantasy and superhero role-playing game such as Gamma World, Marvel Super Heroes and Star Frontiers. This section last from issue #84 (April 1984) to issue #111 (July 1986), and then was discontinued. The section was resurrected from issue #255 (January 1999) to #265 (November 1999) to provide support for the Alternity game. From issue #266 (December 1999), this section was just headed "Alternity" until it was dropped from issue #274 (August 2000), as TSR and the magazine both put all their focus on 3rd edition Dungeons and Dragons.

As game historian Shannon Appelcline noted, "TSR did very little with SPI's roleplaying games. Ares Magazine #12 (1982), which was prepared by SPI and published by TSR, included a game called Star Traders, which was for use with Universe; it was the last support for that game system [...] As TSR turned further away from SPI's origins, Ares magazine soon became an Ares section in Dragon magazine. However, it didn't focus on the SPI RPGs, but instead became a place to talk about TSR's own science-fiction games, such as Gamma World and Star Frontiers."

Michael Anderson of One Small Step Games started a Kickstarter in 2014 to remake the old magazine as a new Ares. The Kickstarter was successful in February 2014. The second issue was released in December 2015. The third issue was released in September 2016. The fourth issue was released in January 2017.

== Reception ==
Jerry Epperson reviewed the first issue of Ares in The Space Gamer No. 28. Epperson commented that the first issue, and its game WorldKiller "was a disappointment. It's uneven. Expect nothing but the best in serious science fiction writing here, and nothing but the worst from the games."

In Issue 26 of Phoenix, Hamish Wilson liked the professional look of the first issue, calling it "well put together." But overall, he felt the magazine "lacks form, shape and direction [...] rather than being bold, uncompromising and nailing its colours to the mast, Ares has, as it were, crept out into the open with some fiction, some fact and some game."

In Fantastic, game designer Greg Costikyan was unimpressed with the first issue of Ares, writing, "One would have thought that SPI would seek to make a good impression by producing a high quality game in the first issue [of Ares]. On the contrary, WorldKiller is a dog [...] The game is simple and uninteresting, with no complications introduced to hold one’s interest."

== Review ==
- Perfidious Albion #46 (May 1980) p.8
- Perfidious Albion #49 (December 1980) p.19
- Perfidious Albion #50 (January 1981) p.19

== See also ==
- Galac-Tac
- Starweb
- Nightmare House
