= Ogre (board game) =

Board game designed by Steve Jackson

OGRE
- Microgame cover (second edition, 1977)
- Publishers: Metagaming Concepts
- Publication: 1977
- Genres: Science fiction board wargame

OGRE is a science fiction board wargame designed by the American game designer Steve Jackson and published by Metagaming Concepts in 1977 as the first microgame in its MicroGame line. When Jackson left Metagaming to form his own company, he took the rights to OGRE with him, and all subsequent editions have been produced by Steve Jackson Games (SJG).

== Game description ==
OGRE is an asymmetrical two-player wargame set in the late 21st century that pits a single giant robot tank called an "OGRE" against the second player's headquarters, defended by a mixture of conventional units, including tanks, infantry, and artillery.

During each player's turn, they may move their unit(s), then engage in combat with the opponent's unit(s) if the movement has brought those unit(s) in range of the weapons on the moved unit(s). After the combat has been resolved by rolling a die for each encounter, the specialized "Ground Effect Vehicle" units may be moved a second time; play then passes to the other player. Victory conditions vary by scenario, but for the OGRE player, the objective generally includes destroying the defender's command post and sometimes also eliminating their forces, and for the defender, the objective is to destroy the OGRE.

=== Components ===
Schematic version of OGRE map, including ridgelines and craters.

The game components of the original 1977 edition published by Metagaming include a 14×9 in (360×230 mm) hex map printed in black-and-white; 112 square counters, each 7/16 in (11 mm) on a side, representing military units and machines, printed on sheets of cardboard (but not fully die-cut); and a 20-page rulebook.

The original hex map depicts a battleground of barren terrain with obstacles including raised ridgelines between some adjacent hex cells and large, radioactive craters occupying a full hex cell. The board is 15 hex cells wide and was reduced from 25 to 22 rows with the second edition. In addition, the second edition updated the map with crater graphics. The 1982 edition published by Steve Jackson Games upgraded the map to color printed on glossy paper and expanded the rulebook to 40 pages, but retained similar semi-die-cut counters.

OGRE counters
Version Counter		v1 & v2		
Version Counter		Gray	Blk	Wht
Command Post		2	—N/a	
OGRE	Mk III	3	3	3
OGRE	Mk V	2	2	2
Howitzer		6	—N/a	
GEV		16	6	—N/a
Heavy Tank (Note: Marked as M2 in the first edition; updated to M3 for the second edition.)		12	4	—N/a
Missile Tank		12	4	—N/a
Infantry	3/1	12	5	—N/a
Infantry	2/1	6	3	—N/a
Infantry	1/1	6	3	—N/a

=== Units ===
In the original game, the player defending against the OGRE may select from four conventional armor units, in addition to Infantry:

- Heavy Tank
- Missile Tank
- GEV (Ground Effect Vehicle)
- Howitzer

Infantry units may be stacked in groups of up to 3 squads, and Infantry counters are provided in corresponding values of 1-, 2-, and 3-squad units. Each conventional unit (including Infantry) carries numerical ratings for attack, defense, and movement, which are marked on the counter corresponding to that unit as follows:

S/R Dx My

where

- S = attack strength
- R = striking distance / range
- Dx = defense strength
- My = movement points

The OGRE carries similar attack, range, and defense ratings for each of its weapon systems, and a single movement point rating for the OGRE vehicle itself. OGRE movement ability is determined by its remaining tread points, with damage to the treads resulting in a proportional reduction to available movement points.

Armor units
Unit	S/R	Dx	My
Heavy Tank	4/2	D3	M3
Missile Tank	3/4	D2	M2
Light Tank	2/2	D2	M3
Superheavy (Note: The Superheavy Tank may be used with a record sheet to determine partial damage.)	6(×2)/3	D5	M3
Howitzer	6/8	D1	M0
Light Artillery Drone (LAD) (Note: May be towed.)	2/8	D1	M0
Mobile Howitzer	6/6	D2	M1
Ground Effect Vehicle (GEV)	2/2	D2	M4+3
Light GEV	1/2	D1	M4+3
GEV Personnel Carrier	1/2	D2	M3+2
Missile Crawler	1 Cruise Missile	D2	M1

Infantry units
Unit	S/R	Dx	My
Infantry	n/1 (Note: Attack strength and defense depend on n, the number of squads in that group. For example, a 3-squad Infantry counter would show 3/1 D3 M2. Similarly, a 2-squad counter would show 2/1 D2 M2, and a 1-squad counter would show 1/1 D1 M2.)	Dn	M2
Marines (Note: Equivalent to land-based units, but movement not affected by water and defense doubled when in water.)	n/1	Dn	M2
Heavy Weapons Team	3/4(×1) (Note: Capable of launching a one-time heavy weapon attack at 3/4 strength and range, otherwise carries the same "native" attack strength and range ratings as a 1-squad infantry: 1/1.) + 1/1	D1	M2
Marine Heavy Weapons Team	3/4(×1) + 1/1	D1	M2
Combat Engineers (Note: Capable of altering the battlefield. Equivalent attack and defense ratings as 2-squad infantry.)	2/1	D2	M2
Marine Combat Engineers	2/1	D2	M2

OGRE statistics
OGRE	Weapons				Tread (Note: The tread determines the number of movement points available to the OGRE, My. For each 1/y× of tread points lost, the number of movement points is reduced by 1. For example, the Mark IV OGRE has 60 tread points and M4 base movement points. When the Mark IV tread points are reduced to 45, having lost 15, which is equal to 1/4× of its original tread points, its movement is reduced to M3, progressively declining to M2 at 30 remaining tread points (30 tread points lost), M1 at 15 tread points (-45), and M0 at 0 tread points (-60).)
OGRE	Main (Note: Given as quantity of main battery weapons. Each main battery has an attack value of 4, a striking distance of 3, and a defense value of D4 (4/3 D4).) 4/3 D4	2ndry (Note: Given as quantity of secondary battery weapons. Each secondary battery has an attack value of 3, a striking distance of 2, and a defense value of D2 or D3, as noted (3/2 D2 or D3).) 3/2 D2 or D3	AP (Note: Given as quantity of anti-personnel weapons. Each anti-personnel has an attack value of 1, a striking distance of 1, and a defense value of D1 (1/1 D1); these are effective only against infantry and other non-mechanized units, including the command post.) 1/1 D1	MSL (Note: Given as quantity of missiles and (×[number of racks]). Each missile has an attack value of 6 and a striking range of 5. Mark III and V OGREs carry all their missiles on the exterior, and each missile may be individually targeted and destroyed before launching; these exterior missiles each have a defense value of D3. For OGREs with missile racks, the number of missiles that can be fired simultaneously is equal to the number of racks remaining, so for example, a "Fencer", which starts with 4 racks, can fire off 4 missiles simultaneously. Each missile rack has a defense value of D4; in these OGREs, missiles are carried inside, and destroying the rack also destroys one missile.) 6/5 D3 or D4	Tread
Mk I	1×	—N/a	—N/a	—N/a	15(M3)
Mk II	1×	2×D2	6×	—N/a	30(M3)
Mk III	1×	4×D3	8×	2(×0)	45(M3)
"Fencer"	—N/a	4×D3	8×	20(×4)	45(M3)
Mk IV	1×	2×D3	8×	15(×3)	60(M4)
"Ninja"	1×	2×D3	8×	6(×1)	40(M4)
Mk V	2×	6×D3	12×	6(×0)	60(M3)
Mk VI	3×	6×D3	16×	20(×2)	75(M3)

=== Setup ===
The defender sets up their forces in the more congested northern part of the map; the OGRE controlled by the other player enters the opposite side of the map at the beginning of the game. The map is divided into Northern (rows 7 and lower), Central (rows 8 through 15), and Southern (rows 16 and higher) regions; the defender is required to place their units in the Northern and Central areas, with restrictions on the initial total strength in the Central area, and the OGRE starts from the Southern edge of the map (row 21 or 22).

Several scenarios are provided with the game. Since its initial release, additional scenarios have been described in expansion sets and gaming magazines. The basic version of the game has the attacker using a single OGRE heavy tank (referred to as a "Mark III OGRE"), while the advanced scenario gives the attacker the larger, more powerful "Mark V OGRE" tank versus an increased number of defenders. In either scenario, the defender is given a budget to select several infantry, based on total attack power, and a total number of 'armor units', but the defender is free to choose the exact composition of their own forces, staying within the budget. For example, the defender in the standard (Mark III) scenario is allowed to select any combination of infantry which total 20 attack points, and 12 armor units, counted as one per unit (e.g., one heavy tank is counted as one armor unit) except Howitzers, which count as two units each.

=== Movement ===
Each piece has a movement factor which indicates the number of hexes it can move each turn, although certain types of terrain can penalize this. While craters are impassable for all units, infantry and OGREs may cross ridgelines. Maps from later editions of the game have additional features and obstacles that also affect movement.

Most units are restricted to a single move & shoot phase during each turn (move phase first, then combat phase). There are two notable exceptions: GEVs ("ground effect vehicles", which are heavily armored hovercraft) can move both before and after combat, and the OGRE can ram into an enemy unit during its movement phase, possibly destroying the defender.

=== Combat ===
Combat Results Table
Ratio (A:D) (Note: Ratios are rounded down in favor of the defender. For example, if a weapon with strength 3 is attacking a target with a defense of D2, the ratio 3:2 is rounded down to 1:1 in favor of the defender.) Roll	1:2 (Note: Ratios of 1:3 and less are always determined NO EFFECT (NE) regardless of the roll, in favor of the defender.)	1:1	2:1	3:1	4:1 (Note: Ratios of 5:1 and greater are always determined DESTROYED (X) regardless of the roll, in favor of the attacker.)
1	NE	NE	NE	D	D
2	NE	NE	D	D	X
3	NE	D	D	X	X
4	NE	D	X	X	X
5	D	X	X	X	X
6	X	X	X	X	X

Attacks are resolved by comparing the attacking unit's strength to the defending unit's defense strength and rolling a standard (six-sided) die. The attacker must designate a target. All units attacking the same target can combine their attack factors. Likewise, the player of the OGRE can combine the attack factors of its different weapon systems if aimed at the same target. When defending, adjacent or stacked units are considered separate targets and cannot combine their defense factors. In the OGRE, each system is considered a separate target.

The ratio of attack to defense factors are rounded in favor of the defender, and then is looked up in a combat results table with the die roll. For infantry and armor units, there are three possible outcomes: no effect (NE), disabled (D: armor units lose their next turn, and infantry units are decremented by one squad), or destroyed (X). When attacking OGRE weapon systems, there are only two outcomes: no effect or destroyed; the disabled result is considered the same as no effect for OGRE systems.

=== Strategy ===
The different types of units available to the defender encourage a combined-arms approach with each type being better than the others in different aspects. Heavy tanks have high attack and defense with moderate speed and low range. Missile tanks have moderate attack and defense with moderate range and low speed. GEVs have very high speed (moving twice per turn), low attack, low range, and moderate defense. Howitzers have very high attack and range but are easily destroyed (once an attacker has managed to get close enough), immobile, and expensive. However, according to the game's designer, this balanced mix of units was not quite right in the first edition; the second edition sped up heavy tanks, slowed down GEVs, and changed the defender's purchasing from "attack factors" to "armor units" (everything is considered equivalent, except howitzers, which are worth two of anything else).

== Publication history ==
Ogre Mk.III and Mk.III-B miniatures, on the 'crater map' from the OGRE Deluxe set

In 1960, science fiction author Keith Laumer wrote Combat Unit, the first of many short stories and novellas about large, semi-intelligent tanks called "Bolos". These stories and Colin Kapp's short story "Gottlos" (1969) were major influences in the development of OGRE.

OGRE was designed by American game designer Steve Jackson and published by Metagaming Concepts in 1977 featuring artwork by Winchell Chung. Jackson said his concept arose from the limitations of the "Microgame" format: "Thinking about writing a scenario using maybe 30 counters and just a few hexes, it hit me: give one side one counter. One big counter. After that, it started to fall into place." The game proved popular, and Metagaming quickly released a second edition later the same year, aimed at improving the game's balance, with a much larger print run and rulebook artwork by Clark Bradley rather than Chung.

=== Steve Jackson Games ===
When Steve Jackson left Metagaming to found Steve Jackson Games (SJG), he took the rights to OGRE with him and published a new (third) edition in 1982. This third edition featured double-sided counters and reused the Bradley artwork from the second edition; unlike the Metagaming MicroGames, which were housed in a plastic zipper storage bag, the third edition came in a "Pocket Box" clamshell. The board now used a color sheet with artwork by Denis Loubet.

In 1987, SJG released OGRE: Deluxe Edition. The rulebook cover artwork was the Denis Loubet illustration that was also used for the OGRE computer game (see Spinoffs below). The board was printed on a folding cardboard base, sturdier than the previous edition's paper map, and the counters were provided with stand-up plastic bases. Games magazine listed the Deluxe Edition as one of its best games of the year.

In 1990, OGRE was combined with its sequel G.E.V. in a single OGRE/G.E.V. box. The OGRE rules were designated as the 4th edition and the G.E.V. rules were designated as the 3rd edition. The combined OGRE/G.E.V. game was released using a single 5 3/8×8 1/2 in (140×220 mm) box, and the rules were combined into a single 4×7 in (100×180 mm) two-way booklet, with the rule for one game printed in one direction; the booklet was flipped over to see the other rules. The box for the combined OGRE/G.E.V. was redesigned and the game received a limited re-release in 1995. In 2000, OGRE/G.E.V. was released again and designated as the 5th edition, with new cover art by Phillip Reed, sold in a VHS box, but rules still in a 4" x 7", 44-page booklet and counters in black, red and white (2-sided).

In 2011 Steve Jackson announced a sixth edition, The OGRE Designer's Edition, combining OGRE and G.E.V. with larger full-color flat counters for most units and constructible cardboard figures for the Ogres. In May 2012, the new "Designer's Edition" was funded on Kickstarter, and the game was produced in 2013, with a cover illustrated by Philip Reed, containing five folding map boards, more than 500 counters, and 72 constructible 3-D OGREs and buildings. Numerous accessories were released at the same time, providing additional counters and scenarios. A new "Pocket Edition" of OGRE also was released in 2013, packaged in a resealable plastic bag, similar to the original (1977) MicroGames, and with a rulebook bearing the original artwork from Winchell Chung. The new Pocket Edition uses the original unit types with a version of the sixth edition rules modified to suit. A separate Sixth Edition boxed boardgame was released in December 2016, providing the updated rules and units from the Designer's Edition at a more affordable price.

In 2020, SJG released an updated pocket box version of OGRE with a 16-page manual and 112 counters, along with updated pocket box versions of G.E.V., Battlesuit, and Shockwave. In 2021, as part of a Kickstarter campaign, SJG released the 1976 OGRE Playtest Booklet, a reproduction of the original typewritten rules and hand-drawn counters and map that were used during playtesting the first version of OGRE.

=== Other in-universe boardgames ===
Steve Jackson created a sequel, G.E.V. (1978), which is compatible with OGRE and adds terrain effects on movement, new units, and rules for stacking units on a single hex cell. After leaving Metagaming to form Steve Jackson Games, Jackson also designed and published Battlesuit (1983), which is set in the same fictional universe as OGRE and G.E.V., but concentrates on person-to-person battles instead and is not compatible with the earlier games.

Ogre Miniatures is a book first published in 1992 with a cover illustrated by Jeff Mangiat; this included the rules for both OGRE and G.E.V. and revised them to use miniatures instead of counters, by changing weapon ranges from hex cells to physical measurements in inches and describing a rescaled map to suit miniatures. A "new" Deluxe OGRE (2000) was a re-issue of OGRE Miniatures, bundled with miniatures, and the original "crater" map was re-printed on a larger scale.

=== Expansions ===
There have been three major expansions to OGRE, each adding new units and rules, since its initial release: Shockwave (1984), Reinforcement Pack (1985), and Battlefields (2000).

Steve Jackson promised an expansion to OGRE and G.E.V. for Origins '83; the first expansion, Shockwave, was released in 1984, packaged in a familiar plastic zipper bag. Shockwave added many new units and buildings, including corresponding counters, and came with a map designed to be placed adjacent to any side of the map included in G.E.V., expanding the playing surface. The next expansion was the Ogre Reinforcement Pack, released in 1985, which mainly included replacements for lost counters and maps from the prior releases of OGRE, G.E.V., and Shockwave, but also included a few new rules for towing. In 1987, the magazine Space Gamer published a rule expansion, allowing players to design an OGRE.

Steve Jackson announced he was developing the Ogre Battlefields expansion in February 2000, and released it in January 2001; Battlefields includes new maps and specialized Militia and Engineer Infantry units. In late 2018, SJG ran a Kickstarter for a new OGRE Battlefields, an update and expansion for both the Designer's Edition and the Sixth Edition.

== Reception ==
In the April–June 1977 edition The Space Gamer (Issue No. 11), Robert C. Kirk concluded that the 1977 edition of "OGRE is attractive, easy to learn, inexpensive, and fun to play. What more can a gamer ask?" In the next edition of The Space Gamer, William A. Peterson commented that "It is fast, simple, and fun. Its bad points, while annoying, can be ignored."

In Issue 11 of Dragon, Tony Watson wrote, "The nice thing about OGRE is that after you've played a game there's usually time for one more. Thus, you can rectify perceived flaws in your defense or experiment with a new mix or set-up immediately, while the new ideas are still fresh in your mind. Such experimentation is always interesting, and certainly the best way to learn good play." Seven issues later, Jerry Eperson called OGRE "one of those games that get their hook into you the minute you play them [...] But hidden in the game are small subtleties that can only be found after playing OGRE several times."

In the August–September 1977 edition of White Dwarf (Issue 2), Martin Easterbrook began his review of Metagaming Concepts' original 1977 edition by saying "Be warned: this game could become a craze" adding that "the idea of the microgames themselves is remarkable enough in itself". He gave the game an above-average rating of 8 out of 10 but criticized the game's title and "flimsy equipment, weak infantry".

In Issue 32 of the British wargaming magazine Perfidious Albion, Charles Vasey and Nicky Palmer traded views on the game. Palmer was not a fan, calling it a "badly produced fiddlesticks of a game [featuring] a virtually featureless black & white mapboard the size of a pocket book, all hits to be recorded on scrap paper, units requiring scissors to cut them off strips, stacks of finger-nail thin paper card." Vasey replied, "The age of the disposal game is with us, like it or not ... The microgames are CHEAP, they are intended to be ... I rather think that given the present crowded market, had Metagaming not taken the decision to produce as they did, they might well have never risked it at all, and the hobby would have been the poorer."

In the inaugural edition of Ares (March 1980), David Ritchie gave the game a "very good" rating of 7 out of 9, commenting, "The first of the MicroGames, OGRE started an avalanche of small, fast, playable games [...] A Panzer freak's ultimate dream."

In the 1980 book The Complete Book of Wargames, game designer Jon Freeman commented, "It is ridiculously inexpensive — almost disposable. Despite its size and price, it is well produced and reasonably presented." Freeman thought its best value, though, was in its gameplay: "Most significantly, it's an exceptionally fast and interesting game." He noted the game's drawbacks were minor and gave this game an Overall Evaluation of "Excellent", concluding, "It's one of the best values in gaming."

In the October 1980 issue of Fantastic, game designer Greg Costikyan wrote, "OGRE's success, I think, is largely due to its successful mating of two of gaming's most popular subjects — science fiction and the tank. This should not be taken as belittling the game, however, because OGRE is tense, fast-playing and a close match right down to the last die-roll. One of the comments frequently heard when it first came out was an expression of surprise that the game was of such high quality despite its small size and low cost; a lot of 'bang for your buck'."

In Issue 30 of Phoenix (March–April 1981), Michael Stoner thought the counters of the original Metagaming Concepts edition were flimsy and sometimes difficult to read, but otherwise called OGRE "an excellent 'fun' game, taking less than an hour to play and easy to teach."

In the August 1982 edition of Dragon (Issue 64), Tony Watson reviewed the first reissue by Steve Jackson Games, and called OGRE "a legend in the ranks of SF gamedom, and deservedly so... as well as being a lot of fun to play, it's an interesting extrapolation on high-tech armored warfare". Watson noted that the rules had remained essentially the same in the new edition, the most significant changes being to the physical design—with larger (still black and white) counters, and full-color maps by Denis Loubet. Watson also welcomed the retention of the original artwork alongside new pieces — "no one draws a GEV or OGRE like Mr. Chung". He concluded with a strong recommendation, saying it "would make a fine addition to any gamer's collection."

Stewart Wieck reviewed Ogre: Deluxe Edition in White Wolf #9 (1988), rating it a 9 out of 10 and stated that "Easy to learn and quick to play (less than an hour per game on the average), OGRE comes well recommended by many (including myself)."

In the April 1989 edition of G.M. (Vol. 1, Issue 8), Johnny Razor reviewed OGRE: Deluxe Edition and highlighted the game's ease of introduction and short playing time, but pointed out that most gamers either like the game or loathe it.

In the August 1991 edition of Dragon (Issue 172), Allen Varney reviewed the combined OGRE/G.E.V. edition of 1991, and stated, "[The] two simulation board games of armored combat on a future battlefield are among the best the field has ever seen: fast, elegant, and endlessly replayable". While praising the production values of the 2-color playing pieces, Varney found the box somewhat 'flimsy'. He concluded, "These twin classics shouldn't be missed."

Jim Zabek reviewed Deluxe OGRE (2000) for The Wargamer and wrote: "The finished quality of the miniatures notwithstanding, it is a great game and is simply too much fun not to play."

OGRE was chosen for inclusion in the 2007 book Hobby Games: The 100 Best. Game designer Erick Wujcik commented " I think [OGRE's] success really boils down to four essentials: OGRE is fast, ... asymmetrical, ... open-ended, ... [and] is a teaching tool. OGRE had restructured my mind pretty completely ... but it wasn't until 2002 ... that I realized how effective OGRE is at getting across so many important component mechanisms of play and design [...] Gameplay summons to mind a futuristic nightmare of desperation and exhilaration, where rumbling machines unleash barrage after barrage of titanic weaponry and the inexorable advance of a soulless giant can only be stopped by zinging swarms of self-sacrificing martyrs."

In a retrospective review of Ogre in Black Gate, John ONeill said "When you sat down to play a game of Ogre, you weren't just pushing cheap cardboard counters across a piece of paper, and rolling a d6 you stole from your sister's Clue game. You were a participant in a mini theater of the imagination. The stakes were perilously high for your human defenders as they valiantly surged across the blasted landscape towards an unstoppable enemy of mankind, and almost certain death. Every game brought surprises, and the kind of high drama and excitement that kept you and your friends talking for days — or at least until the next time the board came out."

== Spin-offs ==
=== Video games ===
The video game Ogre was published in 1986 by Origin Systems for Apple II, Amiga, Atari 8-bit computers, Atari ST, Commodore 64, IBM PC compatibles, and Mac.

A modern version of the game was released for Windows in 2017, with "Console Edition" versions for PlayStation 4, Nintendo Switch, and Xbox One following in 2022, developed and published by Auroch Digital. It received mixed reviews according to Metacritic.

=== Board games ===
Other board games based on OGRE include:

- Diceland: OGRE, a paper dice game by Cheapass Games.
- Shockwave, an expansion that introduced new unit types including cruise missiles and a map that could be used with the G.E.V. map.

=== Miniatures and miniatures wargaming ===
Martian Metals produced the first set of OGRE miniatures under license from Metagaming Concepts in 1979.

OGRE Miniatures, an adaptation of the game to miniature wargaming using 1:285 scale miniatures, was produced by SJG in 1991.

A set of OGRE miniatures was also developed by Ral Partha.

=== Role-playing games ===
GURPS OGRE (2000) is a supplement using the rules system from the universal role-playing game GURPS.

=== Books ===
The OGRE Book (1982) is a collection of articles and rules variants from The Space Gamer. It was reissued in 2001, and expanded from 40 pages to 128 with further retrospective from Steve Jackson.

== Awards ==
At the 1979 Origins Awards, OGRE miniatures produced by Martian Metals won the H.G. Wells Award for "Best Vehicular Model Series of 1978".

At the 1992 Origins Award, two OGRE-related products won awards:

- OGRE Miniatures, produced by SJG, was awarded Best Miniatures Rules of 1991.
- A set of OGRE miniatures developed by Ral Partha won Best Vehicular Miniatures Series of 1991.

In 1996, Computer Gaming World named the 1986 video game OGRE produced by Origin Systems the 130th-best computer game ever released.

In 2001, 34 years after OGRE's original publication, The Wargamer presented Steve Jackson Games with a special Award for Excellence for the "OGRE/G.E.V. game system and Steve Jackson Games' efforts to expand and support it."

== Other reviews and commentary ==
- Different Worlds No. 9 (Aug–Sept 1980)
- Isaac Asimov's Science Fiction Magazine
- The Last Province No. 2 (Dec 1992)
- Games & Puzzles #69, 81
- Galileo
- Analog Science Fiction and Fact
- Abyss #13
