= Microgame (board games) =

Type of tabletop game

A microgame is a board game or wargame packaged in a small set.

== Description ==
Microgames enjoyed popularity during the 1980s and have seen a revival with the popularity of tabletop games in the 21st century. The term generally refers to board games or wargames which were packaged and sold with instructions and maps or playing surfaces printed in a booklet format, or as one large sheet folded until it became "pocket sized" (approximately 4×7 inches). Game pieces (also known as chits or counters) were printed on one or more sheets of thick paper which the player sometimes had to cut for themselves. Other microgames had fully die-cut cardboard sheets like those included with most board wargames. Steve Jackson Games used the Pocket Box to package many of their games in this format.

While small scale wargames and board games, including Tabletop Games' Micro Series Games, had existed before they began publishing, Metagaming Concepts first used the term "MicroGame" when they released Ogre, MicroGame #1 in 1977.

== Publishers ==
Some publishers of microgames include:

- Alderac Entertainment Group, publishers of Love Letter
- Cheapass Games
- Game Designers' Workshop (defunct)
- Metagaming Concepts (defunct)
- Operational Studies Group
- Simulations Publications, Inc. (defunct)
- Steve Jackson Games
- Task Force Games (defunct)
- Tri Tac Games
- TSR, Inc. (defunct)

== Nanogames ==
Nanogames are smaller than microgames and often consist of nine or fewer cards, with a few other components. While there is no firm definition of a nanogame, several games have been so labeled. Coin Age, a one-card game, and Where Are Thou, Romeo, a five-card game created as an add-on to the 13-card game Council of Verona, are examples of nanogames launched using Kickstarter.

The 9-card nanogame Orchard won the 2018 Board Game Geek's Print and Play Design Contest.
