= Figure painting (hobby) =

Aspect of culture

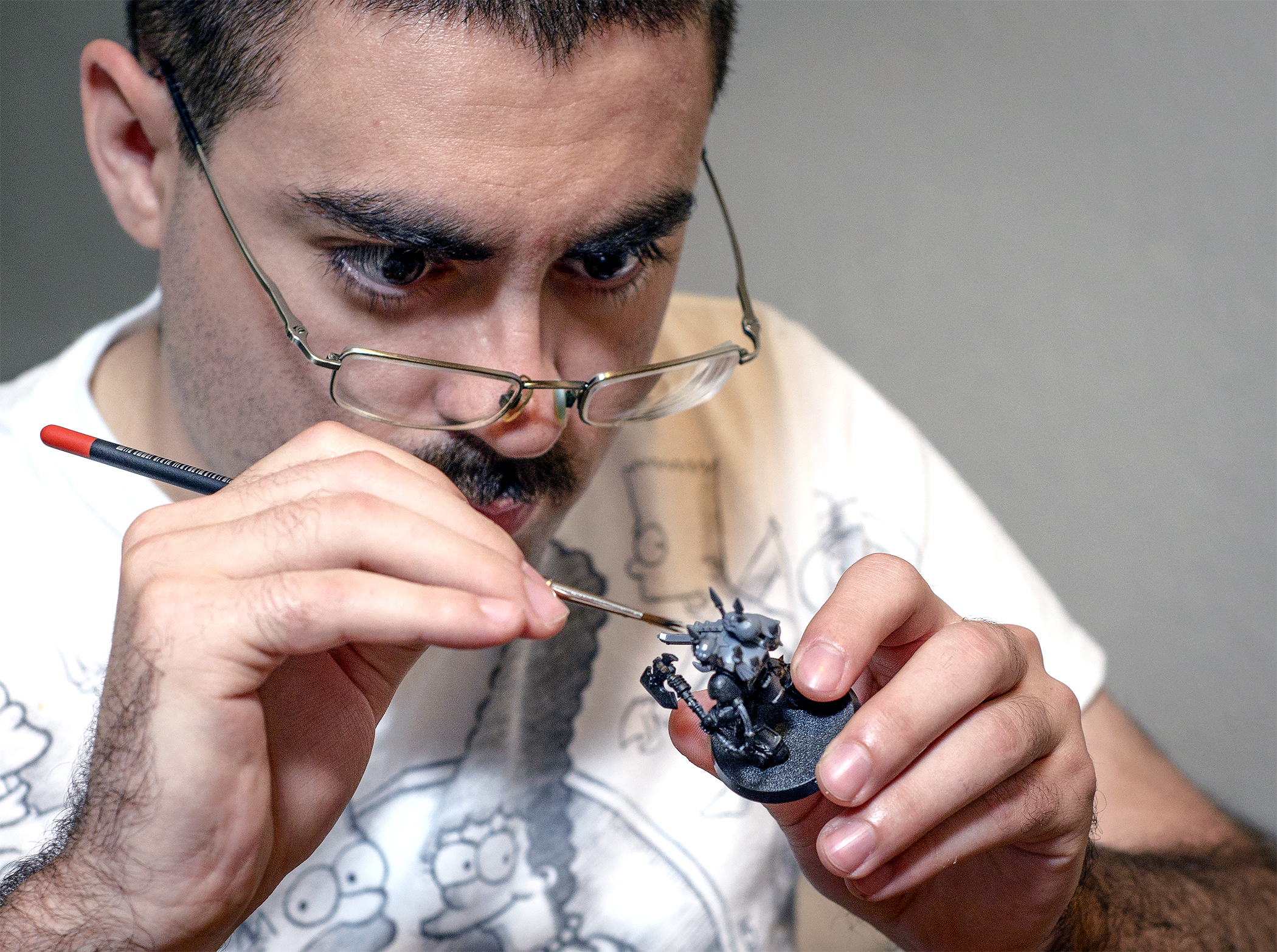
The assembly and painting of models is a major aspect of the hobby of miniature wargaming.

Figure painting, or miniature painting, is the hobby of painting miniature figures and/or model figures, either as a standalone activity or as a part of another activity that uses models, such as role-playing games, wargames, or military modeling.

In addition to the painting of models, the creation of scenic basing for the model to be affixed to is also an important part of the hobby (although not all figure painters are concerned about the basing of their models). These can range from very simple applications of textured pastes, grit, and static grass for gaming bases, to larger scenic bases for display models, and even full dioramas depicting a scene of a single model or a group of models together in tableau to create a story in one moment. It can also include aspects of sculpting, for the purpose of creating additional details for models and bases, as a means of customizing the model to make them more unique, or to create entirely scratch built models for painting. Many figure painters also paint scale busts as part of the hobby, often in bigger scales than figures with a higher level of detail, and display bases and backdrops for them.

As figure painting has grown in size and popularity as a hobby independent of miniature gaming the techniques and methods involved have been developed to advanced standards. Many online forums and online galleries have been created as places for figure painters to share their display and competition pieces for others to view and vote on, such as CoolMiniOrNot and Putty & Paint, as well as figure painting conventions or figure painting events at larger tabletop gaming conventions.

== Models ==
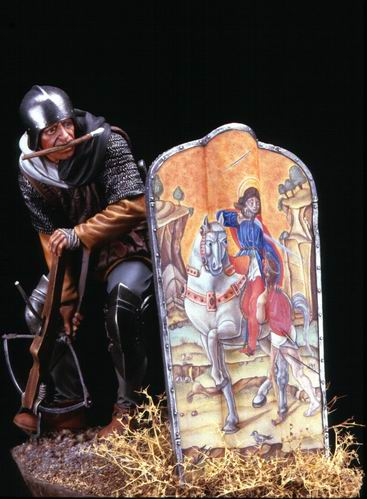
This model of a crossbowman has a detailed coat of paint

The models used for figure painting can vary greatly in materials, genres, subject matter, and style. These differences often relate to the production intention, whether the models are made purely with gaming in mind (gaming models), purely with painting and display in mind (display models), or gaming models made with consideration for painters.

=== Materials ===
Originally, all scale models produced were made of metal. Early models, produced for miniature wargames such as H. G. Wells Little Wars, were hollow cast and made from lead. These were not made with painting as a consideration, although could be painted to help distinguish forces and armies at a glance. Models continued to be made from metal for many decades, with the models produced by Jack Scruby, credited for the rebirth of the miniature wargaming hobby in the 1950s, being made from type metal. These would be hand sculpted in clays then cast into a mold to be used to produce copies.

Models continued to be made from lead-based white metal alloys until the early 90s. In 1993 the New York legislature banned the use of lead in miniatures following health concerns, so many model manufacturers began casting in lead-free white metal alloys as there was a widespread concern that other states would introduce similar regulations, often at higher prices. Although the legislation was eventually changed to exempt miniatures, many manufacturers continued to use the lead-free metals. As this became more widespread more manufacturers began moving away from lead metals, with lead being rarely used anymore.

Models produced in metal had limitations. The price and density of metal made producing larger models both cost and weight prohibitive. For the production of larger models sometimes parts would be cast in injection molded plastic, such as the wings of a large dragon, so that the model could stand without the need for support or risk of breaking under their own weight.

Once plastic had been introduced to miniature production, it started to become more widespread. Manufacturers began to produce models entirely in plastics as a cheaper alternative to metal. Early plastic models often lacked well defined details as the softer plastics used, such as soft PVC, held details less easily and the casting processes were less successful than the established metal casting process. For this reason metal models were, for a long time, considered superior to early plastic models.

As the casting process was refined and newer plastics were introduced the details that could be cast in plastic improved. Plastic models started to become much more common, being produced to high levels of details and sold as equivalent quality or superior quality premium product compared to metal. Many companies now produce all or the majority of their models in high quality plastics, often polystyrene. With the increase in production of plastic models the models produced could be made increasingly larger and with more details. Whilst hand sculpting a master to then cast a mold is still a common practice, it is becoming increasingly common for models to be digitally sculpted and a master 3D printed to then cast the molds from. This has greatly increased the quality of details that can be sculpted, as finer details can be included. For these higher levels of detail, plastic models have become more popular for higher standards of painting, as well as plastic models being less susceptible to flashing or casting imperfections and requiring less preparations before painting. Plastic models also allow for more options in the pose of the models as they are often sold on the sprue in pieces to be assembled, rather than a single piece of cast material. This allows for the kit to include multiple parts, as plastic is significantly cheaper than metal, that can fit together to allow multiple different variations of the model to be built, for example a kit might provide multiple different weapon options.

Despite this, metal models are still widely and commonly available as plastic casting is more cost prohibitive for smaller manufacturers. The plastic casting process is cheaper for mass production, but expensive on a small scale as the steel molds are expensive to produce and maintain, so whilst many larger manufacturers have moved from metal to plastic, many smaller manufacturers continue to use metal.

Models are also sometimes cast in polyurethane resins. Resin shares some of the advantages as plastics over metals. They are lighter, so can make larger models, can cast higher levels of details, and will often require less preparation before painting than metals. This makes resin a common choice for smaller manufacturers of larger scale models with high levels of details intended for display or competition painting, where resin casts can match the details of plastic models whilst still being affordable for smaller production lines. However, resins are often more brittle than plastics, with small details likely to break so, whilst smaller scale resin models are still produced where the productions are small, plastics are still favored by most manufacturers for smaller and mass-produced models.

=== Genre, subject and style ===
Models are produced in almost every genre. Due to the prominent links of production to miniature wargames the most common genres that models are made in are fantasy, sci-fi, and historical/military. The connection to wargames also means that a majority of models available are single characters (sold individually or in unit sets) in offensive or defensive poses. Within the broad genres, there is still large variation in the models produced by different manufacturers or even by the same manufacturer in different lines. For example, Games Workshop produces models for Age of Sigmar and Middle Earth SBG, both of which are fantasy settings, however the style and aesthetic of the dark fantasy Age of Sigmar is very visually distinct from the high fantasy Middle Earth SBG.

Models produced for gaming can either be generic figures or specific variations on common tropes unique to a manufacturer, for example a generic goblin figure or a licensed model sculpted to fit the unique Pathfinder goblin design. Manufacturers also often have a specific house style or aesthetic for models they produce across all lines as part of their visual identity, so models are easily recognized.

Outside of gaming models, models can vary even further. Often models are sculpted with similar subject matter, many being produced depicting sci-fi, fantasy, or historical characters in combat stances, however the restriction of models needing to fit a game's style, setting, or scale do not exist for non-gaming models. As such, the range of genres and subjects is wider, including models of prominent non-military historical figures, figures of contemporary individuals, licensed figures of media characters, or original characters in different settings and scenarios. It is also common for display models to be sculpted as depicting a snapshot moment to tell a narrative story in tableau. As such, display models are often sculpted with a more realistic style.

It is also common for models not to depict human or humanoid characters. Many gaming systems include rules for using vehicles, such as aircraft or tanks, or mechs so there are many available gaming figures to represent these in gameplay. There are also companies that make scale kits of vehicles such as aircraft or tanks as standalone models rather than gaming pieces, such as Airfix models, however there is often a distinction made between those who paint such kits (scale modellers) and figure painters. It is also common for both gaming models and display models to depict mundane animals and fantasy creatures, either as single models or as part of a diorama set.

Some companies also produce detailed scale busts for display and competition painting. As a subset of display models, these can vary just as widely in subject and setting.

== Model sizes ==
Models come in a variety of different scales. The size of full body figures is commonly given in millimeters, although the stated size of the models is not always accurate due to scale-creep, where over time models have become larger whilst still being called the same scale. For example, Games Workshop models are still stated as being 28mm scale, however over years of production the size has crept up and they're now closer to 32mm scale. The size of busts is almost exclusively given as a ratio scale rather than in millimeters.

The most commonly found full model scale is 28mm scale as this is the most common scale used by gaming companies in recent years, although these models can be closer to 32mm scale or even 35mm scale due to scale-creep. Additional to scale-creep, often models that are sold and marketed as being a 28mm scale have anatomical features such as hands and heads that are out of proportion with the rest of the model. Originally a result of limitations fine details in metal, this is commonly done as a stylistic choice to create a more imposing or impressive looking character, referred to as "heroic" scale. Models made to be exactly in scale are referred to as "true" scale. Heroic scale and scale-creep are more common in sci-fi and fantasy models than historical or military war game models, although true scale models can still sometimes suffer from heroic proportions.

Other common scales for models are 54mm and 72mm. These are less common as few games use models this big. Companies that make models in these sizes are often independent producers of models intended to be display models. As these models do not often get used for games they do not often suffer from scale creep. The larger scale offers more opportunity for higher levels of detail that would otherwise be impossible to cast in smaller scales, as well as the larger size offering more physical space to include such details. Due to their larger size and higher levels of detail these are often the scales of choice for competition painters, where size restrictions allow them.

For busts, the most common scales are 1:12 scale and 1:10 scale. These provide enough size to allow for sufficient detail, without being so large that the cast shadow of the sculpt onto itself interferes with the painting, as would happen with larger scales. As there is less prevalence of scale-creep in busts, and the larger size would make a heroic scale obvious and unnatural looking, many bust manufacturers have begun to include the upper torso and arms, as well as any held objects such as weapons, or even the whole torso from the waist up, as opposed to a more traditional bust of just the shoulders up. This is to increase the size of the models for additional visual interest and the physical surface area for additional details, and is most common with companies that produce busts specifically as display models or as competition pieces.

== Paints ==
Many different types of paints can be used for figure painting to achieve different effects and finishes. Originally, enamel paints, such as Testors and Humbrol, were almost exclusively used for figure painting as these were all that was widely available. These provided strong colors, were able to adhere well to the metal models of the time, as well as later plastic models, and the long drying time of 12–24 hours meant they were able to self level to a smooth finish. However, enamel paints also has some properties that many figure painters find undesirable. These include the need for specialist thinners for thinning and brush cleaning, limitations on techniques that can be used compared to other paint types, the long drying time making painting highlights and shadows a longer process, and the requirement to paint outside or in well ventilated areas due to toxic fumes that the paints give off. Whilst still popular in scale modelling communities, the disadvantages of enamel paints compared to other paint types has caused them to become less popular among figure painters, especially those who paint to advanced standards.

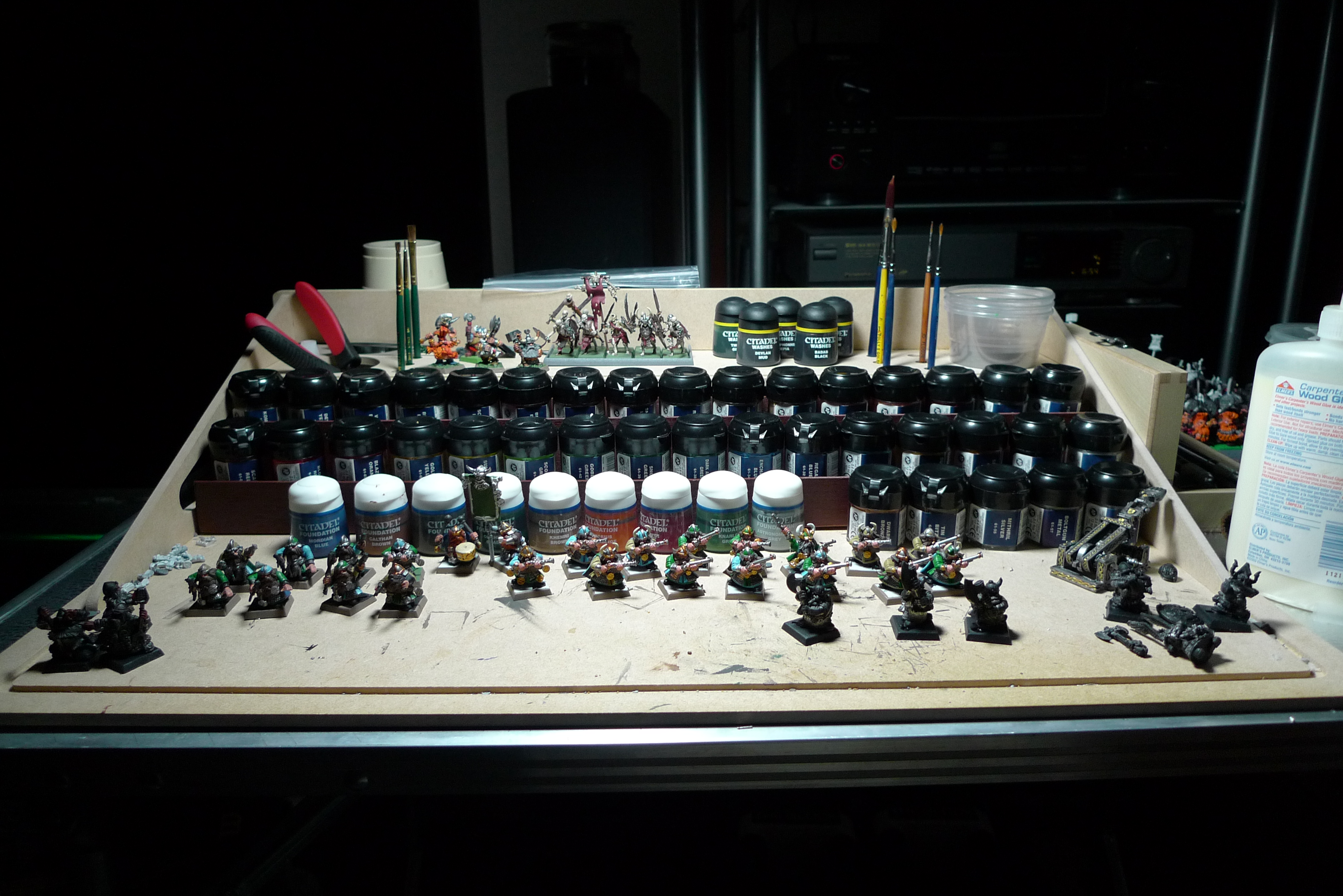
An artist's paint station, with acrylic paints, brushes and other tools

As acrylic paints began to become more widely available, companies began making acrylic paints that were formulated specifically for figure painting, characterized by being thinner than artist acrylic paints, with more flow, and having higher pigment density and more finely ground pigment than cheaper craft acrylics. These include companies that only make paints and paint related products, such as Acrylicos Vallejo's Model Color and Game Color lines, companies that make paints to supplement gaming model lines, such as Games Workshop's Warhammer Colour paints, and companies that make paints to supplement display model lines, such as Scale75's Scalecolor paints. Thin medium acrylic paints are most common, however some companies also make gel consistency medium based acrylic paints, such as Warcolour paints. The major benefits of acrylic paints over enamel paints are the faster drying time, that acrylics can be thinned with water, that various mediums and additives (e.g. retarders, surfactants, etc.) can be mixed in to assist in painting, that multiple thinned and semi-transparent layers of paint can be used to create blending and effects, and being non-toxic. For all of their advantages, acrylic paints are the most popular choice among figure painters, with the majority of painters, particularly display and competition painters, using exclusively acrylic or mostly acrylic with some other paint types used for achieving specific effects, although some figure painters still use enamels out of personal preference or nostalgia. As well as acrylic paints formulated for figure painting, it is possible to use regular "heavy body" acrylics to achieve highly detailed results, provided they are of a high artist grade quality.

Oil paints can also be used for figure painting. The slow drying time allows for painting wet-on-wet, commonly called wetblending by figure painters, to produce smooth blends of color and value. When using oil paints for figure painting it is usual to first apply a coat of acrylic paint to provide a starting color foundation, followed by a coat of a gloss or matte varnish to avoid the risk of oil thinners stripping the acrylic. Using oil paints in this way to paint entire models is much less common than acrylic paints, although is popular among display painters who specialize in historical models, and is often considered a more advanced method compared to acrylic paints. A more common use for oil paints in figure painting is to paint the model with acrylics then use thinned down oil paint to apply oil washes for shading.

Other paint types can be used, but are much less common. Lacquer paints can be used for applying fast drying and very hard wearing, chip and scratch resistant coats of paint through an airbrush, but are even more toxic than enamels so are not widely used. Watercolors can be used for weathering effects as they can create dust or dirt effects quickly and can be reactivated with water to remove excess, such as for pinwashing, although these cannot be easily used to paint the full model and require sealing with a varnish after application.

== Tools ==
=== Preparation ===
It is common for models to require some preparation before they can be painted and a variety of tools can be used for this. Plastic and resin models will often need to be removed from the sprue. This can be done with a hobby knife or a pair of small scissors, although many companies make specialized "hobby clippers" to make cutting easier and more flush to model pieces. It may also be necessary to remove flash on model parts, which can be done with a hobby knife or "mold line removers" that some companies make. Once the model pieces are cleaned they are glued together with cyanoacrylate super-glues or, for plastic models, plastic cement. Pinning may also be necessary. Once assembled it may be necessary to remove excess glue or smooth the model's surface with small files or fine grit sandpaper and any gaps from where the pieces do not fit flush together filled with an epoxy putty, such as Milliput. Once the model is fully prepared, primer is commonly applied.

=== Painting ===
Brushes used for figure painting vary by the type of paint used and techniques employed. For paints that require specific chemical thinners, such as enamels, lacquers, and oils, synthetic fiber brushes are often recommended for longer life as the thinners can cause natural fibers to deteriorate over time, although natural bristle brushes are often used for finer details. For acrylic paints that can be thinned with water there is less concern about bristle deterioration. Many acrylic painters consider kolinsky sable brushes to be the best quality brushes for painting, as they offer a great deal of control over the flow of paint and a sharp, precise tip for painting fine details. Brush sizes can vary depending on the task. Some painters use extremely small brushes for painting the very fine details of a model. When working with slow drying paints such as enamels this can be true as the smaller brush sizes can produce finer lines more easily. However, when working with fast drying acrylics, the small amounts of paint in a small size brush can dry quickly in the bristles, damaging the brush and making painting difficult. Therefore many highly skilled display and competition painters advise against small brushes, instead recommending using larger brushes that have very finely pointed tips, such as kolinsky sable brushes for precise and detailed painting.

Airbrushes are also a commonly used tool for figure painting. An airbrush can be used to apply primer, either single color or zenithal, basecoats, and varnish quickly across large areas, as well as finer detail work such as creating color or value gradients and applying tints or glazes to large areas. For fine detail work smaller needle sizes are preferred, although larger needle sizes are preferred to speed up less detailed applications. Gravity-feed airbrushes are preferred over side- or bottom-feed as there is less paint wastage, and dual-action is often preferred over single-action as it provides greater spray control.

A palette is used to thin and mix paints. Thinning paints when figure painting is essential as the small details can easily become clogged up with thickly applied paint. Any non-porous material, such as a ceramic tile, can be used as a palette and many hobbying companies sell wet palettes and palette paper pads. Many figure painters who work in acrylic use wet palettes to keep their paints from drying out too quickly during a painting session. These are often homemade from household supplies, however some use commercial ones made by art supply manufacturers or by hobby companies specifically for figure painting.

== Competition ==
Many competitions for figure painting exist for painters to take part in at a variety of levels.

Many miniature hobbying stores and gaming stores host small scale competitions where local patrons can compete, either for simply the title of winning or prizes, such as products or store vouchers, either held as a regular standalone event or as part of a larger special event. These can be judged by popular vote of attendees or judged by the store employees or other external judges, such as a highly regarded painter local to the area. Such competitions can vary widely in quality standard depending on the standard of local painters. It is common for these competitions to have a small number of categories, such a single model and unit, or to have a single theme, such as "large monster" or "Paint Your Hero", and often with a distinction between adult and youth entries.

There are also many large scale competitions held internationally for painters of an advanced skill level, either held as standalone events or as part of larger gaming conventions. These are often either sponsored or organized by gaming companies or miniature companies, such as the Resin Beast competition hosted by Creature Caster at AdeptiCon or the Golden Demon competition organized by Games Workshop at their annual Warhammer Fest event, although they are also sometimes independently organized by the conventions themselves. Competitions often have multiple categories to enter in. Some common categories seen at many competitions include Single Figure, Diorama, Unit, and Vehicle, often further subcategorized by genre, such as fantasy, sci-fi, and historical, and an "anything goes" open category without size, subject matter, or entrant restrictions is also common. These events often attract painters from around the world who wish to compete at the highest level. Competitions can be judged as either a "traditional" style judging system or an "open" style scoring system. In traditional judging systems entries are given a first cut to finalists with a surface observation by judges, then the finalist entries are inspected more closely to determine the 1st, 2nd, and 3rd place in each category, often with commended entries being given out to entries that were close to placing. In the open system of judging entries are scored in a number of different areas, such as technical skill or composition, and the total score for each entry determines what award it is given, often titled Bronze, Silver, and Gold. In such a competition there is no restriction on how many entries can be given each award – hypothetically an award might have no entries given out for it or all entries might achieve Gold if all entries are of an extremely high level. Many competitions also give an award for the piece judged Best in Show, such as the Slayer Sword prize in Golden Demon. Another style of judging is a combined system, where entries are ranked by popular online vote and in person judging. Large scale painting competitions offer a variety of prizes, such as products produced by the sponsor company, a cash prize, or simply a title and trophy or other object, such as the winner of the Slayer Sword at Golden Demon being awarded a physical sword in place of a trophy.

There are also a number of online only competitions, where painters submit photos of their painted models into different categories which are then voted on by popular vote. Sometimes the popular vote informs a final cut, which is then judged by a professional judging panel, such as with Games Workshop's Everchosen competition where each Games Workshop store and some independent hobby stores hosted small local competitions, where the winners for each store were uploaded to the Everchosen webpage for public vote with the top 100 being then reviewed by a professional judging panel to determine the 1st, 2nd, and 3rd winners.
