= Putty =

Common material used as sealant or filler

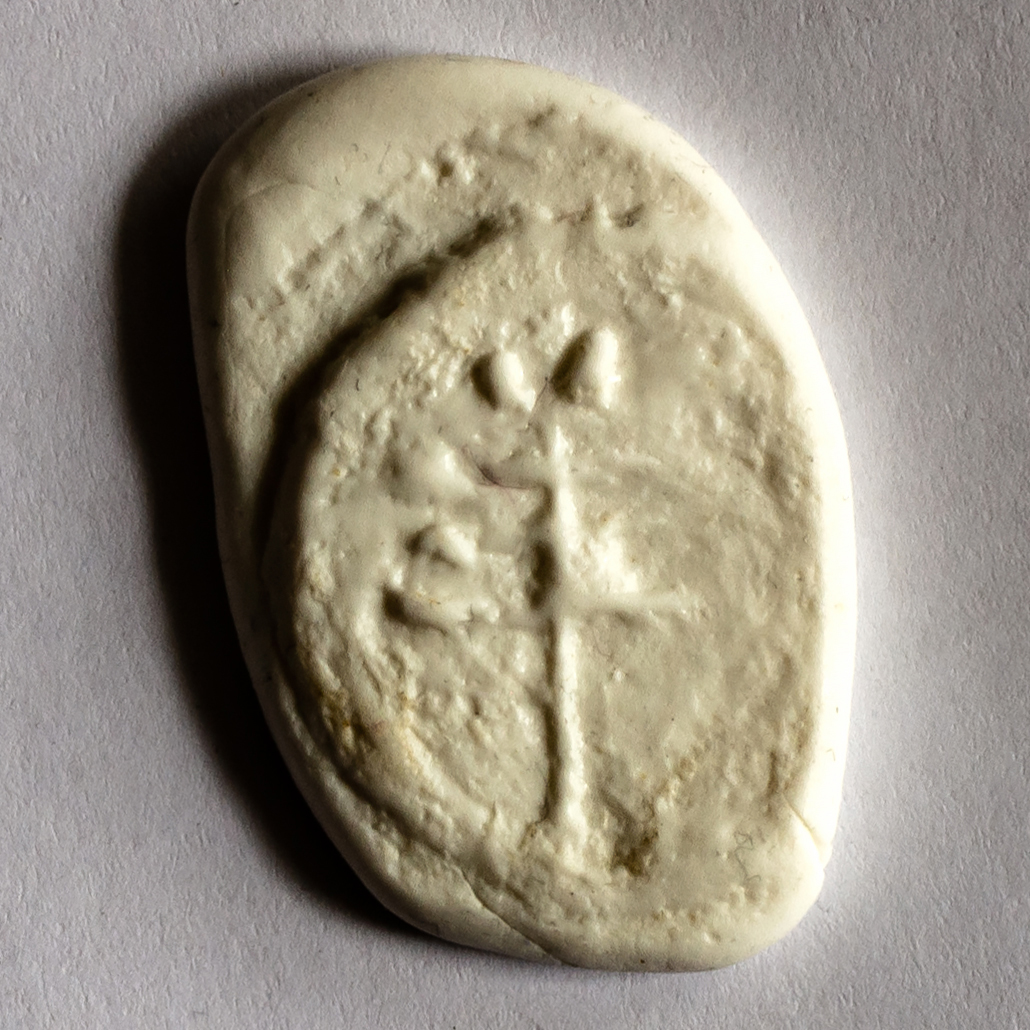
A blob of putty

Putty is a material with high plasticity, similar in texture to clay or dough, typically used in domestic construction and repair as a sealant or filler. Although some types of putty (typically those using linseed oil) slowly polymerise and become stiff, many putties can be reworked indefinitely, in contrast to other types of filler which typically set solid relatively rapidly.

== Chemical composition ==
Putty, or lime putty, is made from a mixture of calcium oxide (CaO) and water (H_{2}O) in proportions of 38% and 62% by weight respectively. As a result, the solution forms hydrated lime (Ca(OH)_{2}) which takes up about a half of the weight.

The other putty mixture may be a calcium carbonate (CaCO_{3,} 750-850 parts) based with an admixture of CaO (ash calcium, 120-180 parts), white cement (40-60 parts), and talc powders in much lower concentrations (fractions).

== Applications ==
=== Use in construction ===
Putty has been used extensively in glazing for fixing and sealing panes of glass into wooden frames (or sashes), although its use is decreasing with the prevalence of PVC and metal window frames which use synthetic sealants such as silicone. Glazing putty is traditionally made by mixing a base of whiting (finely ground chalk) with linseed oil in various proportions. Historically, white lead was sometimes mixed with the whiting. There are a number of synthetic alternatives such as polybutene-based putties, where the polybutene is a low molecular weight oligomer replacing the linseed oil. Butyl rubber is also added to the mixture to provide some strength and flexibility.

Painter's putty is typically a linseed oil-based product used for filling holes, minor cracks, and defacements in wood only.

Putties can also be made intumescent, in which case they are used for firestopping as well as for padding of electrical outlet boxes in fire-resistance rated drywall assemblies. In the latter case, hydrates in the putty produce an endothermic reaction to mitigate heat transfer to the unexposed side.

In woodworking, water-based putties are more commonly used, as these emit very little odour, are more easily cleaned up and are compatible with water-based and latex sealers.

=== Two-part hardening putties ===
Polyester putty and epoxy putty are thermosetting polymers that can be molded by hand, but become permanently rigid after curing. Pratley Putty is an epoxy putty used primarily for steel bonding. Milliput is another popular multipurpose epoxy putty. Bondo is a polyester-based automotive body filler, which is commonly used in collision repair.

=== Plumber's putty ===
Plumber's putty or plumber's mait is the common name encompassing a variety of products of completely different compositions, all used for making watertight seals in plumbing. It is a pliable substance used to make watertight seals around faucets and drains. The putty is a basic component of a plumber's toolkit and is often used when replacing plumbing fixtures. Plumber's putty formulations vary but commonly include powdered clay and linseed oil. Other formulas use limestone, talc, or fish oil.

A similar material known as Tung putty, made from lime and tung oil, is used in plumbing and a waterproof sealing in Chinese cultures.

Plumber's putty contains mineral oils and/or vegetable oils so it can stain porous materials such as marble or some plastics. The oils can also react chemically with some plastics, slowly making them brittle.

RTV silicone or epoxy sealants may be used in place of putty.

=== Other uses ===
Certain types of putty also have use in the field of terminal ballistics, where the putty can accurately represent the average density of the human body. As such it can be used, for instance, to test the penetrative power of projectiles, or the stopping power of body armour.

Modeling clay and play putty, such as Plasticine and Silly Putty are common toys.

== See also ==
- Blu Tack
- Caulk
- Grain filler
- Rope caulk
- Spackling paste
- Tung putty
- Wood putty
- Whitewash
