= Citadel Miniatures =

English wargame miniature company

- Industry: Miniature wargaming
- Genre: Scale models
- Headquarters: Nottingham, England
- Products: Metal, plastic and resin miniature figures
- Parent: Games Workshop Group PLC

Citadel Miniatures Limited is a company which produces metal, resin and plastic miniature figures for tabletop wargames such as Warhammer Fantasy Battle and Warhammer 40,000.

In the past, Citadel Miniatures was a separate company, but it has become a brand for Games Workshop miniatures. Although its models are used for the wargaming hobby, the painting of its miniatures (and miniatures in general) is a hobby in itself.

== Early history ==
In August 1976, Bryan Ansell co-founded Asgard Miniatures with Steven Fitzwater and Paul Sulley in Nottingham and became its lead sculptor. Ansell was an experienced sculptor, having previously worked at Conquest Miniatures. Ansell left Asgard Miniatures in February 1978 to form successful rival Citadel Miniatures with funding from Games Workshop.

Less than a year later, in December 1978, Citadel Miniatures was started by Ansell/Games Workshop, as announced in White Dwarf issue 11:

Games Workshop and Bryan Ansell have got together to keep-alive Citadel Miniatures, a new miniatures company that will be manufacturing several ranges of figures. Ral Partha are already in production, but Citadel will also be producing own ranges, including the Fiend Factory figures, Fantasy Adventurers and Fantasy Specials. Citadel will not be limiting production to SF/F figures, but also new ranges of historical wargaming figures.

The following issue of White Dwarf contained the first advertisement for Citadel's forthcoming figures.

== Materials and construction ==
Originally miniatures were produced using a white metal alloy including lead, although in January 1987, Citadel began to produce plastic miniatures as well under the name "Psychostyrene" and "Drastik Plastik". Citadel has continued to produce white metal miniatures as the economics of plastic make it only suitable for large runs. Some models are a combination of both materials, with the arm-less bodies and heads metal and the arms, weapons and other accessories plastic.

In February 1997 Citadel switched to a lead-free white metal because of concerns about lead poisoning, particularly in children.

Most of the models created by Citadel require some form of construction after purchase. With smaller models this usually involves attaching arms, weapons and the base. Larger models come in many pieces and require more construction.

On 16 May 2011, Games Workshop announced a new range of Citadel models known as Citadel Finecast. Advertised as a new advancement in resin casting, Finecast replaced a selection of existing white metal miniatures. The light weight and relative softness of the resin was touted as being easier for new hobbyists to work with, while crisper details would make them a dream come true for expert painters. However, Finecast has had mixed reviews by modellers. Air bubbles, mold slippage, and warping was prevalent among Finecast kits and many in the hobby community complained about the poor quality of the miniatures compared to their white metal predecessors. For example, Wayland Games, a retailer in UK, includes the following note on Finecast on their website: "Note: If you wish to purchase any Finecast products please accept that this is a product for experienced modellers only and that some remedial effort is required due to the nature of the material and manufacturing techniques. If in doubt please do not purchase."

== Model ranges ==
From April 1979 to December 1984 Citadel had a reciprocal distribution and manufacturing deal with Ral Partha to bring each other's products to Britain and North America respectively.

Citadel has also produced and distributed miniatures under other names:

- Chronicle Miniatures was a competitor run by Nick Lund. It was bought out by Citadel and they continued to operate under that name for a time.
- Iron Claw Miniatures were a range of miniatures designed, manufactured and distributed by Citadel from February 1987 until October 1988 and sculpted by Bob Olley. Many of the designs were later incorporated into the main Citadel range.
- Marauder Miniatures was a separate company set up by two former Games Workshop-Citadel sculptors (Aly Morrison and Trish Morrison) in November 1988 and promoted alongside Citadel Miniatures in White Dwarf. The miniatures were cast and distributed by Citadel, and the company was absorbed into Citadel in August 1993. Numerous retail outlets such as the Medway Games Centre in Chatham, Kent, and elsewhere across the United Kingdom, stocked Citadel Miniatures, as they became so popular, especially from March 1982 and onwards.

Over the years, as well as Citadel producing their own original miniatures, they have produced licensed ranges based on characters from games, movies, TV series and books. These included figures based on RuneQuest, Fighting Fantasy, Judge Dredd, Doctor Who, Paranoia, Eternal Champion, Dungeons & Dragons, Advanced Dungeons & Dragons, Traveller, Star Trek, Lone Wolf and The Lord of the Rings and The Hobbit. Games Workshop re-won the Lord of the Rings licence, allowing them to make The Lord of the Rings Strategy Battle Game miniatures to tie-in with the trilogy of films released by New Line Cinema, and have extended the range to include characters based on the actual writings of J. R. R. Tolkien.

Citadel Miniatures sometimes release limited edition models of specific or unusual characters, such as Thrud the Barbarian, (Note: Four versions of Thrud have been produced included "Thrudd and Female Admirer" and Thrudd scratching his head) Ian Livingstone, drunken Space Marines dressed in Christmas outfits and several representing Grombrindal, the white-bearded logo of White Dwarf magazine.

Along with the standard range of miniature soldiers, lines of Citadel include fantasy based war-machines, like catapults and chariots, and when Warhammer 40,000 came out, Citadel Miniatures also branched out into vehicles, such as the Land Raider and Rhino transports for Space Marines.

== Reception ==
Edwin Joseph Rotondaro reviewed Citadel Miniatures 25 mm miniature figures released in March 1984 and October 1985 in The Space Gamer No. 76. Rotondaro commented that "Overall, I highly recommend Citadel miniatures to gamers who use any FRPG system, and especially if they use the Warhammer rules."

Mike Willis & Martyn Tetlow reviewed Citadel Miniatures for Adventurer magazine and stated that "It is in the pure fantasy genre that Citadel models have made their mark and in which they are contenders for the position of market leader, as reflected by the votes of the public at conventions and through White Dwarf, with their staple figures of roleplaying and miniature wargames; Chaos Warriors, Orcs, Dwarfs and Fighters, and the demand for more of these is apparently insatiable."

== See also ==
- Advanced Dungeons & Dragons Miniatures
- Forge World
- Miniature conversion
