= Alliance of Light =

Alliance of Light may refer to:

- Alliance of Light, the third story arc in the Wars of Light and Shadow by Janny Wurts
- The Alliance of Light, a player-created strategy group in The War of the Ring online campaign
