= WOTR =

WOTR may refer to:

- The War of the Ring Online Campaign
- WOTR (FM), a radio station (96.3 FM) licensed to Lost Creek, West Virginia, United States
- WWCB, a radio station (1370 AM) licensed to Corry, Pennsylvania, United States, used the WOTR call sign from 1955 to 1972
- The Wars of the Roses
- The War of the Rohirrim
