= Green stuff =

Green stuff can refer to:

- money (slang)
- A type of epoxy putty, sometimes sold under the brand name Kneadatite, used by modelers and sculptors
- A mint and coriander seasoning, often used as a raita
- A dish also known as Watergate salad
