= Conversion kit =

Conversion kit may refer to:

- Arcade conversion kit, which is used to change the game an arcade machine plays
- Miniature conversion kit, equipment used to alter game pieces for miniature, tabletop games.
- Pinball conversion kit, which is used to re-theme a pinball machine
- Vehicle conversion kit, used for electric vehicle conversion
