= VMPS =

VMPS may refer to:

- Vivekanand Memorial Public School, a school in Raisinghnagar, India
- VLAN Management Policy Server, a networking protocol
- Veritone Minimum Phase Speakers, a manufacturer of loudspeakers
