= Advanced Dungeons & Dragons Miniatures =

Role-playing game accessory

Licensed miniature of ogre mage by Citadel Miniatures, 1985, featuring tab joining feet that will fit into slot in separate base

One of the last licensed blister packs produced by Ral Partha, 1997, featuring 2nd Edition AD&D branding

Advanced Dungeons & Dragons Miniatures is a line of miniatures produced under license by a number of companies and published by TSR for use with the fantasy role-playing game Advanced Dungeons & Dragons (AD&D).

== History ==
Even as TSR published the first version of Dungeons & Dragons in 1974, several companies were already making fantasy-themed miniatures, notably Der Kriegspielers Fantastiques, which had just produced a line of miniatures based on J. R. R. Tolkien's The Lord of the Rings, and Jack Scruby's The Soldier Factory. Although miniatures were not listed as an essential element of play in the first versions of D&D, several companies quickly formed to produce miniatures for use with the game, including Archive Miniatures (California), and Asgard Miniatures (UK). These companies all produced generic fantasy figures, since they were not licensed to produce figures based on TSR's products.

In 1977, TSR licensed a British company, Minifigs, to produce a line of 25 mm figures for D&D. With the publication of AD&D, TSR licensed Grenadier Models in 1980 to produce 25 mm miniatures for the game. Over the next three years, Grenadier produced:

- 16 blister packs (although 20 were planned), each containing 2–5 miniatures
- 13 small boxed sets, each containing 9 miniatures
- 5 large boxed sets, each containing 20–27 small miniatures or 5 large multipart miniatures
- 6 "Action Art" boxed sets, each containing 9–12 miniatures deemed especially suitable for painting

In 1982, TSR disagreed with Grenadier's plans to start producing fantasy miniatures for other companies, and TSR subsequently terminated Grenadier's AD&D license at the end of 1982.

TSR began to produce miniatures on their own, and during the next two years, produced eight boxed sets and 23 blisters packs. These were not seen as having the same level of quality as Grenadier, and they were not well received.

In 1985, TSR licensed Citadel Miniatures to produce official AD&D miniatures. Several things differentiated Citadel's miniatures from previous works.

- Instead of standing on its own cast base, each figure had a tab underneath the figure's feet that fitted into a slot in a separate base.
- Miniatures representing player characters were released in sets of three: a poor low-level character, a prosperous mid-level character, and a wealthy and powerful high-level character

From June 1985 until the end of 1986, under the AD&D banner, Citadel produced

- 21 blister packs containing three levels of a particular character
- 75 blister packs containing a variety of characters and monsters

At the end of 1986, TSR abruptly terminated Citadel's license, leaving Citadel holding a large amount of stock, which they were forced to sell off at half-price. TSR immediately signed a licensing agreement with Ral Partha to produce AD&D miniatures. Ral Partha produced individual figures for AD&D in great numbers, as well as 13 boxed sets that each contained 8–10 miniatures. With the release of the second edition of AD&D in 1989, Ral Partha continued to market the same lines of figures with "Second Edition" added to their packaging.

When Wizards of the Coast took over TSR in 1997, they ended Ral Partha's license, bringing the production of official AD&D miniatures to an end.

== Reception ==
In the June 1983 edition of Different Worlds (Issue 29), John T. Sapienza reviewed eight blister packs of AD&D miniatures produced by Grenadier, finding all of them to be of good quality. He especially liked a figurine of a djinn, calling it "very handsome indeed."

In the January 1984 edition of Imagine (Issue 10), Ian J. Knight reviewed the AD&D miniatures being produced by Citadel, and stated that "The models themselves are in the Ral Partha/Citadel style, well animated, with lots of character and a good degree of detail definition, though a few seem a little thin when studied side-on - and heavy-handed gamers might find some of the sword blades vulnerable, as the metal is quite soft." Knight concluded that these were "a good set of figures intelligently presented."

In a retrospective review, Richard Scott noted that Citadel's AD&D monsters "had a definite 'UK flavour'", since many of them were taken from the Fiend Folio, a British publication. Scott also noted that for the first time, "lots of the monsters were produced with subtle variations in weaponry, clothing and facial features", allowing a gamemaster to put together large groups of monsters that had enough variation to allow for individuality. Scott called this a "welcome innovation."

In a review of Advanced Dungeons & Dragons figurines in 2014 in Black Gate, Mark Rigney said "I like having a little bit of my history in the house, and thanks to this surprise gift, any time I wish to rocket myself back to 1981, all I need do is open the lid..."
