= Alan Perry =

Alan Perry may refer to:

- One half of the sculpting partnership Alan and Michael Perry
- A pseudonym for the composer Ernest Tomlinson
