= Middle-earth Strategy Battle Game =

Tabletop miniature wargame

- Cover of The Lord of the Rings Strategy Battle Game rulebook
- Manufacturers: Games Workshop
- Publishers: Games Workshop
- Years active: 2001–present
- Genres: Wargaming
- Players: 2+
- Setup time: 5–10 minutes (depending on size of game)
- Playing time: Approximately 2.5 hours per 500 points of miniatures
- Chance: Medium (dice rolling)
- Skills: Military strategy, arithmetic
- Website: warhammer.com/middle-earth-lp
- Game length varies according to battle size, while rules complexity can vary by army.

Middle-earth Strategy Battle Game (previously marketed as The Lord of the Rings Strategy Battle Game, The Hobbit: An Unexpected Journey Strategy Battle Game, The Hobbit: The Desolation of Smaug Strategy Battle Game and The Hobbit: The Battle of Five Armies Strategy Battle Game) is a tabletop miniature wargame produced by Games Workshop. It is based on The Lord of the Rings and The Hobbit film trilogies directed by Peter Jackson, and the books that inspired them, written by J. R. R. Tolkien.

The game was initially released in 2001 to coincide in with the film The Fellowship of the Ring. New box sets with updated rules were also released for The Two Towers and The Return of the King films. Later, beginning with the Shadow and Flame supplement, Games Workshop began to add content that was featured in the original book but not in the film adaptations: e.g. Tom Bombadil and Glorfindel. Games Workshop has also expanded its licence with original material on areas such as Harad and Khand, with mixed reactions. Another complete edition of the rules, often called The One Rulebook to Rule them All, was released by Games Workshop in September 2005, while a compact edition entitled The Mines of Moria was also released. This was superseded by a new rule book in 2018, called simply Middle-earth Strategy Battle Game Rules Manual. This new rule book combined the original LotR SBG and Hobbit SBG into one cohesive, cross compatible rule set.

In early 2009, Games Workshop also released an expansion to the original game called War of the Ring which, according to the company, allows players to emulate the large battles included in J. R. R. Tolkien's The Lord of the Rings by streamlining the game system. This expansion differs from the main game in several ways. Firstly, War of the Ring uses a larger number of models but the models are placed on movement trays with two cavalry models or eight infantry models on each. This allows for much easier and quicker movement of large numbers of models at once. These are called "companies". Larger creatures such as Ents and Trolls are treated as separate models and do not use movement trays. Combat within the game is also treated differently. In the original game players both roll dice to determine who wins the fight and then the victor rolls to see how much damage is done. In War of the Ring only dice to determine damage are rolled. Also, in War of the Ring, heroes are treated more like upgrades for their company rather than individual models, as they are in the original game.

In addition to gaming, The Lord of the Rings Strategy Battle Game includes other common elements of the miniature wargaming hobby. These include the collecting, painting and conversion of miniature figures used in play, as well as the modelling of gaming terrain from scratch. These aspects of the hobby are covered in Games Workshop's monthly White Dwarf and on various gaming websites, as well as formerly in the fortnightly Battle Games in Middle-earth.

In 2015 Forge World, a division of Games Workshop focused on specialist resin miniatures and conversion kits as well as the Specialist Games ranges, assumed production of The Lord of the Rings Strategy Battle Game and all supplements.

== Development ==
=== Background ===
In the 1980s, Games Workshop produced a range of miniatures for The Lord of the Rings, using original character designs based on fantasy art popular of the time. This was the first range of Lord of the Rings miniatures that Citadel created, taking over from Grenadier Miniatures in 1985, before the licence passed to Mithril Miniatures around 1987. The earliest releases were semi-solid base, having a small solid base; later releases were slot based.

=== Current licensing ===
The current Lord of the Rings range stems from Games Workshop's rights to produce a skirmish war game based on The Lord of the Rings and The Hobbit books and films, in the 25mm miniature scale. (The rights to produce a role playing game version of the films were sold to another firm, Decipher, Inc.) They also have the rights to produce Battle of Five Armies, a game based on the battle of similar name from The Hobbit, using smaller miniatures to enact larger battles (more akin to the Warmaster system). Under this separate licence, the game was done using a 10 mm scale for the normal warriors, and a larger "heroic" scale for the named characters.

Games Workshop has not acquired the rights to The Silmarillion, which is still the exclusive property of the Tolkien Estate, but has the right to develop its own derivative intellectual property to fill in the gaps in The Lord of the Rings universe. This is particularly true of Harad, which has a range of invented places (such as "Kârna", "Badharkân", "Hidâr", "Nâfarat", "Abrakân", and "Dhâran-sar") and characters (such as the Hasharin and "Dalamyr, Fleetmaster of Umbar").

=== Designers and Peter Jackson ===
Four of the game's designers were in the extended Return of the King film as Rohirrim at the Battle of the Pelennor Fields: Alessio Cavatore, Brian Nelson, and Alan and Michael Perry. They can be seen near the Oliphaunt when Peregrin Took goes searching for Meriadoc Brandybuck among the debris from the battle, and are also on the base of Games Workshop's Mûmak miniature. Games Workshop created two miniatures of Peter Jackson, based on his appearance as a Breeland man during the Fellowship of the Ring: one is owned by the director, and the other is kept on display at Warhammer World in England. Games Workshop has also released a model of Peter Jackson as one of the Corsairs of Umbar from The Return of the King.

== Hobbyist community ==
=== Collectors ===
Similar to Warhammer Fantasy Battle players, Lord of the Rings players commonly collect and paint one army (or more) of their choice and find opponents (with similarly collected armies) to play against. Armies can be built up from through the purchase of boxed sets (usually having 10 or 12 plastic miniatures in each) or "blister packs" (usually containing no more than four finely detailed metal or resin miniatures) to build up a reasonable-sized fighting force. Others simply collect the miniatures because they like the way they look. One popular way of collecting was through Battle Games in Middle-earth — a De Agostini magazine that came with one or more free miniatures (some of which were initially exclusive to the publication) and contained detailed hobby guides.

As such, there are a wide variety of miniatures in the ever-growing range, including promotional miniatures, such as "Gimli on Dead Uruk-hai". Games Workshop began to discontinue some of their metal miniatures, so that they could replace them with plastic miniatures. However, there was much complaint when they retired the popular "Boromir Captain of the White Tower" miniature, and it was later brought back into production.

There are a large number of differences from Warhammer in The Lord of the Rings Strategy Battle Game, which makes it unique and more realistic, accounting for its popularity as Games Workshop's third core system.

=== Modellers ===
Mixing parts from different models is a popular method of conversion (a converted Maeglin miniature ).

Since the models are hand-painted and assembled by the player, players are often encouraged to design their own paint schemes, such as colouring them differently and so on, as well as using the pre-designed ones displayed in the various books. They are also encouraged to further modify their miniatures using parts from other kits and models (known as "Bitz" to players), modelling putty, or whatever the modeller can scrounge up. These conversions are often entered into contests at sponsored tournaments and similar gaming events, such as the Golden Demon or the One Ring Awards.

Terrain is a very important part of play. Though Games Workshop makes terrain kits available, many hobbyists prefer to make their own elaborate and unique set pieces. Common household items and hobby materials such as balsa wood, cardboard, and polystyrene can be transformed into ruins from the Second Age, woodland terrain, or the rocky wild of Middle-earth with the addition of plastic card, putty, and a bit of patience and skill.

Dioramas, often depicting scenes from the film and books, bring terrain and conversion skills together. However, due to the licensing agreements between New Line Cinema and Games Workshop, pieces of models for the Lord of the Rings Strategy Battle Game are not allowed to be combined with other model lines for official tournaments or conversion awards. The same is true for pieces from other manufacturers.

== Current state of play ==
=== History and overview of rulesets ===
The Shadow and Flame Supplement - the first Games Workshop supplement to feature content that was not in the films.

As of September 2005, the rules for the Lord of the Rings Strategy Battle Game were in their fourth edition. The first three editions of the rulebooks were released with The Lord of the Rings films, but Games Workshop used the magazine White Dwarf and various supplements to "go beyond what is presented in the films of The Lord of the Rings and delve into the rich material of J. R. R. Tolkien's books." The fourth edition, The One Rulebook to Rule them All, contained the entire set of rules updated and presented in a single large volume, including those of previous supplements. The three older editions were re-released in updated supplements, while the compact Mines of Moria edition contains the updated rules only for what was shown in the films. In February 2012, preceding the release of The Hobbit movies, all of the characteristic profiles from the old sourcebooks and White Dwarf were condensed in 5 sourcebooks: Mordor, The Fallen Realms, Moria & Angmar, Kingdoms of Men, and The Free Peoples. These also contain minor edits to the rules as written in The One Rulebook to Rule them All. For around a decade, this remained the core rules system, with only minor changes through various supplements.

With the release of The Hobbit trilogy of films, the game was rebranded, a new rulebook with various changes was released, and supplements tying in to each of the films were released. The Hobbit theme performed less well than expected, reaching nowhere near the peak popularity seen during the original The Lord of the Rings trilogy release, when the game had been Games Workshop's most valuable property. The game gradually received less and less attention from Games Workshop as profits and interest dwindled.

After this period of decline, Games Workshop unexpectedly announced a revival of the game. A third rebrand, to no longer focus on The Hobbit, took place. The rules were reworked and republished in a new edition in 2018 (effectively the 5th edition), and all the profiles of all models were revised and collected in two books: Armies of The Lord of the Rings and Armies of The Hobbit, uniting the older and newer ranges of miniatures into the same system. A new starter box set, based on the climactic Battle of Pelennor Fields from The Return of the King, was designed and heavily promoted. This ushered in a new era for the game, with further, scenario-focused supplements following, significantly increased interest in the game, greater coverage of the game by Games Workshop, and cyclical rereleases of out-of-production miniatures. In December 2022 a new starter box centred around the Battle of Osgiliath was released.

In December 2024 a new edition of the game was released which introduced minor gameplay adjustments as well as new profiles for every character in the game. A new starter box centred around The War of the Rohirrim was released alongside.

Below is a list of all official editions of rulebooks and supplements released:

| Publication | Type | Year | Main content |
|---|---|---|---|
| The Fellowship of the Ring | Rulebook | 2001 | |
| The Two Towers | Rulebook | 2002 | |
| The Return of the King | Rulebook | 2003 | |
| Shadow and Flame | Supplement | 2003 | Rules for Dwarves, Tom Bombadil, the Barrow-wights, Glorfindel, and Elladan and Elrohir. |
| The Siege of Gondor | Supplement | 2003 | Rules for sieges and characters such the Citadel Guard, Beregond, and Gothmog. |
| The Battle of the Pelennor Fields | Supplement | 2004 | Rules for the Haradrim, Mûmakil, the Knights of Dol Amroth and the Dúnedain. |
| The Scouring of the Shire | Supplement | 2005 | Rules for smaller battles between the Hobbits and the agents of "Sharkey". |
| The One Rulebook | Rulebook | 2005 | |
| A Shadow in The East | Supplement | 2005 | Rules for Khamûl, Eorl, the Easterlings and the people of Khand. |
| The Fall of the Necromancer | Supplement | 2006 | Rules for Sauron (the "Necromancer"), the Elves of Mirkwood, and the White Council. |
| Legions of Middle-earth | Supplement | 2006 | The catalogue for the upcoming (not all released) models and new army lists. |
| The Ruin of Arnor | Supplement | 2007 | Rules for the armies of the declining northern Númenórean Realm and the rising Angmar. |
| Khazad-dûm | Supplement | 2007 | Rules for the Dwarves of Erebor and Khazad-dûm, and Dragons. Replaced the Shadow and Flame book. |
| Gondor in Flames | Supplement | 2007 | Rules for the armies of Elendil, Osgiliath, the fiefdoms of Gondor, and the Dead Men of Dunharrow. Replaced the Siege of Gondor book. |
| Harad | Supplement | 2008 | Rules for the Corsairs of Umbar and the entirely original Mahûd tribes of Far Harad. Replaced the Battle of the Pelenor Fields book. |
| Mordor | Supplement | 2008 | The supposed final supplement for the game. |
| War of the Ring | Rulebook | 2009 | |
| Kingdoms of Men | Supplement | 2012 | Rules for Gondor, Arnor, and Rohan, as well as minor updates to the rules. |
| The Free Peoples | Supplement | 2012 | Rules for Elves, Dwarves, Ents, Hobbits, the Fellowship of the Ring and the White Council plus minor updates to the rules. |
| Moria & Angmar | Supplement | 2012 | Rules for the forces of Moria and Angmar, plus minor updates to the rules. |
| Mordor | Supplement | 2012 | Rules for the forces of Mordor, plus minor updates to the rules. |
| The Fallen Realms | Supplement | 2012 | Rules for the forces of Isengard, Harad, Umbar, and the Eastern Kingdoms, plus minor updates to the rules. |
| The Hobbit: An Unexpected Journey | Rulebook | 2012 | Updated rules including new profiles for the forces of good and evil that appeared in the first of "The Hobbit" movies. |
| The Hobbit: The Desolation of Smaug | Supplement | 2013 | Rules, scenarios, and updated profiles. |
| The Hobbit: The Battle of the Five Armies | Supplement | 2014 | Rules, scenarios, and updated profiles. |
| The Hobbit: Motion Picture Trilogy - There and Back Again | Supplement | 2016 | Updated and new rules, scenarios, and profiles, many replacing those contained in the two prior Hobbit supplements. |
| Middle-earth: Strategy Battle Game | Rulebook | 2018 | Updated the main game system, replacing all prior rulesets. Included within the starter set Battle of Pelennor Fields. |
| Armies of Lord of the Rings | Supplement | 2018 | Updates the rules for all armies related to "The Lord of the Rings", discounting armies introduced in "The Hobbit" books |
| Armies of the Hobbit | Supplement | 2018 | Updates the rules for all armies introduced in "The Hobbit" books |
| Gondor at War | Supplement | 2019 | Rules, scenarios, and new profiles for armies involved in the war in Gondor during the third age. |
| Scouring of the Shire | Supplement | 2019 | Rules, scenarios, and new profiles for armies involved in the Scouring of the Shire as well as other battles that involved hobbits |
| War in Rohan | Supplement | 2019 | Rules, scenarios, and new profiles for armies involved in the war in Rohan during the third age as well as other historical battles involving the Horse Lords |
| Quest of the Ringbearer | Supplement | 2020 | Rules, scenarios, and new profiles for armies featuring in the journey of the Fellowship and the Ringbearer |
| Fall of the Necromancer | Supplement | 2021 | Rules, scenarios, and new profiles for armies involved with the rise and fall of Sauron in Mirkwood |
| Defence of the North | Supplement | 2022 | Rules, scenarios, and new profiles for armies involved in the war with Erebor, Dale, and the woodland realms of the Elves |
| Middle-earth: Strategy Battle Game | Rulebook | 2022 | Minor refresh of the 2018 rulebook to include all current errata. Included within the starter set Battle of Osgiliath. |
| Rise of Angmar | Supplement | 2024 | Rules, scenarios, and new profiles for armies involved in the war with Arnor and Angmar |
| Middle-earth Strategy Battle Game Rules Manual | Rulebook | 2024 | Replaces the 2018 and 2022 rulebooks with a completely revised ruleset. Included within the starter set The War of the Rohirrim - Battle for Edoras. |
| Armies of The Lord of the Rings | Supplement | 2024 | Updates the rules for all armies related to "The Lord of the Rings" and "The Lord of the Rings: The War of the Rohirrim" films. Unlike the 2018 edition, most armies and models that appear in the books but not the films are excluded. |
| Armies of The Hobbit | Supplement | 2024 | Updates the rules for all armies related to "The Hobbit" films. |
| Armies of Arnor and Angmar | Free PDF | 2024 | Updates the rules for Arnor and Angmar armies, including the models and legions that were released in the "Rise of Angmar" supplement at the end of the previous edition. Will be replaced by "Armies of Middle-earth". |
| Armies of Middle-earth | Supplement | 2025 | Updates the rules for all armies and models that appear in the books and lore but which are not included in the films. |
| Legacies of Middle-earth | Supplement | 2025 | Updates the rules for all armies and models that were moved to "Legacies" and are no longer supported for official GW tournaments. |
Legend: Current version of the ruleset required to play Supplements compatible with the existing ruleset

For materials done under the previous iteration of the rules, there exist errata and FAQ files, to ensure potential rules conflicts between editions are resolved universally.

In addition to the official rulesets, Games Workshop has also encouraged the writing of unofficial "house rules" by wargamers. As such, there have been a number of unofficial fan supplements and other supplementary material on the internet; the most notable of which was The Age of the King, made by The One Ring. Although some of its subject matter was later covered by official rulesets, it is still considered "the benchmark against which all others are measured". In many cases, supplements are written for areas where Games Workshop's licence does not extend, such as The Silmarillion.

==== Legions of Middle-earth ====
As of August 2006, Games Workshop released a new expansion entitled Legions of Middle-earth, centring on theming and army building. It is not a supplement or rulebook, as it contains no rules; instead, it provides army lists for players to theme their forces around, and scenarios which are designed to work in conjunction with them. However, Games Workshop also released supplement summaries online in conjunction with Legions of Middle-earth, so effectively a player only requires Legions of Middle-earth and the main rulebook in order to use the rules of the supplements. According to one review, the army lists would transform the game "from what has essentially been a scenario-based game that appealed mostly to collectors to a genuine tournament-compatible game system," although in this it "could have been a little bit more restrictive." Some of the miniatures for the point values listed have not yet been released; in this way, the book was not to become obsolete with future releases for some time.

==== Variants and derived games ====
All at Sea is an adaptation of the rules for naval conflicts. The official rules were a modified version of the Warhammer Boat rules, adapted by Nick Davis and first presented in Games Workshop's White Dwarf magazine (US issue 295). The game's mechanics centred on boarding parties, with options for ramming actions and naval artillery in the form of ballistae and other siege engines. Model ships are built by hobbyists, just as normal miniature terrain, such as "great ships" of Pelargir, cogs of Dol Amroth and Corsair galleys.

=== Game systems ===
The standard game is played with two or more armies on a board generally 4 feet long and 4 feet wide (16 square feet, or 1.486 square metres), usually deployed within 6 inches of opposite board edges. Similar to Warhammer Fantasy, the game uses a "points-system" to assign values to each miniature, allowing players to ensure that their armies are evenly matched. The game is primarily a skirmish game, but can be played in varying scale:

- Scenario - These are based on an event in the book or film, and the armies are predetermined and fought using Special Scenario-specific Rules.
- Points Match - These are played between two forces of equal size, generally of 500 Points each (which is usually no more than 50 miniatures per side).
- War Party - This is a stricter form of the Points Match, using forces of no more than 250 Points.
- Battle Company - This is an experience-based system which is played out with no more than 25 miniatures.

The turn-system game was played using four phases originally, but is now played using five under the current rules:

- Priority Phase - The players roll dice to see who gets to take their Turn first.
- Move Phase - The players move their miniatures (to a maximum distance that is usually 6 inches). "Magic" (e.g. "Compel") is also used during this phase.
- Shoot Phase - Missile-armed miniatures can shoot.
- Fight Phase - Dice are rolled for each group of miniatures in base contact with each other to see which wins the combat.
- End Phase - Reinforcements arrive, as well as general book-keeping

While the game is designed usually for play by only two players (as the force lists are divided into "Good" and "Evil"), very large battles (generally with more than 100 models each side) become easier to manage with multiple players working together on teams.

== Online community ==
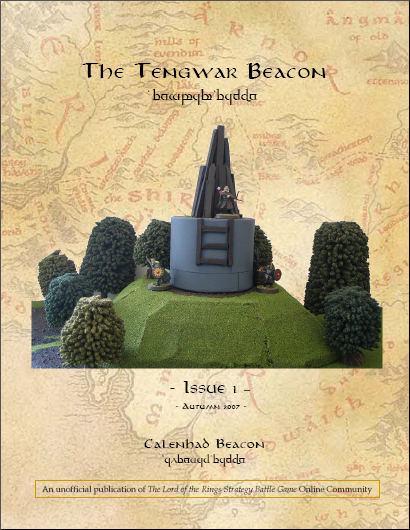
Cover of The Tengwar Beacon, a hobby magazine produced by the online community

Prior to the closure of Games Workshop's official forum in November 2006, the site had 3000 forum posts per day and well over 300,000 registered users. Since then, the online community has moved onto a large number of unofficial websites and forums for Lord of the Rings players, many of which were already in existence before the closure of Games Workshop's forums: these include "The Last Alliance", with over 6400 registered members (rebuilt in 2009 due to the host deleting their server for financial reasons), "The One-Ring", with over 5000, and "The Palantir", with over 2400 members. Collectively, the members of these websites have produced high-quality articles for the public, namely on The One-Ring, whose acceptance standards are very high, in greater quantity than on the official site, and White Dwarf has commented on the community as having a "huge wealth of material".

On 1 June 2005, Games Workshop launched their annual UK-based Worldwide Campaign under the name "The War of the Ring Online Campaign", featuring The Lord of the Rings for the first time. The campaign was deemed "a fantastic rollercoaster", with 3007 registered participants. Games Workshop also introduced the "Wrath of Umbar Roadshow", with custom-built Corsair models and gaming boards being brought to various cities in the United Kingdom. When the campaign formally ended on 8 September, Good emerged the victor. The combined total of the 14 weeks was 27,239 recorded wargames. The forum closed shortly after, giving way to a smaller Canada-based campaign with the same name.

Hobby websites have been key in organising sides in the Worldwide Campaigns, and indeed in creating their own campaigns and competitions, such as the "Campaign of LoTRs", a collaboration between the two websites "The Dark Council" and "Cheeseweb".

Another notable side of the community is the influence of its reaction to the company's products: many Tolkien purists, for example, reacted against the company's rendition of the Swan Knights of Dol Amroth, with some choosing to convert their own, impacting the hobby and the sales of the products. When Games Workshop subsequently showed the planned release of the Men-at-Arms of Dol Amroth, it was suggested that they had taken the response of the community into account.

== Reviews ==
- Envoyer #63
- Syfy ("The Fellowship of the Ring")
- Syfy ("The Two Towers")
