= Asgard Miniatures =

Manufacturer

Original company logo, 1977

Asgard Miniatures was a company that produced metal miniature figures beginning in the 1970s.

== History ==
Asgard Miniatures was founded by Bryan Ansell, Steven Fitzwater and Paul Sulley in 1976 in Nottingham. Ansell was an experienced sculptor, having previously worked at Conquest Miniatures. Originally the company was managed by Sulley, while Ansell and Nick Bibby created the sculpts, Garry Parsons created the moulds, and Jamie Sims cast the miniatures.

Asgard was a stepping stone for some noted sculptors, who started their careers with Asgard before moving to other companies; chief among these was lead designer and co-founder Bryan Ansell, who left Asgard in 1978 to form successful rival Citadel Miniatures with funding from Games Workshop. Others included Jes Goodwin, Nick Bibby, Tony Ackland and Rick Priestley.

By 1984, Asgard was struggling, but turned down an offer to merge with Citadel Miniatures. To modernize the packaging of their products from plastic bags stapled to cardboard cards that had been standard in the 1970s to the more up-to-date blister packages, Asgard merged with distributor Sanders International.

This was not enough to sustain the company, and when Asgard went out of business, their US rights were acquired by The Viking Forge, which still produces their fantasy miniatures. The UK rights were acquired first by Tabletop Games, and then Alternative Armies, which still produces several Asgard lines, including the Space Marines (SM line) and the Barbarian Personalities (BP line).

== Reception ==
In the September 1977 edition of White Dwarf (Issue 2), Ian Livingstone reviewed 15 Asgard figures, and stated that "Asgard use good quality alloy for the figures which do not bend [...] They are well-cast figures, requiring virtually no preparatory work before painting and it is good to see different-sized, rounded bases getting away from the traditional rectangular base."

In the August-September 1979 edition of White Dwarf (Issue 14), and again in the August-September edition (Issue 20), Asgard Miniatures were featured in the photographic feature titled "Molten Magic".

John T. Sapienza, Jr. reviewed the Dungeon Adventurers and Space Marines lines for Different Worlds magazine and stated that "With any luck, they will be 'discovered' by some of the U.S. importers the way Citadel was last year, and thus become available in the U.S."

In the May 1983 edition of Dragon (Issue 73), Kim Eastland called Asgard's Large Sadistic Demon line "Possibly the most creative line of monsters to come along in quite a while." Eastland complimented the "well-sculpted scaly hides", and concluded that these were "ideal for the gamer who wants to spring a little surprise on his fellow players."

In the July 1983 edition Dragon (Issue 75), Kim Eastland was impressed by Asgard's science fiction line, saying, "The present low supply of good SF figures is boosted by this gorgeous collection of space marines." He concluded "If you have a need for science-fiction warriors in futuristic armor, then Asgard is the place to 'hire' them from."

Mike Brunton reviewed Asgard Miniatures for Imagine magazine, and stated that "These figures are not easy to paint. They cry out for a comprehensive paint job that will bring out all the detail that has been lavished upon them. There they stand, all snarls and warpaint."

Mike Brunton reviewed Asgard's Miniature Barbarians and Dwarves for Imagine magazine, and stated that "These are a tour de force of the figure manufacturers' art, and I have to confess that they are not easy to paint - but quality is its own reward. Highly recommended."
