= The War of the Ring online campaign =

The promotional "Gimli on Dead Uruk-hai" miniature.

The War of the Ring was Games Workshop's annual summer campaign for 2005. The campaign was named after the eponymous War of the Ring in J. R. R. Tolkien's The Lord of the Rings, and was the first to feature The Lord of the Rings Strategy Battle Game as its wargaming system. The campaign allowed registered participants to play miniature wargames using special "regional rules" for any one of thirteen regions of Middle-earth, and to submit the results to the campaign website. The results were then added up on the website, contributing to the overall result of the campaign.

The campaign was launched on 1 June 2005 and lasted 14 weeks (or 92 days). There were 3007 registered participants, and 27239 games were submitted. Although based in the United Kingdom, the campaign was open to all countries and was promoted in Games Workshop hobby centres worldwide. The campaign also received coverage in the monthly magazine White Dwarf and the fortnightly Battle Games in Middle-earth, and Games Workshop released the special "Gimli on Dead Uruk-hai" miniature to promote the event.

== Campaign ==
=== Structure ===
The campaign system was designed by Mathew Ward. Based on the Lord of the Rings Strategy Battle Game, the only two sides were "Good" and "Evil", who contested thirteen regions set in Middle-earth: Eriador, Angmar, Iron Hills, Mirkwood, Misty Mountains, Dunland & Isengard, Lothlórien & Fangorn, Rohan, Rhûn, Gondor, Mordor, Harad and the Fellowship Path. Each day, registered participants could submit the results of a tabletop battle-game played using special "regional rules" for any one of these regions. The website's "War Room" was updated each weekday at 10:00 GMT, and showed where each side was leading. At the end of each week, the wins would be tallied and "Victory Points" would be awarded to each side to determine who was winning over all.

There was also an internet forum for each side on the website, where participants could discuss strategies for swinging the regions in their side's favour. These were moderated by Steve Hammatt, who was at the time forum moderator on the main Games Workshop website. Hammatt assisted the running of the campaign both by making announcements and answering player's questions, and by passing on player feedback to the campaign organisers. There were also two "player created strategy groups" formed mid-campaign, the Alliance of Light and the Dark Council, who received particular mention and thanks from Games Workshop in White Dwarf.

Games Workshop also introduced the "Wrath of Umbar" Roadshow, with custom-built corsair models and gaming boards being brought to various cities in the United Kingdom.

=== Progress of the campaign ===
The map of Middle-earth used for recording battles in the "War Room"

The campaign started with what was later called "a solid series of victories for Good", insofar as Harad was the only region to remain under Evil control at the end of the first week. It was worried that the campaign was going to be a walkover, but the Evil side clawed their way back and took many of Good's most strongly held regions. Rohan, a "seemingly impregnable" stronghold for the Good side, had "an interesting few weeks where everyone piled in their results": over 600 games were entered in Week 8 alone causing it to swing unexpectedly to the Evil side. In particular, the Dark Council directed the forces of Evil and was noted at the time for "playing like professionals".

The number of miniature wargames played in a single week peaked at the end of Week 9, with both sides submitting approximately 1400 victories each. At the end of Week 11, Evil came to within two points of the Good side. In Week 14, the last events of the Wrath of Umbar Roadshow were run in Sheffield, Liverpool, Shrewsbury, Croydon and Ipswich; while the week was also characterised by "spectacular results" for Good in Mordor and Morannon. The outcome was a narrow overall victory of 145 Victory Points for Good and 142 for Evil.

=== Results ===
At the end of the campaign, there were 3007 registered participants, while results from a total of 27239 battle games played were submitted. Gondor was the most popular region for input, with 10327 games recorded. The highest peak of any region in a single week was an attempt to take Rohan from Evil in Week 9, with the results of over 650 tabletop games submitted. There was also an unprecedented rush for Good to retake Mordor in the final week, with Mordor and the Fellowship Path attracting the most games in that period.

When the Campaign formally ended on 8 September, there were 27239 games recorded in total. The Iron Hills had remained an undefeated stronghold for Good, with 67% of games there being Good victories. Evil's strongest bastion was in Angmar, with 59% of games being Evil victories. Good had emerged the victor with 145 Victory Points (Evil had 142).

== Aftermath ==
The campaign received a positive response, both in participation and comments by mail. Alessio Cavatore, one of the designers of The Lord of the Rings Strategy Battle Game and a contributor to White Dwarf, described the campaign as a "fantastic rollercoaster", with a "perfect ending" in a "highly climatic [sic], breathtaking, neck-and-neck result!"

Later in 2005, Games Workshop ran a similar, smaller War of the Ring campaign based in Canada. However, this was nowhere near the scale of its UK counterpart (with only 100 games recorded in Gondor, for example) and was ignored by many who viewed it as a "watered-down" version of the original. In December, Alessio Cavatore hinted that Games Workshop might eventually run another online campaign for The Lord of the Rings:

As soon as we have recovered and rested a bit, we'll certainly be making plans, and who knows what the future holds? Some other Captain may come forward to lead the armies of Evil against the Free Peoples, and Middle-earth will face another dire threat!

There has been no official sequel event to date. However, the Dark Council went on to run an unofficial "Campaign of LoTRs" with Cheeseweb; while a campaign was run by The Last Alliance website and another was in development on The One Ring. The Dark Council itself was ultimately closed in summer 2007 after a long period inactivity.
