= Veritone Minimum Phase Speakers =

Defunct speaker manufacturing company

VMPS
- Founded: January 1977
- Defunct: December, 2012
- Headquarters: VMPS was based in El Sobrante, California
- Key people: Brian Cheney, founder
- Products: Loudspeakers
- Website: vmpsaudio.com

Veritone Minimum Phase Speakers, or VMPS, was a loudspeaker manufacturer founded in 1977 by speaker designer Brian Cheney. Many VMPS speakers received favorable reviews from audio critics, such as the RM40, which was awarded Best of CES in the High-End Audio category in 2002. VMPS was in operation for over 35 years, from January 1977 to December 2012, when it closed soon after the death of company owner Brian Cheney on December 7, 2012.

== Design ==
The VMPS speakers employed phase coherent drivers (for best stereo imaging) by employing first-order "minimum phase" filters and drivers wired electrically in-phase. Such first-order filter designs typically do not provide full low-frequency attenuation for mid-range and tweeters. Speaker designer Brian Cheney viewed high-order filters as undesirable since they were not "minimum phase", meaning their phase response was not flat with frequency. He also avoided high-order filters because he believed they often required drivers be wired electrically out-of-phase and, in his opinion, had inferior stereo imaging.

Brian also believed direct measurements should not play a significant role in the design process or evaluation of a loudspeaker. Instead, speakers should be designed and evaluated based on how they sounded. In this sense, VMPS speakers did not follow a conventional design philosophy which strived for a "flat" frequency response within a set tolerance, e.g. ±2.5 dB. In Brian's belief, most listeners could tolerate moderate fluctuations in frequency response. Furthermore, such measurements performed in the laboratory (anechoic chamber) were a poor representation of the customer's listening environment, meaning a speaker that "measured flat" in the laboratory would likely never measure flat in the customer's home. Thus, he felt that flat frequency response was both unnecessary and practically impossible to achieve, unlike the vast majority of other speaker designers throughout audio history.

Brian approached speaker design like a musician, using his ear for primary feedback. Minimum phase filters and drivers wired in-phase were used because they sounded the best. This philosophy was directly expressed in the name of his company: Veritone Minimum Phase Speakers, which taken literally means: variable tone (or frequency) minimum phase distortion speakers (drivers wired in-phase with linear phase response). The choice of term "tone" (musician's terminology) over the term "frequency" (scientist's terminology) also may have expressed his belief that the musical characteristic of the speaker was more important than scientific measurement.

The most recent VMPS speakers were a three-way design that featured ribbon drivers for the mid-range and tweeter. The high bandwidth of the mid-range "Neopanel" complemented the use of first-order filters. Woofers were used for bass and mid-bass, along with a passive radiator or port for the 626 bookshelf model. The "RM" in the speaker name (e.g. RM40) stood for "Ribbon Monitor". The RM40, RM/X, 626, RM30, RM-V60, and RM-50, all used a "Neopanel" mid-range, and a modified Aurum Cantus ribbon tweeter, except for the RM50, which used a Beston ribbon tweeter. Woofers had woven carbon fiber cones and phase-plugs. The VMPS bass management system used one or more high-compliance down-firing passive radiators that was tunable by adding or removing putty from the diaphragm.

Passive radiator mass tuning, along with level controls for mid-range and treble on the rear of the speaker, allowed the listener to tune the sound of the speaker to their listening room and personal preference. Tuning of VMPS speakers was time-consuming to achieve optimal sound and required some experience. Brian Cheney would frequently visit a customer's home, often at his own expense, to optimize the sound of the speaker system in the listening environment.

=== Neopanel ===
The mid-range "Neopanel" is 2.5 in × 7 in (64 mm × 178 mm) planar diaphragm (ribbon) using a push-pull motor with neodymium magnets. The Neopanel in the VMPS speakers is used with a first-order filter between 220 Hz and 7 kHz. The Neoplanel was originally designed by Bruce Thigpen. This design was licensed to Level 9 and manufactured in Canada and later China and sold as Monsoon computer speakers with a subwoofer. Brian Cheney stated he modified these panels to fix a mechanical flaw that made them unreliable.

=== Constant Directivity Wave Guide ===
Brian Cheney invented and patented a Constant Directivity Wave Guide (CDWG) to increase the horizontal dispersion of the planar mid-range and tweeter. The first generation CDWG was attached like a speaker grill to the RM30 and RM40 speakers. The CDWG consisted of an aperture (slit) with sound absorbing foam between the CDWG grill and front baffle. A second generation CDWG placed the CDWG aperture directly on the face of the Neopanel and ribbon tweeter.

=== Bass Management System ===
Most VMPS speakers incorporated one or more passive radiators (PR). To achieve optimal sound quality, the set-up process required the listener change the mass of the PR by adding or removing Mortite putty from the cone. This process changed the resonant frequency and "Q" of the PR and dramatically affected the sound of the bass. This allowed the listener to change the overall tonal characteristic of the bass and to compensate for the bass response of the particular listening environment.

VMPS's passive radiators used a unique high-compliance suspension and a low moving mass diaphragm to achieve a low resonant frequency. The low moving mass reduced the gravity sag of the PR cone and allowed it to be mounted on the bottom of the speaker cabinet and fire downward in a loaded slot. The slot acted as a low-pass filter to remove unwanted high-frequency sound generated by the PR cone. The low mass of the PR also meant it was very sensitive to small changes to the amount of putty (mass) on the cone.

=== Level Controls ===
On the rear of speaker cabinet, VMPS speakers included level controls to attenuate the sound level of the mid-range and treble (tweeter). These level controls were intended to be used in concert with PR mass tuning to achieve the desired overall tonal balance.

== Live versus recorded ==
VMPS conducted a series of live versus recorded demonstrations at CES using the RM-V60 and RM50 speakers.

The Live versus Recorded events led to dipole and bipole speakers designs (RM-V60 and RM-50) to better mimic the radiation pattern of live acoustic musical instruments.
