= Tung oil =

Oil from the seed of the tung tree

Names
- IUPAC name tung oil
- Other names China wood oil; lumbang oil; tung oil; tungmeal; tungoel

Identifiers
CAS Number	8001-20-5
ChemSpider	none
ECHA InfoCard	100.029.338
EC Number	232-272-3
UNII	3C8NM3A2P0
CompTox Dashboard (EPA)	DTXSID7029291

Properties
Density	0.937 g/ml at 25°C
Refractive index (n_{D})	1.52 (20°C)

Hazards
Flash point	>110°C
- Except where otherwise noted, data are given for materials in their standard state (at 25 °C [77 °F], 100 kPa). Infobox references

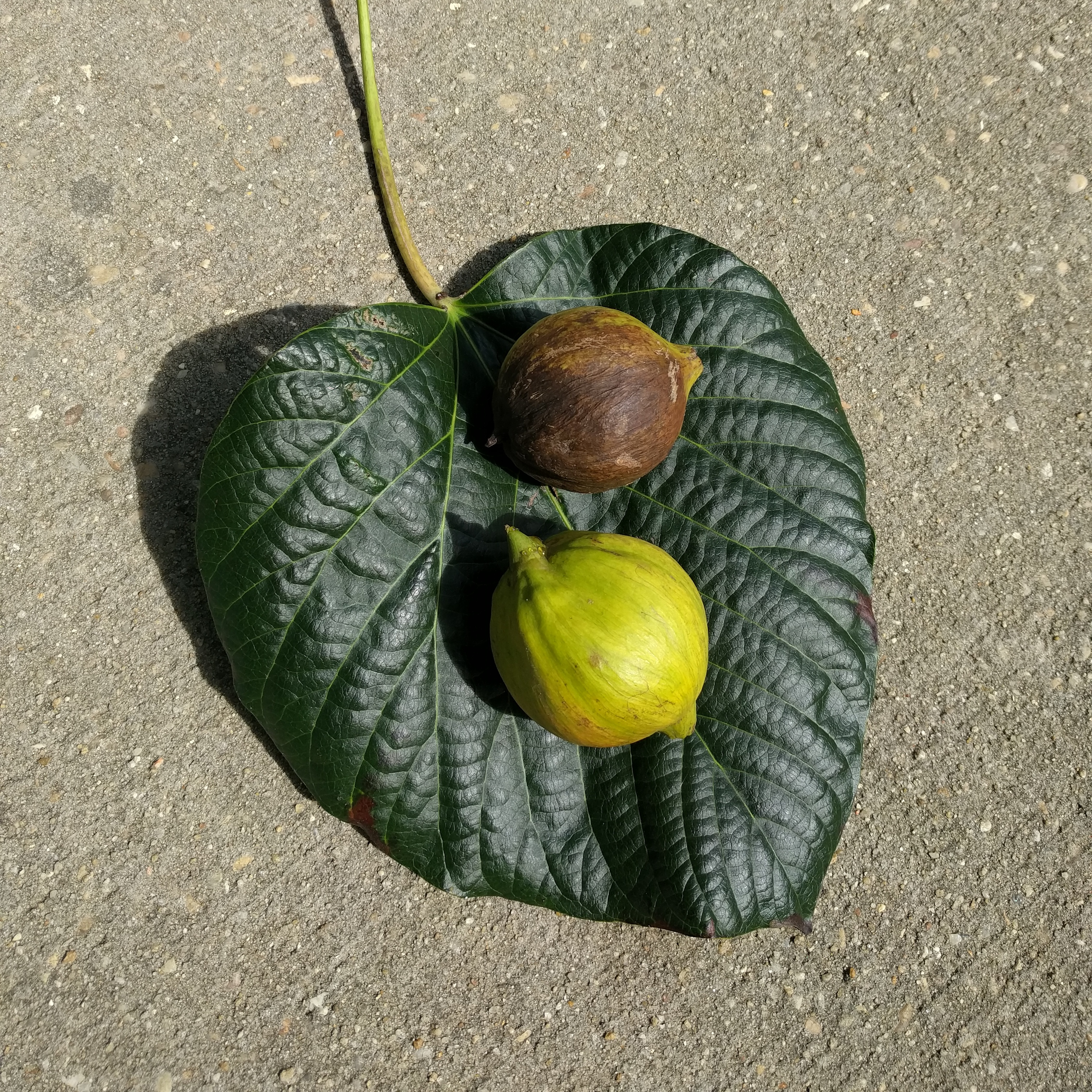
Tung tree leaf and fruit

Tung oil or China wood oil is a drying oil obtained by pressing the seed from the nut of the tung tree (Vernicia fordii). Tung oil hardens upon exposure to air (through polymerization), and the resulting coating is transparent and has a deep, almost wet look. Used mostly for finishing and protecting wood, after numerous coats, the finish can even look plastic-like. Related drying oils include linseed, safflower, poppy, and soybean oils. Raw tung oil tends to dry to a fine, wrinkled finish. This property was used to make wrinkle finishes, usually by adding excess cobalt drier. To prevent wrinkling, the oil is heated to gas-proof it (also known as "boiled").

Products marketed as "tung oil finish" are not necessarily pure tung oil. The term is also used for oil-varnish blends and wiping varnishes, which are chemically distinct from pure tung oil.

== History ==
The word "tung" is etymologically derived from the Chinese 桐 tóng. The tung oil tree originates in southern China and was cultivated there for tung oil, but the date of cultivation remains unknown. The earliest references for Chinese use of tung oil are in the writings of Confucius (551–479 BCE) around 500 to 479 BC.

During the Song dynasty (960–1279), tung oil and mixtures containing it was used for waterproofing on ships. Marco Polo wrote in the 13th century "The Chinese take some lime and chopped hemp, and these they knead together with a certain wood oil; and when the three are thoroughly amalgamated they hold like any glue, and with this mixture they paint their ships". This putty, known as Tung putty (桐油灰, lit. "tung oil ash") is a pounded mixture of lime or calcined oyster shells, raw tung oil, and coir or hemp, which is still commonly used to seal the seams of traditional wooden boats and various waterproofing or caulking tasks in building construction, from sealing plumbing joints to roofs seams.

== Composition ==
Fatty acid composition of tung oil
Alpha-eleostearic acid	82.0%
Linoleic acid	8.5%
Palmitic acid	5.5%
Oleic acid	4.0%

The primary constituent is a fatty acid with a chain of 18 linked carbon atoms or methylene units containing three conjugated double bonds. They are especially sensitive to autoxidation, which encourages cross linking of neighbouring chains, hence hardening of the base resin.

== Uses ==
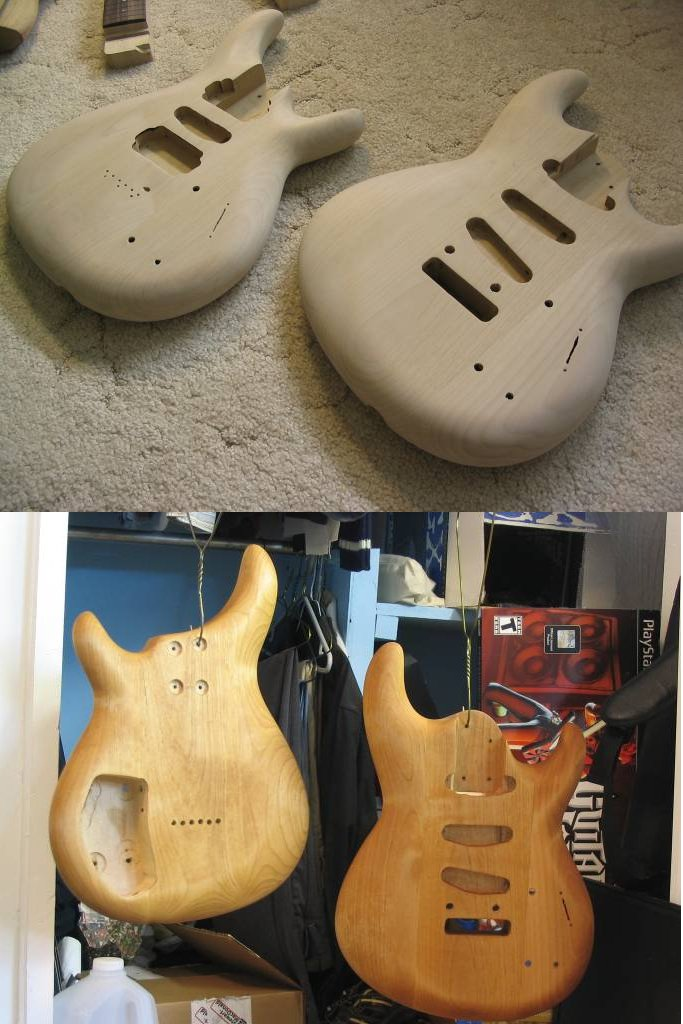
Showing the golden effect of polymerized tung oil versus bare wood

Tung oil is a common traditional wood finish, used typically for two main properties: first, it is a naturally derived substance. Second, after it cures (5 to 30 days, depending on weather/temperature), the result is a very hard and easily repaired finish, so it is used on boat decks and now on floors. The oil is often diluted with hydrocarbon thinner so its viscosity is very low and enables the oil to penetrate the finest grain woods. This thinning vehicle evaporates in 15 to 20 minutes. When applied in many fine/thinner coats over wood, tung oil slowly cures to a matte/light satin look with slight golden tint. Tung oil resists water better than any other pure oil finish and does not darken noticeably with age. It is claimed to be less susceptible to mould than linseed oil. It is considered safe to be used on sculptures made near waterways.

Heating tung oil to about 500 °F (260 °C) in an oxygen-free environment will substantially increase the viscosity and film-forming quality of the product. Most polymerized tung oils are sold mixed with mineral spirits to make them easier to work with. Limonene and D-limonene are less toxic alternatives for mineral spirits.

The oil-paper umbrella is the traditional umbrella used in China, Japan, and other countries in the East Asian cultural sphere, and was brought to Western countries through the Silk Road. Tung oil is the "oil" mentioned in the oil-paper umbrella, which is used to protect the paper from getting wet, and to make the umbrella waterproof.

== Application ==
The traditional technique for applying pure tung oil is to dilute the oil 1:1 with solvent, then apply a succession of very thin films with a soft, lint-free cloth such as tee-shirt cotton. Diluents range from traditional spirits of turpentine to any of the new citrus-based thinners to naphtha. The choice of thinner should be guided by how fast the coating needs to set. Naphtha works well in spray-on applications in well-ventilated studios. Primary coats may be laid down at a 1:1 oil-to-thinner ratio, and successive layers, if not absorbed into the wood, at higher solvent to oil concentrations. This technique brings out the deepest color of the wood while maintaining a matte finish.

Tung oil finishes that start with polymerized oils or tung oil preparations are best applied in the fat over lean principle: thinned pure oil is applied to deeply penetrate the surface, to fill pores. Straight oil is then applied moderately to adhere to the surface and provide a good base for the thick gloss layers. The polymerized oil is then applied thickly as a single layer, allowed to fully dry, buffed smooth with very fine sandpaper and 0000 steel wool. The surface is wiped clean with a moistened rag and allowed to dry. A final coat is applied fairly thickly (the oil will smooth itself into a glass-like coating) and allowed to dry for two to three days.

=== Storage and fire safety ===
Pure tung oil oxidizes when exposed to air, and oil stored in an opened container may develop a surface skin. The skin can be removed and the remaining oil strained before use. When kept tightly sealed with minimal headspace, tung oil can remain usable for five years or longer. Slight thickening does not necessarily make it unusable, although oil that has become cloudy or gummy may no longer be suitable.

Rags, paper, and other porous materials saturated with tung oil can self-heat and undergo spontaneous combustion. The heat is generated by the exothermic oxidation of the drying oil as it cures, rather than by evaporation of an added solvent. Bunching or piling oil-soaked materials prevents the heat from dissipating and increases the risk of ignition. The hazard also applies to pure tung oil without added solvent.
