= Tung putty =

Waterproof putty made from tung oil

Tung putty (桐油灰, lit. "tung oil ash") or Tung oil putty is a fibrous putty composed of tung oil, lime, and plant fibres, which is used to caulk and provide waterproof seals to items that will be exposed to high humidity or water.

It was used in the traditional construction of Chinese wooden boats and ships, and also commonly used material in modern construction of houses in many Chinese cultures. Tung putty can be used also as an adhesive or sealant for cracks and chips in furniture, wooden items, and ceramics.

== Description ==
Tung putty is traditional waterproof sealant made by combining and pounding a mixture consisting of three components:

- Tung oil extracted from the nut of the tung tree (Vernicia fordii) in either its "raw" (生), unprocessed form or also "boiled" (熟) to improve polymerization/drying speed.
- Lime from calcined limestone or oyster shells.
- Plant fibres, which consisted traditionally of pounded and chopped hemp, ramie, bamboo, or coir, but occasionally straw.

Certain recipes also include cooked glutinous rice and Traditional Chinese herbs for adhesion and as preservative.

== Uses ==
The putty was traditionally used to seal the seams and holes in traditional Chinese wooden boats hull and decks to make them seaworthy. Loose hemp or coir rope were coated with putty wetted with more tung oil, and then pounded into the seams with a caulking iron or pointing tool, and then sealed with more of the tung putty. These seams on the ship hulls were filled flush with the putty. For smaller holes and gaps, the putty is applied directly.

It is also still commonly used in applications where tough waterproof seals are required, be it in woodworking for filling gaps in furniture and for caulking tasks in building construction, from sealing plumbing joints to roofs seams.

Prior to the introduction of modern ceramic sealants, tung putty was commonly used as a food-safe adhesive to glue back chips and cracks on ceramic pottery.

== History ==
During the Song dynasty (960–1279), tung putty mixtures and tung oil were used for the waterproof caulking of hulls and decks on ships. Marco Polo wrote in the 13th century "The Chinese take some lime and chopped hemp, and these they knead together with a certain wood oil; and when the three are thoroughly amalgamated they hold like any glue, and with this mixture they paint their ships".

== See also ==
- Plumber's putty
- Wood putty
