= Rope caulk =

Type of putty

Rope caulk or caulking cord is a type of pliable putty or caulking formed into a rope-like shape. It is typically off-white in color, relatively odorless, and stays pliable for an extended period of time.

Rope caulk can be used as caulking or weatherstripping around conventional windows installed in conventional wooden or metal frames (see glazing). It is also used as a form for epoxy work, since epoxy does not adhere to this material.

Rope caulk has also been applied to the metallic structure supporting the magnet for a dynamic speaker to cut unwanted resonance of the metal structure, leading to improved speaker performance. It has also been used as a sonic damping material in sensitive phonograph components.

== History ==
Mortite brand rope caulk was introduced by the J.W. Mortell Co. of Kankakee, Illinois in the 1940s, and called "pliable plastic tape". The trademark application was filed in March, 1943. It was later marketed as "caulking cord". The company was later acquired by Thermwell Products.

== Mortite ==
Mortite caulking cord is a brand of rope caulk marketed under the Frost King brand. According to the manufacturer's safety data sheet, Mortite caulking cord is primarily composed of non-hazardous materials and binders, with titanium dioxide making up less than 0.9% of the total product weight as a minor pigment. It is listed by the state of California as containing ingredients known to the state to cause cancer or adversely affect reproductive health (a "P65 Warning").
