= Alan and Michael Perry =

British designers of miniatures

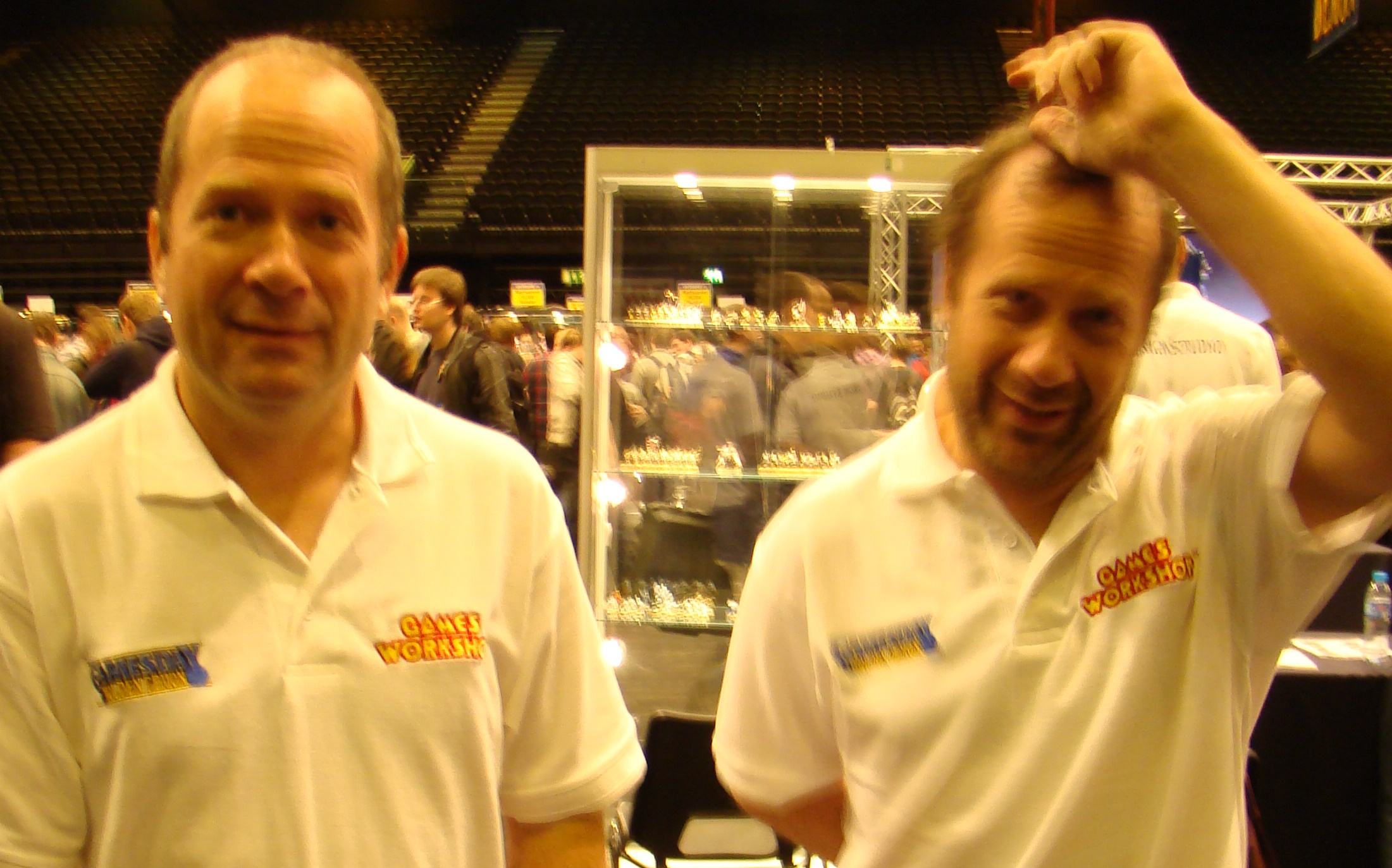
- Alan and Michael Perry at UK Gamesday 2011
- Born: Alan and Michael Perry; 1961 (age 64–65); Enfield, United Kingdom
- Occupations: Designers and Sculptors
- Years active: 1977/8–present
- Website: http://www.perry-miniatures.com/

Alan and Michael Perry (born 1961) are former Citadel Miniatures designers, and two of the most renowned and prolific sculptors for the miniature wargaming hobby. They worked for Games Workshop from 1978 until 2014, and during that time worked on most of the company's miniature ranges.

In addition, they were former sculptors for Wargames Foundry, helped found Warhammer Historical Wargames and now run the company Perry Miniatures, for which they produce historical miniatures. They have also taken part in reenactments of historical battles and have illustrated a number of books on military history for Osprey Publishing. They currently live in Nottingham, England.

== Life ==
Alan and Michael are twin brothers, sometimes referred to either as the Perry Brothers or the Perry Twins, who were born in 1961 and brought up in North London. They have played wargames since the age of 10, and are avid collectors of antique armour, weapons and other militaria. They studied art at A-levels, and started sculpting freelance for Citadel Miniatures in 1978, while still in school. They joined the company in 1980, and were the longest-serving members of the Games Workshop Design Studio.

The pair have "a passion for Military History and love to recreate it;" they were members of Sir Marmadaduke Rawdon's Regiment of Foote, which is a Royalist foot regiment of the King's Army, part of the British historical re-enactment group, the English Civil War Society. They have also belonged to other re-enactment groups. With the help of their friend John Stallard, they published an actual-size, full colour facsimile of a unique officer's handbook, The Art of Martial Discipline, which had been in their collection for some years.

Aside from facial hair they look virtually identical, except that Michael lost part of his right arm in 1996, following an accident loading a reproduction cannon during a re-enactment of the Battle of Crécy in France. This was a very serious injury for a right-handed model sculptor and illustrator, but he learned to sculpt and paint with his left hand.

They founded the company Warhammer Historical with a number of colleagues from Games Workshop, collaborated on the first four books of Warhammer Historical with Jervis Johnson and Rick Priestley, and have said that they "try and fit in a historical game when ever we can." Their own company, Perry Miniatures, currently produces 12 ranges on different historical themes: Samurai, American War of Independence, Agincourt to Orleans, Border Reivers, English Civil War, Napoleonic Wars, The Crusades, etc. In all, their miniatures are covered by hundreds of commercial rulesets. They have also sculpted a range of 54mm World War I ANZACs for the Gallipoli Campaign for Peter Jackson's private collection.

They have also served as illustrators for Osprey Publishing. Alan has illustrated books on Rorke's Drift and the American Civil War, while Michael has specialised in Chinese subjects such as the Taiping Rebellion of the 19th century. According to the Osprey website, Alan's interest in World War II has led him recently to buy a Stuart Light Tank (M3A1).

Both are now married and live in Nottingham, England.

== The Lord of the Rings ==
The limited edition "Gimli on Dead Uruk-hai" miniature, sculpted by Michael Perry.

They have described the illustrator John Howe as an "old friend", and share an interest in miniature wargaming and military history with The Lord of the Rings film director Peter Jackson.

They also had a cameo appearance in The Return of the King film as Rohirrim at the Battle of the Pelennor Fields, alongside Games Workshop designers Alessio Cavatore and Brian Nelson. They can be seen near the Mumakil Peregrin Took goes searching for Meriadoc Brandybuck among the debris from the battle, and are also on the base of Games Workshop's Mûmak miniature.

Alan and Michael Perry were "heavily involved in every The Lord of The Rings project that Games Workshop has undertaken". They expressed excitement when they were first asked, as it would allow them to "work on more true-to-life proportioned figures which is what we prefer." As with their sculpting for other miniature ranges, they always work on sculpting miniatures separately and "only occasionally combine on plastic projects."

=== Illustrated ===
- Ian Heath; Michael Perry (1994). The Taiping Rebellion: 1851–66. Osprey Publishing. ISBN 978-1-85532-346-9.
- Chris J. Peers; Michael Perry (1995). Imperial Chinese Armies: 200 BC-AD 589. Osprey Publishing. ISBN 978-1-85532-514-2.
- Chris J. Peers; Michael Perry (1996). Imperial Chinese Armies (2): 590-1260 AD. Osprey Publishing. ISBN 978-1-85532-599-9.
- Ian Knight (1996). Rorke's Drift 1879: 'Pinned Like Rats in a Hole'. Osprey Publishing. ISBN 978-1-85532-506-7.
- James R. Arnold; Carl Smith; Alan Perry (1998). Shiloh 1862: The Death of Innocence. Osprey Publishing. ISBN 978-1-85532-606-4.
- Ian Heath; Michael Perry (1999). The North-East Frontier: 1837–1901. Osprey Publishing. ISBN 978-1-85532-762-7.
- Peter Harrington; Alan Perry; David Chandler; Michael Perry (2001). Peking 1900: The Boxer Rebellion. Osprey Publishing. ISBN 978-1-84176-181-7.
- Ian Heath; Michael Perry (2005). The Sikh Army: 1799–1849. Osprey Publishing. ISBN 978-1-84176-777-2.

== See also ==
- Miniature figure
