= Static grass =

A sample of static grass applied using a converted electric fly swatter to provide the static charge.

Static grass is used in scale models and miniatures to create realistic-looking grass textures. It consists of small coloured fibres charged with static electricity, making them stand on end when sprinkled onto a surface coated with glue that then hardens, holding the fibres in place.

Static grass is usually prepared by applying a layer of glue on the surface, then pouring the fibres on and tipping off the excess. The fibres can also be applied with a shaker, also known as a puffer.

Static grass consists of man-made fibres selected for their ability to hold a static electric charge. They are usually a blend of coloured nylon, rayon, or polyester fibres that are used to more realistically replicate grass on a modeller's layout. The fibres are usually sold by weight in 2, 4, 6, 10 and 12 millimetre lengths, although fibres can be found from as little as 0.5 mm in length.

If using an electronic applicator, the fibres are attracted to the adhesive vertically and "end-on", giving the grass-like effect the modeller requires.

The application sequence is as follows:

- Apply adhesive to the area to be covered with grass;
- Ground the applicator to the adhesive area;
- Load the applicator with fibres;
- Apply the fibres;
- Allow the adhesive to dry;
- Remove excess fibres.

Once the basic technique is mastered, advanced techniques can be learned, such as developing differing lengths, dead grass and creating grass tufts, to enhance realism.

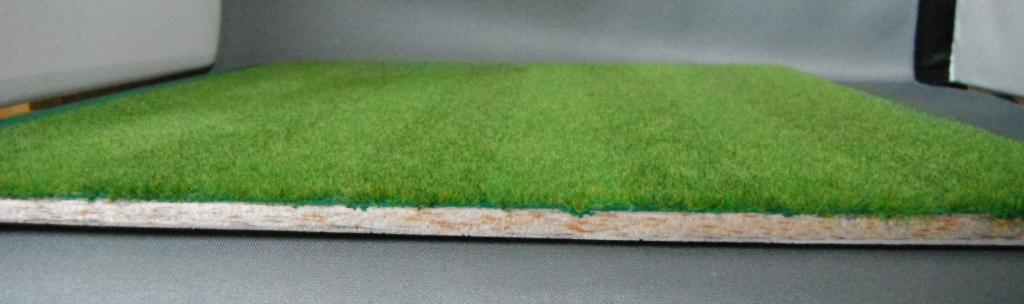
Static grass as a doll house lawn.

Several companies produce static grass products, including PECO, Woodland Scenics, Green Stuff World and WW Scenics.

== See also ==
- Rail transport modelling#Scatter (modeling)), alternative that may be just dyed sawdust
