= Pinning (modelling) =

Pinning is a technique used when assembling large or heavy model kits (such as metal wargaming miniatures) that involves drilling a hole in two pieces of the model to be joined, and using a "pin" to strengthen the bond when they are glued. Pinning is a useful technique for reinforcing joints and is essential when making models from parts that were not designed to go together, such as a miniature conversion.

While models that are used for display purposes do not often require pinning, heavy models that are frequently handled (such as large metal miniatures used for wargaming) will often benefit from pinning to ensure that the model does not come apart.

Some modellers also use Blu Tack or another temporary adhesive as an aid when pinning.
