= Pratley Putty =

South African epoxy adhesive invented in the 1960s

- Product type: Epoxy adhesive
- Current owner: Pratley, South Africa
- Produced by: Pratley, South Africa
- Introduced: 1960s
- Website: www.pratley.com

Pratley Putty is an epoxy putty adhesive. It was invented in the 1960s by South African George Montague Pratley, with the assistance of chemist Frank Robinson. It is produced by adhesive manufacturer Pratley.

== History ==
According to the manufacturer's official history, "The product was developed as an insulator and also as an adhesive agent for fixing brass terminals which were located inside cast iron junction boxes". As time went by, many other uses were found for the putty, which enabled it to penetrate both the consumer, industrial, and mining markets.

This versatile epoxy putty, originally called "Pratley Plastic Putty", was the first of its kind in the world and was used on the Ranger spacecraft that went to the moon in the mid 1960s. This earned the product the distinction of being the only South African product to have gone to the moon. It has also been used on a repair job for the Golden Gate Bridge in San Francisco. In South Africa, the holes in two partially sunken ships were repaired with Pratley Putty, which can also cure under water.

In 2019 Pratley Putty became a part of the SA Mint's "South African inventions" commemorative coin series, commemorating its use in space.

== Related Products ==
Today the company also produces a fast-curing version of Pratley Putty called Pratley Quickset® Putty as well as a metallic-looking version called Pratley Steel Putty. Other products produced are epoxy, acrylic, cyanoacrylate, silicone, anaerobic and proprietary hybrid adhesives.
