= Epoxy putty =

Space-filling adhesive

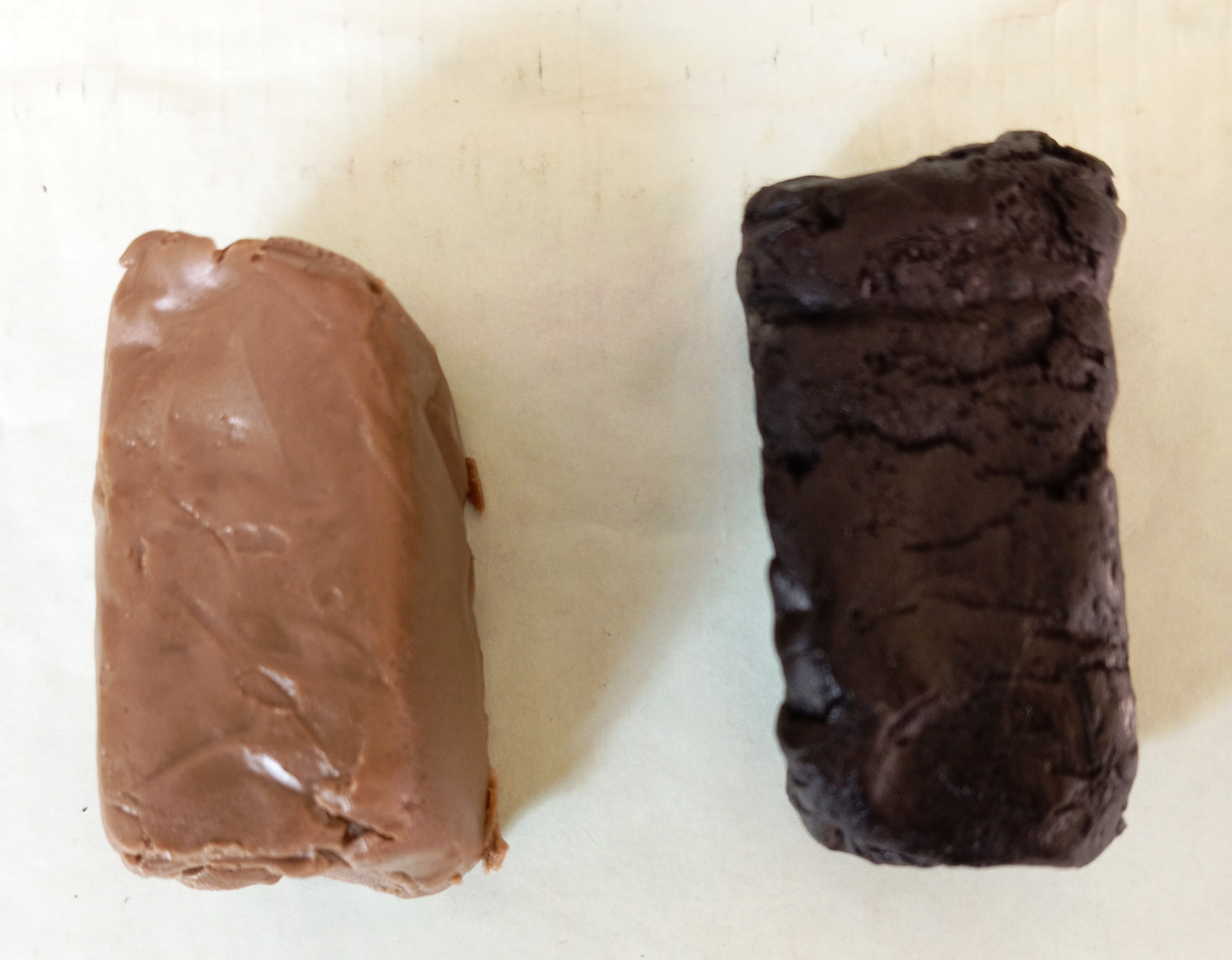
The left component is epoxy base resin and the right one is hardener. Both are to be mixed thoroughly in equal quantity to get epoxy putty.

Epoxy putty refers to a group of room-temperature-hardening substances used as space-filling adhesives. Exact compositions vary according to manufacturer and application.

Epoxy putty, once hardened, is a thermosetting polymer, so it will retain its shape rather than melting when heated. It was first developed for commercial use in the 1940s.

Epoxy putties are stored until used as two components of clay-like consistency. Kneading the two components into each other creates an exothermic chemical reaction that activates the substance for use by catalysing an epoxide polymerisation reaction. Unlike many other types of glues, an epoxy adhesive can fill gaps, and even be moulded into a structural part. Some makers claim in advertising that one can drill and tap their cured products and that they quickly cure "hard as steel" (as measured by Shore rating), though they are much weaker than steel in tensile strength and shear strength.

Epoxy putty is commonly used to repair basic damage to the blades of wind turbines. It is also often used by miniature modelers, and sculptors. Modelers use it to join disparate parts into a whole with the joins covered by moulded putty, often shaped into protrusions or textures to match their surroundings. The most common variety of epoxy putty used in modelling has its component clays coloured yellow and blue, respectively, and the mixed, hardened end product is green. This has given rise to the colloquial name green stuff for epoxy putty.

== See also ==
- Putty
- Milliput
- Pratley Putty
