= Milliput =

Brand of epoxy putty

Milliput is a UK-based brand of epoxy putty used by modellers, and also for household and restoration applications. Created in 1968 by Jack and Lena Rickman, Milliput was initially marketed for use in DIY and car body repair projects. In 1970, the company realised that the material was used to sculpt models, and started to steer their product towards the modelling market.

== Content ==
Miliput contains a high concentration (60-100%) of Bisphenol A.

== Use ==
Milliput is available in six different types, which have different colours; it can, however, it can be painted with various kinds of paint. Each package contains two separate bars, one of which is a hardener. Upon mixing an equal quantity of each different bar the material starts to harden, and hardens fully in 24 hours, after which it can be carved, sanded, drilled and sculpted. The product can be used for sculpture, making and repairing miniature models, restoring porcelain and other clay pots, plugging holes or rotted areas in engines and boats, plumbing and other applications.
