= Miniature conversion =

Miniature conversion refers to the practice of altering the appearance of a miniature or model so as to deviate from the standard version purchased in a boxed set.

This practice is quite common amongst hobbyists who play miniature wargames such as Games Workshop's The Lord of the Rings Strategy Battle Game, Warhammer Fantasy Battles and Warhammer 40,000, as well as many of the other games produced by other games and miniature manufacturers. In these circumstances, conversions generally consist of combining parts of different models and modelling putty (such as Milliput or Kneadatite also known as "Green Stuff") to produce a new model with a unique appearance, which is generally a centrepiece of the player's collection, representing a powerful character or monster, or similar.

== Reasons for conversions ==
There are many reasons why a hobbyist might want to convert or "model" miniature models. Hobbyists commonly use any combination of conversion techniques to provide models of their own unique design, models that are unavailable, or models that are not covered by regular miniature wargame rules. Sometimes hobbyists are forced to convert their miniatures to stay in line with the rules for their army (e.g., weapon changes or mounting miniatures on steeds).

Some people spend more time converting their miniatures than painting them or playing the actual game, and some hobbyists extensively convert every model in their army so that they can have a unique force. Some hobbyists will convert a model not for their army, but just as a way to clean out their "bits box" and to have fun. This allows the modeler to try out different (but similar) uniforms for different types of soldier, and to possibly show-case them to encourage this specific conversion. Some modelers (Online) will give instructions to converting specific types of figures.

== Tools and materials ==
=== Knife ===
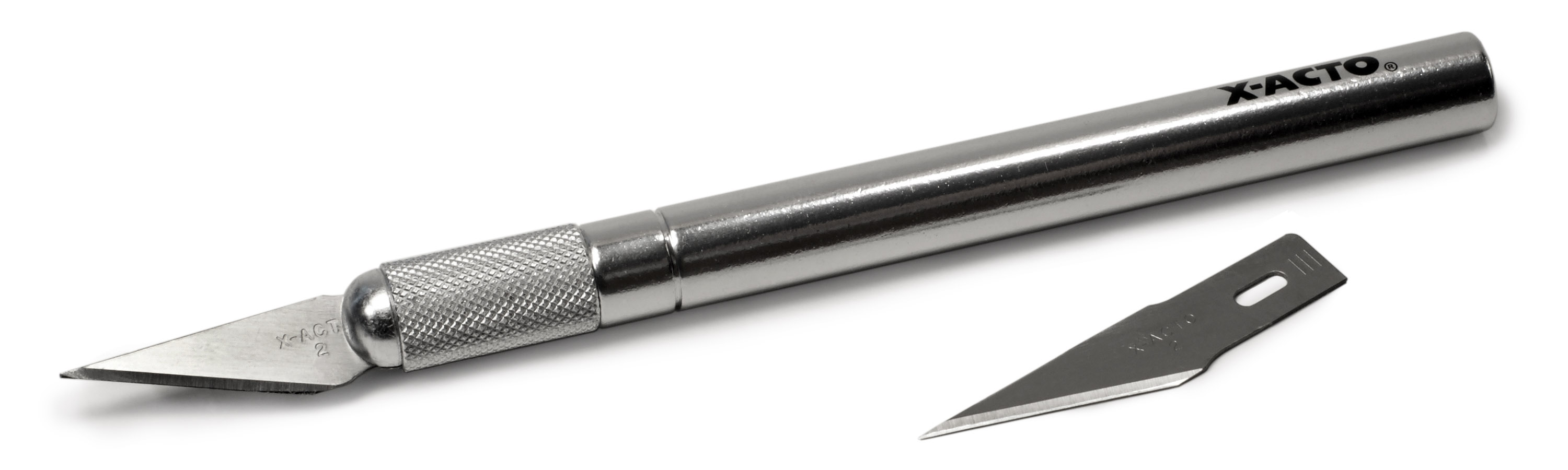
Craft knife

The most important tool used for conversions is a hobby or craft knife, usually with a sharp and narrow blade, allowing the hobbyist to get the blade into the deepest folds and creases of the miniature.

=== Modelling putty ===
There are many choices of putty for sculpting and converting miniature figures, such as Milliput and Greenstuff (Kneadite). Milliput is a two-part modelling epoxy putty, which is considered a good sculpting medium and is used by many professional miniature sculptors. Green stuff is another two-part epoxy putty, with blue and yellow components that turn green when mixed together. Both Milliput and Greenstuff must be allowed several hours to dry (although this can be sped up using a hot lamp).

Milliput is recommended for sculpting the frame of larger miniatures, as it dries hard and can be chiselled away with a knife afterwards if necessary. Greenstuff or 'Kneadatite', the putty sold in Games Workshop stores, is softer and much stickier than Milliput. When fully dry it retains a degree of rubbery flexibility. Although initially much harder to work with, Greenstuff is a superior medium to Milliput for sculpting small miniatures such as 25mm figures, and is widely used by artists in that scale. In addition to sculpting, modelling putty can also be used to cover up any gaps left when using other tools to convert miniatures.

== Types of conversion ==
=== Kitbashing ===
One simple form of miniature conversion is known as "kitbashing", in which components of different kits are mixed to produce unique models. More complex conversions, however, often involve modifying the component parts, for instance by cutting or drilling.

=== Repositioning and weapon swaps ===
Repositioning body parts such as the head, arms or torso of a miniature figure is one of the simplest types of conversion. Another simple technique is weapon swapping. Weapons can be taken from sprues or other miniatures and used to replace whatever weapon the converted miniature is holding to create any variety of distinctive commanders.

Conversions can also be used to give miniatures flags, banners or pennants if desired. A banner can be added to a miniature bearing a pike or spear, or a flagstaff can be made from a brass rod, which is quite rigid. In the latter case, any weapon the miniature is holding must be cut away and the fist drilled out to allow it hold the wire pole. The banner itself can be made from paper and painted with PVA glue, which stiffens sufficiently as it dries. The banner is then glued to the pole and painted.

=== Head swaps ===
Head swaps are a very easy way for wargamers to create unique miniatures. As the name suggests, the head of one miniature is substituted for that of another. The hobbyist must take considerable care when removing the existing head of the miniature to be converted, both for safety and to ensure the best surface to place the new head upon. Most of the head is clipped off and anything left is filed or shaved away with a sharp craft knife. This ensures a smooth surface onto which the new head can be glued and pinned.

This technique is very useful for wargamers when making multiples of the same character to allow equipment to be chosen more easily to help tailor an army for different situations. Normally the head that is to be kept will be cut (normally sawn) from the body as low as possible to avoid damage, the recipient body will normally be decapitated higher up to preserve the torso. The two pieces will be filed to the right size and glued together, possibly with the help of pins for strength.

=== Weathering and shaving ===
Weathering is a widely popular family of conversions that many hobbyists practice. In its simplest form it is adding imperfection to make the model look "used". Common forms of weathering include everything from adding battle damage and creating men in non-standard attire for wargamers and military modellers to adding rust or dirt effects.

Shaving scale armour off some miniatures can also be used to change their appearance significantly. A knife is used to alter carefully the clothing and armour sculpted onto the miniature, or to shave off other features. The surface is then smoothed, and what was once armour can be painted as cloth to complete the conversion. Some items such as belts, bandoliers and straps can be shaven off without much difficulty, in order to achieve a different troop type.

== Methods and techniques ==
=== Pinning ===
Pinning is a technique used when assembling large or heavy model kits, and involves drilling a hole in two pieces of the model to be joined, and using a "pin" to strengthen the bond when they are glued. Pinning is a useful technique for reinforcing joints and is essential when making models from parts that were not designed to go together, such as a miniature conversion.

=== Sculpting ===
Some modelers, who are happy to go that far and have the material available, will remove and sculpt certain parts of the figure. This is usually motivated by lack of poses. For example, new arms may be sculpted on to turn an infantryman pose into an artilleryman pose, but a step like this is quite extravagant and most people who need to sculpt to convert will do so with small details such as buttons or chinstraps. Sometimes a figure is converted to improve its historical accuracy.

=== Bits boxes ===
Bits boxes are collections of spare bits and pieces of model kits left over from models that have options of multiple parts. The spelling "bitz" has been popularised by Games Workshop in recent years, reflecting Ork speech patterns in the various Games Workshop rulebooks, codices and official novels. Games Workshop also sells "bitz" and component parts separately, enabling enthusiasts to order parts of metal miniatures (shields, crossbows, swords, etc.) to allow less expensive conversions. The sale of bits has also become a significant market for independent online stores.

== See also ==
- Greeble
