= 1982 Origins Award winners =

List of award winner

The following are the winners of the 9th annual (1982) Origins Award, presented at Origins 1983:

== Charles Roberts Awards ==
Category	Winner	Company	Designer(s)
Best Pre-20th Century Boardgame of 1982	Civilization	Avalon Hill	Thomas Treshan
Best 20th Century Boardgame of 1982	Storm Over Arnhem	Avalon Hill	Courtney Allen
Best Science Fiction Boardgame of 1982	Illuminati	Steve Jackson Games	Steve Jackson
Best Fantasy Boardgame of 1982	Sherlock Holmes: Consulting Detective	Sleuth Publications	Gary Grady, Raymond Edwards, Suzanne Goldberg
Best Professional Boardgaming Magazine of 1982	Fire & Movement	Steve Jackson Games	Friedrich Helfferich, ec
Best Adventure Game for Home Computer of 1982	Wizardry II: The Knight of Diamonds	Sir-Tech	Andrew C. Greenberg, Robert Woodhead
Best Amateur Adventure Gaming Magazine of 1982	Journal of 20th Century Wargaming		Nick Schuessler, ec
Adventure Gaming Hall of Fame	Steve Jackson		

== The H.G. Wells Awards ==
Category	Winner	Company	Designer(s)
Best Historical Figure Series of 1982	Siege Equipment	RAFM	Bill Schwartz
Best Fantasy or Science Fiction Figure Series of 1982	Personalities and Things that Go Bump in the Night	Ral Partha	Tom Meier, Julie Guthrie, Dennis Mize
Best Vehicular Model Series of 1982	Micro Armor	GHQ	Greg Scott & Company
Best Miniatures Rules of 1982	Striker	GDW	Frank Chadwick
Best Roleplaying Rules of 1982	Behind Enemy Lines	FASA	William H. Keith Jr.
Best Roleplaying Adventure of 1982	Citybook I: Butcher, Baker, Candlestick Maker	Flying Buffalo	Mike Stackpole, Pat Mueller
Best Professional Miniatures Magazine of 1982	The Courier	Courier Publishing	Dick Bryant
Best Professional Roleplaying Magazine of 1982	The Space Gamer	Steve Jackson Games	Aaron Allston, ed
All Time Best Miniatures Rules for American Civil War Land Battles of 1982	Rally Round the Flag	Iron Brigade Miniatures	Craig Taylor
All Time Best Miniatures Rules for Science Fiction Battles of 1982	Striker	GDW	Frank Chadwick
