= 1983 Origins Award winners =

The following are the winners of the 10th annual (1983) Origins Award, presented at Origins 1984:

== Charles Roberts Awards ==
Category	Winner	Company	Designer(s)
Best Pre-20th Century Boardgame of 1983	The Civil War	Victory Games	
Best 20th Century Boardgame of 1983	Ambush!	Victory Games	
Best Science Fiction Boardgame of 1983	Nuclear Escalation	Flying Buffalo	
Best Fantasy Boardgame of 1983	Lost Worlds	Nova	
Best Professional Boardgaming Magazine of 1983	Fire & Movement		
Best Adventure Game for Home Computer of 1983	Knights of the Desert	SSI	
Best Amateur Adventure Gaming Magazine of 1983	Journal of 20th Century Wargaming		
Adventure Gaming Hall of Fame	Dave Arneson		

== The H.G. Wells Awards ==
Category	Winner	Company	Designer(s)
Best Historical Figure Series of 1983	Siege Equipment	RAFM	
Best Fantasy or Science Fiction Figure Series of 1983	Call of Cthulhu	Grenadier Models	
Best Vehicular Model Series of 1983	Dwarf Steam Cannon	Ral Partha	
Best Miniatures Rules of 1983	Johnny Reb	Adventure Games	
Best Roleplaying Rules of 1983	James Bond 007	Victory Games	
Best Roleplaying Adventure of 1983	Stormhaven	Flying Buffalo	
Best Professional Miniatures Magazine of 1983	The Courier		
Best Professional Roleplaying Magazine of 1983	Dragon		
