= 1991 Origins Award winners =

Gaming award winners

The following are the winners of the 18th annual (1991) Origins Award, presented at Origins 1992:

Category	Winner	Company	Designer(s)
Best Historical Figure Series of 1991	Pendragon Knight & Lady Sets	Lance & Laser	Tom Meier
Best Fantasy or Science Fiction Figure Series of 1991	Call of Cthulhu	RAFM	Bob Murch
Best Fantasy or Science Fiction Figure Series of 1991	Shadowrun	Ral Partha	Tom Meier, Dennis Mize, David Summers
Best Vehicular Miniatures Series of 1991	BattleTech Mechs & Vehicles	Ral Partha	Jeff Wilhelm, David Summers, Sandy Garrity, Richard Kerr, Tom Meier, Bob Charrette, Julie Guthrie
Best Miniatures Accessory Series of 1991	Battlescapes	Geo Hex	Kieran Rohan
Best Miniatures Rules of 1991	Star Wars Miniatures Rules	West End Games	Stephen Crane
Best Roleplaying Rules of 1991	Vampire: The Masquerade	White Wolf	Mark Rein·Hagen
Best Roleplaying Adventure of 1991	Horror on the Orient Express (for Call of Cthulhu)	Chaosium	Mark Morrison, with Geoff Gillan, Nick Hagger, Bernard Caleo, Penelope Love, Russell Waters, Marion Anderson, Phil Anderson, Richard Watts, Peter Jeffery, Christian Lehmann, Lynn Willis, Thomas Ligotti
Best Roleplaying Supplement of 1991	GURPS Time Travel	Steve Jackson Games	Steve Jackson, John M Ford
Best Play-by-Mail Game of 1991	Illuminati	Flying Buffalo	Draper Kauffman
Best New Play-by-Mail Game of 1991	Middle Earth	Game Systems Inc	William Feild, Peter Stassun
Best Graphic Presentation of a Roleplaying Game, Adventure, or Supplement of 1991	Horror on the Orient Express (for Call of Cthulhu)	Chaosium	Les Brooks, Lynn Willis, Charlie Krank
Best Pre-20th Century Boardgame of 1991	Blackbeard	The Avalon Hill Game Company	Richard Berg
Best Modern-Day Boardgame of 1991	East Front	Columbia	Craig Besinque, Tom Dalgliesh
Best Fantasy or Science Fiction Boardgame of 1991	Cosmic Encounter	Mayfair	Bill Eberle, Jack Kittridge, Peter Olotka, Bill Norton, Jack Barker, David Goun, Sean Rhoades, Richard Sheaves, Mark Simon.
Best Graphic Presentation of a Boardgame of 1991	HeroQuest	Milton Bradley	
Best Fantasy or Science Fiction Computer Game of 1991	Wing Commander II	Origin Systems	
Best Military or Strategy Computer Game of 1991	Sid Meier's Civilization	Microprose	Sid Meier
Best Professional Adventure Gaming Magazine of 1991	White Wolf	White Wolf	Stewart Wieck, Richard Thomas, Chris McDonough
Best Amateur Adventure Gaming Magazine of 1991	Midwest Wargamers Association Newsletter		Hal Thinglum
Adventure Gaming Hall of Fame	Don Greenwood, Tom Meier		
