= 1979 Origins Award winners =

The following are the winners of the 6th annual (1979) Origins Award, presented at Origins 1980.

== Charles Roberts Awards ==
Category	Winner	Company	Designer(s)
Best Pre-20th Century Game	Napoleon at Leipzig	OSG	Kevin Zucker
Best 20th Century Game	City Fight	SPI	Joseph Balkoski
Best Fantasy or Science Fiction Game	The Creature That Ate Sheboygan	SPI	Greg Costikyan
Best Initial Release	Ironclads	Yaquinto	John Fuseler
Best Professional Magazine	Fire & Movement	Rodger MacGowan & Baron Publishing	
Best Amateur Magazine	Perfidious Albion	Charles Vasey	

== The H.G. Wells Awards ==
Category	Winner	Company	Designer(s)
Best Historical Figure Series of 1979	System Seven Napoleonics	GDW	
Best Fantasy or Science Fiction Figure Series of 1979	Collectables	Ral Partha	
Best Vehicular Model Series of 1979	OGRE series	Martian Metals	
Best Miniatures Rules of 1979	System Seven Napoleonics	GDW	
Best Roleplaying Rules of 1979	Commando	SPI	
Best Roleplaying Adventure of 1979	Kinunir	GDW	
Best Magazine Covering Miniatures of 1979	The Courier		
Best Magazine Covering Roleplaying of 1979	Journal of the Travellers Aid Society	GDW	
All Time Best 20th Century Naval Rules of 1979	General Quarters	Brookhurst	
All Time Best Ancient Medieval Rules of 1979	Chivalry & Sorcery	Fantasy Games Unlimited	

== Adventure Gaming Hall of Fame Inductee ==
- David Isby
