= 1978 Origins Award winners =

The following are the winners of the 5th annual (1978), Origins Award, presented at Origins 1979.

== Charles Roberts Awards ==
Category	Winner	Company	Designer(s)
Best Pre-20th Century Game	Source of the Nile	Discovery	David Wesely & Ross Maker
Best 20th Century Game	To the Green Fields Beyond	SPI	David Isby
Best Fantasy or Science Fiction Wargame	Mayday	GDW	Marc Miller
Best Wargame Graphics	Cross of Iron	The Avalon Hill Game Company	Scott Moores
Best Amateur Game	Source of the Nile	Discovery	David Wesely & Ross Maker
Best Professional Magazine	Fire & Movement	Rodger B. MacGowan & Baron Publishing	
Best Amateur Magazine	Perfidious Albion	Charles Vasey	

== The H.G. Wells Awards ==
Category	Winner	Company	Designer(s)
Best Historical Figure Series of 1978	Days of the Empire	Ral Partha	
Best Fantasy or Science Fiction Figure Series of 1978	Fantasy Collectors Series	Ral Partha	
Best Vehicular Model Series of 1978	Modern Micro Armor	GHQ	
Best Miniatures Rules of 1978	Fire & Steel	GDW	

== Adventure Gaming Hall of Fame Inductee ==
- John Hill
