= 1992 Origins Award winners =

Winners of the 1992 Origins Award, presented

The following are the winners of the 19th annual (1992) Origins Award, presented at Origins 1993:

Category	Winner	Company	Designer(s)
Best Historical Figure Series of 1992	Ravenloft	Ral Partha	Dennis Mize
Best Vehicular Miniatures Series of 1992	BattleTech Mechs & Vehicles	Ral Partha	Jeff Wilhelm, David Summers, Sandy Garrity, Richard Kerr, Tom Meier, Bob Charrette, Julie Guthrie
Best Vehicular Miniatures Series of 1992	Ogre Miniatures	Ral Partha	Jeff Wilhelm, David Summers, Richard Kerr
Best Historical Figure Series of 1992	Hyksos Ancient Biblical	Ral Partha	Jim Johnson
Best Miniatures Accessory Series of 1992	Tiny Terrain 15mm Fantasy	Simtac	Martin Fenelon
Best Miniatures Rules of 1992	Ogre Miniatures	Steve Jackson Games	Steve Jackson
Best Roleplaying Rules of 1992	Shadowrun, 2nd Edition	FASA	Tom Dowd with Paul Hume, Bob Charrette
Best Roleplaying Adventure of 1992	GURPS Cyberpunk Adventures	Steve Jackson Games	Editor Jeff Koke, designers David Pulver, Jak Koke, Timothy Keating
Best Roleplaying Supplement of 1992	GURPS Illuminati	Steve Jackson Games	Nigel Findley
Best Graphic Presentation of a Roleplaying Game, Adventure, or Supplement of 1992	Cthulhu for President (for Call of Cthulhu)	Chaosium	Charlie Krank, Les Brooks
Best Graphic Presentation of a Roleplaying Game, Adventure, or Supplement of 1992	Shadowrun, 2nd Edition	FASA	Jeff Laubenstein, Joel Biske
Best Play-by-Mail Game of 1992	Illuminati	Flying Buffalo	Draper Kauffman
Best Play-by-Mail Game of 1992	Middle Earth	Game Systems Inc	William Feild, Peter Stassun
Best New Play-by-Mail Game of 1992	Lords of Destiny	Maelstrom	
Best Pre-20th Century Boardgame of 1992	SPQR	GMT	Mark Herman, Richard Berg
Best Modern-Day Boardgame of 1992	Hacker	Steve Jackson Games	Steve Jackson
Best Fantasy or Science Fiction Boardgame of 1992	Nuclear Proliferation	Flying Buffalo	Rick Loomis
Best Graphic Presentation of a Boardgame of 1992	Battletech, 3rd Edition	FASA	Jeff Laubenstein, Jim Nelson
Best Fantasy or Science Fiction Computer Game of 1992	Ultima Underworld	Origin Systems	
Best Military or Strategy Computer Game of 1992	V for Victory	Three-Sixty Pacific	
Best Professional Adventure Gaming Magazine of 1992	White Wolf	White Wolf	Stewart Wieck, Richard Thomas, Chris McDonough
Best Amateur Adventure Gaming Magazine of 1992	Berg's Review of Games	Richard Berg	
