= Christian Lehmann =

Christian Lehmann may refer to:

- Christian Lehmann, an Ore Mountain chronicler, who reported on the Thirty Years' War in Raschau
- Christian Lehmann, a Major of the Reserves for Nazi Germany, who was awarded the Knight's Cross of the Iron Cross in 1944
- Christian Lehmann, an executive producer of the German television series, Plonsters
- Christian Lehmann, author of Ultimate Game, honored with an Mildred L. Batchelder Award in 2001
- Christian Lehmann, a one-time president of Societas Linguistica Europaea
- Christian Lehmann, a game designer whose credits include Horror on the Orient Express
- Christian Lehmann (linguist), German linguist

== See also ==
- Johann Georg Christian Lehmann, German botanist
