= Striker (miniatures game) =

Science fiction miniatures wargame

- Box cover by William H. Keith
- Designers: Frank Chadwick
- Illustrators: William H. Keith
- Publishers: Game Designers' Workshop
- Publication: 1981; 45 years ago
- Genres: Science fiction miniatures wargame
- Series: Traveller boardgames

Striker is a science fiction miniatures wargame, designed by Frank Chadwick, and illustrated by William H. Keith. It was published by Game Designers' Workshop in 1981 as a boxed expansion to the Traveller role-playing game. Although Striker is a 15mm miniatures ruleset, GDW consider it their eighth Traveller boardgame. It was republished in 2004 as part of Far Future Enterprises Traveller: The Classic Games, Games 1-6+.

== Gameplay ==
In 1994, an updated version Striker II, was published as a supplement for GDW's Traveller: The New Era.

The game used 15mm scale figures with a 1:1000 or 1:985 ground scale.

- The range of figures made by RAFM for Striker are still available, just not in their Striker unit compositions.

== Reception ==
In the July 1982 edition of The Space Gamer (Issue #53), William A. Barton gave a thumbs up, saying, "Striker is probably the most thorough, well-conceived and worthwhile set of miniatures rules yet published for SF or any post-19th century conflict. I heartily recommend it to Traveller players and miniature enthusiasts and look forward to future expansions."

Andy Slack reviewed Striker for White Dwarf #33, giving it an overall rating of 6 out of 10, and stated that "it covers and integrates all the elements of the Traveller combat environment for the first time, and allows vehicle design – although the game is enjoyable in its own right, and perfectly playable as a stand-alone set of miniatures rules; however, referees and players do have limited time available, and I for one prefer to spend it playing rather than designing tanks. The clean simplicity of Traveller is getting lost in a maze of calculations. Still, Striker, is believable and fun."

In the Fall 1983 edition of Ares (Issue 15), Thomas J. Thomas liked the well-organized "clear and concise" rules, and especially admired the fact that they were cross-referenced. Thomas also thought the command and initiative rules "demonstrate the limits on both a commander's time and the varying abilities of troops to respond to changing situations." However, he thought the need for written orders might be a problem for some players, and he criticized the use of the phrase "all statements must be clear and unambiguous", arguing that the statement itself was ambiguous. Thomas also thought the process for designing vehicles and aircraft was "incredibly time-consuming." He concluded with a strong recommendation for beginning miniatures players, stating, "Striker presents a significant advance for miniatures games... Though not without its flaws, Striker, nevertheless, is probably the most interesting and coherent modern miniatures game available."

== Reviews ==
- Adventure Gaming #10

== Awards ==
Striker won two Origins Awards:

- "Best Miniatures Rules of 1982"
- "All Time Best Miniatures Rules for Science Fiction Battles of 1982 "

== See also ==
- Traveller boardgames
