= Fire & Steel =

Board game

Fire & Steel is a 1978 board game published by Game Designers' Workshop.

== Gameplay ==
Fire & Steel is a wargame that depicts 15 mm Napoleonic miniatures battles in Europe between 1808 and 1858.

The components consisted of: Boxed set (6" x 9") consisting of: Rule book (56 pgs. 5.5" x 8.5"; staple bound with card stock covers); Organization book (56 pgs., 5.5" x 8.5", staple bound with card stock covers) player aid card - fire & melee combat, moral and casualty calculation tables (double sided, 8.5" x 11", center fold card stock (blue)); three player aid cards (double sided, 5.5" x 8.5", card stock) consisting of one terrain effects card (green); one unit capabilities chart (pink/red), and one weather and officer casualty chart (white); two player aid cards (double sides, 5.5" x 8.5", card stock) being identical unit roster charts meant to provide masters for reproduction (white); 23 player aid cards (mixed single and double sided, 5.5" x 8.5", card stock, three hole punched) for Unit Characteristics Chart by Nationality.

The game uses the System 7 Napoleonics rule system.

== Development and publication history ==
Fire & Steel was designed by Greg Novak, John Harshman and Paul Richard Banner, and published in 1978.

== Reception ==
Fire & Steel won the H.G. Wells award for Best Miniatures Rules of 1978.

== Reviews ==
- Review in Fire & Movement #17 (May-June 1979)
