= Greg Novak =

American wargame designer (1950–2012)

- Born: September 4, 1950
- Died: March 7, 2012 (aged 61)
- Resting place: Saint Marys Cemetery (Champaign, Illinois)
- Occupation: Game designer

Greg Novak (September 4, 1950 – March 7, 2012) was a wargame designer, author of dozens of games, rules supplements and scenario books, his most notable contributions including the Volley & Bayonet series and several works about the American War of Independence.

== Biography ==
Born on September 4, 1950, in Chicago, son of George and Sylvia (Stepnowski) Novak, and married to Donna Oakes Gerbino on July 19, 1997, Greg Novak worked as a librarian at Edison and Jefferson middle schools for 31 years, and for the Champaign Office of Education. He was active in the Champaign Teachers Federation, serving as a building steward, member of the collective bargaining unit, vice president and president. Upon his retirement he was elected to the Champaign Board of Education. After his death Champaign Unit 4 Schools named their Alternative High School facility in his honor.

== Wargaming ==
Greg Novak was a key figure in the wargaming hobby, leaving a lasting and internationally recognized legacy both as an author and as a promoter of wargaming events. Among his main contributions as an author should be listed :

Boardgames

- Guilford Courthouse (Series 120) – GDW1978

Rules

- Fire and Steel - Rules for Battles with System 7 Napoleonics, GDW 1978 (with John Harshman and Rich Banner)
- Charlie Company - Infantry Combat in Vietnam 1965-1972, Ulster Imports 1988 (with John Reeves)
- Yellow Ribbon : Rules for the Indian Wars, 1850-1890, Ulster Imports 1988
- Over the Top, WW1 Command Decision series rules, GDW 1990
- Volley & Bayonet, GDW 1994 (with Frank Chadwick)
- Charlie Company - Infantry Combat in Vietnam 1965-1972 (2nd ed), RAFM 1997 (with John Reeves)
- Volley & Bayonet: Road to Glory, TOB Games 2008 (with Frank Chadwick)

Rules supplements and Scenario books

- And Continually Wear the Blue: A Short Guide to the U.S. Army & the 'Indian Wars' 1850-90, RAFM 1989 (with Mike Gilbert).
- A Guide to the American War of Independence in the North, Ulster Imports 1990
- Remember the Maine and to Hell with Spain : Being a Wargamer's Guide to the Spanish American War 1898, Ulster Imports, 1990
- Battles of the American Civil War – A Volley & Bayonet supplement, GDW 1994
- The Rough Riders - Vol.1: A Volley & Bayonet Supplement for the Spanish–American War, GDW 1999 (with Frank Chadwick).
- The Rough Riders - Vol.2: A Volley & Bayonet Supplement for the Spanish–American War, GDW 1999 (with Frank Chadwick).
- The American War of Independence - Book 1: The Northern Campaigns, Old Glory
- The American War of Independence - Book 2: The Southern Campaigns, Old Glory

Greg Novak was also Editor of the Command Post Quarterly magazine (published by the GDW and Emperor's Headquarters)-

== Awards ==
Member of the Legion of Honour, Historical Miniatures Gaming Society - East
