= Mayday (game) =

Science fiction tabletop wargame

- Cover art by Rodger B. MacGowan
- Designers: Marc W. Miller
- Illustrators: Rodger B. MacGowan
- Publishers: Game Designers' Workshop
- Publication: 1978; 48 years ago
- Genres: Board wargame
- Series: Traveller boardgames, Series 120

Mayday is a space combat board wargame published by Game Designers' Workshop (GDW) in 1978 that was designed to be used with GDW's science fiction role-playing game Traveller.

== Description ==
Mayday is a spaceship-to-spaceship board wargame designed to simulate combat between smaller spaceships — the largest is 800 tons — including scouts, couriers, escorts, free traders, yachts, transports, pinnaces and cutters.

The game components are a four-piece geomorphic hex grid map scaled at one light-second per hex, 150 counters representing ships, missiles and planets, and an eight-page rulebook.

=== Gameplay ===
This game uses a standard "I Go, You Go" alternating series of turns, where one person moves and fires, followed by the other player. There are also rules for return fire, programming the ships' computers, and launching missiles. Combat is by laser and missile fire.

=== Scenarios ===
Five scenarios are detailed in the rulebook: The Grand Prix, The Attack, Piracy, Battle, and Smuggling.

== Publication history ==
Mayday was designed by Marc W. Miller and was published by GDW as a ziplock bag game with artwork by Rodger B. MacGowan. The game was part of GDW's "Series 120" – games with 120 pieces that were designed to be learned and played in 120 minutes. It was the second boardgame to be published for Traveller.

A second edition was published in 1980, and a third edition was published in 2004 as part of Far Future Enterprises Traveller: The Classic Games, Games 1-6+.

The game was translated into Japanese and published as "メイデイ" ("Mayday") by Hobby Japan in 1985, and also appeared in the inaugural edition of the Japanese magazine RPGamer in 2004, published by Kokusai-Tsushin (国際通信社).

== Reception ==
In Issue 18 of The Space Gamer, Tony Zamparutti noted that although the component quality was high, and the rule book was easy to read, "The scenario instructions, on the other hand, are very vague; many neglect to tell you just where the ships start." Zamparutti also felt that "By itself, Mayday is not that exciting of a game. Although its movement system is innovative, the game as a whole is not as good as many other tactical space games." Zamparutti concluded, "The rules could use some polishing in places, and more attention should have been given to the various scenarios. However, Mayday should make a fairly good game for owners of Traveller who do not want to bother with the miniature rules in that game, or who want to have an expansion of the missile rules in Traveller."

In Issue 33 of the British wargaming magazine Perfidious Albion, Charles Vasey and Geoffrey Barnard discussed the game. Vasey commented, "Mayday, as a game, is nothing to write home about ... Mayday exists as a mere asteroid in the comet-tail of Traveller." Barnard replied, "This game, like Triplanetary, uses a quite detailed system of inertial movement, and the system works quite well ... [Bookkeeping] is a bit of a problem, especially if there are a lot of ships in play, but it is the price of a much more detailed and complex combat system." Vasey concluded, ""Of great use to the Traveller player, owners of Triplanetary will want it for adapting their game, but not of great use to many other gamers — at least not once the fun of flying wears off." Barnard concluded, "The only redeeming feature of this game, as a game, is the presentation of the inertial system, any fan of [science fiction] games is recommended to at least try this system to see how it should be done ... I would tend to see Mayday as an ideas package, and not as a self-contained game. You can play it as it stands, it is just that there is not much to it, there is more value to be obtained in pinching ideas from it for other games."

In Issue 22 of the British wargaming magazine Phoenix, J. and D. Evans noted, "Whilst most of the game mechanics functioned well and many of the scenarios were fun, the game contained a number of 'opaque' areas." The Evans particularly noted the lack of boarding rules, problems with laser target selection, and ambiguity around flying over or around planets. They also felt that several scenarios were too simplistic or unbalanced. The Evans concluded, "Overall, Mayday contains many good ideas but has too many shortcomings for any high recommendation."

In the first issue of Ares (March 1980), David Ritchie commented, "Combat, maneuver and navigation are all affected by the capacity of the ship's computer and the program currently in progress (a nice touch). Relatively simple. Playable within two hours." Ritchie concluded by giving it a rating of 6 out of 9.

== Reviews ==
- Perfidious Albion #36 (February 1979) p. 2-3
- Analog Science Fiction and Fact

== Awards ==
At the 1978 Origins Award, Mayday won the Charles S. Roberts Award for "Best Fantasy or Science Fiction Wargame".

== See also ==
Traveller boardgames
