= Personalities (Ral Partha) =

Miniature figures

Personalities is a set of miniatures published by Ral Partha.

== Contents ==
Personalities is a line of 25mm fantasy miniatures designed by Tom Meier, each containing one to three figures.

== Reception ==
John Rankin reviewed Personalities in The Space Gamer No. 60. Rankin commented that "While one could do no better than to build a collection entirely of Personalities, the real beauty of the line is that each figure or small set is a stand-alone item. Each set provides the basis for either one's own character (the mounted and dismounted poses are a boon here), or for a unique encounter within a campaign setting."

Aaron Allston reviewed Personalities for Fantasy Gamer magazine and stated that "Problems? Not many. The Paladins set is probably the most commonly useful; it's also the dullest. The Plague Fly set is the least commonly useful; it's so nice, however, that it practically dictates an encounter with the Belladonna Knights. The Cloud Giant may be a bit clownish for some gamers. But these are trivial complaints. These are good sets."

25mm Personalities was awarded the Charles S. Roberts Award for "Best Fantasy or Science Fiction Figure Series of 1984".

== See also ==
- List of lines of miniatures
