= Guilford Courthouse (board wargame) =

1978 American Revolution board wargame

Cover of original ziplock bag edition, 1978

Guilford Courthouse is a board wargame published by Game Designers' Workshop (GDW) in 1978 that simulates the Battle of Guilford Court House during the American Revolution. Reviews of the game were mixed: critics liked the rules system but found the game predictable, with only a few strategic options open to either player.

== Background ==
In March 1781, a small British force of professional soldiers engaged a much larger colonial force of mainly militia near Guilford Courthouse, North Carolina.

== Description ==
Guilford Courthouse is a two-player game in which one player controls the British forces, and the other controls the rebels. The game was one of the first "Series 120" games produced by GDW — simple wargames with a small 17" x 22" hex grid map, only 120 counters or less, and designed to be played in less than 120 minutes. The game system uses a simple alternating "I Go, You Go" system, where one player moves and fires, followed by the other player. In addition, there are rules for morale that affect the firepower of units, special rules for the various types of soldiers, and leaders have an effect on combat.

This game lasts for 18 turns, and can be played in two hours or less.

=== Victory conditions ===
The American player receives victory points for eliminating British units. The British player only gets victory points for eliminating units of the Continental army — militia units are disregarded. The player with the most victory points at the end of the game is the winner.

== Publication history ==
In the mid-1970s, large and complex board wargames such as Drang Nach Osten! and Terrible Swift Sword were very popular among experienced gamers, but were impossible to play in a single session, and were very difficult for new players to learn. In response, GDW created "Series 120", smaller and less complex games that used no more than 120 counters and would take less than 120 minutes to play. One of the first was Guilford Courthouse, designed by Frank Chadwick, Marc Miller, and Greg Novak, and published by GDW in 1978 as a ziplock game. In 1980, GDW re-released it as a boxed set retitled The Battle of Guilford Courthouse.

== Reception ==
In Issue 32 of the British wargaming magazine Perfidious Albion, Charles Vasey and Geoffrey Barnard discussed the game. Vasey commented, "The game has nice production values and does go far in simulating the horrible problems for the British commander." However, Vasey had some reservations, noting, "The rules have some holes and unfortunate effects." One of these, as Vasey pointed out, was that because British victory points relied on elimination of only Continental units, it had the non-historical consequence that the American player could exploit this rule by placing militia units (worth no victory points) in the front lines while the Continental Army "runs away and hides." Barnard replied, "This is a nice, straightforward game. ... There are problems with it, but they are problems caused by the uniqueness of the game, not by the ordinariness of the system." Barnard noted that exploiting the rules might result in "guerrilla-like operations." Vasey concluded, "With care this system could be developed, and hopefully GDW will do so." Barnard concluded, "A neat little game, worthy of a lot more attention that its size might suggest."

In the 1980 book The Best of Board Wargaming, Marcus Watney commented "Although the game is simple and without any serious rule problems, it remains a strangely unsatisfactory game." He ascribed this to "lack of strategic options: realistic perhaps, but in the end uninteresting." He also noted that the map did not contain a terrain key, leading to misunderstandings about what was wooded forest and what was clear terrain. Nevertheless, although he gave an "Excitement Grade" of only 10%, he gave a guarded recommendation, saying, "Still, there are so few games about the individual battles in the American Revolution that any such game should be welcomed."

In the 1980 book The Complete Book of Wargames, game designer Jon Freeman called the game interestingly subtle and covers many areas of eighteenth century warfare in nice detail." However he found the game unsatisfying, commenting, "the system is better than the game." He also noted the lack of a terrain key for the map didn't help the game. He pointed out that strategic possibilities were limited for both players, saying, "both sides seem to have optimum strategies, and play can become stereotyped (and tangentially quite dissimilar to the actual battle.)" He concluded by giving the game an Overall Evaluation of only Fair to Good, commenting "Despite its ease of play and excellent system, many players will probably lose interest quickly [...] the game is not equal to the sum of its parts."

== Other reviews and commentary ==
- The Grenadier #16
- Fire & Movement #24
- Casus Belli (Issue 20 - April 1984)
