= The Adventurers (Ral Partha) =

Miniature line by Ral Partha

The Adventurers is a set of miniatures published by Ral Partha.

== Contents ==
The Adventurers is a line of 25mm fantasy miniatures designed by Tom Meier, with each 4" x 5 1/2" box containing eight figures.

== Reception ==
John Rankin reviewed The Adventurers in The Space Gamer No. 60. Rankin commented that "While The Adventurers are obviously aimed at those getting into the hobby, experienced gamers should also take notice. Everything you expect in the way of quality from Ral Partha is here, nicely packaged, and at a good price."

== See also ==
- List of lines of miniatures
