= Final Frontier (game) =

Miniatures game

Final Frontier is a 1980 miniatures game published by Ral Partha.

== Gameplay ==
Final Frontier is a miniatures game in which the Terran infantry opposes the Krudz.

== Reception ==
Billy Moore reviewed Final Frontier in The Space Gamer No. 32. Moore commented that "I would recommend this game to those players who are in need of science fiction infantry miniatures, and enjoy creating their own rules."
