= Personalities and Things that Go Bump in the Night =

Miniatures

Personalities and Things That Go Bump in the Night is a set of miniatures published by Ral Partha.

== Contents ==
Personalities and Things That Go Bump in the Night is a line of 25mm scale fantasy miniatures that were designed by Tom Meier.

== Reception ==
Spalding Boldrick reviewed Personalities and Things That Go Bump in the Night in The Space Gamer No. 46. Boldrick commented that "The extensive and ever-expanding series has for some time represented just about the best available in FRP miniatures."

Personalities & Things That Go Bump In The Night was awarded the Origins Award for "Best Fantasy or Science Fiction Figure Series of 1982".

== See also ==
- List of lines of miniatures
