= Knights of the Desert =

1983 video game

- Commodore 64 cover art
- Developer: Tactical Design Group
- Publisher: Strategic Simulations
- Designer: Chuck Kroegel
- Platforms: Apple II, Atari 8-bit, Commodore 64, MS-DOS, TRS-80
- Release: 1983
- Genre: Turn-based strategy
- Mode: Single-player

Knights of the Desert is a 1983 computer wargame developed by Tactical Design Group and published by Strategic Simulations for the Apple II, Atari 8-bit computers, Commodore 64, MS-DOS, and TRS-80. It is based on the 1940-43 North African campaign.

== Gameplay ==
Gameplay screenshot (Atari 8-bit)

Players have the option to play set pieces of the campaign or the entire campaign as a theatre commander. For example, players can play as either the Axis or Allies in 1941 when Rommel bypassed Tobruk or again in 1942 when he had captured it or on the eve of El Alamein.

Limited in scope and playability (the map only stretched from western Libya to Alexandria), the game did not involve the forces of Operation Torch (United States and allied French) in 1943.

== Reception ==
Softline in 1983 called Knights of the Desert "a very fluid and exciting game ... not a simple nor a simplistic program". Computer Gaming World in 1983 complimented it for being both easy to play and offering realistic units and combat, and concluded that Knights of the Desert "is another solid step toward the ideal computer wargame". A 1987 overview of World War II simulations in the magazine was harsher, rating it two out of five points and calling the game "slow and ponderous ... does not deliver its potential". A 1993 survey in the magazine of wargames gave the game one-plus stars out of five for similar reasons.

Knights of the Desert was awarded the Charles S. Roberts Award for "Best Adventure Game for Home Computer of 1983".
