= Siege Equipment =

Miniature line by Rafm

Siege Equipment is a line of miniatures published by Rafm Miniatures beginning in 1982.

== Contents ==
Siege Equipment is a line of twelve different kits of 25mm miniatures containing pieces such as catapults and ballistas as well as less common items including the crow and fire raiser.

== Reception ==
Steve Jackson reviewed Siege Equipment in The Space Gamer No. 58. Jackson commented that "this is an attractive and authentic line. I recommend it without reservation to both fantasy and historical miniaturists. A siege is a siege, and here's what you need to win it."

25mm Siege Equipment was awarded the Origins Award for "Best Historical Figure Series of 1982".

Steve Jackson reviewed Siege Equipment and Siege Crews for Fantasy Gamer magazine and stated that "It's hard for me to find any real criticism of this line; it is simply the best of its kind. Some of the big pieces are a trifle expensive for any but the serious collector, but I can't say they're actually overpriced, not when they include all that costly cast lead, plus exploded drawings, plus a photo of the finished piece to make sure you get it right the first time."

== See also ==
- List of lines of miniatures
