= Horror on the Orient Express =

Tabletop horror role-playing game campaign

A Luxury Campaign Spanning the European Continent
- Cover art by Lee Gibbons, 1991.
- Designers: Geoff Gillan; Nick Hagger; Penelope Love; Marion Anderson; Richard Watts; Christian Lehmann; Mark Morrison; Bernard Caleo; Russell Waters; Phil Anderson; Peter F. Jeffery; L. N. Isinwy-II; Thomas Ligotti; Lynn Willis
- Publishers: Chaosium
- Publication: 1991 1st edition; 2014 2nd edition
- Genres: Horror
- Systems: Basic Role-Playing
- ISBN: 978-1568823904

Horror on the Orient Express is a campaign boxed set published by Chaosium in 1991 for the horror role-playing game Call of Cthulhu. In this adventure, the player characters use the Orient Express to search for pieces of an artifact, while a cult tries to stop them. The original edition won two Origins Awards and received positive reviews in game periodicals including The Unspeakable Oath, White Wolf, and Dragon. A revised and expanded edition was published in 2014, which won three ENnie Awards.

== Description ==
The Investigators must search for the pieces of an artifact called the Sedefkar Simulacrum. A cult called the Brothers of the Skin tries to stop them. The campaign starts in London and continues along the route that the Orient Express uses. The game notes indicate that this is a very deadly adventure with an expected investigator mortality rate of 70%; reviewers confirmed that the adventure was very difficult to survive.

The first edition boxed set contains:

- four campaign books totalling 205 pages
- 32-page "Strangers on the Train" booklet
- 16 pages of player hand-outs
- 17” × 27” map sheet
- four 11” × 17” cardboard cut-out train car plans
- 11” × 17” cardboard cut-out of Sedefkar Simulacrum
- 11” × 17” cut-out of Scroll of the Head
- four passport forms
- two luggage stickers
- 11” × 15” Chaosium Inc. poster

== Publication history ==
In the 2014 book Designers & Dragons, game historian Shannon Appelcline discussed early 1990s publications for Call of Cthulhu, and noted that "Horror on the Orient Express (1991), another classic mega-adventure, also appeared during these years."

The game was designed by Geoff Gillan, Nick Hagger, Penelope Love, Marion Anderson, Richard Watts, Christian Lehmann, Mark Morrison, Bernard Caleo, Russell Waters, Phil Anderson, Peter F. Jeffery, L. N. Isinwy-II, Thomas Ligotti, and Lynn Willis. Interior art was by Earl Geier, Laurie Deitrick, Carol Triplett, and Gustaf Bjorksten, and cover art was by Lee Gibbons.

A revised and expanded edition was released in 2014, a boxed set designed by Phil Anderson, Marion Anderson, Bernard Caleo, David Conyers, Carl Ford, Geoff Gillan, Nick Hagger, L.N. Isinwyll, Peter F. Jeffery, Mike Lay, Christian Lehmann, Penelope Love, Paul Maclean, Mike Mason, Mark Morrison, Matthew Pook, Oscar Rios, Hans-Christian Vortisch, Russell Waters, Darren Watson, Richard Watts, and William Workman. Artwork was by Gustaf Björksten, Patricio Contreras-Toro, Laurie Deitrick, Dean Engelhardt, Earl Geier, Lee Gibbons, Stephanie McAlea, Marco Primo, Roger Raupp, and Carol Triplett.

== Reception ==
In the Fall 1991 edition of The Unspeakable Oath (Issue #4), John Tynes called the 1991 product "one of the most intriguing releases Chaosium has ever put out." He was impressed by the quality of the player handouts, calling them "luxurious", especially "the passports, printed on linen paper with graciously embossed seals." However, although Tynes thought the first few scenarios were quite good, he did not like the middle section of the game where he felt "things rocket downhill as the campaign goes from okay, to fair, to middling, then begins to suck." Tynes felt that the middle third of the game railroaded the players by leading them along one storyline — "pop the investigators into one end of the tube and pop them out the other." But Tynes was impressed with the final third of the game, calling it "just excellent. Lots of thrills and nasty stuff, some good investigative work, and a series of false climaxes that will leave players wheezing and investigators dead." Tynes concluded by saying that the game "is really for experienced Keepers only." He rated the final third of the campaign 8 out of 10, but overall gave the game a poor rating of only 5 out of 10 due to the middle third of the game.

Wayne Ligon reviewed Horror on the Orient Express in White Wolf #30 (Feb., 1992), rating it a 5 out of 5 and stated that "What can one say about 200 pages of top-quality adventure? I could go on and on and still never scratch the surface. There is something for everyone here, though, and the Investigators can be powerful vets and babies in the woods. It will take you several months of dedicated play if the Keeper decides to pull out the stops, and even then you may not be through with it. You may never be finished."

In the September 1992 edition of Dragon (Issue #185), Rick Swan was impressed, calling this campaign "a start-to-finish knockout, a dazzling and intoxicating Call of Cthulhu campaign with the scope and richness of an epic novel. Thanks to the strong narrative and skillful pacing, the suspense never lags and the surprises never stop coming, a remarkable achievement for an adventure spanning more than 200 pages." The only negative note Swan made was about the game box, which he called "a flimsy single-piece affair virtually guaranteed to disintegrate," but he gave everything else the thumbs-up. "The components themselves are superb [...] The books are well-organized and loaded with troubleshooting tips, making the complex adventure relatively easy to run [...] The story carries the players along on a series of cascading shocks, each more jaw-dropping than the one before." He concluded with a strong recommendation, saying, "Many RPG products aspire to greatness, but few actually achieve it. Horror on the Orient Express qualifies as a work of art. The provocative cast of characters, colorful settings, and heart-stopping encounters add up to a gaming experience that few players will soon forget. I envy anyone who’s about to get started. I wish I could do it again."

In a review of Horror on the Orient Express in Black Gate, John ONeill said "It was a huge undertaking — a complete campaign that spanned the European continent, crammed into a box containing four lengthy books, numerous player handouts, a European route map; cardstock plans of the train that could be laid end-to-end; scrolls, and even luggage stickers. It wasn't merely a high water mark for CoC; it was a template for how mega-adventures could be created."

In the November–December 2014 issue of Casus Belli, Marc Sautriot reviewed the 2014 edition, and noted that the 704 pages of material covering 19 separate scenarios would likely result in over 120 hours of playing time. With such a large amount of material, Sautriot was not surprised to find that several scenarios were much weaker than others, "the finale is endless and the last scenario doesn't work." He was also disappointed that much of the action takes place off of the train. But he did admit the overall work had "life, adventure, terror, mystery, twists and turns."

== Awards ==
At the 1992 Origins Award, the 1991 edition won two awards, for "Best Roleplaying Adventure of 1991", and "Best Graphic Presentation of a Roleplaying Game, Adventure, or Supplement of 1991".

At the 2015 ENnie Awards, the 2014 edition was nominated in seven categories. It won gold in "Best Adventure" and "Best Cartography", and silver in "Best Production Values".
