= System 7 Napoleonics =

Miniatures line and rules system for tabletop miniatures wargaming

System 7 Napoleonics is a miniatures line and rules system for tabletop miniatures wargaming published by Game Designers' Workshop in 1978.

== Contents ==
System 7 Napoleonics is used for miniatures wargaming, and features double-sided die-cut cardboard counters that are used instead of metal miniature figures.

== Reception ==
In the June 1979 edition of Dragon (Issue #26), Tim Kask pointed out the value of these counters for newcomers to miniatures wargaming, calling System 7 Napoleonics "the most significant release in recent wargaming history [...] potentially hobby shaking and revolutionary." Kask concluded "System 7 is colorful, inepxpensive, accurate and possess the 'feel' of the period; what more can I say, except that you ought to run right out and buy it."

In the same issue of Dragon, Bill Fawcett admitted that $8 worth of cardboard counters "lack the aesthetic beauty of multitudes of minutely painted 25 mm or 15 mm figures" but pointed out that an equivalent number of unpainted metal miniatures "would probably cost nearly $1000." The counters weren't without issues — Fawcett pointed out that keeping hundreds of counters organized would require some work, and the small counters were "hard to handle." Fawcett also felt that some historical units were not as versatile or as powerful as their historical units due to the System 7 rules. "These are basically 'fast' rules that sacrifice some detail for playability." But Fawcett liked the rulebook, which he found "surprisingly understandable", although he disagreed with the rule that kept a turn to one hour in length, calling it "the worst flaw in the system [...] This is best ignored." He concluded with a strong recommendation, saying, "System 7 Napoleonics is versatile, inexpensive, and enjoyable. Definitely a good investment for a Napoleonic gamer or for those interested in becoming one."

== Awards ==
System 7 Napoleonics won the H.G. Wells award for Best Historical Figure Series and Best Miniatures Rules of 1979.
