= Tom Meier =

American sculptor and game designer

Tom Meier is a sculptor, a founding partner of Ral Partha Enterprises, and the winner of numerous awards for the design and sculpture of historical, fantasy and science fiction gaming miniatures.

Meier began sculpting professionally at the age of 15 and won his first H.G. Wells award just two years later. His earliest work was in the bulky style of Heritage Miniatures for whom he briefly worked. After the founding of Ral Partha in 1975, he was inspired by the art in fables and fairy tales and developed a style which emphasized beauty and natural proportion. A second lasting contribution was the popularization of sculpting in two-part ribbon epoxy putty designed for automotive repair. Commonly known as "green stuff," the epoxy held detail better than traditional media. Between 1977 and 1992 Tom's work won more than two dozen awards and he was inducted into the Origins Hall of Fame in 1991. In 1988, he left Ral Partha to start up his own company, Thunderbolt Mountain and does commission work for large and small game manufacturers.

== Artistry ==
Meier's signature lines include:

- Ral Partha Fantasy Line, ES/01-xxx Personalities and Things that Go Bump in the Night 25mm miniatures
- Ral Partha AN/35-xxx The Hoplites 25mm miniatures included Greeks, Carthaginians, Persians, Gauls, Early Republic Romans and Macedonians .
- Ral Partha 11/42-xxx 1200 A.D. 25mm miniatures included Vikings, English, French, Spanish, Moorish, Mongol, and Sung Chinese soldiers.
- Ral Partha E-xxx Wizards, Warriors and Warlocks 25mm miniatures included some of Meier's earliest work
- Ral Partha GG-xxx Galactic Grenadiers: Strike Force Alpha 25mm miniatures
- Ral Partha S/97-xxx Partha Personalities, and lines of 25mm miniature dungeon accessories (D/97-xxx) and weapons (D/97-5xx).
- Ral Partha 15/54-xxx Condotitieri 25mm miniatures, a line of Renaissance era figures.
- Ral Partha 88-xxx The Colonials which included 25mm miniatures for the Anglo-Zulu War, Northwest Frontier, and the Sudan Campaign.
- Thunderbolt Mountain 25mm Dragons.
- Thunderbolt Mountain 25mm Arthurians.
- Thunderbolt Mountain 30mm High Elves.
- Thunderbolt Mountain 30mm Wood Elves.
- Thunderbolt Mountain 30mm Goblins.
- Thunderbolt Mountain 30mm Humans.
- Thunderbolt Mountain 30mm Savage and Sparkle.
- Thunderbolt Mountain 1/48 scale French and Indian War.
- Fox Miniatures 1/48 scale American Airborne and German Grenadiers.
- Dreamland Toyworks Mythos Buddies, novelties designed by John Kovalic.

Meier also contributed to:

- Ral Partha 98-xxx The Adventurers 25mm miniatures.
- Ral Partha 01-3xx 3-Stage Characters line which consisted of 25mm miniatures depicting three aspects of the a single character's game career.
- Ral Partha Advanced Dungeons and Dragons figures 10-56x Battlesystem Brigades (25mm), 11-9xx Battlesystem Brigades (15mm), Adventurers 11-0xx and monsters (11-4xx).
- Ral Partha Battletech Mechs and vehicles miniatures 20-8xx
- Lance and Laser Pendragon (with Sandra Garrity)
- Dark Sword Miniatures Larry Elmore Masterworks.
- Dark Sword Miniatures Visions of Fantasy.
- Dark Sword Miniatures George R.R. Martin Masterworks.
- Dark Sword Miniatures Kieth Parkinson Masterworks.

== Awards ==
Origins Awards / H.G. Wells Awards

- 1977 - Best Fantasy Figure Series (Ral Partha ES/01-xxx Fantasy Line).
- 1978 - Best Historical Figure Series (Ral Partha 11/42-xxx 1200 A.D.).
- 1978 - Best Fantasy or Science Fiction Figure Series - Fantasy Collectors Series (Ral Partha CS/02-xxx).
- 1979 - Best Fantasy or Science Fiction Figure Series - Collectibles (Ral Partha CS/02-xxx).
- 1980 - Best Historical Figure Series - Condottieri (Ral Partha 15/54-xxx).
- 1980 - Best Fantasy or Science Fiction Figure Series - Personalities (Ral Partha ES/01-xxx).
- 1981 - Best Historical Figure Series - Condottieri (Ral Partha 15/54-xxx).
- 1982 - Best Fantasy or Science Fiction Figure Series - Personalities & Things That Go Bump In The Night (Ral Partha ES/01-xxx).
- 1983 - Best Vehicular Series - 25mm Dwarf Steam Cannon (Ral Partha 02-030).
- 1984 - Best Historical Figure Series - 25mm Colonials (Ral Partha 88-xxx Zulus and Northwest Frontier).
- 1984 - Best Fantasy or Science Fiction Figure Series - 25mm Personalities (Ral Partha ES/01-xxx).
- 1986 - Best Vehicular or Accessory Series - BattleTech Mech. (Ral Partha 20-8xx with Bob Charrette and Julie Guthrie).
- 1988 - Best Fantasy or Science Fiction Figure Series - TSR's AD&D Series (Ral Partha 11-xxx with Dennis Mize).
- 1988 - Best Vehicular or Accessory Series - BattleTech Mechs (Ral Partha 20-8xx with Bob Charrette and Julie Guthrie).
- 1989 - Best Fantasy or Science Fiction Figure Series - Dragonlance Heroes Line (Ral Partha 10-502 with Dennis Mize and Richard Kerr).
- 1989 - Best Vehicular Miniatures Series - BattleTech Mechs and Vehicles (Ral Partha 20-xxx with Dave Summers, Sandy Garrity, Richard Kerr, Bob Charrette, and Julie Guthrie).
- 1991 - Best Fantasy or Science Fiction Figure Series - Shadowrun (Ral Partha 20-5xx with Dennis Mize and Dave Summers).
- 1991 - Best Vehicular Miniatures Series - BattleTech Mechs & Vehicles (Ral Partha 20-xxx with Jeff Wilhelm, Dave Summers, Sandy Garrity, Richard Kerr, Bob Charrette, and Julie Guthrie).
- 1991 - Best Historical Miniatures Series - Pendragon Knight and Lady Set (Lance & Laser P 01-08, 4001-4008)
- 1992 - Best Vehicular Miniatures Series - BattleTech Mechs & Vehicles (Ral Partha 20-8xx with Jeff Wilhelm, Dave Summers, Sandy Garrity, Richard Kerr, Bob Charrette, and Julie Guthrie).

Strategist Club "Creativity in Wargaming" Award

- 1978 - Outstanding Miniature Figure Line - Fantasy Collectors Series (Ral Partha CS/02-xxx).
- 1979 - Outstanding Miniatures Figure Line - Condottieri (Ral Partha 15/54-xxx).

The Courier Award

- 1979 - Best Historical Miniature Line - Condottieri (Ral Partha 15/54-xxx).

Games Day Awards

- 1979 - Best Range SF/F Figures - Personalities and Things that Go Bump in the Night (Ral Partha ES/01-xxx).
- 1980 - Best Figures Range, Historical - 1200 A.D. (Ral Partha 11-xxx).
