= The Courier (magazine) =

American game magazine

- Editor: Dick Bryant
- Categories: Miniature Wargaming
- Frequency: Monthly
- Founded: 1968
- Final issue Number: 2005; 91
- Company: Legio X
- Country: United States
- Website: The Courier Magazine

The Courier was, prior to its demise in 2005, the oldest game magazine in existence.

== History ==
Started in 1968 by war-gaming enthusiasts Dick Bryant and Bob Beattie as a newsletter of the New England Wargamers Association, The Courier underwent a glossy reboot starting in 1979. Dubbed "America's Foremost Miniatures Wargaming Magazine", The Courier featured regular columns and articles on how to collect, assemble, paint, play with, and make historically accurate miniatures.

In 2005, publisher Legio X issued The Courier #91, the last issue of the magazine. Its content became part of Historical Miniature Gamer Magazine.

== Reception ==
Forrest Johnson reviewed The Courier in The Space Gamer No. 34. Johnson commented that "A historical miniatures gamer who does not subscribe to The Courier just isn't with it.'"

The Courier was awarded the Origins Award for "Special Award for Outstanding Achievement of 1987".

The Courier was inducted into the Academy of Adventure Gaming Arts & Design's Hall of Fame in 1997.
