= RAFM Company =

Game company

RAFM Company, Inc.
- Industry: Wargaming; Role-playing games
- Headquarters: Brantford, Ontario, Canada
- Key people: Sculptors: Bob Murch; Stephen Koo; Bill Schwarz; James Van Schaik; Primary: John Laing; Jack Van Schaik
- Products: Miniature figures

RAFM Company, Inc. of Brantford, Ontario is a producer of miniatures, reference materials, and board games. RAFM has produced games, reference materials, and their own lines of miniature figures in 15 mm, 20 mm, 25 mm, and 28 mm scales since 1977. Their games concern soldiers, adventurers and monsters inspired by both history and fiction. Their products are sold at gaming conventions, in hobby shops, and by mail order for use in role playing games, wargaming, dioramas, competitive painting, and collecting. The company is best known for its Baker Company (WW2 Rules & Miniatures 20mm), Charlie Company (Vietnam Rules & Miniatures 20mm), Death in the Dark (28mm Fantasy Board Game), RAFM historical miniatures, Call of Cthulhu miniatures, fantasy miniatures (featuring the Iron Lords line of 28mm figures), Space: 1889 figures, historical source materials, and pewter dice.

== History ==
RAFM was founded in 1977 by a group of wargaming enthusiasts in Paris, Ontario to publish a set of miniature battles rules called The Universal Soldier: Wargame Rules for Ancient, Medieval and Pike and Shot (1977) by Patrick Jenkins, John Laing, Colin McClelland, and Paul Sharpe. Initially, RAFM focused on publications for historical gaming, particularly the wars of the 18th and 19th centuries. Like their contemporaries at Ral Partha Enterprises and Grenadier Models Inc., the company turned their focus to the rapidly expanding market in fantasy games. Bob Murch began sculpting for RAFM in the early 1980s and remained their primary sculptor until he began Pulp Figures in 2002. The company started as a partnership among the principal owners until John Laing moved to England in 1987 and left the partnership. Jack Van Schaik has been the president and part-owner of the company since the beginning. In 1999, RAFM Company Inc. became a subsidiary of Van Schaik's Silver Fox Productions and the RAFM headquarters was moved to Brantford, Ontario. In addition to their own lines, RAFM was the long-time caster and Canadian distributor for Ral Partha Enterprises, Citadel Miniatures, and currently distribute figures of Reaper Miniatures of Denton, Texas.

In 2025, Silver Fox and RAFM ceased business.

== Miniatures and publications ==
RAFM's miniatures are typically unmarked and in order to be identified must be matched to pictures and descriptions in product catalogs. Catalogs were produced in 1986 Canada, 1986 U.S., 1987 Canada, 1989–90 U.S., 1994, 1996 Update #1, 2005, 2006, and 2009.

RAFM was also the Canadian caster and distributor of Ral Partha Enterprises and Citadel Miniatures, carrying most of their lines. RAFM tended to preserve older manufacturer's codes. For example, when Ral Partha switched to all numeric product codes in early 1980, RAFM continued production with the originals. In the 1990s RAFM distributed Frei Korps 15's Yellow Ribbon line of 15mm figures for the American Wild West (YR01-YR18), another series for the American Civil War (7000-7011). A one time sculptor for RAFM, Bob Ridolfi's sculpts and others are licensed by Reaper Miniatures for distribution in Canada. RAFM also produced miniatures for GHQ and Martian Metals in the 1980s. Contracts were also signed with Dream Pod 9's Heavy Gear, Global Games and Palladium's Rifts.

Unless otherwise noted, RAFM's miniatures were designed by Bob Murch and produced in 25mm scale. Other sculptors included Murch's apprentice Stephen Koo, Carol Moyer, James Johnson, and Bill Schwarz who specializes in the engines and vehicles of war throughout history. In recent years the boss' sons James and Brock Van Schaik have become accomplished sculptors.

=== Fantasy miniatures ===
- Reptiliads (RE001-RE106, renumbered in 1988, 3001-3011).
- Reptiliads Box Sets (RE010, RE011).
- Reptiliads: Legion of the Iron Tanth (3012-3019).
- Reptiliads: Battle Sport Warriors (3021-3026).
- Shadow & Steel (2901-2904).
- Shadow & Steel Box Sets (2001-2004).
- Shadow & Steel Adventure Sets (3728-3732, 3089, 3099)
- The Dark Lords' Regiment of Blood/Regiments of Blood (3101-3112, 4540-4545).
- Mercenaries (4550-4553).
- The Durnanoth (4560-4561).
- Skin and Grin (4461), Ragoyin the Enforcer (4482).
- Tribe of the Midnight Sun (4040-4049).
- Accessories (4580-4587).
- Legions of Darkness: Orcs (3201-3219).
- Orcs of the Crimson Horde (3220-3225).
- Orc Marines (4520-4523).
- Custom Characters (CC01-CC24).
- Wanderers and Warriors (singles 3801-3820, 3-pack 3801-3809).
- Um Cijo: Grassland Warriors (3030-3035).
- Knights of the Silver Sword (3050-3056).
- Fantasy Chariots (3057, 3077, 3098).
- Elves of the Isles (3070-3076).
- High Elven Lords (3837-3842).
- Dark Elves (4001-4006, 4530-4539).
- Dark Elf Armies (3040-3045).
- Dwarves of the Flaming Forge (3090-3097, 4510-4518).
- Barbarian Warriors (3821-3826).
- Night Callers: Bone Warriors (3871-3876).
- The Necro Drake Lord's Bone Warriors (4483-4499).
- Fantasy Box Sets Hartha the Death Machine (2005), Bone Warrior Army (2006), Dream Warriors (2007), Dream Dragon (2008), Vasmillion the Vile (2009), Skeleton War Wagon (2010), Fiery Serpent of Terror by Stephen Koo (2013), Necro Drake by Stephen Koo (2014).
- Lich Kings/Lich Masters/Lich (3718-3744).
- Elemental Dragons Box Sets Earth/Air Dragon Elemental (2015), Fire/Water Dragon Elementals (2016)
- Fantasy Companies: Men at Arms (3060-3066).
- Women of the Ninth Meridian (3694-3699) by Stephen Koo.
- Fantasy Player Characters(3901-3936, 4550-4553)/Wizards (3708, 3750, 3751).
- Wizards of Law (3827-3832).
- Sculptors at Large (Bob Ridolph Fantasy 3501-3503)(Trickett's Fantasy 3400-3484).
- Giants, Dragons, Bring on the Big Guys.../Dragons/Giants (3713, 3714, 3720, 3721, 3725).
- Troll Fiends/Trolls (3719-3727).
- Elementals (3833-3836).
- Angels and Archangels/Angels (3300-3305).
- The Fallen (3312-3317).
- Death Angels (3895-3899).
- Myth & Legends (3306-3311).
- Minotaurs (3706, 3707, 3712).

=== Horror miniatures ===
- Call of Cthulhu (2901-2982, 2990-2991).
- Call of Cthulhu Boxed Sets (2011, 2012, 2030).
- The Cursed Ones (3601-3610) by James Johnson.
- The Monsters of Chaos (3601-3621, 3009-3017, 3654-3657) by Stephen Koo.
- The Monster Mash (3401-3413) by Carol Moyer.
- Demons of Darkness (3701-3712).
- Monsters Do the Tokyo STOMP! (1801-1806) by Stephen Koo.
- Fantastique Noir Vampyres (3957-3968).
- Tomb Denizens/Wraiths & Horrors (3715-3717).
- Ghosts (3848-3853).
- Necromancers (3877-3882).
- Vampyre Lords (3883-3888).
- Crypt Ghouls (3889-3894).
- Death Angels (3895-3899, 4000).
- Gargoyles (3948-3956).
- Scarecrows (3854-3859).
- Witches (3860-3865).
- Ghosts in our Time (3838-3853).

=== Science fiction miniatures ===
- The Outcasts Post-Apocalyptic (OC01-OC11).
- Science Fiction Vehicles (SV01-SV09, 15mm) formerly manufactured by Martian Metals.
- Space 1889 Adversaries Box Sets (1821, 1841, 1842).
- Traveller: The New Era (ships 5801-5813, crew 5850-5861).
- Mekton Jovian Chronicles Giant Robots (1001-1021, 1051-1056, 1070-1081) by Stephen Koo.
- Star-Khan Terran Fed Reaction Marines (5011-5025).
- Star-Khan Cyb-Orcs (5051-5056).
- Star-Khan Destructor Commandos (5030-5037).
- Star-Khan Marine Vehicles (5019, 5020, 5024, 5025).
- Star-Khan Accessories (5026-5028, 5057-5058).
- Space Mercs & Privateers (5061-5066) by Bob Ridolfi.
- Universal Soldier Xtreme (USX): Modern Day Heroes (2801-2854, 2880, 9001) by James Van Schaik, Brock Van Schaik, Bob Murch, and Werner Klocke.
- USX Box Sets (2040-2050).

=== Historical miniatures ===
- Knights in Plate Pike and Shot (1400–1486), redesigned by Carol Moyer.
- Armies of the Hellenistic Period Alexander the Great, Successors, Maccabean Jewish, Indo-Bactrians, Thracians, Scythians, Accessory Packs (AH001-AH105).
- Flint and Feather Colonial America (IN01-IN45).
- Armies of the Caesars Imperial Rome (RA01-RA60).
- Jack Tar 19th century, Age of Sail (JT01-JT014) for Privateers & Gentlemen by Fantasy Games Unlimited.
- All the Kings Men Seven Years' War (6151-6162).
- Blue and Gray American Civil War (6601-6641).
- Boots and Saddles American Indian Wars (6700-6711).
- British Colonials: Riel Rebellion 1885 (6720-6732).
- Siege Equipment Ancient and Medieval (SE1 - SE-35), designed by Bill Schwarz.
- Command Decision Series Game 1/26 World War II Ordinance (6850-6887), designed by Bill Schwarz.
- Platoon 20 (20mm World War II and Vietnam Conflict figures, which RAFM renamed Baker Company and Charlie Company respectively, and distributed under license). The Platoon 20 line was originally produced by Model Figures & Hobbies/Plastiform (Cameron Robinson), later acquired by East Riding Miniatures (Tony Barr) around 2004, and is currently owned and produced by **East Front Miniatures**.

=== Publications ===
- 001 The Universal Soldier: Wargame Rules for Ancient, Medieval and Pike and Shot by Patrick Jenkins, John Laing, Colin McClelland, and Paul Sharpe (1977).
- 002 Napoleonic Armies Volumes I and II (in one volume) by Ray Johnson and Dave Jack (1978, Hardcover).
- 003 Napoleonic Armies Volumes I and II (in one volume) by Ray Johnson and Dave Jack (1978, Softcover).
- 004 Unit Organizations of the American Civil War by Richard J. Zimmermann (1986).
- 005 The Bavarian and Westphalian Armies 1799–1815 translated by George Nafziger (1981).
- 006 The Russian Army 1800–1815 by George Nafziger (1983).
- 007 The British Military 1803–1815 by S.J. Park and G.F. Nafziger (1983).
- 008 Reptiliad History Book by John Laing and Colin McClelland (1981), republished as The Reptiliads: Their History, Society and Military System (1983)
- 009 Prussian Landwehr and Landsturm 1813–1815 by Peter Hofschöer (1984).
- 010 Battlecry of the Reptiliads by Bob Murch, Susan Crane, and Colin McClelland (1988).
- 011 Battle of Batoche
- 012 Lurpa Playing Field & Lurpa Cards by Bob Murch (1988).
- 015 Charlie Company: Infantry Combat in Vietnam, 1965–1972 by Greg Novak and John Reeves (1986)
- 016 USX Modern Day Heroes Rule Book (2008).
- 020 Yellow Ribbon: Miniature Rules for Indian Wars by Greg Novak (1988, revised 1989)
- 021 And Continually Wear the Blue: A Short Guide to the U.S. Army & the 'Indian Wars' 1850–90 by Mike Gilbert and Greg Novak (1988, revised 1989).
- 022 The War of Independence in the North
- 023 Remember the Maine, and the Hell with Spain by Greg Novak (1990) expansion for Johnny Reb..
- 047 Death in the Dark (Rule Book) by Tom Frank, James Van Schaik, and Lee Van Schaik (1988).
- 4500 Death in the Dark (Board Game).
- Empire, Eagle & Lions magazine.
- AS-1 Iron On Hex Transfers 1" Hex
- AS-2 Iron On Hex Transfers 2" Hex
- AS-3 Iron On Hex Transfers 3" Hex
- AS-4 Universal Soldier Unit Sheets.
