= Ral Partha Enterprises =

Miniature manufacturing company

Ral Partha Legacy Ltd.
- Industry: Wargaming; Role-playing games
- Founded: 1975; 51 years ago
- Headquarters: Cincinnati, Ohio, United States
- Key people: Sculptors: Tom Meier; Dennis Mize; Julie Guthrie; Robert N. Charrette; Sandra Garrity; Richard Kerr; Dave Summers; Presidents: Glenn E. Kidd; Chuck Crain; Jack Hesselbrock; Michael Noe
- Products: miniature figures

Ral Partha Enterprises, Inc. was an American manufacturer of metal miniature figures founded in 1975 in Cincinnati, Ohio. It produced historical and fantasy figures in several scales for use in role-playing games, wargaming, dioramas, miniature painting, and collecting. The company became known for its historical figures, the Fantasy Collector's series, and licensed miniatures for TSR, Inc.'s Advanced Dungeons & Dragons and FASA's BattleTech.

Ral Partha began as a basement enterprise established by a group of wargamers and centered on the work of Tom Meier, who was 16 years old at the time. The company expanded alongside the growing popularity of board games and role-playing games, and by 1982 its products were sold worldwide. Meier became a freelance sculptor in 1988 and retained the copyrights to much of his work for the company. He later operated Thunderbolt Mountain Miniatures, which produced dioramas, 54 mm figures, and fantasy miniatures. Other notable Ral Partha sculptors included Dennis Mize, Julie Guthrie, Sandra Garrity, Robert N. Charrette, and Dave Summers.

The owners sold Ral Partha to FASA in 1998, and the company was among the assets acquired by WizKids in 2000. In 2001, its production assets were reorganized as Iron Wind Metals, LLC, based in Cincinnati. Iron Wind Metals reacquired the dormant Ral Partha trademarks in 2015 and relaunched the name as a division producing new and archived miniature lines for the Chaos Wars setting. In July 2020, Iron Wind Metals retired the Ral Partha division and licensed its fantasy and historical miniature lines to Ral Partha Legacy Ltd., the owner of Chaos Wars. Ral Partha Legacy also obtained a license to produce Tom Meier's Thunderbolt Mountain Miniatures lines. Iron Wind Metals continues to produce miniatures for former FASA properties, including BattleTech and Shadowrun.

== Licensees and distributors ==
=== United States ===
In 1980 Ral Partha licensed select designs to Rawcliffe Pewter, a long-time producer of cast metal art. The pewter versions of Ral Partha sculpts were typically bare-metal with a satin finish and decorated with glass jewels. In time, a division of the company called Partha Pewter was established to produce directly for the giftware market.

=== Canada ===
Ral Partha established a licensing agreement with RAFM, a miniatures manufacturer in Paris, Ontario, Canada in 1980. The two companies have had a long-term working relationship which lasted well into the 1990s.

=== Great Britain ===
In 1979 Citadel Miniatures was formed by Games Workshop as a miniatures production shop to produce their own figures and to distribute Ral Partha figures in Britain. Citadel Miniatures attempted to establish a U.S. division in 1982 with Ral Partha as the local manufacturer. The partnership was short lived and in 1984 Games Workshop established their own U.S. subsidiary and became a direct competitor. The Citadel Miniatures U.S. products were brought under the Ral Partha logo and marketed as Ral Partha Imports. In 1985 the import lines included the FTx-xx Fantasy Tribes, FAx-xx Fantasy Adventurer, FF/31-xxx Fiend Factory, FS/32-xx Fantasy Special, the popular WF-xx Weird Fantasy series with whimsical themes, FMM-xx Fantasy Mysterious Miniatures, and LB-xx Tabletop's Laser Burn line of space marines. Historical lines included Romans AR-xx, Dark Ages DA-xx, Medievals M-xxx and Samurai SAM-xx. (Note: Unless otherwise noted, the designs discussed were produced in 25 mm scale.) At least two figures (FTT 3 Troll hurling rock and FTT 4 Troll in chainmail with scimitar) were sculpted by Tom Meier while visiting England in 1981.

In 1986 Minifigs gained the rights to manufacture and distribute Ral Partha's fantasy range in Britain. The following year Ral Partha dropped Citadel Miniatures' historical lines and began to distribute Denizen Miniatures' dwarves (33-xxx), orcs (34-xxx), 36-xxx Legion of the Damned skeletons, and 39-xxx Fantastic Adventurers.

=== Continental Europe ===
By 1989, Jeux Descartes of Paris gained the rights to distribute Ral Partha figures in continental Europe. Some early Ral Partha advertisements erroneously give the name as "Jeaux Descartes." The relationship was on-going in 1997, but was probably severed when FASA purchased Ral Partha the following year.

=== Australia ===
In the 1980s and 1990s, Ral Partha products were distributed in Australia by Military Simulations of Moorabbin, Victoria, and then Bentleigh, Victoria.

== Product codes ==
Only a product code marked Ral Partha's early packaging and customers required a contemporary catalog in order to identify the miniature. In late 1979 the company switched from product codes that used descriptive letter and number codes to a numeric system. For example, in the series Personalities and Things that Go Bump in the Night, ES-001 Evil Wizard, casting spell became 01-001, and the first figure of the 15th century Renaissance series 1501 Command Set became 54-001. The change was not universal. Ral Partha used letter codes for Citadel Miniatures and Denizen Miniatures in their line of Ral Partha Imports until 1992. Ral Partha's international partners used their own systems. RAFM of Canada used the descriptive product codes as late as 1984. Jeux Descartes initially used Ral Partha's numeric codes on packaging of their own design, but new lines were introduced selectively and given codes sequential to their own series. As a result, product codes often differ depending on whether the miniatures were produced in the United States, Canada, or Europe.

Throughout the company's history, figures were modified to improve reproducibility, unpopular designs were re-sculpted, and existing product codes were used for new designs. A common cause of modification was a level of detail or animation which challenged the casting technology. An industry-wide reorientation of scale from 25 mm to 30 mm in the late 1990s, and interest in removing artist's royalties from lines, also prompted new sculpts of existing lines.

Few of Ral Partha's miniatures were marked with product codes and the company's advertisements and catalogs remain a critical resource for collectors. Advertisements by Ral Partha and its British and Canadian partners appear in most editions of TSR, Inc.'s Dragon and Games Workshop's White Dwarf magazines. Product catalogs were published annually from 1978 to 1997, and in 2000. The 1998 and 1999 catalogs were combined into a single issue. Ral Partha also released Christmas catalogs in 1982, 1983 and 1984, an Imports catalog in 1984, historical miniatures catalogs in 1985 and 1996, a 2000 Direct Mail Catalog, and sporadically released updated order forms which listed all the figures in production. In the late 1996 Ral Partha augmented their catalogs with a webpage which highlighted popular products and new releases. After the formation of Iron Wind Metals in 2001, an online catalog and electronic order forms entirely replaced printed catalogs.

== Company history ==
Ral Partha Enterprises was formed in 1975 when Glenn E. Kidd, Tom Meier and Rich Smethurst set out to produce Meier's sculptures. Meier pioneered the sculpture of miniatures in a two-part epoxy putty designed for automotive repair. The epoxy held detail better than traditional media and rest of the miniature industry adopted its use. When mixed together, the blue and yellow components of the putty formed a green putty which gave rise to the term "Greens" for the original artist's work. Finding themselves still short of funds, the three enlisted Marc Rubin, Chuck Crain, and Jack Hesselbrock as partners. The six investors pooled US$3,000 to purchase the equipment necessary to produce Meier's sculptures.

The company had its origins in the established hobby of historical wargaming, but the company's rapid growth was fostered by the popularity of role-playing games. The company was named Ral-Partha after a particularly successful wizard character created by Tom's young friend John Winkler. The character was a notoriously hard bargainer whose shrewdness was exemplified by the catch phrase "What's it worth to you?" It was hoped that the fledgling company would have similar good fortune. Like their popular line of "3-stage characters," Ral Partha has had a trio of aspects. The first was Winkler's gaming character, depicted as ES-001 Evil Wizard, casting spell. "Ral" Winkler himself became one of the company's chief casters. Lastly, "Ral" was the company's totemic progenitor credited with collaborative projects and depicted as 10–412 Lord of the Balrogs.

Products were originally cast in the basement of 3642 Hyde Park Avenue, in the Fairfax neighborhood of Cincinnati, the home of the company's first president, Glenn E. Kidd. In the spring of 1978, the company established a factory at 3726 Lonsdale Street in the Norwood section of Cincinnati. At the time of the move, the address was erroneously rendered as 2732 and 2736 Lonsdale, but there is no 2700 block of that street. Small stickers were applied to the 1978 product catalog to correct the address. Those stickers have typically fallen off in the intervening years. By November 1980 Ral Partha moved to a larger industrial space at 5938 Carthage Court, where it, and the Iron Wind Metals production facilities remained until 2014. Iron Wind Metals has its offices and production facilities at 10437 Chester Rd in Woodlawn, Ohio.

Ral Partha's formative years were the late 1970s, when the company was a part-time basement enterprise producing the art of a teenage sculptor for a nascent gaming market. In 1979, the company became a full-time endeavor with industrial space and two professional sculptors designing products for multiple themes made popular by the rapidly expanding gaming market. The number of sculptors and catalog of miniatures grew rapidly. In the mid-1980s, the preponderance of work moved from Ral Partha's sculptors' designs to manufacturing under license for nationally marketed games. In the short run, the move was economically beneficial. However, the lack of product diversity left the company vulnerable to the marketing decisions of clients for whom miniatures were a minor interest. Between 2001 and 2014, Ral Partha was an unused trademark caught up in the mergers and intellectual property negotiations between large game producers. Since 2001 the focus of Iron Wind Metals has been on existing product lines, Battletech licensed figures, and manufacturing for partner companies who carryout their own designs, marketing and distribution. In 2014 the production and productive capacities were reunited under Ral Partha Enterprises, a division of Iron Wind Metals.

=== Basement enterprise, 1975–1978 ===
The young company received early encouragement from the sale of its entire stock at Gen Con 1976, a convention of gaming enthusiasts. Ral Partha's lines and customer base grew quickly and they regularly won multiple categories of the Origins Award. Ral Partha's figures were popular with historical wargamers, but fans of fantasy themed role-playing games like TSR, Inc.'s Dungeons & Dragons accounted for the majority of their sales. Meier's sculpts tended to carry greater detail than many of his contemporaries, but some early products presented challenges to the casting process.

One of Tom Meier's earliest lines was the Fantasy Line, which included about two dozen figures in late 1976. Meier's ES18 Adventuress is credited as being the first female character for role-playing games. The fantasy line was renamed ES/01-xxx Personalities and Things that Go Bump in the Night in 1978, and Meier augmented the line throughout the 1980s.

As early as 1976, Meier had begun a series of soldiers from Classical antiquity which were collected together as AN/35-xxx The Hoplites. By 1978 the line was essentially complete and included Greeks, Carthaginians, Persians, Gauls, Early Republic Romans and Macedonians. Another series begun by Meier in 1976 was a line of 11th-century knights and footmen called 11/42-xxx 1200 A.D.. The series included Vikings, English, French, Spanish, Moorish, Mongol, and Sung Chinese soldiers.

Ral Partha put E-xxx Wizards, Warriors and Warlocks into production in 1976, 1977, and 1979. The line included some of Meier's earliest work and much of it was executed in the style of Heritage Models, for whom he had briefly worked. The E-xxx series was retired in 1980, but portions of it were re-released in 1995 as part of the 19-xxx Ral Partha Remembered line commemorating the company's 20th anniversary.

In 1978 Ral Partha acquired The Old Guard's Legions of the Petal Throne line of figures for TSR, Inc.'s Empire of the Petal Throne, a role-playing game based on M. A. R. Barker's world of Tékumel. Ral Partha retained the services of William Murray, the line's sculptor. Tom Meier and Brian Apple made contributions to the series (T, Y, P, M, NH-xxx) in 1979, but it was discontinued later that year.

As early as 1978, Ral Partha produced three series of 15 mm historical miniatures sculpted by George Freeman of Dayton, Ohio. They included Napoleonic-era figures N-xxx Days of the Empire, AW-xxx American Civil War, and AK-xxx Desert Rats, modeling the North African Campaign of World War II. Ann Gallup also contributed an AC-xxx series to the American Civil War line. In 1979 Ral Partha added Freeman's 25 mm W-xxx Waterloo Collector's Series, but all of Freeman and Gallup's figures were discontinued in 1980. George Freeman's 15mm Napoleonics figures are available from Monday Knight Productions (see external links below).

Ral Partha's first venture into science fiction was Meier's 1978 line of space marines and space aliens GG-xxx Galactic Grenadiers: Strike Force Alpha. Their release was in tandem with Gamescience's Strike Team Alpha, a set designed by Michael Scott Kurtick for Meier's Galactic Grenadiers. Other early lines included collectible 54 mm figures called S/97-xxx Partha Personalities and lines of 25 mm dungeon accessories (D/97-xxx) and weapons (D/97-5xx).

=== Producer of signature lines, 1979–1986 ===
In the summer of 1978, Meier began reworking the themes of the E-xxx series to create the CS/02-xxx Fantasy Collectors line of elves. Meier's lines were successful and he began sculpting full-time in 1979. The addition of dwarves in 1979 and goblins in 1980 almost entirely replaced the E-xxx series. Meier added halfings in 1982 and began a series of fantasy vehicles. The first was 02–030 Dwarf Steam Cannon, released in 1983. Meier's contribution to the series was completed when 02-078 The Warmachine and 02-020 The Elf Chariot were put into production in 1984.

Ral Partha hired Dennis Mize in 1979. With two full-time sculptors, Ral Partha's product lines increased rapidly. Mize's first project was H-xxx Royal Armies of the Hyborean Age to accompany a Fantasy Games Unlimited game of the same name, based on the world of Robert E. Howard's Conan the Barbarian. The Hyborean line was dropped in 1980, and Mize introduced 53-7xx The Samurai and a line of 15mm fantasy soldiers called 05-xxx Armies of Myth and Legend. His popular CN/13-xxx Children of the Night was begun by 1982 and expanded over the course of the next two years. In 1982 Mize and Meier created figures for small thematic box sets called 98-xxx The Adventurers. Mize also added to and revised Meier's The Hoplites and 1200 A.D. lines in 1984.

In 1979, Meier introduced 15/54-xxx Condotitieri, a line of Renaissance-era figures. The first offerings were Imperialists, to which he added Swiss and Turks in 1980. Meier expanded the historical ranges with the 1983 addition of 88-xxx The Colonials. Sculpts for the Anglo-Zulu War were augmented in 1984 with figures for the Northwest Frontier and the Sudan Campaign in 1985.

Ral Partha entered the game market in 1980 with the release of 99–001 Witch's Caldron, 99-002 Caverns Deep, 99-003 Final Frontier, and 99-004 Galactic Grenadiers, skirmish games designed by Glenn E. Kidd and Marc Rubin. "Galactic Grenadiers" included miniatures from the GG-xxx series. 15 mm figures from Final Frontiers were released in 1982 as 08-xxx Star Warriors. By 1982, the presidency of the company passed from Glenn E. Kidd to Jack Hesselbrock. The lines of 15 mm fantasy figures were taken out of production and the figures from the Caverns Deep and Witch's Cauldron games were incorporated into 98-xxx The Adventurers in 1983. Ral Partha returned to the board game market in 1985 when they joined with Leggett Games Inc. to publish Fortress, a skirmish-based board game which incorporated lead Ral Partha miniatures. That same year the company launched 77-xxx Partha Paints and Dragonscale metallic cremes which were packaged with dragon figures.

In the spring of 1983 Ral Partha began publishing a four-page newsletter entitled The Partha Pipeline which was a house fanzine with articles generated by staff and friends. A typical issue included "Letters to Ral" where the company's semi-mythical progenitor would answer reader's questions, scenarios for battles with Ral Partha figures, and new releases by Ral Partha and those which they distributed for RAFM. The Partha Pipeline continued for three more years until ending its first series in 1986. A second series using the same name would be revived in 1999.

Julie Guthrie began freelance sculpting for Ral Partha in 1983. Her first line was the 02-9xx All Things Dark and Dangerous. She worked with Meier and Mize on 98-xxx The Adventurers. Later that year, box sets of 10-3xx The Best of Ral Partha and Julie Guthrie's 96-xxx Elfquest figures for Chasosium's Elfquest game were put into production. Guthrie expanded the All Things Dark and Dangerous line in 1984, 1985, and 1986. In 1984 she joined Meier and Mize to develop a short series of miniatures (95-xxx) for Nova Games' Lost Worlds series of combat books. In 1985 Guthrie contributed two sculpts of unicorns to PO-3xx Once Upon a Time series designed for the giftware market, cast in lead-free alloy, and marketed as "Partha Pewter" by Rawcliffe Pewter. Their work with pewter allowed Ral Partha's mold-makers to develop the technical expertise necessary to transition to non-lead alloys in the early 1990s.

Robert N. Charrette joined Ral Partha in 1984 and contributed to Meier's The Hoplites, 1200 A.D., and CS/02-xxx Collector Series lines. In 1985, Charrette inaugurated figures for Chaosium's RuneQuest and a line of pulp adventurers. The line was initially called "20th Century Plus", but was later renamed 20-xxx The Roaring Twenties. Charrette revisited a line of figures he sculpted in 1979 to accompany Fantasy Games Unlimited's Gangster!. Charrette updated the line to include new cinematic themes such as the intrepid archaeologist. In 1986 Charrette introduced 53-9xx Bushido, a line of miniatures for Bushido, a game he authored and sculpted a line of figures for Fantasy Games Unlimited. In 1985, Bob Charrette began producing a line of miniature robot war machines for a game that was first called "Battledroids" and renamed BattleTech in 1986, for FASA's game of the same name. It was the beginning of a permanent relationship between the two companies that would eventually lead to Ral Partha's sale to FASA. Battletech products remain a leading product of Ral Partha's successor, Iron Wind Metals and Charrette continued on as creative development and authored several related novels.

In 1986 Ral Partha sculptors crafted 01-3xx 3-Stage Characters which consisted of three aspects with increasing amounts of arms and armor to represent a single adventurer's game career. The line was folded into the ES/01-xxx line in 1987. Because of their popularity with collectors and role-players, they regained status as a separate line and a place of prominence in the 1991 and subsequent catalogs.

=== Chaos Wars, 1986–1987 ===
At the same time that integrated campaign worlds like Games Workshop's Warhammer Fantasy Battle were showing early success, Ral Partha introduced the "Chaos Wars" theme into their 1986 and 1987 product lines. It was the first step toward unifying a collection of disparate themes into an integrated brand. In the 1986 catalog sculptors were no longer credited and a mythical "Ral Partha" rather than the president of the company addressed customers in the prologue. At about that same time, the Ral Partha staff had developed a four-page Rules According to Ral for medieval battles. A fantasy version by Bob Charrette, Rich Smethhurst, Marc Rubin, and Chuck Crain was released in 1987 as part of a boxed set Rules According to Ral: Chaos Wars. The Chaos Wars theme collected together numerous existing products, many from Meier's ES/01-xxx line, and their packaging was marked with stickers.

As part of the Chaos Wars product line the Partha Pipeline newsletter was transformed into the Ral Partha War Bulletin in January 1986. The War Bulletin followed much of the same format as the Pipeline but its focus was the Chaos Wars product line. Releases were sporadic and continued until at least the Spring of 1990.

The new initiative was to include 10-2xx Free Companies of Chaos Wars box sets, but large contracts to produce miniatures for other gaming companies became a higher priority and the Chaos Wars lines were appended to the CS/02-xxx Collector's Series. Among these sets were Charrette's popular Fangs of Fury beastmen, Tom Meier's Korg's Killers orcs, and Meier's Starbrow's Select elves. Having never fully materialized, the Chaos Wars theme was set aside in 1988 in order to give necessary attention to producing official Advanced Dungeons & Dragons Miniatures for TSR, Inc.'s Advanced Dungeons & Dragons game.

=== Producer of licensed lines, 1988–1995 ===
In 1988 Meier began his own company, Thunderbolt Mountain Miniatures, but continued to do freelance work for Ral Partha. Company president Chuck Crain hired Sandra L. Garrity, Dave Summers, and Richard Kerr as full-time sculptors to produce an official line of monsters and personalities for AD&D figures. The earliest figures included 10-56x Battlesystem Brigades (25 mm) which included an entire 25 mm military unit in for tabletop wargames, and adventurers (11-0xx) and monsters (11-4xx) for role-playing games. In 1990 Ral Partha launched 10-5xx Dragonlance and Dungeons & Dragons and 10-55x Forgotten Realms boxed sets. The line grew rapidly and 1991 saw the addition of box sets for 11-9xx Battlesystem Brigades (15 mm), 11-5xx Ravenloft and 10-54x Dark Sun game worlds. The 11-05x, 11-06x AD&D Personalities of heroes and villains was released in 1994, and additional figures for the Planescape, Ravenloft, and Forgotten Realms game worlds followed in 1995. By 1997 Ral Partha had also added figures for TSR, Inc.'s Dark Sun, Council of Wyrms, and Birthright game worlds. The breadth and earning potential of the Dungeons & Dragons franchise drove new releases and Ral Partha scrambled to acquire the sculpting talents of British and American sculptors, including Nick Bibby, Jeff Wilhelm, Bob Olley, Chris Atkin, Walter Vail, John M. Garrity, and Jim Johnson in 1992, and Chis Fitzpatrick and Geoff Valley by 1995.

By 1991 the 20-xxx BattleTech line had grown to include eleven box sets, and more than one hundred 'Mechs, Aerospace fighters, and ground vehicles. Ral Partha also produced 25 mm 20-9xx Mechwarriors depicting pilots, mechanics and guards for role-playing in the BattleTech game world. That same year, Ral Partha sculptors had begun crafting figures for FASA's game Shadowrun, a role-playing game set in a futuristic cyber-world. Shadowrun miniatures had previously been produced by Grenadier Miniatures. Ral Partha introduced their sculpts (20-5xx Shadowrun) in 1992.

The 12-xxx The All American Line of fighters, orcs, magic-users, undead, dwarves, and elves was released in 1991 and 1992. The name of the line appears to refer to the fact that all the figures were sculpted Ral Partha's four staff sculptors. Other new lines included Richard Kerr's 1992 futuristic tanks for Steve Jackson Games' Ogre and the introduction of the "69-xxx" series for White Wolf, Inc.'s Werewolf: The Apocalypse and Vampire: The Masquerade in late 1993. Figures for White Wolf, Inc.'s Mage: The Ascension followed soon after.

Initially, Ral Partha figures were cast from lead and tin alloy, but in 1993 New York legislators nearly passed a public health bill barring the use of lead in toys and miniatures. Despite the additional cost, numerous manufacturers anticipated parental concerns, similar legislation in other states, workplace safety, and began using white metal alloys. Ral Partha's staff had previously developed a lead-free alloy for their "Partha Pewter," a line of collectible figurines designed for the giftware market. In September 1993 they began using a trademarked white metal alloy they called Ralidium in all their products and its use marks a clear benchmark for dating old figures. The move away from lead was promoted in advertisements and bright red stickers on existing packaging. In time, New York Governor Mario Cuomo relented to hobbyists' concerns and exempted miniatures from the state's Public Health Law. However, the company never went back to lead. Ral Partha correctly anticipated the industry's movement away from lead, but the associated price increases came at a time when miniatures and role playing games were being eclipsed by collectible card games like Wizards of the Coast's 1993 hit Magic: The Gathering. In 1994 the company experimented with Partha Plastics. The move was made well after Citadel Miniatures' successful introduction of plastic and part-plastic figures, but the figures were not popular with Ral Partha's older customer base.

In 1993 Dennis Mize designed the "Titans of Terror" series which invoked the heroes and monsters of the horror films. The following year Mize conceptualized and sculpted 01-7xx Beastmasters, a line of carnivores and their trainers. The line was expanded the following year, and would be completed until 1998. That same year Ral Partha produced "Coins of the Realm," fantasy and historical coinage. In 1995 Ral Partha's sculptors crafted figures for Steve Jackson Games' Space Knight, and dioramas called Sculptors' Row, The Sterling Collection, and Encounters of the Imagination.

=== The trouble with wizards, 1996–2001 ===
During Jack Hesselbrock's second term as company president, he re-established a newsletter which he called the Ral Partha Gaming Club. Like its predecessors it addressed letters from customers and company news. The series ran for six issues from June 1996 to September 1997. In December of 1996 Ral Partha launched a website which hosted the newsletters and product ordering information. The newsletters reveal a number of licensing setbacks. The hobby market had moved away from roleplaying games and wargames and was rapidly becoming dominated by collectible card games like Wizards of the Coast's Magic: The Gathering. Steve Jackson Games' Ogre miniatures and all three White Wolf lines were discontinued in 1996. Bob Charrette's 18-xxx Runequest figures were discontinued the following year.

Since the late 1970s the gaming miniatures industry had undergone what collectors call "scale creep," an increase in size from 20 and 25 mm scales (i.e. height to the eyes of an upright human-sized figure) to 30 mm and 32 mm. By the late 1990s the move to larger figures by market leaders like Games Workshop of Great Britain had made it such that Ral Partha's sculpts of the 1970s and early 1980s appeared significantly smaller than others. In response to the shift in the market, Ral Partha began adding to Tom Meier's collector's series (CS/02-xxx) with a 30 mm scale Fantasy Armies line in a "British style" which tended to have oversized weapons, punk and Gothic fashions, and separate square bases. Chris Fitzpatrick designed a line of elves. Bob Olley produced new dwarves, goblins, trolls and ogres. Jeff Wilhelm created a series of skeletons. Jim Johnson's contributions were bands of humans known as Horse Lords, Savages, Reavers, and Tyrants. Sandra Garrity designed the Knights of the Legion of Justice A set of rules of the Fantasy Armies were developed by an outside work group called Ral Partha Publishing. The game was first introduced in the 1997 Ral Partha catalog flier as 14-001 Bloodstorm. Soon after the project was retitled Battlestorm and published in 1998. The game was advertised as the first volume of the "Fables Gamesystem," but no subsequent installments were issued.

Buoyed by the success of Magic:The Gathering, in 1997 Wizards of the Coast acquired TSR, Inc. and with it, control of the rights to Dungeons & Dragons miniatures. After an extension to their contract, Wizards of the Coast did not renew Ral Partha's license for Advanced Dungeons & Dragons miniatures and the figures went out of production at the end of 1998 These miniatures are highly sought after by collectors who believe that Wizards of the Coast had ordered the destruction of the master molds.

The loss of Dungeons & Dragons and other licenses meant that FASA's BattleTech figures became the majority of Ral Partha's revenue. Under threat of also losing those lines and the financial difficulties created by the changing hobby market, the owners of Ral Partha sold the company in 1998 to FASA and Lanier Hurdle and Mike Hurdle, owners of Zocchi Distribution, a hobby shop supplier. FASA gained sole ownership in the spring of 1999, and Ral Partha began to produce miniatures for FASA's Crimson Skies, Crucible: Conquest of the Final Realm, and VOR: The Maelstrom games. No sooner were these miniatures in stores when FASA ceased production of all their games.

In December 1999 Ral Partha launched The Partha Pipeline to announce new products for FASA's games, as well as house designs. At this time Ral Partha had an in-house design studio and a host of staff and free-lance sculptors which included Kev Adams, Jeff Grace, Behrle W. Hubboch III, Randy Kerr, Robert Kyde, Phil Lewis, Dennis Mize, Bob Olley, Tim Prow, Steve Saunders, C. Staples, Dave Summers, Jeff Wilhelm, John Winter. The second series of the Partha Pipeline ran until late 2000 when the Ral Partha assets faced another acquisition.

In January 2001 WizKids, a New Jersey–based producer of plastic collectible miniatures games, acquired the bulk of Ral Partha's assets as part of their purchase of FASA's BattleTech and Shadowrun games. WizKids purchased the rights to some figures from Ral Partha sculptors, but the bulk reverted to the artists. Meier retained his 15/54-xxx Condotitieri, 88-xxx The Colonials, and most of the CS/02-xxx Fantasy Collectors lines. Charrette remained in possession of his 53-9xx Bushido figures. Ral Partha continued to produce miniatures for the Battletech and Shadowrun gaming worlds. Wizkids licensed the rights to rulebooks and other gaming materials to Fantasy Productions, better known as "FanPro" in the United States, which had produced and distributed the German language versions of those games for FASA. FanPro's support of the Shadowrun and Battletech game worlds resulted in continued demand for metal miniatures by gaming enthusiasts.

In March 2001 Ral Partha began producing collectible metal versions of the WizKids 64-figure Mage Knight Rebellion set. The relationship between Wizkids and Ral Partha was a short one. By year's end Wizkids rethought its investment in metal miniatures and divested itself of Ral Partha's manufacturing capabilities while retaining the Ral Partha trademark.

=== Iron Wind Metals, 2001–2014 ===
In late 2001 Ral Partha's manufacturing capacities were spun off from WizKids, and renamed Iron Wind Metals, LLC, with longtime general manager Michael Noe as president and in partnership with Marc Rubin, one of Ral Partha's original owners. Iron Wind Metals retained the same location and much of the same production staff, molds, equipment, working relationships with artists, and licensing agreements. In addition to their own lines, Iron Wind Metals carries out contract production work for other gaming labels such as Tom Meier's Thunderbolt Mountain, Dark Sword Miniatures, Crocodile Games, and dozens of others.

Iron Wind Metals' new focus on productive capacities reflected a shift in game production strategy. The previous model had been that gaming companies hired sculptors and other creative talent to feed their in-house casting and packaging facilities. This model was successful, but artists sometimes didn't have the capital necessary to retain copyrights, and the mercurial nature of the market meant that their game designs could be sold to others, or languish as assets of dead companies. In the late 1980s, many game designers and sculptors established boutique companies, often operating out of their own homes, and then contracted out or made partnerships with companies like Iron Wind Metals to do the production.

Iron Wind Metals continued to use the name Ral Partha to describe archived designs, but the website and Ral Partha trademark remained the property of Wizkids which underwent a series of acquisitions. In 2003 WizKids was purchased by Topps, a manufacturer of sports cards who were interested in WizKids range of similarly collectible plastic miniatures. In 2007 Topps was purchased by The Tornante Company, a private equity firm. Citing falling profits associated with the Great Recession, Tornante put the Wizkids product lines on hold in November 2008, but continued to lease the intellectual properties of Battletech and Shadowrun game worlds. In September 14, 2009, The Tornante Company sold the majority of the Wizkids assets to the National Entertainment Collectibles Association (NECA), but retained the rights to Battletech, Shadowrun, and the Ral Partha trademark and website.

The divisions and purchases meant that assets important to the Ral Partha brand were divided among numerous enterprises. Between 1998 and 2009, the Ral Partha trademark passed from FASA, to Wizkids, Topps, and finally The Tornante Company. None of whom utilized the brand. The miniatures for the Battletech miniatures produced by Ral Partha and then Iron Wind Metals remained popular, but the future of the game was always in question. FanPro had lost its bid to produce the Battletech and Shadowrun game worlds, but InMediaRes created a new subsidiary, Catalyst Game Labs to design new expansions for the games and provided continuity by employing many former FanPro staff The productive capacities for Ral Partha miniatures remained with Iron Wind Metals who had retained working relationships with many of the artists, but could not use the Ral Partha name. Longtime customers could special order many of the figures, but they could not be marketed as Ral Partha figures. The trademark languished until 2014 when The Tornante Company agreed to sell the assets to Iron Wind Metals. By the end of 2014 Iron Wind Metals had recreated Ral Partha by forming a new division which united the Ral Partha trademark, website and sculptors' copyrights with their improved productive capacities.

=== Ral Partha, a Division of Iron Wind Metals, 2014–2020 ===
On the 40th anniversary of the founding of Ral Partha, Iron Wind Metals relaunched the miniature lines from Ral Partha's "golden age." Establishing Ral Partha as a division of Iron Wind Metals, president Mike Noe and co-owner Mark Rubin launched a Kickstarter campaign to crowdfund the production costs of its 1980s lines under the Chaos Wars game world. Ral Partha had begun developing Chaos Wars in 1986. At that time they had released a new version of 'house rules" called Rules According to Ral gaming system with scenarios, several boxed sets, and blister packs marked with Chaos Wars stickers. However, the initiative was put on hold by the push to produce miniatures for lines licensed by TSR, FASA, and other partners. After a sixteen-year hiatus, Chaos Wars returned as a series of blister packs, limited edition boxed sets, and battle packs of elves, orcs and goblin figures drawn from Ral Partha's CS/02-xxx Fantasy Collectors, 12-xxx The All American and other lines. A majority of the figures were sculpted by Tom Meier who supported the re-release. In 2016 Iron Wind Metals completed a second campaign and revived previously archived figures of dwarves, undead and troglodytes

=== Ral Partha Legacy LTD., since 2020 ===
In July 2020, Iron Wind Metals retired the "Ral Partha - A Division of Iron Wind Metals" brand and licensed the Ral Partha era fantasy and historical miniatures to "Ral Partha Legacy Ltd." which owns the Chaos Wars games. Ral Partha Legacy also acquired the license to Tom Meier's Thunderbolt Mountain Miniature lines which unites more than four decades of the artist's work. The new company has announced additions to the existing lines by original designers like Tom Meier and Robert N. Charrette, as well as new artists. Iron Wind Metals continues to produce lines for the FASA era, futuristic games including Battletech and Shadowrun.

== Sculptors, artists and mold-makers ==
Ral Partha's sculptors, artists, and mold-makers and the years in which they worked for the company:

Staff Sculptors

- Tom Meier, 1975–1988, Freelance 1989-1991, since 2015
- Dennis Mize, 1979–1999
- Julie Guthrie, 1983–1992
- Bob Charrette, 1984–1988
- Chris Atkin, 1985–1999
- Richard Kerr, 1987–1994
- Sandra Garrity, 1988–1992
- Dave Summers, 1988–1996
- Bob Olley, 1990–1999
- Jeff Wilhelm, 1991–2000
- Jim Johnson, 1992–1996
- Steve Saunders, 1994–2001
- Robert Kyde, 1995–1996
- Chris FitzPatrick, 1995–2001
- Geoff Valley, 1995–2001
- Brady Bugge, 1997–2001
- Jeff Grace, 1997–2001
- Ken Kersey, 1997–2001
- Bobby Jackson, 1999–2001
- John Winter, 1999–2001
- Tim Prow, 2000–2001
- James Van Schaik, 2000–2001
- Phil Lewis
- Behrle W. Hubboch III

Freelance Sculptors

- George Freeman, 1977–1978
- Ann Gallup, 1977
- William Murray, 1977–1978
- Jay Adams, 1979
- Brian Apple, 1979
- Chub Pearson, 1987
- Nicholas Bibby, 1990
- John M. Garrity, 1991
- Walter B. Vail, 1991
- Juan Montaño, since 2022

Mold-Makers, Casters and Production Managers

- Michael Murphy, mold-maker, production manager 1977–1986
- Gary Wilkerson, master mold-maker 1977–1984
- Michael Noe, mold-maker 1982–1986, production manager 1987–2001, president 2001-present
- C. Brad Gorby, illustrator, sculptor, mold-warrior 1984–1985
- Brian Hitsman, master mold-maker 1984–1991
- John Sarver, master mold-maker 1992–2001

Graphic Artists and Illustrators

- William Neff, illustrator 1986–1987
- Keith Holmes, illustrator 1986
- Douglas Mize, illustrator 1987
- Thomas O. Miller, creative director, 1988–1994
- Michael Weaver, art director, illustrator 1987–1990
- Brian Librandi, catalog layout 1995–1997
- J.A. Decambra, catalog layout 1995–1997
- Joseph Kyde, orthographic design, Battletech 1995–2001

== Awards ==
Origins Awards / H.G. Wells Awards

- 1977 – Best Fantasy Figure Series (ES/01-xxx Fantasy Line Tom Meier)
- 1978 – Best Historical Figure Series (11/42-xxx 1200 A.D. Tom Meier)
- 1978 – Best Fantasy or Science Fiction Figure Series – Fantasy Collectors Series (CS/02-xxx Tom Meier)
- 1979 – Best Fantasy or Science Fiction Figure Series – Collectibles (CS/02-xxx Tom Meier)
- 1980 – Best Historical Figure Series – Condottieri (15/54-xxx Tom Meier)
- 1980 – Best Fantasy or Science Fiction Figure Series – Personalities (ES/01-xxx Tom Meier)
- 1981 – Best Historical Figure Series – Condottieri (15/54-xxx Tom Meier)
- 1982 – Best Fantasy or Science Fiction Figure Series – Personalities & Things That Go Bump In The Night (ES/01-xxx Tom Meier)
- 1983 – Best Vehicular Series – 25mm Dwarf Steam Cannon (02-030 Tom Meier)
- 1984 – Best Historical Figure Series – 25mm Colonials (88-xxx Zulus and Northwest Frontier, Tom Meier)
- 1984 – Best Fantasy or Science Fiction Figure Series – 25mm Personalities (ES/01-xxx Tom Meier)
- 1985 – Best Historical Figure Series – 25mm Samurai (53-7xx Bob Charrette, Dennis Mize)
- 1986 – Best Vehicular or Accessory Series – BattleTech Mech. (20-8xx Bob Charrette, Julie Guthrie, Tom Meier)
- 1987 – Best Historical Figure Series – Shogun Hardguys: The New Samurai (53-7xx Dennis Mize, Bob Charrette)
- 1988 – Best Historical Figure Series – 1200 A.D., Aztecs (42-3xx Richard Kerr)
- 1988 – Best Fantasy or Science Fiction Figure Series – TSR's AD&D Series (11-xxx Tom Meier, Dennis Mize)
- 1988 – Best Vehicular or Accessory Series – BattleTech Mechs (20-8xx Bob Charrette, Julie Guthrie, Tom Meier)
- 1989 – Best Fantasy or Science Fiction Figure Series – Dragonlance Heroes Line (10–502 Dennis Mize, Tom Meier, Richard Kerr)
- 1989 – Best Vehicular Miniatures Series – BattleTech Mechs and Vehicles (20-xxx Dave Summers, Sandy Garrity, Richard Kerr, Tom Meier, Bob Charrette, Julie Guthrie)
- 1990 – Best Historical Figure Series – 25mm Ancients (35-7xx North African Ancients Dave Summers, Sandra Garrity)
- 1990 – Best Fantasy or Science Fiction Figure Series – AD&D Monsters (11-4xx Dennis Mize, Nick Bibby, Richard Kerr, Sandra Garrity)
- 1991 – Best Fantasy or Science Fiction Figure Series – Shadowrun (20-5xx Tom Meier, Dennis Mize, Dave Summers)
- 1991 – Best Vehicular Miniatures Series – BattleTech Mechs & Vehicles (20-xxx Jeff Wilhelm, Dave Summers, Sandy Garrity, Richard Kerr, Tom Meier, Bob Charrette, Julie Guthrie)
- 1992 – Best Fantasy or Science Fiction Figure Series – Ravenloft (11-1xx Dennis Mize)
- 1992 – Best Vehicular Miniatures Series – BattleTech Mechs & Vehicles (20-8xx Jeff Wilhelm, Dave Summers, Sandy Garrity, Richard Kerr, Tom Meier, Bob Charrette, Julie Guthrie)
- 1992 – Best Vehicular Miniatures Series – Ogre Miniatures (Jeff Wilhelm, Dave Summers, Richard Kerr)
- 1992 – Best Historical Figure Series – Hyksos Ancient Biblical (Jim Johnson)
- 1993 – Best Fantasy or Science Fiction Figure Series – AD&D line (11-xxx Dennis Mize, Jim Johnson, Geoffrey Valley, Dave Summers, Jeff Wilhelm, Richard Kerr)
- 1993 – Best Vehicular Series – BattleTech (20-8xx Dave Summers, Jim Johnson, Richard Kerr, Jeff Wilhelm)
- 1994 – Best Fantasy or Science Fiction Figure Series – AD&D Personalities (11-xxx Jim Johnson, Dennis Mize, Jeff Wilhelm)
- 1994 – Best Vehicular Series – BattleTech: Vehicles & 'Mechs (20-xxx Chris Atkin, Jim Johnson, Richard Kerr, Dave Summers, Jeff Wilhelm)
- 1995 – Best Vehicular Series – BattleTech: Vehicles & 'Mechs (20-xxx Chris Atkin, Robert Kyde, Jim Johnson, Dave Summers, Jeff Wilhelm)
- 1996 – Best Vehicular Miniatures Series – BattleTech: Mechs & Vehicles (20-xxx Chuck Crain, Chris Atkin, Jim Johnson, Robert Kyde, Dave Summers, Jeff Wilhelm)

Origins Hall of Fame

- 1991 – Tom Meier
- 1995 – Julie Guthrie
- 1997 – Ral Partha BattleTech Mechs & Vehicles (Chuck Crain, Developer)
- 2003 – Bob Charrette
- 2005 – Dennis Mize

Strategist Club "Creativity in Wargaming" Award

- 1978 – Outstanding Miniature Figure Line – Fantasy Collectors Series (CS/02-xxx, Tom Meier)
- 1979 – Outstanding Miniatures Figure Line – Condottieri (15/54-xxx Tom Meier)

The Courier Award

- 1979 – Best Historical Miniature Line – Condottieri (15/54-xxx Tom Meier)

Games Day Awards

- 1979 – Best Range SF/F Figures – Personalities and Things that Go Bump in the Night (ES/01-xxx Tom Meier)
- 1980 – Best Figures Range, Historical – 1200 A.D. (11-xxx Tom Meier)

== References in popular culture ==
The company was honored by the writers of the television show Andromeda by the naming of a fictional planet "Ral Parthea," a planet-wide nature preserve created by an ancient race of space aliens. The miniature company's name has been adopted by the San Francisco "Scandinavian Preppy" band Ral Partha Vogelbacher. Reportedly the last part of the band's name was the surname of a childhood bully of one of the members, and forms a statement of the nerd pride movement.
