= Terror Australis: Call of Cthulhu in the Land Down Under =

Horror tabletop role-playing game adventure

Terror Australis
Call of Cthulhu in the Land Down
- 1st edition cover by Tom Sullivan.
- Designers: Penelope Love; Mark Morrison; Lynn Willis; Larry DiTillio; Sandy Petersen
- Publishers: Chaosium
- Publication: 1987 1st edition softback; 2004 1st edition PDF; 2019 2nd edition hardcover, softback, PDF
- Genres: Horror
- Systems: Basic Role-Playing
- ISBN: 978-1568824154

Terror Australis is a supplement published by Chaosium in 1987 for the horror role-playing game Call of Cthulhu, itself based on the works of H. P. Lovecraft. It was written by Penelope Love, Mark Morrison, Lynn Willis, Larry DiTillio, and Sandy Petersen, and is intended to be used as a sourcebook for adventures in Australia in the 1920s. It received positive reviews in game periodicals including White Dwarf, Casus Belli, and Dragon. A revised and expanded second edition was published in 2019, which won two ENnie Awards.

== Description ==
Terror Australis is a sourcebook for life in Australia in the 1920s. The book details geographical information, lifestyles of the time, transportation around the continent, aboriginal culture and myths, and a timeline of Australia.

In the first edition, three adventures are included:

- "Pride of Yirrimburra"
- "Old Fellow That Bunyip"
- "City Beneath the Sands" (written by Lynn Willis and Larry DiTillio, and originally planned for inclusion in 1984's Masks of Nyarlathotep)

In the second edition, two adventures are included:

- "Long Way from Home"
- "Black Water, White Death"

== Publication history ==
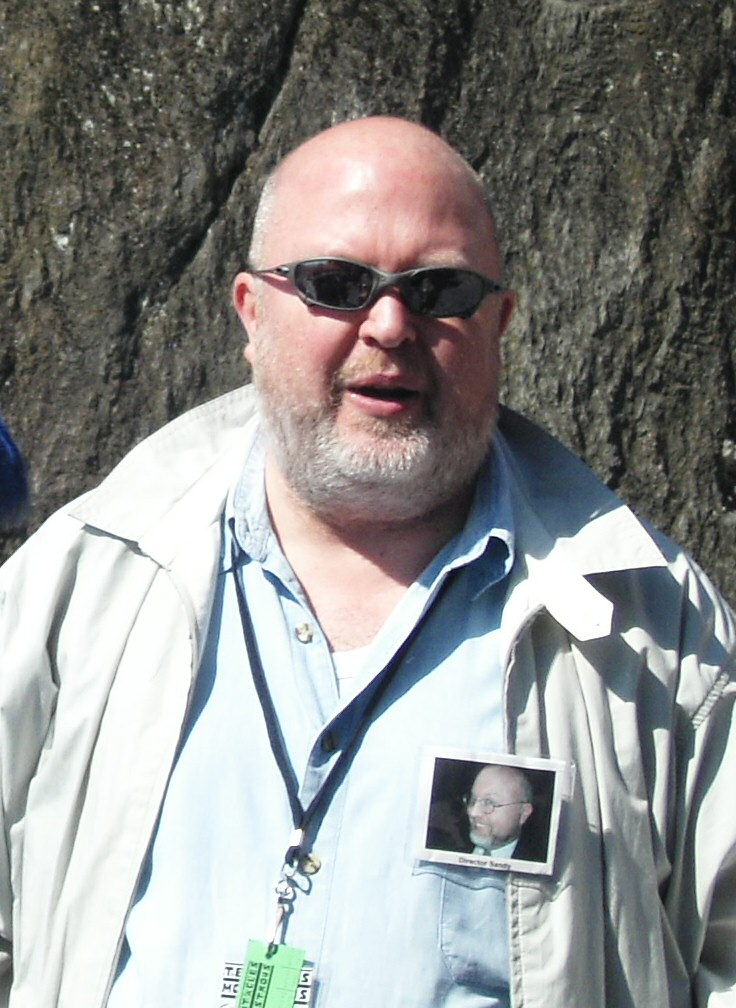
The book's designers included Sandy Petersen (pictured in 2004).

Chaosium published the horror role-playing game Call of Cthulhu in 1981, followed by several supplements and adventures, including Terror Australis: Call of Cthulhu in the Land Down Under (1987), a 136-page softcover book written by Penelope Love, Mark Morrison, Lynn Willis, Larry DiTillio, and Sandy Petersen, with interior cartography and art by Ron Leming, two full-color maps by Philip and Marion Andersen, and cover art by Tom Sullivan.

A revised and expanded second edition was published in 2019 for the 7th edition Call of Cthulhu and Pulp Cthulhu, a 304-page PDF written by Penelope Love, Mark Morrison, Dean Engelhardt, Marion Anderson, Phil Anderson, Geoff Gillan, Richard Watts, Darren Watson, Vian Lawson, John Hughes, Tristan Goss, James Haughton, Sandy Petersen, Brian M. Sammons, with contributions by Mike Mason and Lynne Hardy, cartography by Matt Ryan, Kalin Kadiev, Andrew Law, and Nicholas Nacario, interior art by Corey Brickley, Caleb Cleveland, David Grilla, Eric Lofgren, Joel Chaim Holtzman, Jonathan Wyke, Lee Simpson, Linda Jones, Matthew Wright, Michelle Lockamy, Pat Laboyko, Victor Leza, and M. Wayne Miller, and cover art by Miller.

2nd edition cover by M. Wayne Miller, 2019

== Reception ==
Both the 1st and 2nd editions received good reviews from critics:

- In the June 1987 edition of White Dwarf (Issue #90), Jim Bambra was generally positive about the first edition of Terror Australis, stating that "Terror Australis is a real beaut of a product an' that. Ideal for perusing beside a billybong as your billy boils or while having a spell in the local giggle house. This bonzer book will keep ya players as busy as a one-armed bill poster in a high wind and enjoying every minute of it. Fair Dinkum."
- In the June–July 1987 edition of Casus Belli (Issue #39), Frédéric Blayo found the information contained in the 1st edition to be "indispensable", and concluded with a strong recommendation, saying, "In short, a very good supplement, opening up a new continent in detail, and ensuring hours of anguish for the most experienced investigators. Good luck!"
- In the August 1987 edition of Dragon (Issue #124), Ken Rolston was impressed by the 1st edition, commenting, "Literate, macabre doom shambles from each page. Good reading, and a good campaign setting for COC adventures."
- Paul StJohn Mackintosh, reviewing the second edition of Terror Australis for RPGNet, rated the book 5/5 for Style and 5/5 Substance and said it is a "superbly produced update of one of the more original and fascinating settings for Call of Cthulhu, brought up to speed with the latest edition rules, with added cultural sensitivity, historical depth, and sheer atmosphere".

== Awards ==
- At the 2019 ENnie Awards, the 2nd edition was awarded Gold for "Best Cover of 2019", and Silver for "Best Setting of 2019".

== Other recognition ==
In 2020, the National Library of Australia added a copy of the second edition to their collection as a work "of national significance relating to Australia and the Australian people".
