= The Complete Masks of Nyarlathotep =

Tabletop horror role-playing game campaign

- Third edition cover by Lee Gibbons.
- Designers: Larry DiTillio; Lynn Willis
- Publishers: Chaosium
- Publication: 1984 1st Edition, Masks of Nyarlathotep, boxed set; 1989 2nd edition, Masks of Nyarlathotep, softcover; 1996 3rd edition, The Complete Masks of Nyarlathotep, softcover; 2001 3rd edition, The Complete Masks of Nyarlathotep, reset and revised, softcover; 2006 3rd edition, The Complete Masks of Nyarlathotep, reset and revised, hardcover; 2010 4th edition, Masks of Nyarlathotep, hard & softcover; 2018 5th edition, Masks of Nyarlathotep, Three volume slipcase set.
- Genres: Horror
- Systems: Basic Role-Playing

The Complete Masks of Nyarlathotep is an adventure campaign published by Chaosium in 1996 for the horror role-playing game Call of Cthulhu; it is the third edition of the adventure campaign Masks of Nyarlathotep originally published in 1984. It is a series of several sequential adventures set in the 1920s that take the player characters from New York, to London, Cairo, Nairobi, and Shanghai as they deal with the threat of the god Nyarlathotep. The Complete Masks of Nyarlathotep is a revised and expanded version of the original adventure scenario with additional material by new authors. It won an Origins Award and received positive reviews in game periodicals including Arcane and Dragon.

== Publication history ==
In 1984, Chaosium published the boxed set, Masks of Nyarlathotep, as the first adventure campaign for the Call of Cthulhu role-playing game.

In 1996, Chaosium released The Complete Masks of Nyarlathotep, a revised version for the fifth edition of Call of Cthulhu. The original, written by Larry DiTillio and Lynn Willis, had been 160 pages, with 44 separate player handouts (newspaper clippings, handwritten letters, business cards and a matchbox). The new edition was expanded to 224 pages and had additional material provided by Geof Gillan, Kevin A. Ross, Thomas W. Phinney, Michael MacDonald, Sandy Petersen, and Penelope Love, with artwork by Lee Gibbons, Nick Smith, Tom Sullivan, and Jason Eckhardt. However, the 44 handouts that had been separate pieces in the previous edition were incorporated into the book in this edition. Referees wishing to use them have to photocopy the materials.

== Contents ==
The book covers a campaign of sequential adventures that span the globe from New York, London, Cairo, and Kenya, to Shanghai, and pits the investigators against a world-wide cult that is attempting to complete a ritual that will call Nyarlathotep, the Crawling Chaos and Outer God, to destroy the world. The Investigators must surmount a series of deadly encounters in order to save the world.

This adventure is considered by some to be one of the best roleplaying campaigns of all time.

== Reception ==
In the March 1997 edition of Arcane (Issue 17), Steve Faragher warned prospective referees to "Be prepared for quite a bit of work as you try to get your head around 200 pages of densely packed information. There are 45 clue handouts and the place of each in the overall jigsaw must be fully understood by the referee before granting the information to the players. There are nearly 100 major non-player characters whose motives must be fully understood. And there are about 25 mini-scenarios, each of which interlinks crucially with all the others. In trying to read and understand all of this information, you'll find yourself with the feeling that your head will burst open from the information overload." However, he lauded the campaign for its "sublime pacing", and complimented it for its non-linear storyline and superior organization. He concluded by giving the book a top score of 10 out of 10, saying, "This remains one of roleplaying's finest moments, the standard by which all other campaigns should be judged. Its intricacy and open-endedness ... make it a shining example of the dizzy heights to which roleplaying can and should aspire... If ever there was a campaign - for any roleplaying system - that could be described as a work of art, this is it. It's a piece of sustained imagination that is the equal of many classics of literature and cinema."

In the October 1997 edition of Dragon (Issue #240), Rick Swan called this campaign "a marvel... a work of staggering power, expertly crafted and unforgettable." He concluded by giving it a top rating of 6 out of 6, saying, "Absorbing, disturbing and astonishingly adept, Masks of Nyarlathotep is the definition of a role-playing masterpiece."

In the July 1998 edition of Dragon (Issue #249), Ray Winninger complimented the campaign on its clarity of direction, saying, "Masks was designed in an era in which published adventures were expected to provide clear and specific instructions for running each encounter. Whereas most modern adventures and campaigns present no more than a general blueprint for the game master to follow, Masks rarely misses an opportunity to expound upon each and every one of the options open to the players at any given moment, providing specific advice on how the Keeper might react to all of them." However, Winninger did warn prospective players that "Full enjoyment of the campaign requires an unusually ambitious commitment in both time and intensity from the Keeper and players alike." He also noted the lethality of the campaign, saying, "Players are expected to lose a handful of Investigators along the way." But he concluded with a strong recommendation: "Buy this book — even if you don’t think you can keep a group of players together long enough to finish the campaign, even if you’re not particularly interested in Call of Cthulhu. Merely as an example of good, crisp campaign design, it’s more than worth its comparatively meager price tag. Those of you who actually play Masks are likely to have some of your most memorable game sessions in store for you."

== Reviews ==
- Backstab #8

== Awards ==
The Complete Masks of Nyarlathotep won the Origins Award for Best Role-Playing Adventure of 1996.

== See also ==
- The Dreaming Stone
- Horror on the Orient Express
- In the Shadows
