= List of He-Man and the Masters of the Universe (2002 TV series) episodes =

He-Man and the Masters of the Universe (Note: Later referred to as Masters of the Universe vs. The Snake Men during its second season.) is an animated television series. Developed for television by Michael Halperin, who created the original series, it was animated by Mike Young Productions. It served as an update of the 1980s Filmation series, produced to coincide with Mattel's revival of the Masters of the Universe franchise eleven years after its previous attempt. The series premiered episodes on Cartoon Network's Toonami and SVES programming blocks between August 16, 2002, and January 10, 2004, with reruns airing until March 6, 2004.

== Series overview ==
Season	Episodes	Originally released	
Season	Episodes	First released	Last released
1	26	August 16, 2002	October 11, 2003
2	13	October 18, 2003	January 10, 2004

== Episodes ==
The following is a list of episodes of the television series.

=== Season 1 (2002–03) ===
No. overall	No. in season	Title	Directed by	Written by	Original release date
1 2 3	1 2 3	"The Beginning"	Gary Hartle	Dean Stefan	August 16, 2002
In the past, Eternia is attacked by the sorcerer Keldor and his Evil Warriors, battling against Captain Randor and the Masters of the Universe. The Elders of Eternia, aware of this attack, seal away their magical power into an orb and prophecise that a hero will rise to defend Eternia from evil in the future, before Randor defeats Keldor by deflecting a vial of acid poison into his face. Years later, King Randor and Queen Marlena celebrate the 16th birthday of their son, the spoiled and irresponsible Prince Adam. During the party, Adam is taken by Man-At-Arms to see The Sorceress of Castle Grayskull, who explains to him that the Elders hid their power within Castle Grayskull, and the destiny of He-Man to defend Eternia from evil. Adam humbly remarks that they have made a good selection for He-Man: Man-at-Arms. When the Sorceress explains that Adam was chosen, however, he blows her off and heads back to the palace. At the same time, Keldor and his Evil Warriors succeed in disrupting the Mystic Wall that has imprisoned them on the Dark Hemisphere of Eternia, learning of the Elder's disappearance and launching an attack on the palace soon after. Adam attempts to join the fight, but after witnessing Keldor—now disfigured and referring to himself as Skeletor—kidnap King Randor, he flees back to Castle Grayskull, followed by his pet tiger Cringer and Orko, the royal magician. Using the Sword of Power, Adam transforms himself into He-Man, and then transforms Cringer into Battle Cat, being advised by the Sorceress to never reveal his identity. With his newfound power, He-Man helps the Masters fend off the Evil Warriors before saving his father from Skeletor. At the palace, Adam concedes with the Sorceress' warning not to reveal his identity; while, on Snake Mountain, Skeletor begins to plot to destroy He-Man in order to secure rule of Eternia for himself.
4	4	"The Courage of Adam"	Gary Hartle	Dean Stefan	September 20, 2002
From their battle in the previous episode, Skeletor deduces that He-Man has something to do with the Elder's power and that his sentimentality is his greatest weakness, plotting to exploit this by kidnapping Prince Adam to lure the hero into a trap. Meanwhile, Adam is troubled by Teela, Man-At-Arms' adopted daughter and his childhood friend, viewing him as a coward for abandoning the battle against the Evil Warriors. In order to prove himself, he decides to join Stratos on a diplomatic mission to Andreenos, which is observed by Skeletor. Using Adam's brashness to his advantage, Skeletor successfully sends his henchmen to kidnap him, demanding He-Man in exchange. Man-At-Arms sends a training robot disguised as He-Man to distract the Evil Warriors while Orko and Cringer deliver his sword, although they are unable to, leading to Man-At-Arms, Teela and Ram-Man having to rescue Adam themselves. Adam still attempts to prove himself by fighting the Evil Warriors, but is finally forced to transform himself and Cringer into He-Man and Battle Cat when Skeletor defeats the Masters using his new weapon—a gigantic skeleton creature. At the palace, Man-At-Arms explains to Adam that, despite his courage, He-Man will always be needed. Moral: Along with one of the training robots, Man-At-Arms tells the audience that people are not always what they seem, and possess strength and abilities hidden to the naked eye.
5	5	"Sky War"	Gary Hartle	Michael Reaves	September 27, 2002
King Randor hosts the diplomatic meeting between the Bird People of Avion and the Bee People on Andreenos, alluded to in the previous episode. The Andreenids' representative, Buzz-Off, refuses the prospect of an alliance against Skeletor, despite King Randor and Stratos' insistence. Meanwhile, having learned about the meeting, Skeletor plots to ignite war between the two races in order to steal ambrosia; the Adreenids' mystical super-food, which will allow him greater power. Following a series of staged attacks against both nations, He-Man and Battle Cat, along with Teela, head off to investigate, fighting off Skeletor's minions sent to intercept them along the way. After Tri-Klops hijacks a peaceful message sent by King Randor to both nations, Stratos and Buzz-Off ready their people for war, just as He-Man and Teela arrive. Having stolen and empowered himself with the ambrosia, Skeletor and his minions beat down He-Man, until they are forced to retreat as the ambrosia holds toxic side-effects for all but the Andreenids. He-Man is able to inform the opposing sides of Skeletor's manipulations, allowing them to end things peacefully. In the face of this event, Buzz-Off chooses to ally with King Randor against Skeletor's evil, joining the Masters as a new member. Moral: Stratos informs the audience of the importance in being a team player.
6	6	"The Deep End"	Gary Hartle	Brooks Wachtel	October 4, 2002
Man-At-Arms detects an energy surge originating within the Sea of Rakash, and heads there with Adam, Teela and Orko to investigate. Evil-Lyn alerts Skeletor to the presence of the Coradite crystal previously used to help destroy the Mystic Wall, which he decides to use in another scheme, only to realize it has been stolen by Mer-Man. Soon, Man-At-Arms discovers Mer-Man plotting to use the Coradite to rule the seas, and battles him and the other Evil Warriors over it. In the chaos, one of Mer-Man's sea beasts swallows both the Coradite and Man-At-Arms, mutating into a much larger form. The beast attacks a nearby village, and is fought by He-Man and the Masters. Driving the beast outside the village, He-Man enters its mouth in order to help free Man-At-Arms and recover the Coradite. The beast mutates further and begins to rampage towards Castle Grayskull, and He-Man frees himself and Man-At-Arms before Teela and the Masters are forced to destroy it. He-Man sends the beast down a cliff before preventing the Coradite from exploding by absorbing its energies through his sword. Afterwards, Skeletor declares that he has gained valuable knowledge from this event, wondering what is in Castle Grayskull that makes it worth dying for. Moral: He-Man and Orko tell the viewer that true friends stick together through thick and thin.
7	7	"Lessons"	Gary Hartle	Larry DiTillio	October 11, 2002
Orko's magic causes disaster during reconstruction at the Royal Palace. As a result, he travels to Castle Grayskull to meet the Sorceress, and asks her to return him home to Trolla using her magic, believing that nobody has any use for him on Eternia. The Sorceress agrees, but, disguised as another visitor of the Castle, she shows him moments from his past—including saving Prince Adam when he was a boy, and entertaining the king and queen—to prove that he is needed. Meanwhile, Skeletor, still suspicious of Grayskull, devises a plan to break into it by using the Ram Stone. Although uneased by the mission, Evil-Lyn heads out to the ruins of Zalesia with Trap Jaw and Beast Man to acquire the stone, successfully taking it after a fight with its guardian, the Faceless One. Skeletor uses the stone to break down Grayskull's defenses, although Orko uses his tricks to distract him, additionally dropping the Ram Stone into the abyss, until He-Man is able to fight the villains back. Back in Zalesia, the Faceless One finds the Ram Stone, recovered by Evil-Lyn, along with a note from her saying that Skeletor will never bother him again. Touched, the Faceless One declares that there is hope for his daughter after all. Moral: Orko tells the audience that everyone can make mistakes, but true friends will appreciate you for what you are.
8	8	"Siren's Song"	Gary Hartle	William Forrest Cluverius	October 18, 2002
Man-At-Arms tells the other Masters the truth about Grayskull and the magic it holds following another fight with Skeletor's forces. In order to disrupt their enemies, Evil-Lyn plots to brainwash one of the Masters and force them to betray the others, choosing Ram-Man due to his unwavering loyalty. Evil-Lyn enchants Ram-Man while disguised as a beautiful siren, making him obedient every time he hears her song. Using Ram-Man, the Evil Warriors steal Man-At-Arms' latest device, the Kinetic Immobilizer, but while delivering it, he is witnessed by Adam and Teela. Ram-Man is outed as the traitor despite him claiming to have no idea of what he was doing; and, using this to their advantage, Skeletor and Evil-Lyn have him break out of prison to lure the Masters into a trap. Skeletor attempts to freeze the Masters using the Kinetic Immobilizer, only for Man-At-Arms to reveal that Ram-Man's arrest was staged and that they are aware of his brainwashing, stating that his device requires an activation code. The Evil Warriors are then frozen in place by the Kinetic Immobilizer, only for Evil-Lyn to steal it back and freeze the Masters, plotting to take the power of Grayskull for herself. She attempts to dispose of He-Man using her siren form's hypnosis, but Ram-Man attacks her, freeing He-Man and destroying the Immobilizer, which releases everyone. Ram-Man is taken back by the Masters, and he apologizes to Buzz-Off for his rude behavior towards him. Moral: He-Man tells the audience not to draw conclusions or make accusations before the facts are in.
9	9	"The Ties That Bind"	Gary Hartle	Dean Stefan	October 25, 2002
During a fight with the Evil Warriors at Castle Grayskull, Teela is heavily injured, and receives an emergency blood transfusion from the Sorceress. As an unintended side-effect, she begins to develop telepathic powers, allowing her to read the thoughts of those around her. Realizing this, Man-At-Arms has Adam avoid Teela so that his identity isn't compromised, and also tries to tell his daughter more about her past, only to be interrupted by the Sorceress. Man-At-Arms confronts the Sorceress in Castle Grayskull, criticizing her refusal to tell Teela that she is her mother, and wondering if she even cares for her at all. Meanwhile, gaining awareness of Teela's powers through her magic, Evil Lyn plants a trap for her and the Masters using a fake telepathic message. Believing that Skeletor's forces will attack from the Sands of Time, Teela leads the Masters out to the desert, only to be ambushed by Beast Man's monsters. He-Man and Man-At-Arms help defeat the monsters, and, guided from another message from the Sorceress, Teela leads the Masters back to Castle Grayskull to defend it from Skeletor. After the battle, Teela tries to get answers from the Sorceress as her powers begin to fade, but is left unsure as to who she really is. Later, Man-At-Arms apologizes to the Sorceress, realizing that she really does love Teela, even if she cannot reveal their connection so soon. Moral: Man-At-Arms tells the audience that a parent's love for a child is the strongest love imaginable, and that the sacrifices they make for their children are difficult.
10	10	"Dragon's Brood"	Gary Hartle	Michael Edens & Mark Edward Edens	November 1, 2002
On their way to meet Chief Carnivus to gain his alliance, Adam and Teela encounter a dragon that has been trapped by a cave-in, which Adan decides to free before returning their mission. It is revealed that Beast Man had trapped the dragon after stealing its eggs, hoping to finally control dragons for Skeletor's army by starting with hatchlings, but had lost them on the way back to Snake Mountain. Orko finds the eggs and confuses them for balls, and they hatch during a juggling performance at the palace. Although Mat-At-Arms scares them away, he expresses concern at how fast dragons can grow; and the next day, the dragons have become larger and begin looting shiny objects, leading to a fight with the Masters. Evil Lyn uses an illusion to draw the creatures towards Grayskull instead, intending for them to destroy it. Returning from their mission, Adam is contacted by the Sorceress and manages to turn into He-Man to fight the dragons at Grayskull with Teela. Once the dragons' mother arrives and begins to overwhelm the two heroes, He-Man recognizes her as the dragon from the cave, and she in turn recognizes He-Man as the one who freed her, thus abandoning the fight and flying off with her children. Skeletor's Evil Warriors arrive with a deadly Serpintaur under Beast Man's control and battle against the Masters, only to be defeated by the returning dragon mother and her children, who kill the Serpintaur and force Skeletor to retreat. Afterwards, Teela grows suspicious about why the dragon spared He-Man when Adam was the one to save her, but Man-At-Arms enforces that kindness inspires kindness. Moral: He-Man and Orko inform the audience about the value of kindness.
11	11	"Turnabout"	Gary Hartle	Len Uhley	November 15, 2002
The Masters prevent Skeletor from stealing the Diamond Ray of Disappearance from the Ice Mountains, but are unable to stop him from getting away, leaving them behind. To keep Skeletor at bay permanently, Man-At-Arms, with help from the Sorceress, constructs a belt to punish him for any evil thoughts or actions. The belt is soon attached to Skeletor after Adam and Teela lure him out, leaving him powerless and forced to pretend to be nice in order to get around its power. To counter this, Tri-Klops develops a harness to punish He-Man's goodness, and they lure him out with an attack upon Felis Qadi. He-Man suffers from the harness, but ultimately overpowers it with his strength, causing an explosion that scatters the Evil Warriors and destroys the belt. Skeletor begs for He-Man to help as he hangs from the edge of a cliff, which he does, although Skeletor attacks him and escapes. At the Palace, Adam wonders if he made the right decision by helping Skeletor, though Man-At-Arms assures him he could do nothing else, while Skeletor begins torturing his minions for their mocking remarks against him. Moral: He-Man tells the viewer that no force is more powerful than goodness, and that practicing kindness will make them feel good as well.
12	12	"Mekaneck's Lament"	Gary Hartle	Erik & Lara Runnels	November 22, 2002
Mekaneck begins to feel inferior to the other Masters due to his abilities, despite Adam's attempts to encourage him. An old man approaches Mekaneck and claims to grant wishes, offering to give him new abilities in exchange for an amulet hidden away in the Sands of Fire. The Sorceress summons Adam and warns him about the return of Count Marzo—a sorcerer who nearly conquered Etheria using his magic amulet, but was stopped by the army of Adam's grandfather, King Miro, and the Elders of Eternia, who transformed him into an old man and banished him to the Dark Hemisphere. Mekaneck successfully recovers the amulet and returns it to Marzo, who retreats and uses it to recover his true form. With two transformed rat creatures, Marzo rampages towards the Royal Palace for revenge, defeating He-Man and the Masters with his magic, and unleashing a poisonous cloud of gas to render everyone unconscious. Informed of the chaos by Orko, Mekaneck joins the battle and uses his neck-stretching abilities to avoid the gas and snatch the amulet from Marzo, allowing He-Man to throw it into the horizon, stopping Marzo's plans. At the palace, Mekaneck realizes that Adam was right about him all along; while, in the ocean, Marzo's amulet is shown to still be active. Moral: He-Man tells the audience that everyone has unique talents and abilities, and rather than try to be like others, they should be the best they can be.
13	13	"Night of the Shadowbeasts"	Gary Hartle	Michael Reaves	November 22, 2002
Beast Man introduces Skeletor to the Shadow Beasts; ravenous, powerful creatures that are only able to travel in absolute darkness. In order to use them, Skeletor has his minions block the vents to a large volcano in the Dark Hemisphere, causing it to constantly erupt and fill the sky with smoke. The Masters soon find themselves having to defend the Royal Palace from the Evil Warriors and the Shadow Beasts, while He-Man heads to Castle Grayskull to defend it from Skeletor. During the chaos, Ram-Man is forced to confront his secret fear of the dark, and ends up trapped underground with Teela during the battle—finally overcoming his fear by courageously defending her from the Shadow Beasts. He-Man battles the Beasts and Skeletor at Castle Grayskull, where a blast of light from the Sorceress dispatches the monsters, and He-Man rips open the volcano with his sword to stop the eruption permanently. Back on Snake Mountain, Skeletor leaves his minions in a room with the Shadow Beasts to punish them for their failure to destroy the Palace. Moral: Man-At-Arms informs the viewer that everyone has fears, and they can be a good thing.
14	14	"Underworld"	Gary Hartle	Steven Melching	December 13, 2002
In Subternia (Eternia's underground), He-Man and King Randor must prevent Skeletor from attacking Castle Grayskull from below. Moral: Prince Adam informs the viewers about leadership & how it isn't just telling people what to do but it's also about leading by example and standing up for what is right.
15	15	"The Mystery of Anwat Gar"	Gary Hartle	Kevin D. Campbell	December 20, 2002
He-Man and Man-At-Arms journey to a mysterious island to prevent Skeletor from getting his hands on powerful ancient stones. First appearance of Sy-Klone. Moral: He-Man informs the viewers that doing your duty is important but there's more to it than just following orders & the most important duty of all is to do what's right.
16	16	"The Monster Within"	Gary Hartle	Larry DiTillio	December 27, 2002
In a battle over the Emerald of Orkas Island, Beast Man realizes that he can use his powers to control Man-E-Faces in his monster form, and uses this against the Masters until the Evil Warriors are defeated. As a result, Man-E-Faces' confidence is shaken, and he becomes hesitant to resort to utilizing Man-E-Monster. To make up for his henchmen's failures, Skeletor resolves to hire professionals, and sends the rival bounty hunters Tuvar and Baddhra to defeat He-Man, much to the chagrin of his Evil Warriors. He-Man and Man-E-Faces are dispatched to the Tar Swamp to investigate claims of a monster, where they are then ambushed by Tuvar and Baddhra and their respective traps. He-Man is eventually captured by one of Baddhra's traps, and he and Tuvar begin fighting over who will claim the bounty for themselves. Man-E-Faces finds himself forced to resort to Man-E-Monster's brute strength to escape another trap, and attempts to free He-Man. The Evil Warriors arrive, defeating the bounty hunters to steal credit for He-Man's defeat. Beast Man uses his control over Man-E-Monster once again. However, Man-E-Faces succeeds in resisting Beast Man's control and bluffs him using his acting abilities, freeing He-Man and forcing the Evil Warriors into retreat. Back on Snake Mountain, the Evil Warriors shift all of the blame onto Tuvar and Baddhra, and, as punishment for their inability to co-operate, Skeletor uses his magic to fuse the bounty hunters together into the monstrous Two-Bad. Moral: Man-E-Faces tells the audience that feeling anger, jealousy, or the urge to say mean things is part of being human, and that we are still responsible for our own actions.
17	17	"Roboto's Gambit"	Gary Hartle	Michael Reaves	March 1, 2003
A simple chess-playing robot helps the Masters battle an evil army of bone creatures. First appearance of Roboto. Moral: Sy-Klone tells the audience that it's important to be flexible, in mind as well as body & that the common way of doing things isn't always the only way & a flexible mind is creative and open to new ideas.
18	18	"Trust"	Gary Hartle	William Forrest Cluverius	March 8, 2003
Stratos must form an uneasy alliance with Trap Jaw to survive the perilous Ice Mountains. Moral: Stratos tells the audience that we all want to be trusted. But to earn the trust of others, it's important to be trustworthy. And that means: keeping your word, being honest and of course: speaking the truth.
19	19	"Orko's Garden"	Gary Hartle	Len Uhley	March 15, 2003
Wanting more responsibility like the other Masters, Orko is assigned to tend to the Royal Gardens, but ends up causing more damage. Following Ram-Man's advice, Orko decides to find Moss Man; a being capable of growing out any kind of plant life, in order to fix the garden. He meets a creature in a dark cave who claims to be Moss Man, handing over a bag of seeds to him. Once Orko plants the seeds, they grow out and capture the Masters and the Royal Family, while also freeing "Moss Man" from the cave. The real Moss Man arrives to inspect the damage, informing Orko that the being he had met was Evil Seed, who represents an imbalance and destruction in nature and wants revenge on humanity for consuming plants. Moss Man and Orko are able to free Evil Seed's captives, and in the process, Orko mentions the power hidden in Castle Grayskull. Evil Seed decides to go to Grayskull instead, however, He-Man, Battle Cat and Moss Man are able to stop him. He-Man offers Moss Man a position with the Masters, which he happily accepts. Moral: Man-At-Arms and Orko tell the viewer that a job worth doing is a job worth doing well.
20	20	"Buzz-Off's Pride"	Gary Hartle	Christy Marx & Randall Littlejohn	March 22, 2003
With Andreenos' annual jubilee approaching, Buzz-Off, joined by Orko, travels to the village of Viridias to acquire some honeyberries for his queen. Upon arriving, he is confronted by the giant Azdar, who defeats him to prevent entry into the village, before being joined by two other giants, Belzar and Chadaz. Orko convinces Buzz-Off that he cannot defeat all three giants by himself, but upon returning to the palace, Buzz-Off keeps him from saying anything about the giants, as he does not want it to get out that he was defeated. Soon enough, word reached the palace about the giants terrorizing Viridias, and Buzz-Off joins Man-At-Arms, Ram-Man and Adam to investigate. Immediately, Buzz-Off begins pursuing Azdar out of vengeance rather than wait for a plan, allowing the giant to lead him away while his cohorts cause chaos in the village and battle the Masters. The giants manage to steal the Crystal of Prasinus that magically causes Viridias' crops to flourish—intending to extort Viridias and the surrounding villages it helps feed in exchange for giving it back—while Buzz-Off is lambasted by the other Masters for pursuing revenge rather than helping them or the villagers. Realizing the error he has made, Buzz-Off tracks the giants back to their home and swiftly steals the Crystal back without allowing his pride to cloud his judgement. Later, Buzz-Off presents his queen with some of the Honeyberries, assuring her it was no trouble to get them. Moral: While cleaning up Viridias still, He-Man tells the viewer to be honest, helpful, and fair.
21	21	"Snake Pit"	Gary Hartle	Steven Melching	March 29, 2003
The criminal Kobra Khan escapes from the Royal Palace dungeons and heads to Snake Mountain, where he successfully convinces Skeletor to allow him into his ranks. Man-At-Arms tells Adam, Teela and Orko that Khan intends to free the Snake Men and their leader, King Hiss, who were imprisoned underneath Snake Mountain in a timeless void by the Elders and the mystic warrior Zodac. To prevent this, Man-At-Arms and the others travel to the Mystic Mountains and recruit Zodac, who, wanting to avenge his brother's death at the hands of King Hiss, insists on stopping the Snake Men's return alone. Zodac finds his way to Snake Mountain and uses his ability to predict his opponents' moves to defeat the Evil Warriors; while, at the same time, Khan makes his way to the void. Khan successfully frees General Rattlor and other Snake Men, leading to a battle between them, Zodac and the Masters. Despite Skeletor's attempting to seal He-Man in the void—whereupon he also learns of Khan's true intentions—He-Man and Zodac are able to force the Snake Men back before King Hiss can fully emerge, although Khan and Rattlor get away. In the aftermath, Zodac thanks the Masters for their help, and promises to assist them in the future. Moral: He-Man informs the audience that there is no shame in asking for help.
22	22	"The Island"	Gary Hartle	Dean Stefan	April 5, 2003
On Orkas Island, Dekker, Man-At-Arms' mentor, converses with an old fisherman about how his former student is planning to visit him, which is overheard by two Karikoni. One of the Karikoni, Pinsore, decides to contact his cousin Clawful about the news, which motivates Skeletor to capture Man-At-Arms and force him to build new inventions for him. Man-At-Arms arrives on the island with Adam and Teela, discovering Dekker missing and ending up in a fight with several Karikoni. Man-At-Arms and Teela are captured alongside Dekker, although Adam escapes. Man-At-Arms and Dekker manage to fool their captors into freeing them, and with help from He-Man, battle the Karikoni. During the battle, Pinsore summons a group of venomous Pulmos, who poison Man-At-Arms. Remembering her father's teachings, Teela identifies the cure as the milk of a Madrona pod, which He-Man successfully retrieves. After the heroes have left the island, Skeletor and Clawful are left waiting for Pinsore to deliver Man-At-Arms. Moral: He-Man informs the viewer that practice is the key to success.
23	23	"The Sweet Smell of Victory"	Gary Hartle	Kevin D. Campbell	April 12, 2003
Odiphus, a low-level thief previously introduced in "Snake Pit", witnesses a battle between the Masters and the Evil Warriors and decides to join up with Skeletor's forces. After making it into Snake Mountain, he causes an accident with Tri-Klops' latest device—designed to remove Beast Man's stench—which mutates him to a much larger size, with the ability to produce an awful smell. Donning one of Tri-Klops' masks to protect himself, Odiphus tries to join the Evil Warriors with his newfound abilities, but is thrown out of Snake Mountain. However, Skeletor reconsiders once Odiphus accidentally sends a stampede of Unilope against the Royal Palace with his smell. Recruiting him, Skeletor directs Odiphus to attack the Palace with his stench, which quickly overcomes their defenses, with even He-Man unable to get close to him. Roboto, upset over his earlier failure against the Evil Warriors and being unable to identify Beast Man as the cause of the Unilope stampede, is snapped out of his depression by Man-At-Arms, and successfully advises He-Man to destroy Odiphus' mask, sending him fleeing before the Evil Warriors can invade. At Snake Mountain, Skeletor deems Odiphus useful to him, and he, donning new armor to control his scent, declares himself to be Stinkor. Moral: Man-At-Arms and Roboto inform the viewer that they should learn from their mistake rather than feeling defeated by them.
24	24	"Separation"	Gary Hartle	Larry DiTillio	April 19, 2003
Tuvar and Baddhra, still fused together as Two-Bad and desperate to be free of one another, follow Stinkor's advice and seek out a spell from the magic-dealer Vormus to return themselves to normal. They steal the "Spell of Separation" after he refuses to sell it, learning that they need to find three pieces in order to use it, which immediately alerts the Sorceress. She calls upon Adam and explains the history of the Triad—a superweapon that was once used by the dark warlord Hordak to split Etheria into the Light and Dark Hemispheres, yet he had to cancel the spell before it destroyed the entire planet, sending the pieces to the corners of Etheria so it could not be recovered. He-Man and Battle Cat are sent to stop Two-Bad from recovering the pieces, although they are able to grab the first piece from under the ocean, and the second piece from Subternia despite He-Man's warnings. They collect the final piece, and return to the Dark Hemisphere to assemble the Triad. Eternia begins to split apart once more, although He-Man, with help from the Sorceress and the dragon mother (from "Dragon's Brood"), manages to prevent the destruction by returning all the pieces to their original hiding places. Meanwhile, Sy-Klone, witnessing Man-At-Arms and Queen Marlena with their children, begins to feel lonely for his own family and travels Eternia with Roboto to find his remaining ancestors. In the end, while rebuilding from the destruction, Sy-Klone finds resolve in his mission, telling Roboto that the Masters are his family now. Moral: He-Man tells the viewers that it is easy to think of people that deeply care about us as family, and that someday the world could come to view itself as a big family as people come together.
25 26	25 26	"The Council of Evil"	Gary Hartle	Dean Stefan	October 4, 2003
25 26	25 26	"The Council of Evil"	Gary Hartle	Dean Stefan	October 11, 2003
Part 1: While on a mission for Skeletor, the Evil Warriors are defeated and captured by He-Man and the Masters. With this, King Randor declares the state of high alert to be over, allowing the Masters to take a leave. However, with the Masters now disassembled, Skeletor sends his new Council of Evil to capture his enemies and cause disturbances to lure the remaining ones out. Skeletor faces with Man-At-Arms personally at the Sands of Fire and defeats him, revealing that he planned for the Evil Warriors to be captured so the Masters would lower their defences all along. Concerned by the Masters not responding and informed of Stratos' capture by Orko, Adam leaves Teela to guard the Palace Dungeons while he "looks" for He-Man. Skeletor reconvenes with his Council of Evil on Snake Mountain—composed of Count Marzo, Webstor, Evil Seed, and the Giants Azdar, Belzar, and Chadaz—who ask about He-Man, who is sure to try and rescue the Masters. Skeletor announces that he is counting on it, as He-Man and Battle Cat ride towards Snake Mountain. Part 2: Skeletor observes He-Man as he approaches Snake Mountain, and sends the Council of Evil out to defeat him. The Council overcomes He-Man thanks to Marzo's magic and Evil Seed's plants, and continue to plot with Skeletor, unaware they are being watched by Kobra Khan. From their prison, Man-At-Arms and Roboto manage to contact Teela at the Palace, who arrives in the Dark Hemisphere just as He-Man transforms back to Prince Adam to escape his restraints. While infiltrating Snake Mountain, Adam tries to reveal his secret identity to Teela, only for Webstor to kidnap her, drop the Power Sword into an abyss, and leave him for dead. After Marzo steals the Ram Stone from the Faceless One, Skeletor and the Council head to Grayskull to steal its power, while Kobra Khan and Rattlor free the Evil Warriors from the palace dungeons. With the power of the Ram Stone and Marzo's amulet, Skeletor shatters Grayskull's defences, knocking out the Sorceress in the process. Cringer returns Adam to Grayskull in order to defend it as best they can. Surrounded by Skeletor and the Council, Adam notices approaching vehicles and declares that the Masters have arrived—only to realize that it is actually the Evil Warriors joining the fight, leaving him hopelessly outnumbered.

=== Season 2 (2003–04) ===
No. overall	No. in season	Title	Directed by	Written by	Original release date
27	1	"The Last Stand"	Gary Hartle	Dean Stefan	October 18, 2003
Continuing directly from the previous episode, Skeletor convinces his minions, sans Evil-Lyn, that he formed the Council of Evil to avenge their capture. Adam attempts to defend Grayskull from the villains, and is swept aside by Skeletor. Orko catches up with Adam and returns his Power Sword, allowing him to transform into He-Man once again. The Sorceress is rescued by Zodac, and together they repair Grayskull's magical barrier. He-Man destroys the Ram Stone before Skeletor can use it again, and battles the Council of Evil and the Evil Warriors until being overpowered by Marzo, Evil-Lyn and Skeletor's magic. The Masters then arrive--having been rescued by Moss Man, contacted by Zodac--and send the villains into retreat, with only Webstor remaining loyal to Skeletor. Man-At-Arms presents himself before Randor and attempts to step down from his position for allowing the Masters to let their guard down, but Queen Marlena convinces him to stay, inspiring Randor to create a new council to govern Eternia. Kobra Khan later approaches Evil-Lyn to collect on his debt for freeing her, although she refuses out of remaining loyalty to Skeletor. Using the magic of Snake Mountain, Khan reveals Skeletor's treachery in allowing the Evil Warriors to be captured, convincing Evil-Lyn to join him in freeing King Hiss. Moral: Queen Marlena tells the viewer that it is always possible to find creative ways to solve problems.
28	2	"To Walk with Dragons"	Gary Hartle	Dean Stefan	October 25, 2003
The Heroic Masters must thwart Skeletor's attacking serpinataurs by enlisting the help of vicious red dragons. Moral: He-Man tells the audience to never play with matches or get too close to an opened fire.
29	3	"Out of the Past"	Gary Hartle	Dean Stefan	November 1, 2003
Teela is drawn to a small village, where she gets further clues about her past. Moral: Man-At-Arms tells the viewers that everything in your mind is stored in your memory, like the books you read, so it's important to always be kind and helpful so you can always have fond memories to look back on.
30	4	"Rise of the Snake Men, Part 1"	Gary Hartle	Steve Melching	November 8, 2003
The Heroic Masters have to battle Skeletor's forces while trying to prevent the dreaded Snake Men from getting free from their ancient prison.
31	5	"Rise of the Snake Men, Part 2"	Gary Hartle	Steve Melching	November 15, 2003
Zodak joins forces with the Heroic Masters of the Universe to prevent the freed Snake Men from taking over Eternia. Moral: He-Man explains to the audience how teamwork and cooperation are the key elements of success.
32	6	"The Price of Deceit"	Gary Hartle	Larry DiTillio	November 22, 2003
Skeletor seeks to punish Evil-Lyn for betraying him. Moral: He-Man tells the viewer how it is important to forgive someone because it shows that you care about the person and it allows both of you to feel better.
33	7	"Of Machines and Men"	Gary Hartle	Michael Halperin	November 29, 2003
A mysterious force disables all technological power in Eternia, and Randor attempts to save Marlena. Moral: Man-At-Arms tells the viewer that there is nothing wrong with asking for help like from friends, family, or neighbors.
34	8	"Second Skin"	Gary Hartle	Steve Melching	December 6, 2003
It's up to the Masters of the Universe to stop King Hiss from using a devastatingly powerful ancient artifact which can transform other beings into Snake Men. Moral: Orko tells the audience you should always have a back up plan just in case something unexpected happens.
35	9	"The Power of Grayskull"	Gary Hartle	Dean Stefan	December 13, 2003
The Sorceress tells Prince Adam of the great history behind the power of Grayskull. At the same time, Skeletor is forced to release his old ally Hordak from his ancient prison. Moral: He Man tells the viewer about problem solving through peace, not violence.
36	10	"Web of Evil"	Gary Hartle	Kevin D. Campbell	December 20, 2003
Webstor creates a spider army that threatens to take over Eternia. Moral: Mekaneck and Ram-Man tell the viewer while spiders are an important part of the environment, it's best to keep a safe distance from them unless a parent or teacher says it's okay.
37	11	"Rattle of the Snake"	Gary Hartle	Steve Melching	December 27, 2003
The Heroic Masters track King Hiss through Subternia to a long-lost Snake Temple, which holds the key to releasing a terrible power. Moral: He-Man tells the viewer that holding grudges never really solves anything. It's better to just talk it over, as the problem might be just a misunderstanding, or something that can be easily resolved with an apology.
38	12	"History"	Gary Hartle	Larry DiTillio	January 3, 2004
He-Man must stop King Hiss from reaching the Well of Darkness, not knowing that Evil-Lyn is planning something catastrophic at the Well. Moral: He-Man tells the viewer how trust works both ways and in order to receive someone's trust you have to prove you are trustworthy.
39	13	"Awaken the Serpent"	Gary Hartle	Dean Stefan	January 10, 2004
Using the Medallion of Serpos, King Hiss awakens Serpos from his ancient prison on Eternia. Moral: He-Man and Orko explain to the audience how something does not appear as difficult when you know the steps.
