= He-Man and the Masters of the Universe (2002 TV series) =

American animated television series

- Promotional art for season one
- Also known as: Masters of the Universe vs. The Snake Men (season 2)
- Genre: Action/Adventure; Sword and planet Superhero
- Based on: Masters of the Universe by Mattel
- Developed by: Michael Halperin
- Directed by: Gary Hartle
- Voices of: Cam Clarke; Kathleen Barr; Lisa Ann Beley; Garry Chalk; Brian Dobson; Paul Dobson; Michael Donovan; Scott McNeil; Nicole Oliver; Gabe Khouth; Richard Newman
- Composer: Joseph LoDuca
- Country of origin: United States
- Original language: English
- No. of seasons: 2
- No. of episodes: 39 (list of episodes)

Production
- Executive producer: Bill Schultz
- Producer: Ian Richter
- Editor: Michael Bradley
- Running time: 21–22 minutes
- Production companies: Mike Young Productions; Mattel Playground Productions

Original release
- Network: Cartoon Network
- Release: August 16, 2002 – January 10, 2004

Related
- He-Man and the Masters of the Universe (1983–1985); She-Ra: Princess of Power (1985–1987); She-Ra and the Princesses of Power (2018–2020); He-Man and the Masters of the Universe (2021–2022)

He-Man and the Masters of the Universe (Note: Later referred to as Masters of the Universe vs. The Snake Men during its second season.) is an American animated television series. Developed for television by Michael Halperin, who created the Filmation series, it was animated by Mike Young Productions. It served as an update of the 1980s Filmation series, produced to coincide with Mattel's revival of the Masters of the Universe franchise eleven years after its previous attempt. The series ran on Cartoon Network's Toonami programming block between August 16, 2002, and January 10, 2004.

Unlike the previous He-Man series, set on the futuristic planet of Primus, this version sought to return to the roots of the storyline and provide broader explorations never reached in the first series, including origins for each character, and some first-time animated debuts of familiar toyline faces. The series also brought back several writers from the Filmation series, such as Larry DiTillio and Michael Reaves.

The series has been noted for similarities it shares with the Filmation series. For example, it has an homage intro to the Filmation series' intro speech, but in this version, teenager Prince Adam is interrupted by an explosion and invasion by Skeletor and his henchmen. Prince Adam transforms into He-Man when he says "By the power of Grayskull... I have the power!" (later episodes feature a chorus singing He-Man's name during the scene change). It also features scene change sequences, but only the one involving the Sword of Power was taken from the Filmation series; all the others were created for this series, and the sequences occur less frequently than on the previous series.

== Series overview ==
Season	Episodes	Originally released	
Season	Episodes	First released	Last released
1	26	August 16, 2002	October 11, 2003
2	13	October 18, 2003	January 10, 2004

=== Season 1 ===
The series begins with an attack on the Council of Wisdom, but it is thwarted by Captain Randor and his men. Captain Randor engages in a swordfight with Keldor, who attempts to kill Randor with a vial of acid. Randor deflects the acid back into Keldor's face, causing him to sound the retreat. Zoar informs Captain Randor that the Council has vanished and declared Eternia to become a monarchy, with Captain Randor as king. Zoar also tells Captain Randor he will be responsible for a great hero, but immediately vanishes afterwards. Randor, perplexed by the lack of information, shouts, "How will I know this hero?!"

Years later, Eternia has seen the end of tyranny and evil, and King Randor has married and ruled over a peaceful, prosperous people. Eternians are safe in the knowledge that their greatest threats are trapped behind the great barrier in the badlands near Snake Mountain. However, Skeletor finally breaks through the barrier and seeks to cause havoc once more, beginning with the capture of King Randor. Detecting the breach from within Castle Grayskull, the Sorceress informs Man-At-Arms, Randor's captain of the guards and a trustworthy ally, that the time has come for destiny to be fulfilled. Prince Adam, a spoiled, almost carefree heir-apparent to the throne of his father, Randor, is trained daily by the unrelenting Teela, his best friend. Adam is approached by Teela's father, Man-At-Arms, who takes Adam to Castle Grayskull. There, Adam learns from the Sorceress of an approaching evil which can only be defeated by someone destined to become the warrior He-Man, and is shocked to discover that he is the chosen one. Refusing to accept the responsibility, Adam returns home to find the palace in ruins, and that Skeletor's forces have captured his father. Adam, Man-At-Arms, and Teela pursue Randor's kidnappers into the forests, where they are ambushed. Adam is covered by Man-At-Arms as he returns to Grayskull, followed by his pet tiger Cringer, and the court magician Orko. His flight through the forest infuriates Teela, who only sees a coward leaving the scene of battle. Adam accepts his destiny, and is granted the Sword of Power, which he uses to become He-Man. With Cringer transforming into Battle Cat, a much larger beast strong enough to serve as a steed, He-Man returns to the scene of battle and rescues his father from Skeletor. Over the course of the first season, Randor's defenses expand, with many other fighters joining He-Man's cause. The Sorceress is revealed as the mother of Teela, whose ultimate destiny as the successor to the Sorceress manifests in small doses physically and mentally, often causing her pain or general befuddlement as she struggles to understand them. Skeletor becomes aware of Grayskull's power when he attacks it, prompting him to spend much of the season attempting to enter it. Hints are made as to the fate of Skeletor's mentor, Hordak, and the future main adversaries of the second season, the Snake Men. Much like the Filmation series, selling toys was a key goal of this series, and He-Man and Skeletor would don variations of their costumes or different ones entirely whenever they were briefly "empowered" with an ancient relic or new technology. The first season ends on a cliffhanger in which Skeletor unites several of the other adversaries fought by the Heroic Masters into a grand council of evil. He captures most of the Masters, forcing He-Man and Teela to enter Snake Mountain. Adam becomes separated from his sword, and is soon forced to protect Castle Grayskull from Skeletor without it.

=== Season 2 ===
Season two title

After the events of the season one cliffhanger, which saw Orko returning the sword to Adam and the Heroic Masters rescued, the Snake Men take center stage as the main antagonists, having been hinted in the first season as being trapped beneath Snake Mountain (their own former stronghold) inside a void. They are finally liberated by allies existing outside of the void, as well as a treacherous Evil-Lyn. Adam is informed of their rising by the Sorceress and finds his He-Man armor completely different upon transformation, designed to fight the Snake Men, led by King Hiss. Skeletor would still appear from time to time, but would be gradually phased out, although had the series continued, he would have returned to his status as a major player.

This season was shorter than the first, and as a result, more serialized, with episodes following an established continuity. Characters were strongly developed, and old characters reintroduced, including Fisto, who became Man-At-Arms' brother and a disgraced soldier of the court; he allegedly went AWOL during the last great war, but states he can't remember what actually happened. The third episode of this season, "Out of the Past," also reveals how the Sorceress, on a granted leave from her duties, nursed an amnesia-stricken soldier back to health and fell in love with him, leading to her becoming pregnant with Teela. The soldier left mysteriously before she gave birth, and, due to the series' cancellation, his identity remains unknown; hints given within the season suggest he might be Man-At-Arms, Fisto, or someone else entirely. The secret origins of Skeletor, Snake Mountain, and the power of Castle Grayskull itself, were also revealed.

== Voice cast ==
- Mark Acheson – Fisto, Chadzar
- Kathleen Barr – Evil-Lyn
- Lisa Ann Beley – Teela
- Don Brown – Evilseed
- Garry Chalk – Duncan / Man-At-Arms, Whiplash
- Cam Clarke – Prince Adam / He-Man, King Grayskull
- Brian Dobson – Skeletor / Keldor, Buzz-Off, Webstor, King Hiss, Sssqueeze, Ceratus
- Paul Dobson – Man-E-Faces, Snake Face, Trap Jaw, Tri-Klops, Chief Carnivus
- Michael Donovan – King Randor, Count Marzo, Roboto, Hordak (1st Time), Tung Lashor
- Brian Drummond – Odiphus / Stinkor, Tuvar (Two of Two Bad), Belzar
- Mark Gibbon – Baddhra (Bad of Two Bad)
- Christopher Judge – Zodak
- Gabe Khouth – Mekaneck, Orko
- Scott McNeil – Beast Man, Clawful, Mer-Man, Ram-Man, Stratos, Kobra Khan, Calix
- Colin Murdock – Hordak (second time)
- Richard Newman – General Rattlor, Lord Dactys, The Faceless One, Azdar
- Nicole Oliver – Queen Marlena, The Sorceress of Castle Grayskull
- John Payne – Sy-Klone, Moss Man

The voice director for the series is Michael Donovan.

== DVD releases ==
BCI Eclipse LLC (under license from Mattel Entertainment) released the entire series on DVD in Region 1, for the very first time, in three volume sets in 2008. Each volume contained an extensive array of special features including documentaries, commentaries, DVD-ROM features, end of episode morals, photo galleries and more. In December 2008, BCI Eclipse ceased operations, as a result all releases are now out of print.

In June 2009, Mill Creek Entertainment acquired the rights to the series and subsequently released He-Man and the Masters of the Universe - The Complete Series, a 4-disc box set featuring all 39 episodes of the series on DVD in Region 1 on September 29, 2009. They also released a 10-episode single disc best of DVD on the same day.

To commemorate the 30th anniversary of the Masters of the Universe brand, Mill Creek Entertainment released the 30th Anniversary Commemorative Collection of He-Man and the Masters of the Universe DVD in December 2012. The 22-disc set features all 130 episodes of the 1983 series, 20 fan-favorite episodes of the 1990 series, as well as all 39 episodes of the 2002 series.

DVD name	Ep #	Region 1	Additional information
He-Man and the Masters of the Universe: The Complete Series	39	September 29, 2009	End of Episodes Morals; Interviews with Toyline Artists from Mattel and The Four Horsemen; 12 audio commentaries; Scripts for episodes 1-40; A PDF Comic Book for unproduced episode #40

== Comic book ==
To coincide with the release of the series, a He-Man comic was created by MV Creations. Three separate series were released between 2002–2004: two mini-series, a short-lived ongoing series and a handful of one-shots were published. Some of these were collected into trade paperback graphic novels. The tone and maturity of the comic was slightly different from the cartoon, as the writers hoped to appeal to the older demographic purchasing the comic. The comic ultimately came to a close when Mattel began to end the licensing program for the Masters of the Universe relaunch. The comics were published by Image Comics, then MV Creations themselves (through Crossgen Comics), before eventually going back to Image Comics. MV Creations also made several minicomics which were included with a few of the 200X action figures; they also created a comic of the unproduced episode 40 of the cartoon series, based on Dean Stefan's original screenplay. In the comic - "Captured" - Skeletor retakes Snake Mountain, King Hiss recovers from his injuries after his defeat at the hands of Zodak, and Man-At-Arms is transformed back into a Snake Man.
