= The Grey Knight =

Tabletop role-playing game adventure

- Cover illustration by Susan Seddon Boulet.
- Designers: Larry DiTillio
- Publishers: Chaosium
- Publication: 1986; 39 years ago
- Genres: Arthurian
- Systems: Basic Role-Playing
- ISBN: 0933635354

The Grey Knight is a Arthurian tabletop role-playing adventure, written by Larry DiTillio with art by Susan Seddon Boulet, and published by Chaosium in 1986. This was the first adventure published for the award winning game Pendragon.

== Plot summary ==
The Lady in Black arrives at Camelot's Easter jousting tournament and challenges anyone to fight to the death for King Arthur against her champion, the Grey Knight, over the matter of a shameful incident in Arthur's past. Sir Gawaine accepts the challenge, and the combat is set for six weeks hence. The adventurers, who are all Knights of the Round Table, are sent on a quest to find a special whetstone, one of the Thirteen Treasures of Britain, which will be the key to Gawaine's victory.

== Publication history ==
The Grey Knight, the first adventure published for Pendragon, was written by Larry DiTillio with art by Susan Seddon Boulet, direction by Greg Stafford, and editing and production by Charlie Krank, and was published by Chaosium in 1987 as a 56-page book.

== Reception ==
In the April 1987 edition of White Dwarf (Issue #88), Paul Cockburn thought The Grey Knight was "an excellent role-playing adventure. The balance between cameo role-playing, action encounters and player 'detective' work is just right... The few props are useful, and the artwork captures the romantic atmosphere." He also complimented the layout, in which relevant notes were printed in the margin, saying, "The generous notes in the margin make running the adventure fairly easy." Cockburn did note that "a clearer summary of the adventure for the GM would have been of more use." He concluded with a strong recommendation, saying, "The Grey Knight is the most useful addition to Pendragon so far, and helps set the tone for the game."

In the September 1987 edition of Dragon (Issue #125), Ken Rolston gave this adventure high marks, calling it "A solid winner, best-in-show. This has first-class visuals, superb narrative values, an innovative layout that permits ease of reference with minimum interference with the narrative, and creditable showings in the staging and nice-bits categories." Although Rolston admired the artwork and layout, he thought "The adventure itself is the real prize. The author, Larry DiTillio, is a master narrative technician, and he’s working with the rich resources of the Arthurian legend and the unique Pendragon game system, designed by Greg Stafford to support moral dilemmas and tests of character as well as hack-and-slash combat and fireball barbecues." Rolston also complimented the usefulness of the margin notes, but did note that the statistics of the monsters were not given in the adventure — the gamemaster has to refer to the main Pendragon rules for those -- and no staging tips for combats were provided. However, he concluded with a strong recommendation, calling the adventure, "Fine writing and illustration with exceptional tone and richness. Modest player characters enter into an epic landscape and narrative. Innovative design and presentation. Bravo. Bravissimo."

Stewart Wieck reviewed The Grey Knight in White Wolf #7 (1987), rating it a 10 out of 10 and stated that "A truly marvelous adventure by Larry DiTillio that utilizes the Pendragon system to its fullest."
