= Masks of Nyarlathotep =

Horror tabletop role-playing game campaign

The Complete Masks of Nyarlathotep
Perilous Adventures to Thwart the Dark God
- 1st edition cover by Tom Sullivan, 1996.
- Designers: Larry DiTillio; Lynn Willis
- Publishers: Chaosium
- Publication: 1984 1st Edition, Masks of Nyarlathotep, boxed set; 1989 2nd edition, Masks of Nyarlathotep, softcover; 1996 3rd edition, The Complete Masks of Nyarlathotep, softcover; 2010 4th edition, Masks of Nyarlathotep, hard & softcover; 2018 5th edition, Masks of Nyarlathotep, two-volume slipcase set.
- Genres: Horror
- Systems: Basic Role-Playing

Masks of Nyarlathotep, subtitled Perilous Adventures to Thwart the Dark God, is an adventure campaign first published by Chaosium in 1984 for the second edition of the horror role-playing game Call of Cthulhu. A number of revised editions have subsequently been published. Masks of Nyarlathotep is a series of several sequential adventures set in the 1920s that take the player characters from New York, to London, Cairo, Nairobi, and Shanghai (with Australia and then Peru added in subsequent editions) as they deal with the threat of the god Nyarlathotep. Screenwriter Larry DiTillio wrote the adventure with game designer Lynn Willis during a writer's strike. It received positive reviews in game periodicals including Casus Belli, The Space Gamer, White Dwarf, Different Worlds, and Dragon, and is considered to be one of the best roleplaying adventures of all time.

== Description ==
Masks of Nyarlathotep is a series of sequential adventures set in the 1920s that pit the investigators against Nyarlathotep, the Crawling Chaos and Outer God. The original version had five adventures, and in the edition published in 1996 the number of adventures was increased to six, and this was increased to seven in the 2018 version. There are a variety of handouts given to the players at various points; these include newspaper clippings, handwritten letters, business cards and a matchbox.

The first edition of the campaign spanned five chapters:

1. New York: the investigators are drawn into the campaign by a gruesome death.
2. Following clues, the investigators move to London, seeking information both on a mysterious cult, and the ill-fated Carlyle Expedition.
3. The investigators move to Cairo, where they follow various clues, some of them red herrings.
4. The fourth chapter is set in and around Nairobi, as the investigators try to discover how the Carlyle Expedition came to an end.
5. The last chapter takes the investigators to Shanghai, where they must put all the clues together to bring a dangerous threat to an end.

== Publication history ==
Masks of Nyarlathotep was written by Larry DiTillio with Lynn Willis, and was published by Chaosium in 1984 as a boxed set with two 32-page books, a 28-page book, a 20-page book, and a 16-page book, a 4-page pamphlet, and handouts. A second edition with a cover by Lee Gibbons was published in 1989 as a 160-page book with eight color plates.

In 1984, while Larry DiTillio was on strike from his job as a television and movie screenwriter, he earned income by writing role-playing adventures for various companies. One such assignment was Masks of Nyarlathotep for Chaosium, a five-part adventure for the second edition of Call of Cthulhu that he co-wrote with Lynn Willis. A sixth chapter written by DiTillio set in Australia was cut from the final product due to space limitations. The campaign was published in 1984 as a boxed set that included five books (one for each chapter of the adventure), a 4-page player introduction, an index sheet for the gamemaster's reference, and a cardstock sheet from which a number of separate player handouts could be cut out.

Five years later, Chaosium revised the campaign for the 4th edition of Call of Cthulhu, and published it as a single 160-page perfect-bound softcover book that included eight color plates of scenes from the adventures rendered by Nick Smith, Keith Berdak, Tom Sullivan, and Mark Roland, as well as full color cover art by Lee Gibbons. In this and all subsequent editions, the player handouts previously printed on a separate cardstock sheet were incorporated into the pages of the book, requiring the gamemaster to either cut them out of the book or to photocopy them.

In 1996, the Australia chapter that had been cut from the original edition was included in a revision for the 5th edition of Call of Cthulhu, which was retitled The Complete Masks of Nyarlathotep. A version of this for the 6th edition of Call of Cthulhu was published in 2006.

In 2010, a new edition returned to the original title Masks of Nyarlathotep, with both softcover and hardcover editions.

In 2018, the game was revised and updated for use with the 7th edition of Call of Cthulhu and the Pulp Cthulhu supplement, and was released as a two-volume slipcase with a gamemaster's screen. New material included a new chapter set in Peru.

=== Editions ===
- Masks of Nyarlathotep, 1st edition (for 2nd edition of Call of Cthulhu), CHA2307-X, boxed set, 1984
- Masks of Nyarlathotep, 2nd edition (for 4th edition of Call of Cthulhu), CHA3304, softcover, 1989.
- The Complete Masks of Nyarlathotep, 3rd edition, (for 5th edition of Call of Cthulhu), CHA2361, softcover, 1996.
- The Complete Masks of Nyarlathotep, 3rd edition, (for 6th edition of Call of Cthulhu), CHA2361-H, hardcover, 2006
- Masks of Nyarlathotep, 4th edition, (for 6th edition of Call of Cthulhu), both softcover (CHA23118) and hardcover (CHA23118h), 2010.
- Masks of Nyarlathotep, 5th edition, (for 7th edition of Call of Cthulhu), two-volume slipcase set, CHA23153-X, 2018.

== Reception ==
In the April 1985 edition of the French games magazine Casus Belli (Issue #25), Martin Latallo questioned the implausibility of ordinary people suddenly uprooting themselves to risk their lives, noting "most of these encounters and discoveries are fatal in themselves, which presents the central problem of the campaign: what can five unfortunate investigators do against an organization which covers the globe and which enjoys the support of the Old Ones? These modules constitute without a doubt the most deadly campaign ever created by Chaosium, where the stakes are enormous, the dangers immense, and the rewards meager." However, he concluded with a strong recommendation, saying, "An excellent campaign despite everything."

In the May–June 1985 edition of The Space Gamer (No. 74), Matthew J. Costello was impressed, saying "The project is, in sum, massive and largely successful. Perhaps only TSR's Dragonlance series rivals it in size. And while some flavor may have escaped from this ghoulish stew, there's much here to delight Keepers, Investigators, and admirers of H.P. Lovecraft."

In the November 1985 edition of White Dwarf (Issue #71), Phil Frances lauded this book as "undoutedly the finest... supplement to come from Chaosium." Frances believed the series of adventures presented several possible problems, including a plot that was too complex for beginning gamemasters, and the high mortality rate among adventurers due to the extremely deadly adversaries. He concluded by giving it an excellent rating of 9 out of 9, saying "Masks Of Nyarlathotep is an adventure that is fun for both sides to play... This is the best campaign I have ever seen, from Chaosium or other sources."

In the January–February 1986 edition of Different Worlds (Issue 41), Willam A. Barton called it "the finest scenario pack ever designed for Call of Cthulhu. Or for any other game, for that matter." He thought that "the amount of material packed into Masks's slender box" would "keep a Cthulhu campaign going for months." Barton did warn that this was far too complex for either new players or an inexperienced gamemaster, but concluded by giving the game a perfect rating of 4 out of 4, saying, "an excellently conceived and executed scenario pack that will challenge the most experienced Cthulhu players to the utmost."

In Issue 39 of the French games magazine Jeux & Stratégie, Michel Brassinne commented, "Completed several 'standard' scenarios? Try this 'monument' and judge for yourself! ... A campaign rather recommended for experienced players and game leaders; it will ensure them nights and nights of nightmares. What a treat!"

In the June 1990 edition of Dragon (Issue 158), Jim Bambra reviewed the second edition of the game and said this book included "some of the most powerful and deadly adventures ever written." Bambra lauded the "superb narrative and the tantalizing clues [that] carry the Investigators along at a cracking pace." He concluded, "Masks of Nyarlathotep is the epitome of COC adventures. It contains detective work, action, and indescribable horrors in all the right quantities. The writing and editing are first class; the adventures perfectly capture what COC is all about. No one should be without a copy of Masks of Nyarlathotep."

According to game historian Shannon Appelcline, Masks of Nyarlathotep is considered by many critics to be one of the best roleplaying adventures of all time.

In his 2023 book Monsters, Aliens, and Holes in the Ground, RPG historian Stu Horvath noted, "There's something special about this box. It puts forth a thrilling, globe-trotting adventure that begins with a murder and, inches by inches, reveals a vast, international occult conspiracy ...Players can move around the world at will, chasing threads as they please, so long as the doomsday clock still has time left on it." Horvath also complimented the multiple handouts, commenting, "When players aren't doing their best to avoid dying at the hands of cultists, the immediacy of the campaign is maintained, in part, by plentiful player handouts, designed with an eye toward tactile realism." However, Horvath did point out that "Masks of Nyarlathotep isn't perfect ... it isn't easy for newcomers to run. There wasn't much of an understanding of how to support a GM in running such a large campaign in 1984 ... [It] isn't easy on players, either. Those new to roleplaying, in general, or Call of Cthulhu, in particular, are probably out of their depth." Horvath also felt the game "also has trouble navigating the inherent pitfalls of playing through a story modeled after the work of H.P. Lovecraft and other pulpsmiths during the 1920s. There is an obvious gender imbalance, a good portion of the villains are cliched dark-skinned foreigners, and there are some tasteless depictions of sex rituals." Horvath did note that some of the cultural issues had been resolved in the 2018 revision.

== Other reviews ==
- Game News #6 (Aug., 1985)

== Awards ==
- At the 1997 Origins Awards, the third edition titled The Complete Masks of Nyarlathotep won Best Role-Playing Adventure of 1996.
- At the 2019 ENnie Awards, the fifth edition won "Best Adventure" (Gold).

== Adaptions ==
In 2018 Dark Adventure Radio Theatre, a subsidiary of The H. P. Lovecraft Historical Society, released Masks of Nyarlathotep, a 1930s radio-style play of the story with a full cast, based on the fifth edition of the Chaosium campaign. Unlike the majority of 'Dark Adventures' releases, which normally run for a little over an hour, The Masks of Nyarlathotep runs for more than seven hours, making it by far their longest production. The recording was awarded the prestigious ENNIE Award for the "Best RPG Related Product" in 2019.
