= Larry DiTillio =

American writer and game designer

- Born: Lawrence G. DiTillio; February 15, 1948
- Died: March 16, 2019 (aged 71)
- Occupation: Television writer
- Years active: 1970–2009

Lawrence G. DiTillio (February 15, 1948 – March 16, 2019) was an American film, TV series, and tabletop role-playing game writer. His creations include He-Man and She-Ra: The Secret of the Sword and the award-winning Masks of Nyarlathotep.

== Education ==
Larry DiTillio attended the film school at New York University for four years. He then spent an additional two years at UCLA's film school.

== Career ==
After graduating, DiTillio decided to make a career as a Hollywood writer. He knocked on agency doors until he found an agent willing and able to find him work as a film writer. DiTillio wrote for both television and movies in the 1970s, including a stint on Filmation's Fat Albert and the Cosby Kids. He then became a staff writer for the original He-Man and the Masters of the Universe series and over its two seasons, wrote 17 episodes, more than anyone else. He also directed one episode.

During a writers' strike in 1983, DiTillio searched for other ways to generate income through writing, so he was hired by Flying Buffalo. DiTillio wrote The Isle of Darksmoke (1984), the final multiplayer Tunnels & Trolls adventure that Flying Buffalo published. DiTillio also collaborated with Lynn Willis to create the world-spanning campaign Masks of Nyarlathotep (1984) for Chaosium's Call of Cthulhu, which author Shannon Appelcine states is considered one of the best roleplaying adventures of all time, and won an Origins Award. For a few months, DiTillio was also a contributor to Chaosium's Different Worlds magazine, writing about news from the world of film and television in his "The Sword of Hollywood" column. Other Chaosium titles he wrote or contributed to, include; The Grey Knight, the first adventure for the Pendragon role-playing game, Demon Magic: The Second Stormbringer Companion for the Stormbringer fantasy role-playing game, and the Call of Cthulhu supplement Terror Australis.

Despite his success in the role-playing games industry, once the screenwriters' strike ended, DiTillio went back to screenwriting.

In 1985, he wrote the feature-length film He-Man and She-Ra: Secret of the Sword. Following its release, he and J. Michael Straczynski became writers for Filmation's spin-off show She-Ra: Princess of Power. DiTillio created the show bible for the spinoff show and invented most of the character names. Straczynski later recalled the considerable time DiTillio spent writing character background for the show. "One of the things Larry and I decided, very early on, was that She-Ra couldn't just be 'He-Man with boobs.' The show had to go deeper than that, especially given that we were creating this for a female lead character." However, when Filmation refused to give them credit on-screen, both left, finding work with DIC Entertainment on Jayce and the Wheeled Warriors.

In 1993, DiTillio worked with Straczynski again, this time on the science-fiction series Babylon 5, with Straczynski as producer and DiTillio the executive story editor. DiTillio also worked on the animated series Beast Wars, writing or co-writing most of the episodes. In 2002, he was a writer for the updated He-Man and the Masters of the Universe series.

DiTillio died at the age of 71 on March 16, 2019.

== Filmography ==
| Year | Role | Show |
|---|---|---|
| 1972 | Writer | Those Mad, Mad Moviemakers |
| 1984 | Writer | Fat Albert and the Cosby Kids |
| 1985 | Writer | He-Man and She-Ra: The Secret of the Sword |
| 1985 | Writer | Jayce and the Wheeled Warriors (7 episodes) |
| 1983–85 | Writer | He-Man and the Masters of the Universe (17 episodes) |
| 1985 | Writer | She-Ra: Princess of Power (18 episodes) |
| 1985–86 | Writer | Hulk Hogan's Rock 'n' Wrestling |
| 1986 | Writer | The Centurions |
| 1986 | Writer | Galaxy High |
| 1987 | Writer | Bionic Six |
| 1987-88 | Writer | Captain Power and the Soldiers of the Future |
| 1988 | Writer | Superman (2 episodes) |
| 1989 | Writer | The California Raisin Show (5 episodes) |
| 1989 | Writer | Captain Power: The Beginning (TV Movie) |
| 1987 | Writer | The Real Ghostbusters |
| 1990 | Writer | Swamp Thing |
| 1990 | Writer | Deadly Nightmares |
| 1990 | Writer | Peter Pan & the Pirates |
| 1991 | Writer | The Hidden Room (TV series) |
| 1991 | Writer | Murder, She Wrote (1 Episode) |
| 1992 | Writer | Conan the Adventurer |
| 1994–95 | Writer/Executive Story Editor | Babylon 5 |
| 1996 | Writer | Hypernauts |
| 1996–99 | Writer/Story Editor | Beast Wars: Transformers |
| 2002–04 | Writer | He-Man and the Masters of the Universe |
| 2005 | Writer | Kong: The Animated Series |
| 2009 | Writer | Transformers: Animated |
