= Ross Watson (game designer) =

Role-playing game designer

- Born: May 22, 1975 (age 51); Fayetteville, Arkansas, U.S.
- Occupations: Game Designer, Writer

Ross Watson (born May 22, 1975) is a designer of computer, miniature and role-playing games and a writer in various genres. Watson worked on the Warhammer 40,000 Roleplay line as the lead developer for Dark Heresy, was the lead designer for Rogue Trader and Deathwatch, and was part of the design team for Black Crusade. He was the lead developer for both Aaron Allston's Strike Force and Savage Worlds Rifts. His written works include the Accursed and Weird War I settings for Savage Worlds, contributions to the Star Wars: Edge of the Empire RPG, and the video games Darksiders II, Warhammer 40,000: Regicide, and Battlefleet Gothic: Armada. Watson has designed rules and scenarios for miniature game lines, such as Dust Warfare, and he has written for several card games, including Warhammer: Invasion, Empire Engine, and the Lost Legacy series.

== Early life ==
Watson was born in Fayetteville, Arkansas. He has been a lifelong gamer, starting at age eleven. His first year of employment was as a landscaper/lawn mower in Hot Springs, Arksansas.

Watson was introduced to role-playing games by his father in Evanston, Wyoming during 1986. He started out playing Dungeons & Dragons, and by the time he was in high school, he was playing several different systems at the same time: Robotech, TMNT, Rifts, Star Wars, and Marvel Super Heroes. Watson was often asked to come up with the stories and adventures for these games during lunch, building his ability to improvise and connect narratives. Watson said, "My father brought home this red box labeled ‘Dungeons & Dragons.’ He told me that ‘it looked interesting,’ and that I should ‘really learn how to play it.’ So I did."

Watson first became interested in wargaming during high school. During his enlistment in the United States Army at Fort Knox, Kentucky, Watson became involved with a local group playing Warhammer 40,000. Since 1999, he has been a miniature war-gaming enthusiast.

== Career ==
=== D20 ===
Watson's involvement in the Louisville, Kentucky gaming scene led to his employment as the D20 Line Editor at Citizen Games. He helped develop and write several products for Citizen Games and parlayed that success into freelance writing for other companies such as Atlas Games and Fantasy Flight Games. Watson wrote for several D20 projects, including the Penumbra Fantasy Bestiary, Sorcery & Steam, and the award-winning Dawnforge: Crucible of Legend. Wizards of the Coast tapped Watson to edit the Complete Divine sourcebook for Dungeons & Dragons 3.5.

=== Games Workshop ===
In late 2003, Watson was employed as a copywriter/editor at Games Workshop in Glen Burnie, Maryland. He joined the US White Dwarf team creating content for the magazine for Warhammer 40,000, Warhammer Fantasy, and The Lord of the Rings Fantasy Battle Game.

=== Fantasy Flight Games ===
Watson was hired in 2008 by Fantasy Flight Games after that company acquired the license for Warhammer 40,000 Roleplay. He joined the company as the lead developer for Dark Heresy, became the principal architect of Rogue Trader and Deathwatch, and helped design Black Crusade. Watson worked on over fifty products across the Warhammer 40,000 Roleplay lines. While at Fantasy Flight Games, Watson consulted on several Warhammer 40,000-themed games made at the company, such as Relic, Space Hulk: Death Angel, and Horus Heresy. He developed the Dust Warfare miniatures game and contributed to the design of Star Wars: Edge of the Empire.

=== Accursed ===
In 2013, Watson teamed up with John Dunn and Jason Marker to produce Accursed, a campaign setting of Watson's own design for Savage Worlds. Accursed was successfully kickstarted, and several titles for the line have been produced. Accursed is a campaign setting that "combines Hellboy with Solomon Kane," where the players take on the roles of classic monsters fighting against evil witches who have conquered their land.

=== Evil Beagle Games ===
Watson joined Evil Beagle Games as a partner with the company's founder, Sean Patrick Fannon, in 2014. Watson became the company's managing director and has overseen the production of books for Shaintar, a high-fantasy setting for the Savage Worlds RPG. In 2015, it was announced that Evil Beagle Games, with Watson as lead developer, would be working with Palladium Books and Pinnacle Entertainment Group to produce Savage Rifts, an adaptation of the Rifts setting to Savage Worlds. Evil Beagle also collaborated with High Rock publishing, again with Watson as lead developer, to create a new edition of Aaron Allston's Strike Force in 2016.

=== Ulisses Spiele ===
Watson joined Ulisses Spiele in early 2017 to develop a new Warhammer 40,000 Roleplaying Game. This RPG line eventually became Wrath & Glory, using a game system designed by Watson. Wrath & Glory initially launched with Ulisses Spiele but would eventually become transferred to Cubicle 7 in 2019. Afterwards, Watson went to work designing an RPG named Myth: Tales of Legend, based on the board game Myth by Megacon Games.

=== Freelance Work ===
Watson has worked as a freelance writer, game designer, and IP consultant since 2001. He consulted with Catalyst Game Labs on Shadowrun 5th edition and has designed several game products for Pinnacle Entertainment Group, including Lankhmar: City of Thieves and the Last Parsec. Watson contributed to the No Quarter Presents: Urban Adventure project for Privateer Press and In Defense of Innocence for Wyrd Games.

=== Podcast and Blog ===
The Rogue Warden is Watson's personal blog about gaming that he started in 2012. It was nominated for an ENNie Award in 2013, and has since been combined with his personal web page. Watson hosted the Gamer's Tavern podcast, a show discussing gaming and game design. In mid-2016, he stepped down from hosting the podcast.

=== Video games ===
Watson worked as a narrative designer on Dark Millennium Online, Warhammer 40,000: Regicide, and Darksiders II. For Regicide, he wrote the main story, cutscenes, and in-game dialogue. On Darksiders II, Watson worked on portions of the main game's script and wrote the stories and dialogue for all three DLCs. He wrote the dialogue, story, and promotional trailers for Battlefleet Gothic: Armada.

== Bibliography ==
=== Fiction ===
- Accursed
  - Pirate's Oath (2016)
- Deadzone
  - Containment Protocols (2014)

=== Role-playing books ===
- Dark Heresy
  - Disciples of the Dark Gods, ISBN 9781844164493
  - Creatures Anathema, ISBN 978-1-58994-548-7
  - Ascension, ISBN 9781589947115
  - The Radical’s Handbook, ISBN 9781589945494
  - Blood of Martyrs, ISBN 9781589947665
  - The Haalock’s Legacy Trilogy, ISBN 9781589947696
  - Daemon Hunter, ISBN 9781589947658
  - The Church of the Damned, ISBN 9781589947627
  - The Black Sepulchre, ISBN 1589947614
  - The Book of Judgement, ISBN 9781589947603
  - The Lathe Worlds, ISBN 9781589947689
  - Salvation Demands Sacrifice
  - Heed the Higher Call
  - Heresy Begets Retribution
  - Edge of Darkness
  - Knowledge is Power
- Rogue Trader
  - Rogue Trader Core Rulebook, ISBN 9781589946750
  - Lure of the Expanse, ISBN 9781589947948
  - Edge of the Abyss, ISBN 9781589947955
  - Into the Storm, ISBN 9781589947269
  - Hostile Acquisitions, ISBN 9781589948006
  - The Warpstorm Trilogy Part II: Citadel of Skulls, ISBN 9781589947979
  - The Warpstorm Trilogy Part III: Fallen Suns, ISBN 9781589947979
  - Battlefleet Koronus, ISBN 9781589947993
  - The Navis Primer, ISBN 9781616614683
  - Forsaken Bounty
  - Dark Frontier
  - Secrets of the Expanse
  - Epoch Koronus
  - Drydock
- Deathwatch
  - Deathwatch Core Rulebook, ISBN 9781589947788
  - The Emperor Protects, ISBN 9781589947801
  - Rites of Battle, ISBN 9781589947818
  - Mark of the Xenos, ISBN 9781589947818
  - The Achilus Assault, ISBN 9781589947832
  - First Founding, ISBN 9781589947849
  - The Jericho Reach, ISBN 9781589947849
  - Rising Tempest, ISBN 9781616614003
  - The Nemesis Incident
  - Litany of War
  - Final Sanction
  - Oblivion’s Edge
  - Know No Fear
- Black Crusade
  - Black Crusade Core Rulebook, ISBN 9781616611439
  - The Tome of Fate, ISBN 9781616614331
- Only War
  - Enemies of the Imperium, ISBN 9781616616847
  - Hammer of the Emperor, ISBN 9781616616557
  - Shield of Humanity
- Savage Worlds
  - Accursed, ISBN 9780991343607
  - Accursed: Ill Omens, ISBN 9780991343621
  - Accursed: Sand and Stone
  - Accursed: The Banshee of Loch Finnere
  - Accursed: The Guns of Dagerov
  - Accursed: Fall of the Tower
  - Accursed: World of Morden
  - Accursed: Hatred’s Snare
  - Accursed: Distant Dream
  - Accursed: Pirate’s Oath: An Accursed Novella
  - Accursed: Season of the Witch
  - Accursed: Jumpstart
  - Darkest Tides
  - Freedom Squadron: Secret in the Ice
  - Lankhmar: City of Thieves
  - Lankhmar: Savage Foes of Nehwon
  - The Last Parsec: Primer
  - Primeval Thule (Savage Worlds Edition)
  - Rifts: Collector's Box Set
  - Rifts: The Tomorrow Legion Player’s Guide
  - Rifts: Game Master’s Guide
  - Rifts: The Garnet Town Gambit
  - Rifts: Savage Foes of North America
  - Rifts: Tome of Destiny
  - Rifts: Murderthon
  - Rifts: Blood Menagerie
  - Rifts: Return to Sender
  - Rifts: Negotiation by Fire
  - Rifts: Rift Invasion
  - Rifts: Rite of Passage
  - Savage Lairs: Fantasy Forests ISBN 9780991343645
  - Savage Tales of Horror: Volume 3
  - Weird War I: War Master’s Handbook
- Through the Breach (1st and 2nd Editions)
  - Penny Dreadful: In Defense of Innocence
- TORG: Eternity
  - TORG: Eternity – Core Rules ISBN 9783957526830
  - TORG: Eternity - The Living Land Sourcebook
  - Delphi Missions: Rising Storm
  - Ruins of the Living Land
  - Free RPG Day Special
- Warhammer Fantasy Roleplay (3rd Edition)
  - Black Fire Pass ISBN 9781589948150
  - Black Fire Pass: A Guide to Adventures on the Fringe of the Empire
  - Book of Grudges: A Guide to Dwarfs &amp; the Everlasting Realm
  - Wrath &amp; Glory (Ulisses Spiele and Cubicle 7 Editions)
  - Revelations
  - Blessings Unheralded
  - Dark Tides
  - Wrath &amp; Glory Core Rules
  - Starter Set

=== Other Role-playing Games ===
- 1000 Faces: Villains &amp; Scoundrels ISBN 9781929474332
- Aaron Allston's Strike Force
- Complete Divine, ISBN 9780786932726
- Dawnforge: Crucible of Legend, ISBN 1589941241
- D&D 5e: Feast of Tigers
- Kids on Bikes: Deluxe Edition
- Myth: Tales of Legend: The Lost Barrow
- No Quarter Presents: Urban Adventure, ISBN 9781589780309
- The Penumbra Fantasy Bestiary, ISBN 9781589780309
- Sorcery & Steam
- Star Wars: Edge of the Empire, ISBN 9781616616571

=== Miniatures Games ===
- Dust Warfare, ISBN 9781616612030

=== Card Games ===
- Empire Engine
- Game of Crowns
- Lost Legacy
- Mystic Vale
- Warhammer: Invasion
