= Andy Chambers =

English author and game designer (born 1966)

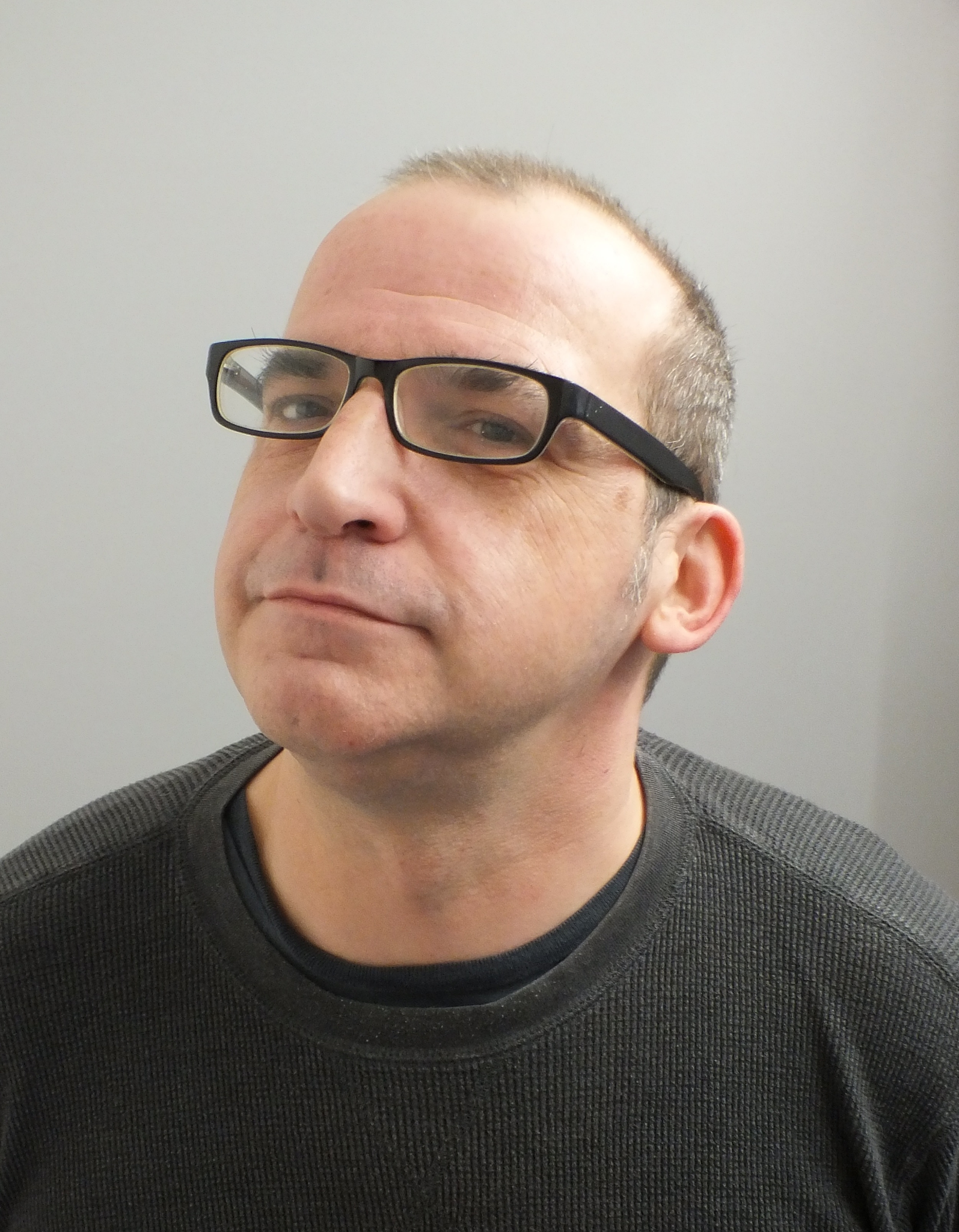
- (photo Dec 2015)
- Born: 20 October 1966 (age 60); Nottingham, Nottinghamshire, England
- Occupations: Wargame designer, writer
- Spouse: Jessica Chambers

Andy Chambers (born 20 October 1966) is an English author and game designer best known for his work on over 30 Games Workshop rulebooks and sourcebooks.

== Personal life ==
In 2003, he married Jessica Chambers after they met at KublaCon 2002.

== Career ==
Chambers worked for Games Workshop from March 1990 to March 2004. He worked extensively on various Warhammer 40,000 rulebooks and sourcebooks, and also authored multiple fiction novels set in the same universe. Chambers was the lead designer on a number of Warhammer 40,000 spin-off games, such as Necromunda (1995) and Battlefleet Gothic (1999), produced by Specialist Games. These games were released at a time of major growth for Games Workshop and "were designed with expansions and more miniatures sales in mind".

In 2003, Chambers joined Mongoose Publishing as the lead designer of the company's development team for the Starship Troopers tabletop miniatures game. Starship Troopers won "Best New Game" in the 2005 Origins Awards.

Chambers was the Lead Story Writer for Blizzard Entertainment, for StarCraft II: Wings of Liberty. According to Megan Farokhmanesh, "much of the groundwork on Wings of Liberty was done, but it was Andy Chambers who finished the title".

Between 2005 and 2018, Chambers wrote several books and novellas set in Warhammer 40,000 and the majority were about the Dark Eldar. Antony Jones, for SFBook in his review of Path of the Renegade (Dark Eldar Book 1), wrote "I loved how the author manages to elevate the Dark Eldar above that of humanity by describing games played with human captives as they watch them around a human size maze, the humans think they are really escaping but in reality being directed at every turn and watched over by their Eldar masters - very much like mice overlooked by people in white coats. [...] There aren't many novels that focus purely on the evil and even fewer that manage to pull it of effectively but Chambers does an excellent job here, it's one of the best examples I've read".

On 14 May 2012 Dust Warfare, written by Andy Chambers, was released by Fantasy Flight Games. In June 2013, Fantasy Flight Games announced that New Zealand-based Battlefront Miniatures would take over distribution of both Dust Warfare and Dust Tactics.

In 2015, Chambers became a Creative Director at Reforged Studios. Chambers, Tuomas Pirinen, and Ryan Miller created the skirmish board game Warforged: First Contact for Reforged Studios and Ninja Division Publishing who planned to bring it to market through a Kickstarter campaign. While the campaign beat its goal of $60,000, the campaign was cancelled before the Kickstarter ended. There has been no update on the game since April 2017.

Chambers and David Lewis received a nomination together in the 2017 Origins Awards "Miniatures" category for Dropfleet Commander by Hawk Wargames. In 2017, he created Blood Red Skies, an air combat miniature game, which was released by Warlord Games. He also created multiple expansions for the game between 2017 and 2019. Matt Jarvis, in a review of Blood Red Skies: Battle of Britain for Tabletop Gaming, wrote "abstracting altitude, position, damage levels and more into a single visual cue is a brilliant touch, making the slick ruleset effortless to execute and every battle look cinematic – closing in on a plane with its nose already pointed at the floor is an exciting moment, especially when combined with the simple but effective rules for tailing. [...] With a bit of tightening up, Blood Red Skies could be a strong contender for an involving tournament and spectator game – at the moment, it's just a little too loose for anything but casual play. [...] But you know what? None of that really mattered a smidge while I was actually playing Blood Red Skies, because I was just having such a fun time watching my squadrons zip through clouds, around anti-air defences and unleash bursts of machine-gun fire on enemy pilots who would similarly dance around, whizzing between the tips of wings to try and zero in". Chambers also designed Strontium Dogs, a skirmish game, which was released by Warlord Games in 2018.

In 2019, Chambers was a contributor to Frostgrave: The Wizard's Conclave. In his chapter “The Abandoned Workshop”, "warbands vie for control of powerful magical construct that is guarding a workshop full of potions. The conflict with the construct takes place in a confined space, with warbands trying to avoid attacks while gathering treasure".

== Works ==
=== Board games, card games and miniature games ===
Title	Game	Credits	Date
Warhammer: The Game of Fantasy Battles (4th Edition)	Warhammer (4th Edition)	Designer	1992
Warhammer: Battle Magic	Warhammer (4th Edition)	Designer	1992
Renegades: Eldar and Chaos Armies for Space Marine	Space Marine	Designer	1992
Ork and Squat Warlords	Space Marine	Designer	1992
Warhammer Armies: Skaven	Warhammer (4th Edition)	Designer	1993
Warhammer Armies: High Elves	Warhammer (4th Edition)	Designer	1993
Space Marine Battles	Space Marine (2nd edition)	Designer	1993
Warhammer 40,000	Warhammer 40,000 (Second edition)	Designer	1993
Titan Legions	Adeptus Titanicus	Designer	1994
Warhammer 40,000 Codex	Warhammer 40,000 (Second edition)	Designer	1994
Dark Millennium	Warhammer 40,000 (Second edition)	Designer	1994
Warhammer 40,000 Battles	Warhammer 40,000 (Second edition)	Designer	1995
Necromunda	Necromunda (First edition)	Designer	1995
Hive War	Space Marine (2nd edition)	Designer	1995
Space Hulk	Space Hulk (2nd edition)	Designer	1996
Necromunda: Outlanders	Necromunda (1st edition)	Designer	1996
Warhammer Epic 40,000	Warhammer Epic 40k (3rd edition)	Designer	1997
Warhammer Armies: High Elves	Warhammer (5th Edition)	Designer	1997
Warhammer 40,000: Storm of Vengeance	Warhammer 40,000 (2nd edition)	Designer	1997
Necromunda: Battles in the Underhive	Necromunda (1st edition)	Designer	1997
Gorkamorka	Gorkamorka (1st edition)	Designer	1997
Spaceship Battles	Warhammer Specialist Game	Designer	1998
Bommerz over da Sulphur River	Warhammer Specialist Game	Designer	1998
Battlefleet Gothic	Warhammer Battlefleet Gothic	Designer	1999
Warp Storm	Warhammer Battlefleet Gothic	Designer	2000
Warhammer 40,000: Chapter Approved	Warhammer 40,000 (3rd edition)	Designer	2001
Warhammer: Skaven	Warhammer (6th Edition)	Designer	2002
Warhammer 40,000: Battle for Macragge	Warhammer 40,000 (4th edition)	Designer	2004
Warhammer 40,000 (Fourth Edition)	Warhammer 40,000 (4th edition)	Designer	2004
Starship Troopers Miniatures Game	Starship Troopers: The Miniatures Game	Designer	2005
Battlefleet Gothic Armada	Warhammer Battlefleet Gothic	Designer	2005
Dust Warfare Core Book	Dust Warfare	Designer	2012
Flame War	Flame War (card game)	Designer	2012
Fanticide	Fanticide	Designer	2012
Bolt Action: Armies of the Soviet Union	Bolt Action	Designer	2013
Bolt Action: Ostfront – Barbarossa to Berlin	Bolt Action	Designer	2015
Bolt Action: Empires In Flames	Bolt Action	Designer	2015
Dropfleet Commander	Dropzone Commander	Designer	2016
Dark Deeds	Dark Deeds (card game)	Designer	2016
Darker Deeds	Dark Deeds (card game)	Designer	2017
Blood Red Skies	Blood Red Skies	Designer	2017
Blood Red Skies: Yakovlev Yak-1 Squadron	Blood Red Skies	Designer	2017
Blood Red Skies: US Ace Pilot – George Preddy	Blood Red Skies	Designer	2017
Blood Red Skies: Supermarine Spitfire MK.II Squadron	Blood Red Skies	Designer	2017
Blood Red Skies: Soviet Ace Pilot – Lydia Litvyak	Blood Red Skies	Designer	2017
Blood Red Skies: P-51 Mustang Squadron	Blood Red Skies	Designer	2017
Blood Red Skies: Mitsubishi A6-M5 Zero Squadron	Blood Red Skies	Designer	2017
Blood Red Skies: Messerschmitt BF109 E Squadron	Blood Red Skies	Designer	2017
Blood Red Skies: Japanese Ace Pilot – Saburo Sakai	Blood Red Skies	Designer	2017
Blood Red Skies: German Ace Pilot – Adolf Galland	Blood Red Skies	Designer	2017
Blood Red Skies: British Ace Pilot – 'Sailor' Malan	Blood Red Skies	Designer	2017
Blood Red Skies: Boulton Paul Defiant Mk I	Blood Red Skies	Designer	2017
Warforged: First Contact	Warforged: First Contact (board game)	Designer	2018
Strontium Dog: The Good, the Bad, & the Mutie Starter Set	Strontium Dog	Designer	2018
Strontium Dog: Rulebook	Strontium Dog	Designer	2018
Blood Red Skies: British Ace Pilot – Douglas Bader	Blood Red Skies	Designer	2018
Blood Red Skies: British – Bristol Blenheim Mk IV Bomber	Blood Red Skies	Designer	2018
Blood Red Skies: de Havilland Mosquito Squadron	Blood Red Skies	Designer	2018
Blood Red Skies: German – Junkers Ju 52	Blood Red Skies	Designer	2018
Blood Red Skies: German – Junkers Ju 88 A Bomber	Blood Red Skies	Designer	2018
Blood Red Skies: Hawker Hurricane Squadron	Blood Red Skies	Designer	2018
Blood Red Skies: Soviet – Liszunov Li-2	Blood Red Skies	Designer	2018
Blood Red Skies: Soviet – Tupolev ANT-40 (SB-2) Bomber	Blood Red Skies	Designer	2018
Blood Red Skies: Allied Ace Pilot – Witold Urbanowicz	Blood Red Skies	Designer	2019
Blood Red Skies: British – RAF Expansion Pack	Blood Red Skies	Designer	2019
Blood Red Skies: German Ace Pilot – "Bombo" Schenck	Blood Red Skies	Designer	2019
Blood Red Skies: German Ace Pilot – "Pips" Priller	Blood Red Skies	Designer	2019
Blood Red Skies: German Ace Pilot – Eduard Tratt	Blood Red Skies	Designer	2019
Blood Red Skies: German – Bf 110 Squadron	Blood Red Skies	Designer	2019
Blood Red Skies: German – Fw 190 Squadron	Blood Red Skies	Designer	2019
Blood Red Skies: German – Junkers Ju 87D Stuka Squadron	Blood Red Skies	Designer	2019
Blood Red Skies: German – Luftwaffe Expansion Pack	Blood Red Skies	Designer	2019
Blood Red Skies: German – Messerschmitt Me 410 Squadron	Blood Red Skies	Designer	2019
Heroes of Might and Magic: Battles	Heroes of Might and Magic: Battles	Designer	2025

=== Novels and Short Stories ===
Title	Series/Setting	Date	ISBN
Survival Instinct (Necromunda)	Necromunda	24 May 2005	978-1844161881
Midnight on the Street of Knives (Dark Eldar Novella)	Path of the Dark Eldar	June 2011	
Path of the Renegade (Dark Eldar Book 1)	Path of the Dark Eldar	28 February 2012	978-1849701372
The Treasures of Biel-Tanigh (Dark Eldar Novella)	Path of the Dark Eldar	4 February 2013	
Bellathonis and the Shadow King (Dark Eldar Novella)	Path of the Dark Eldar	11 February 2013	
The Masque of Vyle (Harlequins Novella)	Path of the Dark Eldar	22 February 2013	
Path of the Incubus (Dark Eldar Book 2)	Path of the Dark Eldar	26 February 2013	978-1849703000
The Alien Hunters (Deathwatch Novella)	Deathwatch: Xenos Hunters	17 March 2014	
Path of the Archon (Dark Eldar Book 3)	Path of the Dark Eldar	25 March 2014	978-1849705912
Path of the Dark Eldar (Dark Eldar Omnibus)	Path of the Dark Eldar	17 March 2015	978-1849708357
The Arkunasha War (Tau Empire Novella)	Tau Empire	4 September 2015	
Deus Ex Mechanicus (Adeptus Mechanicus Novella)	Adeptus Mechanicus	23 April 2018 (first printed Sep 2000 in Inferno! #20)	

=== Role Playing Games ===
Title	Game	Credits	Date	ISBN
Rites of Battle	Deathwatch	Designer	2011	978-1589947818
Mark of the Xenos	Deathwatch	Designer	2011	978-1589947825
Black Crusade Core Rulebook	Black Crusade	Designer	2011	978-1616611439
Battlefleet Koronus	Rogue Trader	Designer	2011	978-1589947993
The Lathe Worlds	Dark Heresy (1st Edition)	Designer	2012	978-1589947689
Accursed	Savage Worlds	Designer	2013	978-0991343607
Accursed Player's Guide	Savage Worlds	Designer	2013	

=== Video games ===
Title	Game	Credits	Date
StarCraft II: Wings of Liberty	StarCraft II: Wings of Liberty	Lead Story Writer	July 2010

=== Magazines ===
Title	Publication	Credits	Date
White Dwarf (Issue 124)	White Dwarf Magazine	Author	April 1990
White Dwarf (Issue 127)	White Dwarf Magazine	Author	July 1990
White Dwarf (Issue 134)	White Dwarf Magazine	Author	February 1991
White Dwarf (Issue 136)	White Dwarf Magazine	Author	April 1991
White Dwarf (Issue 137)	White Dwarf Magazine	Author	May 1991
White Dwarf (Issue 145)	White Dwarf Magazine	Author	January 1992
White Dwarf (Issue 151)	White Dwarf Magazine	Author	July 1992
"Eldar Revenant Scout Titans"	White Dwarf Magazine, Issue 186	Author	June 1995
"Vindicare Imperial Assassin"	White Dwarf Magazine, Issue 189	Author	September 1995
"Evolved to Destroy"	White Dwarf Magazine, Issue 192	Author	December 1995
Game Trade Magazine (Issue 194)	Game Trade Magazine	Author	April 2016
