= Rogue trader (disambiguation) =

A rogue trader is person who makes financial trades in an unauthorised manner.

Rogue trader may also refer to:

- Rogue Trader (book), the autobiography of (and later a movie about) Nick Leeson, the man who caused the collapse of Barings Bank
- Rogue Trader (film), the 1999 film about Nick Leeson directed by James Dearden

== Warhammer 40,000 ==
- Warhammer 40,000: Rogue Trader, a rule book for the Warhammer 40,000 wargame
- Rogue Trader (role-playing game), a 2009 tabletop role-playing game based on the Warhammer 40,000 franchise
- Warhammer 40,000: Rogue Trader (video game), a 2023 computer role-playing game based on the Warhammer 40,000 franchise

== See also ==
- Rogue Traders, an Australian electronic rock group
- Rogue Traders (TV programme), a BBC consumer affairs television programme
