= Warhammer 40,000: Regicide =

- Developer: Hammerfall Publishing
- Publisher: Hammerfall Publishing
- Writer: Ross Watson
- Platforms: Microsoft Windows, iOS, Android
- Release: Microsoft Windows: WW: September 8, 2015; iOS: WW: May 19, 2016; Android: WW: July 13, 2016
- Genre: Strategy
- Modes: Single-player, multiplayer

Warhammer 40,000: Regicide is a turn-based strategy chess-like video game developed by Hammerfall Publishing for Microsoft Windows, iOS and Android, set in Games Workshop's Warhammer 40,000 universe. The game was released in an early-access form via Steam on May 5, 2015. The game was fully released on September 8, 2015.

== Gameplay ==
Players are able to log into a single game account and resume play, or use multiplayer services on different devices without the need for separate profiles. Gameplay involves two Battle Modes - Regicide and Classic. Two factions - the Space Marine Blood Angels Chapter and the Orks are available. A campaign mode featuring the Blood Angels chapter of Space Marines is included. A White Scars Space Marine army content was available for players who create their game account before the title was launched.

=== Battle modes ===
The game has two playable modes, Regicide and Classic - both available as single-player and multiplayer.

Regicide

The Regicide mode is described as "a new take on one of the most established strategy games of all time, evoking the grim setting of the iconic Warhammer 40,000 universe and hearkening to the roots of traditional gaming". Killing the 'King' will not always be the objective.

Taking on chess's concept of the 8×8 board and pieces such as the King or Rook, Regicide mode will involve two factions fighting against each other and two phases of combat where each player will plan and execute his attack through a plethora of abilities and equipment that will differ with each unit. On default, the player is granted 3 initiative points each phase which they can spend, in that turn, on the abilities and equipment available to the specific friendly piece they are moving, as well as Player abilities. The number of initiative points can be boosted with some abilities.

Classic

The Classic Battle Mode will be based on the traditional chess rules and will involve selecting a faction and battling it out online or offline against opponents the same way chess works.

=== Factions ===
Each player assumes a different faction and fights against each other in one of two battle modes available both for single-player and multiplayer. The two announced factions are the Blood Angels Chapter of the Space Marines and the Orks - each will have units, acting as specific chess pieces, that fit with the faction. While units have been generalized with specific piece names (for example Space Marine Terminator being a Rook), with the abilities and equipment it will receive in the Regicide battle mode, it will not necessarily have the same rules as a Rook.

Space Marines

The Space Marine faction is represented by the red-armoured Blood Angels Chapter. The Space Marine Captain assumes the role of the 'King' in chess. The longer he stays alive the more hardened his remaining force becomes, and can call in bombardments. The Librarian assumes the role of the 'Queen' in chess. Being a Psyker, he can drain the life-force from foes, and shatter the minds of weakened enemies. The Terminator assumes the role of the 'Rook' in chess. Assault Marine assumes the role of the 'Knight', and comes with a jet pack. The Devastator assumes the role of the 'Bishop', and being equipped with a heavy bolter. The Tactical Marines functions in the role of the 'Pawn'.

Orks

The Orks are the enemies in the single-player Blood Angels Campaign. The Ork Warboss assumes the role of the 'King'. The Weirdboy assumes the role of the 'Queen'. A living conduit of psychic energy, the Weirdboy is able to teleport across the field and blast the foe with bolts of emerald fury. Some might are able to transform an opponent into a 'squiggly beast'. The Meganobz assume the role of the 'Rook'. The Stormboyz assuming the role of the 'Knight'. The Ork Loota serves the role of the 'Bishop'. Equipped with Deffguns, they will have superior Weapon Strength and a couple of unique abilities. They are very tough, like all Orks, so scoring critical hits against them is unlikely. Their abilities include 'Ready fer Stompin!' which can be used to cause them to become more dangerous and frenzied when they sustain injury, 'Pin 'em Down' that suppresses enemies and holds them in place, and 'Take Aim' that gives them increased firepower but at the cost of their mobility. Shoota Boyz assume the role of the 'Pawn'.

== Development and release ==
In May 2015, the developer released a video showing development.

In early February 2015, Hammerfall Publishing has started selling limited edition game bundles. There is a large range of bundles - from the budget 'Neophyte'/'Slugga' pack that offers in-development access to the game as well as a Space Marine/ Ork themed T-shirt depending on choice of faction, to the large 'Terminator'/'Warboss' bundle that on top of the game access and themed T-shirt, comes with a hooded jumper with artwork similar to the T-shirt two posters - one for the Space Marine Captain unit in the game, and the Weirdboy unit - special certificate, collector's edition forum access, content season pass, exclusive forum Honour and the buyer's name in the game credits.

On October 14, 2022, Warhammer 40,000: Regicide was discontinued by Hammerfall Publishing, including the shutdown of its servers and its de-listing from the Steam, Apple, and Google Play stores, after seven years since release. However, the game's offline mode still works for previous installations.

== Reception ==
Reception

Aggregate score
Aggregator	Score
Metacritic	72/100

Review scores
Publication	Score
Hardcore Gamer	3.5/5
PC Gamer (US)	70/100
Shacknews	7/10

Warhammer 40,000: Regicide received "mixed or average" reviews according to review aggregator Metacritic.

PC Gamer awarded the game a score of 70% and called it "...a cute chess set for 40K fans and an unusual twist on the classic game." Shacknews praised the Warhammer 40,000 chess pieces, challenging puzzles, creative blend of chess and tactics, and voice acting, but criticized the luck-dependent gameplay, lack of animation variety, and slow progression system.
