= Warhammer 40,000: Rogue Trader =

1987 miniature wargame rule book

Warhammer 40,000
Rogue Trader
- Rogue Trader - the first edition of Warhammer 40,000
- Designers: Rick Priestley, Andy Chambers, and others
- Publishers: Games Workshop
- Years active: 1987-1993
- Chance: Dice rolling
- Skills: Strategy, Arithmetic

Warhammer 40,000: Rogue Trader is the first edition rule/source book for the Warhammer 40,000 miniature wargame by Games Workshop. The subtitle "Rogue Trader" was dropped in subsequent editions.

== Rule book ==
The existence of a science fiction table top game in development by Games Workshop was made known through Citadel Journal in 1986 and Rogue Trader was officially released at Games Workshop's annual Games Day event in October 1987. Created by Rick Priestley, The game was titled Warhammer 40,000 in order to clearly differentiate it from 2000 AD's Rogue Trooper comic series. The game featured rules that were closely modelled on those of its older fantasy counterpart, Warhammer Fantasy Battle. The majority of the book was written by Rick Priestley who was also responsible for WFB.

The gameplay of Warhammer 40,000: Rogue Trader differs from its main modern-day descendant, in that it was heavily role-play-oriented, with great detail placed on weaponry and vehicles and the inclusion of a third player (the Game Master) in battles, a role similar to the Dungeon Master in Dungeons & Dragons. Rogue Trader introduced some races that were later removed from the setting, such as the Space Slann (a humanoid frog-like race also found in Warhammer Fantasy at the time).

Models which were released for Rogue Trader are no longer produced. Limited sales have taken place through the Games Workshop online store.

Like many later incarnations, the Rogue Trader rulebook mostly contained lore about the Warhammer 40,000 universe, including the historical background of the Imperium of Mankind and xenos (alien) races. Information on the Warp was limited and the forces of Chaos were nowhere in the text. They were, however, referred to by game designer Rick Priestley in the pre-release announcement, and did show up shortly after in expansion rule books which provided not just greater background for the various races and armies, but also the first proper army lists.

== Lore Expansions ==
Supplemental material was continually published in White Dwarf magazine, which provided rules for new units and models. These articles were from time to time released in expansion books along with new rules, background materials and illustrations. Ten books were released for the original edition of Warhammer 40,000:

Chapter Approved - Book of the Astronomican, the Warhammer 40,000 Compendium and the Warhammer 40,000 Compilation compiled articles previously printed in White Dwarf.

Waaargh - Orks, 'Ere We Go - Orks in Warhammer 40,000 and Freebooterz introduced background material for Ork culture and physiology, and army lists for the major Ork clans, pirates, and mercenaries.

The Realm of Chaos books, Slaves to Darkness and The Lost and the Damned, included background and rules for Chaos in all of GW's main systems of the era - Rogue Trader, Warhammer Fantasy Battle 3rd edition, and Warhammer Fantasy Roleplay.

The Battle Manual consolidated rules for the many weapons of the 41st millennium, and introduced new rules replacing the shooting and hand-to-hand combat phases of the game, while the Vehicle Manual contained a new system for vehicle management, including a target location system which used acetate crosshairs to simulate weapon hits on a silhouette of the vehicle.

Together, these manuals practically form an intermediate edition of the Warhammer 40,000 rules, between Rogue Trader and 2nd edition.

== Character class ==
The rule book for this role-playing game originally described Rogue Traders as being freelance explorers employed by the Imperium to search for planets outside of the established borders. A Rogue Trader is portrayed as a trusted Imperial servant, and therefore given a ship, a crew, a contingent of marines and the right to go wherever they so desire. They generally survey uninhabited worlds near to the fringes of Imperial space and on the Eastern Fringes where the Astronomican does not reach.

The potentials of new worlds, such as material wealth or knowledge, has stimulated the growth of the Rogue Trader section of society. Some have even gone so far as to try to cross intergalactic space, although even a mighty psyker is not powerful enough to send back reports from that distance. When encountering new alien species, the Rogue Trader is very much a separate organisation from the Imperium, so they must decide how to react to these new creatures. If they judge them unworthy, they can be destroyed or they can gather information on them and have someone else destroy them. If they deem them useful, they may make contact with them. If they are only useful for their technology or material wealth then they may be raided, the trader returning to Terra laden with rich goods and undreamt of technology.

A Rogue Trader can be in charge of up to a dozen ships, including many transports with willing colonists and troops. They tend to be individuals who have reached a certain height in the Imperium but for some reason are not considered fit for further advancement. By being offered Rogue Trader status, they can be put somewhere out of harm's reach, though it strengthens their reputation as outcasts. They can include overzealous Space Marine Commanders, powerful navigators and even Inquisitors.

This profile has been altered as the game (and Warhammer 40,000 universe) evolved. For example, in many of the more recent Warhammer 40,000 novels, many Rogue Traders have been depicted as independent traders who tend to smuggle highly illegal or dangerous contraband by running Imperial blockades. Some of these items include, but are not limited to, narcotics, alien technology, and warp-tainted items. However, some Rogue Traders are more sympathetic to the Imperium, and many Imperial agents such as Inquisitors employ Rogue Traders when they require fast and stealthy transportation.

Yet more recent canon depicts the Rogue Traders as an amalgam of the two previous versions. Rogue Traders are given a writ from the Imperium, much like privateers, to explore beyond the boundaries of Imperial Space. This writ passes to the Trader's descendants. The Rogue Trader and their family, and the vessels they command, which can comprise a small fleet in some cases, are exempt from many Imperial laws and regulations, but is still under Imperial scrutiny. Rogue traders that dabble too heavily in alien trade, or other "heretical" practices, could still be investigated and executed by the Inquisition.

== Spin-offs ==
In 2009, Fantasy Flight Games released Rogue Trader, a role-playing game based on Warhammer 40,000: Rogue Trader. In this RPG, the players specifically play the roles of a rogue trader and their retinue, whereas in Warhammer 40,000: Rogue Trader, this was merely a recommended option. A rogue trader is a human who has been licensed by the Imperium to travel freely across the galaxy and trade with aliens.

Owlcat Games released a CRPG with the same title and based on the Warhammer 40,000 universe in 2023.

== Reception ==
In the September 1989 edition of Dragon (Issue 149), Ken Rolston liked the setting of this game, pointing out that it "has more in common with fantasy role-playing than with most other science-fiction games. Sure, there are spaceships, lasers, and plasma guns, but in WH40K these marvels are treated more like fantasy magical devices than like plausible developments of modern technology." Rolston then wrote a lengthy article showing how this miniatures game could be converted to a role-playing system. He thought the mixture of sf and fantasy lent itself to role-playing, saying, "this choice of a future-fantasy theme has two appealing features as a role-playing setting. First, a future fantasy frees the game master (GM) from the challenging task of moderating and maintaining a plausible science-fictional universe... [and] you can borrow liberally from the trappings and conventions of two popular adventure genres — medieval fantasy and science fiction — to create a fantasy campaign with its own peculiar and distinctive flavor."

In a retrospective review written 22 years after the game's release, Robey Jenkins noted "Games Workshop had existed for almost a decade before Rogue Trader was released and their flagship game at the time, Warhammer Fantasy Battles, had already made their name in the insular wargaming community of the time. But it was Rogue Trader and everything that followed its release that secured GW's future as the behemoth of tabletop miniatures wargaming."

== Other reviews ==
- Challenge #35 (1988)

== Bibliography ==
- Warhammer 40,000: Rogue Trader, Rick Priestley, Berkley Publishing Group, London 1989, ISBN 1-869893-23-9
- Priestley, Rick (September 1987). "Warhammer 40,000: Games Workshop's Latest Tabletop Game - Hail the Emperor!". White Dwarf. 93. Nottingham, UK: Games Workshop: 33–44.
- Priestley, Rick (October 1987). "Warhammer 40,000 Rogue Trader". White Dwarf. 94. Nottingham, UK: Games Workshop: 2–3.
- Chamber, Andy (October 1986). "Warhammer 40,000 Rogue Trader". Warhammer 40,000 Roleplay. 171. Nottingham, UK: Black Library: 2–3.
