= Grimdark Future =

Tabletop game

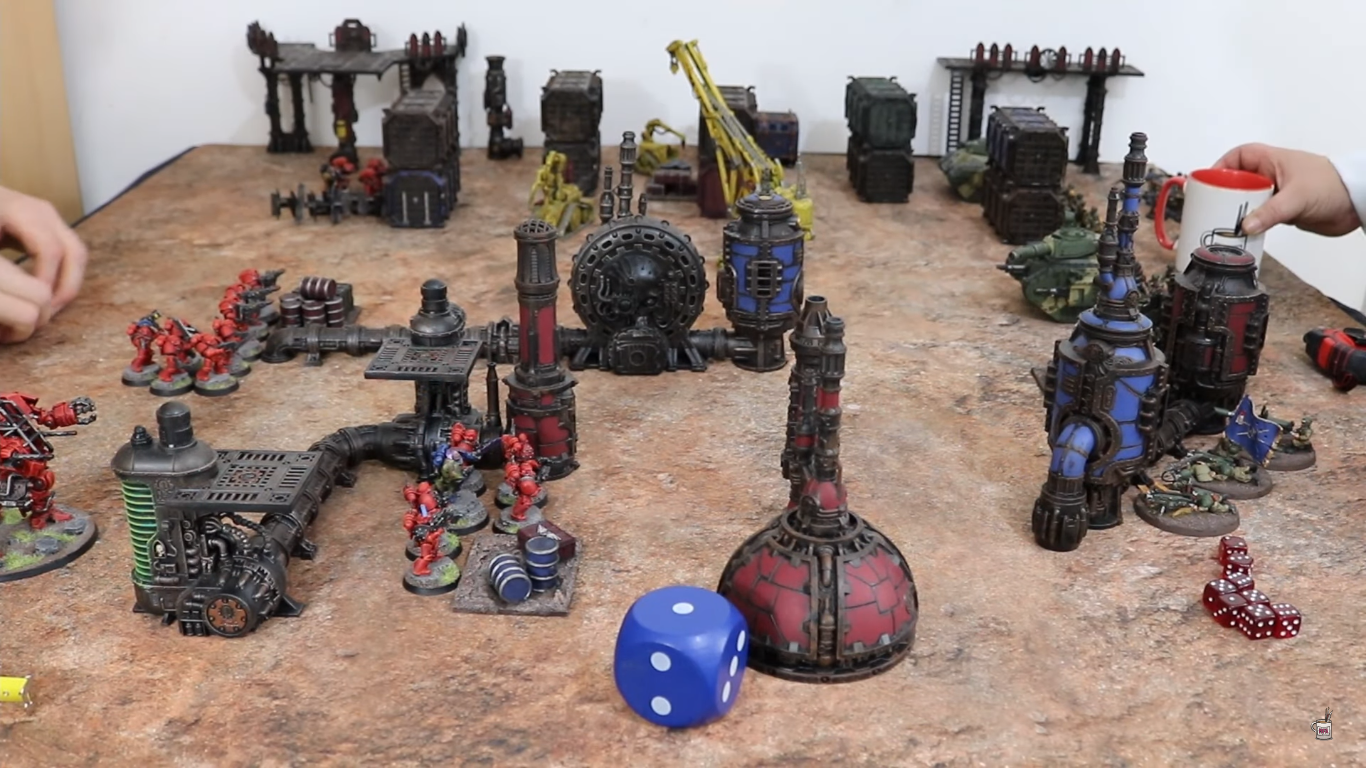
- A game of Grimdark Future
- Manufacturers: One Page Rules
- Players: 1-2
- Website: www.onepagerules.com/games/grimdark-future

Grimdark Future is a free to play tabletop miniature wargame created by One Page Rules. It is inspired by Warhammer 40,000 by Games Workshop, but designed to have simplified rules for increased ease and speed of gameplay.

== Gameplay ==
Grimdark Future uses miniature models for gameplay. These models may come from other companies (such as Games Workshop) or they may printed as 3D models or 2D images on paper from files purchased from One Page Rules. The game's rules also contain small paper tokens that may be used in place of models.

The game's basic rulebook is 16 pages long. Unlike Warhammer 40,000, Grimdark Future does not have movement or activation phases, instead opting for alternate activation. Dice are used, and games are objective-driven. Games are divided into four rounds, with each round taking roughly 20 minutes to play. The game has 28 playable armies, most of which are analogous to factions within Warhammer 40,000. Grimdark Future's website contains all of the official factions, however users are encouraged to create their own factions and rules which are balanced by the formulas that Grimdark Future uses.

== Reception ==
One Page Rules has been praised for its ease of gameplay, and has been called "perfect for casual gaming". It has also been praised for its accessibility and low cost to play. In addition, the gameplay system has been described as "elegant and efficient".

Despite this, the game has been criticized as overly derivative of Warhammer 40,000 in terms of aesthetics, with one reviewer describing it as a "store brand version".
