= Warhammer 40,000 Roleplay =

Science fiction tabletop role-playing game

- Publishers: Black Industries (2008); Fantasy Flight Games (2008-2016); Ulisses Spiele (2016-2017); Cubicle 7 (2017-present)
- Publication: 25 January 2008
- Genres: Gothic science fantasy

Warhammer 40,000 Roleplay is a role-playing game system with multiple source books set within the Warhammer 40,000 universe. The first game using the system, Dark Heresy, was created by Black Industries, which closed soon after the initial release. Official support by Fantasy Flight Games was discontinued in September 2016. The license was later acquired by Ulisses Spiele, who published a new game, Wrath & Glory, in 2018. In 2019, responsibility for Wrath & Glory was transferred to Cubicle 7, which continued support for the Wrath & Glory, re-released the old Fantasy Flight games as digital-only and later published Imperium Maledictum.

For Fantasy Flight developed material, the Warhammer 40,000 Roleplay system is explained and used with small differences in a series of five independently playable games. Each has a different, narrow focus and multiple supporting books of its own:

- In Dark Heresy (2008), the player characters are agents of the Inquisition.
- In Rogue Trader (2009), the player characters are important members of ship crews in interstellar trade and exploration, often encountering xenos.
- Deathwatch (2010), has a martial focus. The player characters are loyalist Space Marines.
- Black Crusade (2011), has a martial focus. The player characters are followers of Chaos (not necessarily soldiers), or Chaos Space Marines.
- Only War (2012), has a martial focus. The player characters are Imperial Guardsmen.

When the Warhammer 40,000 Roleplay license was transitioned to Ulisses, the system was re-designed. The first campaign under the new developer is Wrath & Glory, which allows player characters of many different races and backgrounds, and implements a card deck system that is used alongside traditional dice rolling.

Imperium Maledictum, released by Cubicle 7 in 2023, is a spiritual successor to Dark Heresy, using a similar system and with emphasis on investigation, intrigue, and survival. However, player characters serve many different Imperial institutions ("Patrons") instead of exclusively the Inquisition.

== Gameplay ==
In Dark Heresy, the players assume the roles of Acolytes working for an Inquisitor, who sends them on various missions. Depending on the type of mission, gameplay can involve investigation, combat, intrigue, or other genres. The Game Master is able to tailor their campaign to suit their player group through this flexibility. Since the players work for an Inquisitor, most missions involve rooting out heresies or matters relating to them. The game allows for many other missions, including wiping out dangerous gangs, gathering evidence of corruption, dealing with alien threats or eliminating rogue psykers.

In Rogue Trader, players take the role of a Rogue Trader and their crew as they operate outside the stellar and legal boundaries of the Imperium of Man (Imperium). The book provides, among other things, rules for interplanetary commerce and spaceship operation, travel, combat, and customization.

In Deathwatch, players take the role of surgically modified super humans known as Space Marines. These individuals are recruited from their native Chapters (fighting units of approximately 1,000 people) to serve as a military arm of the Inquisition, against particularly dangerous heretics known as Chaos worshipers and alien lifeforms known as Xenos.

In Black Crusade, players take the role of Chaos-corrupted characters. Black Crusade, essentially, is the corrupted version of previously mentioned Warhammer 40,000 roleplaying games. Characters are cast in the role of the villain, with the players actively working against the Imperium and for the forces of Chaos in the sector.

In Only War, each player takes the role of an Imperial Guardsman, one of the billions of hardened conscripts constantly fighting on myriad fronts at the whim of the Earth-based government of the Imperium (Adeptus Terra).

Black Industries chose to set Dark Heresy in a previously unknown sector of the game's fantasy universe, the Calixis Sector, within the Segmentum Obscurus. This sector lies adjacent to Scarus Sector, which is the setting of Dan Abnett's Eisenhorn trilogy. Calixis is similarly adjacent to the Koronus Expanse, the setting of Rogue Trader, and to the warzone on the edge of the Periphery Sub-Sector, the setting of Only War.

== System ==
The Warhammer 40,000 role playing system uses 10-sided dice (d10) exclusively; all information is generated either through a single die roll with numbers one through ten or as a percentage with two 10 sided dice rolled together, one designated as the tens digit and the other a single digit.

Characters are created with 9 statistics;

- Weapon Skill (WS): Hand-to-hand and melee proficiency.
- Ballistic Skill (BS): Governs all projectile and ranged attacks.
- Strength (S): Physical strength of a character.
- Toughness (T): Resistance to physical punishment.
- Agility (Ag): Governs how quickly an individual can move as well as how well they can dodge.
- Intelligence (Int): Used to work technology and understand languages and writings.
- Perception (Per): How quickly you notice things and in how much detail.
- Will Power (WP): Your resistance to horrors and used to manifest psychic abilities.
- Fellowship (Fel): Used for interaction with other people.

Each attribute ranges from 1 to 100. Very high (above 70) and very low (below 10) scores are extremely unlikely within the game system and utilizing currently published rules. The system scores indicate that your average human is in the 30s range for their abilities and variations will indicate if they are particularly well suited for a task or if it is one of their weaker areas. Game mechanics also introduce a wide variety of special rules that provide bonuses and reductions in certain areas (For example, a character from a hive world has a higher Fellowship, but a lower Toughness.)

All actions, like making an attack roll or using a skill, uses the following basic mechanic:

- Roll percentile dice
- Add bonuses or penalties associated with the action
- Compare the result to the appropriate characteristic; equal to or lower indicates success; greater than the characteristic indicates failure.

With some character actions the amount by which the character succeeds or fails can add degrees of success for spectacular results. When using degrees of success the GM details the result.

== Career Paths ==
In Dark Heresy, each player picks a career path for their character, which is similar to a class from other RPG systems such as Dungeons & Dragons. There are eight career paths in the core rulebook, and more added in several source books.

In Rogue Trader, one player typically takes the Rogue Trader career path, representing a ship captain who has been granted a warrant to explore and trade outside the limits of the Imperium of Man. The other players act as members of their crew.

In Deathwatch, Space Marines are divided into groups based upon their individual abilities. In most campaigns the Squad Leader is either chosen by one of the players or is an NPC controlled by the GM.

In Only War, careers are divided to Guardsmen and Support Specialists. Support Specialists are elite members of Imperial Guard that serve beside regular Guardsmen.

- Heavy Gunner – Big, strong, and tough, these Guardsmen wield any heavy weapons that are given to the Squad.
- Medic – Dodging deadly weapons-fire and explosions, these Guardsmen risk everything to keep their squad-mates alive.
- Operator – A bit less leery of the strange technology that the Imperial Guard often employs than their compatriots, these Guardsmen are often entrusted with piloting the Squad's transport or other vehicles.
- Sergeant – Every Squad needs a strong commander to lead the charge into combat. The Sergeant keeps their soldiers motivated and coordinated through the toughest battles.
- Weapon Specialist – The "average" Guardsman, these individuals perfect the use of the lasgun or other weapons, bringing death to the enemies of the Imperium.
- Commissar – These soldiers enforce morale over the rank-and-file troops with an iron fist and the occasional summary execution.
- Ministorum Priest – Bringing the light of the God-Emperor to the battlefield, Ministorum Priests inspire the troops around them, not just with their preaching, but by fighting their foes with their massive Eviscerator chainswords.
- Ogryn – These immense Abhumans tend to be a bit dimwitted, but act as some of the Imperial Guard's most effective shock troops.
- Ratling – Short and rotund, these small abhumans are used as infiltrators and snipers.
- Sanctioned Psyker – Feared by their enemies and allies alike, the Psykers of the Imperium are capable of bending the roiling power of the Warp to their will – until that power breaks them.
- Storm Trooper – These elite soldiers are trained alongside the Commissars in the Schola Progenium. Equipped with some of the best armour and weapons in the Imperium, they are deadly fighters.
- Tech-priest Enginseer – Enginseers wade into battle clad in thick armour, tending to the machine spirits of the Imperial Guard's many war machines.

To advance in their career path, a player character earns experience points (XP) and spends them to gain skills and talents or improve their characteristics. The skills and talents available depend on the Career and the level – or rank – within that path. Once a character has spent the requisite amount of XP, he advances to the next rank of the career, which unlocks new skills and talents for purchase. Each career path also has several options for certain ranks, each path specializing in a different branch of the career. Skills cost 100 XP, 200 XP, or 300 XP to purchase, with more powerful or unusual skills having higher costs. The core rulebook recommends players receive 200 XP for every four hours of play, so players can usually purchase a new skill or two after each session.

== Products ==
- Only War – Core Rulebook, including a pre-written adventure (ISBN 978-1616614690)
  - The Game Master's Kit – A game master's screen for Only War and a booklet that includes a pre-written adventure and additional NPCs
  - Final Testament – An adventure in three parts for Only War
  - No Surrender – An adventure in three parts for Only War
  - Hammer of the Emperor – A supplement that focuses on the Spinward Front's conflicts and its participants
  - Enemies of the Imperium – A supplement that gives deeper insight into the deadly foes of the Imperial Guard who lurk in the Spinward Front
  - Shield of Humanity – A supplement that focuses on support specialists.

== Development ==
Black Industries, the role-playing game imprint of BL Publishing, which is itself a part of Games Workshop, initially farmed out the development of Warhammer 40,000 Roleplay to Green Ronin, the same company that created the 2nd edition of Warhammer Fantasy Roleplay (WHFRP2), before bringing development back in house. Fantasy Flight Games took over development of future products after acquiring the license for the game in 2008.

A collector's edition of Dark Heresy – the first release of the game – went on sale on Monday, 10 December 2007, at 16:00 GMT. The 200 copies of the game, individually numbered with an accompanying 'signature' of an in-game Inquisitor, sold out in six minutes. The regular edition was released on 25 January 2008, and a demo booklet was distributed at Gen Con 2007. The game itself shares many design features with WHFRP2.

On 28 January 2008, Games Workshop announced that it would close Black Industries, thereby discontinuing Dark Heresy and all the other games published by the subsidiary, to allow them to focus on the commercial success of their novels and core business.

On 22 February 2008, Black Industries announced that all Warhammer Fantasy and Warhammer 40,000 RPG, CCG, and select board game rights were being transferred to Fantasy Flight Games, who would continue to publish Dark Heresy.

During late 2008 and 2009, Fantasy Flight started releasing autonomously-developed material for the Dark Heresy game: a collection of heretical factions to pit the player characters against titled Disciples of the Dark Gods, a monster manual called Creatures Anathema, and a mini-campaign in three parts dubbed The Haarlock Legacy.

Fantasy Flight also announced a manual on "radical" inquisitors (covering the most extreme factions, their tactics, equipment, and most prominent figures) and a major expansion allowing players to take their characters to the rank of interrogator, bestowed with an inquisitorial rosette, enjoying augmented prestige and able to summon more powerful allies.

On 20 February 2009, Fantasy Flight Games announced Rogue Trader, an addition to the WH40K roleplaying milieu. The initial limited release sold out at the Gen Con 2009 event before a wider release to stores in October 2009.

Deathwatch, the third Fantasy Flight RPG based in the Warhammer 40,000 universe was officially announced on 26 February 2010.
