= Deathwatch (role-playing game) =

Tabletop role-playing game

- Publishers: Fantasy Flight Games (2010-2017); Games Workshop; Cubicle 7 (2017-present)
- Publication: 2010
- Genres: Science Fantasy; Military science fiction

Deathwatch is a role-playing game published in 2010 by Fantasy Flight Games, that is set in the Warhammer 40,000 universe and uses the Warhammer 40,000 Roleplay system.

== Description ==
The player characters in Deathwatch are loyalist Space Marines, surgically and biologically enhanced super soldiers. The game has a martial focus, as opposed to complex intrigue or detailed representation of a setting.

=== Gameplay ===
In Deathwatch the players take the role of Space Marines as they perform various combat missions. These individuals are recruited from their native Chapters (fighting units of approximately 1,000 men that are broadly inspired by medieval knightly orders) to serve in squads as part of the eponymous Deathwatch, a military arm of the Inquisition, which is a vast organization composed of religious zealots with far-reaching authority, inspired by portrayals of the real-life Spanish inqusition and similar religious authorities. The role of the Deathwatch is to fight against particularly dangerous heretics and alien lifeforms.

=== Career paths ===
In Deathwatch, Space Marines are divided into groups based upon their individual abilities. In most campaigns the Squad Leader is either chosen by one of the players or is an NPC controlled by the GM.

- Apothecary - Combat medic of Space Marine forces, equipped for fighting primarily in close combat, tasked with first aid, and also with recovering the material necessary for the creation of more super soldiers from the bodies of fallen Space Marines.
- Assault Marine - Close combat expert usually equipped with a jump pack, close-range and melee weapons.
- Devastator Marine - Heavy weapons expert. Normally armed with a weapon like a lascannon or heavy bolter.
- Librarian - Space Marine psyker, a specialist with mental powers that function similarly to magic in a fantasy universe. These powers are grouped into areas such as divination, pyromancy or telepathy and Librarians from some Chapters can also have access to unique powers.
- Tactical Marine - Veteran Space Marine, who is typically in charge of the squad. Has the potential to hone his squad leadership abilities.
- Techmarine - Space Marine who learned technological knowledge from the Adeptus Mechanicus and is thus trained in using rare weapons and speciality equipment. The Techmarine is also responsible for maintaining all equipment within the Deathwatch, including Dreadnoughts, powered armour, Terminator armour, and weapons.

== Products ==
- Deathwatch - Core Rulebook, including a pre-written adventure (ISBN 978-1589947788)
  - The Game Master's Kit - A game master's screen for Deathwatch and a booklet that includes a pre-written adventure, and additional NPCs and antagonists
  - The Emperor Protects - An adventure anthology containing three adventures
  - Rites of Battle - A sourcebook including new character options, advanced specialties such as the Chaplain, Chapter creation rules, weapons, armour and vehicle rules
  - Mark of the Xenos - A sourcebook of aliens, heretics, and daemons for use as foes
  - The Achilus Assault - A sourcebook covering the details of the Jericho Reach sector of the galaxy, the default setting for the Deathwatch RPG. The book provides extensive information for any Warhammer 40,000 RPG campaign, leaning toward covering Deathwatch aspects.
  - First Founding - A sourcebook that adds the four remaining First Founding chapters not included in previous Deathwatch books. This book also includes new specialties, and rules for Deathwatch Space Marines operating solo, without a squad, or conversely, alongside followers.
  - The Jericho Reach - A supplement that provides information on the Jericho Reach, includes a full adventure
  - Rising Tempest An adventure module in three parts
  - Honour the Chapter - A supplement that provides information and character creation options for Chapters from the Second and subsequent Foundings
  - The Outer Reach - A supplement detailing the Dead Cabal and Necrons of the Suhbekhar dynasty
  - Ark of Lost Souls - A supplement that provides rules for Space Hulks, includes an adventure set on board an infamous Space Hulk
  - Emperor's Chosen - A supplement that focuses on Deathwatch veterans.

== Development ==
Deathwatch, the third Fantasy Flight RPG based in the Warhammer 40,000 universe was officially announced on 26 February 2010.

Shannon Appelcline commented: "Deathwatch (2010), the third Warhammer 40k, finally allowed players the opportunity to play Space Marines – Space Marines that kill and kill and kill. Mechanically the game follows the core of Warhammer 40,000 Roleplay rules, with the biggest addition being 'demeanors' – another indie-like addition to the game that allows players to get bonuses for following their character's core nature. Beyond that, characters were much more powerful than those in either of the previous games, with starting Space Marines being about the same power-level as the most powerful possible Acolytes from Dark Heresy. Some players have expressed concerns over the limited roleplay opportunities of a game so focused on killing but like the other Warhammer 40k Roleplay releases, Deathwatch appeal most to those players looking for the sort of play it allows."
