= Dark Heresy (role-playing game) =

Tabletop fantasy role-playing game

Warhammer 40,000 Roleplay
- Cover of Dark Heresy, the first book of the Warhammer 40,000 Roleplay series
- Designers: Owen Barnes, Kate Flack, Mike Mason
- Publishers: Black Industries (2008); Fantasy Flight Games (2008-2017); Cubicle 7 (2017-present)
- Publication: 25 January 2008
- Genres: Gothic science fantasy

Dark Heresy is a role-playing game published by Black Industries in 2008 that uses the Warhammer 40,000 Roleplay system. A second edition was published in 2014 under Fantasy Flight Games.

== Description ==
In Dark Heresy, the player characters are agents of the Inquisition.

=== Gameplay ===
The players assume the role of a group of Acolytes working for an Inquisitor, who sends them on various missions. Depending on the type of mission, the gameplay can involve investigation, combat, intrigue, or a number of other genres. Therefore, the Game Master can tailor their campaign to suit their player group. As the players work for an Inquisitor, most missions involve rooting out heresies or matters relating to them, but the breadth of the game allows for many other missions, including wiping out dangerous gangs, gathering evidence of corruption, dealing with alien threats or eliminating rogue psykers.

=== Career paths ===
Each player can pick a career path for their character, which is similar to a class from other RPG systems such as Dungeons & Dragons. There are 8 career paths in the core rulebook, and more added in several sourcebooks. They are:

- Adept – A career path devoted to knowledge, logic, and analysis, though they are not very effective in combat and not always good in social interaction.
- Arbitrator – Members of the Adeptus Arbites, the elite Imperial Law upholding organisation, are effective both in investigative skills and combat.
- Assassin – These skilled killers excel in both combat and stealth skills.
- Cleric – Clergy of the Ecclesiarchy train in a wide range of abilities, but excel at motivation and leadership.
- Guardsman – Although the name of this class usually brings to mind members of the Imperial Guard, it also applies to mercenaries and other soldiers; they are skilled warriors who can also operate vehicles.
- Imperial Psyker – This class represents an individual with psychic powers, able to channel the warp to accomplish a wide variety of things.
- Scum – Criminals, outcasts, thieves, and other miscreants, this class of rogues has a variety of useful skills involving stealth, infiltration and social interaction with less-honest members of Imperial society.
- Tech-Priest – Skilled with machines and technology, they are members of the Cult Mechanicus.
- Adepta Sororitas – Commonly known as the Sisters of Battle, this career path was introduced in the Inquisitor's Handbook and is recommended for veteran players due to the roleplaying challenges involved. While superficially similar to clerics, they are even more rigid in their mindset and can perform faith talents.
- Battle Sisters – This new career is added in Blood of Martyrs, it differs from the Adepta Sororitas as income has been modified and it allows characters to start with the common Sister of Battle weapons and armour.
- Grey Knight – This new career is added in Daemon Hunter, and is recommended for veteran players. It looks like a compromise variant for Dark Heresy-Deathwatch crossover.

== Products ==
- Dark Heresy – Core Rulebook, including a pre-written adventure (ISBN 978-1844164356)
  - The Game Master's Kit – A game master's screen for Dark Heresy and a 32-page booklet that includes a pre-written adventure, xenos generator, and new rules for poisons and toxins
  - Character Folio – A notebook designed to be a combined character sheet and journal
  - Inquisitor's Handbook – Supplement, introduces the Adepta Sororitas career path and new home world types as well as an expanded rule system for the original home worlds, expanded armoury, and expanded skill rules
  - Purge the Unclean – An adventure anthology containing three adventures, each focusing on a different genre or play style
  - Shattered Hope – A free preview adventure available for download on the Black Industries web site
  - Edge of Darkness – A free preview adventure by Alan Bligh (and others) available for download on the Fantasy Flight Games web site
  - Disciples of the Dark Gods – Supplement, information detailing cults and other various threats within the game setting. Includes a Full Length Adventure.
  - Creatures Anathema – Supplement, a "Bestiary of Aliens, Beasts, and Daemons" for use as enemies
  - The Radical's Handbook – Supplement, introduces means of playing Radical (Heretical) character types as well as new gear and advances.
  - Ascension – Supplement, introduces advanced career paths enabling players to become Inquisitors or Throne Agents, high-powered acolytes who bridge the power gap between Dark Heresy and Rogue Trader characters.
  - Tattered Fates: The Haarlock Legacy Volume 1 – Part 1 of a 3 part adventure campaign
  - Damned Cities: The Haarlock Legacy Volume 2 – Part 2 of a 3 part adventure campaign
  - Dead Stars: The Haarlock Legacy Volume 3 – Part 3 of a 3 part adventure campaign
  - Blood of Martyrs – Supplement, includes new rules, backgrounds, alternate careers and equipment for playing servants of the Adeptus Ministorum, the church of the Imperium
  - The Black Sepulchre: The Apostasy Gambit Volume 1 – Part 1 of a 3 part adventure campaign
  - The Church of the Damned: The Apostasy Gambit Volume 2 – Part 2 of a 3 part adventure campaign
  - The Chaos Commandment: The Apostasy Gambit Volume 3 – Part 3 of a 3 part adventure campaign
  - Daemon Hunter – Supplement, expanding on the inquisitors of Ordo Malleus and the Grey Knight chapter of Space Marines.
  - Book of Judgement – Supplement, expanding on the Adeptus Arbites and Scum of the Calixis Sector with new rules, backgrounds, alternate careers and equipment for playing servants or recidivists of the Adeptus Arbites, the federal law of the Imperium
  - The Lathe Worlds – Supplement, revealing the secret history of the Lathe Worlds, from the founding to the current struggles against tech-heresy. In the book there are alternate careers and equipment for players.
- Dark Heresy (Second Edition) – Core Rulebook, changes some of the mechanics (particularly with regard to character creation) in line with other recent FFG publications such as Only War and includes a pre-made adventure
  - The Game Master's Kit – A game master's screen for Dark Heresy Second Edition and a 32-page booklet that includes a pre-written adventure and guidance for building Nemeses to act as recurring antagonists for campaigns set in the Askellon Sector
  - Forgotten Gods – Adventure, set in the newly introduced Askellon Sector, it concerns the hunt for a xenotech cult and includes new homeworlds for player characters
  - Enemies Within – Supplement, provides more character creation and advancement options including the Adepta Sororitas and mechanics for generating heretical cults and adventures
  - Enemies Without – Supplement detailing the Ordo Xenos, with new player options, stats for aliens as both allies and enemies, expanded rules for flying vehicles and guidelines for running 'explications' – where Acolytes dissect aliens for clues.
  - Enemies Beyond – Supplement detailing the Ordo Malleus, with new character creation options, a full bestiary of daemons and rules for creating daemon weapons, binding daemon-hosts and summoning daemons.

== Development ==
A collector's edition of Dark Heresy – the first release of the game – went on sale on Monday, 10 December 2007, at 16:00 GMT. The 200 copies of the game, individually numbered with an accompanying 'signature' of an in-game Inquisitor, sold out in six minutes. The regular edition was released on 25 January 2008, and a demo booklet was distributed at Gen Con 2007.

The game itself shares many design features with WHFRP2.

On 28 January 2008, Games Workshop announced that it would close Black Industries – thereby discontinuing Dark Heresy and all the other games published by the subsidiary – to allow them to focus on the commercial success of their novels and core business.

On 22 February 2008, Black Industries announced that all Warhammer Fantasy and Warhammer 40,000 RPG, CCG, and select board game rights were being transferred to Fantasy Flight Games, who would continue to publish Dark Heresy.

During late 2008 and 2009, Fantasy Flight started releasing autonomously developed material for the Dark Heresy game: a collection of heretical factions to pit the player characters against titled Disciples of the Dark Gods, a monster manual called Creatures Anathema, and a mini-campaign in three parts dubbed The Haarlock Legacy.

Fantasy Flight also announced a manual on "radical" inquisitors (covering the most extreme factions, their tactics, equipment, and most prominent figures) and a major expansion allowing players to take their characters to the rank of interrogator, bestowed with an inquisitorial rosette, enjoying augmented prestige and able to summon more powerful allies.

On 9 September 2016 Fantasy Flight announced they would be ending their relationship with Games Workshop from 28 February 2017 for all shared products including Dark Heresy.

== Reviews ==
- Pyramid
- Rebel Times #8
