= Black Crusade (role-playing game) =

Tabletop role-playing game

- Publishers: Fantasy Flight Games (2010-2017); Cubicle 7 (2017-present)
- Publication: 2011
- Genres: Science Fantasy

Black Crusade is a role-playing game published in 2011 that uses the Warhammer 40,000 Roleplay system.

== Description ==
Black Crusade (2011) has a martial focus. The player characters are followers of Chaos (not necessarily soldiers).

=== Gameplay ===
In Black Crusade, players take the role of Chaos-corrupted characters. Black Crusade, essentially, is the corrupted version of previously published Warhammer 40,000 roleplaying games. Characters are cast in the role of the antagonist, with the players actively working against the human empire and for the forces of Chaos in the sector.

== Products ==
- Black Crusade - Core Rulebook, including a pre-written adventure (ISBN 978-1616611439)
  - The Game Master's Kit - A game master's screen for Black Crusade and a booklet that includes a pre-written adventure, additional NPCs, and expanded rules
  - Hand of Corruption - An adventure in three acts for Black Crusade
  - The Tome of Fate - A supplement that focuses on Tzeentch, the Chaos God of Change. The first of four books focusing on the Ruinous Powers
  - The Tome of Blood - A supplement that focuses on Khorne, the Lord of Skulls. The second of four books focusing on the Ruinous Powers
  - The Tome of Excess - A supplement that focuses on Slaanesh, the Prince of Pleasure. The third of four books focusing on the Ruinous Powers.
  - The Tome of Decay - A supplement that focuses on Grandfather Nurgle, the Master of Plagues. The last of four books focusing on the Ruinous Powers
