= Warhammer 40,000 =

Miniature wargame

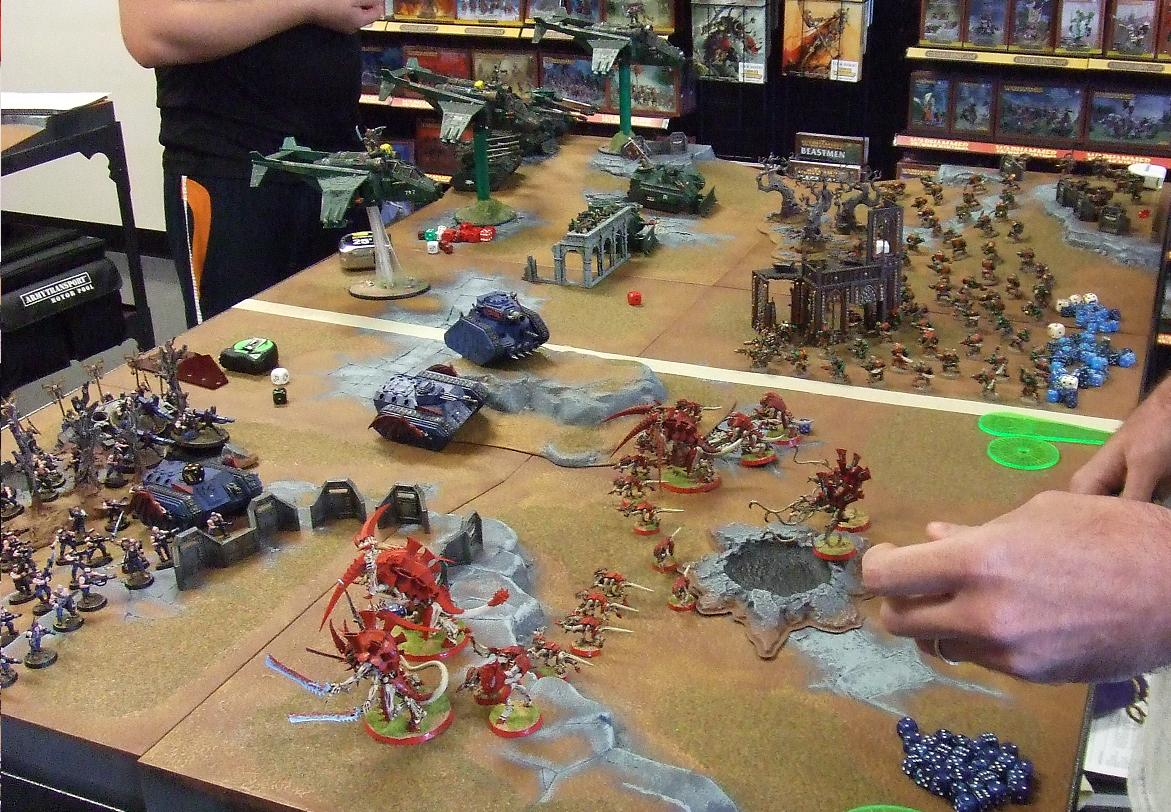
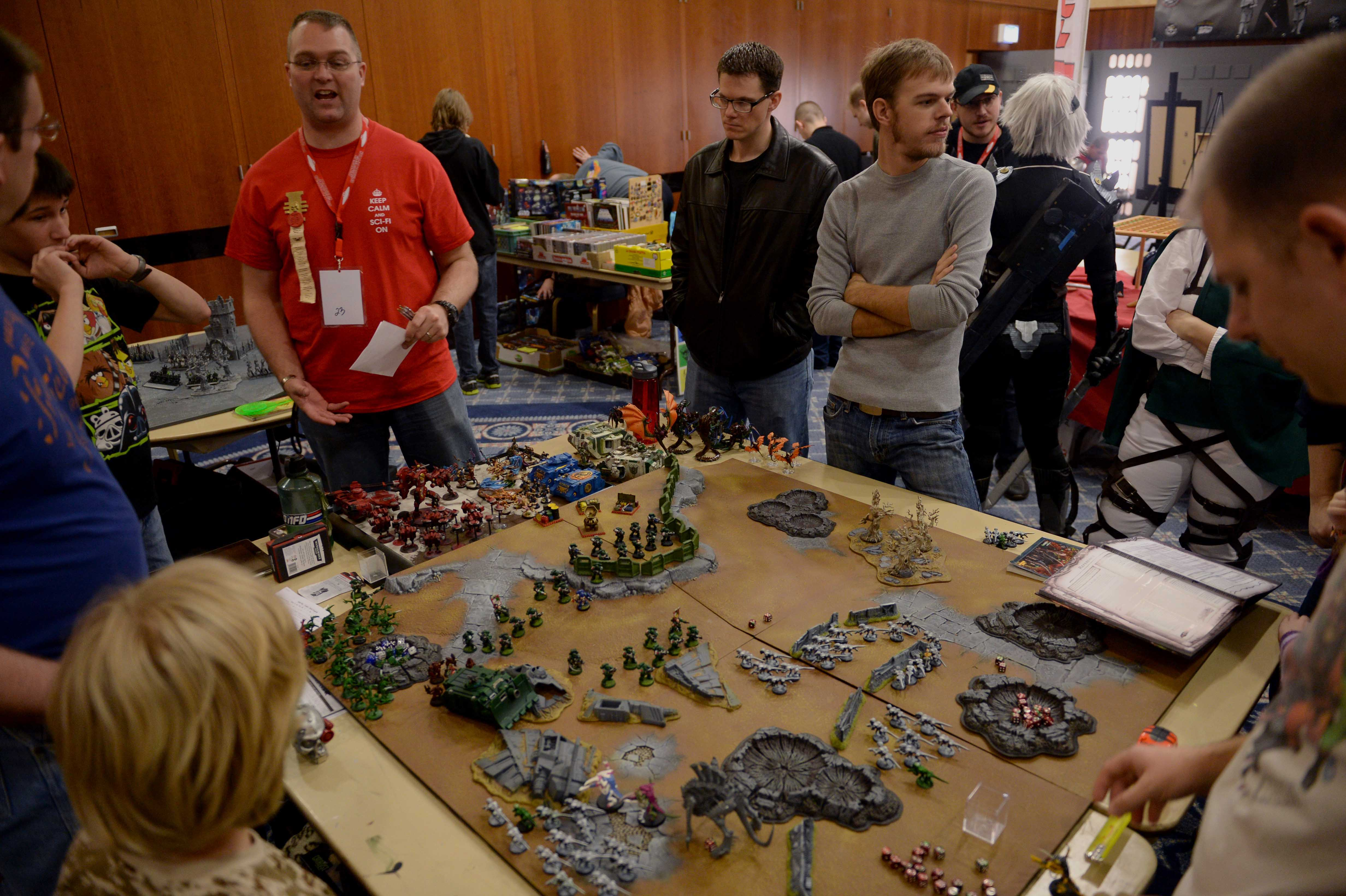
- Manufacturers: Games Workshop, Citadel Miniatures, Forge World
- Years active: 1987–present
- Players: 2+
- Setup time: 5–20+ minutes
- Playing time: 60–180+ minutes
- Chance: Medium (dice rolling)
- Skills: Strategic thinking, arithmetic, miniature painting
- Website: warhammer40000.com www.warhammer.com

Warhammer 40,000 (also known as WH40K or 40K), is a British miniature wargame produced by Games Workshop. It is the most popular miniature wargame in the world, and is particularly popular in the United Kingdom. The first edition of the rulebook was published in September 1987; the eleventh and current edition was released in June 2026.

As in other miniature wargames, players enact battles using miniature models of warriors and fighting vehicles. The playing area is a tabletop model of a battlefield, comprising models of buildings, hills, trees, and other terrain features. Each player takes turns moving their model warriors around the battlefield and fighting their opponent's warriors. These fights are resolved using dice and simple arithmetic.

Warhammer 40,000 is set in the distant future, where a stagnant human civilisation is beset by hostile aliens and supernatural creatures. The models in the game are a mixture of humans, aliens, and supernatural monsters wielding futuristic weaponry and supernatural powers. The fictional setting of the game has been developed through a large body of novels published by Black Library, Games Workshop's publishing division. Warhammer 40,000 was initially conceived as a sci-fi counterpart to Warhammer Fantasy Battle, a medieval fantasy wargame also produced by Games Workshop. Warhammer Fantasy shares some themes and characters with Warhammer 40,000 but the two settings are independent of each other. The game has received widespread praise for the tone and depth of its setting, and is considered the foundational work of the grimdark genre of speculative fiction, the word grimdark itself derived from the series' tagline: "In the grim darkness of the far future, there is only war".

Warhammer 40,000 has spawned many spin-off media. Games Workshop has produced a number of other tabletop or board games connected to the brand, including extrapolations of the mechanics and scale of the base game to simulate unique situations, as with Space Hulk, Necromunda, Kill Team, and other wargames simulating vastly different scales and aspects of warfare within the same fictional setting, as with Battlefleet Gothic, Adeptus Titanicus or Warhammer Epic. With a partnership with Fantasy Flight Games and later Cubicle 7, there was a line of Warhammer 40,000 Role-playing games. Video game spin-offs, such as Dawn of War, the Space Marine series, Darktide, the Warhammer 40,000: Rogue Trader role-playing video game, and others have been released. The setting has been adapted into film and animated productions, including the 2010 animated CGI movie Ultramarines: A Warhammer 40,000 Movie and a number of animated web series produced by Games Workshop's Warhammer+ streaming service.

== Overview ==
Note: The overview here refers to the 10th edition of the rules.

The rulebooks and miniature models required to play Warhammer 40,000 are subject to copyright and sold exclusively by Games Workshop and its subsidiaries. These miniatures, in combination with other materials (dice, measuring tools, glue, paints, etc.), are generally more expensive than other tabletop games. A new player can expect to spend at least £200 to assemble enough materials for a regular game, and the armies that appear in tournaments can be many times more.

=== Miniature models ===
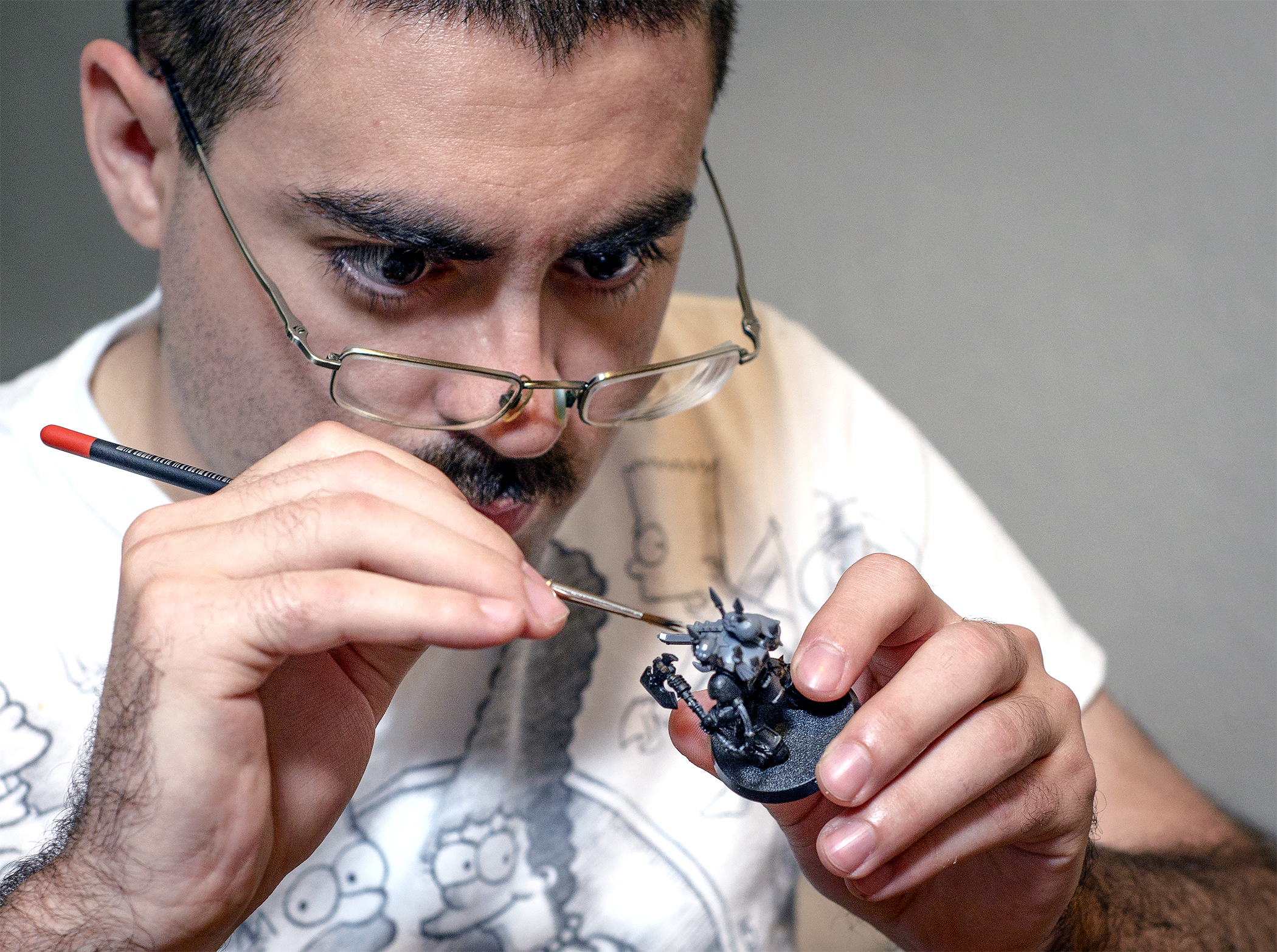
The assembly and painting of models is an aspect of the hobby as important as the game itself.

Games Workshop sells a large variety of gaming models for Warhammer 40,000, but no ready-to-play models. Rather, it sells boxes of model parts, which players are expected to assemble and paint themselves. Each miniature model represents an individual soldier, vehicle, or monster. Most Warhammer 40,000 models are made of polystyrene but certain models, which are made and sold in small volumes, are made of lead-free pewter or epoxy resin. Games Workshop also sells glue, tools, and acrylic paints for finishing models. The assembly and painting of the models is a major aspect of the hobby, and many customers of Games Workshop buy models simply to paint and display them. A player might spend weeks assembling and painting models before they have a playable army.

=== Playing field ===
The current official rulebook recommends a table width of 44 inches (1.1 m), and table length varies based on the size of the armies being used (discussed below). In contrast to board games, Warhammer 40,000 does not have a fixed playing field. Players construct their own custom-made battlefield using modular terrain models. Games Workshop sells a variety of proprietary terrain models, but players often use generic or homemade ones. Unlike certain other miniature wargames such as BattleTech, Warhammer 40,000 does not use a grid system, so players must use a measuring tape to measure distances, which are measured in inches.

=== Assembling armies ===
All the models that a player has selected to use in a match are collectively termed an "army." In Warhammer 40,000, players are not restricted to playing with a fixed and symmetrical combination of game pieces, such as in chess. They get to choose which models they will fight with from a catalogue of "datasheets" presented in the rulebooks. Each datasheet corresponds to a particular model and contains any relevant gameplay statistics and permissible attachments. For instance, a model of a Tactical Space Marine has a "Move" range of 6 inches and a "Toughness" rating of 4 and is armed with a "boltgun" with a range of 24 inches. Both players must declare which models they will play with before the match starts, and once the match is underway, they cannot add any new models to their armies.

In official tournaments, it is mandatory for players to only use Games Workshop's models, and those models must be properly assembled to match the player's army roster. Substitute models are forbidden. For example, if a player wants to use an Ork Weirdboy in their army, they must use an Ork Weirdboy model from Games Workshop. "Kitbashed" models, or models which incorporate parts from multiple models to create a unique kit to the creator, are occasionally allowed, with the regulation often being that the model must consist of 51–75% Games Workshop produced plastic, with the remainder being modelling supplies which help sculpt pieces together, such as "Green Stuff", a type of two-part epoxy putty, as long as the model is easily identifiable as what it represents, on an equivalent base size, and is of a similar size and visual profile to what it is standing in as. Games Workshop has also banned the use of 3D-printed miniatures in official tournaments. Public tournaments organised by independent groups might permit third-party models so long as the models are clearly identifiable as to which Warhammer 40,000 model they are meant to represent. Tournaments might also have rules regarding whether armies are permitted to be used unpainted or must be painted to a certain standard.

The composition of the players' armies must fit the rivalries and alliances depicted in the setting. All models listed in the rulebooks have keywords that divide them into factions. In a matched game, a player may only use models in their army that are all loyal to a common faction. Thus, a player cannot, for example, use a mixture of Aeldari and Necron models in their army, because in the game's fictional setting, Aeldari and Necrons are mortal enemies and would never fight alongside each other. Rules exist however, to allow for models from certain armies to work together.

Forces aligned to the Imperium of Man can bring in "allied" units from the Imperial Agents army using the rules from their book, and those from the Imperial Knights army, using their "freeblade" rules. Respectively, those aligned with the forces of Chaos can add Chaos Knights with their "dreadblade" rules. Chaos armies can also bring units from the Chaos Demons Index. The rules to do this are more specific, requiring equal or more demons units with the keyword "Battleline" on their datasheet in the army than those without, and their collective points cost being less than or equal to a quarter of the allowed points.

The game uses a point system to ensure that the match will be "balanced", i.e., the armies will be of comparable overall strength. The players must agree as to what "points limit" they will play at, which roughly determines how big and powerful their respective armies will be. Each model and weapon has a "point value" which roughly corresponds to how powerful the model is; for example, a Tactical Space Marine is valued at 13 points, whereas a Land Raider tank is valued at 240 points. The sum of the point values of a player's models must not exceed the agreed limit. If the point values of the players' respective armies both add up to the limit, they are assumed to be balanced. 500 to 2,000 points are common point limits.

Although the rules place no limit on how big an army can be, players tend to use armies comprising between a few dozen to a hundred models, depending on its faction. A large army will slow down the pace of the match as the players must physically handle many more models and consider each strategically. Larger armies also cost more money and take more work to paint and assemble.

=== Gameplay ===
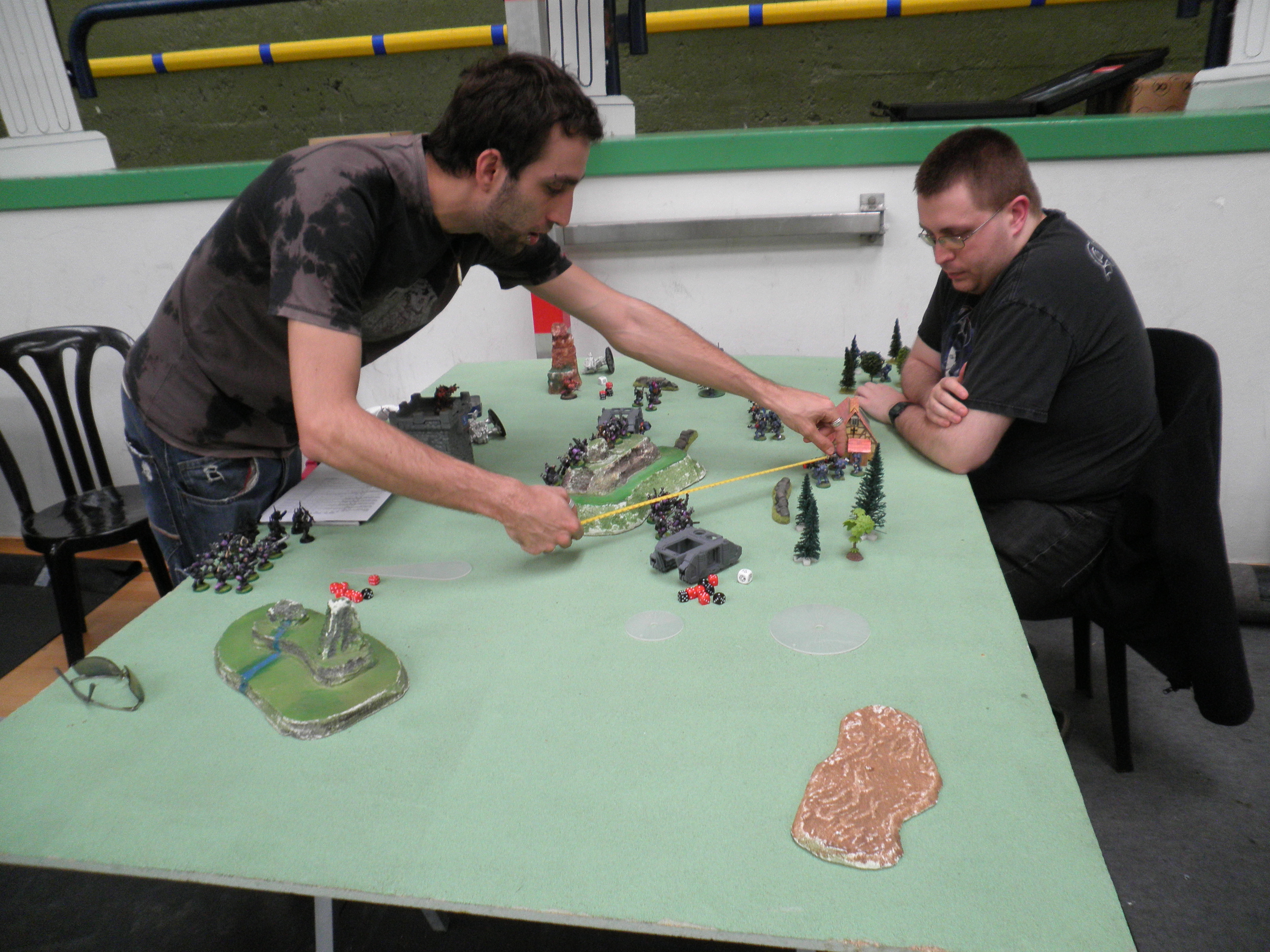
Distances must be measured with measuring tape as there is no grid.

At the start of a game, each player places their models in the initial deployment zones at opposite ends of the playing field. The players roll dice to determine who takes the first turn.

At the start of a turn, a player will have a command phase, in which they gain one "command point", which is used for stratagems. Certain abilities possessed by models activate in this phase, and some stratagems can only be used in this phase. A player will also roll a "battle shock" test for each of their units reduced to "half strength" or with half or less models / "wounds" remaining. If this morale test is failed, the unit will lose its "objective control" and its ability to use stratagems until the next command phase, when that unit is allowed to retake the "battle shock" test.

In the first phase of play, a player moves each model in their army by hand across the field. A model can be moved no farther than its listed "Move characteristic". For instance, a Space Marine model can be moved no farther than six inches per turn. If a model cannot fly or use a jump pack, it must go around obstacles such as walls and trees. However, models with the "Infantry" and the "Beast" keyword can move through terrain designated as a "ruin" in the 10th edition of Warhammer.

Models are grouped into "units", commonly called squads, that move as a whole. All models in a unit must stay close to each other. Each model in a unit must finish a turn within two inches of another model from the unit. If there are more than five models in a unit, each model must be within two inches of two other models.

After moving, each model can attack any enemy unit within range and line-of-fire of whatever weapons and psychic powers its models have. For instance, a model of a Space Marine armed with a "boltgun" weapon can shoot any enemy unit within 24 inches. Most of the races in the game have units with psychic powers, who are called psykers. Prior to the release of the 10th edition of the game, psyker units had the ability to cause unusual effects that function similarly to magic in a fantasy universe, such as rendering allied units invulnerable or teleporting units across the battlefield. The 10th Edition rules no longer use this feature.

After ranged weapons are used, each unit can charge into melee range against enemy units. Units engaged in melee combat then take turns attacking each other until they all have fought. Units cannot shoot at an enemy unit that is engaged in melee combat with a friendly unit.

When it is their turn to attack, the player declares to their opponent whichever of the models is attacking whichever enemy unit, and rolls dice to determine how much damage their models inflict upon their targets. The attacking player cannot target individual models within an enemy unit. If an enemy unit receives damage, the enemy player chooses which model in the unit suffers injury. Damage is measured in points, and if a model suffers more points of damage than its "Wound characteristic" permits, it dies. Dead models are removed from the playing field. Most models have only one Wound point, but certain models such as "hero characters", vehicles and elite troops have multiple Wound points, so the damage they accumulate must be recorded.

=== Victory conditions ===
A game of Warhammer 40,000 lasts until each player has taken five turns. A player wins the game when the turn limit ends and they have the most victory points. How players score victory points depends on what kind of "mission" was selected for the game. The most common way for players to score victory points is by controlling objective markers. Objective markers are 40mm markers placed on the playing field, positioned in accordance with the mission rules.

Players score victory points on their turns when their allied models outnumber the enemy models positioned near the objective markers. Players might also have faction-specific ways to gain victory points, such as exterminating the enemy, or retaining possession of a holy relic that was placed somewhere on the playing field prior to the start of match for a certain number of turns.

== Setting ==
Most Warhammer 40,000 fiction is set around 40,000 AD. Though Warhammer 40,000 is mostly a sci-fi setting, it adapts a number of tropes from fantasy fiction, such as magic, supernatural beings, daemonic possession, and fantasy races such as orcs and elves. "Psykers" fill the role of wizards in the setting. The setting of this game inherits many fantasy tropes from Warhammer Fantasy, a similar wargame from Games Workshop, and by extension from Dungeons & Dragons.

Games Workshop used to make miniature models for use in Dungeons & Dragons. Warhammer Fantasy was originally meant to encourage customers to buy more miniature models. Warhammer 40,000 was originally conceived as a science-fiction spin-off of Warhammer Fantasy. Though the games share some characters and tropes, their settings are separate.

The setting of Warhammer 40,000 is violent and pessimistic: human scientific and social progress have ceased; humanity is in a state of total war with hostile alien races and occult forces; and the supernatural exists, is powerful and is usually untrustworthy if not outright malevolent. There are effectively no benevolent gods or spirits in the cosmos, only daemons and evil gods, and the cults dedicated to them are proliferating. In the long run, the Imperium of Man cannot hope to defeat its enemies, so the heroes of the Imperium are not fighting for a brighter future but "raging against the dying of the light". Through constant sacrifice and toil, the Imperium delays its inevitable doom. The tone of the game's setting, exemplified by its slogan "In the grim darkness of the far future, there is only war", shaped the "grimdark" subgenre of sci-fi, which is particularly amoral, dystopian or violent.

As the setting is based on a wargame, the spin-off novels and comic books are often war dramas with protagonists being warriors of some sort, the most popular being the Space Marines. Otherwise, they tend to be aristocrats of some sort such as Inquisitors, Rogue Traders, or Eldar princes, because only such people have the resources and liberty to have a meaningful impact on a galaxy-spanning setting whose civilisations are mostly autocratic.

=== Psykers ===
The source of magic is a parallel universe of supernatural energy, "the Warp". All living things with souls are tied to the Warp, but certain individuals called "psykers" have an especially strong link and can manipulate the Warp's energy to work magic. Psykers are generally feared and mistrusted by humans. Psykers may have many dangerous abilities such as mind control, clairvoyance, and pyrokinesis. Moreover, the Warp is full of predatory creatures that may use a psyker's link to the Warp as a conduit by which to invade realspace. But for all the dangers that psykers pose, human civilisation cannot do without them: their telepathic powers provide faster-than-light communication and they are the best counter to supernatural foes on the battlefield. For this reason, the Imperium rounds up any psykers it finds and trains them to control their abilities and resist Warp predators. Those who fail or reject this training are executed for the safety of all. Those who pass their training are pressed into life-long servitude to the state and are closely monitored for misconduct and spiritual corruption.

=== Influences ===
Rick Priestley cites J. R. R. Tolkien, H. P. Lovecraft, Dune, Paradise Lost, and 2000 AD as major influences on the setting.

The Chaos Gods were added to the setting by Bryan Ansell and developed further by Priestley. Priestley felt that Warhammer's concept of Chaos, as detailed by Ansell in the supplement Realms of Chaos, was too simplistic and too similar to the works of Michael Moorcock, so he developed it further, taking inspiration from Paradise Lost. The story of the Emperor's favoured sons succumbing to the temptations of Chaos deliberately parallels the fall of Satan in Paradise Lost. The religious themes are primarily inspired by the early history of Christianity. Daemons in WH40K are the embodiment of human nightmares and dark emotion, given physical form and sentience by the Warp—this idea comes from the 1956 movie Forbidden Planet. Chaos carries a lot of influences from H. P. Lovecraft, such as mystical artefacts that drive people insane and secretive cults dedicated to evil gods.

The Emperor of Man was inspired by various fictional god-kings, such as Leto Atreides II from the novel God Emperor of Dune by Frank Herbert, and King Huon from the Runestaff novels by Michael Moorcock.

Humans fear artificial intelligence and creating or protecting an artificial intelligence (or 'abominable intelligence') is a capital offence (though most 'crimes' such as petty theft or adjusting machinery are also capital offences in the Imperium). This comes from the Dune novels. As in the Dune setting, the prohibition on artificial intelligence was passed after an ancient war against malevolent androids.

To me the background to 40K was always intended to be ironic. [...] The fact that the Space Marines were lauded as heroes within Games Workshop always amused me, because they're brutal, but they're also completely self-deceiving. The whole idea of the Emperor is that you don't know whether he's alive or dead. The whole Imperium might be running on superstition. There's no guarantee that the Emperor is anything other than a corpse with a residual mental ability to direct spacecraft. It's got some parallels with religious beliefs and principles, and I think a lot of that got missed and overwritten.

— Rick Priestley, in a December 2015 interview with Unplugged Games

== Factions ==
Models available for play in Warhammer 40,000 are divided into "factions". Under normal circumstances, a player can only use units from the same faction in their army.

=== The Imperium of Man ===
An Imperial Guardsman

The Imperium of Man is described as an authoritarian techno-feudal theocratic human empire that comprises approximately 1 million worlds and has existed for over 10,000 years. The faction abhors aliens to the point that associating with aliens is a capital offence. The state religion of the Imperium is centred on its founder, the Emperor of Mankind, who united humanity millennia earlier. Although the Emperor is its nominal ruler, he was mortally wounded in battle and lives on life support in a vegetative state. Despite his condition, his mind still generates a psychic beacon called "the Astronomican" by which starships navigate the Warp. Although the Imperium has highly advanced technology, most of its technologies have not improved for thousands of years due to religious taboos against science and innovation.

Most Warhammer 40,000 fiction is written from the perspective of the Imperium.

Of all the factions in the Warhammer 40,000 universe, the Imperium has the most sub-factions and largest catalogue of models. The most common are the Space Marines (Adeptus Astartes) and Imperial Guard (Astra Militarum), each of which can be further subdivided into hundreds of Chapters and Regiments (Militarum Regimentos), respectively. Some notable Imperial Guard units include the Cadian Shock Troops and the Death Korps of Krieg, the latter based on World War I Germany. Other playable Imperium sub-factions in the tenth edition of Warhammer 40,000 tabletop include the Sisters of Battle (Adepta Sororitas, often described as the female equivalent of Space Marines), Adeptus Custodes (bodyguards of the Emperor at the Imperial Palace), Adeptus Mechanicus (Tech-Priests who are a mix of flesh and machine), and Imperial Knights (battle mechs which tower above all troops/tanks while being smaller than Titan Legions). Each player builds their army around a specific sub-faction and its focused play style. For instance, an army of Space Marines will consist of a small number of powerful infantry, whereas an Imperial Guard army will have weak but plentiful infantry combined with strong artillery.

In theory, while the Imperium of Man's variety of sub-factions gives Imperial players the choices and flexibility to design their army for any style of play, most in-game army lists do not permit an Imperial player to field an army with units from different sub-factions (i.e. one cannot mix Space Marine infantry with Imperial Guard tanks). However in Epic an Imperial player may supplement their Space Marine or Imperial Guard forces with towering mecha from the Imperial Knights and/or Titan Legions, plus support from the Imperial Navy for aerial units and orbital bombardments. Two or more different Imperial sub-faction armies (each led by a separate player) can form an alliance in large multiplayer games.

=== Chaos ===
A Chaos Space Marine

Chaos represents the myriad servants of the Chaos Gods, malevolent and depraved entities and daemons who formed from the base thoughts and emotions of all mortal sentients. Those exposed to the influence of Chaos are twisted in both mind and body and perform sordid acts of devotion to their dark gods, who in turn reward them with "gifts" such as physical mutations, psychic power, and mystical artefacts. Like their gods, the servants of Chaos are malevolent and insane, adopting the aesthetics of body horror and cosmic horror in the design of their models and story details. The struggle against Chaos is central to the setting of Warhammer 40,000.

As with the Imperium, Chaos players have access to a large variety of models, allowing them to design their army for any style of play. Certain models of Chaos Daemons can be used for Warhammer 40,000 and Warhammer Age of Sigmar (or its predecessor, Warhammer Fantasy Battle). Several Chaos factions and their model range are derived from their Imperium counterparts but have a corrupted/warped aesthetic due to the influence of Chaos Gods, such as Chaos Space Marines (also known as Traitor Marines, Renegade Marines, or Heretic Astartes), Chaos Knight Houses, and Traitor Titan Legions. Army lists require players to theme their army around a particular Chaos god or play as Chaos Undivided which focuses the style of play. For instance, an army themed around Nurgle will consist of slow-moving but tough troops. Likewise, a Chaos army themed around Khorne will lean towards melee combat and eschew psykers.

=== Necrons ===
A Necron warrior

The Necrons are an ancient race of skeleton-like androids. Millions of years ago, they were a race of flesh-and-blood beings who were convinced by the star gods known as the C'tan to transfer their minds into android bodies, thereby achieving immortality. However, the transference process was flawed, with the Necrons' souls being devoured and the majority of the population bar the ruling class becoming mindless automata. Following the conflict known as the War in Heaven the Necrons would revolt against the C'tan, shattering their physical forms before entering a period of hibernation. In the 41st millennium, the Necrons are waking up from millions of years of stasis in underground vaults on planets across the galaxy and seek to rebuild their old empire. Besides the cyborgs from the Terminator franchise, Necron designs tend to evoke ancient Egypt in their aesthetics.

Necron infantry have strong ranged firepower, tough armour, and slow movement. Necron units can rapidly regenerate wounds or "reanimate" killed models at the start of the player's turn. Necrons rarely suffer from morale failure, which was reflected by all models having a Leadership score of 10 (the maximum possible) in the 8th and 9th editions of the tabletop game. Necrons do not have any psykers due to lacking souls, but they possess psyker-like units in the form of tech sorcerers known as "Crypteks", alongside the enslaved shards of the C'tan.

=== Aeldari ===
A Craftworld Aeldari warrior.

The Aeldari (formerly called the Eldar) are based on Elves of fantasy fiction. Aeldari have very long lifespans and all of them have some psychic ability. The Aeldari travel the galaxy via a network of magical tunnels called "the Webway", to which they have exclusive access. In the distant past, the Aeldari ruled an empire that dominated much of the galaxy, but it was destroyed in a magical cataclysm along with most of the population. The surviving Aeldari are divided into two major subfactions: the ascetic Asuryani, inhabitants of massive starships called Craftworlds (also known as "Craftworld Eldar" or simply "Eldar"); and the sadistic Drukhari (also known as "Dark Eldar"), who inhabit a city hidden within the Webway and must inflict pain on others to survive. There are a number of minor subfactions too: the Exodites, who foresaw the collapse of the empire and now lead simple and austere lives on Maiden Worlds; the Harlequins, followers of the Laughing God Cegorach; and the Ynnari, followers of the death god Ynnead. Although it has been 10,000 years since their empire's fall, the Aeldari have never recovered, due to their low fertility and aggression by other races.

Craftworld Aeldari infantry tend to be highly specialised and relatively frail, often described as "glass cannons" because of their lack of staying power and flexibility, Aeldari armies can suffer severe losses after a bad tactical decision or even unlucky dice rolls, while successful gameplay can involve outnumbered Aeldari units that outmanoeuvre the opponent and kill entire units/squads before they have a chance to retaliate. Aeldari vehicles, unlike their infantry counterparts, are very tough and hard to kill because of many evasive and shielding benefits. With the exception of walkers, all Aeldari vehicles are skimmers which allow them to move freely across difficult terrain, and with upgrades, at speeds only matched by the Drukhari and the T'au armies. Drukhari are similar to Craftworld Aeldari, with the major differences being that they have no psykers and their vehicles tend to be open-topped, allowing infantry to shoot from them.

=== Orks ===
An Ork Boy

The Orks are green-skinned aliens based on the traditional orcs of high fantasy. Orks are a comical species, with crude personalities, ramshackle weaponry, and Cockney accents. Their "kultur" revolves around war for the sake of it. Unlike other races who generally only go to war when it is in their interest, Orks recklessly start unnecessary conflicts for the pleasure of a good fight. Orks do not fear death, and combat is the only thing that gives them emotional fulfilment. Ork technology consists of dashed-together scrap that by all logic should be unreliable if even functional, but Orks generate a psychic field that makes their ramshackle technology work properly or more effectively (for example, vehicles painted red are faster, simply because the Orks believe it to be so). If a non-Ork tries to use a piece of Ork technology, it would likely malfunction. Orks have a preference for weapons with high rates of fire and they believe that the louder a weapon is, the better it is. These qualities are known to Orks as "dakka".

Orks are a genderless, asexually reproducing species, whose biology is a combination of animals and fungi. Throughout their lives, Orks release fungal spores which begin a lifecycle of various Orkoid species, which ultimately leads into Orks. Orks release these spores particularly at the time of death. As a result, a planet which has been invaded by Orks is extremely difficult to be rid of Orks entirely, as these spores mean that new Orks will be born on it. Thanks to this reproductive method, Orks are the most numerous species in the galaxy.

Ork "kultur" is centred around the WAAAGH!, which for Orks has several meanings. One meaning is Ork warbands, led by large and powerful Orks known as warbosses, and the WAAAGH! is generally named after the warboss. A campaign led by one of these warbosses is also known as a WAAAGH!. WAAAGH! is also the name used for the psychic gestalt field generated by the Orks, which allows Ork technology to function provided enough Orks believe it should. WAAAGH! is also what draws Orks to a warboss, since that is how they recognise someone to be "bigga" and "greena" and therefore "betta". Finally, WAAAGH! is used as a warcry by all Orks.

Ork infantry models are slow-moving and tough. The Orks are oriented towards melee combat. Infantry models are cheap (by point cost), so a favourite strategy of Ork players is "the Green tide": they field a large horde of Ork infantry and march them across the playing field to swarm the opponent. Orks do have a number of specialist units with abilities such as psychic powers or vehicle repair, but typically Ork warfare is about brute force and attrition. Ork gameplay is seen as fairly forgiving of tactical errors and bad die rolls.

Orks were primarily inspired by football hooligans.

=== Tyranids ===
A Tyranid Warrior

The Tyranids are a mysterious extra-galactic alien race. They migrate from planet to planet, devouring all life in their path. Tyranids are linked by a psychic hive mind and individual Tyranids become feral when separated from it. Tyranid technology is entirely biological, all ships and weapons being purpose-bred living creatures.

Tyranids have a preference for melee combat. Their infantry models tend to be numerous and fast but frail. They have low point costs, meaning Tyranid armies in the game are relatively large (many cheap weak models, as opposed to armies with few expensive powerful models such as the Imperial Knights). The Synaptic network is an aura around powerful leader beasts that compels Tyranids to fight on in spite of losses.

There is a sub-species of the Tyranid race called "genestealers". When a human is infected by a genestealer, they are psychically enslaved and will sire children who are human-genestealer hybrids. These hybrids will form a secret society known as a genestealer cult within their host human society, steadily expanding their numbers and political influence. When a Tyranid fleet approaches their planet, they will launch an uprising to weaken the planet's defences so that the Tyranids may more easily conquer it and consume its biomass.

In earlier editions of the game, Genestealer Cults could only be used as auxiliaries to a regular Tyranid army, but since the 8th edition, they can be played as a separate army. Although there is a dedicated line of Genestealer Cult models, a player can also use models from the Imperial Guard (a sub-faction of the Imperium) in their Genestealer Cult army. This is an exception to the common-faction rule and is based on the logic that these "human" models are actually genestealer hybrids who look perfectly human. Like other Tyranids, Genestealers are fast and hard-hitting but fragile. All Genestealer Cult infantry and bikers have a trait called "Cult Ambush" that allows them to start the match off table and later be set up on the table, instead of being set up in the designated starting zones at the start of the game (similar to the "Deep Strike" deployment ability).

The visual design of the Tyranids is inspired by the art of H. R. Giger, with the genestealer sub-race being further inspired by the Xenomorphs from the Alien franchise.

=== T'au ===
A T'au warrior

The T'au are a young race of blue-skinned humanoid aliens inhabiting a relatively small but growing empire located on the fringe of the Imperium of Man. The T'au Empire is the only playable faction in the setting that integrates different alien species into their society. The T'au seek to unite all other races under an ideology they call "the Greater Good." Some human worlds have willingly defected from the Imperium to join the T'au Empire. Such humans tend to have a better quality of life than Imperial citizens because the T'au practise humane ethics and encourage scientific progress. The T'au are divided into five endogamous castes: the Ethereals, who are the spiritual leaders; the Fire Caste, who form the T'au military; the Air Caste, who operate starships and aircraft; the Water Caste, who are merchants and diplomats; and the Earth Caste, who are scientists, engineers, and labourers.

The T'au are oriented towards ranged combat and generally shun melee. They have some of the most powerful firearms in the game in terms of both range and stopping power. For instance, their pulse rifle surpasses the firepower of the Space Marine boltgun, and the railgun on their main battle tank (the Hammerhead) is more powerful than its Imperium counterparts. The T'au currently do not have any psykers. Most T'au vehicles are classified as flyers or skimmers, meaning they can move swiftly over difficult terrain. The T'au also incorporate alien auxiliaries into their army: examples include the Kroot who provide melee support and the insectoid Vespids who serve as fast-attack infantry.

The T'au are influenced by Japanese feudalism and samurai society. Aesthetically, T'au infantry are based upon samurai armour, while their vehicles are similar to Mecha anime and manga, being very distinct from the organic-looking Eldar skimmers and the crude-looking Imperium tanks.

=== Leagues of Votann ===
A Hearthkyn warrior of the Leagues of Votann

The Leagues of Votann are a confederation of abhumans known interchangeably as Squats and Kin, which are based on the dwarves of fantasy fiction. They are a spiritual successor to an earlier Squat faction that was removed from the setting for not fitting in thematically.

Though Squats are a subspecies of humanity, the Leagues of Votann stand independent of the Imperium of Man. Unlike the Imperium, the Leagues of Votann have no qualms about using artificial intelligence, treating their androids as fellow Kin. Kin culture is centred around the Votann, extremely powerful supercomputers responsible for managing the majority of Kin society and keeping records. The Kin are extremely competitive and capitalistic, with powerful corporations (referred to as Guilds) regularly strip-mining entire planets for resources. While the Kin have no natural psychic abilities, they do have artificial psykers referred to as Grimnyrs, who are responsible for communicating with the Votann.

The Leagues have a preference for ranged combat and siege tactics. Their infantry is slow but sturdy.

== History ==
In 1982, Rick Priestley joined Citadel Miniatures, a company started with support from Games Workshop that produced miniature figurines for use in Dungeons & Dragons. Bryan Ansell (the manager of Citadel) asked Priestley to develop a medieval-fantasy miniature wargame that would be given away for free to customers so as to encourage them to buy more miniatures. Dungeons & Dragons did not require players to use miniature figurines, and even when players used them, they rarely needed more than a handful. The result was Warhammer Fantasy Battle, which was released in 1983 to great success.

Warhammer Fantasy was principally a medieval fantasy game in the vein of Dungeons & Dragons, but Priestley and his fellow designers added a smattering of optional science fiction elements, namely in the form of advanced technological artefacts (e.g., laser weapons) left behind by a long-gone race of spacefarers. Warhammer 40,000 was an evolution of this taken to the opposite extreme (i.e., mostly science-fiction but with some fantasy elements).

Since before working for Games Workshop, Priestley had been developing a spaceship combat tabletop wargame called "Rogue Trader", which mixed science fiction with classic fantasy elements. Priestley integrated many elements of the lore of "Rogue Trader" into Warhammer 40,000, chiefly those concerning space travel, but he discarded the ship combat rules for lack of space in the book. (Note: Priestley had, with Richard Halliwell, written a set of science fiction table top miniatures rules called Combat 3000 in 1980.)

Games Workshop planned to sell conversion kits by which players could modify their Warhammer Fantasy models to wield futuristic weaponry such as laser weapons, but eventually Games Workshop decided to create a dedicated line of models for Warhammer 40,000. However, certain models of Chaos Daemons can be used for both Warhammer 40,000 and Warhammer Fantasy (or its successor, Warhammer Age of Sigmar).

Initially, Priestley's new game was simply to be titled Rogue Trader, but shortly before release Games Workshop signed a contract with 2000 AD to develop a board game based on their comic book Rogue Trooper. So as not to confuse customers and to satisfy the demand for the Rogue Trader game which had been promised since 1983, Games Workshop renamed Priestley's game Warhammer 40,000: Rogue Trader and marketed it as a spin-off of Warhammer Fantasy Battle (which in many ways, it was).

Warhammer 40,000: Rogue Trader received its first full preview in White Dwarf issue number 93 (September 1987).

Warhammer 40,000: Rogue Trader was released in October 1987. It was a success and became Games Workshop's most important product. In the January 1988 edition of Dragon (issue 129), Ken Rolston raved about this game, calling it "colossal, stupendous, and spectacular... This is the first science-fiction/fantasy to make my blood boil."

=== First edition (Warhammer 40,000: Rogue Trader) (1987) ===
The first edition of the game was titled Warhammer 40,000: Rogue Trader, and its rules are based on Warhammer Fantasy Battle. "Rogue Trader" had been the game's working title during development. The "Rogue Trader" subtitle was dropped in subsequent editions. It was published in 1987. Game designer Rick Priestley created the original rules set (based on the contemporary second edition of Warhammer Fantasy Battle) alongside the Warhammer 40,000 gameworld. The gameplay of Rogue Trader was more oriented toward role-playing rather than strict wargaming with instructions for a third person to act as gamesmaster to umpire the game. This original version came as a very detailed, though rather jumbled, rulebook, which made it most suitable for fighting small skirmishes. Much of the composition of the units was determined randomly, by rolling dice. A few elements of the setting (bolters, lasguns, frag grenades, Terminator armour) can be seen in a set of earlier wargaming rules called Laserburn (produced by the now defunct company Tabletop Games) written by Bryan Ansell. These rules were later expanded by both Ansell and Richard Halliwell (both of whom ended up working for Games Workshop), although the rules were not a precursor to Rogue Trader.

Supplemental material was continually published in White Dwarf magazine, which provided rules for new units and models. Eventually, White Dwarf provided proper "army lists" that could be used to create larger and more coherent forces than were given in the main rulebook. These articles were from time to time released in expansion books along with new rules, background materials and illustrations. Ten books were released for the original edition of Warhammer 40,000: Chapter Approved—Book of the Astronomican, Compendium, Warhammer 40,000 Compilation, Waaagh—Orks, two Realm of Chaos volumes (Slaves to Darkness and The Lost and the Damned – the books covering WFB, WH Fantasy Role Play, and WH40K), 'Ere we Go and Freebooterz (for Ork players), Battle Manual, and Vehicle Manual. The Battle Manual changed and codified the combat rules and provided updated stats for most of the weapons in the game. The Vehicle Manual contained a new system for vehicle management on the tabletop which was intended to supersede the clunky rules given in the base hardback manual and in the red softback compendium; it had an inventive target location system which used an acetate sheet with crosshairs to simulate weapon hits on the vehicle silhouettes with different armour values for different locations (such as tracks, engine compartment, ammunition store, and so on). Waaagh—Orks was an introductory manual to Orkish culture and physiology. It contained no rules, but background material. The other Ork-themed books had army lists for major Ork clans and also for pirate and mercenary outfits.

Realm of Chaos: Slaves to Darkness and Realm of Chaos: The Lost and the Damned are of particular note, as they added the Chaos Gods and their daemons to the setting along with the Horus Heresy origin story.

The artwork of the 1st edition books was a mishmash of styles from a variety of science-fiction works, such as H. R. Giger, Star Wars, and 2000AD comics. In subsequent editions, the artwork of Warhammer 40,000 moved towards a more coherent aesthetic based around Gothic architecture and art.

=== Second edition (1993) ===
The second edition of Warhammer 40,000 was published in late 1993. The starter set included Space Marines and Orks. The box artwork (by John Blanche) and studio army depicted the Blood Angels Space Marine Chapter.

This new course for the game was forged under the direction of editor Andy Chambers. Chambers reshaped the lore in a way that was more serious and pessimistic in tone (a direction which Rick Priestley lamented). The new theme of the setting is that humanity's situation is not merely dire but hopeless, as the Imperium does not have the strength to defeat its myriad enemies and will collapse in time. This was not the case in the first edition; the first edition rulebook suggested that humanity could eventually triumph and prosper if it can survive long enough to complete its evolution into a fully psychic race, and this was the Emperor's goal.

The second edition of the game introduced army lists, putting constraints on the composition of a player's army. At least 75% of an army's strength (by point value) had to be of units from the same faction. This way, the battles that the players would play would fit the factional rivalries described in the setting. An expansion box set titled Dark Millennium was later released, which included rules for psychic powers. Another trait of the game was the attention given to "special characters" representing specific individuals from the setting, who had access to equipment and abilities beyond those of regular units; the earlier edition only had three generic "heroic" profiles for each army: "champion", "minor hero" and "major hero". A player could spend up to 50% of their army points on a special character. Such heroic characters were so powerful that the second edition was nicknamed "Herohammer".

The second edition introduced major revisions to the lore and would go on to define the general character of the lore up until the 8th edition. The Adeptus Mechanicus's prohibition on artificial intelligence was added, stemming from an ancient cataclysmic war between humans and sentient machines; this was inspired by the Dune novels.

=== Third edition (1998) ===
The third edition of the game was released in 1998 and, like the second edition, concentrated on streamlining the rules for larger battles. Third-edition rules were notably simpler. The rulebook was available alone, or as a starter boxed set with miniatures of Space Marines and the newly introduced Dark Eldar. The system of army 'codexes' continued in third edition. The box artwork and studio army depicted the Black Templars Space Marine Chapter.

Towards the end of the third edition, four new army codexes were introduced: the xeno (that is, alien) races of the Necron and the T'au and two armies of the Inquisition: the Ordo Malleus (called Daemonhunters), and the Ordo Hereticus (called Witchhunters); elements of the latter two armies had appeared before in supplementary material (such as Realm of Chaos and Codex: Sisters of Battle). At the end of the third edition, these armies were re-released with all-new artwork and army lists. The release of the T'au coincided with a rise in popularity for the game in the United States.

=== Fourth edition (2004) ===
The fourth edition of Warhammer 40,000 was released in 2004. This edition did not feature as many major changes as prior editions and was "backwards compatible" with each army's third-edition codex. The fourth edition was released in three forms: the first was a standalone hardcover version, with additional information on painting, scenery building, and background information about the Warhammer 40,000 universe. The second was a boxed set, called Battle for Macragge, which included a compact softcover version of the rules, scenery, dice, templates, and Space Marines and Tyranid miniatures. The third was a limited collector's edition. Battle for Macragge was a 'game in a box', targeted primarily at beginners. Battle for Macragge was based on the Tyranid invasion of the Ultramarines' homeworld, Macragge. An expansion to this was released called The Battle Rages On!, which featured new scenarios and units, like the Tyranid Warrior.

=== Fifth edition (2008) ===
The fifth edition of Warhammer 40,000 was released on 12 July 2008. While there are some differences between the fourth and fifth editions, the general rule set shares many similarities. Codex books designed prior to the fifth edition are still compatible with only some changes to how those armies function. The starter set was called Assault on Black Reach, which featured a pocket-sized rulebook (containing the full ruleset but omitting the background and hobby sections of the full-sized rulebook), and starter armies for the Space Marines and Orks. The box artwork and studio army depicted the Ultramarines Space Marine Chapter.

New additions to the rules included the ability for infantry models to "Go to Ground" when under fire, providing additional protection at the cost of mobility and shooting as they dive for cover. Actual line of sight is needed to fire at enemy models. Also introduced was the ability to run, whereby units may forgo shooting to cover more ground. In addition, cover was changed so that it is now easier for a unit to get a cover save. Damage to vehicles was simplified and significantly reduced, and tanks could ram other vehicles. Some of these rules were modelled after rules that existed in the Second Edition but were removed in the Third. Likewise, 5th edition codexes saw a return of many units that had been cut out in the previous edition for having unwieldy rules. These units were largely brought back with most of their old rules streamlined for the new edition. Fifth edition releases focused largely on Space Marine forces, including the abolishment of the Daemonhunters in favour of an army composed of Grey Knights, a special chapter of Space Marines, which, in previous editions, had provided the elite choices of the Daemonhunters' army list. Another major change was the shift from metal figures to resin kits.

=== Sixth edition (2012) ===
The sixth edition was released on 23 June 2012. Changes to this edition included the adoption of an optional Psychic Power card system similar to that of the game's sister product Warhammer Fantasy Battle as well as the inclusion of full rules for flying vehicles and monsters and a major reworking of the manner in which damage is resolved against vehicles. It also included expanded rules for greater interaction with scenery and more dynamic close-combat. In addition to updating existing rules and adding new ones, 6th Edition introduced several other large changes: the Alliance system, in which players can bring units from other armies to work with their own, with varying levels of trust; the choice to take one fortification as part of your force; and Warlord traits, which will allow a player's Commander to gain a categorically randomised trait that can aid their forces in different situations. The starter box set was titled "Dark Vengeance" which included the Dark Angels Space Marines and a Crimson Slaughter Chaos Space Marine Warband. Some of the early release box sets of Dark Vengeance contained a limited-edition Interrogator-Chaplain for the Dark Angels.

The Imperial Knights (Codex: Imperial Knights) were a new addition to the Imperium of Man faction. Previously found in Epic large-scale battles, particularly the Titan Legions (2nd Edition) boxed set, the Imperial Knights are walkers that are smaller than proper Imperial Titans but nonetheless tower over all other Warhammer 40,000 vehicles and troops.

=== Seventh edition (2014) ===
The seventh edition of the game was announced in White Dwarf issue 15, pre-orders for 17 May and release date of 24 May 2014.

The 7th edition saw several major changes to the game, including a dedicated Psychic Phase, as well as the way psychic powers worked overall, and changeable mid-game Tactical Objectives. Tactical Objectives would give the players alternative ways to score Victory Points, and thus win games. These objectives could change at different points during the game.

As well as these additions, the 7th edition provided a new way to organise army lists. Players could play as either Battle-Forged, making a list in the same way as 6th edition, or Unbound, which allowed the player to use any models they desired, disregarding the Force Organisation Chart. Bonuses are given to Battle-Forged armies. Additionally, Lord of War units, which are powerful units previously only allowed in large-scale ("Apocalypse") games, are now included in the standard rulebook, and are a normal part of the Force Organisation Chart.

=== Eighth edition (2017) ===
The eighth edition of the game was announced on 22 April 2017, pre-orders for 3 June and release date of 17 June 2017.

The 8th edition was the most radical revision to Warhammer 40,000's rules since the third edition. The game introduced the Three Ways to Play concept: Open, Matched, and Narrative. The core ruleset was simplified down to 14 pages, and was available as a free PDF booklet on the Games Workshop website. The more complex rules are retained in the updated hardcover Rulebook. The narrative of the setting has also been updated: an enlarged Eye of Terror has split the galaxy in half, while the Primarch Roboute Guilliman returns to lead the Imperium as its Lord Commander, beginning with reclaiming devastated worlds through the Indomitus Crusade.

The 8th Edition introduced a new box set called "Dark Imperium", which featured the next-generation Primaris Space Marines which are available as reinforcements to existing Space Marines (now known as Firstborn), as well as introducing new characters and rules to the Death Guard Chaos Space Marines. The Primaris Marines are taller and have a new helmet design compared to existing Firstborn Marines in earlier types of Power Armour. In-game, Primaris Marines are distinct units with different attributes compared to Firstborn Marines (all Firstborn marines are considered equivalent units regardless of the edition of their Power Armour design); also Primaris Marines have their own accompanying vehicles as they are not compatible with those of the Firstborn.

=== Ninth edition (2020) ===
The ninth edition was released in July 2020. With it came a redesigned logo, the first redesign since 3rd edition. The 9th edition was only a minor modification of the 8th edition's rules. Codexes, supplements and the rules from the Psychic Awakening series made for 8th edition are compatible with 9th.

Ninth edition also introduced four new box sets: "Indomitus", a limited release set that came out at the start of 9th edition, and the Recruit, Elite and Command editions. The four boxes feature revised designs and new units for the Necrons, and new units for the Primaris Space Marines.

=== Tenth edition (2023) ===
Warhammer 40,000 10th Edition was released by Games Workshop in June 2023. Significant alterations were made to the game. Tenth edition revolves around the 4th Tyrannic War, introducing fresh regulations and units for both Space Marines and Tyranids, along with significant modifications to the 41st Millennium's setting. The game has a more straightforward structure, featuring more concise Indexes and a restriction of six stratagems per army. The Psychic Phase has been eliminated, with the Morale Phase being replaced by "Battleshock" tests.

Much like Ninth edition, Tenth edition introduced four new box sets: first with "Leviathan", a limited release set that came out at the start of 10th edition. Also, three "starter sets" were introduced: the Introductory set, Starter set and Ultimate Starter set.

While Firstborn Marines and Primaris Marines miniatures were sold alongside each other between 2017 and 2023 for the eighth and ninth editions, many Firstborn sets have been discontinued coinciding with the release of the tenth edition. This decision by Games Workshop to retire Firstborn miniatures via planned obsolescence is controversial, as Primaris Marine units have better in-game abilities than their Firstborn counterparts for a given points cost, and longtime players who have collected large Firstborn armies have justifiably complained that they are being forced to purchase Primaris miniatures in order to remain competitive at official Games Workshop tournaments. Also, many of the Firstborn models were not given statlines or point values in their 10th edition codex, despite having them in their 10th edition Index cards which preceded their respective codex by only a few months.

=== Eleventh edition (2026) ===
On 26 March 2026, Games Workshop announced Eleventh edition would be releasing in June of the same year. The starter box features Blood Angels and Orks.

== Supplements and expansions ==
There are many variations to the rules and army lists that are available for use, typically with an opponent's consent. These rules are found in the Games Workshop publication White Dwarf, on the Games Workshop website, or in the Forge World Imperial Armour publications.

The rules of Warhammer 40,000 are designed for games between 500 and 3000 points, with the limits of a compositional framework called the Force Organisation Chart making games with larger point values difficult to play. In response to player comments, the Apocalypse rules expansion was introduced to allow 3000+ point games to be played. Players might field an entire 1000-man Chapter of Space Marines rather than the smaller detachment of around 30–40 typically employed in a standard game. Apocalypse also contains rules for using larger war machines such as Titans. The latest rules for Apocalypse based on the Warhammer 40,000 rules are found in Chapter Approved 2017, while a boxed set also entitled Apocalypse with an entirely different rules base was released in 2019.

Cities of Death (the revamp of Codex Battlezone: Cityfight) introduces rules for urban warfare and guerrilla warfare, and so-called "stratagems", including traps and fortifications. It also has sections on modelling city terrain and provides examples of armies and army lists modelled around the theme of urban combat. This work was updated to 7th Edition with the release of Shield of Baal: Leviathan and to 8th edition in Chapter Approved 2018.

Planetstrike, released in 2009, sets rules allowing players to represent the early stages of a planetary invasion. It introduces new game dynamics, such as dividing the players into an attacker and a defender, each having various tactical benefits tailored to their role; for example, the attacker may deep strike all infantry, jump infantry and monstrous creatures onto the battlefield, while the defender may set up all the terrain on the battlefield. Planetstrike was updated to the 8th edition of the game in Chapter Approved 2017.

Planetary Empires, released in August 2009, allows players to coordinate full-scale campaigns containing multiple battles, each using standard rules or approved supplements such as Planetstrike, Cities of Death or Apocalypse. Progress through the campaign is tracked using hexagonal tiles to represent the current control of territories within the campaign. The structure is similar to Warhammer Fantasy's Mighty Empires. The set has been out of production for many years.

Battle Missions, released in March 2010, contained a series of 'missions' with specific objectives. Each faction had three specific missions which could be played; these missions are determined by a dice roll and are usually chosen from the missions meant for the two armies being used. They still used the standard rules from the Warhammer 40,000 rule book. The Battle Missions format was never updated for 8th or 9th editions and is no longer compatible with the current iteration of the game.

Spearhead, released in May 2010, allowed players to play games with a greater emphasis on armoured and mechanised forces. The most notable change to the game is the inclusion of special "Spearhead Formations" and greater flexibility in force organisation. "Spearhead Formations" represent a new and altogether optional addition to the force organisation system standard to Warhammer 40,000. Players now have the ability to use all, part or none of the standard force organisation. Spearhead also includes new deployment options and game scenarios. This expansion was released jointly through the Games Workshop website, as a free download, and through the company's monthly hobby magazine White Dwarf. The Spearhead rules were never updated for 8th or 9th editions and are no longer compatible with the current iteration of the game, though the loosened force organisation introduced in 8th edition makes them somewhat superfluous.

Death from the Skies, released February 2013, contains rules for playing games with an emphasis on aircraft. There are specific rules for each race's aircraft, as well as playable missions. A notable inclusion in this release is "warlord traits" for each race that deal specifically with aircraft. This supplement still uses the same rules as the Warhammer 40,000 rulebook. It was updated to 7th Edition with Shield of Baal: Leviathan. Death From the Skies was not updated after 7th edition, but 8th edition and onward permit using aircraft in the core rules.

Stronghold Assault, released in December 2013, was a 48-page expansion that contains more rules for fortifications in the game, as well as rules for more fortifications than listed in the main 6th Edition rulebook. Stronghold Assault was updated for the 8th edition of the game in Chapter Approved 2017.

Escalation, released in December 2013, contained rules for playing games with super heavy vehicles, normally restricted to Apocalypse events, in normal events. Escalation was not updated, and in the current iteration of the game super heavy vehicles can be used in the core rules.

Boarding Actions, released in January 2023, was designed for smaller 500-point missions aboard spaceships. It generally follows the rules of Warhammer 40,000 with modifications such as distance being measured around terrain features rather than through, combat no longer working through walls, and models blocking line of sight. Vehicle and Monster units are not able to be played in Boarding Actions, making the game heavily focused on infantry units. Rules for Boarding Actions were released in the Arks of Omen: Abaddon book. New boxset releases called Boarding Patrols were also released to give players a starting force for use in Boarding Actions. In July 2024, a new supplement for Boarding Actions was released, adding new missions and bringing the rules fully into the 10th edition of the game.

== Spin-off games and other media ==
Games Workshop has expanded the Warhammer 40,000 universe over the years to include several spin-off games and fictional works. This expansion began in 1987, when Games Workshop asked Scott Rohan to write the first series of "literary tie-ins". This eventually led to the creation of Black Library, the publishing arm of Games Workshop, in 1997. The books published relate centrally to the backstory in the Warhammer universe. Black Library also publishes Warhammer 40,000 graphic novels.

Several popular miniature game spin-offs were created, including Space Crusade, Space Hulk, Horus Heresy, Kill Team, Battlefleet Gothic, Epic 40,000, Inquisitor, Gorkamorka, Necromunda and Assassinorum: Execution Force. A collectible card game, Dark Millennium, was launched in October 2005 by Games Workshop subsidiary, Sabertooth Games. The story behind the card game begins at the end of the Horus Heresy arc in the game storyline and contains four factions: the Imperium, Orks, Aeldari and Chaos.

=== Novels ===
Following the 1987 initial release of Games Workshop's Warhammer 40,000 wargame the company began publishing background literature that expands previous material, adds new material, and describes the universe, its characters, and its events in detail. Since 1997 the bulk of background literature has been published by the affiliated imprint Black Library.

The increasing number of fiction works by an expanding list of authors is published in several formats and media, including audio, digital and print. Most of the works, which include full-length novels, novellas, short stories, graphic novels, and audio dramas, are parts of named book series. In 2018, a line of novels for readers aged 8 to 12 was announced, which led to some confusion among fans given the ultra-violent and grimdark nature of the setting.

==== The Horus Heresy ====
One of the most successful storylines to be produced by Black Library is the Horus Heresy, a prequel series set ten thousand years prior to the main setting of the wargame and depicting the downfall of the Emperor of Mankind, setting the conflict between Chaos and the Imperium in motion. The storyline is divided across multiple series of novels and comic books.

=== Video games ===
Games Workshop first licensed Electronic Arts to produce Warhammer 40,000 video games, and EA published two games based on Space Hulk in 1993 and 1995. Games Workshop then passed the licence to Strategic Simulations, which published three games in the late 1990s. After Strategic Simulations went defunct in 1994, Games Workshop then gave the licence to THQ, and between 2003 and 2011, THQ published 13 games, which include the Dawn of War series. After 2011, Games Workshop changed its licensing strategy: instead of an exclusive licence to a single publisher, it broadly licenses a variety of publishers.

=== Board games and role-playing games ===
Games Workshop have produced a number of standalone "boxed games" set within the Warhammer 40,000 setting; they have licensed the intellectual property to other game companies such as Fantasy Flight Games. The Games Workshop-produced boxed games tend to be sold under the aegis of the "Specialist Games" division. Titles include:

- Battle for Armageddon
  - Chaos Attack (expansion for Battle for Armageddon)
- Doom of the Eldar
- Space Hulk (four editions were published; expansions are listed below)
  - Deathwing (an expansion boxed set adding new Terminator weapons and a new campaign)
  - Genestealer (an expansion boxed set adding rules for Genestealer hybrids and psychic powers)
  - Space Hulk Campaigns (an expansion book released in both soft and hard-cover collecting reprinted four campaigns previously printed in White Dwarf)
- Advanced Space Crusade
- Assassinorum: Execution Force
- Bommerz over da Sulphur River (board game using Epic miniatures)
- Gorkamorka (a vehicle skirmish game set on a desert world, revolving principally around rival Ork factions)
  - Digganob (an expansion for Gorkamorka, adding rebel gretchin and feral human factions)
- Lost Patrol
- Space Fleet (a simple spaceship combat game, later greatly expanded via White Dwarf magazine with material intended for the aborted Battleship Gothic, itself later relaunched as Battlefleet Gothic)
- Tyranid Attack (an introductory game reusing the boards from Advanced Space Crusade)
- Ultra Marines (an introductory game reusing the boards from Space Hulk)
- Blackstone Fortress (a cooperative board game set in the wreck of a large spaceship known as a Blackstone Fortress, using the Warhammer Fantasy-based Warhammer Quest system)

The success of the Horus Heresy line of novels led to a launch in 2012 of a standalone Horus Heresy tabletop wargame and rulebook, with basic models representing the eighteen Space Marine legions that precede the chapters and warbands of the 40,000 setting and named characters representing the superhuman primarchs. The game is marketed on the Games Workshop website as a separate line from the main editions of Warhammer 40,000, though some factions, like the Titans and Knights, include models or colour schemes designed to be playable in either setting.

Although there were plans to create a full-fledged Warhammer 40,000 "pen and paper" role-playing game from the beginning, these did not come to fruition for many years, until an official Warhammer 40,000 role-playing game was published only in 2008, with the release of Dark Heresy by Black Industries, a Games Workshop subsidiary. This system was later licensed to Fantasy Flight Games for continued support and expansion.

Formerly Games Workshop licensed a number of Warhammer 40,000 themed products to Fantasy Flight Games. They specialise in board, card and role-playing games. Included in the licensed product were:

- Horus Heresy: a board game focusing on the final battle of the Horus Heresy the battle for the Emperor's Palace; this game is a re-imagining of a game by the same name created by Jervis Johnson in the 1990s.
- Space Hulk: Death Angel, The Card Game: the card game version of Space Hulk. Players cooperate as Space Marines in order to clear out the infestation of Genestealers on a derelict spaceship.
- Warhammer 40,000: Conquest: a Living Card Game where players control various factions of the Warhammer 40,000 setting in order to rule the sector.
- Forbidden Stars: a board game that pits four popular Warhammer 40,000 factions against one another to control objectives and secure the sector for themselves.
- Relic: an adaptation of the board game Talisman to the Warhammer: 40,000 setting.
- The Warhammer 40,000 Roleplay series of tabletop role-playing games, which share many core mechanics as well as the setting:
  - Dark Heresy: players may assume the roles of a cell of Inquisitorial acolytes, or assume a different and equally small-scale scenario following the game's rules. The recommended scenarios and ruleset present a balance between investigation and combat encounters.
  - Rogue Trader: players assume the roles of Explorers, whose rank and escalated privileges allow for travelling outside the Imperium's borders. Due to extensive expansions for Rogue Trader, campaigns can be largely different and altered by game masters. Its most significant difference from any of the other Warhammer 40,000 Roleplay titles is that it contains rules for capital spaceship design and space combat.
  - Deathwatch: the game allows players to role-play the Space Marines of the Adeptus Astartes, who are the gene-enhanced superhuman elite combat units of the Imperium of Man. In light of this, its ruleset heavily emphasises combat against difficult or numerically superior enemies, rather than negotiation and investigation, compared to Dark Heresy or Rogue Trader.
  - Black Crusade: Black Crusade allows players to role-play Chaos-corrupted characters. This instalment will be concluded with supplements. It is notably different in that it allows much more free-form character development, with experience costs being determined by affiliation with a Chaos God.
  - Only War: Only War puts players in the boots of the Imperial Guard, the foot soldiers of the Imperium of Man. Despite the human-level capabilities of the characters, it also emphasises combat over interaction, much like Deathwatch.

Following the termination of Games Workshop's licensing agreement with Fantasy Flight Games in 2017, the Warhammer 40,000 role-playing game license was acquired by German publisher Ulisses Spiele (also known for its work on The Dark Eye), which developed and published Wrath & Glory in 2018. In 2019, responsibility for Wrath & Glory was transferred to Cubicle 7, which continued support for the game and later published Imperium Maledictum.

- Wrath And Glory: allows players to assume the roles of a wide variety of characters from across the Warhammer 40,000 setting, including Imperial citizens, Space Marines, Aeldari, Orks, and agents of Chaos. Unlike previous Warhammer 40,000 Roleplay games, it uses a tier-based system that supports campaigns ranging from local investigations and survival to galaxy-spanning conflicts, with an emphasis on flexible party composition and cinematic action.
- Imperium Maledictum: allows players to role-play agents serving a powerful Imperial patron, with an emphasis on investigation, intrigue, and survival within the Imperium of Man. The game has been described by both its publisher and reviewers as a spiritual successor to Dark Heresy.

Games from other publishers include:

- Risk: Warhammer 40,000: This is a Warhammer 40,000-themed variant of the board game Risk, published by The OP.
- Monopoly: Warhammer 40,000: A Warhammer 40,000-themed version of the board game Monopoly, published by The OP.
- Munchkin Warhammer 40,000: a Warhammer 40,000-themed edition of Munchkin, released in 2019 by Steve Jackson Games.
- Magic: the Gathering Universes Beyond: Warhammer 40,000 collaboration: A series of Warhammer 40,000-themed pre-constructed decks and limited edition collections of Magic: The Gathering.

=== TV ===
In July 2019, Games Workshop and Big Light Productions announced the development of a live-action TV series based on the character Gregor Eisenhorn, who is an Imperial Inquisitor. Frank Spotnitz was to be the showrunner for the series. The series was expected to be based on the novels written by Dan Abnett.

In August 2021, Games Workshop released the animated series Hammer and Bolter on the Warhammer+ streaming service. Each of the 15 half-hour episodes focused on a specific faction from the 40k universe, including the Imperium of Man, Chaos Space Marines, Orks, Tyranids, and Necrons.

In March 2022, Games Workshop released the micro series The Exodite on the Warhammer+ streaming service. The Exodite follows the struggle of a T'au Empire expeditionary force to bring the Greater Good to a new planet.

Warhammer 40,000 animations include:

- Hammer and Bolter released on August 21, 2021.
- Angels of Death released on Nov 25, 2021.
- The Exodite released on March 21, 2022.
- Interrogator released on April 18, 2022.
- Iron Within released on March 1, 2023.
- Pariah Nexus released on September 13, 2023.
- Broken Lance released on March 13, 2024.
- The Tithes released on August 21, 2024.
- Adepta Sororitas Penitence released on February 25, 2026.
- Aeronautica Imperialis released on May 29, 2026.

In December 2022, Amazon MGM Studios acquired the TV and film rights to the game after months of negotiations and fending off rival companies that also sought the rights. Vertigo Entertainment's Roy Lee and Natalie Viscuso worked with Henry Cavill to obtain the IP before taking it to Amazon Studios. Vertigo will executive produce with Games Workshop's Andy Smillie and Max Bottrill alongside Amazon MGM Studios. Henry Cavill will star and also serve as an executive producer of the series and further planned franchise. In July 2026, it was announced that Mike Flanagan would serve as a writer on the series.

In December 2024, the franchise was featured in Secret Level, a video game anthology series created by Tim Miller for Amazon Prime Video. The episode is titled "And they shall know no fear," a reference to the iconic line from the series. It takes place after the events of Space Marine 2, and follows Ultramarine lieutenant Demetrian Titus, the protagonist of the Space Marine games, on a mission to destroy a Chaos sorcerer. In August 2026, it was announced that an animated series based on the Secret Level episode was in development, with Dave Wilson and John Orloff creating the series, Wilson directing, Henry Cavill executive producing and Blur Studio providing the animation.

=== Film ===
In 2007 a fan film Damnatus: The Enemy Within was made, costing more than 10,000 euros, which took place in the Warhammer 40,000 universe. Games Workshop refused to give permission for the film to be shown.

In December 2010, Ultramarines: A Warhammer 40,000 Movie was released directly to DVD. It is a CGI science fiction film, based around the Ultramarines Chapter of Space Marines. The screenplay was written by Dan Abnett, a Games Workshop Black Library author. The film was produced by Codex Pictures, a UK-based company, under license from Games Workshop. It utilised animated facial capture technology from Image Metrics. It was received poorly.

=== Music ===
The album Realms of Chaos: Slaves to Darkness by British death metal band Bolt Thrower features lyrics as well as artwork based on the Warhammer and Warhammer 40,000 brands, with the album's title design being identical to that of the eponymous Games Workshop books.

In the early 1990s Games Workshop set up their own label, Warhammer Records. The band D-Rok were signed to this label; their only album, Oblivion, featured songs based on Warhammer 40,000.

The song "Chaos Space Marine" by British experimental rock band Black Country, New Road is named after the Chaos Space Marine in Warhammer 40,000.

== Reception ==
In Issue 35 of Challenge (1988), John A. Theisen said "If this were intended as a serious science-fiction game, my criticisms would be enormous. However, it is not; it is undeniably action-oriented science-fantasy. As a result, by openly acknowledging that it is a fantasy game set in the far future, any comments on internal consistency, suspension of disbelief, and game rationale can be thrown out the nearest window. This is basically cosmic hack-and-slash, not an extrapolation of future-history-yet-to-come. And if that's the way you like to play, this game is fun, fun, fun."

In Issue 12 of the French magazine Backstab (1998), Croc noted that the rules in the 3rd edition had been immensely simplified, saying, "It's clear, Games Workshop is trying to lower the age of its players even further. The rules of WH40K are much simpler than previous ones, really bringing this edition closer to Space Marine. Units fire together, not figure by figure. No more alerting, no more hiding." His only complaint with the game was the sculpting of the Dark Eldar figurines, which he called, "ugly and badly sculpted, I don't know where they got the sculptor who did this but he should buy some glasses." Croc concluded by only giving the Dark Eldar figurines a rating of 5 out of 10, but giving the overall game 7 out of 10, saying, "It's a real treat for both old and new players."

Ken Carpenter reviewed the second edition of Warhammer 40,000 in White Wolf #44 (June, 1994), rating it a 4 out of 5 and stated that "WH40K is [...] a perfect game for beginners to miniatures gaming because of its low initial investment [...] WH40K is a colorful, visual way to represent battles in a dark future."

== Awards ==
Warhammer 40,000 2nd Edition won the 1993 Origins Award for Best Miniatures Rules.

In 2004, Warhammer 40,000 was inducted into the Origins Hall of Fame.

Warhammer 40,000 8th Edition won the 2017 Origins Awards for Best Miniatures Game and Fan Favorite Miniatures Game.

== See also ==
- Grimdark Future
- List of Warhammer 40,000 publications
