= Rogue Trader (role-playing game) =

Tabletop role-playing game

- Publishers: Fantasy Flight Games (2008-2017); Cubicle 7 (2017-present)
- Publication: 2009
- Genres: Science Fantasy

Rogue Trader is a Science-fiction role-playing game published in 2009 that uses the Warhammer 40,000 Roleplay system.

In 2023, the game received a Role-playing video game adaptation in the form of Warhammer 40,000: Rogue Trader.

== Description ==
In Rogue Trader (2009), the player characters are important members of ship crews in interstellar trade and exploration, often encountering xenos.

=== Gameplay ===
In Rogue Trader, players take the role of a Rogue Trader and their crew as they operate outside the stellar and legal boundaries of the Imperium. The book provides, among other things, rules for interplanetary commerce and spaceship operation, travel, combat, and customization.

=== Career paths ===
In Rogue Trader, one player typically takes the Rogue Trader career path, representing a ship captain who has been granted a warrant to explore and trade outside the limits of the Imperium of Man. The other players act as members of their crew. Other career paths include:

- Arch-Militant - A combat expert.
- Astropath Transcendent - Like the Psyker, someone with psychic powers, using them to communicate over interstellar distances.
- Explorator - A Tech-Priest tasked by the Adeptus Mechanicus to rediscover lost science and technology.
- Missionary - A cleric of the God-Emperor, spreading the word of their religion into the dark corners of the Galaxy.
- Navigator - Another psychic, but one whose skills lie in directing the ship itself on interstellar voyages, relying on the psionic beacon at the heart of the Imperium.
- Seneschal - The Rogue Trader's right-hand person, running their trading enterprise.
- Void-master - Expert in running a space ship.
- Kroot Mercenary - from the Into the Storm sourcebook.
- Ork Freebooter - from the Into the Storm sourcebook.
- Kabalite Warrior - from the Soul Reaver adventure.
- Wych - from the Soul Reaver adventure.
- Ork Weirdboy - this new career for Ork is added in "Navis Primer".
- Tau Fire Warrior - this career added in "Tau Character Guide" for web-only "Twilight Crusade".

== Products ==
- Rogue Trader - Core Rulebook, including a pre-written adventure (ISBN 978-1589946750)
  - The Game Master's Kit - A game master's screen for Rogue Trader and a booklet that includes a pre-written adventure, an NPC starship generator and a star system generator
  - Lure of the Expanse - A sourcebook containing three adventures
  - Forsaken Bounty - A free preview adventure available for download on the Fantasy Flight Games web site
  - Dark Frontier - A free preview adventure available for download on the Fantasy Flight Games web site
  - Into the Storm - A sourcebook containing rules about creating alien ("xenos") player characters (Kroot and Ork species), vehicles and gear
  - Edge of the Abyss - A sourcebook containing descriptions of the worlds of the Koronus expanse, Rogue Trader's main setting
  - The Frozen Reaches - Part 1 of the 3 part The Warpstorm Trilogy campaign
  - Citadel of Skulls - Part 2 of the 3 part The Warpstorm Trilogy campaign
  - Fallen Suns - Part 3 of the 3 part The Warpstorm Trilogy campaign
  - Battlefleet Koronus - A sourcebook covering starships, including the history of the Imperial Navy
  - Hostile Acquisitions - a supplement, expanding on career paths with a distinctly "scoundrel" feel to them, as well as additional rules on making enemies with a Nemesis Origin path. Provides stats and rules to play on the other side of Imperial Law
  - The Koronus Bestiary - a supplement for Rogue Trader, is a detailed compendium of deadly beasts, hostile xenos, unholy daemons, and other dangers that fill the uncharted regions of the Koronus Expanse
  - The Soul Reaver - a sourcebook on Dark Eldar in the Koronus Expanse, including an adventure campaign about a Dark Eldar city in the Webway and rules for creating Dark Eldar player characters
  - The Navis Primer - a sourcebook covering warp related aspects of the game with an emphasis on astropaths and navigators, as well as alternate career ranks
  - Stars of Inequity - A supplement focusing on the worlds of the Koronus Expanse
  - Faith and Coin - A supplement that focuses on cooperation of Explorers and Ecclesiarchy

== Development ==
On 20 February 2009, Fantasy Flight Games announced Rogue Trader, an addition to the WH40K roleplaying milieu. The initial limited release sold out at the Gen Con 2009 event before a wider release to stores in October 2009.

Fantasy Flight Games lost the Warhammer 40,000 license in 2016, but in 2018 the Black Library released Rogue Trader: The Omnibus, a compilation of three novels and two short stories by Andy Hoare.

Rogue Trader was subsequently published by Cubicle 7.
