= List of Warhammer 40,000 publications =

This is a list of supplements published for the Warhammer 40,000 tabletop miniatures wargame.

== First edition (Warhammer 40,000: Rogue Trader) (1987) ==
- Warhammer 40,000: Rogue Trader (1987)

== Second edition (1993) ==
- Codex: Imperial Guard (1995)
- Codex: Angels of Death (1996)

== Third edition (1998) ==
- Codex – Blood Angels (1998)
- Codex – Chaos Space Marines (1999)
- Codex – Space Wolves (2000)
- Codex – Tyranids (2001)
- Warhammer 40,000: Chapter Approved (2001)
- Warhammer 40,000: Codex Battlezone – Cityfight (2001)
- Warhammer 40,000: Imperial Armour II (2001)
- Warhammer 40,000: Codex – Necrons (2002)
- Codex – Witch Hunters (2003)
- Warhammer 40,000: Codex – Daemonhunters (2003)
- Warhammer 40,000: Codex – Eye of Terror (2003)
- Warhammer 40,000: Codex – Imperial Guard (2003)

== Fifth edition (2008) ==
- Warhammer 40,000: Codex – Imperial Guard

== See also ==
- Codex (Warhammer 40,000)
- Imperial Armour
