= HeroQuest (disambiguation) =

HeroQuest is an adventure board game by Milton Bradley and Games Workshop.

HeroQuest or Hero's Quest may also refer to:

- HeroQuest (video game), a computer game adaptation of the board game
- HeroQuest (role-playing game), formerly Hero Wars, rebranded Questworlds in 2020
- Hero's Quest, the original title of the 1989 video game Quest for Glory: So You Want to Be a Hero

== See also ==
- Advanced Heroquest, a Games Workshop-produced sequel to the board game
- HeroQuest II: Legacy of Sorasil, a sequel to the first computer game
