= Codex (Warhammer 40,000) =

Warhammer 40,000 rules supplement

Example early 3rd edition Codex (Imperial Guard) Each codex had its own lettering style for the title.

Example late 3rd edition Codex (Imperial Guard) All of these longer codices had a standard black border and common title style.

Example 6th edition Codex (Space Marines) All codices had a standard grey name and the word codex. Early 7th Edition codices continued this styling.

Example Late 7th edition Codex (Dark Angels) These codices had a standard white name with their faction type.

Example 8th edition Codex (Space Marines) All codices have a standard grey title and border.

A codex (pluralized as codexes by Games Workshop), in the Warhammer 40,000 tabletop wargame, is a rules supplement containing information concerning a particular army, environment, or worldwide campaign.

Codices for particular armies were introduced for the second edition of the game. The third edition rendered these obsolete, and a new series began, including introducing codices for battle zones and campaigns. Until superseded by newer versions, the 3rd edition and later codices remained valid for the newer editions of Warhammer 40,000. Games Workshop no longer produce campaign or battle zone codices, instead releasing 'expansions'. 'Codex' is now a term solely used for army books.

At the launch of 8th edition all previous codices were replaced with index books due to a major rules overhaul (as of November 2019 these indices are no longer produced). The indices were subsequently replaced by a new series of codices. As before, these codices remained valid until superseded by newer versions.

The format of the codices has varied somewhat over the years. The most common elements between iterations include:

- Background - Information about the force and its place in the Warhammer 40,000 universe. This includes artwork, short stories, and copies of fictional documents from the future.
- Miniature Showcase - Originally a hobby section providing information on collecting, building and painting an army. Later a selection of photographs of Citadel Miniatures painted by Games Workshop's 'Eavy Metal team.
- Rules - Delivered in varying forms between editions. In earlier editions: a bestiary (descriptions of units, characters and vehicles with special rules and background information), alongside an army list (providing options and points costs for units in the bestiary). Since 7th edition, rules for each unit have been delivered on a datasheet (a concise page detailing all stats, equipment, options and special rules for a unit). All other army rules and points are listed separately in sections before and after the datasheets.

Codex supplements provide additional rules for sub-factions of a parent army. These might include special characters or units and other special rules that are only available to that particular sub-faction.

Rules for models produced by Forgeworld are available as part of the Imperial Armour series of books, also published by Forgeworld. Rules for models no longer supported by codices and supplements can be found in Warhammer Legends on the Warhammer Community website.

== Current Books ==
=== Army Codices ===
The range of codices is regularly updated with new editions of armies and occasionally new army codices. Codices designed for a prior edition of Warhammer 40,000 are still valid in the current edition, unless a later version has replaced it. Codex Supplements have their parent faction noted in brackets.

==== 11th Edition ====
11th Edition was released in June 2026.

Codex	ISBN	Release date	Number of Pages
Space Marines		October 2026	232
Adeptus Custodes		October 2026	120
Orks		September 2026	176

==== 10th Edition ====
10th Edition was released in June 2023.

Codex	ISBN	Release date	Number of Pages
Tyranids	978-1-80457-231-3	September 2023	120
Adeptus Mechanicus	1-80457-278-0	November 2023	120
Necrons	1-80457-287-X	November 2023	136
T'au	1-80457-352-3	March 2024	136
Chaos Space Marines	1-80457-328-0	May 2024	160
Genestealer Cults	1-80457-388-4	June 2024	120
Adepta Sororitas	1-80457-396-5	June 2024	129
Imperial Agents	1-80457-411-2	August 2024	128
Aeldari	1-80457-492-9	February 2025	192
Astra Militarum	978-1-80457-476-8	February 2025	168
Emperor’s Children	978-1-80457-559-8	April 2025	112
World Eaters	978-1-80457-509-3	May 2025	112
Death Guard	978-1-80457-500-0	May 2025	128
Thousand Sons	978-1-80457-526-0	May 2025	120
Chaos Knights	978-1-80457-484-3	June 2025	104
Grey Knights		August 2025	104
Leagues of Votann		August 2025	144
Imperial Knights		September 2025	112
Drukhari		October 2025	136

Codex Supplement	ISBN	Release date	Number of Pages
Dark Angels (Space Marines)	1-80457-311-6	February 2024	96
Blood Angels (Space Marines)	1-80457-444-9	October 2024	104
Space Wolves (Space Marines)	1-80457-591-8	July 2025	104
Black Templars (Space Marines)		August 2025	96

=== Expansions ===
Expansions for Warhammer 40,000 provide alternative ways to play the game. Rules in expansions remain valid unless superseded by a newer publication.

==== 10th Edition ====
Book	Notes	ISBN	Release date
Crusade: Tyrannic War	Campaign Rules	1-80457-186-5	June 2023
Crusade: Pariah Nexus	Campaign Rules	1-80457-271-3	January 2024
Boarding Actions	Updated Boarding Actions material	978-1-80457-404-1	August 2024
Crusade: Armageddon	Campaign Rules	978-1-80457-599-4	June 2025

==== 9th Edition ====
Book	Notes	ISBN	Release date
Arks of Omen: Abaddon	Campaign & Boarding Actions Rules	1-83906-934-1	January 2023
Arks of Omen: Angron	Campaign & Boarding Actions Rules	1-80457-041-9	March 2023
Arks of Omen: Vashtorr	Campaign & Boarding Actions Rules	1-80457-090-7	March 2023
Arks of Omen: Farsight	Campaign & Boarding Actions Rules	1-80457-124-5	2023
Arks of Omen: The Lion	Campaign & Boarding Actions Rules	1-80457-140-7	2023

=== Imperial Armour ===
For main article see Imperial Armour

Imperial Armour is a series of official rules supplements to Warhammer 40,000 Codices produced by Forge World, a subsidiary company of Games Workshop. Current, valid books:

Imperial Armour	Notes	ISBN	Release date

== Obsolete Books ==
=== Codices ===
==== 10th Edition ====
10th Edition was released in June 2023.

Codex	ISBN	Release date	Superseded By
Space Marines	978-1-80457-238-2	September 16, 2023	11th Edition Codex: Space Marines
Adeptus Custodes	978-1-80457-336-5	April 2024	11th Edition Codex: Adeptus Custodes
Orks	1-80457-320-5	April 2024	11th Edition Codex: Orks

==== 9th Edition ====
9th Edition was released in July 2020. All codices were rendered obsolete by 10th edition Warhammer 40,000. 10th Edition was released June 2023. Codex Supplements have their parent faction noted in brackets.

Codex	ISBN	Release date	Superseded By
Necrons	978-1-83906-078-6	October 2020	10th Edition Index: Necrons
Space Marines	978-1-83906-069-4	October 2020	10th Edition Index: Space Marines
Death Guard	978-1-83906-137-0	January 2021	10th Edition Index: Death Guard
Drukhari	978-1-83906-189-9	March 2021	10th Edition Index: Drukhari
Adeptus Mechanicus	978-1-83906-323-7	May 2021	10th Edition Index: Adeptus Mechanicus
Adepta Sororitas	978-1-83906-339-8	June 2021	10th Edition Index: Adepta Sororitas
Grey Knights	978-1-83906-153-0	August 2021	10th Edition Index: Grey Knights
Thousand Sons	978-1-83906-145-5	August 2021	10th Edition Index: Thousand Sons
Orks	978-1-83906-347-3	September 2021	10th Edition Index: Orks
Adeptus Custodes	978-1-83906-384-8	January 2022	10th Edition Index: Adeptus Custodes
Genestealer Cults	978-1-83906-376-3	January 2022	10th Edition Index: Genestealer Cults
Tau Empire	978-1-83906-631-3	February 2022	10th Edition Index: T'au Empire
Aeldari	978-1-83906-578-1	March 2022	10th Edition Index: Aeldari
Tyranids	978-1-83906-615-3	April 2022	10th Edition Index: Tyranids
Chaos Knights	978-1-83906-599-6	May 2022	10th Edition Index: Knight Households
Imperial Knights	978-1-83906-607-8	May 2022	10th Edition Index: Knight Households
Chaos Space Marines	978-1-83906-806-5	July 2022	10th Edition Index: Chaos Space Marines
Chaos Daemons	978-1-83906-797-6	September 2022	10th Edition Index: Chaos Daemons
Leagues of Votann	978-1-83906-578-1	November 2022	10th Edition Index: Leagues of Votann
Astra Militarum	978-1-80457-081-4	November 2022	10th Edition Index: Astra Militarum
World Eaters	978-1-80457-049-4	February 2023	10th Edition Index: World Eaters

Codex Supplement	ISBN	Release date	Superseded By
Deathwatch (Space Marines)	978-1-83906-105-9	November 2020	10th Edition Index: Deathwatch
Space Wolves (Space Marines)	978-1-83906-113-4	November 2020	10th Edition Index: Space Wolves
Blood Angels (Space Marines)	978-1-83906-121-9	December 2020	10th Edition Index: Blood Angels
Dark Angels (Space Marines)	978-1-83906-129-5	January 2021	10th Edition Index: Dark Angels
Black Templars (Space Marines)	978-1-83906-449-4	November 2021	10th Edition Index: Black Templars

==== 8th Edition ====
8th Edition was released June 2017.

Codex	ISBN	Release date	Superseded By
Adeptus Custodes	978-1-78826-135-7	February 2018	9th Edition Codex: Adeptus Custodes
Adepta Sororitas	978-1-78826-686-4	November 2019	9th Edition Codex: Adepta Sororitas
Adeptus Mechanicus	978-1-78826-017-6	September 2017	9th Edition Codex: Adeptus Mechanicus
Astra Militarum	978-1-78826-028-2	October 2017	9th Edition Codex: Astra Militarum
Blood Angels	978-1-78826-050-3	December 2017	9th Edition Codex: Space Marines
Chaos Daemons	978-1-78826-123-4	January 2018	9th Edition Codex: Chaos Daemons
Chaos Knights	978-1-78826-612-3	July 2019	9th Edition Codex: Chaos Knights
Chaos Space Marines	978-1-78581-938-4	August 2017	8th Edition Codex: Chaos Space Marines (2nd Edition)
Chaos Space Marines (2nd Edition)	978-1-78826-467-9	March 2019	9th Edition Codex: Chaos Space Marines
Craftworlds	978-1-78826-033-6	November 2017	9th Edition Codex: Aeldari
Dark Angels	978-1-78826-055-8	December 2017	9th Edition Codex: Space Marines
Death Guard	978-1-78826-005-3	September 2017	9th Edition Codex: Death Guard
Deathwatch	978-1-78826-185-2	May 2018	9th Edition Codex: Space Marines
Drukhari	978-1-78826-170-8	April 2018	9th Edition Codex: Drukhari
Elucidian Starstriders	—N/a	September 2018	10th Edition Index: Imperial Agents
Gellerpox Infected	—N/a	September 2018	N/A
Genestealer Cults	978-1-78826-396-2	February 2019	9th Edition Codex: Genestealer Cults
Grey Knights	978-1-78581-927-8	August 2017	9th Edition Codex: Grey Knights
Harlequins	978-1-78826-213-2	May 2018	9th Edition Codex: Aeldari
Imperial Knights	978-1-78826-164-7	June 2018	9th Edition Codex: Imperial Knights
Necrons	978-1-78581-966-7	April 2018	9th Edition Codex: Necrons
Orks	978-1-78826-262-0	November 2018	9th Edition Codex: Orks
Space Marines	978-1-78581-949-0	August 2017	8th Edition Codex: Space Marines (2nd Edition)
Space Marines (2nd Edition)	978-1-78826-630-7	August 2019	9th Edition Codex: Space Marines
Space Wolves	978-1-78826-060-2	September 2018	9th Edition Codex: Space Marines
Tau Empire	978-1-78826-158-6	March 2018	9th Edition Codex: Tau Empire
Thousand Sons	978-1-78826-141-8	February 2018	9th Edition Codex: Thousand Sons
Tyranids	978-1-78826-038-1	November 2017	9th Edition Codex: Tyranids

Codex Supplement	ISBN	Release date	Superseded By
Imperial Fists (Space Marines)	978-1-78826-672-7	October 2019	10th Edition Index: Space Marines
Iron Hands (Space Marines)	978-1-78826-658-1	September 2019	10th Edition Index: Space Marines
Ravenguard (Space Marines)	978-1-78826-651-2	September 2019	10th Edition Index: Space Marines
Salamanders (Space Marines)	978-1-78826-679-6	October 2019	10th Edition Index: Space Marines
Ultramarines (Space Marines)	978-1-78826-637-6	August 2019	10th Edition Index: Space Marines
White Scars (Space Marines)	978-1-78826-644-4	August 2019	10th Edition Index: Space Marines

Index	Factions	ISBN	Release date	Superseded By
Chaos	Heretic Astartes, Chaos Daemons & Questor Traitoris	978-1-78581-865-3	June 2017	8th Edition Chaos codexes (Note: 8th Edition Codex: Chaos Space Marines, Codex: Death Guard, Codex: Thousand Sons, Codex: Chaos Daemons, Index: Renegade Knights)
Imperium 1	Space Marines, Blood Angels, Dark Angels, Space Wolves, Grey Knights, Deathwatch & Legion of the Damned	978-1-78581-906-3	June 2017	8th Edition Imperium codexes (Note: 8th Edition Codex: Space Marines, Codex: Blood Angels, Codex: Dark Angels, Codex: Space Wolves, Codex: Grey Knights, & Codex: Deathwatch)
Imperium 2	Astra Militarum, Adeptus Mechanicus, Imperial Knights, Imperial Agents & Talons of the Emperor	978-1-78581-913-1	June 2017	8th Edition Imperium codexes (Note: 8th Edition Codex: Astra Militarum, Codex: Adeptus Mechanicus, Codex: Imperial Knights, Codex: Adepta Sororitas, Codex: Adeptus Custodes & Index Imperialis Articles)
Xenos 1	Craftworlds, Drukhari, Ynnari, Harlequins & Necrons	978-1-78581-899-8	June 2017	8th Edition Xenos codexes (Note: 8th Edition Codex: Craftworlds, Codex: Drukhari, Index: Xenos - Ynnari, Codex: Harlequins, & Codex: Necrons)
Xenos 2	Orks, Tau Empire, Tyranids & Genestealer Cults	978-1-78581-892-9	June 2017	8th Edition Xenos codexes (Note: 8th Edition Codex: Orks, Codex: Tau Empire, Codex: Tyranids, & Codex: Genestealer Cults)

==== 7th Edition ====
All codices were rendered obsolete by 8th edition Warhammer 40,000. 7th Edition was released May 2014. Codex Supplements have their parent faction noted in brackets.

Codex	ISBN	Release date	Superseded By
Blood Angels	978-1-78253-612-3	December 2014	8th Edition Index: Imperium 1
Cult Mechanicus	978-1-78253-742-7	May 2015	8th Edition Index: Imperium 2
Craftworlds	978-1-78253-730-4	April 2015	8th Edition Index: Xenos 1
Dark Angels	978-1-78253-752-6	June 2015	8th Edition Index: Imperium 1
Dark Eldar	978-1-78253-483-9	October 2014	8th Edition Index: Xenos 1
Deathwatch	978-1-78581-156-2	August 2016	8th Edition Index: Imperium 1
Genestealer Cults	978-1-78581-271-2	October 2016	8th Edition Index: Xenos 2
Grey Knights	978-1-78253-370-2	August 2014	8th Edition Index: Imperium 1
Harlequins	978-1-78253-683-3	February 2015	8th Edition Index: Xenos 1
Imperial Agents	978-1-78581-802-8	December 2016	8th Edition Index: Imperium 1 & 2
Imperial Knights	978-1-78253-734-2	May 2015	8th Edition Index: Imperium 2
Khorne Daemonkin	978-1-78253-726-7	March 2015	8th Edition Index: Chaos
Necrons	978-1-78253-607-9	January 2015	8th Edition Index: Xenos 1
Orks	978-1-78253-329-0	June 2014	8th Edition Index: Xenos 2
Skitarii	978-1-78253-738-0	April 2015	8th Edition Index: Imperium 2
Space Marines	978-1-78253-747-2	June 2015	8th Edition Index: Imperium 1
Space Wolves	978-1-78253-381-8	August 2014	8th Edition Index: Imperium 1
Tau Empire	978-1-78581-009-1	October 2015	8th Edition Index: Xenos 2

Codex Supplement	ISBN	Release date	Superseded By
Angels of Death (Space Marines)	978-1-78581-695-6	April 2016	8th Edition
Black Legion (Chaos Space Marines)	978-1-78581-705-2	April 2016	8th Edition
Cadia (Astra Militarum)	Digital Only	January 2016	8th Edition
Champions of Fenris (Space Wolves)	978-1-78253-399-3	August 2014	8th Edition
Clan Raukaan (Space Marines)	Digital Only	June 2015	8th Edition
Crimson Slaughter (Chaos Space Marines)	978-1-78581-696-3	April 2016	8th Edition
Farsight Enclaves (Tau Empire)	978-1-78581-689-5	February 2016	8th Edition
Flesh Tearers (Blood Angels)	Digital Only	January 2016	8th Edition
Haemonculus Covens (Dark Eldar)	978-1-78253-493-8	October 2014	8th Edition
Raven Guard (Space Marines)	Digital Only	January 2016	8th Edition
Sentinels of Terra (Space Marines)	Digital Only	June 2015	8th Edition
Traitor Legions (Chaos Space Marines)	978-1-78581-794-6	December 2016	8th Edition
Waaagh! Ghazghkull (Orks)	978-1-78253-460-0	July 2014	7th Edition Reprint
Waaagh! Ghazghkull (Orks) Reprint	978-1-78581-690-1	February 2016	8th Edition
White Scars (Space Marines)	Digital Only	January 2016	8th Edition

==== 6th Edition ====
6th Edition was released June 2012. Codex Supplements have their parent faction noted in brackets.

Codex	ISBN	Release date	Superseded By
Adepta Sororitas	978-1-78253-360-3	October 2013	8th Edition Index: Imperium 2
Astra Militarum	978-1-78253-259-0	April 2014	8th Edition Index: Imperium 2
Chaos Daemons	978-1-908872-88-3	March 2013	8th Edition Index: Chaos
Chaos Space Marines	978-1-908872-02-9	October 2012	8th Edition Index: Chaos
Dark Angels	978-1-908872-26-5	January 2013	7th Edition Codex: Dark Angels
Eldar	978-1-78253-019-0	June 2013	7th Edition Codex: Craftworlds
Imperial Knights	978-1-78253-245-3	March 2014	7th Edition Codex: Imperial Knights
Inquisition	978-1-78253-404-4	November 2013	8th Edition Index: Imperium 2
Legion of the Damned	978-1-78253-526-3	February 2014	8th Edition Index: Imperium 1
Militarum Tempestus	978-1-78253-304-7	Mars 2014	8th Edition Index: Imperium 2
Space Marines	978-1-78253-076-3	September 2013	7th Edition Codex: Space Marines
Tau Empire	978-1-78253-003-9	April 2013	7th Edition Codex: Tau Empire
Tyranids	978-1-78253-195-1	January 2014	8th Edition Index: Xenos 2

Codex Supplement	ISBN	Release date	Superseded By
Black Legion (Chaos Space Marines)	978-1-78253-301-6	August 2013	7th Edition Revised Version
Clan Raukaan (Space Marines)	978-1-78253-406-8	November 2013	7th Edition Revised Version
Crimson Slaughter (Chaos Space Marines)	978-1-78253-310-8	March 2014	7th Edition Revised Version
Farsight Enclaves (Tau Empire)	978-1-78253-222-4	July 2013	7th Edition Revised Version
Iyanden (Eldar)	978-1-78253-107-4	June 2013	7th Edition Codex: Craftworlds
Sentinels of Terra (Space Marines)	978-1-78253-365-8	November 2013	7th Edition Revised Version

==== 5th Edition ====
5th Edition was released in 2008.

Codex	ISBN	Release date	Superseded By
Blood Angels	978-1-84154-960-6	April 2010	7th Edition Codex: Blood Angels
Dark Eldar	978-1-84154-978-1	November 2010	7th Edition Codex: Dark Eldar
Grey Knights	978-1-84154-991-0	April 2011	7th Edition Codex: Grey Knights
Imperial Guard	978-1-84154-923-1	May 2009	6th Edition Codex: Astra Militarum
Necrons	978-1-907964-18-3	November 2011	7th Edition Codex: Necrons
Sisters of Battle	N/A - White Dwarf	August/September 2011	6th Edition Codex: Adepta Sororitas (iBook)
Space Marines	978-1-84154-894-4	October 2008	6th Edition Codex: Space Marines
Space Wolves	978-1-84154-939-2	October 2009	7th Edition Codex: Space Wolves
Tyranids	978-1-84154-951-4	January 2010	6th Edition Codex: Tyranids

==== 4th Edition ====
4th Edition was released in 2004. Codex Supplements have their parent faction noted in brackets.

Codex	ISBN	Release date	Superseded By
Black Templars	1-84154-685-2	November 2005	6th Edition Codex: Space Marines
Blood Angels (Note: Presented in two parts in White Dwarf issues #330 and #331, and subsequently available online from the Games Workshop website, with long-term plan to publish this list in a new book.)	N/A - White Dwarf	June/July 2007	5th Edition Codex: Blood Angels
Chaos Daemons	978-1-84154-879-1	May 2008	6th Edition Codex: Chaos Daemons
Chaos Space Marines	978-1-84154-842-5	September 2007	6th Edition Codex: Chaos Space Marines
Dark Angels	1-84154-807-3	March 2007	6th Edition Codex: Dark Angels
Eldar	1-84154-791-3	November 2006	6th Edition Codex: Eldar
Orks	978-1-84154-852-4	January 2008	7th Edition Codex: Orks
Space Marines	1-84154-526-0	November 2004	5th Edition Codex: Space Marines
Tau Empire	1-84154-712-3	March 2006	6th Edition Codex: Tau Empire
Tyranids	1-84154-650-X	June 2005	5th Edition Codex: Tyranids

Codex Supplement	ISBN	Release date	Superseded By
Catachans (Imperial Guard)	1-84154-016-1	2005	5th Edition Codex: Imperial Guard

==== 3rd Edition ====
3rd Edition was released in 1998. Codex Supplements have their parent faction noted in brackets.

Codex	ISBN	Release date	Superseded By
Chaos Space Marines	1-869893-49-2	February 1999	3rd Edition Codex (2nd Edition)
Chaos Space Marines (2nd Edition)	1-84154-322-5	October 2002	4th Edition Codex
Daemonhunters	1-84154-361-6	March 2003	5th Edition Codex: Grey Knights
Dark Eldar	1-869893-41-7	November 1998	3rd Edition Codex (2nd Edition)
Dark Eldar (2nd Edition)	1-84154-307-1	November 2003	5th Edition Codex
Eldar	1-869893-39-5	August 1999	4th Edition Codex
Imperial Guard	1-869893-52-2	November 1999	3rd Edition Codex (2nd Edition)
Imperial Guard (2nd Edition)	1-84154-410-8	September 2003	5th Edition Codex
Necrons	1-84154-190-7	July 2002	5th Edition Codex
Orks	1-869893-38-7	July 1999	4th Edition Codex
Space Marines	1-869893-28-X	October 1998	4th Edition Codex
Tyranids	1-84154-013-7	February 2001	4th Edition Codex
Tau	1-84154-098-6	October 2001	4th Edition Codex: Tau Empire
Witch Hunters	1-84154-485-X	April 2004	5th Edition Codex: Sisters of Battle (White Dwarf)

Codex Supplement	ISBN	Release date	Superseded By
Assassins	1-84154-019-6	July 1999	Codex: Daemonhunters / Witch Hunters
Blood Angels (Space Marines)	1-869893-45-X	December 1998	4th Edition Codex (White Dwarf)
Catachans (Imperial Guard)	1-84154-016-1	February 2000	4th Edition Codex (free download)
Craftworld Eldar (Eldar)	1-84154-029-3	June 2000	4th Edition Codex: Eldar
Dark Angels (Space Marines)	1-869893-67-0	May 1999	3rd Edition Codex (2nd Edition)
Dark Angels (2nd Edition) (Space Marines)	1-84154-302-0	Nov 2002	4th Edition Codex
Space Wolves (Space Marines)	1-84154-010-2	April 2000	5th Edition Codex

==== 2nd Edition ====
All codices were rendered obsolete by 3rd Edition Warhammer 40,000. 2nd Edition was released in 1993.

Codex	ISBN	Release date
Angels of Death (Note: Covers rules for both Dark Angels and Blood Angels.)	1-872372-96-1	January 1996
Chaos	1-872372-47-3	July 1996
Eldar	1-872372-74-0	April 1994
Imperial Guard	1-872372-92-9	November 1995
Orks	1-872372-76-7	July 1994
Sisters of Battle	1-872372-14-7	August 1997
Tyranids (Note: Covers rules for both Tyranids and Genestealer Cults.)	1-872372-90-2	August 1995
Ultramarines (Note: Also covers rules for other "standard" Space Marine armies.)	1-872372-87-2	April 1995
Space Wolves	1-872372-71-6	January 1994

Codex Supplement	ISBN	Release date
Assassins	1-872372-05-8	December 1997

=== Expansions/Supplements ===
Example 4th edition expansion (Apocalypse) This style was carried over onto 5th edition expansions.

==== 9th Edition ====
All 9th Edition expansions were superseded by 10th Edition, with the exception of the Arks of Omen "Boarding Actions" rules.

Book	Notes	ISBN	Release date
War Zone Charadon Act 1: The Book of Rust	Campaign & Death Guard, Adeptus Mechanicus, Imperial Knights, Chaos Knights, Drukhari Rules	978-1-83906-315-2	January 2021
War Zone Charadon Act 2: The Book of Fire	Campaign & Adeptus Mechanicus, Adeptus Sororitas, Be'lakor, Chaos Space Marines Rules	978-1-83906-331-2	July 2021
War Zone Octarius Book 1: Rising Tide	Campaign & Astra Militarum, Deathwatch, Fortification, Inquisition, Tyranids Rules	Unknown	October 2021
War Zone Octarius Book 2: Critical Mass	Campaign & Astra Cartographica, Orks Rules	Unknown	November 2021

==== 8th Edition ====
Book	Notes	ISBN	Release date	Superseded By
Warhammer 40,000	Core rulebook	978-1-78581-849-3	June 2017	9th Edition
Chapter Approved: 2017 Edition	Annual rules update	978-1-78826-043-5	December 2017	9th Edition
Chapter Approved: 2018 Edition	Annual rules update	978-1-78826-373-3	December 2018	9th Edition
Chapter Approved: 2019 Edition	Annual rules update	978-1-78826-757-1	December 2019	9th Edition
Imperium Nihilus: Vigilus Defiant	Campaign & Ultramarines Rules	978-1-78826-381-8	December 2018	
Imperium Nihilus: Vigilus Ablaze	Campaign & Black Legion Rules	978-1-78826-461-7	April 2019	
Psychic Awakening: Phoenix Rising	Craftworlds, Drukhari & Index: Ynnari	978-1-78826-713-7	October 2019	
Psychic Awakening: Faith & Fury	Chaos Space Marines & Space Marines	978-1-78826-725-0	November 2019	
Psychic Awakening: Blood of Baal	Blood Angels & Tyranids	978-1-78826-743-4	December 2019	
Psychic Awakening: Ritual of the Damned	Dark Angels, Grey Knights & Thousand Sons	978-1-78826-764-9	January 2020	
Psychic Awakening: The Greater Good	Tau, Astra Militarum & Genestealer Cults	978-1-78826-771-7	February 2020	
Psychic Awakening: Saga of the Beast	Space Wolves & Orks	978-1-78826-734-2	March 2020	
Psychic Awakening: Engine War	Adeptus Mechanicus, Imperial Knights, Chaos Knights & Chaos Daemons	978-1-78826-778-6	June 2020	
Psychic Awakening: War of the Spider	Adeptus Custodes, Sisters of Silence, Assassins, Death Guard & Agents of Bile	978-1-78826-806-6	June 2020	
Psychic Awakening: Pariah	Adepta Sororitas, Necrons & Index: Inquisition	978-1-78826-813-4	July 2020	

==== 7th Edition ====
All 7th Edition expansions were superseded by 8th Edition.

Book	Notes	ISBN	Release date
Black Crusade: Angel's Blade	Blood Angels Update	978-1-78581-718-2	September 2016
Black Crusade: Traitor's Hate	Chaos Space Marines Update	978-1-78581-263-7	September 2016
Blood Oath	Warhammer World Campaign	978-1-78572-118-2	May 2015
Death from the Skies	Expanded Rules for Flyers	978-1-78581-096-1	May 2016
Death Masque	Deathwatch vs Harlequins	N/A - Boxset	August 2016
Gathering Storm: Fall of Cadia	Narrative Campaign of Fall of Cadia	978-1-78581-763-2	January 2017
Gathering Storm: Fracture of Biel-tan	Narrative Campaign	978-1-78581-773-1	February 2017
Gathering Storm: Rise of the Primarch	Narrative Campaign	978-1-78581-785-4	March 2017
Kill Team	Small Skirmish Games	N/A - Boxset	September 2016
Path to Glory	Campaign	Digital Edition	December 2015
Planetary Onslaught	Planetstrike, Cities of Death Compendium	978-1-78581-752-6	November 2016
Planetstrike	Sanctus Reach Planetstrike Compendium	Digital Edition	September 2014
Sanctus Reach: Hour of the Wolf	Planetrike Missions and Space Wolves	978-1-78253-421-1	August 2014
Sanctus Reach: The Red Waaagh!	Planetstrike Rules and Orks	978-1-78253-337-5	July 2014
Sanctus Reach: Stormclaw	Space Wolves vs Orks	N/A - Boxset	July 2014
Shield of Baal: Deathstorm	Blood Angels vs Tyranids	N/A - Boxset	December 2014
Shield of Baal: Exterminatus	Blood Angels and Necrons Detachments	978-1-78253-625-3	December 2014
Shield of Baal: Leviathan	Cities of Death and Tyranids Update	978-1-78253-619-2	November 2014
War Zone Fenris: Curse of the Wulfen	Space Wolves and Daemons Updates	978-1-78581-067-1	February 2016
War Zone Fenris: Wrath of Magnus	Thousand Sons and Daemons Update	978-1-78581-760-1	December 2016
War Zone Damocles: Burning Dawn	Tau Empire	N/A - Boxset	November 2015
War Zone Damocles: Kauyon	Tau Empire and Space Marines Updates	978-1-78581-013-8	November 2015
War Zone Damocles: Mont'ka	Tau, Astra Militarum and Assassins Updates	978-1-78581-018-3	November 2015
War Zone Damocles: Operation Shadowtalon	Raven Guard	N/A - Boxset	November 2015

==== 6th Edition ====
Book	Notes	ISBN	Release date	Superseded By
Altar of War	Additional Battle Missions	Various Digital Releases	2012–2014	Discontinued
Apocalypse	Large-scale battles	978-1-78253-047-3	July 2013	8th Edition
Campaign: Crusade of Fire	Campaign and Additional Rules	978-1-908872-21-0	November 2012	Discontinued
Compendium: Altar of War	Additional Battle Missions	978-1-78253-599-7	April 2014	8th Edition
Compendium: Death from the Skies	Flier Rules Compendium	978-1-78253-065-7	February 2013	7th Edition SoB: Leviathan
Death Worlds	Digital Campaign	Digital Edition	June 2013	8th Edition
Escalation	Lords of War	978-1-78253-255-2	December 2013	8th Edition
Kill Team	Small Skirmish Games	Digital Edition	December 2013	7th Edition Kill Team
Stronghold Assault	Siege Warfare	978-1-78253-175-3	December 2013	Planetary Onslaught
Warzone: Damocles	Apocalypse Warzone	978-1-78253-235-4	March 2014	8th Edition
Warzone: Damnos	Apocalypse Warzone	978-1-78253-089-3	September 2013	8th Edition
Warzone: Pandorax	Apocalypse Warzone	978-1-78253-101-2	November 2013	8th Edition
Warzone: Valedor	Apocalypse Warzone	978-1-78253-205-7	May 2014	8th Edition

==== 5th Edition ====
Book	Notes	ISBN	Release date	Superseded By
Apocalypse Reload	Supplement to Apocalypse	978-1-84154-893-7	August 2008	6th Edition Apocalypse Book
Battle Missions	Additional Battle Scenarios	978-1-84154-911-8	March 2010	Eternal War, Maelstrom of War, Altar of War & Echoes of War
Death Worlds	Additional Battle Scenarios	N/A - White Dwarf	April 2012	Death Worlds - Digital 6th Edition
Planetary Empires	Map-based Campaigns	N/A - Boxset	August 2009	Discontinued Rules (Tiles Available)
Planetstrike	Planetary Invasions	978-1-84154-931-6	July 2009	7th Edition Sanctus Reach Campaign/Planetstrike
Spearhead	Mechanized Armies	N/A - White Dwarf	June 2010	7th Edition & Formations

==== 4th Edition ====
Book	Notes	ISBN	Release date	Superseded By
Apocalypse	Large-scale battles	1-84154-838-3	October 2007	6th Edition Apocalypse Book
Cities of Death	Urban Warfare	1-84154-749-2	June 2006	7th Edition Shield of Baal: Leviathan

==== 3rd Edition ====
===== Battlezone =====
Battlezone codices were rules supplements that dealt with a specialised combat environment, instead of an army. There was only ever one produced. However, material in Codex: Catachans provides rules for jungle warfare. The concept of a battlezone codex was replaced by Games Workshop's Expansions.

Codex	ISBN	Release date	Superseded By
Cityfight	1-84154-093-5	September 2001	4th edition expansion Cities of Death

===== 3rd Edition Events =====
The two event codices were released in association with the 2000 and 2003 Worldwide Campaigns. These codices provided background and special gaming rules for the event, along with four "supplemental army lists"; variant armies that required access to certain other codices for use.

Codex	Obsolete Army Lists	ISBN	Release date	Superseded By
Armageddon	Black Templars, Salamanders, Speed Freeks, Armageddon Imperial Guard	1-84154-045-5	August 2000	4th Edition Codex: Space Marines; Black Templars; Orks and 5th Edition Codex: Imperial Guard
Eye of Terror	Lost and the Damned, Ulthwé Strike Force, Cadian Shock Troops, 13th Company	1-84154-398-5	June 2003	4th Edition Codex: Eldar; Chaos Space Marines and 5th Edition Codex: Imperial Guard; Space Wolves

=== Imperial Armour ===
Imperial Armour	Notes	ISBN	Release date	Superseded by
Imperial Armour	Imperial Guard & Imperial Navy	1-84154-127-3	2000	Imperial Armour; Restarted Line
Imperial Armour II	Orks, Eldar, and Dark Eldar	1-84154-219-9	2001	Imperial Armour; Restarted Line
Imperial Armour Aeronautica	Update and compilation of fliers and anti-aircraft units for the 6th Edition release of Warhammer 40k	978-1-907964-95-4	July 2012	8th Edition
Imperial Armour Apocalypse	Companion volume to Warhammer 40,000 Apocalypse, containing new battle formations as well as new Apocalypse compatible game statistics for several Forge World models	978-1-84154-892-0	2007	Imperial Armour; Apocalypse (2nd Edition)
Imperial Armour Apocalypse (2nd Edition)	Companion volume to Warhammer 40,000 Apocalypse, containing new battle formations as well as new Apocalypse compatible game statistics for several Forge World models	978-1-907964-67-1	2011	Imperial Armour; Apocalypse (2013 Edition)
Imperial Armour Apocalypse (2013 Edition)	Companion volume to Warhammer 40,000 Apocalypse, containing new battle formations as well as new Apocalypse compatible game statistics for several Forge World models	978-1-78253-106-7	August 2013	8th Edition
Imperial Armour Apocalypse II	Companion volume to Warhammer 40,000 Apocalypse, containing new battle formations as well as new Apocalypse compatible game statistics for several Forge World models	978-1-84154-976-7	2009	Imperial Armour; Apocalypse (2013 Edition)
Imperial Armour Update	Rules for models for all races, stopgap measure until the release of the "Imperial Armour Volume x" books.	1-84154-355-1	2002	Imperial Armour; Restarted Line
Imperial Armour Update 2005	Rules for Forge World models not covered by the other volumes	1-84154-722-0	2005	Imperial Armour; Restarted Line
Imperial Armour Update 2006	Rules for Forge World models not covered by the other volumes	1-84154-818-9	2006	Imperial Armour; Restarted Line
Imperial Armour Volume 1: Imperial Guard & Imperial Navy	Imperial Guard & Imperial Navy	1-84154-421-3	2003	Imperial Armour 1 (2nd Edition)
Imperial Armour Volume 1: Imperial Guard (2nd Edition)	Imperial Guard	978-1-907964-08-4	December 2012	8th Edition
Imperial Armour Volume 2: Space Marines & Forces of the Inquisition	Space Marines & Forces of the Inquisition	1-84154-509-0	2004	Imperial Armour 2 (2nd Edition)
Imperial Armour Volume 2: War Machines of the Adeptus Astartes (2nd Edition)	Adepta Sororitas, Space Marines & Forces of the Inquisition	978-1-78253-302-3	December 2013	8th Edition
Imperial Armour Volume 3: The Taros Campaign	Tau, Imperial Guard & Space Marines	1-84154-708-5	2005	Imperial Armour 3 (2nd Edition)
Imperial Armour Volume 3: The Taros Campaign (2nd Edition)	Tau & Elysian Drop Troops	978-1-908872-79-1	June 2013	8th Edition
Imperial Armour Volume 4: The Anphelion Project	Tyranids, Imperial Guard & Space Marines	1-84154-784-0	2006	Imperial Armour 4 (2nd Edition)
Imperial Armour Volume 4: The Anphelion Project (2nd Edition)	Tyranids, Imperial Guard & Space Marines	978-1-78253-528-7	July 2014	8th Edition
Imperial Armour Volume 5: The Siege of Vraks (Part 1)	Death Korps of Krieg, Dark Angels & Chaos Renegades	978-1-84154-851-7	May 2007	Imperial Armour; The Siege of Vraks
Imperial Armour Volume 6: The Siege of Vraks (Part 2)	Death Korps of Krieg & Chaos Renegades	978-1-84154-910-1	August 2008	Imperial Armour; The Siege of Vraks
Imperial Armour Volume 7: The Siege of Vraks (Part 3)	Forces of the Inquisition & Chaos Renegades	978-1-84154-955-2	August 2009	Imperial Armour; The Siege of Vraks
Imperial Armour Volume 8: Raid on Kastorel-Novem	Elysian Drop Troop, Raven Guard & Orks	978-1-84154-977-4	May 2010	8th Edition
Imperial Armour Volume 9: The Badab War (Part 1)	The Tyrant's Legion	978-1-84154-995-8	2010	8th Edition
Imperial Armour Volume 10: The Badab War (Part 2)	Siege Vanguard Assault	978-1-907964-01-5	January 2011	8th Edition
Imperial Armour Volume 11: The Doom of Mymeara	Imperial Guard, Space Wolves & Eldar	978-1-907964-16-9	December 2011	Imperial Armour; The Doom of Mymeara
Imperial Armour Volume 12: The Fall of Orpheus	Necrons, Minotaurs & Death Korps of Krieg	978-1-908872-95-1	May 2013	8th Edition
Imperial Armour Volume 13: War Machines of the Lost and the Damned	Chaos Space Marines, Chaos Renegades & Chaos Daemons	978-1-78253-606-2	September 2014	8th Edition
Imperial Armour: The Doom of Mymeara	Imperial Guard, Space Wolves & Eldar	978-1-78253-970-4	2015	8th Edition
Imperial Armour: The Siege of Vraks	Death Korps of Krieg, Red Scorpions, Grey Knights, World Eaters & Chaos Renegades	978-1-78253-204-0	2015	8th Edition
Index: Forces of Chaos	All Chaos (except Chaos Astra Militarum)	978-1-78826-114-2	June 2017	Imperial Armour Compendium
Index: Forces of the Adeptus Astartes	All Adeptus Astartes	978-1-78826-115-9	June 2017	Imperial Armour Compendium
Index: Forces of the Astra Militarum	All Astra Militarum (both Imperial and Chaos) and Imperium	978-1-78826-116-6	June 2017	Imperial Armour Compendium
Index: Xenos	All Xenos	978-1-78826-117-3	June 2017	Imperial Armour Compendium
Imperial Armour Compendium	Adeptus Custodes, Adeptus Mechanicus, Astra Militarum, Chaos Daemons, Chaos Knights, Chaos Space Marines, Craftworlds, Death Guard, Drukhari, Grey Knights, Imperial Knights, The Inquisition, Necrons, Orks, Space Marines, T’au Empire, Tyranids	978-1-83906-104-2	November 2020	
