= Datasheet (Warhammer 40,000) =

A datasheet is the means by which Games Workshop creates rules for a model or unit of Citadel Miniatures from the Warhammer 40,000 range. These are normally contained in either a faction's Codex or a more generalised Index book. Originally first made available as part of a digital dataslate range on iTunes, Games Workshop started to widely use datasheets with the onset of 7th Edition and have been the format for unit rules since.

Datasheets provide the rules for individual characters, units, vehicles and even fortifications/terrain along with all their power levels, weapons upgrades and a full breakdown of special rules and common wargear for that unit. Whilst primarily appearing in Codexes, these datasheets can appear elsewhere, such as in Games Workshop's monthly magazine White Dwarf, digitally on iTunes, in the box with the corresponding miniatures or on the Games Workshop webstore. More information on the publications available from Games Workshop can be found on the Codex (Warhammer 40,000) Wikipedia page. This provides a list of all the current books in which it is possible to find datasheets, other rules and also background information.

The currently available datasheets of the factions within the Warhammer 40,000 universe are:

The Imperium of Man:

- The Adeptus Astartes
  - Space Marines
  - Blood Angels
  - Dark Angels
  - Space Wolves
  - Grey Knights
  - Deathwatch
  - Legion of the Damned
- Astra Militarum
- Officio Assassinorum

- Adeptus Mechanicus
- Questor Mechanicus
- Questor Imperialis
- Adeptus Custodes
- Adeptus Ministorum
  - Adepta Sororitas
- Adeptus Astra Telepathica
  - Sisters of Silence

The Forces of Chaos:

- Heretic Astartes
  - Thousand Sons
  - Death Guard
  - Emperor's Children
  - World Eaters
- Chaos Daemons
- Questor Traitoris
- The Fallen

Xenos Races:

- Aeldari (Eldar)
  - Asuryani (Craftworlds)
  - Drukhari (Dark Eldar)
  - Ynnari
  - Harlequins
- Necrons
- Orks
- Tau Empire
- Tyranids
- Genestealer Cults
