= Outlanders (Necromunda) =

1996 supplement for Warhammer 40K

Necromunda: Outlanders
- Designers: Andy Chambers; Jervis Johnson; Chris Colston
- Illustrators: John Blanche; Wayne England; David Gallagher; Mark Gibbons; Des Hanley; Richard Wright
- Publishers: Games Workshop
- Publication: 1996
- Genres: Science fiction/fantasy combat

Outlanders is an expansion published by Games Workshop in 1996 for the science fiction combat game Necromunda.

== Description ==
Outlanders is an expansion of Necromunda, a game of personal combat that takes place in the "Underhive", the lower reaches of the Hive city on the planet Necromunda. Outlanders provides more details of the Badzones of Necromunda's campaign setting.

The rulebook begins by exploring the dangers faced by outcasts living on the fringes of civilization, highlighting their struggles and resilience in harsh, isolated environments. The back half of the book shifts its focus to a dynamic expansion of the setting, introducing competitive gang politics, environmental hazards, alien encounters, mercenary reinforcements, and aggressive wildlife. Four new gangs are introduced: Ratskin Renegades, Redemptionists, Scavvies and Spyrers.

In addition to the rulebook, the game box includes two cardstock buildings, 12 plastic bulkheads to build three-dimensional terrain, various counters and 5 cardstock barricades.

== Publication history ==
Games Workshop made a name for itself with the introduction of their popular Warhammer 40,000 army combat/fantasy role-playing game in 1983. In 1995, Games Workshop released Necromunda, a game based on the same rules as Warhammer, but involving personal combat between small gangs rather than armies. In 1996, Games Workshop released an expansion, Necromunda: Outlanders, designed by Andy Chambers, Jervis Johnson, and Chris Colston, with artwork by John Blanche, Wayne England, David Gallagher, Mark Gibbons, Des Hanley, and Richard Wright.

== Reception ==
In Issue 4 of the British game magazine Arcane , Mark Donald wrote, "Teeming with detail, [Outlanders] overturns every stone of the Badzones and uncovers some nasty lowlife lurking underneath." However Donald warned, "Bear in mind that Outlanders is only really essential for those players who wish to put the effort into a long-term campaign. The worth of the book is in the wealth of detail it contains." Donald also noted, "On the niggly side, the book's deluge of detail makes it heavy going, and the new buildings aren't quite up to the standard of the originals [in Necromunda]." Despite this, Donald concluded by giving the game a rating of 8 out of 10, saying, "Overall though, it's well worth the investment."

In the December 1996 issue of the Polish game magazine Świat Gier Komputerowych, Michał Nowakowski Jezekal noted that "Additional rules in Outlanders include the statistics of monsters from Warhammer 40,000, which players can introduce into their battles. I recommend doing this rather rarely." Jezekal concluded by giving this game an overall rating of 9 out of 10.
