= Tyranid Attack =

Tyranid Attack is a modular board game published in 1993 by miniature hobby company Games Workshop, set in the gothic sci-fi Warhammer 40,000 universe. Tyranid Attack is a re-publication of the 1990 game Advanced Space Crusade without the license from Milton Bradley.

== Gameplay ==
The premise of the game is that a number of Space Marine scout squads are raiding a biological space ship to sabotage delicate "organs" of the ship. The game uses plastic 28mm Citadel Miniatures as play pieces, and has modular board pieces to represent the innards of the Hive ship. The player controlling the alien Tyranids sends waves of warriors to repel/eat the raiding marine scouts.

== Reception ==
Chris McDonough reviewed Tyranid Attack in White Wolf #36 (1993), rating it a 3 out of 5 and stated that "I must say that I'm a sucker for games like these as nothing gives me a bigger charge than battling hordes of creatures streaming down the halls of a ship in a last-ditch stand for survival. And as far as action goes, this game delivers. It is fast-paced and exciting. It just needs to rely a little less on luck, a little more on strategy and contain a few more scenarios. Still, I guess that's what supplements are for."
