= Imperial Armour =

Series of Warhammer 40,000 supplements

Imperial Armour Volume 2, detailing vehicles used by the Space Marines, the Inquisition and the Sisters of Battle

Imperial Armour is a series of rules supplements to the Warhammer 40,000 table-top game, along with an associated range of vehicle-size resin model kits. Both are produced by Forge World, a subsidiary company of Games Workshop.

The Imperial Armour range and rules supplements are designed to incorporate vehicles referred to in the fiction and background material produced for the Warhammer 40,000 fictional universe, but not included in the Codexes due to a variety of reasons. These include super-heavy vehicles (such as the Imperial Baneblade), specialised variants of standard vehicles (such as T'au Empire Hammerhead Gunships modified to carry different turret weapon configurations), aircraft, immobile defenses, and non-combatant vehicles. Vehicles that are featured in the Imperial Armour books are available from Forge World as multi-part resin model kits, or as a series of resin components that can be used to convert existing plastic and metal models. The Imperial Armour range is not limited to conventional vehicles, as the Orks are known to use massive creatures called Squiggoths, and the Tyranids do not possess any vehicles, instead using extremely large bioformed creatures.

== List of Imperial Armour books ==
Early Imperial Armour rules supplements are written by Warwick Kinrade, later ones by Warwick Kinrade and/or Alan Bligh.

Starting in 2015, Forgeworld stopped using the `Volume X' notation, using just Imperial Armour and the title of the book.

=== Currently valid books ===
- Imperial Armour Compendium

=== Outdated books ===
The rules contained in the following books are no longer valid, having been superseded by later editions of the Warhammer 40,000 game and other Imperial Armour books.

- Imperial Armour (2000)
- Imperial Armour II (Ork, Eldar, and Dark Eldar) (2001)
- Imperial Armour Update (models for all races, stopgap measure until the release of the "Imperial Armour Volume x" books). (2002)
- Imperial Armour Volume One - Imperial Guard & Imperial Navy (2003)
- Imperial Armour Update 2004 (rules for Forge World models not covered by the other volumes)
- Imperial Armour Volume Two - Space Marines & Forces of the Inquisition (2004)
- Imperial Armour Update 2005 (same as above)
- Imperial Armour Volume Three - The Taros Campaign (Tau, Imperial Guard and Space Marines) (2005)
- Imperial Armour Update 2006 (same as above)
- Imperial Armour Volume Four - The Anphelion Project (Tyranids, Imperial Guard and Space Marines) (2006)
- Imperial Armour Apocalypse (Companion volume to Warhammer 40,000 Apocalypse, containing new battle formations as well as new Apocalypse-compatible game statistics for several Forge World models) (2007)
- Imperial Armour Volume Five - The Siege of Vraks Part One (Death Korps of Krieg, Dark Angels & Chaos Renegades) (2007)
- Imperial Armour Volume Six - The Siege of Vraks Part Two (Death Korps of Krieg & Chaos Renegades) (2008)
- Imperial Armour Volume Seven - The Siege of Vraks Part Three (Space Marines & Chaos Renegades) (2009)
- Imperial Armour Volume Eight - Raid on Kastorel-Novem (Orks, Elysian Drop Troopers & Raven Guard) (2010)
- Imperial Armour Volume Nine - The Badab War Part One (Focusing on renegade and loyal Space Marine Chapters) (2010)
- Imperial Armour Volume Ten - The Badab War Part Two (Focusing on renegade and loyal Space Marine Chapters) (2010)
- Imperial Armour Apocalypse II (Another companion volume to Warhammer 40,000 Apocalypse, featuring numerous new units for Imperial armies and a few other alien armies. Notable for inclusion of new battle formations for all races, as well as large apocalypse-scale scenarios. (2010)
- Imperial Armour Apocalypse Second Edition (update that combines parts of the two previous Imperial Armour Apocalypse books and adds new units and formations) (2011)
- Imperial Armour Volume Eleven - The Doom of Mymeara (Eldar vs Imperial Guard, Space Wolves) (2011)
- Imperial Armour Volume One (Second Edition) - Imperial Guard (2012)
- Imperial Armour Volume Two (Second Edition) - War Machines of the Adeptus Astartes (2013)
- Imperial Armour Volume Three (Second Edition) - The Taros Campaign (Tau, Imperial Guard and Space Marines) (2013)
- Imperial Armour Volume Four - The Anphelion Project (Second Edition) (Tyranids, Imperial Guard and Space Marines) (2014)
- Imperial Armour - The Siege of Vraks (Death Korps of Krieg, Dark Angels, Space Marines & Chaos Renegades) (2015)
- Imperial Armour - The Doom of Mymeara (Eldar vs Imperial Guard, Space Wolves) (2015)
- Imperial Armour Volume Twelve - The Fall of Orpheus ( Necrons, Death Korps of Krieg & Space Marines) (2013)
- Imperial Armour Volume Thirteen - War Machines of the Lost and the Damned (Chaos Renegades) (2014)
- Imperial Armour Aeronautica (Update and compilation of fliers and anti-aircraft units) (2012)
- Imperial Armour Apocalypse (Updates Apocalypse material for 6th and 7th edition Warhammer 40,000. Not to be confused with the identically named first version) (2013)
- Imperial Armour - Index: Forces of Chaos
- Imperial Armour - Index: Forces of the Adeptus Astartes
- Imperial Armour - Index: Forces of the Astra Militarum
- Imperial Armour - Index: Xenos

=== Model Masterclass ===
Forge World has also published two Model Masterclass books, which focus on painting the often very large and extensive models they produce:

- Imperial Armour Model Masterclass - Volume One (2008)
- Imperial Armour Model Masterclass - Volume Two (2012)
