= Jervis Johnson =

English game designer

- Born: 12 June 1959 (age 66); London
- Occupation: Game designer
- Father: Richard Johnson

Jervis Johnson (born 12 June 1959) is an English tabletop game designer. He worked as a designer and manager for Games Workshop for over 38 years, and was the head of its Specialist Games studio. In addition to his work on Warhammer Fantasy Battles and Warhammer 40,000, he created the fantasy football game Blood Bowl, and co-created Epic 40,000, Necromunda, and Age of Sigmar.

== Career ==
Johnson joined Games Workshop as a trade sales assistant in 1982. In 1986, he began writing rules for the company's own games, writing the first edition of Blood Bowl in his spare time. He was a playtester for Rogue Trader, the first version of Warhammer 40,000. In 1988 Johnson co-created Games Workshop's first 6 mm miniature game, Adeptus Titanicus and its spinoff Space Marine – the beginnings of the Epic 40,000 system. In 1989 he developed Advanced Heroquest, a new version of Milton Bradley's HeroQuest board game.

In the 1990s, Johnson helped develop Advanced Space Crusade, and was one of the Games Workshop staff who designed games for the first iteration of The Crystal Maze. He began working on Warhammer Fantasy Battles in 1992, as a developer for the 4th edition rules, and began writing army books for the game's various factions. In 1993 he did the same for Warhammer 40,000's 2nd edition. Johnson continued to work on Blood Bowl in addition to his new responsibilities, and the third edition of the game won the 1994 Origins Award for Best Miniatures Rules. In 1995 he also co-created Necromunda with Andy Chambers.

In 1995, Johnson organised Games Workshop's first worldwide community campaign, the Battle for Ichar IV, as well as hosting the first International Warhammer Tournament at Nottingham University. In 1996 he began his first column in Games Workshop's magazine White Dwarf, 'The J Files'. Throughout the 1990s and 2000s he continued to write for White Dwarf, as well as working on Epic 40,000, Warhammer Fantasy and Warhammer 40,000. By 2003 he was the head fanatic of Games Workshop's Specialist Games studio, overseeing the development of new versions of Necromunda and Space Hulk. In 2006, 'The J Files' was replaced by his new column 'Standard Bearer', which was in turn replaced with a semi-regular column in 2012.

Johnson was a key developer of Age of Sigmar, the replacement for Warhammer Fantasy Battles, the first edition of which was released in 2015. He continued to design Specialist Games, including 2017's Shadows Over Hammerhal and 2018's Blackstone Fortress, as well as designing new editions of Age of Sigmar.

In July 2021, Johnson announced his retirement from Games Workshop after more than 38 years.

== Personal life ==
Johnson is the son of actor Richard Johnson and his first wife Sheila Sweet. He was educated at Hampstead School. His younger sister is actress Sorel Johnson.
