= HeroQuest: Kellar's Keep =

Kellar's Keep is an anthology of sequentially linked scenarios jointly published by Milton Bradley and Games Workshop in 1991 for the fantasy adventure board game HeroQuest .

== Description ==
In HeroQuest: Kellar's Keep, the players undergo a series of ten scenarios in which they enter a secret passage into Kellar's Keep in an attempt to rescue the Emperor and his army.

The game box includes 17 miniatures of monsters, and cardboard tiles representing traps, furniture and other landmarks.

== Publication history ==
Game designer Steve Baker developed an adventure board game after moving from Games Workshop to Milton Bradley. The result was HeroQuest, jointly published by both companies in 1989. The companies published a series of continuing adventures designed by Baker, including 1991's Kellar's Keep.

On Dec 21, 2021, the first "online quest" was released called "Forsaken Tunnels of Xor-Xel". This is designed to story the journey between the original quest book and Kellar's Keep.

== Reception ==
In Issue 168 of Dragon (April 1991), Ken Rolston thought this was a good buy for younger players, saying, "If the young folks exhaust the scenarios in the original game, get these to keep them playing."

The Dutch review site Boardspel Mania gave the game an above average strategy rating of 8 out of 10, but also noted that it relied heavily on luck due to dice rolls.

== Reviews ==
- Dragão Brasil #3 (1994) (Portuguese)

== Other recognition ==
A copy of HeroQuest: Kellar's Keep is held in the collection of the Strong National Museum of Play (object 112.6148).
