= Warhammer Quest =

Board game

- Manufacturers: Games Workshop
- Designers: Andy Jones
- Illustrators: Geoff Taylor, Richard Wright, Dave Gallagher, John Blanche, Wayne England & Mark Gibbons
- Publishers: Games Workshop
- Years active: 1995–1998, 2016–2025
- Players: 1–6
- Playing time: 2–3 Hours

Warhammer Quest is a fantasy dungeon, role-playing adventure wargame released by Games Workshop in 1995 as the successor to HeroQuest and Advanced Heroquest, set in its fictional Warhammer Fantasy world. The game focuses upon a group of warriors who join to earn their fame and fortune in the darkest depths of the Old World.

Games Workshop ended the original run of Warhammer Quest in 1998. Eighteen years after the game ceased production, Games Workshop released a new version of the game, Warhammer Quest: Silver Tower in 2016.

== Game ==
Mainly written by Andy Jones, Warhammer Quest utilises a set of simple game mechanics to simulate the Warriors' actions as they explore and fight through the dungeons of the Old World. The game puts a strong emphasis on co-operative and thoughtful play by the players in order to survive against the myriad monsters they inevitably face.

Primarily designed for four players, the original game continues the tradition of HeroQuest by supplying a Barbarian, Wizard, Dwarf, and Elf as its main Warriors.

The game components are

- a 4-page introductory booklet
- a 32-page rule book
- 10 plastic dungeon doorways
- a 192-page role-playing book
- a 16-page adventure book
- 56 plastic bases
- 91 plastic miniatures
- 108 playing cards
- 32 game board sections
- 58 counters and tokens
- 4 character cards
- 50-sheet adventure record pad
- 18 six-sided dice;
- game box

=== Treasure ===
The game focuses on the acquisition of vast amounts of treasure, which is divided into two types:

- Dungeon Room treasure is collected after every group of Dungeon Monsters are killed.
- Objective Room treasure is sometimes collected once the warriors have killed all monsters within the given objective room or as a reward at the end of the Adventure.

Treasure can be sold for gold, which can then be used to pay for training and advancement, as well as buying items essential to survival: healing, a weapon, extra armour, or magical talismans that evoke special abilities.

=== Monsters ===
All of the hostile creatures encountered by Warrior parties are known under the collective name of "Monsters". Almost all Warhammer creatures of the time were included in the Bestiary section of the Roleplay Book. Monsters are broadly divided into the following species:

- Beastmen
- Chaos (Warriors and Daemons)
- Chaos Dwarves
- Dark Elves
- Monsters (creatures with no specific affiliation e.g. Gorgons, Ogres, Dragons etc.)
- Orcs and Goblins
- Skaven
- Undead

Lizardmen are the only major race not to feature in the game. They were later released as an additional supplement in the Warhammer Quest magazine "Deathblow".

The challenge of encounters is related to the current Dungeon level and the strength of the party. At lower levels, a small group of Orcs will provide a reasonable challenge; at higher levels, tougher opponents such as Ogres and Dragons are encountered.

== Warhammer Quest Roleplaying ==
The game was released with a Roleplay Book, which enables players to expand their games by introducing tabletop roleplaying game mechanics. When used, the Roleplay Book offers the players the chance to travel between Settlements, train to the next level, visit numerous shops and traders, as well as visit Special Locations. The Wizard, Elf, and Dwarf have a Special Location that was exclusive to each of them and, if their luck was good and if they had enough gold, they could buy speciality items to help them in their adventures.

Additionally, the Roleplay Book introduces the element of Psychology, which includes new rules for Fear, Terror, Hatred, Breaking (fleeing), and being Prone. There are also rules and descriptions for using two new Characteristics: Luck and Willpower.

The Roleplay Book also contains a bestiary of Monsters that the warriors might encounter. The Roleplay Book also offers a Hazards Table (for use when travelling to a village, town or city), a Settlement Events Table (for use when spending time in a settlement), extra Treasure and Objective Room Treasure tables as well as 'Battle-level Monster Tables' for use as the Warriors' careers progress.

The last section of the Roleplay Book contains guidelines for writing adventures and Warrior development. It also contains an entire pre-written campaign for the Gamemaster and the Warriors to play as well as introducing the first expansion Warrior of Warhammer Quest: the Dwarf Trollslayer.

== Warrior progression ==
Every Warrior can be progressed up to 10 stages or 'Battle Levels'. In many role-playing games, character advance by accumulating experience points. In Warhammer Quest a Warrior accumulates gold to advance battle-levels and can also use the gold to buy items. Every monster encountered and killed is worth a certain amount of Gold. In addition, the Warrior can sell any treasure at the end of the adventure. The leader carrying the lantern (typically the Barbarian) decides which warrior gained an item of treasure.

== Expansions ==
A number of expansions were released for Warhammer Quest. These included two new adventure packs, several Warrior packs as well as additional Treasure Card packs and a set of blank Monster Cards & Event cards, where players could record their own monsters from the Warhammer world that were not written within the Roleplay book or else not produced as an official card by Games Workshop.

=== Adventure packs ===
There were two adventure packs released for the game. Lair of the Orc Lord contained six new adventures against Greenskins (Orcs & Goblins) while Catacombs of Terror featured six new adventures that pitted the Warriors against the evils of the Undead. Both expansions contained new, pewter models to represent their enemies as well as new Board tiles and cards.

=== Warrior packs ===
Games Workshop released packs for nine additional Warriors, all of which had some background within the Warhammer world. The packs consisted of a Warrior model, rulebook and a set of card tokens detailing the warrior's original statistics & equipment. The rulebooks offered a piece of background as to the warrior-type & a set of rules to use the warrior including details about any new special locations they might visit, skills or equipment they could obtain as well as details about their Battle Level progression. The Warrior Packs released were as follows:

- Pit Fighter
- Warrior Priest
- Imperial Noble
- Elf Ranger
- Dwarf Trollslayer
- Chaos Warrior
- Wardancer
- Witch Hunter
- Bretonnian Knight

== Magazines ==
=== White Dwarf ===
To accompany Warhammer Quest Games Workshop produced a number of articles in their White Dwarf magazine that added additional elements to the game play such as extra rooms, adventures & other articles. They were as follows:

- WD 184 – Design Notes on the original game.
- WD 185 – Release of 'The Pit Fighter' warrior pack & rules. "Mission Impossible" article: floorplan and Cards for the 'Gaol' special quest and special rules for hidden passages.
- WD 186 – Release of the 'Warrior Priest' warrior pack & rules. "Flames of Khazla" article: floorplan and Cards for the Flames of Khazla special quest, also the release of the first Treasure pack & blank Event cards.
- WD 187 – Release of 'Lair of the Orc Lord' & design notes & release of the 'Imperial Noble' warrior pack.
- WD 188 – Release of the 'Elf Ranger' warrior pack. "Creatures of Darkness" article: guidelines to create your own Monster Cards.
- WD 189 – Release of the 'Trollslayer' warrior pack. "The Darkness Below" article: a set of guidelines to alter dungeon generation.
- WD 190 – Release of the 'Chaos Warrior' warrior pack. "Dark Secrets" article: extra cards that Warriors could take to add an extra element to an adventure or to the warrior's background.
- WD 191 – Release of 'Catacombs of Terror' and the 'Wardancer' warrior pack. "A Horror Awakens" article: how to link three new adventures and included two new treasure cards. Showcase of a superb Warhammer Quest diorama by legendary miniature painter Mike McVey.
- WD 192 – Release of the 'Witch Hunter' warrior pack. "Into the Depths" article: adding yet more variety through dungeon design. Also included two new Board Sections(Collapsed Passage, Into the Dark/Spiral Staircase and Dead End).
- WD 193 – "A Dungeon of Your Own" article: tailoring Blank Event Cards with Monsters and Events. Included four new Event Cards.
- WD 194 – "Well Met!" article: Warrior Parties and their composition including the pros and cons.
- WD 195 – "Domain of the Horned Rat" article: introducing Skaven-themed dungeons, a new monster 'the Rat Golem' & a new objective room - Quirrik's Laboratory.
- WD 196 – "On the Waterfront" article: part 1 of an article on foreign travel. Involved travelling to far and distant lands, introducing coastal towns and rules for finding a ship and captain to sail the seas.
- WD 197 – "Lost Kingdoms" article: part 2 of an article on foreign travel including boarding ships as well as ocean events if Warriors decide to set sail to distant lands.
- WD 198 – Warhammer Quest Q&A.
- WD 199 – "Getting Out Once In A While" article: part 1 of an article on converting your warriors for use within Warhammer Fantasy.
- WD 200 – "Getting a Breath of Fresh Air" article: part 2 of an article on converting your warriors for use within Warhammer Fantasy.
- WD 201 – "A Green and Pustulant Land" article: introducing a Nurgle themed mini-campaign.
- WD 202 – "Out of the Darkness" article: introducing adventures beyond the confines of dungeons.
- WD 204 – "Room For Improvement" article: improving you dungeons as well as introducing a new board section (The Sewer) and a new Chaos Slaanesh adventure.
- WD 208 – Release of the 'Bretonnian Knight' warrior pack. Also a retrospective look at Warhammer Quest and its evolution.

=== Citadel Journal ===
To accompany Warhammer Quest Games Workshop produced a number of articles in their Citadel Journal magazine that added new semi-official adventures and scenarios, alternatives rules, and warriors. Some articles were written by the usual contributors of Warhammer Quest while others were fan-submitted material. They were as follows:

- CJ 16 – "Ex-Blood Bowl Player" article: introduced the Ex-Blood Bowl Warrior.
- CJ 17 – "Messing With Their Heads: Riddles As Plot Devices" article: how to use riddles in the Gamemaster version.
- CJ 18 – "Into the Woods: Wood Elves in Warhammer Quest" article: Wood Elf dungeons scenarios.
- CJ 19 – "The Eyes of Doom" article: a Roleplay adventure vs. Undead for Battle-level 6+ Warriors.
- CJ 21 – "Wotchoo Lookin' At?" article: introduced the Ogre Warrior.
- CJ 22 – "Downtown" article: rules for exploring Settlements by using the dungeon Board Sections.
- CJ 24 – "You Thieving Little B*****!" article: introduced the Halfling Thief Warrior.
- CJ 25 – "(The Warhammer Quest Adventurer's) 'Catalogue of Dungeon Furnishings'" ad: GW Mail Order items.
- CJ 26 – "Njet Comrade!" article: introduced the Kislevite Shaman Warrior.
- CJ 26 – "The Struggle for Karak Eight Peaks" article: A subterranean Warhammer Scenario.
- CJ 28 – "The Low Life and the High Life: Going to Town" article: rules for Alehouses including Bar-room Brawls.
- CJ 29 – "Escape From Hag Graef" article: a new quest to escape the Dark Elves.
- CJ 32 – "Taverns of the Beastmen" article: a regular or Roleplay Beastmen adventure for Battle-levels 1–2. Also "Warped Visions: Trollslayer – Triumph and Tragedy in Warhammer Quest" comic: a Trollslayer comic by Brian Pope.
- CJ 33 – "Wanted Dead or Alive" article: introduced the Outlaw Warrior.
- CJ 34 – "Tower of Hazuk" article: a Roleplay adventure for Battle-levels 1–2.
- CJ 35 – "Bounty Hunter" article: introduced the Bounty Hunter Warrior.
- CJ 37 – "Errata" article: provided the missing Outlaw Generation table for the Bounty Hunter Warrior from CJ 35.
- CJ 38 – "The Squig Hopper Dungeon Race" article: An amusing little racing game.

=== Deathblow Magazine ===
Deathblow was a dedicated Warhammer Quest journal released by Games Workshop to accompany the game in a similar vein to its Citadel Journal and Fanatic Magazine. Deathblow consisted of only three issues. Deathblow included articles by contributors outside of Games Workshop's employ and featured articles from White Dwarf, the Citadel Journal and contained new adventures and a selection of other Warhammer Quest related paraphernalia.

Deathblow introduced eight new Warriors: The Halfling Thief, Kislev Shaman, an Assassin, an Ogre, Druid of Albion, Dwarf Brewmaster, Salty Seadog & Lord of Aenarion.

Deathblow was named after Warhammer Quest's 'Death-Blow' mechanic where if a warrior killed a monster in one single strike he could then carry that attack through to an adjacent monster.

Deathblow #1

- Down Town
- The Bank
- Eyes of Doom
- Dangerous Dwarfs
- Spawn of the Old Ones
- Rumble in the Jungle
- Claws of the Bear
- Njet Comrade
- You Thieving Little B*****!
- You Ain't Seen Me, Right?
- Wotchoo lookin' At?

Deathblow #2

- The Shattered Amulet
- The Return of The Dark Queen
- Aaarh, Me Spleen
- Creatures of Darkness
- A Horror Awakens
- On the Waterfront
- Lost Kingdoms
- Oi! Get off me Juniper Bushes!
- Mine's a Pint... Hic!
- Aaarrr, Me hearties
- The Dungeon Architects
- Hot From The Forges

Deathblow #3

- Arabian Nights
- Out of the darkness
- The Good, The Bad and the Rotting
- The Low Life and the High Life
- Questions and Answers
- Lord of Aenarion

== New releases ==
Eighteen years after the original game ceased production, Games Workshop released Warhammer Quest: Silver Tower (2016), Warhammer Quest: Shadows Over Hammerhal (2017), Warhammer Quest: Blackstone Fortress (2018),Warhammer Quest: Cursed City (2021), Warhammer Quest: Lost Relics (2022) and Warhammer Quest: Darkwater (2025). These games follow the original in overall design as dungeon crawling board games, but with substantially different rulesets. Warhammer Quest: Silver Tower, Warhammer Quest: Shadows Over Hammerhal,Warhammer Quest: Cursed City, Warhammer Quest: Lost Relics and Warhammer Quest: Darkwater are set in Games Workshops new fantasy setting, Warhammer Age of Sigmar. While Warhammer Quest: Blackstone Fortress is set in Games Workshops sci-fi universe Warhammer 40,000.

== Warhammer Quest contributors ==
Warhammer Quest and its expansions/articles were authored, illustrated or produced in whole, or in part, by the following:

Andy Jones, Geoff Taylor, Richard Wright, Dave Gallagher, John Blanche, Wayne England, Mark Gibbons, Bryan Ansell, Gavin Thorpe, Ian Pickstock, Mark Hawkins, Dean Bass, Steve Anastasoff, Tuomas Pirinen, Mark Hawkins and more.

== Adaptations ==
=== Video games ===
On 20 August 2012 GW announced Warhammer Quest for iOS devices. The development company is Rodeo Games. It was released on 30 May 2013. It received positive reviews from critics.

It was later ported to PC, Mac and Linux by Twistplay and was released by Chilled Mouse on Steam on 7 January 2015, Android on 25 June 2015, and later to the PlayStation 4 and Xbox One.

Warhammer Quest 2: The End Times by Perchang was released on 20 October 2017 for iOS and for Android on 11 April 2018. It received average reviews from critics.

Warhammer Quest: Silver Tower was released for Android and iOS on September 3, 2020, based on the 2016 sequel of the board game.

=== Card game ===
A card game adaptation, Warhammer Quest: The Adventure Card Game, was released in 2015 by Fantasy Flight Games. It got a positive review from Robert Florence of Rock Paper Shotgun: "Is this game a reasonable substitute for the full-flavour Warhammer Quest? Absolutely not. That old game is something very, very special. But this is an impressive attempt to pull some of that game's magic into a smaller box and support it with modern game mechanics. I was really surprised by how right it all felt."

== Reception ==
In the January 1996 edition of Dragon (Issue 225), Rick Swan liked the high quality of the game components, and the "easy-on-the-brain explanations" of the rules. But Swan objected to actual object of the game, which he summed up as "a string of random events, most of them combat encounters, with an occasional death trap thrown in to break the monotony." Swan also noted the game's complete lack of realism, but said, "Warhammer Quest doesn't pretend to be realistic, and therefore doesn't deserve to be criticized for its lack of logic. That's like criticizing a candy bar for its lack of vitamins." Swan concluded by giving the game an average rating of 4 out of 6, and only recommended the game as a means of training up new role-players: "Warhammer Quest does a [sic] admirable job of incorporating role-playing fundamentals, and thus serves as a painless introduction to RPGs. And when Quest-ers get the hang of hit points and attribute scores, that's where you step in with Call of Cthulhu or the AD&D game."

== Reviews ==
- Rollespilsmagasinet Fønix (Danish) (Issue 8 - May/June 1995)

== See also ==
- Dungeonquest
- Mighty Warriors
