= Space Crusade =

1990 board game

- Space Crusade box art (version by David Sque)
- Manufacturers: Milton Bradley and Games Workshop
- Designers: Stephen Baker
- Illustrators: Jim Burns and David Sque
- Publishers: Milton Bradley
- Years active: 1990
- Players: 2 to 4
- Chance: Dice

Space Crusade is an adventure board game produced by Milton Bradley together with Games Workshop and was first made in 1990. It was produced in the UK and available in some other countries including Finland, Ireland, France, Spain, Denmark, Australia, Hellas and New Zealand. In Germany, Italy, Belgium and the Netherlands, it is known as Star Quest.

It is a sister game to HeroQuest, which was also produced by Milton Bradley and Games Workshop. It uses many of the concepts of the Games Workshop's Space Hulk and Warhammer 40,000 games, but at a much simpler level of gameplay.

The game was designed by Steven Baker. The original box artwork was by Jim Burns, and the later edition had a cover by David Sque.

== Gameplay ==
The game is designed to be played with 2 to 4 players, taking turns until one wins. One player takes the role of the aliens, controlling all the aliens and monsters on the space hulk, which were a mixture of Chaos, Orks, Genestealers and other aliens from Warhammer 40,000. The alien player takes on a significantly reduced role compared with that of a Game Master in traditional role-playing games, with its sole role being to stop the marine players from accomplishing their missions.

The other players are marine players, and each controls a squad of 5 Space Marines in standard Power armour, one of whom is a Commander. Each squad is further equipped with order commands as well as equipment cards. Marines can be armed with different weapons: light weapons allow marines to move faster at the cost of reduced firepower. Heavy weapons operate in special ways, such as being able to hit all units in a horizontal line, or attacking multiple targets.

The blue squad represents the Ultramarines, the red squad represents the Blood Angels, and the yellow squad represents the Imperial Fists. All three are founding chapters of the Space Marines, and the chapter can be recognised by the insignia on the slider board, and accurately represents the standard colours of the Warhammer 40,000 versions. Each of the chapters are identical, although the equipment cards for the Blood Angels are specialised in close combat, and the Imperial Fists in use of ranged heavy weapons.

Close range combat rules are enforced when two units engaging are next to each other; the controlling player of the two units in combat roll whatever number of dice allowed for that unit, and the highest wins. Otherwise, ranged combat rules are followed so long as there is line of sight between the two squares that each unit is occupying: the firing player rolls dice for the weapon being fired, and if the dice total is above the armour value of the target, it is dealt hit points.

The squad-based system gives each player greater access to strategy and planning. Most of the game is careful calculations of avoiding line of sight, and rushing to attack either from around the corridor, through open doors, or close in with close combat. The mission-based system sometimes allows a player to sacrifice units to score points in order to win.

The marine players have the advantage of heavy weapons, special equipment and high armour point values due to their Power armour, while the alien player has the advantage of large numbers of pieces and random "Alien Event" cards which may be detrimental to his opponents. The marine Commanders have multiple hit points and special weapons, making them harder to kill.

Each game consists of the Space Marine players receiving their primary mission, docking and entering the space hulk (and later dreadnought factories), completing their mission before the other marine players, and returning their team back to the docking claw. Points are scored for units killed and missions completed, and deducted for units lost. Players with sufficient points at the end of the game (including the Alien Player) can be promoted to the next rank, which gives them access to additional order or equipment for the subsequent games.

== German Edition ==
The German version of the game was published under the name StarQuest to tie-in with HeroQuest, which, at that time, was very popular amongst German children.

Due to the country's stricter censorship laws (see Federal Department for Media Harmful to Young Persons), the translation tones down most of the violent game elements: The aliens are "Chaos robots", not living creatures. A player does not kill a robot, the robot is merely removed from this dimension or gets caught by the effects of the weapons and is not harmed at all. Although for example the "Assault Cannon" can quite easily be recognised as a type of machine gun, in the German version it is called "Zero Time Gun" and its effect is explained as "time bubbles" slowing down the enemy.

=== Box contents ===
Space Crusade had a large number of components. The list below is included as both a reference and as an indication of quite how comprehensive the game was.

- 50 figures

- 3 Marine Commanders - 12 Space Marines, 8 Orks, 14 Gretchin, - 3 Genestealers - 1 Chaos Marine Commander, - 4 Chaos Space Marines, 4 Androids and - 1 Dreadnought

- 64 Playing Cards

- Three sets of 12 Chapter cards and 28 Alien event cards

- 32 blip tokens
- 12 rank badges
- 6 honour badges
- 1 Alien control panel
- 24 doors
- 6 combat dice
- 3 marine reference charts
- 32 reinforcement counters
- 1 primary mission token
- 1 secondary mission token
- 4 marks of Chaos
- 4 piece gameboard with walls
- 3 marine landing docks with airlocks (extra board pieces where the space marines start)
- 3 Commander Scanners with Slides
- Rule book
- 24 page Mission Manual
- Advanced rules book

== Expansion games and sequels ==
=== Eldar Attack ===
A boxed expansion set that introduced Eldar with special abilities including psychic powers.

This expansion pack allowed one extra player to control the Eldar miniatures, thus allowing the game to be played by 2–5 people.

=== Mission Dreadnought ===
A boxed expansion set.

This expansion pack gives the Marine player access to additional Space Marine miniatures, boosting the squad to 6 Space Marines and the commander. Space Marines may carry extra heavy weapons or the Tarantula mobile turret.

The alien player gains extra heavy Dreadnoughts, which are extremely powerful and capable of wiping out an entire squad. The last mission in the additional mission book allows the alien player to continuously construct additional dreadnoughts for more firepower from the dreadnought factory board.

The additional bulkhead doors and corridor tiles allow players to build more interesting board layouts, whereas the initial game is quite limited to either the square 2 × 2 mode or the long 4 × 1 mode.

=== White Dwarf ===
Two articles about Space Crusade were published in White Dwarf: one for using Terminators, Space Marine Scouts, Ork Mobs, Tyranids and Genestealer Hybrids (White Dwarf 134, 1991), allowing players to use Warhammer 40,000 miniatures, and one adding rules for psychic combat and including a campaign called 'Renegade' (White Dwarf 145, 1992).

=== Advanced Space Crusade ===
Advanced Space Crusade was a modular board game published in 1990 by Games Workshop. The premise of the game is that a number of Space Marine scout squads are boarding a Tyranid ship in order to sabotage its delicate internal "organs". The game is superficially similar to Space Hulk in that it uses 28 mm plastic Citadel Miniatures as play pieces, uses modular board pieces to represent the innards of the Hive Ship, and has one player controlling the Marines while the other controls waves of Tyranids, but has no greater relationship to Space Crusade than any other game set in the Warhammer 40,000 universe. Without the licence from Milton Bradley, many of the components of Advanced Space Crusade were released in the 1993 game Tyranid Attack, a substantially different game.

Unlike the original Space Crusade game, which used custom-based combat dice, Advanced Space Crusade utilised a twelve-sided dice (D12) system for all gameplay mechanics, mirroring the same exclusive D12-only concept used in Advanced Heroquest.

== Video game ==
Gremlin Graphics Software Ltd. released the Space Crusade video game version of the game in early 1992. It was available on Atari ST, IBM PC (MS-DOS), Amiga, ZX Spectrum, Commodore 64 and Amstrad CPC and later received an expansion, The Voyage Beyond. It is considered a faithful conversion of the boardgame, with a board that could be viewed in 2D or isometric projection views (Barker, 1992). The ZX Spectrum version was voted number 24 in the Your Sinclair Readers' Top 100 Games of All Time.

== Reviews ==
- Challenge #56 (1991) – Advanced Space Crusade
- Strategy Plus
- Dragon #168 (April 1991) p36–37
