= Codex: Angels of Death =

Table top game supplement

Codex: Angels of Death is a supplement published by Games Workshop in 1996 for the table-top miniatures game Warhammer 40,000. The supplement focuses on the Space Marine chapters known as the Dark Angels and the Blood Angels, who harbour a thousand-year secret and seek to expiate their guilt on the field of battle.

== Contents ==
Codex: Angels of Death is a supplement which details the history, organizational structure and character of the Blood Angel and Dark Angel Space Marine chapters, and includes rules that cover the style, weapons and capabilities of both groups. The book also describes powerful characters associated with both chapters, as well as the special units Ravenwing and Deathwing.

== Publication history ==
In 1987, Games Workshop released the science fiction miniatures wargame Warhammer 40,000, followed by a second edition in 1993. Many supplements and expansions for the second edition followed, including Codex: Angels of Death in 1996, a 120-page softcover book created by Rick Priestley and Jarvis Johnson, with artwork by John Blanche, Wayne England, Mark Gibbons, and Des Hanley. The book contents became obsolete in 1998 with the release of the 3rd edition of Warhammer 40,000.

== Reception ==
In Issue 3 of the UK magazine Arcane, Mark Donald called this "the most professionally produced Codex to date. It's clear, comprehensive and contains some great art, especially on the stormy front cover." Donald noted that this was not new material, writing, "You may already have most of this book in a different guise." Nevertheless, Donald recommended buying this book, giving it a rating of 7 out of 10 while concluding, "If you want just one Space Marine Codex, then get this."

In Issue 92 of the French magazine Casus Belli, Emmanuel Quenez noted, "This supplement is timely for all defenders of the countless human interstellar colonies." After summarizing the book's content, Quenez concluded, "This excellent work will reinforce human troops, which is far from being a luxury in this terrifying universe."

In a retrospective review written 25 years after the book's publication, Greg Chiasson admitted "Yes, it seems like a clunky first draft, but that's because it kind of is." But Chiasson pointed out "All of [present-day Warhammer] was built off of this, and I have to respect what they did here, capturing the imagination of an entire generation of nerds." Chiasson also noted that the book had been a good deal, writing, "For something that went for $20 back in the day, there's a lot of book here – over 100 pages even before you factor in the catalog pages. It's not full-color, and it's soft cover, but still, amazing value for money." Chiasson concluded, "I truly adore this book. As an artifact, if not a gaming piece, it rules."
