= HeroQuest II: Legacy of Sorasil =

1994 video game

- Developer: Gremlin Interactive
- Publisher: Gremlin Interactive
- Producer: Tony Casson
- Designer: Paul Green
- Programmers: Kevin Dudley (original code), Mike Hart (additional code), Simon Short (level construction)
- Artists: Matt Furniss, Alan Batson (manual illustrations), Steve McKevitt and Kai MacMahon (manual)
- Composer: Patrick Phelan
- Series: HeroQuest
- Platforms: Amiga 1200; Amiga CD32; Amiga 600; Amiga 500
- Release: EU: 1994
- Genre: Role-playing game
- Modes: up to 4 players, alternate turns

HeroQuest II: Legacy of Sorasil is an isometric role-playing game that was released on Amiga with OCS/ECS chipsets and CD32 console in 1994 by Gremlin Interactive. The game is the sequel to the 1991 video game HeroQuest, both inspired by the adventure board game HeroQuest from Milton Bradley.

== Gameplay ==
There are 9 large missions to take on. The players can choose a team of 4 from 8 character classes. The abilities of these can be customized before the game starts. The game is controlled using action icons at the bottom of the screen to set the basic instructions to move, fight, open doors, search for treasure or hidden doors and traps.

== Lore ==
The game is set in the land of Rhia, the seat of a kingdom which now suffers under a plague induced by the magical actions of a malevolent being. The player is tasked by a mage with finding different amulets, talismans and stones, scattered throughout different kingdoms, which together could be used to stop and reverse the effects that the plague has had on Rhia.

== Reception ==
The game received generally positive reviews.

The One gave HeroQuest II an overall score of 74%, calling it "the same old HeroQuest with slightly flashier graphics and a different plot. ... [HeroQuest II] comes across as being just a little half-hearted". Despite this, The One goes on to state that "there's a fair degree of enjoyment to be had. There's a well-crafted learning curve", and praised the game's "intuitive" UI, but remarking that the game overall feels dated.
