= HeroQuest (video game) =

1991 video game

- C64 box cover
- Developer: Gremlin Interactive
- Publisher: Gremlin Interactive
- Designer: Stephen Baker
- Composer: Barry Leitch
- Platforms: Amiga, Amstrad CPC, Atari ST, Archimedes, Commodore 64, MS-DOS, ZX Spectrum
- Release: 1991: Amiga, C64, CPC, MS-DOS, Spectrum, ST; 1993: Archimedes
- Genre: Turn-based tactics

HeroQuest is a video game based on the HeroQuest board game. It was published in 1991 for Amiga, Amstrad CPC, Atari ST, Commodore 64, MS-DOS, and ZX Spectrum. An Acorn Archimedes version followed in 1993.

A sequel, HeroQuest II: Legacy of Sorasil, was released in 1994.

== Reception ==
Reception

Awards
| Publication | Award |
|---|---|
| Crash | Crash Smash |
| Sinclair User | SU Classic |
| Amstrad Action | Mastergame |

The One gave the Amiga version of HeroQuest an overall score of 91%, expressing that it "for the most part" faithfully recreates the tabletop version, but is 'oversimplified' in some areas, and stating that "this over-simplifying is mainly apparent in [combat]: a larger feeling of involvement would have been generated by even the simplest of additions such as the rolling of a dice [sic]. As it stands, the fights are pretty bland and act more as a temporary obstacle than as a major part of the excitement". The One also criticises HeroQuest's 'minimal' animation, but expresses that aside from these grievances, HeroQuest has succeeded in "taking all the elements from the board game and convincingly turning them into a highly playable computer game", furthermore calling it "an excellent conversion of an already enjoyable table-top".

The reviewer from Amiga Computing wrote that "HeroQuest represents great value for the money". The reviewer from Amiga Action considered the game "worth buying whether you are a fan of the boardgame or not. Excellent!". The reviewer from Amiga Format said: "Gremlin have managed to produce the computer doppelgänger of the original board-game bestseller and 300,000 people can't be wrong: can they?" The reviewer from CU Amiga stated that "Gremlin must be congratulated for a job well done". The reviewer from Amiga Power wrote that "HeroQuest is an enjoyable piece of software indeed, and one of the best multiplayer experiences available for the Amiga". The reviewer from ACAR called the game "technically superb".
