= Warhammer 40,000 Apocalypse =

Book by Jervis Johnson

- Author: Jervis Johnson
- Series: Warhammer 40,000
- Genre: wargaming
- Publisher: Games Workshop
- Publication date: October 2007
- Publication place: UK
- ISBN: 1-84154-838-3
- OCLC: 316782233

Warhammer 40,000 Apocalypse is an expansion to the Warhammer 40,000 tabletop miniatures wargame by the British gaming company Games Workshop. It contains rules which allow players to field massive armies the likes of which are unwieldy using the basic Warhammer 40,000 ruleset. It also allows players to field units that are not available in normal Warhammer 40,000 games, such as large super-heavy tanks and robot-like titans, some of which can stand up to 400 feet in game-scale height.

The first print of the Apocalypse sourcebook was released in October 2007, during the latter days of Warhammer 40,000's fourth edition. The release of the fifth edition of Warhammer 40,000 in 2008 prompted Games Workshop to start working on an update to the Apocalypse ruleset in order to streamline its compatibility with the new edition. This update culminated in the announcement of Warhammer 40,000: Apocalypse Reload, an all-new 88-page edition of the Apocalypse rulebook. The newest edition was released in July 2013, along with new models, templates and scenery pieces. It has 296 pages of full color as well as updated rules for the game.

Along with the official sourcebooks themselves, Games Workshop and its subsidiary Forge World has released supplementary material and model kits that can only be used with the Apocalypse ruleset. Most notable of which was the plastic Baneblade super-heavy tank boxed set released by Games Workshop at the same time as the Apocalypse rulebook. At the time, the Baneblade was the largest plastic kit that the company produced; Prior to that time, all large Warhammer 40,000 tanks were produced only in resin by Forge World. The Baneblade was also the first Warhammer 40,000 model kit created by Games Workshop that could only be used with an optional expansion and not within the base Warhammer 40,000 game. The Stompa was released along with the first edition, an Ork model of a ramshackle metal giant with multiple weapons around its belly and arms. In the newest edition, the Necron Tesseract and the Khorne Lord of Skulls were released as the super heavy models during Apocalypse games. Along with the Baneblade and the Stompa, they are the only models built around Apocalypse that are not produced by Forge World. The Necron Tesseract is a prison containing a god-like being, releasing massive amounts of lethal energy around the battlefield. The Khorne Lord of Skulls is a Chaos tank fused with cannons and a chainsaw of a metal knight-like body.

Like many other miniature wargames, Warhammer 40,000 relies on a point-based system to ensure a balanced game between players. Players set a maximum amount of pointage that they will construct their armies with. No matter what faction a player uses, each unit has a corresponding point cost, with generally powerful units costing much more than standard soldiers. A typical game of Warhammer 40,000 ranges from 500 to a little over 2,000 points. The introduction of the Apocalypse sourcebook offered players a streamlined ruleset for playing games of well over 3,000 points. Apocalypse also allows for the use of allies, in order to help players to reach an Apocalypse size army.

Games Workshop released Apocalypse formations, which are essentially dozens of miniature to play an Apocalypse game, in July 2013. They are often the quickest way to build an Apocalyptic army.

== Bibliography ==
- Warhammer 40,000: Apocalypse (1st ed.). Nottingham: Games Workshop. October 2007. ISBN 1-84154-838-3.
- "White Dwarf Online #72". 2007-08-03.
