= Advanced Heroquest =

RPG board game

- Designers: Jervis Johnson
- Publishers: Games Workshop
- Publication: 1989
- Players: 1 to 5
- Playing time: ca. 90 minutes
- Chance: Dice (D12 system)

Advanced Heroquest is a board game designed by Jervis Johnson and published by Games Workshop in 1989, a sequel to HeroQuest.

== Description ==
The original HeroQuest was an adventure board game created in 1989 by Milton Bradley in conjunction with the British company Games Workshop. Later the same year, Games Workshop released Advanced Heroquest, a similar but more complex game. Changes from HeroQuest include more complex and RPG-like rules, a modular board and the use of henchmen. The included quests feature the heroes entering a Skaven-infested dungeon in order to retrieve a magical artefact. While the only monsters included in the miniatures set are the ratmen known as Skaven, statistics for all the monsters that appear in the HeroQuest game are given, and it is possible to meet some or all of them via the random generation encounter tables.

== Contents ==
The boxed set includes:

- A 64-page rulebook including an introductory campaign the "Quest for the Shattered Amulet" and solo gameplay rules
- 36 plastic 25 mm miniatures: 4 heroes (warrior, dwarf, elf, wizard), 20 Skaven, and 12 henchmen
- 6 plastic doors
- 2 twelve-sided (D12) dice
- 78 counters and interlocking room and corridor sections that are combined to produce modular dungeon maps

== Gameplay ==
The game uses 12-sided dice for skill and combat resolution. Both heroes and monsters are defined by Weapon Skill, Bow Skill, Strength, Toughness, Wounds, Speed, Intelligence, and Bravery.

Combat is resolved in melee by rolling a target figure that is determined by the difference between the target's and player's Weapon Skills; in ranged combat, the target number is determined by how far away the target is versus the character's Bow Skill. In both cases, if the target number is achieved, the attacker rolls a number of dice determined by Strength and what weapon was being used. The number of dice that exceed the opponent's Toughness becomes the number of Wounds inflicted.

In the 1980s, for a dungeon crawler, Advanced Heroquest was unique because it utilised a twelve-sided dice (D12) system for all gameplay mechanics. These included combat, magic, exploration, and random dungeon generation. Advanced Heroquest was one of the first specialist games using a D12 system produced by Games Workshop. Whilst the optional Hero creation rules referenced smaller dice (D4, D6, and D8) to determine starting characteristics, the manual suggested players could simulate these results using the provided D12.

== Expansion ==
=== Terror in the Dark ===
An expansion to Advanced Heroquest called Terror in the Dark was released in 1991 (written by Graeme Davis and Carl Sargent), adding new monsters, treasures, and spells. The included quest, called the "Quest for the Lichemaster", featured the heroes being pitted against the Lichemaster, a powerful necromancer. The 96-page expansion rulebook incorporated material previously published in White Dwarf issues 138 and 139.

Contrary to popular belief, the Lichemaster did not appear in the original HeroQuest game. Instead, this character is loosely based on Heinrich Kemmler, a necromancer from the Warhammer Fantasy Battle Lichemaster campaign.

=== White Dwarf supplements ===
Several articles and quest scenarios for Advanced Heroquest were published in White Dwarf magazine between issues 121 and 159 to support and expand the core rules.

- WD 121: "The Quest for Sonneklinge" (Andy Warwick) – quest scenario and the Jade Wizard's spell book.
- WD 122: "The Priests of Pleasure" (Andy Warwick) – quest scenario.
- WD 125: "The Dark Beneath the World" (Andy Warwick and William King) – a crossover adventure featuring characters Gotrek and Felix and the Amethyst Wizard's spell book.
- WD 134: "The Trollslayer's Oath" (Ken Rolston) – quest scenario.
- WD 138: "Henchmen" (Graeme Davis, Robin Dews, and Carl Sargent) – new rules for Dwarf Trollslayers, Elf Wardancers, Human Captains, and Wizard's Apprentices; later incorporated into Terror in the Dark.
- WD 139: "Treasure" (Graeme Davis, Carl Sargent, and Robin Dews) – expanded treasure lists and the Light Wizard's spell book; later incorporated into Terror in the Dark.
- WD 145: "The Eyes of Chaos" (Carl Sargent) – quest scenario.
- WD 150: "The Changing Faces of Tzeentch" (Dominic Camus and William King) – quest scenario.
- WD 159: "Rivers of Blood" (Carl Sargent) – quest scenario.

== Reception ==
In the January 1990 edition of Games International (Issue 12), Philip A. Murphy's original impression was that this was exactly the same game as the original HeroQuest, albeit produced by Games Workshop rather than Milton Bradley. Nevertheless he admired the production values, calling all the components "a true delight and all other producers [...] could learn a lesson from GW's attention to quality components." However, Murphy did not like "the constant references, by word and image, to Warhammer this, Warhammer that, Citadel miniatures, Citadel paints, future supplements and White Dwarf magazine." While he felt that the original game by Milton-Bradley "had been rushed out of production [...] and could have been much better with more playtesting", Murphy felt that Advanced Heroquest had the opposite problem, calling it "overproduced and a tad too complex." He concluded by giving the game an average rating of 3 out of 5, saying "it should be magnificent, and indeed at times it is. But just as often, it's a great disappointment."

Reviewed in the February 1990 issue of Sinclair User Precinct 19 column, the magazine described Advanced Heroquest as a "nice bridge" between casual board games and "hard-core RPG fanatic" games. They also noted that the game treated the Game Master as "much more of an adversary against the players, rather than adopting the traditional role of guiding the players". They also praised its "Fate" point mechanic, which served as a necessary "safety net" to prevent early player death in the more complex and lethal system.

Writing in the May/June 1990 issue of the French games magazine Casus Belli, Tristan Lhomme noted that Advanced Heroquest was a "distant cousin" to the original game rather than a direct successor. It replaced the fixed board and cards with a "noticeably more complex" dice-based system for continuous map generation. Lhomme described the game as a "role-playing game simulation" that successfully recreated the atmosphere of early Dungeons & Dragons (specifically Advanced Dungeons & Dragons), but he felt that despite the well-designed rules and "deadly traps," it ultimately lacked the variety of a full role-playing experience.

A review in the French magazine Micro News (1991) highlighted the game's luxurious production and meticulous English rules. It mentioned the rules had been translated into French. However, the French translations often summarised the complex documentation into a few pages, omitting the original folklore and world-building. They highlighted that the layout of each explored dungeon and the location of the monsters are "randomly generated" during the quest. Therefore, no two games are ever the same. And the combat system was thorough and likely suitable to use within role-playing games like Dungeons & Dragons. Because it enables combat with various equipped weapons, ranged attacks, and the use of magical powers.

The German website Spielphase gave the game a rating of 5 out of 6, saying, "You get a lot of material for your money. [...] Even if I'm not a big fan of role-playing games or thematically related board games, I have to acknowledge that a reality is represented quite well by tables and a varied game is possible over a long period of time."

In a 2018 retrospective for Retro Gamer, the magazine mentioned that the Advanced Heroquest 1989 release was "far more complicated" than the MB HeroQuest version due to its "RPG-like rules". They also mentioned it had better quality components, though they criticised the base game's lack of monster variety – as all the enemies were "Skaven".

== See also ==
- HeroQuest
- Warhammer Quest
