= Codex: Imperial Guard =

Game supplement

First edition, cover art by David Gallagher, 1995

Codex: Imperial Guard is a supplement published by Games Workshop (GW) in 1995 for the tabletop miniatures wargame Warhammer 40,000.

== Contents ==
Codex: Imperial Guard is divided into several sections:

- Army List lists the units that can be used in an Imperial Guard army. This section also includes special rules, and details things such as weaponry, equipment and special forces, as well as a new "Orders" system.
- Background details how regiments of the Imperial Guard are recruited and organized, and also outlines the history of some famous regiments.
- Special Characters contains the backgrounds and details of notable characters.
- Hobby outlines how Imperial Guard units should be painted.

== Publication history ==
GW first published Warhammer 40,000 in 1987. A second edition quickly followed. as well as a number of supplements. One of these was Codex: Imperial Guard, a 112-page softcover book designed by Rick Priestley with contributions by Andy Chambers, Jervis Johnson, and Ian Pickstock, with interior art by John Blanche, Wayne England, Mark Gibbons, and Des Hanley, and cover art by David Gallagher, published by GW in 1995. As Warhammer 40,000 evolved, this book was revised and republished a number of times, the latest being a 5th edition in 2009.

== Reception ==
Patrick Eibel graded the various sections of the book from A+ to B, and concluded, "These changes have not stripped away the core identity of an Imperial Guard army: its masses of infantry and numerous tanks. In fact, these qualities have been greatly enhanced and improved."

In Issue 2 of Arcane, Mark Donald called this book "An essential purchase for any budding Great Commander with delusions of grandeur." He concluded by giving the book an above average rating of 8 out of 10.

In Issue 19 of Backstab, Timbre Poste noted that the 3rd edition of this book attempted to simplify some of the previously published rules, and "From a practical point of view, you will find far fewer characters here than in the previous versions." Poste also commented on the strong offense but weak defense of the Guard, saying, "Every place where you deploy an army will be a real butcher's shop, although you often risk being yourself cut into hamburger and chops." Poste concluded by giving the book a rating of 6 out of 10.
