= HeroQuest =

1989 fantasy-RPG-themed board game (re-released 2021)

High Adventure in a World of Magic
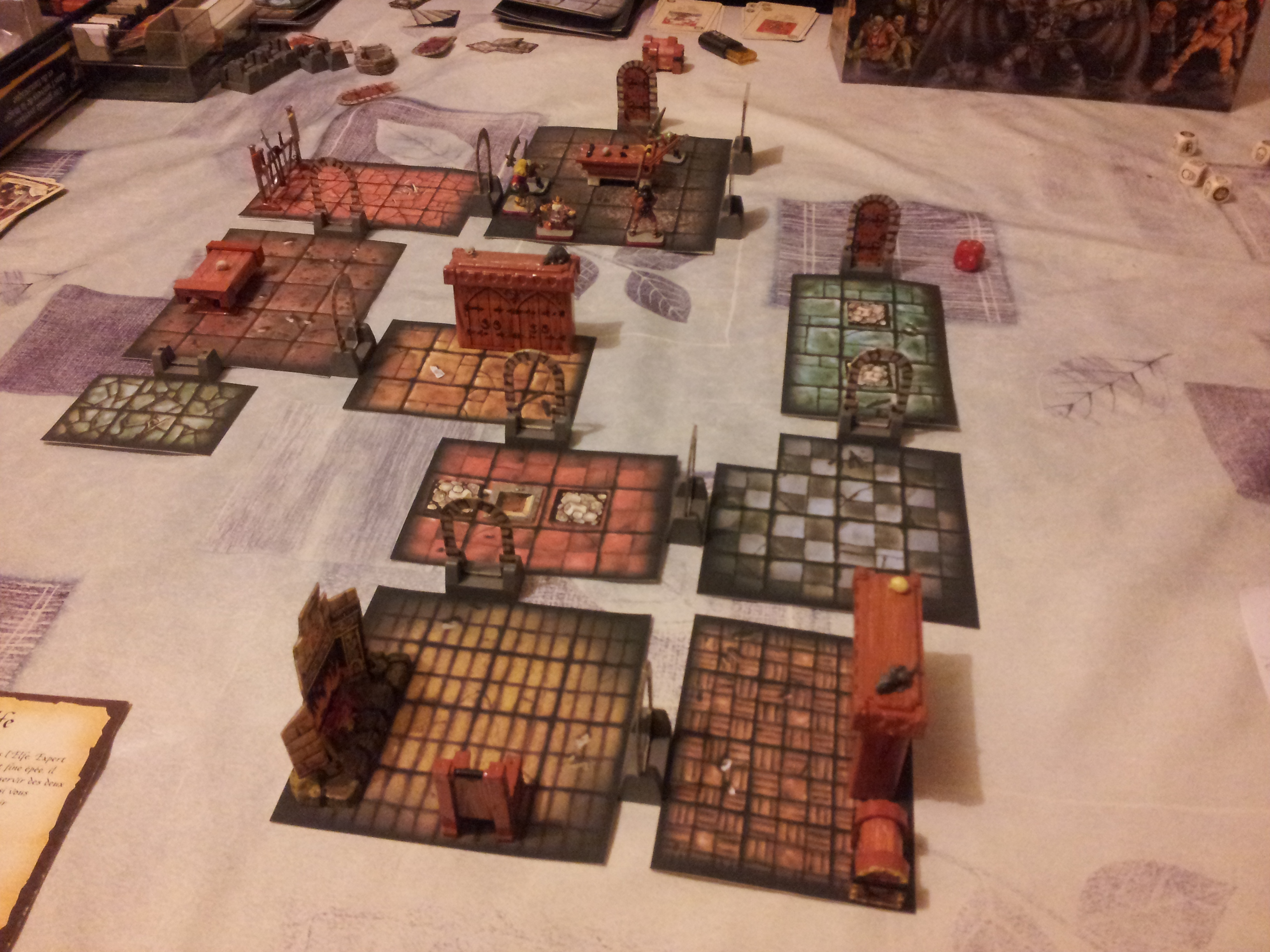
- Designers: Stephen Baker
- Illustrators: Gary Chalk; Nikki Dawes; Max Dunbar; Les Edwards
- Publishers: Games Workshop; Milton Bradley; Hasbro; Avalon Hill (2020–present)
- Years active: 1989–1997, 2020–present
- Players: 2–5
- Playing time: c. 90 minutes
- Chance: Dice rolling

HeroQuest is an adventure board game created by the American board game manufacturer Milton Bradley in conjunction with the British company Games Workshop in 1989, and re-released in 2021. The game is loosely based around archetypes of fantasy role-playing games: the game itself was actually a game system, allowing the gamemaster (called Morcar in the United Kingdom and Zargon in North America) to create dungeons of their own design through using the provided game board, tiles, furnishings and figures. The game manual describes Morcar/Zargon as a former apprentice of Mentor, and the parchment text is read aloud from Mentor's perspective. Several expansions have been released, each adding new tiles, traps, and monsters to the core system; the American localization also added new artifacts.

== History ==
In the late 1980s, game designer Stephen Baker moved from Games Workshop (GW) to Milton Bradley and convinced Roger Ford, Milton Bradley's head of development to allow him to develop a fantasy genre game. Kennedy gave him the go-ahead if he kept the game simple. Baker contacted his former employer, Games Workshop, to develop the plastic miniatures that would be needed in the game, but he then decided to draw on their expertise in the fantasy game field to help develop the game. The result was the fantasy adventure board game HeroQuest (1989), in which the players work together against the gamemaster. The game was released in Britain, Europe and Australia in 1989, and the North American edition, with a different subtitle - Game system, in 1990.

The game consists of a board and a number of individual miniatures and items. The protagonists are four heroes ("Barbarian", "Dwarf", "Elf" and "Wizard") who face a selection of monsters: Orcs, Goblins, Fimir, Chaos Warriors, a Chaos Warlock (which represents many of the named characters for the various quests, such as Sir Ragnar and the Witch Lord), a Gargoyle and a number of Undead: skeletons, zombies and mummies.

In a 1989 interview, designer Stephen Baker agreed that the game was too easy if the players all cooperated, but explained that "The game is really aimed at 10–12 year olds who play with their mums and dads. My feeling is that they play in a very competitive, rather than co-operative way."

Release timeline Milton Bradley releases in Blue Avalon Hill releases in Red Downloadable content: → downloadable content
1989	HeroQuest (Europe)
1989	Kellar's Keep (Europe and Australasia)
1989	Return of the Witch Lord (Europe and Australasia)
1989	Advanced Heroquest (Europe)
1990	Against the Ogre Horde (Europe and Australasia)
1990	HeroQuest: Adventure Design Kit (Europe)
1990	HeroQuest - Advanced Quest Edition (Europe)
1990	HeroQuest - Game System (North America)
1991	Wizards of Morcar (Europe and Australasia)
1991	Kellar's Keep (North America)
1991	Return of the Witch Lord (North America)
1991	HeroQuest (video game)
1991	HeroQuest: The Fellowship of Four (novel)
1992	HeroQuest - Master Edition (Germany)
1992	Barbarian Quest Pack (North America)
1992	Elf Quest Pack / Quest Pack for the Elf (North America)
1992	HeroQuest: The Screaming Spectre (novel)
1993	HeroQuest: The Tyrant's Tomb (novel)
1994	Legacy of Sorasil (video game)
1995–2019
2020	HeroQuest Mythic Tier Offering
2020	Downloadable content: → Rogar's Hall Training Quest
2021	HeroQuest: The Card Game
2021	Downloadable content: → HeroQuest: Companion App
2021	HeroQuest - Game System
2021	Kellar's Keep
2021	Return of the Witch Lord
2021	Heroes: Commander of the Guardian Knights
2021	Downloadable content: → Forsaken Tunnels of Xor-Xel
2022	HeroQuest - "Game System"
2022	Downloadable content: → Try out a New Beginning
2022	Downloadable content: → Into the Northlands
2022	Downloadable content: → HeroQuest Adventure Design Kit
2022	The Frozen Horror
2022	Heroes: The Rogue Heir of Elethorn
2023	The Mage of the Mirror
2023	Downloadable content: → Knight Fall
2023	Rise of the Dread Moon
2023	Heroes: Path of the Wandering Monk
2023	Prophecy of Telor
2023	The Spirit Queen's Torment
2024	Against the Ogre Horde
2024	Jungles of Delthrak
2025	First Light
2025	Joe Manganiello's Crypt of Perpetual Darkness
2026	Wizards of Morcar

The publication of expansion sets was then split between the European and Australasian markets and the North American markets. Starting with Kellar's Keep, released in Europe and Australasia in 1989, and North America in 1991. Kellar's Keep added 10 new quests and a further batch of monster figures (more Orcs, Goblins and Fimir); the American localization also added new items and artefacts. Released shortly after in the same years was Return of the Witch Lord which extended the undead with more skeletons, mummies and zombies.

Advanced Heroquest was a revised and expanded version of the HeroQuest game released in 1989 by Games Workshop. The basic concept is the same: four heroes venture into a dungeon to fight monsters and gain treasure, but the rules are more detailed and complex.

Against the Ogre Horde was released in 1990 in Europe and Australasia, included Ogres, a more powerful monster type, while Wizards of Morcar was released in 1991, themed around the addition of enemy wizards.

1990 saw the release of HeroQuest Advanced Quest Edition (also known by the German version name "HeroQuest Master Edition") with 12 added miniatures ("black guards") with 4 kinds of detachable weapons and a new 13 part adventure "The Dark Company" in addition to the original contents of the basic HeroQuest box.

A HeroQuest Adventure Design Kit was released in Europe in 1990, containing items to help players design their own quests, and an Adventure Design Booklet was published with four sheets of adhesive labels and with an 80-page pad of a new design, larger character sheet. There was also a blank quest map printed in the back of the original game's quest booklet for creative players to make their own adventures.

1992 saw North America release two sets of their own: The Frozen Horror, with a snow and ice theme, featured a female Barbarian, Mercenaries, Ice Gremlins, Polar Warbears and a pair of yeti as well as the "Frozen horror" of the title, while The Mage of the Mirror had an Elven theme: female Elf against an evil Elven Archmage, Elf warriors and archers, Giant Wolves and Ogres.

=== Other media ===
1991 saw the first computer adaption released, the HeroQuest computer game, forcing Sierra On-Line to rename their Hero's Quest series to Quest for Glory. The game included the 14 original quests and the Return of the Witch Lord expansion. A version of the game for the NES was developed to a prototype stage, simply named HeroQuest, but was never released.

A sequel for the Amiga titled HeroQuest II: Legacy of Sorasil was released in 1994. It included nine original quests.

Three HeroQuest novels by Dave Morris were published: The Fellowship of Four in 1991, The Screaming Spectre in 1992, and The Tyrant's Tomb in 1993. The Fellowship of Four novel included a 135-paragraph gamebook 'The Heroquest Adventure Game - In the Night Season'. The Screaming Spectre novel included 'Running the Gauntlet - A Solo Quest for the Wizard' to be played with the HeroQuest Game System and also 'Beyond the World's Edge - A Solitaire Adventure for the Wizard' a 148-paragraph gamebook. The Tyrant's Tomb novel also contained 'A Growl of Thunder - A Solitaire Quest for the Barbarian' to be played with the HeroQuest Game System and 'The Treasure of Chungor Khan - A Solo Adventure for a Barbarian' a 193-paragraph gamebook.

In 1997, Milton Bradley let their HeroQuest trademark lapse. It was subsequently purchased by Issaries, Inc. who used it for an unrelated tabletop role-playing game. This was sold in 2013 to Moon Design Publications who continued to use it for the same purpose, eventually selling it back to Milton Bradley (now Hasbro Gaming) in 2020.

=== HeroQuest remake ===
Under the vision and direction of Jeffrey Anderson, Hasbro Gaming bought the HeroQuest trademark from Moon Design Publications in September 2020. This allowed Avalon Hill, a subsidiary of Hasbro, to launch a teaser website with the HeroQuest logo, art and a countdown timer, leading to speculation that an official remake or app was being produced. On September 22, 2020, the countdown revealed a Hasbro Pulse crowdfunded campaign for $1,000,000 to produce an updated edition of HeroQuest with new figures, Kellar's Keep and Return of the Witch Lord expansions. Funding was achieved within 24 hours, with Hasbro expecting to ship in late 2021. The initial campaign was for US and Canada only, with Hasbro later expanding the campaign to include United Kingdom, Australia and New Zealand. Games Workshop branding and intellectual property was removed, with all art replaced; the "Chaos" moniker changed to "Dread" in all instances; miniatures all received new sculpts; and the Fimir monsters, a type of water-based lizard monster originating in the Warhammer universe, replaced by the fish-based Abomination monsters.

Hasbro Pulse crowdfunded HeroQuest campaign offered two pledge tiers, Heroic or Mythic. Supporters who pledged for the Heroic Tier would receive the HeroQuest Game System with both expansion packs Kellar's Keep and Return of the Witch Lord.

Included were three quest books: Prophecy of Telor by Stephen Baker, The Spirit Queen's Torment by Teos Abadia, and The Crypt of Perpetual Darkness by Joe Manganiello.

Shortly after the crowdfunding campaign, Hasbro made available a PDF of a new quest, Training Quest Rogar's Hall by Stephen Baker.

In November 2021, Avalon Hill announced the very first hero expansion pack, the Hero Collection - Commander of the Guardian Knights. This included two knight figures as well as three knight skill cards and two equipment cards for each figure. It was a limited edition exclusive to retailers and sold out quickly.

Hasbro also released the free to download HeroQuest Companion App, which aids a Morcar/Zargon player, or fills the role of Morcar/Zargon allowing the game to be played either cooperatively or solo.

At the end of 2021, HeroQuest was released to stores, along with two expansions, Kellar's Keep and Return of the Witch Lord. Hasbro also released online quest one: Forsaken Tunnels of Xor-Xel by Doug Hopkin, which connects the core game's quests to the Kellar's Keep expansion.

On April 8, 2022, Hasbro released online quest zero: New Beginnings by Doug Hopkins, which was later re entitled as HeroQuest: Try out a New Beginning.

The summer of 2022 Hasbro released online quest two: Into the Northlands by Doug Hopkins, and the HeroQuest Adventure Design Kit.

In August 2022, the Barbarian Quest Pack expansion was re-released as The Frozen Horror Quest Pack.

In December 2022, Avalon Hill released a second hero expansion pack, the Hero Collection - The Rogue Heir of Elethorn as a prologue to the Elf Quest Pack. This expansion included two rogue elf figures as well as three rogue skill cards and two equipment cards for each elf.

The Mage of the Mirror Quest Pack was released in February 2023 with new elven furniture.

On March 27, 2023, Hasbro announced a new expansion, Rise of the Dread Moon that will include a variant sculpt of the Commander of the Guardian Knight, three clear translucent spectres and four Cadre of the Raven's Veil figures in purple plastic. A new potions card deck will also be included.

A scheduled streamline event officially heralded the launch of ‘HeroQuest - Rise of the Dread Moon’ as the first new HeroQuest expansion in 30 years. Building on the events explored in ‘HeroQuest - Mage of the Mirror’, collaborative partners showcased an original quest revealed as ‘Knight Fall’ and as the catalyst for ‘Rise of the Dread Moon’. The release of ‘Knight Fall’ was made free to download upon the conclusion of the stream.

In August 2023, Avalon Hill released a third hero expansion pack, the Hero Collection - The Path of the Wandering Monk. This expansion included two martial artist Monk figures as well as four elemental skill cards.

In October 2023, Avalon Hill announced a release to retail two 'new' expansions packs: Prophecy of Telor and The Spirit's Queens Torment

On February 27, 2024, the UK expansion Against the Ogre Horde was released. Along with the original 7 quests, this re-released expansion included three new quests, a new game mode (called World’s End Tournament), new druid sculpts and cards, and a new wolf companion sculpt and character card.

On June 14, 2024, a new starter box was announced, First Light, with the goal of providing a cheaper option for new players to purchase the HeroQuest game system. It contains a new quest book and a full reveal was promised at the 2024 Gen Con, and was released on January 13, 2025.

On April 4, 2025, a retail release of Joe Manganiello’s The Crypt of Perpetual Darkness quest pack was announced. This quest pack was previously only available to backers of the 2021 crowdfunded release. Joe Manganiello’s The Crypt of Perpetual Darkness preorders began on May 30, 2025 and it was available in retail by July 31, 2025.

On October 23, 2025, an updated version of the classic expansion Wizards of Morcar quest pack was announced at Spiel Essen game convention in Essen, Germany with a projected release date of March 2, 2026.

== Characters ==
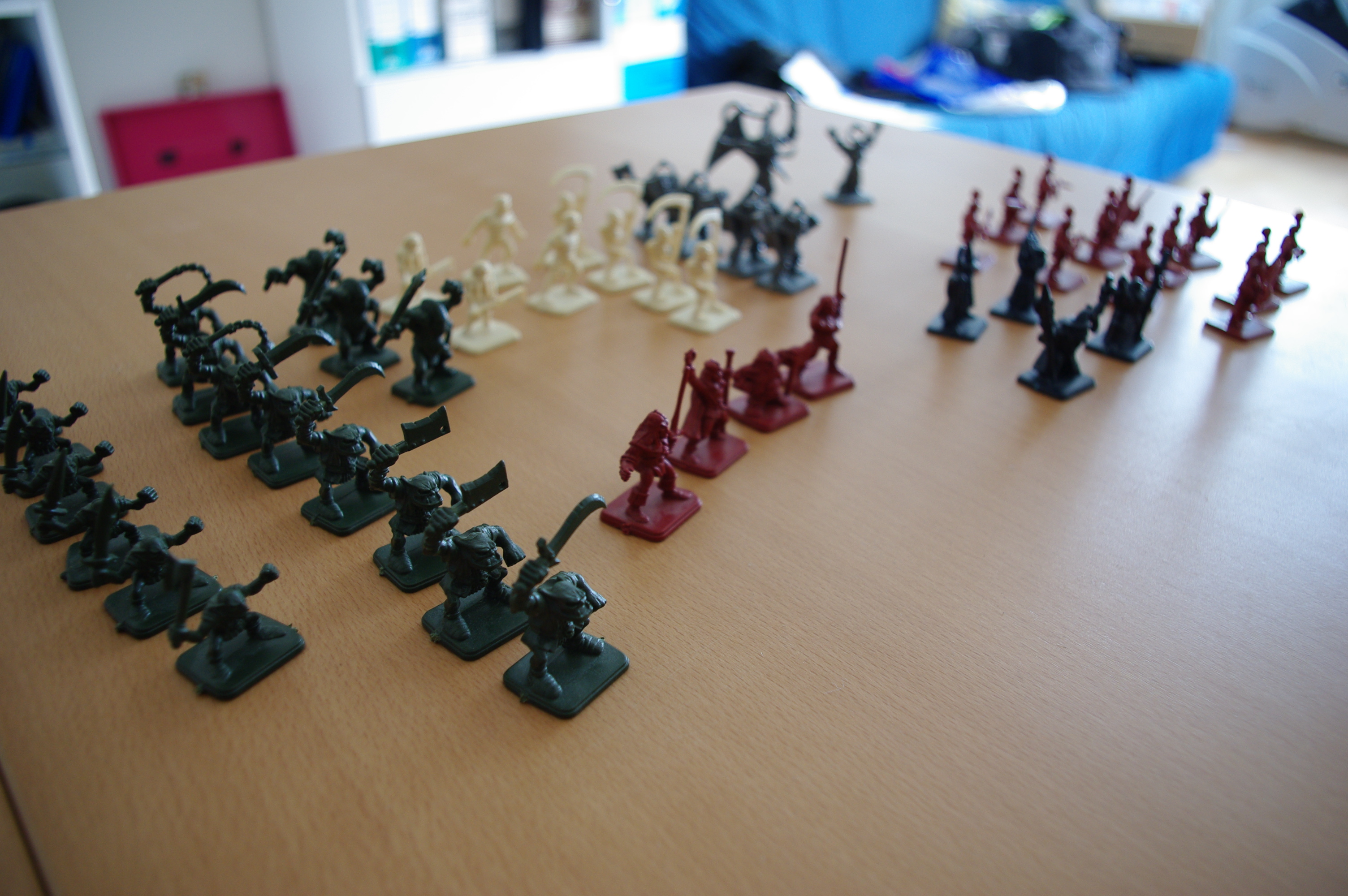
Several HeroQuest figurines representing the different characters of the game

The heroes of the original release are agents of the Wizard known only as Mentor, Morcar/Zargon's former master and keeper of a book called Loretome, which contains all the world's knowledge. The four player characters offer a choice of gameplay. The Barbarian and Dwarf allow a more combat-oriented game, while the Wizard and Elf can cast spells. The artwork and miniatures of each character are standardised, but the equipment stats vary somewhat from this basic portrait.

Barbarian
The barbarian figurine is tall, muscular and equipped with a broadsword. As the strongest in combat, this race also benefits from significant health but lacks magical abilities and is notably vulnerable to magical attacks.
Dwarf
The dwarf figurine is short, stocky and well armored, carrying a battle axe. He is very good in health, but lacks the attack strength of the barbarian and the magical prowess of the elf or wizard. However, the dwarf can boast the unique ability of being able to disarm traps without the need of a toolkit.
Elf
The elf figurine is tall and slender, armed with a short one-handed sword. He is equal in attack strength to the dwarf, but is less physically robust. He is able to use one type of spell element (air, earth, fire, or water magic) and can resist magical attacks more effectively. In the 2021 re-release, the elf figurine is female.
Wizard
The wizard figurine wears a full-length cloak and carries a staff. In combat, he is the weakest in attack and health and is unable to use most weapons and armor, but compensates for this by being able to use three types of spell elements, for a total of nine spells. His greater mind allows him to be the hero most resistant to the effects of magic.

The American localization specifies a starting equipment card for each character: a broadsword for the Barbarian, a short sword for the Elf and the Dwarf, a dagger for the Wizard. In the British original, the characters needed no starting weapon cards.

== Gameplay ==
Empty HeroQuest game board

The game is played on a grid representing the interior of a dungeon or castle, with walls segmenting the grid into rooms and corridors. One player assumes the role of the evil wizard character (Morcar/Zargon), and uses a map taken from the game's quest book to determine how the quest is to be played. The map details the placement of monsters, artifacts, and doors, as well as the overall quest the other players are embarking upon. Quests vary and include scenarios such as escaping a dungeon, killing a particular character, or obtaining an artifact. The evil wizard first places the entry point on the map, usually a spiral staircase, although on some quests the players enter via an external door or begin in a specific room. The map may also specify a wandering monster. This is a monster that may enter the game if a player is unlucky while searching for treasure.

The remaining players select their character from the four available. If both the Wizard and Elf are chosen then the wizard chooses a spell set first, then the Elf chooses a set and the Wizard gets the remaining two sets. If only one of them is chosen, he will freely take the amount of spell sets specified for that character (one for the Elf or three for the Wizard). The players may also start the quest with items collected on previous quests, such as extra weapons, armor, and magic items.

The game begins with the gamemaster reading the quest story from the perspective of Mentor, to set the scene for the game about to be played. Starting with the player to the left of the evil wizard, the game begins.

During a Hero's turn, the player can move before or after performing one of the following actions: attack, cast a spell, search for traps and secret doors, search for treasure. In the British original, heroes can be in competition and even attack each other, whereas this is forbidden in the North American localization.

=== Movement ===
Players roll two six-sided dice, referred to as "Red Dice" in the game manual, and may then move up to that number of squares. A player does not need to move the full amount of the roll and can end movement at any time. Players may move over a square occupied by another player if the occupying player grants permission, but may not occupy the same square. Doors, monsters, and other objects are placed on the board by the evil wizard player according to line of sight. Once placed on the board they are not removed unless killed, thereby providing a steady stream of monsters for the evil wizard player to use.

=== Combat ===
Combat involves special six-sided dice, referred to as "White Combat Dice" in the manual, each bearing 3 "skull" sides, 2 "Hero" shield sides and 1 "monster" shield side. The character players and the evil wizard player use the same dice, but the evil wizard player has a smaller chance of rolling their specific shield. The number of dice used is determined by the basic statistics of the player or monster, whether they are attacking or defending, plus any modifiers due to spells or items being carried.

The attacker attempts to roll as many skulls as possible, and the defender as many shields as possible. If the attacker rolls more skulls than the defender rolls shields, the defender loses body points according to how many skulls they failed to defend. If a character's body point count falls to zero, they are killed and must be removed from the game. If there is another hero in the same room or hall when the hero died, that hero may then pick up all weapons, armor, gold and any artifacts. At the start of the next quest a new hero can be created (in the North American localization only, he will be given back all his items). If the hero dies with no other hero in the same room or hall then the monster collects all items and all are then lost forever.

=== Spell casting ===
The Wizard and the Elf are the only two player characters allowed to use spells, and must choose their spells from four sets of element-themed (Air, Fire, Water, Earth) spell cards, each consisting of three spells. In the North American localization, a further set of 12 "Chaos Spells" is available to Zargon, but the use of those spells is restricted to special monsters. Spells can be broadly split into offensive, defensive, passive varieties with their use and effect to varying degrees. Some spells must be played immediately before attacking or defending, and all require the target to be "visible" to the character using the game's line-of-sight rules. Each spell may only be cast once per quest in the base game.

=== Searching for traps and secret doors ===
There are four kinds of traps in HeroQuest: pit traps, spear traps, chest traps, and occasionally falling rocks. Of these, only spear traps and chest traps do not appear on the board as they are activated only once and then they have no lingering effects. If a pit trap is not discovered and a player walks over it, they fall in losing one body point. The pit will remain in play as a square that may be jumped over. A falling rock trap will cause a rock slide tile to remain in play as a square that must now be navigated around, much like a wall. A quest may also contain secret doors which allow alternative routes to the objective or access to secret rooms containing treasure or monsters.

A player can only search for traps and secret doors in the room or corridor they are currently standing, and only if there are no monsters within the room or corridor. When this happens, the evil wizard character places secret doors, pit traps and falling rocks on the board, while spear traps and chest traps are automatically sprung and deactivated. In the North American localization, the evil wizard indicates where any traps may be and places secret door objects on the map, but trap tiles are only placed onto the board once a hero springs the trap.

The dwarf is the only character that can disarm traps without the aid of the specialized kit which is either bought in the armory or found during certain quests.

=== Searching for treasure ===
In a similar manner, players can search a room for treasure if no monsters are in the room. On some quests, searching for treasure in certain rooms will yield a particularly valuable artifact. More likely, however, the quest will not have specified any treasure for the current location and instead a treasure card is taken. Out of the 25 Treasure Cards, 5 are Wandering Monster cards and 3 are Trap Cards, making a total of 8 disadvantage cards that get put back in the deck when discovered (in the American localization, they are 10 disadvantage cards out of 24 total, making treasure searches significantly more hazardous). There is also a chance that searching for treasure may trigger chest traps that were not disarmed, or cause monsters to attack, usually a Gargoyle already in the room that does not move at first and cannot be harmed until it does move or attacks a hero.

=== Game end ===
The game ends when every player has either returned to the spiral staircase, exited by a door or been killed by the evil wizard. If the objective of the quest has not been accomplished then the evil wizard character wins. Items collected during the quest may be kept for future quests. The quests usually form part of a longer story, especially the quests which are part of the expansion packs.

== Expansions ==
- HeroQuest "Kellar's Keep"
- HeroQuest "Return of the Witch Lord"
- HeroQuest "Adventure Design Kit" (Europe)
- HeroQuest "Against the Ogre Horde" (Europe)
- HeroQuest "Wizards of Morcar" (Europe)
- HeroQuest "The Frozen Horror" / "Barbarian Quest Pack" (North America)

This expansion featured a female barbarian blue hero miniature.

- HeroQuest "The Mage of the Mirror" / "Elf Quest Pack" (North America)

This expansion featured a female elf blue hero miniature. Its name was changed to "Quest Pack for the Elf" in a settlement after Warp Graphics, owner of the ElfQuest trademark, brought suit against Milton Bradley for infringement.

Two expansions (Wizards of Morcar and The Mage of the Mirror) introduce extra spell sets for the heroes, but the Elf will always take one set of three cards and the Wizard always three sets.

== Reception ==
The board game sold over 300,000 units by 1990.

In the August 1989 edition of Games International (Issue 8), Philip A. Murphy thought that HeroQuest "plays simply but effectively" but he noted a few flaws, mainly to do with loopholes in the rules that players can quickly take advantage of. He concluded by giving it an average rating of 3.5 out of 5 stars, saying, "HeroQuest is a good game waiting to be a great one."

In the April 1991 edition of Dragon (Issue #168), Ken Rolston was enthusiastic about this game, commenting that it "scores early and often in toy value and accessibility for young gamers [...] a simple fantasy board game that ingeniously incorporates the [fantasy role-playing game] convention of the gamemaster/referee who confronts a cooperative party of adventurers with deadly traps, monsters, and arch-villains." He did admit that the adventures were pre-programmed, noting that "this game provides none of the broad creative and improvisational impulses that the D&D game provides." He also noted that this was a game for children, saying, "I can’t see myself playing the HeroQuest game with other adults, particularly with FRPG or board-game veterans, unless everyone’s tongue is firmly planted in cheek."

In his 2023 book Monsters, Aliens, and Holes in the Ground, RPG historian Stu Horvath noted, "this game is calibrated for kids and, despite claiming to be cooperative, it truly shines with chaotic chemistry when a bunch of gloryhound eleven-year-olds resort to backstabbing each other to be king of the hill." Horvath concluded, "HeroQuest represents an unprecedented gateway into RPGs and associated hobbies ... [it] clarifies and distills the whole experience of D&D-style RPGs on both sides of the game screen, simply being an approachable, standalone game."

== Awards ==
At the 1992 Origins Awards, HeroQuest won for "Best Graphic Presentation of a Boardgame 1991".

== See also ==
- Dungeon crawl
- Warhammer Quest
- Descent: Journeys in the Dark
- Dungeons & Dragons: The Fantasy Adventure Board Game
- Space Crusade
