= Space Marine (Warhammer 40,000) =

Fictional futuristic supersoldiers

Space Marines
- Warhammer 40,000 character
- First edition Space Marine (Ultramarines chapter)
- First appearance: Warhammer 40,000: Rogue Trader; 1987
- Created by: Rick Priestley

In the fictional universe of Warhammer 40,000, the Space Marines, also known as the Adeptus Astartes, are superhuman warrior-monks who fight for the Imperium of Man. They wear mechanised suits of armour and have modified genomes that grant them superhuman strength and endurance. Some Space Marines have betrayed the Imperium and serve the Gods of Chaos, and are thus known as Chaos Space Marines or Heretic Astartes.

Warhammer 40,000 is a miniature wargame, where Space Marines are one of the playable factions that can be used. They are the best-known and most popular characters in Warhammer 40,000, always featuring in the artwork and starter set of each edition of Warhammer 40,000 and other spin-off games such as Space Hulk and Epic (excluding the 2nd edition Titan Legions), and simpler derivative games such as Space Crusade. Likewise, they are the most popular protagonists in spin-off fiction such as novels and video games.

== Publication history ==
Space Marines were first introduced in Warhammer 40,000: Rogue Trader (1987) by Rick Priestley, which was the first edition of the tabletop game.

The book Realm of Chaos: The Lost and the Damned (Rick Priestley and Bryan Ansell, 1990) was the first book from Games Workshop to give a backstory for the Space Marines. It introduced the original 20 Space Marine Legions as well as their Primarchs. It also first described the Horus Heresy, the civil war of the 30th millennium in which nine of the Legions converted to the worship of the Chaos Gods and rebelled against the Emperor.

Two of the original 20 Legions and their respective Primarchs are not named and are described as "redacted" from the records of the Imperium. Rick Priestley explained that this was to illustrate the Imperium's practice of erasing embarrassing or incriminating events and figures from Imperial records (damnatio memoriae).

To me the background to 40K was always intended to be ironic. [...] The fact that the Space Marines were lauded as heroes within Games Workshop always amused me, because they’re brutal, but they’re also completely self-deceiving. The whole idea of the Emperor is that you don’t know whether he’s alive or dead. The whole Imperium might be running on superstition. There’s no guarantee that the Emperor is anything other than a corpse with a residual mental ability to direct spacecraft. It’s got some parallels with religious beliefs and principles, and I think a lot of that got missed and overwritten.

— Rick Priestley in an interview with Unplugged Games, December 2015

== Tabletop games ==
The following tabletop games from Games Workshop use miniature models of Space Marines:

- Warhammer 40,000
- Kill Team
- The Horus Heresy
- Space Hulk (discontinued)
- Space Crusade (discontinued)
- Epic: Armageddon (discontinued)
- Legions Imperialis

=== Warhammer 40,000 ===
As far as non-hero infantry go, Space Marines are rather powerful and have a high point cost. A Space Marine Intercessor is worth 20 points, whereas a normal human soldier is worth only 4 points. Consequently, an army based on Space Marines will be relatively small compared to, say, a Tyranid army of equal strength. This means that a player can assemble a functional army for relatively little money and effort. In terms of playing style, a Space Marine army neither excels nor fails at any particular tactic, though certain Chapters do have variant rules (e.g. the Salamanders specialise in flamethrowers). Individual units are typically not strongly specialised and can roughly substitute in other roles, meaning most mistakes and setbacks are easy to compensate for. Their tough armour and generally unspecialised weaponry means that they do not have to be manoeuvred as carefully as units of other armies (such as the powerful but frail Aeldari). These qualities make them ideal for beginners, and may help them succeed more often in their early gameplay stages.

=== Kill Team ===
Much like in Warhammer 40,000, Space Marine teams in Kill Team tend to be small teams of powerful warriors. For instance, a Space Marine team will consist of six warriors, whereas an Imperial Guard team will consist of 10 to 14 warriors.

=== The Horus Heresy ===
Space Marines in The Horus Heresy are the most widely featured faction, with the original 18 Space Marine Legions represented in a great variety of standard Legion units (accessible to virtually everyone), supplemented by unique specialty Legion rules and units. In comparison to Warhammer 40,000, Horus Heresy-era units tend to be larger, to represent the epic extent of the conflict. Players are also required to declare their allegiance, whether they are loyal to the Emperor of Mankind (Loyalist), to the Warmaster Horus (Traitor), or occasionally, something else (Blackshields + Shattered Legions).

Each Space Marine unit's combat capabilities and resiliency vary widely in The Horus Heresy. Basic Tactical Marines tend to be more expendable, with a very low cost and modest weapons and armour, while Elite units, such as the Emperor's Children Palatine Blades, Ultramarines' Invictarus Suzerains, or Sons of Horus Justaerin tend to be very resilient and powerful (but consequently more expensive) compared to their more mundane counterparts. Horus Heresy Space Marine units also tend to be less general in tactical function, with units such as Tactical Support Squads and Recon Squads dedicated to virtually a single purpose on the battlefield, compared to the more mixed units of the Warhammer 40,000 era.

=== Space Hulk ===
In Space Hulk, Space Marines in Terminator armour move through narrow corridors fending off attacks by alien monsters known as "genestealers". Genestealers are faster and stronger than Space Marines but limited to melee attacks only, whereas the Space Marines possess both ranged and melee weapons.

=== Legions Imperialis ===
In Legions Imperialis, Space Marines are one of two playable factions. They may be painted as either loyalist or traitor. This is at a 6-millimeter scale. This force may be supplemented with titan legions.

== Miniature design ==
A limited edition model, based on Bob Naismith's early concept. Note the air tube connected to the underside of the helmet.

A Space Marine Terminator (Blood Angels chapter). This particular one was made for Space Hulk.

Concept art for a 2nd edition Chaos Space Marine of the Emperor's Children Legion (Jes Goodwin, 1990)

The archetypal Space Marines in game lore and miniature variety don protective exosuits known as Power Armour. Bob Naismith created the initial design of these Space Marines for the first edition, with the helmet having a gas mask with an airtube connected to the snout, and this was used for a pre-Rogue Trader limited release model, and later re-released in 1991. However designers at Games Workshop felt that this concept was too banal and derivative, and they made a conscious decision to give the Space Marine, and Warhammer 40,000 in general, a "medieval-in-space" aesthetic, so the exosuit was redesigned to resemble medieval plate armour. The helmet was modified to resemble a medieval hounskull helmet with prominent conical snouts, popularly known as the "beaky" helmet (in-universe it is called Mark VI Corvus Power Armour). Jes Goodwin redesigned the Power Armour for the second edition (1993), where the helmet's beak was replaced by a flat grill, and the chestplate features a winged skull (known in lore as Mark VII Aquila Power Armour); this armour design would be continue to be used for the third through to the seventh editions. The differences in the various Marks of Power Armour are cosmetic and have the same attributes for in-game purposes, and Space Marines with these types of armour are collectively known as the 'Firstborn' since the eighth edition onward.

With the eighth edition (2017), Games Workshop introduced the Primaris Space Marine models with a new type of Power Armour (known in lore as Mark X Power Armour). The Primaris Marines are taller and have a new helmet design compared to existing Marines in earlier types of Power Armour (retroactively known as the 'Firstborn'). In-game, Primaris Marines are distinct units with different attributes compared to Firstborn Marines (all Firstborn marines are considered equivalent units regardless of the edition of their Power Armour design); also Primaris Marines have their own accompanying vehicles as they are not compatible with those of the Firstborn. Firstborn and Primaris miniatures were sold alongside each other between 2017 and 2023 for the eighth and ninth editions, however many Firstborn sets have been discontinued coinciding with the release of the tenth edition. This decision by Games Workshop to retire Firstborn miniatures via planned obsolescence is controversial, as Primaris Marine units have better in-game abilities than their Firstborn counterparts for a given points cost, and longtime players who have collected large Firstborn armies have complained that they are being forced to purchase Primaris miniatures in order to remain competitive at official Games Workshop tournaments.

Space Marine Terminators first appeared in 1989 for the spin-off board game Space Hulk and were eventually included in army lists for the battlefield Warhammer 40,000 game. Compared to regular Marines in Power Armour, Terminators don a bulkier kind of armour that provides heavier protection and carry stronger weapons (some of which are incorporated as part of the Terminator suit), making Terminators particularly suited to close quarter battle environments such as boarding enemy spaceships. The Terminators included in the Space Hulk sets have always been plastic, however for Warhammer 40,000 2nd edition only metal Terminator miniatures were initially offered, until a plastic Terminators set (same as included for the Space Hulk 2nd edition box set) was made available for sale in July 1997. For subsequent editions of Warhammer 40,000, all Terminator miniatures have been offered in plastic as Games Workshop transitioned away from metal miniatures. The 3rd edition featured unique plastic Terminators designed specifically for Space Hulk, instead of being shared with the sets for the tabletop game Warhammer 40,000. The current style of the Terminator (known in-game as Indomitus Pattern Terminator Armour) debuted in 1989 and has been retained through successive editions of Warhammer 40,000, although the latest iteration of Terminators for the 10th edition "Leviathan" have been enlarged to keep pace with the Primaris Marines.

Space Marine Scouts initially appeared in 1989, and then received a significant overhaul in 1997 which was one year before the release of the third edition, and the latter design has continued through to the seventh edition. Marine Scouts wear Scout Armour, which is not a full exosuit and provides lesser protection compared to the Marines' Power Armour and Terminator Armour, however that facilitates the Scouts' role of infiltration and skirmishing.

Simplified miniatures of Space Marines in Power Armour, Space Marine Scouts, and Space Marine Terminators are found in the board games Space Crusade and Tyranid Attack.

The Space Marine Dreadnought, often confused as an extra-large fighting suit or robot, is actually a powerful cyborg battle walker with a mortally wounded Marine entombed permanently inside the sarcophagus. The second iteration of the Dreadnought (known in lore as the Castraferrum Pattern Mark V Dreadnought) has been produced since 1993, initially in metal for the 2nd edition and plastic for subsequent editions of Warhammer 40,000, but has been discontinued as of 2023 as part of the winding down of the Firstborn Marine miniatures. The third iteration of Dreadnought (Redemptor Dreadnought) made its debut in the 8th edition as part of the Primaris Marine model range.

The Space Marine's iconic main battle tank and transport, the Land Raider, is based upon the British Mark series of tanks in World War One with its rhomboidal hull and sponson armament. For Warhammer 40,000 all variants been produced as plastic kits, the first iteration (Mark I) appeared in a 1987 Rogue Trader book, while the second iteration (Mark III) was released in 1998 and this design continues to be available as of 2023.

== Fictional characteristics ==
A Space Marine is stronger, tougher, heavier and taller than a normal human due to genetic augmentation. Space Marines are relatively few in number, because their production cannot be scaled up, and so make up only a small minority of the Imperium's armed forces. A Space Marine is created by implanting "gene-seed" in a human recruit, which transforms them into superhuman soldiers by severely altering their organism. Gene-seed cannot be mass-produced in factories. New gene-seed grows within the bodies of the Space Marines themselves and is periodically harvested by surgery to implant in new recruits. Fully developed Space Marines have two functioning hearts, three lungs and an additional kidney in order to sustain their improved metabolism, together with a series of other genetically engineered organs that serve various purposes. Most chapters prefer to recruit boys in early adolescence, as younger recruits suffer fewer complications in the transformation process; but adults can be recruited up to middle age. Space Marines also cannot procreate sexually as humans normally do as their genetic modifications make them sterile.

Space Marines wear suits of mechanised armour, which has a medieval aesthetic where heraldry is often brightly painted and ornately decorated (camouflage, while still useful in warfare of the far future, offers little to no benefit for Astartes who are best used as shock troops and in direct assaults), with several types depending on their rank/experience and combat roles. New recruits start with Scout Armour (known as "Space Marine Scouts") to prove themselves in infiltration/skirmish roles. Those that successfully pass all tests become full-fledged Marines, earning the right to wear a suit of Power Armour which is environmentally sealed and cybernetically enhanced, and which provides a balance of resistance against most anti-infantry firepower while retaining quick reflexes making them flexible for numerous frontline situations. The typical weapon of the Space Marine is the boltgun, a form of gyrojet weapon but with a recoil strong enough that normal humans cannot normally wield one, while squad leaders and heroes have access to rare weapons such as the power sword which are treasured as relics. The most experienced veterans who are named to their Chapter's First Company may don the powerful but rare Terminator Armour (these are known as "Terminators"), which is nearly impervious to all but the strongest attacks from enemy troops. Terminators also carry more powerful weaponry (some of which are incorporated as part of the Terminator suit), such as the power fist (or power glove) which is an oversized gauntlet that is very powerful in melee (although slow to strike), which making them suited to close quarter battle environments such as boarding enemy spaceships. However, Terminators are slower and there are limited means to deploy them upon the battlefield (either being transported in the Land Raider main battle tank/infantry fighting vehicle, or being teleported). The Dreadnought, often confused as an extra-large fighting suit or robot, is actually a powerful cyborg battle walker with a mortally wounded Marine entombed permanently inside the sarcophagus. Space Marines can live for centuries and thereby develop vast combat experience, with veterans (Terminators and Dreadnoughts) being the most highly honoured among their peers.

Those Space Marines who are loyal to the Imperium are organised into "Chapters", each usually containing about a thousand Space Marines, led by a Chapter Master. Each Chapter is an autonomous organisation and controls a fiefdom from which it raises funds and recruits. Each Space Marine Chapter is a fully integrated military force, with space-faring vessels emphasising planetary landing/assault (as opposed to Imperial Navy warships for space combat), while Marine vehicles emphasis rapid mobility for rapid deployment (as opposed to the Imperial Guards' equivalents which are typically designed with heavy firepower and/or thick armour at the cost of speed). The Space Marines themselves are dedicated shock troops, while ordinary human serfs serve in support roles such as crewing their ships and maintaining their equipment. A Chapter's headquarters is called the "fortress-monastery". Each Chapter bears a name, such as "the Iron Hands" and "the Dark Angels", and a distinctive paint scheme for their armour (e.g. the White Scars paint their armour white). A Space Marine's commitment to his Chapter is lifelong and they rarely have any kind of personal life outside the Chapter (with the exception of the Salamanders chapter). Space Marines are conditioned to have a fanatical reverence for the Emperor of Mankind.

In the 8th edition of Warhammer 40,000, which was released in 2017, a new type of Space Marine was introduced called Primaris Space Marines. These Space Marines don a new set of Power Armour while also being larger and more resilient than their predecessors (known retroactively as Firstborn Space Marines). The creator of the Codex Astartes, Roboute Guilliman, who was also the Primarch (genetic "father") of the original Ultramarines Legion, had allowed the creation of a new generation of Space Marines after the events of the Horus Heresy. When Guilliman was resurrected ten thousand years later, Legions of Primaris were introduced into the Imperial forces to augment the existing Chapters and create new ones. Primaris Marines are more resilient to the unique gene defects possessed by their Chapters, but not immune to them. As of the 10th edition, recently select Primaris Space Marine chapters have fallen to Chaos. Additionally, Firstborn Space Marines can undergo the procedure (called the Rubicon Primaris) to be transformed into Primaris Marines.

=== Chaos Space Marines ===
The Emperor of Mankind created the Space Marines around the time he founded the Imperium and used them to spearhead his conquest of the galaxy. A few centuries into this campaign, fully half of the Space Marine Legions converted to the worship of Chaos and rebelled against the Emperor. The insurrection was eventually defeated and the Traitor Legions fled Imperial space, but only after catastrophic damage was done to the Imperium. Because Space Marines age at a much slower rate than normal humans, and most of the rebels dwell in realms of Chaos that exist outside the normal flow of time, many of the Chaos Space Marines that fled after the Heresy are alive and continue to wage war against the Imperium over ten thousand years later. Not all Chaos Space Marines worship the forces of Chaos, but all desire to overthrow the Imperium, led by whom they call the "False Emperor."

Chaos Space Marines are organised in their respective legions and warbands. Some Chaos Space Marines dedicate themselves to a specific Chaos God, which affects their personalities and physiologies in specific and extreme ways. For instance, Chaos Space Marines devoted to Nurgle have grotesque, bloated bodies riddled with disease, yet are paradoxically very resilient in battle; whereas Chaos Space Marines devoted to Slaanesh are obsessed with pleasure and beauty, but are hideously deformed and push physical and mental sensation to limits that a normal human would consider to be sheer torture. Chaos Space Marines are far more brutal and cruel than their Loyalist counterparts, often killing and torturing people for the mere sake of it, much to the delight of their Chaos masters. A few of the Chaos Space Marines do not engage in Chaos worship, and instead engage in selfish pursuits such as piracy or establishing their own petty kingdoms.

Although Chaos Space Marines are just as likely to fight amongst themselves as they are against loyalist forces, on occasion they will unite and form a "Black Crusade", with the explicit purpose of defeating the Imperium and slaying the "False Emperor" once and for all. None of these Black Crusades have yet achieved their main goal, but have managed to cause great damage in Imperial space and allowed Chaos forces to steal valuable technology and information from the Imperium.

== Organisation ==
=== Space Marine Chapters ===
When the Emperor created the Space Marines, he divided them into Legions. Each legion had their own specialties and were commanded by one of the 20 Primarchs.

There were 20 legions, but two were stricken from the records and nine turned traitor. Therefore, only nine loyalist legions remain.

From the nine remaining legions, approximately 1,000 chapters have been born, each with their own unique culture and experiences.

According to F. S. Schönberg several legions were based on real-world cultures.

The Space Marine Legions
Legion Number	Name	Primarch	Allegiance	Specialty
I	Dark Angels	Lion El'Jonson	Loyalist	All Rounded. Inspired by the "traditional European knights".
II	Unknown	Unknown	Unknown	Unknown
III	Emperor's Children	Fulgrim	Traitor	Assault, Melee combat
IV	Iron Warriors	Perturabo	Traitor	Siege Warfare
V	White Scars	Jaghatai Khan	Loyalist	Assault, Hit and Run attacks. Inspired by Mongol raiders.
VI	Space Wolves	Leman Russ	Loyalist	Heavy Assault. Inspired by Viking culture.
VII	Imperial Fists	Rogal Dorn	Loyalist	Siege Defence and Offence
VIII	Night Lords	Konrad Curze	Traitor	Terror Tactics, Psychological Warfare
IX	Blood Angels	Sanguinius	Loyalist	Close combat, Assault
X	Iron Hands	Ferrus Manus	Loyalist	Armoured Assault, Mechanised Tactics
XI	Unknown	Unknown	Unknown	Unknown
XII	World Eaters	Angron	Traitor	Melee Assault
XIII	Ultramarines	Roboute Guilliman	Loyalist	All Rounded. Inspired by the culture of "antique Rome and Greece".
XIV	Death Guard	Mortarion	Traitor	Chemical Warfare
XV	Thousand Sons	Magnus the Red	Traitor	Psychic Warfare, Assault
XVI	Sons of Horus/Luna Wolves	Horus Lupercal	Traitor	Close Range Assault
XVII	Word Bearers	Lorgar Aurelian	Traitor	Assault
XVIII	Salamanders	Vulkan	Loyalist	Assault, Civilian Defence/Rescue, use of Flamethrowers and other flame related weapons
XIX	Raven Guard	Corvus Corax	Loyalist	Stealth, Subterfuge
XX	Alpha Legion	Alpharius & Omegon	Traitor	Espionage, Infiltration

=== Rank structure ===
The Space Marines have a Rank system, like many modern and past militaries. There are a total of six ranks. They are, in ascending order:

- Battle Brother is a rank similar to the real-world Private or Private First Class ranks. These are the rank-and-file soldiers of the Space Marines.
- Sergeant ranks above Battle Brothers, and is in command of a Squad. Sergeants are the lowest Command rank.
- Veteran is the next rank, awarded to Marines with considerable experience in their Chapter and assigned to the First Company of said Chapter. Veteran Sergeants are officers in command of a Veteran squad.
- Space Marines with the rank of Lieutenant serve as second-in-command of a Company.
- Captain is the second-highest rank in the Chapter. They are the Commanding Officers of Companies.
- The highest rank in the Space Marines is that of Chapter Master, similar to a General in the real world. They command a whole Chapter.

Space Marines are featured in Ultramarines: A Warhammer 40,000 Movie (2010).

=== Unit structure ===
The Space Marines, like present-day militaries, have a generally clear unit structure. This standardised unit structure was established by the Primarch Roboute Guilliman in the Codex Astartes after the Horus Heresy. The highest level is the Chapter, commanded by the Chapter Master and comprising all the Space Marines in that Chapter. While individual chapters vary in numbers, a standard Chapter has one thousand Space Marines at maximum strength. Inside the Chapter are usually ten numbered Companies, each one hundred strong. The company is led by a captain, who is assisted by two Lieutenants. Inside a Company, there are ten Squads. These are commanded by a Sergeant, and have nine Marines plus the Sergeant.

As well as having 'normal' warriors, each Chapter also uses specialists in four different military occupation specialties:

- Librarians are magicians, who in-universe are called Psykers.
- Chaplains are priests, who are responsible for the morale, spirituality and purity of the Space Marines. In some cases, Chaplains may serve as Judiciars, responsible for executing rule-breakers or those who are impure.
- Apothecaries are medics, responsible for the medical health of Space Marines and collecting gene-seed.
- Techmarines are engineers, responsible for maintaining the Chapter's Armoury.

Though many Chapters comply strictly with these rules, there are some Chapters who do not conform. One major example is the Space Wolves, who have twelve existing Companies of varying sizes, plus a Thirteenth Company which is missing. In addition, some Chapters utilise differing names for ranks (such as the Red Scorpions using "Commander" in place of Captain, and the Chapter Master being "Lord High Commander"), formations - such as the Grey Knights (an elite, secretive order of demon hunting Space marines) calling their Companies "Brotherhoods"and specialties (such as the Iron Hands referring to their Techmarines as "Iron Father"), depending on Chapter traditions. Some Chapters go further in not utilising a certain concept at all (such as the Black Templars having no Librarians whatsoever and the Iron Hands not having a Chapter Master), again depending on their traditions.

== Books ==
Space Marines are featured in numerous science fantasy novels, predominantly published by Black Library, a division of Games Workshop.

== Trademark controversy ==
In December 2012, Games Workshop claimed that any use of the phrase "Space Marine" on content other than their own infringed on their trademark of the term and requested that online retailer Amazon remove the e-book Spots the Space Marine by M.C.A. Hogarth. The row received a lot of publicity during February 2013, with authors such as Cory Doctorow, Charles Stross, and John Scalzi supporting Hogarth. Amazon restored the e-book for sale.

Following the controversy, Games Workshop has increasingly transitioned from using common-language terms, such as "Space Marine" and "Imperial Guard", toward proprietary names such as "Adeptus Astartes" and "Astra Militarum".

== See also ==
- Supersoldier
- Space marine
