= Battlefleet Gothic =

Science-fiction tabletop wargame

- Manufacturers: Games Workshop
- Years active: 1999-2013
- Players: 2+
- Chance: dice rolls

Battlefleet Gothic is a space fleet miniature wargame that was produced by Games Workshop from 1999 to 2013 with Andy Chambers as the primary developer. A spin-off of the science-fantasy setting of Warhammer 40,000, the game has players command fleets of large spaceships belonging to one of several spaceborne factions. Although the wargame's miniatures and rulebooks are no longer supported by Games Workshop, two video game adaptations have been made since its cancellation in 2013.

As in other miniature wargames, players use miniature models to represent warships. The playing field is usually a 4'x6' area that represents an area of space, upon which players place miniature models of planets, asteroids, and other obstacles. Players take turns to manoeuvre their fleets around the playing field with different objectives that help inform decision making. Cunning, strategy, and luck of the dice determines the winner.

Set roughly 38,000 years in the future, the name of Battlefleet Gothic is taken from an in-universe spacefleet of the galaxy-spanning Imperium of Man, assigned to protect the eponymous Gothic Sector from a variety of alien and supernatural foes.

== Overview ==
While the base game of Warhammer 40,000 simulates battles between planet-bound armies and squads expanded upon in other extensions such as Necromunda, Epic, or Aeronautica Imperialis, Battlefleet Gothic instead consists of space battles within the same setting. Players select spaceships from a variety of fleets representative of the various Warhammer 40,000 races. The game as packaged includes rules and background for space fleets of the following factions:

- The Imperial Navy of the Imperium of Man
- Chaos Warfleets, treasonous fleets worshipping the villainous Chaos Gods
- Alien pirate fleets belonging either to the brutish Orks or Elf-like Eldar.

Subsequent additions and expansions published in numerous Games Workshop sources expanded the game to include fleets for:

- Ork "Waaagh!" fleets
- Eldar fleets belonging to either the isolationist "Craftworld" Asuryani or the cruel and despotic Drukhari
- Tau Empire fleets, encompassing both the Tau's own Air Caste and the fleets of their multispecies allies
- Hive-minded Tyranid Hive Fleets
- Undead Necron Raiders

There are also numerous factions of humans that have ships represented in Battlefleet Gothic such as the Space Marine chapters, the Inquisition, Adeptus Arbites, Adeptus Mechanicus, Rogue Traders etc. as well as numerous types of transports that are represented using current Battlefleet Gothic models, Forge World models and the old space fleet models.

Battlefleet Gothic ships are represented by 2-10cm long models. The rules and miniatures were originally available in Games Workshop stores, although reclassification as a "Specialist Game" meant the rulebook was at one time available in PDF format from the official home page. Additionally, Forge World has produced numerous lines of miniatures for Battlefleet Gothic, ranging from models to replace ordnance markers to entirely new vessels.

== Gameplay ==
Every race has a selection of ships to choose from to construct their fleet, and each ship in the game has statistics that cover its capabilities, from its size class and defensive abilities to the various weapons and hangars it has. Each ship is assigned a point cost based on these capabilities; generally a battle will be between fleets of equal total point costs, though more complex multi-game campaigns may have an overarching narrative where individual battles may occur between unequal forces, with varying objectives for players to accomplish.

Players take turns moving their ships and shooting, as well as undertaking more advanced manoeuvres such as ramming, boarding, or disengaging. Each player may perform actions with all of his ships before the turn ends. The turns are divided into 4 phases, the Movement Phase, Shooting Phase, Ordnance Phase, and End Phase.

During the Movement Phase, the player can move his ships across the tabletop. Different ships move at different speeds, and turn at different rates. Smaller escorts (frigates and destroyers) are typically the fastest ships in a fleet. Ships can also choose to go into "Special Orders" at the start of the Movement Phase. Special Orders allow ships to move/turn faster, reload their ordnance, or increase the efficiency of their firing, at the cost of being less able to perform other functions later in the turn (or in other turns); for example, if a ship uses a Special Order to increase power to the engines to turn, the ship's firepower is halved that turn.

During the Shooting Phase players fire their ships' weapons. Weapons are divided into two broad categories: weapon batteries and lances. Weapon Batteries represent massed broadsides of a variety of (relatively) smaller weapons that target an area of space to bracket and hit enemy ships, rather than being precision weapons. Lances represent larger, more precise weapons consisting primarily of massive lasers or plasma beams, and target the enemy ships directly. Ships are protected from incoming fire by layers of void shields, and armour. Enemy fire stopped by a ship's shields generates "blast markers" at that location, a general term to simulate debris, energy discharges and clouds of energised gas. Blast markers disrupt shooting, and slow down ships moving through them. They also temporarily bring down the Shields of any ship in contact with them. Once shields are down, incoming fire strikes a ship's armour. Attacks can also cause critical damage, which covers a wide range of debilitating effects. Among other consequences, weapons can be taken offline, engines damaged, etc. Sufficient damage can reduce a ship to a derelict hulk, or cause it to explode spectacularly if its reactors are breached.

During the Ordnance Phase ships deploy certain types of weapons and attacks that move and fight independently of the capital ships. This typically includes torpedoes, but also includes squadrons of fighters, bombers, and assault boats. Once launched, Ordnance will be represented by separate counters on the board, that act independently once they have been launched from a ship, though some types (such as fighters and bombers) have more freedom to act than others (such as torpedoes). Different types of Ordnance have different abilities and roles, for example bombers can attack enemy capital ships, while fighters are intended to intercept bombers and other fighters. Ordnance ignores shields, but can be stopped by point-defence turrets mounted on most ships. Ordnance can also be targeted by a ship's main weapons; although fragile, they are very difficult to hit, to simulate their small size and high speeds. Ordnance must be reloaded between each use by using a Special Order, before another wave can be launched again.

The End Phase is when damage control occurs. Each ship which is suffering from critical damage can attempt to repair itself. A variable number of blast markers are also removed during each End Phase.

Other advanced rules that are included also allow more complicated actions, such as ramming attacks, Hit and Run attacks and Boarding Actions, through the use of assault boats, teleporters and boarding torpedoes. Boarding can result in fights between crewmen and boarding parties within a boarded vessel, and when successful can cause critical systems in a boarded ship to be destroyed by the boarders. Other advanced rules intended for Campaign play include planets, as objectives upon which attacking troops must be landed, or bombardment (or even planet-destroying Exterminatus) must be performed.

== Battlefleet Gothic: Invasion (supplement) ==
In 2002, Games Workshop released a 36 page supplement which included scenarios, how to make terrain, painting, conversions, a painted ships showcase from the Games Workshop US HQ, boarding actions and a miniatures catalog. USB 0 83746 00021 3. Product code 0021.

== Battlefleet Gothic: Armada (supplement) ==
Games Workshop published the Battlefleet Gothic Annual once a year after the game's release, with the exception of 2003, where the Annual was replaced by a 160-page supplement, Battlefleet Gothic: Armada. Among others, Armada introduced four new Imperial fleet rosters (Battle Fleet Armageddon, Bastion Fleets, Battle Fleet Cadia and the Reserve fleets of Segmentum Obscurus), as well as gathering the fleets previously mentioned into an official rulebook with updated fleet lists.

== Battlefleet Gothic: Leviathan (digital version) ==
A digital version of the boardgame for Android and iOS was developed by Grand Cauldron and released in 2016. It featured singleplayer skirmish (single battle) and campaign modes, as well as player vs. player mode. The game was discontinued in 2017.

== Battlefleet Gothic: Armada (video game series) ==
A real-time strategy video game adaptation, called Battlefleet Gothic: Armada, developed by Tindalos Interactive and published by Focus Home Interactive, was released on April 21, 2016.

The sequel, titled Battlefleet Gothic: Armada 2, was released in January 2019, and includes all 12 factions from the tabletop. The sequel is set after fall of Cadia during the 13th Black Crusade, more than seven hundred years after the Gothic War.

== Reviews ==
- Syfy

== See also ==
- All at Sea (ruleset)
- Man O' War (game)
- Space Fleet
- Full Thrust
- Epic (game)
- Aeronautica Imperialis
- Adeptus Titanicus
