= Bryan Ansell =

British role-playing/wargame designer (1955–2023)

Bryan Charles Ansell (11 October 1955 – 30 December 2023) was a British role-playing and wargame designer. In 1985, he became managing director of Games Workshop, and eventually bought the company from Steve Jackson and Ian Livingstone. Ansell moved Games Workshop from London to Nottingham and refocused the company from role-playing games to Warhammer wargame and miniature products, which became very popular.

== Education ==
Ansell attended Nottingham Boys High School and People's College.

== Career ==
=== Asgard Miniatures ===
Following school, Ansell became a miniature sculptor for Conquest Miniatures. In 1976, Ansell, along with Steven Fitzwater and Paul Sulley, founded Asgard Miniatures in Nottingham. Originally the company was managed by Sulley, while Ansell and Nick Bibby created the sculpts, Garry Parsons created the moulds, and Jamie Sims cast the miniatures. During this time, Ansell also published the APA/zine Trollcrusher.

=== Citadel Miniatures and Games Workshop ===
In late 1978, Ansell left Asgard and partnered with Games Workshop to found the company Citadel Miniatures, which would produce and manufacture 25mm historical and fantasy miniatures for games published by Games Workshop. Ansell designed Warhammer Fantasy Battle (1983) with Rick Priestley and Richard Halliwell. Industry-wide, sales of role-playing games began to falter, and the miniatures and wargames produced by Citadel became the company's most profitable line. In 1985, Ansell became the managing director of Games Workshop. Ansell then announced he was moving Games Workshop from London to his hometown of Nottingham, where Citadel Miniatures was located. Additionally, Ansell wanted to change the focus of Games Workshop's house magazine White Dwarf from role-playing games to promotion of Warhammer products. Ian Marsh, who had just become the editor of White Dwarf, disagreed with the proposed changes, refused to move to Nottingham, and resigned as editor of White Dwarf after only four issues. In White Dwarf #77, Marsh's last issue, the first letter of each item in the Table of Contents formed an acrostic that read "SOD OFF BRYAN ANSELL".

Along with Rick Priestley, Alan and Michael Perry, Richard Halliwell, John Blanche, Jervis Johnson, and Alan Merrett, Ansell was responsible for the Warhammer (later Warhammer Fantasy Battle) boom of the mid-to-late 1980s.

Ansell bought out a majority of Ian Livingstone's and Steve Jackson's shares of the company between 1987 and 1989, refocusing Games Workshop on its most lucrative lines – the Warhammer Fantasy Battle (WFB) and Warhammer 40,000 (WH40k) miniature wargames. The company expanded rapidly and in 1991, Ansell sold his shares to Tom Kirby in a management buyout.

=== Foundry ===
Wargames Foundry (originally Bryan Ansell Miniatures Limited) was founded in 1983 as a retirement job for Bryan Ansell's father, Clifford Ansell, who had careers as a mining engineer specialising in dust suppression, in the Royal Navy and as a maths teacher. Wargames Foundry was "up and running very quickly", originally selling ranges of historical miniatures that had been discontinued by Citadel. The Citadel/Games Workshop sculptors Michael and Alan Perry were also "keen" to make historical miniatures for Foundry in their spare time and continued to make more historical figures for Foundry.

After selling his shares in Games Workshop, Bryan moved to Guernsey and founded Guernsey Foundry in 1991 to produce large ranges of Old West, Seven Years' War and Darkest Africa figures.

Around 2000, Bryan Ansell moved to Newark, merged Wargames Foundry and Guernsey Foundry into Foundry Miniatures Limited, and took over the running of the company to produce the largest range of historical and fantasy miniatures in the world until he retired in 2005.

== The "Lead Belt" ==
Ansell's decision to relocate Games Workshop to Nottingham in the 1980s led the area to become the centre of the British wargames industry, known as the Lead Belt.

== Death ==
Ansell died on 30 December 2023, at the age of 68. Games Workshop co-founder Ian Livingstone wrote, "Bryan, Steve Jackson and I set up Citadel Miniatures in 1978 as part of Games Workshop. He was a craftsman and dynamic entrepreneur who drove the growth of GW to the next level. Without Bryan, Warhammer would not have launched."

== Contributions ==
- Laserburn (1980) Sci-fi tabletop rules
- Imperial Commander (1981) expanded rules and background material for Laserburn, an influence on Warhammer 40,000
- Warhammer Fantasy Battle (1983) Author
- Forces of Fantasy for Warhammer Fantasy Battle (1983)
- Statue of the Sorcerer, The (Call of Cthulhu) (1986) Chaosium
- Vanishing Conjurer, The (Call of Cthulhu) (1986)
- Warhammer Fantasy Roleplay (1986) Games Workshop Additional Material
- Green and Pleasant Land supplement to Call of Cthulhu for adventuring in Britain (1987) published by Games Workshop Managing Director
- Titan Legions (1994)
- Street Violence (2003)
- Rules With No Name Bryan Ansell, Editor Keith Pinfold, Foundry Books, 2009, ISBN 978-1-901543-17-9
- Foundry Miniatures Painting & Modeling Guide, Kevin Dallimore, Bryan Ansell, Foundry Books, 2006, ISBN 978-1-901543-13-1
