= Demiurg =

Demiurg may refer to:

- Demiurge, the deity responsible for the creation of the physical universe and the physical aspect of humanity in some belief systems
- Demiurg (Warhammer 40,000), an alien species in the fictional Warhammer 40,000 universe
- Demiurge Studios, a small video game development house
