= Plague Fleet =

Plague Fleet is a 1993 supplement for Man O' War published by Games Workshop.

== Contents ==
Plague Fleet is a supplement in which 17 new ships are included, with rules for the fleets used by the four Chaos powers, the Skaven, and the Chaos Dwarves.

== Reception ==
Geoff McMartin and Chris McDonough reviewed Plague Fleet in White Wolf #38 (1993), rating it a 4 out of 5 and stated that "Overall, I think Plague Fleet is a must-have for those who want to expand their Man O' War games. One can only hope that Games Workshop's next supplement, Sea of Blood, will be as good as this one."
