= Trollcrusher =

British RPG zine

== Trollcrusher ==
Trollcrusher
- Cover of Issue #22
- Editor: Bryan Ansell
- Categories: Role-playing games
- Country: United Kingdom
- Based in: Nottingham

Trollcrusher was a British amateur press association (APA) published in the late 1970s that featured articles and scenarios about fantasy role-playing games.

== Description ==
Trollcrusher was 40 digest-sized pages in length and was originally published by Bryan Ansell in Nottingham. Content included new magic items, new spells, new character classes, dungeons, new monsters, fiction, adventure modules, and discussions. Dave Nalle described Trollcrusher as "about halfway between a regular magazine and an APA". After several issues, Ansell handed over editorial responsibilities to R.O. McLean and John Drake.

== Reception ==
Ian Livingstone, writing for Owl & Weasel, noted, "The first issue has some good contributions from John Norris, Hartley Patterson and Bryan himself and also includes an interesting sub-zine under the title of Blue Dragon Blues."

Dave Nalle, writing for Dragon, thought that this was "very well run. All of the material is clear and organized. There is little space wasted, and there is a lot of information contained in a small area ... There is something here to interest every gamer who is willing to forge his way through the large variety of subjects which are covered." Nalle concluded by giving it an overall rating of 8 out of 10, saying, "Its strength is in what seems to be a sense of purpose, and an obvious determination to communicate clearly, probably mostly due to the efforts of the editors in cleaning up and straightening out the material which is submitted."

Writing in Abyss, Jon Schuller noted "The art and graphics are gruesome, but that is the nature of APAs." Schuller otherwise found little to like, commenting, "As far as I could tell, everything here was either useless babbling or doubtful mechanical manipulation. There was nothing I could really use, though it was interesting to see some discussion of what is of current interest in the UK." Schuller concluded by giving the APA a rating of 4 out of 10, saying, "I can't really recommend Trollcrusher for most gamers, though for those who like the APA format, it might give an interesting alternative view."

== Reviews ==
- Perfidious Albion #15 (p17)
- Perfidious Albion #16 (p16)
- Perfidious Albion #22 (p17)

== Awards ==
At the 1980 Games Day Awards organized by Games Workshop, Trollcrusher placed second in the category "Best Games Fanzine".
