= Royal Blood =

Royal Blood may refer to:

- Royal blood, or royal descent, lineal descent from a monarch
- Royal Blood (band), a British rock duo formed in 2011
  - Royal Blood (album), a 2014 album by the band
- Royal Blood (film), a 1916 American silent film starring Oliver Hardy
- Royal Blood (novel), a 2015 Doctor Who novel by Una McCormack
- Royal Blood (TV series), a 2023 Philippine crime drama series
- Royal Blood (video game), or Gemfire, a 1991 fantasy video game

== See also ==
- Royal Blood-Fresh, a traditional Korean medicine
- Blood Royal, a 1929 novel by Dornford Yates
- Blood Royale, a board game
