= Battle of the Five Armies =

Battle of the Five Armies may refer to:

- Battle of Five Armies, the fictional climactic battle in the novel The Hobbit
- Battle of the Five Armies (board game), a 1975 game that simulates the battle
- The Hobbit: The Battle of the Five Armies, a 2014 film based on the novel
