= Superpower (disambiguation) =

A superpower is a sovereign state able to project its power globally.

Superpower may also refer to:

== Fiction ==
- Superpower (ability), extraordinary powers mostly possessed by fictional characters, commonly in American comic books
- Project Superpowers, a comic book from Dynamite Entertainment

== Games and toys ==
- Superpower (board game), a 1986 political strategy game
- SuperPower, a 2002 political simulation computer game
  - SuperPower 2, a 2004 strategic wargame game
- Super PLAY, a video game magazine named Super POWER from 1993 to 1996
- Super Powers Collection, a line of action figures based on DC Comics

== Geopolitics ==
- Energy superpower, a country that supplies large amounts of energy resources to a significant number of other countries
- Potential superpowers, a state or a political and economic entity that is speculated to be—or to have the potential to soon become—a superpower
- Second Superpower, the concept of global civil society as a counter to the United States

== Music ==
- "Superpower", on Beyoncé's 2013 album Beyoncé
- "Superpower", on X Ambassadors 2015 album VHS
- SuperPower, a musician featured on "Lolli Lolli" by Three 6 Mafia
- "Super Powers", a song on The Dismemberment Plan's 2001 album Change
- Superpowers - a 2022 album by New Zealand musician Alisa Xayalith
- Superpowers, a 2023 song by Daniel Caesar from Never Enough
- Superpowers, a 2026 song by Kasabian from Act III

== Sport ==
- The Super Powers, a tag team in the NWA's Jim Crockett Promotions in the 1980s
- Super Cup (rugby union), an annual international Rugby Union competition, originally called Super Powers Cup

== Television ==
- The Superpower, a 1983 Hong Kong TV series
- The Legendary Super Powers Show, an alternate title for a later season of Super Friends
- "Super Powers" (Homeland), a 2015 episode of the TV series Homeland

== Other uses ==
- Superpower (film), a documentary directed by Sean Penn and Aaron Kaufman about Ukraine and Volodymyr Zelensky
- Superpower (horse), a British racehorse
- Superpower, a natural gas turbine by Boom Supersonic
- Super Power Building, the Church of Scientology's high-rise complex in Clearwater, Florida
- Tetration, in mathematics, repeated exponentiation
- Psychic power, sixth sense, ESP, occult superpowers

== See also ==
- Power (disambiguation)
- Super (disambiguation)
- Mega Power
- Ultrapower
