= IISS Ship Files =

Tabletop Science-fiction role-playing game supplement

- Designers: Bob McWilliams
- Publishers: Games Workshop
- Publication: 1981; 44 years ago
- Genres: Science fiction
- Systems: Classic Traveller

IISS Ship Files is a 1981 role-playing game supplement published by Games Workshop for Traveller, written by Bob McWilliams.

== Contents ==
IISS Ship Files is a book of deck plans for six types of spaceships, presented as being from the files of the Imperial Interstellar Scout Service.

== Publication history ==
Shannon Appelcline wrote that Traveller "made its way into the UK through Games Workshop imports and then through British reprints that began as early as 1979; Games Workshop even put out a few original accessories for the game: IISS Ship Files (1981), Personal Data Files (1981), and Starship Layout Sheets (1981).

== Reception ==
Robert McMahon reviewed IISS Ship Files for White Dwarf #27, giving it an overall rating of 10 out of 10, and stated that "IISS Ship Files deserves full marks for giving the best ship plans for Traveller yet."

William A. Barton reviewed IISS Ship Files in The Space Gamer No. 48. Barton commented that "IISS Ship Files is a strong first offering from Games Workshop's Traveller folks."
