= Dreadfleet =

2011 game from Games Workshop

- Manufacturers: Games Workshop
- Designers: Phil Kelly
- Publishers: Games Workshop ltd.
- Publication: 1 October 2011
- Players: 2–10
- Setup time: 5–15 minutes
- Playing time: 60 minutes
- Chance: Low (Dice)
- Age range: 12 and up
- Skills: Strategy, Probability

Dreadfleet is a limited edition game from Games Workshop. This cooperative game is playable by at least two players and up to a maximum of 10 players. The game was released on 1 October 2011 and is set within the Warhammer Fantasy universe. One player takes command of the Grand Alliance, which is composed of the greatest pirate captains, whilst the other commands the Dread Fleet, a force of undead or daemon-aligned captains and their skeleton crews.

== Plot ==
Sartosa, the homeland of Captain Jaego Roth, is raided by the Dread fleet, killing his family and causing him to go on a quest to destroy Count Noctilus, the leader of Dread Fleet. After a failed attempt to recruit the Empire to his cause, he steals the ship The Heldenhammer from the Cult of Sigmar. Knowing that he needs to find more allies, he raids Zandri, the city ruled by undead king Amenhotep, and sails away with chests full of gold. This angers Amenhotep, who then joins the forces with Count Noctilus, creating the Dread Fleet. With their new funding, Roth recruits The Flaming Scimitar and The Swordfish. The three vessels head back to Sartosa to restock before heading to the Galleon's Graveyard, Noctilus's headquarters.

The trio encounters a sinking dwarfen vessel, and decide to aid the dwarfs. Heading to Barak Varr instead of Sartosa, they manage to recruit a steam-powered Dwarven battleship Grimnir's Thunder. The two forces cross the boundary but become scattered. The ships manage to regroup after fending off the Dreadfleet, and then encounter and recruit The Seadrake. The Grand Alliance heads to the Maelstrom, the source of Noctilus' power, where Roth sacrifices himself to destroy the Dreadfleet.

== The Grand Alliance ==
The Grand Alliance consists of five vessels:

• The Heldenhammer, captained by the leader of the Grand Alliance, Captain Jaego Roth. It fields 180 cannons and hosts the Grand Templus, a large temple blessed by holy powers. It also sports Sigmar's Wrath, a statue representing Sigmar wielding a steam powered hammer used to smash enemy vessels;

• The Swordfysh has the only female captain in the Grand Alliance, Aranessa Saltspite. Aranessa was born without normal legs, and with mermaid-like fluke instead. She later amputated her legs below the knees to get rid of the fluke, and replaced them with two jagged blades of sawfish;

• The Flaming Scimitar is powered by magics and The Golden Magus stands at its helm. He casts powerful magics upon his opponents instead of using traditional weaponry;

• Grimnir's Thunder is the Dwarven battleship piloted by Red Brokk Gunnarsson, a master engineer from the Dwarven seahold Barak Varr. Grimnir's Thunder can launch a dirigible from its decks;

• Seadrake is a High Elven ship, captained by Prince Yrellian. The Seadrake has bolt launchers instead of cannons. Yrellian can call upon his dragon allies to aid him.

== The Dreadfleet ==
The Dreadfleet also consists of five vessels:

• The Bloody Reaver, the flagship of the Dreadfleet, with the vampiric Count Noctilus at its helm and manned by an undead crew. The Bloody Reaver is able to repair itself using wrecked ships. The Count can summon powerful sea monsters to do his bidding;

• Skabrus is an undead sea monster that has been turned into a vessel by Count Noctilus after being killed by Skretch Half-Dead and his Skaven crew, who were devoured by Skabrus and attempted to gnaw their way out, dying in the process, but being resurrected by Noctilus as his undead servants. It is powered by warp energy and fires warp lightning;

• The Curse of Zandri, a war barque commanded by King Amanhotep, a Tomb King. A Pyramid tomb was constructed in its center and is capable of firing focused beams of sunlight, setting its targets ablaze. It also sports five marble Ushabti with great weapons, and uses catapults instead of cannons;

• Black Kraken, the monstrous demon-possessed mechanical squid of Tordrek Hackhart, a Chaos Dwarf. Tordrek holds a personal grudge against Red Brokk Gunnarsson;

• Shadewraith, the ghost ship of the ghost captain Vangheist. The Shadewraith is insubstantial and is capable of flying over the waves, thus making it harder to hit.

== Reception ==
Reviews of Dreadfleet have been mixed. BoardGameGeek.com gave Dreadfleet 7.0 out of 10. The game is no longer offered for sale on the Games Workshop site, and all articles related to it are no longer available.

In a review of Dreadfleet in Black Gate, John ONeill said "Vampire lords, zombie sea monsters, undead pirates, strange magics... what more could you ask for?"

== See also ==
- Warhammer Fantasy Battle
- Man O' War (game)
