= Lead belt (wargaming) =

Part of the English East Midlands

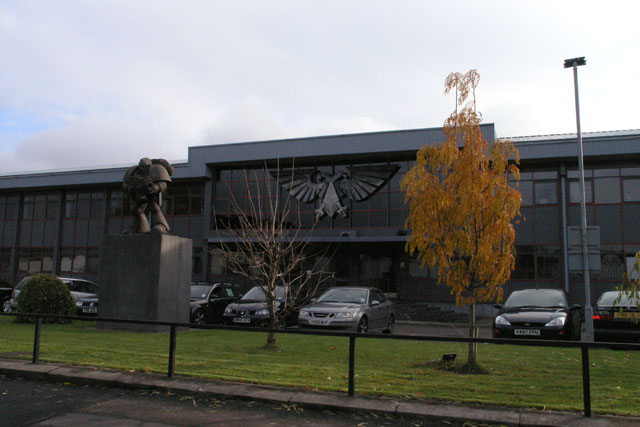
Games Workshop headquarters in Lenton, Nottingham

The lead belt is a name given to part of the English East Midlands, including Nottingham, because of the number of wargames manufacturers based there. A key factor is the location of Games Workshop, the biggest wargames miniature manufacturer in the world. Games Workshop was brought to Nottingham by Bryan Ansell in the early 1980s. Ansell had previously founded Citadel Miniatures at Newark, Nottinghamshire in 1979. Many former Games Workshop staff have gone on to found other manufacturers in the area and the 8–10 companies in the lead belt account for 90% of the British wargames miniature market. Because of the concentration of wargaming businesses the lead belt is the subject of organised tours for wargamers from North America.

== Origins with Citadel and Games Workshop ==
From 1979 Newark, Nottinghamshire was the home of Citadel Miniatures, a wargames miniature manufacturer run by Bryan Ansell, Ian Livingstone and Steve Jackson. Livingstone and Jackson, with John Peake, had founded Games Workshop in 1975 as a distributor of American-made games such as Dungeons & Dragons. Citadel originally made mainly historical miniatures but a fantasy game, Warhammer, was developed for Games Workshop in 1983 by Ansell, Rick Priestley and Richard Halliwell. It proved popular, driving sales of Citadel's fantasy range, and Ansell led a management buyout of Games Workshop.

Ansell considered moving his family and business to Games Workshop's base in London but after viewing the company's premises in Hammersmith they decided not to and instead moved Games Workshop to Nottinghamshire. Ansell's workforce grew from 13 to 200 quickly. He incorporated Citadel as a brand within Games Workshop and moved to a larger site at Eastwood, Nottinghamshire by the mid 1980s. The company also rented four warehouses at Giltbrook and opened design studios in Nottingham Lace Market. Ansell sold Games Workshop to his general manager Tom Kirby in 1991 and he moved its head office to Lenton, Nottingham in 1997. It has since expanded to a global company and the biggest in the industry; by 2015 Games Workshop had an annual turnover of £119m, employed 1,650 staff and operated 400 shops. The company expanded further in 2020 with the construction of a new 177,500 square feet (16,490 m^{2}) warehouse at the SEGRO Logistics Park East Midlands Gateway in nearby Castle Donington, Leicestershire. This was established as their main distribution hub, on a 15-year lease.

Games Workshop produces only fantasy and science fiction miniatures. Some of its designers have interests in historical miniatures and have set up their own businesses to produce these, in their kitchens or garden sheds. As a result, the East Midlands has become a focus of the wargames miniature industry. It has become known as the "lead belt" because early miniatures were made from lead alloys; modern miniatures are often of pewter or plastic (Games Workshop miniatures have not contained lead since the 1990s).

== Other manufacturers ==
Map showing the "lead belt" of Nottinghamshire – click on the link above to see the locations mentioned in the article.

Around 8–10 manufacturing companies are based in the lead belt as well as a number of sole traders. These companies account for 90% of the British wargames miniature market. Associated companies such as mouldmakers, games publishers and magazine publishers are also based in the region. Because miniatures tend to be cast to order rather than held in stock, manufacturers have not found it economic to outsource abroad, helping to keep the focus on the East Midlands. Many of these companies employ former Games Workshop staff, the company forming a pool of talent for the local area.

Ansell's father Clifford founded Wargames Foundry in 1983 to produce historical miniatures. It was taken over by Bryan Ansell in 2000 and is currently based at a converted stable in his home at East Stoke, employing seven staff and selling the largest range of miniature figures in the world. A former Citadel and Games Workshop employee John Stallard founded historical miniature manufacturer Warlord Games from his kitchen table at Ropewalk, Nottingham in 2007. By 2017 it was turning over millions of pounds each year and employed 91 staff. As of 2017, it was based in Lenton and probably the second largest wargames company in the UK. Stallard has said of the lead belt: "Americans in particular are astonished that all the toy soldier companies come from Nottinghamshire". The lead belt is a popular destination for wargames tourists from across the world; one Canadian company runs regular tours of the manufacturers in the region. Priestley remained at Games Workshop until 2010 and has since joined Warlord as a consultant. He has said that "practically every single toy soldier company based in the East Midlands is run by people, or substantially run by people, who used to work at Games Workshop".

Other companies in the region include Mantic Games, formed by former Games Workshop managing director Ronnie Renton in 2008, and Perry Miniatures, founded in Bilborough by Alan and Michael Perry, who were Citadel and Games Workshop sculptors until 2014. New Zealand-based company Battlefront Miniatures has a large base in Beeston to take advantage of Nottingham-based experts. Others include Warp Miniatures (independent miniatures manufacturer based in Nottingham), Theme 17, Miniature Figurines (in Newthorpe) and The Assault Group (in Broxtowe). Associated companies include magazine publisher Wargames Illustrated in Beeston and game publisher and distributor Caliver Books in Newthorpe.
