= Full Thrust =

Science fiction tabletop game

Cover of the Full Thrust second edition rule book.

Full Thrust, Polish edition cover

Full Thrust is a science fiction strategy wargame written by Jon Tuffley and published by Ground Zero Games of England. It is usually played with miniature figurines representing imaginary starships, although cardboard chits representing the vessels can also be used. Unlike many games, the publishers encourage the use of any miniatures rather than only "official" ones, though Ground Zero Games does also sell an extensive miniature range.

Full Thrust is one of the most popular games representing starship battles. The game has its own military science fiction/space opera universe. However, the rulebook states that this background is entirely optional; the game is intentionally designed to allow players a high degree of creativity within the rule set. There are also many unofficial conversions to other sci-fi universes like Star Trek (sometimes called Full Trek), Star Wars and Honor Harrington.

== History ==
The most current Full Thrust rules set is generally known as version 2.5, though this is not the title of any official release; it refers to the rules from Full Thrust, Second Edition (1992) as extensively amended by the two Fleet Book volumes (published in 1998 and 2000). Version 2.5 is often played with some rules from More Thrust, the most common being fighter morale. The plain Second Edition rules set is known as version 2, and itself incorporated several changes from the previous, now out of print, First Edition published in 1991.

A Version 3.0 is planned for some time in the future, but no date has been set. However, the Second Edition and the Fleet Books are all available as free downloads in PDF form on the Ground Zero Games online store.

== Plot and universe ==
Although the authors of the game stated that their universe is of second importance to the rules, nonetheless the universe as developed in the rulebooks has been adopted and expanded by many fans.

The official universe is an example of a military space opera with numerous stellar factions fighting for control of the known space. The main political entities include four major human powers, dozens of smaller human powers and three alien races. The game is set around the year 2188.

Major human empires:

- NAC — The "New Anglian Confederation" was formed in 2057. The NAC colonies fall under a constitutional monarchy. Their Royal Space Navy descended from the British Royal Navy, and is an amalgam of former British, Canadian and United States forces. Their official language is English and their capital is on the planet Albion. Their symbol is a stylized "A" shape with three bars of red, white and blue in the center.
- NSL — The "Neu Swabian League" was formed in 2101 after the split of the European Space Force. Their official language is German and their navy is known as the Kriegsraumflotte. Their capital is located on the planet Neu Salzburg. Their symbol is a stylized black eagle with spread wings on a field of red.
- FSE — The "Federal Stats Europa" (aka "Federated States of Europe") was formed in 2101 after the split of the European Space Force. Their colonies fall under a democratic council core government. Their official language is French and their space navy is known as L'Astromarine des FSE. Their symbol is stylized gold bull's head with a gold star between the horns upon a field of blue.
- ESU — The "Eurasian Solar Union" was formed in 2079. Their colonies fall under a primarily communist republic government made up of an amalgam of former Russian and Chinese societies. Their naval fleet, literally Military Space Fleet is known as Voyenno-Kosmicheskiy Flot in Russian and Taikong Jiann Dwee in Chinese. Their capital world is Nova Moskva. Their symbol is a red star with a gold edge on a red field.
- IJSN — The "Imperial Japanese Star Navy" was formed in 2108 with the threat of war from the ESU and the need to expand territory in search for resources. Their official language is Japanese and their writing is the Kanji script. Their naval command structure has fallen from the long-standing corporate structure back to the military doctrine. The capital world is Nihhon Prime. Their symbol of a rising red sun with red sun beams over a white background.

Minor human powers — There are also many smaller powers, such as Free Cal-Tex, the Pan-African Union, the League of Latin American Republics, etc. Other human powers also include various mercenary units allied to the highest bidder and numerous smuggling and pirate gangs operating within and outside the territories.

Alien species:

- Kra'Vak — The Kra'Vak, (their name translated as "People of the Sorrow Killer"), are clan-based bipedal anthropoids with a mix of reptilian and insectoid features. They communicate with a guttural language that is hard for humans to comprehend thus making relations with them very difficult. Relations are complicated further by the fact that Kra'vak pass through several gender and behavioral stages as they age which make them somewhat unpredictable as members of one stage are more aggressive and territorial than those in another stage. Kra'vak technology is similar to humans, but in some cases they are not as advanced. They favor powerful non-energy based weaponry such as railguns and missiles, and they also lack shield technology.
- Sa'Vasku — The Sa'Vasku are extremely long-lived semi-aquatic lifeforms resembling giant nearly-immobile jellyfish. They are an ancient race that has seen many space-faring species rise and fall. Little is known of their race except for the fact that they seem obsessed with balance and are fearful of change. They believe young space-faring races like humans are too naive to be left unchecked and they ruthlessly oppose their expansion into space. Sa'Vasku technology is biosynthetic and their spaceships are alive, genetically created and grown for specific purposes. Their construct ships are equipped with various "weapon organs" that generate energy beams or launch spore projectiles.
- Phalon — The Phalons are a carbon-based, oxygen-breathing species, somewhat humanoid in physique however they have multi-jointed limbs, exoskeletal hides and flat triangular-shaped heads dominated by single tri-lensed eye. They have three sexes, fertile males and females, and a more numerous asexual group that comprises most of their military force. Like the Sa'Vasku, Phalon technology is bio-synthetic in nature however they use genetically grown materials like humans use metal and plastic, building snail-like spaceships that are made from organic components but are not "alive" in their own right. The Phalon thinking-process is similar to humans, and the two species can carry on meaningful conversations, however Phalons are completely amoral. They take what they want without considering payment, and do what they wish without any regard to consequence.

== Overview of game mechanics ==
Full Thrust (FT) uses six-sided dice, or d6, for all combat resolutions. Typically, a game of FT requires many six-sided dice. In the version 2.5 rule set, measurements in FT are based on Movement Units (MU), which can be equal to whatever measurements the players wish to use. Usually they are either inches or centimeters, but this depends on the sizes of the models used and the size of the battle board. Normally, rulers or tape measures are used to measure distances between models, as in most traditional figure-based wargames; FT can also be played on a hex-printed battle board where each 1 inch hex represents one MU, but the rules do not explicitly support this.

FT is a turn-based game: each player secretly writes down their movement orders, then all players move their ships simultaneously or one after another, in accordance with those orders. Combat is played in several phases (missile movement, fighter attacks, direct-fire weapons, etc.). A game may be played until one side is wiped out, or for a set number of turns, but most commonly an explicit objective is set for each side, with victory determined both by this and by the remaining forces at the end of the game, or when one side has taken heavy damage and the player decides to retract their fleet from the game play.

=== Point values ===
For a pick-up game rather than part of a more extended campaign, players build fleets of warships based on point values. Opposing forces decide how many points they will be using before play; larger and more powerful ships cost more points, so this is a reasonable guide to the length and complexity of a battle.

=== Mass factors ===
Each ship has a Mass Factor which represents the size of its hull; all systems (weapons, drives, defences, etc.) must fit inside this. As the ship gets larger, its classification could change. The smallest ships are usually Scouts, Frigates, and Corvettes (9 - 28 mass); medium mass ships are Destroyers and Cruisers (30 - 90 mass); and the heaviest ships are Battleships, Dreadnoughts, and Carriers (up to about 270 mass). The game is capable of handling "Superships" which have Mass Factors over 300. Adding weapons and systems costs points as well as mass.

=== Thrust rating ===
All ships need sublight engines with a Thrust Rating. This number represents how many Movement Units (MU) on the battle map a ship can change its speed per turn. Speed is incremental, so for instance a ship with a Thrust Factor of 3 can increase its speed up +3 MUs per turn: from a speed of 3 one turn, to 6 the next, then to 9 the next, and so on. It can also slow down its thrust rating per turn as well. If it were at speed 9, it would take it 3 turns to slow to a dead stop.

Two movement systems are available: the default "cinematic" system, in which ships move and turn in the style of wet navy vessels as seen in space opera film and television, and the "vector" system which is a rather more realistic representation of movement in space but is somewhat more complex.

All movement of ships is planned ahead of time, before the miniatures are physically moved. These movements are written down on a Movement Orders sheet and kept secret from other players until the turn begins. Players must move their ships as they have written them down on their orders sheet. Movement orders must also include the launching of any missiles and fighters.

=== FTL ===
Most ships also have FTL (faster-than-light) drives; the only ones that aren't in-system defence ships, orbital stations, or "battle riders" brought into combat via an FTL tug.

The FTL is normally used not for tactical but for strategic purposes, allowing a damaged ship or an outnumbered fleet to flee from battle and preserve its remaining strength. Due to the physical nature of the FTL system, it can (in desperation), be used as a weapon itself although it has as much a chance of destroying the ship that deploys it as it does an enemy vessel.

Variant settings, such as the one based in the Star Trek universe (Full Trek), may have different technology rules. In Full Trek, the nature of the Warp drive allows ship-to-ship combat while in warp.

=== Weapons ===
There are several weapon systems available in the Full Thrust game:

Beam weapons

The most common ship weapons are Beam Batteries which have a power level such as 1, 2, 3 (or higher). The larger the number, the farther the battery can fire, and the more damage dice the weapon inflicts.

For every power level of the battery, the beams can fire out 12 Movement Units (MUs) from the ship on the table. A Level 1 battery can fire at a maximum range of 12MU. A Level 2 can fire a maximum of 24MU, and so on. For every 12MU the beam fires, it loses 1 die of damaging power. For instance: A Level 2 battery inflicts 2 dice of damage within 12MU, and only 1 die of damage after that.

Under the Second Edition (Ver. 2.0) of the FT rules, batteries had a letter designation, with Class C batteries being equivalent to Level 1 batteries. Class A was the most powerful until Mega AA batteries were added. Mega AAs could fire the farthest, but had a chance of burning out. In Ver. 2.5 the beam weapon system was refined, and the former class A became class 3, the former class B became class 2 and so on.

In theory, there is now no limit to how powerful a beam weapon can be; for instance, a massive super ship could have a beam weapon of class 10 (or higher), although such an application would be impractical due to the increases of mass and point cost. The ship would have a better chance of inflicting more damage with several smaller weapons instead of one super weapon.

Other systems

Other kinds of offensive weapons include Pulse Torpedoes, Needle Beams (which can target a specific system on an enemy ship and disable it), Submunition Packs, Missiles, Minelayers and "mega-damage" weapons, such as the Nova Cannon and Wave Gun.

Ships can be protected by Point-Defense Systems (PDSs), which are clusters of smaller weapons used to shoot down missiles and enemy fighters. There are also Screen systems to use against beam attacks, though not all weapons are impeded by them; missiles and mass driver projectiles can pass through to the hull, which are why PDSs can be an asset. Some other miscellaneous systems include Reflex Fields (which have a chance of deflecting a beam back at an attacker), Cloaking Fields, and Enhanced Sensors.

Ships are required to include Fire Control sensors in their designs. Without firecons a ship cannot select targets; the more firecons incorporated into the design, the more targets the ship can fire at per turn. A specialised firecon, the Area Defence Fire Control, allows a ship's PDS to attack missiles and fighters aimed at other targets, in the manner of an Aegis ship.

Fleet Book Vol. 2: The Xeno Files added even more weapons including mass drivers, strange alien weapons, and living ships hulls.

=== Fighters ===
If players include carriers in their fleets, they may dispatch groups of fighters into battle. There are many kinds of specialized fighter for different tactical attacks. Interceptors, for instance, have better chances of destroying enemy fighters but have no anti-ship strike ability, while Torpedo Fighters have a heavy one-shot anti-ship punch but are vulnerable to other fighters.

== List of available Full Thrust releases ==
- Full Thrust - published 1991 (out of print).
- Full Thrust: Second Edition - published 1992 (the core rule book).
- Full Thrust: More Thrust - published 1993 (now out of print, this book adds more weapons, ship designs, and combat scenarios to FT). Most of the systems documented in More Thrust were later updated by the Fleet Books; those that remain are not entirely easy to bring over.
- Full Thrust: Fleet Book Vol. 1 - published 1998 (adds new rules for beam batteries, vector movement, new fleet designs, and additional background information to the FT storyline).
- Full Thrust: Fleet Book Vol. 2 "The Xeno Files" - published 2000 (adds updated rules for alien spaceship fleets and weaponry, with more timeline in the official universe).
- Full Thrust: Remixed - published 2008 (revised second edition incorporating the core rule changes from More Thrust and both Fleet Book volumes).
- The Babylon Project: Earthforce Sourcebook (out of print, partly incorporated into the Fleet Books) (Contains a set of space combat rules written by Jon Tuffley, based on his Full Thrust rules).

Ground Zero Games also publish the following wargames set in the same optional background universe:

- Dirtside II (a set of combat rules for planetside battles, mostly dealing with fighting vehicles; playable at the Battalion level).
- Stargrunt II (a set of combat rules for smaller scale planetside battles; typically played at the Company level, with individual units being squads and each soldier separately represented by a model).

All of the out of print Full Thrust books have since been made available on the publishers website.

Ground Zero Games licensed out the Full Thrust engine to British Isles Traveller Support, or BITS.

- Power Projection: Escort Smaller combatant ships from Traveller done in a variant of the Full Thrust Rules, adapted for the Traveller milieu.
- Power Projection: Fleet Full range of combatant ships from Traveller done in a variant of the Full Thrust Rules, adapted for the Traveller milieu. All of the rules from Power Projection: Escort are included, and additional rules are added to cover elements unique to the larger ships.

== Reception ==
Pyramid magazine reviewed Full Thrust for and stated that "Full Thrust, a set of miniatures rules for space ship combat, is one of the few games that surpasses Triplanetary. Nominated for the Origins award on the 1995 ballot, it lost out to Blood Bowl as best miniatures rules. But in my book, it wins hand down. This is by far the simplest and most-playable vector movement rules I've ever seen. Other games may have more intricate rules that return more realistic results, but Full Thrust combines extreme playability with very satisfactory vector movement. In my book, if a system is only 10% as complicated as another system but returns 90% of the realism, the simpler rules system is by far the better one."

== Reviews ==
- Esensja
- Paradoks
- Poltergeist

== See also ==
- Attack Vector: Tactical
- Battlefleet Gothic
- Starfire
- Star Fleet Battles
