= Blood Royale =

1987 board game based on medieval Europe

Blood Royale is a board game based on medieval Europe, published by Games Workshop in 1987 and designed by Derek Carver (who also designed another Games Workshop board game, Warrior Knights). The lead artist was Christos Achilleos. The game is currently out of print.

== Game components ==
The regular board game version included a six-piece board with a map of the playable European kingdoms, 30 plastic playing pieces, ca. 250 counters to represent armies, ongoing events and trade goods, 96 plastic coins, and 63 event cards. It also came with different paper pads to track trade and contracts and pre-printed character sheets. 3 six-sided and 1 ten-sided dice were included with the base game. The optional 3-D Blood Royale pack included 67 metal miniatures that could be painted and used instead of the plastic playing pieces and army counters.

== Gameplay ==
Game play combined management of a medieval dynasty (with rules for character creation, and centred on the creation of treaties through arranged marriages) with territorial expansion and financial reward. At game start, each player picked one of England, Germany, Italy, Spain or France and the corresponding king, queen, and heir. In subsequent rounds, dice rolls were used to determine if the existing characters survive, and if new children were born. These children could in turn be married to characters from other realms to form alliances and negotiate financial benefits.

To gain access to regular income, players had to collect resources from the provinces on the map. A set of at least three out of five available resources (cloth, metal, food, wine, and gold) could be exchanged for money. To gain additional resources, players had to trade with each other or conquer provinces. The winner was the player who ultimately made the most money; the other games mechanisms provided means and obstacles to this end.

As with the Games Workshop edition of Warrior Knights, the components were of a high quality and the mechanisms were innovative for their day; the designer was a well known name; the dynastic rules in particular provided a high degree of involvement for players. Criticisms of the game have centred on the length of time it may take to play, although designer Derek Carver saw the emergence of long campaigns over multiple sessions as a positive feature.

== Publication history ==
Derek Carver came up with the idea for Blood Royale as being built around a scenario with the potential to be the subject of a good game.

However the game was published near the end of the time when Games Workshop was interested in publishing board games outside what would become its core milieu of Warhammer and Warhammer 40,000, and it was quickly withdrawn.

In 2005 Fantasy Flight Games acquired its rights with others old Games Workshop titles like Warrior Knights, Talisman, Fury of Dracula, but after more than two years planning for a new edition of Blood Royale was suspended for unknown reasons.

== Reception ==
Paul Cockburn reviewed Blood Royale for White Dwarf #91, and stated that "In Blood Royale many things are possible. It is an epic game, partly because it is such a big game. it is also a game where the players have choices to make and they can turn the fate of the game on one inspired decision."

Richard A. Edwards and David Nalle reviewed Blood Royale in Space Gamer/Fantasy Gamer No. 82. Edwards commented that "Those gamers who are looking for a medieval wargame should pass wide of this one. Those who are looking for a short multi-player game should also pass this by. But those gamers who are looking for a good diplomatic game with a medieval setting that combines the aspects mentioned above will not be disappointed with Blood Royale, even at its high price." Nalle commented that "On the whole, Blood Royale is an impressive game. It avoids the unnecessary complications which drag down Warrior Knights. It recreates some aspects of the High Middle Ages with impressive ease and simplicity. Blood Royale is a fun game, with elements of role-playing and boardgaming strategy. It is the kind of game which will please a broad audience of recreational gamers, especially those who enjoy games like Diplomacy and Kingmaker."

== Reviews ==
- Casus Belli #40 (Oct 1987)
- Spotlight on Games (1987)
