= In Search of New Gods =

- Character levels: 4-7
- Authors: Paul Cockburn with Graeme Davis and Bryan James
- First published: 1986

In Search of New Gods is an adventure for fantasy role-playing games published by Games Workshop in 1986.

== Plot summary ==
In Search of New Gods is an adventure scenario intended for player characters of levels 4-7, in which they must find out a priest went as a missionary to a foreign land, only to return home to convert his own people to the gods of the foreigners. The book includes another short scenario, and both adventures can be used for AD&D.

== Publication history ==
In Search of New Gods was written by Paul Cockburn with Graeme Davis and Bryan James, with a cover by Peter Jones, and was published by Games Workshop in 1986 as a 60-page book.
