= Space Fleet =

1991 board game

- Manufacturers: Games Workshop
- Publishers: Games Workshop
- Years active: 1991
- Players: 2+
- Setup time: 10 minutes
- Chance: Dice rolling
- Age range: 8+

Space Fleet is a board game for 2–4 players, published in 1991 by Games Workshop and designed by Jervis Johnson and Andy Jones.

The game is set in the Games Workshop fictional Warhammer 40,000 universe and is centred on combat between spacecraft. It can be seen as a fore-runner to Battlefleet Gothic.

== Gameplay ==
Each player takes a combat display, which shows the ship's 4 fire arcs. Each individual fire arc is a 90 degree arc of a circle covering the front, sides and rear of the ship. 12 shield tokens are then distributed amongst the fire arcs by the player. 4 Damage tokens are placed on the centre of the combat display, and the players' ships are set up at opposite ends of the board.

Players choose a movement option secretly on their helm computer chart. The movement options vary from moving 0–2 squares and changing a ship's facing. Ships are then moved simultaneously, with any ships that end up in the same square being considered to have rammed each other. Ramming damage is assigned by each player dropping 4 six-sided dice into the box lid, which is divided into a 3×3 grid. Any dice that land in the middle grid count as one point of damage to the appropriate arc of the ship.

After movement, weapons are fired. Players choose a target, then roll the appropriate number of dice in the box lid depending on the location of the target in the shooting ship's fire arc. The ship's keel gun can only fire in the 90 degree arc to the front and inflicts most potential damage at a range of 3 squares, while the ship's broadside guns inflict most potential damage at a range of 1 square and can only fire to either side of the ship. Any dice that occupies a hit grid section in the box inflicts one point of damage. Any individual die in a hit section which rolls a six is deemed to have caused a critical hit, with additional damage to the target determined randomly on the Critical Damage chart.

Any damage inflicted causes the removal of shield tokens from the target ship's appropriate fire arc. Once all shields have been removed, further damage to that arc causes the removal of Damage tokens. Once all 4 damage tokens have been removed, a ship is destroyed.

Like movement, firing is resolved simultaneously, resulting in the possibility that ships could destroy each other on the same turn.

Play then resumes with a new movement phase.

The winner is the player who destroys his opponents first.

== Expanded rules ==
White Dwarf magazine published expanded rules, across WD issues 139, 140, 141, 146, making it far more advanced by differentiating between the Eldar and Imperial ships included in the original box and adding rules for additional races such as the Tyranids.

Ships now had fixed shields on each fire arc and a different number of damage points. They also had different special rules, Critical Damage tables, speed and an associated points cost. Each ship also had its effective weapons range increased to 9 squares.

The Imperial ships were classed as Gothic Battleships and no longer had any shields to the rear due to their engines. They had more damage points than the Eldar ships and did more damage at close range. The keel gun was changed to a vortex torpedo with a fixed forward fire arc (a more limited version of the original forward fire arc) and they retained their broadside weaponry.

The Eldar ships were classed as Eldar Wraithships. They had shields on all fire arcs, but had stronger shields on the front arc. They did slightly more damage at range than the Gothic Battleship, their speed was increased to 3 squares and were classed as 'super manoeuvrable', allowing them extra movement options on an expanded helm computer. They were also constrained by the solar wind, the direction of which was determined at the start of the game. The ship's facing in relation to the solar wind at the start of the movement phase determined its maximum movement for the turn.

The Wraithship's keel gun was changed to a Plasma torpedo, also with a fixed forward fire arc like the Vortex torpedo, but their broadside attacks were changed to a forward arc only.

The rules for additional ships were also added such as the Eldar Shadowhunter, which removed attack dice equal to or lower than its current speed and the Dominator Battleship with an Inferno Cannon weapon that had an area effect.

== Reviews ==
- Challenge #59 (1992)
