= Spacefarers =

Science fiction tabletop wargame

Rules for Science Fiction Skirmish Adventures
- Cover by Tony Yates
- Designers: Nick Henfrey; Andy Murdin
- Illustrators: Jim Pitts; Tony Yates
- Publishers: Games Workshop
- Publication: 1981; 44 years ago
- Genres: Science fiction Miniatures skirmish wargame

Spacefarers is a 1981 board game published by Games Workshop.

== Gameplay ==
Spacefarers is a set of miniature rules designed specifically to be used with the Spacefarers figures from Citadel Miniatures.

== Reception ==
William A. Barton reviewed Spacefarers in The Space Gamer No. 46. Barton commented that "If you enjoy SF miniature skirmishes - and especially if you own Spacefarers figures - Spacefarers should prove of interest to you."
