= Damnatus =

Damnatus: The Enemy Within (German: Damnatus: Der Feind Im Innern) was a non-commercial low-budget movie made in Germany "by fans for fans" that takes place in the Warhammer 40,000 universe.

The most enduring problem with Damnatus' release was a conflict of copyright laws in England and Germany. German copyright law considers a copyright to be unalienable (except through inheritance – though a perpetual exclusive grant of rights is possible), and thus Games Workshop, the rights holder, claimed to lose the rights to the intellectual property of Warhammer 40,000 on which Damnatus is based. Games Workshop has thus far refused to allow it to be shown, and has not changed this position despite online petitions and requests from the filmmakers. As a result, production on Damnatus was ended indefinitely on October 15, 2007. However, it was leaked through various torrent sites and is available on YouTube.
