= Aeronautica Imperialis =

Science fiction aerial combat miniatures wargame

Aeronautica Imperialis is a miniature wargame set within the Warhammer 40,000 universe. The games depict aerial warfare between different factions in the setting, either as one-off battles or as part of a larger narrative campaign. The first edition was released in January 2007 by Forge World, a division of the British gaming company Games Workshop. The second edition, a relaunch via Games Workshop, was released in August 2019 with a different ruleset and new, larger models.

The game was later re-released alongside Adeptus Titanicus and Legions Imperialis in December 2023 focused exclusively on The Horus Heresy era.

== 2007 edition ==
Aeronautica Imperialis
- Cover of the original Aeronautica Imperialis rulebook
- Designers: Forge World and others
- Publishers: Games Workshop
- Publication: 2007
- Players: 2+
- Setup time: 5 – 30 minutes
- Playing time: 30 minutes – 3 hours
- Chance: Dice rolling
- Website: forgeworld.co.uk

Aeronautica Imperialis was released as a specialist game by Forge World, with all aircraft designed and produced by them in resin.

=== Gameplay ===
The game was played on a free-form basis similar to the Star Wars: X-Wing Miniatures Game, with models not constrained to cells. Aircraft could change speed and altitude, and perform a variety of manoeuvres. The Aeronautica Imperialis rulebook contains not only rules for the games, but also two sheets of cards which are used to make special manoeuvres. Other content in the rulebook is background material on the individual aircraft, along with full colour plates and suggestions for painting. At the end of the book, there is a "campaign" section with scenarios for players to recreate.

=== Scale ===
The models were produced at 6mm scale, matching the existing Epic miniature scale.

=== Factions ===
- Imperial Navy
- Tau
- Eldar (now Aeldari)
- Forces of Chaos
- Orks

=== Supplements ===
- Tactica Aeronautica (2007): Introduced new factions and aircraft, new rules, a new campaign (set on Typha-IV) and extra scenarios.

The Forge World book Imperial Armour: Aeronautica is not related to the Aeronautica Imperialis game; instead it contains rules to enable use of Forge World aircraft in Warhammer 40,000.

=== Companion novels ===
Aeronautica Imperialis has a strong tie with the Black Library book Double Eagle by Dan Abnett. This deals with the air war occurring during the Sabbat Worlds campaign (the setting for Abnett's Gaunt's Ghosts novel series). It has a Battle of Britain flavour; many of the concepts elucidated in the Aeronautica Imperialis rules can be seen in Abnett's writing.

== 2019 edition ==
Aeronautica Imperialis
- Designers: Games Workshop, Warwick Kinrade
- Publishers: Games Workshop
- Publication: 2019
- Years active: 2019-present
- Players: 2
- Setup time: 5 minutes
- Playing time: 45-90 minutes
- Chance: Dice rolling
- Website: aeronautica-imperialis.com

Aeronautica Imperialis was redesigned and released under the Games Workshop brand in August 2019. Starter sets include two small squadrons of opposing forces (initially Imperium vs Orks, a later set added Imperium vs T'au), a basic rulebook, a game mat and various tokens. Additional aircraft are available, with the majority released in plastic under the Games Workshop brand and a small number of specialist aircraft available in resin from Forge World. Supplements are themed around a fictional in-universe campaign, with rules to add more aircraft to the game and a set of missions to enable recreation of key battles of the conflict.

=== Gameplay ===
The game is played on a mat with hex-shaped cells, removing the need for tape measures. Players alternate moving models and shooting, as opposed to taking complete turns; this simulates the simultaneous nature of a dogfight. Tactical decisions include selecting aircraft speed and altitude, hidden selection of aircraft manoeuvres to keep the opponent guessing, the advantageous 'tailing' position (where an aircraft gains an extra round of shooting if it is in another's rear arc) and avoidance (or intentional use) of spins and stalls.

=== Scale ===
The refreshed model line-up is scaled to 8mm 'Heroic', matching the scale of the prior Adeptus Titanicus game. The models are approximately 1/4 the size of their Warhammer 40,000 equivalents.

=== Factions ===
- The Imperium of Man, subdivided into:
  - Aeronautica Imperialis, the atmospheric combat wing of the Imperial Navy, and the faction from which the name of the game is derived. This force is composed primarily of air superiority fighters, strike aircraft and bombers. They focus on controlling the airspace and performing bombing runs against ground targets.
  - Astra Militarum. Aircraft operated by the ground forces of the Imperium, in a role similar to the use of helicopters and close air support in modern militaries. They excel at tight manoeuvres and deploying troops on the ground.
  - Adeptus Astartes (Space Marines), flying boxy but tough aircraft designed to offer close support to ground operations.
  - Adeptus Custodes, the elite personal bodyguards of the Emperor, flying the rarest, most powerful aircraft in the Imperium.
- Orks. A ramshackle fleet of aircraft, most useful in a tight-quarters brawl and with their signature comedic flair.
- T'au Empire, specifically the Air Caste. A young but technologically advanced race, with highly customisable aircraft and access to autonomous drones.
- Aeldari (Eldar):
  - Asuryani (Craftworld Eldar). Their aircraft are fast and highly manoeuvrable, but fragile.
- Necrons. Fast, agile and tough, but outnumbered.

=== Supplements ===
Supplements for Aeronautica Imperialis are released in the form of "Campaign Books", which incorporate new or updated rules, extra aircraft and narrative missions to allow themed campaign play. They are usually released to coincide with a starter set (containing two small factions, a game mat and tokens), though additional aircraft are sometimes released with rules included in their box.

- Rynn's World Air War (2019): When Waaagh! Snagrod descended upon Rynn's World, it heralded a conflict so devastating that it led to the near destruction of the Crimson Fists Chapter. The Rynn's World Air War Campaign book enables you to refight the brutal aerial battles fought over the course of the war between the Imperial Navy and the Ork Flyboyz.
- Taros Air War (2020): Taros was an unassuming mining world nestled in the Ultima Segmentum, faithfully toiling in the service of the Imperium of Man for thousands of years... or so it seemed. The T’au Empire quietly began trading with the planetary governor – when this treachery was discovered, the Imperium's response was relentless and brutal.
- The Horus Heresy (2022): For two hundred years, the Imperium of Mankind has laid siege to the galaxy, its all-conquering armies spreading outwards from Terra to unite all humanity under the Emperor's banner. Now, as the galaxy burns in a brutal civil war, the Horus Heresy takes to the skies in the ultimate test of aerial supremacy.
