= The Siege of Minas Tirith =

1975 board wargame

- Designers: Richard Jordison
- Publishers: Fact and Fantasy Games
- Publication: 1975; 51 years ago
- Genres: Board wargame
- Languages: English
- Players: 2
- Playing time: 120 minutes
- Age range: 12+

The Siege of Minas Tirith is a 1975 board wargame designed by Richard Jordison and published by Fact and Fantasy Games. It depicts both the Battle of Pelennor Fields and the siege of Minas Tirith from the novel The Return of the King by J.R.R. Tolkien.

== Gameplay ==
The Siege of Minas Tirith is played on a hex map with locations from The Lord of the Rings novels. One player plays as the attacking army of Mordor, and the other plays as the defending army of Gondor. To win, the attacking player must cross Anduin and wipe out the army of Gondor; the defending player must delay the army of Mordor long enough for the time track to run out and the Ring of Power to be destroyed.

The army of Gondor includes advanced troops on the river, defensive forces behind the Rammas Echor, and a garrison in Minas Tirith. No troops can be moved out of their sector until the army of Mordor has penetrated it. At different times on the time track the Riders of Rohan and Aragorn arrive to assist the Gondor player. The army of Mordor also gets reinforcements, including regular soldiers, two oliphaunt units, and the battering ram Grond.

The game includes an optional rule where the army in control of the Ring of Power gets a significant power advantage. The army of Gondor starts with the Ring and must try to maintain control over it to prevent it from falling under control of the army of Mordor.

== Publication history ==
According to Shannon Appelcline, in 1975 TSR "started distributing other publishers' games — a pretty common tactic at the time, as the hobbyist industry was pretty fractured. They advertised their first distributed items in The Strategic Review #3 (Autumn 1975): a set of three fantasy board games. To be precise, they were three fantasy board games based on the writings of J.R.R. Tolkien: Fact and Fantasy's The Battle of Helm's Deep (1974), Fact and Fantasy's The Siege of Minas Tirith (1975), and LORE's Battle of the Five Armies (1975)."

== Reception ==
Larry Pound reviewed Siege of Minas Tirith in The Space Gamer No. 3, commenting that "All in all, the Siege of Minas Tirith is a good game and is faithful to the trilogy. The rules allow replication of the events of the trilogy without forcing the outcome." He described the game as "a classic example of a powerful army attempting to overrun a hard-pressed defense before aid arrives."

== Reviews ==
- Panzerfaust and Campaign Number 72 Mar-Apr 1976
