= Warcry (Miniatures Game) =

Tabletop Skirmish Wargame

Warhammer Warcry
- Manufacturers: Games Workshop
- Publishers: Games Workshop
- Years active: 2019–present
- Genres: Miniature wargaming
- Players: 2 or more
- Setup time: Varies depending on size of game, usually 15 to 30 minutes.
- Playing time: Varies depending on size of game, usually from 45 minutes to an hour and a half
- Chance: Medium (dice rolling)
- Skills: Military tactics, miniature painting
- Website: www.warhammer.com/en-GB/warcry/explore

Warcry is a skirmish tabletop wargame produced by Games Workshop in 2019. A second edition of the wargame was released on July 10, 2022. Unlike Games Workshop's other larger wargames, Warcry focuses on smaller warbands rather than large armies, with alternating model activations and quick, satisfying gameplay.

== Game Setting ==
Warcry is set in the Mortal Realms of Age of Sigmar and follows roughly the same timeline and progression. In its first edition, the story was focused around the Warbands of the Eightpoints, ragtag groups of warriors, cultists and mercenaries. These warbands fought for the favour of the Lord of the Eightpoints, Archaon, or pursued their own dark ambitions. Throughout the releases of the edition, the story progressed through Varanthax's Maw, a vast infernal forge beneath the Skullpike Mountains in Warcry:Catacombs, and the varanite mines of Warcry:Red Harvest. Additional one-off scenarios were also set in the Cursed City of Ulfenkarn, the Realm's Edge of Hysh and Anvilgard shortly before its fall to Morathi, among others.

In its second edition, the story was set around the Gnarlwood of Ghur, the Realm of Beasts. Warbands from every Grand Alliance vied to be the first to reach the crash site of the Seraphon temple-ship Talaxis and loot it for its reality-bending artifacts. Subsequent boxes continued getting closer to the crash site and the Realmshaper Engines once attached to Talaxis. Later, as part of White Dwarf 504, the story progressed to the Ravaged Coast of Aqshy with narrative campaign rules.

== Gameplay ==
Warcry is a game focused on quick rounds, strategy and decision-making. A regular game will last between 45 minutes to an hour and is primarily between two players, although rules for three and four player games have been published. Players choose their warband through either predetermined bespoke teams with some customisation or using Warcry's wide listbuilding options to make a truly custom team from bespoke teams, Age of Sigmar and/or Underworlds miniatures.

In its second edition a game has four rounds and uses the "Initiative Phase", a minigame to generate resources and determine player initiative. Then players activate their fighters one at a time, alternating between players after each fighter picked, until all of them have activated. Then a new round begins until the game ends. While each of the 62 factions has its own profiles and abilities, these are relatively light and easy to remember, allowing for the game to be focused around careful placement, tactical play and activation sequencing.

== Reception ==
Warcry won the Best Miniatures Game Award at the 45th Origins Awards in 2020.

== Reviews ==
- Dicebreaker
- GamesRadar+
- GeekDad
- Bleeding Cool
- Polygon
