= Superpower (board game) =

Board game

Superpower, The Game of Global Exploitation was a board game published by Games Workshop in 1986. The game was written by E. Bruce Hollands and Daniel R. McGregor and drew heavily on the iconography of the late Cold War era.

== Gameplay ==
Players choose a coloured token and draw a number of cards representing world opinion, third world countries and invasions, and then progress through the game seeking to control third world countries and manage world opinion by propaganda.

Players work to destabilise countries by coup d'etat, military response, military fortification and invasion - each action of which costs world opinion, which is played out in 'diplomacy' utilising the iconography of the United Nations.

The game board was a stylised map of the world split into four regions with a path of came spaces running around them, small coloured tokens representing military forces were placed on countries coming under the player's control (similarly to the method used in Monopoly with houses and hotels)

Up to six players could play with games taking between 90 minutes and two hours on average.

== Reception ==
Robin Parry reviewed Superpower for Adventurer magazine and stated that "The best thing about Superpower is the ease of play (once the rules have been mastered), as it can be set up readily and completed in a couple of hours. The players have the option of prolonging the game if they wish, by not taking the final third world card or forcing one to be returned to stock. The worst thing is that it is anticlimatic in that the winner is decided by totalling the points awarded to each player for their countries, bonuses for regions, etc. There is no 'grand slam' effect or atmosphere of world domination. Tweezers could also be included for the benefit of the old wrinklies like me."

David Walle reviewed Super Power in Space Gamer/Fantasy Gamer No. 82. Walle commented that "Super Power is a cleverly produced and conceived game with a great basic idea, but while the mechanics are inventive and playable, the game falls short in the end because it is so shallow and relies so heavily on died rolls, leaving players feeling powerless and unfulfilled."

== Reviews ==
- Casus Belli #33 (June 1986)
