= Warrior Knights =

1985 board game for 2–6 players

Cover art of the German-language edition, 2006

Warrior Knights is a board game for 2–6 players originally published by Games Workshop in 1985, and later published by Fantasy Flight Games in 2006. Each player takes the role of a Baron vying to claim the throne of an unnamed kingdom. Gameplay revolves around raising an army, obtaining enough money to maintain that army, and gaining influence through a variety of means.

An expansion, Crown and Glory, was released by Fantasy Flight Games in 2007, adding scientific advancement and other optional rules to the game.

== Contents ==
In the 2006 version of the game, Warrior Knights is played on a square board approximately 24" to a side. The majority of the board is used to represent the Kingdom, overlaid with a hexagonal grid. Additional insets are used for overseas cities, all of which are real places, notably including Jerusalem and Constantinople. Additional areas on the board are used to keep track of stacks of cards or counters.

The game components include:

- 380 die-cut cardboard counters representing crowns (money), faith, votes, influence, casualties, breaches, expeditions, sieges, and control.
- a set of Action cards for each player, used to select what activities that player will perform each round, plus extra Neutral Action cards
- 36 Event cards
- 45 Agenda cards
- 66 mercenary cards
- 24 Fate cards, used to resolve any random outcome within the game.
- a cardboard gavel, wielded by the player controlling the office of Chairman of the Assembly
- a cardboard sceptre, give to the player who becomes Head of the Church
- 24 plastic counters used to mark cities
- 24 plastic figurines representing Nobles (four per player), who lead the players' armies
- a rulebook

== Gameplay ==
The King of an unnamed kingdom has been murdered. Now the Barons of the realm (2–6 players) must vie for control of the empty throne.

Each round of gameplay consists of at least three phases: Planning, Action, and Upkeep. In addition, the following special phases may be triggered during the Action phase, and may or may not happen in any given round: Taxation, Wages, Assembly, and the Mercenary Draft.

=== Planning ===
Each player selects up to six action cards from his action deck. These are divided into which two the player wishes to execute first, which two second, and which two last. All players' "first" choices are shuffled together, all "second" choices shuffled together, and all "last" choices shuffled together. Two cards from the Neutral Action deck are shuffled into each stack.

=== Action ===
Cards from the "first" action stack are revealed and resolved one at a time. A player's action card may allow the player to collect crowns, votes, or faith, Move or attack with an army, or claim a turn in the mercenary draft. Neutral actions typically affect all players and may result in an Event card being drawn or provide opportunities to replace casualties, repair or improve city defenses, or invest in an overseas expedition.

After each card is executed, it is allocated to one of the card stacks on the lower right-hand corner of the board. When one of these stacks contains enough cards, one of the special phases is triggered.

=== Upkeep ===
During the Upkeep phase, any player who has control of more than half the cities in the Kingdom wins. If no player controls that many cities, each player receives one Influence counter for each city they control. These counters are taken from a pile set aside at the beginning of the game. When this pile is exhausted, the game ends and the player with the most influence is the winner.

=== Taxation ===
When a Taxation phase is triggered, all players gain a number Crowns determined by which cities they control.

=== Wages ===
When a Wages phase is triggered, all players must pay the troops they control. Unpaid mercenaries desert the player's army and are shuffled back into the mercenary deck.

=== Assembly ===
Three Agenda cards are drawn. These may adjust the rules of the game or give one player additional options. Players spend their Vote tokens to determine whether or not an agenda enters play, or to determine which player receives the card.

=== Mercenary Draft ===
The only way a player can increase the size of his army is by hiring mercenaries. A number of cards equal to one more than the number of players is drawn from the Mercenary deck. Players claim turns in the Mercenary Draft during the Action phase. When all the turns are claimed, the Mercenary draft occurs. Players who have claimed a turn have the option of hiring one of the available mercenary cards by paying the fee listed on the card.

== Victory conditions ==
In the edition published by Games Workshop in 1987, the first player to conquer more than half of the undamaged cities in play wins the game.

The 2006 edition of the game published by Fantasy Flight Games added an additional victory condition: If the pool of Influence counters is exhausted before one player has conquered more than half of the cities, the player with the most Influence at that point is declared the winner.

== Reception ==
Alex Bardy reviewed Warrior Knights for Adventurer magazine and stated that "An epic game, of Epic proportions, taking an Epic amount of time to play! Thankfully, it hasn't an Epic price."

In the August–September 1987 edition of Space Gamer/Fantasy Gamer (No. 79), although Tom Swider found issues with some of the rules and cards in the original version by Games Workshop, he liked the game, saying, "The system is simple enough to attract players, and provides enough action to keep ones interest high, even if the fates have not been kind. I highly recommend the purchase of this game to gamers who like multi-player games such as Kingmaker or Borderlands." Swider commented that

On the German game review site Good Game Guide, the reviewers were impressed by the components of the 2006 edition of the game, but found the thick rulebook to be daunting, saying that an initial read-through of the rules "can easily take around 90 minutes." They also advised that the game could take significantly longer than the 90 minutes advertised on the box, commenting, "You can easily expect one hour per player." However, the reviewers thought this was time well spent, calling the game "complex and highly interesting." The only element of the game that drew criticism was the combat system, which the reviewers found "unnecessarily complicated." The reviewers concluded with a strong recommendation, saying, "You should definitely try the game, but bring some time and patience, because in fact the game has many great elements."

On the German game review site Fantasyguide, Marcus Krug admired the quality of the game components included with the Fantasy Flights edition, calling them "the most beautiful I have seen in a while." He also liked the design of the rulebook, but thought that it "could be a bit more structured [...] Looking up [rules] is not easy." He also found the game to be highly complex, saying, "The rules are not easy for beginners and in my experience are very daunting. This results in part from their complexity, but above all from the mass of possibilities that Warrior Knights offers." He warned that it takes several games to learn the proper strategies. Krug also noted that the game length of 45 minutes on the box was "optimistic", noting that "three or four of us needed about 3 to 4 hours, with 5 and 6 players it was more like 5 hours." He concluded that for the proper player, this was a great game: "If you are looking for a game of conquest, with beautiful battles and a good dose of politics, this is the place for you [...] Warrior Knights is certainly not an easy game, but it doesn't want to be and shouldn't be. This is about something epic that also needs to be experienced and not just played. In my opinion, absolutely recommendable, but only for people with the endurance for a long game."

On the Austrian game review site Spieletest, Bernard Tischler warned that "The complexity of Warrior Knights is appallingly high. [...] The game is therefore not for casual gamers, but requires at least three games with a committed, constant community of players, so that all the detailed rules can be internalized." Tischler felt that a basic game should have been published first, followed by the release of extra expansions containing new variant rules; he felt this would have opened the game up to casual gamers.

== Reviews ==
- Casus Belli #31 (Feb 1986)
- Games #77
- 1986 Games 100
- Isaac Asimov's Science Fiction Magazine v10 n7 (1986 07)
- Rebel Times #4
  - Rebel Times #13 (Crown and Glory expansion)
