= Battle of the Five Armies (board game) =

Board wargame

First edition cover of the game, 1975

Battle of the Five Armies is a board wargame published by LORE / JMJ Enterprises in 1975 — and later by TSR — that simulates the fictional Battle of Five Armies that was the finale of J.R.R. Tolkien's novel The Hobbit.

== Gameplay ==
Battle of the Five Armies is a wargame for two players, where one player controls the forces of good (the elves, humans and dwarves), while the second player controls the evil forces (goblins and wargs). The Good armies array themselves on the ridges overlooking the valley leading to the Lonely Mountain, while the Evil armies advance in the valley between the ridges. The Good player also controls eagles and Beorn when they enter the game late in the battle.

TSR's second edition box cover with art by Kathy Horn

== Publication history ==
With an increase in the popularity of J.R.R. Tolkien's works in the mid-1970s, spurred on by the appearance of fantasy role-playing games such as Dungeons & Dragons, some small game companies published unlicensed wargames simulating the various battles in Tolkien's works. These included Fact and Fantasy's The Battle of Helm's Deep (1974) and The Siege of Minas Tirith (1975), and LORE's Battle of the Five Armies, designed by Larry Smith and released in a manila envelope. As RPG historian Shannon Appelcline noted in his 2014 book Designers & Dragons, TSR immediately bought the rights to these games and republished them as both a ziplock bag game and as a boxed set in 1975. These were advertised in The Strategic Review #3 (Autumn 1975).

The inaugural issue of TSR's Dragon (June 1976) included an article by the designer of Battle of Five Armies, Larry Smith, describing how to convert his board wargame into a miniatures wargame using the rules from Chainmail.

In 1977, the Tolkien Estate issued cease & desist orders to all publishers of unlicensed games, forcing TSR to withdraw all three games from the market.

=== 2005 Version ===
In 2005, Games Workshop released Battle of Five Armies, unrelated to the original Larry Smith game, this one designed by Rick Priestley based on Games Workshop's Warmaster rules, which uses highly detailed 10 mm figures sculpted by Mark Harrison.

=== 2014 Edition ===
In 2014, Ares Games produced The Battle of Five Armies, again unrelated to the original Larry Smith game. This one is a standalone game based on the rules for the War of the Ring board game, but with rule revisions to allow tactical play.

== Reception ==
In his 1977 book The Comprehensive Guide to Board Wargaming, although Nicky Palmer found the game "Simple to learn and play", he was disappointed with it, noting, that the "production and rules [are] below usual wargame standards, with few strategic alternatives." Palmer disliked "the option for one side to retreat inside a mountain dominating the battlefield, and engage in a lengthy dice-rolling contest as the enemy tries to force his way inside." Palmer concluded, "Not recommended except to keen Tolkien fans, and even they are advised to modify the rules."

In The Space Gamer No. 3, Larry Pound commented that "All in all, the game [is] fair, but the total impression is not enhanced by the colors used for the unit counters or the way the terrain features are drawn."

In Issue 3 of White Dwarf, Martin Easterbrook stated that "The game's main strength is that it does possess something of the atmosphere of the book. The inexorably slow advancing sea of goblin warriors becomes quite hypnotic after a while and you really do begin biting your fingernails whilst praying for the arrival of the eagles and Beorn." Easterbrook concluded by giving the game an overall rating of only 5 out of 10.

== Other reviews and commentary ==
- Panzerfaust #69
- Panzerfaust and Campaign #72 and #75
- Campaign #81
