= Man O' War (game) =

Board game

Raging Sea Battles in the World of Warhammer
- Man O' War box art
- Manufacturers: Games Workshop
- Designers: Nigel Stillman, Bill King, Andy Jones,
- Publishers: Games Workshop
- Years active: 1993
- Players: 2+
- Chance: Dice rolling

Man O' War (sometimes also written as "Manowar") is a now out-of-print table top war game by Games Workshop. The game was set in the same realm of Warhammer Fantasy as used for the Warhammer Fantasy Battle and included most of the factions from that setting. Other races of the Warhammer world were not included, either because they were lacking seafaring abilities (Wood Elves), missing from the main factions at that time (Ogres, Lizardmen), or both.

The game name coming from "Man-of-war", it dealt with the sea battles of the Warhammer world; each player controlling a fleet of model ships. The game typically used a small number of models with half a dozen to a dozen models per player. Each model had a corresponding template to record damage, crew levels, and outbreaks of fire, among other bookkeeping activities. Some innovations were present, such as alternate unit activation.

== Forces ==
Ships were designated as belonging to one of 3 categories. The largest and most powerful ships were the Men O' War (MOW). These command ships operated singularly and usually carried the fleet Admiral and Wizard (if available). Men O' War were the most powerful ships in the game and they could typically take heavy punishment before sinking. Ships of the Line (SOL) varied in size and firepower and were operated in squadrons of 3. One ship in the squadron was designated as a flagship and the other ships in the squadron had to stay within 6" of it to receive orders or else they would become stragglers and suffer various penalties. Independents (INDs) were similar to Men O' War in that they operated singly, but were much less powerful and tended to be unique in some way, making their classification as a SOL less appropriate.

By the time all the supplements had been published Man O' War supported the following fleets:

- The Empire
- Bretonnia
- Dwarfs
- High Elves
- Dark Elves
- Orcs
- Chaos Plaguefleets (Slaanesh, Khorne, Nurgle, and Tzeentch)
- Chaos Dwarfs
- Skaven
- Norse
- Pirate fleets of Sartosa

== Contents ==
The boxed game included twelve plastic models (rowed galleys), sufficient to learn the basics of play in scenarios between "pirates" and "the Empire", but the other ships in the Empire's fleet and those for the other races were metal models. These came in small boxes rather than blister packs. Each box had the metal parts for the model ship (or ships - smaller ships came three to a box) and printed sails and flags with plastic masts (as applicable). These miniatures are now considered out of print. The boxed game contained land features in the form of printed card shapes as well as the printed templates.

The game was removed from store shelves in 1995, but remained available through mail order in selected countries, like the US. It reached a final "out of print" status in 1998. It seems that the miniature moulds had worn out because of the high number of duplicates; the Bretonnian Corsairs were the first units to be unavailable.

== Supplements ==
Two boxed supplements were published by Games Workshop each with a different focus on what they added to the game system. They were designed along with the boxed game, but released later to give the impression of an expanded product line.

Plague Fleet was the first expansion and its scope was to expand the total number of available fleets in the game. It included the cards and rules necessary to field the fleets of the forces of Chaos - ships for followers of the 4 Chaos gods (Khorne, Slaanesh, Tzeentch and Nurgle), as well as rules and templates for Skaven and Chaos Dwarf ships.

Sea of Blood focus was more on expanding the overall game elements as it added only one more fleet (that being the Norse). New rules and cards for adding both "Sea Monsters" and "Flyers" were included in this expansion. Sea Monsters and Beasts were additional "ships" that could be added to any fleet regardless of which race they were playing. This was generally seen as a good addition by most players - especially considering that many fleets consisted of just three ship types and adding these creatures allowed for more flexibility when purchasing a fleet. Sea of Blood added the following "Sea Monsters" and "Beasts" to the game: Triton, Sea Elemental, Kraken, Sea Dragon, Megalodon, Promethean, Black Leviathan, Gargantuan and Behemoth.

Flyers added an aerial dimension to battles and 1 or 2 new creatures or machines were added to each of the existing races - again, expanding the choices for each admiral. Many considered the Flyer squadron rules to be unbalanced in many respects, and they have been the object of much discussion on gaming forums dedicated to Man O' War.

Rules for another two types of Empire ship, a Dwarf "Dreadnought" and shore forts were also included to round out the Sea of Blood expansion.

Following the release of these supplements a series of articles which provided additional rules for Man O'War were published in issues the Citadel Journal. Number 6 (of the 2nd series) provided rules for an Undead fleet though no miniatures were ever modelled by Citadel.

== Fleets ==
The Bretonnian fleet was modelled on ships of the 17th century while the Empire tended more towards the look of earlier time (the inverse of their land armies). The Empire had ships with both oars and sails with the exception of the "Great-Ship" which was sail only. The Empire also had ships that carried single large cannon or mortars. The Empire's flying units were Griffin riders.

Dwarf ships were steam powered ironclads, they also had submarines and balloons.

High Elf ships were fast manoeuvrable sail powered catamarans. By comparison Dark Elves mainly used great sea creatures as the basis for their "ships" - their largest ship, the "Black Ark" could house several monster-ships within for protection.

Orc ships tended towards the ramshackle and unorthodox, with large paddle driven hulks and inaccurate stone throwers as their sole armament.

Chaos Dwarf fleets consisted of various types of Battlebarge, each mounting a larger version of their tabletop artillery, the death rocket and Earthshaker.

Norse fleets were modelled on Viking longships and carried no weapons. To offset this, the Norse had a variety of specialist crew types such as Berserkers and Ulfwerener (werewolves) and excelled at performing boarding actions.

== See also ==
The game was utilised as inspiration for the Games Workshop licensed naval warfare game Man O' War: Corsair by Evil Twin Artworks for the PC.

- Dreadfleet
- All at Sea (ruleset)

== Reception ==
Chris McDonough reviewed Man O' War in White Wolf #35 (March/April, 1993), rating it a 5 out of 5 and stated that "Not many new games are as truly inspired and exciting as Game Workshop's Man O' War game. For all you GW fans out there, this one is a masterpiece."
