= Traveller Personal Data Files =

Science-fiction role-playing game supplement

- '
- Publishers: Games Workshop
- Publication: 1981; 44 years ago
- Genres: Science-fiction
- Systems: Classic Traveller

Traveller Personal Data Files is a 1981 role-playing game supplement published by Games Workshop for Traveller.

== Contents ==
Traveller Personal Data Files consists of a pad of 50 character sheets, each containing spaces for skills, psionics, equipment, and other notes.

== Reception ==
William A. Barton reviewed Traveller Personal Data Files in The Space Gamer No. 48. Barton commented that "Overall, if you can locate this import item, you should find it quite useful."
