= Horus Heresy (2010 board game) =

Type of Board Game by Fantasy Flight Games

- Other names: Warhammer 40,000: Horus Heresy
- Designers: John Goodenough, Jeff Tidball
- Illustrators: Tim Arney-O'Neil, Daarken
- Publishers: Fantasy Flight Games
- Publication: 2010
- Genres: Board game
- Players: 2
- Playing time: 135 minutes
- Age range: 14 and up
- Website: thehorusheresy.com

Horus Heresy is a board game released in 2010 by games publisher Fantasy Flight Games for 2 players. The game is set in the far future of 30,000 AD, ten thousand years before the fictional continuity of Warhammer 40,000, where humanity is divided between Loyalist and Traitor forces during the Horus Heresy.
