= The Statue of the Sorcerer & The Vanishing Conjurer =

Tabletop fantasy role-playing game supplement

- Covers by Lee Gibbons.
- Designers: Mike Lewis; Simon Price; Chris Elliot; Richard Edwards
- Publishers: Games Workshop
- Publication: 1986; 40 years ago
- Genres: Horror
- Systems: Basic Role-Playing
- ISBN: 0-933635-30-3

The Statue of the Sorcerer & The Vanishing Conjurer is a pack of two adventures published under license by Games Workshop in 1986 for Chaosium's horror role-playing game Call of Cthulhu.

== Plot summary ==
The Statue of the Sorcerer & The Vanishing Conjurer contains two Call of Cthulhu adventures, printed in one book back-to-back and upside-down from each other. Rather than having a front cover and a back cover, the book has two front covers, one for each adventure.

1. The Statue of the Sorcerer is set in San Francisco in 1925, where the Investigators are approached by author Dashiell Hammett to investigate a con man defrauding older women of their life savings.
2. The Vanishing Conjurer is set in London, England in the 1920s, where the Investigators are asked to find a young stage magician who has disappeared. The Investigators must first infiltrate a mysterious guild of magicians by performing an audition to prove they are stage magicians. In an index, several simple tricks are described, and there is the option for players to present one or more of these to the Keeper as part of the audition.

== Publication history ==
The Vanishing Conjurer, 24 pages in length, was written by Mike Lewis and Simon Price, with interior illustrations by Ian Cook.

The Statue of the Sorcerer, a 36-page adventure, was written by Chris Elliot and Richard Edwards, with interior art by Tony Ackland.

David Oliver and Ian Varley provided the cartography for both adventures, and Lee Gibbons created the cover art. The two adventures, bound in a back-to-back softcover format with 16 pages of player hand-outs between them, was published under license by Games Workshop in 1985 as a 76-page softcover book.

== Reception ==
In the October 1986 edition of White Dwarf (Issue #82), Richard Meadows thought the plot of The Vanishing Conjurer to be "tight and a little linear, but on the whole this is an ideal adventure to introduce players to the game." Meadows was more enthusiastic about The Statue of the Sorcerer, saying that its inclusion "really makes this package worthwhile." He thought that "Everything is handled with a subtlety I've not seen in a [Call of Cthulhu] adventure for some time, and in a way that rewards intelligent deduction and penalises the usual blundering idiocies of poorer players." He concluded, "I heartily enjoyed this adventure and, more importantly, so did my players, though they were challenged to the limit of their abilities in some sections."

In the Spring 1987 edition of Abyss, Dave Nalle called The Statue of the Sorcerer "basically a good adventure, but experienced gamemasters might want to add some variations and sub or super plots." Nalle pointed out that The Vanishing Conjuror was shorter, "but because it is organized more loosely there is more potential for extended play and involvement." Nalle added, "The adventure is not particularly complex and is well suited to new players and action type characters rather than experienced players who may find it rather brief and trivial." Nalle concluded, "Neither of these adventures is perfect and both of them follow pretty safe formulae, but they have a nice sprinkling of original ideas and are easy to run and enjoyable to play."

In Issue 3 of The Unspeakable Oath, Les Dean and John Tynes noted "Though the Statue half of this Games Workshop must be set in 1925, Conjurer can easily be set in London during the 1890s ... The scenario's unspecific time setting is appreciated, and wouldn't be a bad thing to see more of."

== Other references ==
- Stardate Vol.3 Issue 2 (March 1987, p. 104)
