= Games Workshop =

British maker of miniature wargames

Games Workshop Group PLC

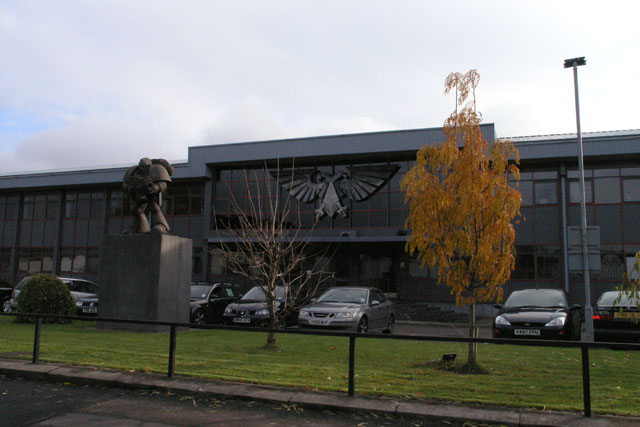
- Games Workshop headquarters in Nottingham
- Formerly: Games Workshop Limited (1975-1991); Games Workshop Group Limited (1991-1994)
- Type: Public limited company
- Traded as: LSE: GAW; FTSE 100 component
- Industry: Miniature wargaming
- Founded: 1975; 51 years ago in London, England (as Games Workshop); 9 December 1991; 34 years ago (as Games Workshop Group)
- Founders: John Peake; Ian Livingstone; Steve Jackson
- Headquarters: Nottingham, England
- Key people: Mark Lam (Chairman); Kevin Rountree (CEO)
- Products: Warhammer Age of Sigmar; Warhammer Fantasy; Warhammer 40,000; Middle-earth SBG; Warhammer 40,000 Kill Team
- Revenue: ▲£626.8 million (2026)
- Operating income: ▲£275.0 million (2026)
- Net income: ▲£206.0 million (2026)
- Subsidiaries: Citadel Miniatures; Black Library
- Website: www.warhammer.com

Games Workshop Group PLC (often abbreviated as GW) is a British manufacturer of miniature wargames based in Nottingham, England. Its best-known products are Warhammer and Warhammer 40,000.

Founded in 1975 by John Peake, Ian Livingstone and Steve Jackson, Games Workshop was originally a manufacturer of wooden boards for games including backgammon, mancala, nine men's morris and Go. It later became an importer of the U.S. role-playing game Dungeons & Dragons, and then a publisher of wargames and role-playing games in its own right, expanding from a bedroom mail-order company in the process. It expanded into Europe, the US, Canada, and Australia in the early 1990s. All UK-based operations were relocated to the current headquarters in Lenton, Nottingham in 1997.

It started promoting games associated with The Lord of the Rings film trilogy in 2001. It also owns Forge World, which makes complementary specialist resin miniatures and conversion kits. It is listed on the London Stock Exchange and has been a constituent of the FTSE 100 Index since 20 December 2024.

== History ==
=== Early years ===
Founded in 1975 at 15 Bolingbroke Road, London by John Peake, Ian Livingstone and Steve Jackson (not to be confused with U.S. game designer Steve Jackson), Games Workshop was originally a manufacturer of wooden boards for games including backgammon, mancala, nine men's morris, and Go. It later became an importer of the U.S. role-playing game Dungeons & Dragons, and then a publisher of wargames and role-playing games in its own right, expanding from a bedroom mail-order company in the process.

The cover of White Dwarf Issue #1, June/July 1977

In order to promote their business and postal games, create a games club, and provide an alternative source for games news, the newsletter Owl and Weasel was founded in February 1975. This was superseded in June 1977 by White Dwarf.

From the outset, there was a clear, stated interest in print regarding "progressive games", including computer gaming, which led to the departure of John Peake in early 1976, who preferred "traditional games", such as backgammon. The loss of Peake also meant the loss of the fledgling company's main source of income. However, having successfully obtained official distribution rights to Dungeons & Dragons and other TSR products in the UK, and maintaining a high profile by running games conventions, the business grew rapidly. It opened its first shop in April 1978.

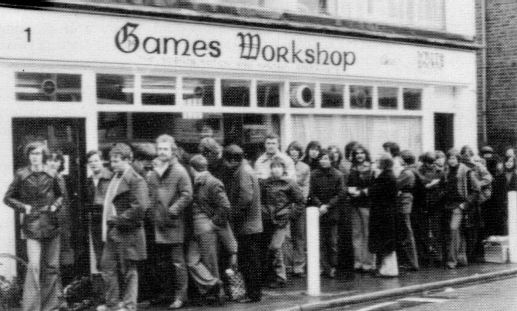
Games Workshop opening day at 1 Dalling Road, Hammersmith, London, in April 1978.

In late 1978, Games Workshop provided the funding to co-found Citadel Miniatures in Newark-on-Trent. Citadel would produce the metal miniatures used in its role-playing games and tabletop wargames. The "Citadel" name became synonymous with Games Workshop Miniatures, and continues to be a trademarked brand name used in association with them long after the Citadel company was absorbed into Games Workshop. For a time Gary Gygax promoted the idea of TSR, Inc. merging with Games Workshop, until Steve Jackson and Ian Livingstone backed out.

The company's publishing arm also released UK reprints of American RPGs such as Call of Cthulhu, RuneQuest, Traveller and Middle-earth Role Playing, which were expensive to import, having previously done so for Dungeons & Dragons since 1977.

In 1984, Games Workshop ceased distributing its products in the U.S. through hobby games distributors and opened its Games Workshop (U.S.) office. Games Workshop (U.S.), and Games Workshop in general, grew significantly in the late 1980s, with over 250 employees on the payroll by 1990.

From 1985 to 1987, the focus of the company shifted from role-playing games and board games to miniature wargames, following the successful release of Warhammer Fantasy Battle in 1983 and Warhammer 40,000 in 1987, and the change of ownership and direction when Bryan Ansell became managing director and majority owner of the company.

=== Refocus ===
Tom Kirby became General Manager in 1986. Kirby became CEO following a management buyout, backed by private equity firm ECI Partners in December 1991, when majority owner Bryan Ansell, Keith Pinfold (CFO), Livingstone and Jackson, sold their shares for £10 million, Games Workshop refocused on their miniature wargames Warhammer Fantasy Battle (WFB) and Warhammer 40,000 (WH40k), their most lucrative lines. The retail chain refocused on a younger, more family-oriented market.

The change of direction was a great success and the company enjoyed growing profits, but the more commercial direction of the company made it lose some of its old fan base. A breakaway group of two company employees published Fantasy Warlord in competition with Games Workshop, but the new company met with little success and closed in 1993. Games Workshop expanded in Europe, the US, Canada and Australia, opening new branches and organising events in each new commercial territory. Having been acquired by private equity firm ECI Partners, the company was floated on the London Stock Exchange in October 1994. In October 1997 all UK-based operations were relocated to the current headquarters in Lenton, Nottingham.

The company diversified by acquiring Sabretooth Games (card games), creating the Black Library (literature), and working with THQ (computer games).

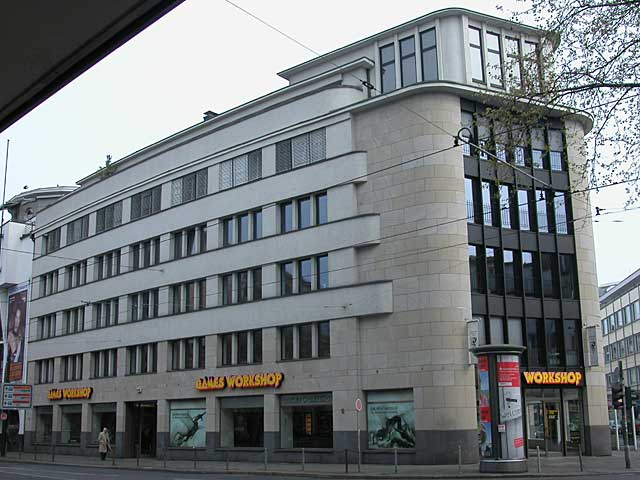
A Games Workshop store in Düsseldorf, Germany, 2009

In late 2009 Games Workshop issued a succession of cease and desist orders against various Internet sites it accused of violating its intellectual property, generating anger and disappointment from its fan community.

In May 2011, Maelstrom Games announced that Games Workshop had revised the terms and conditions of their trade agreement with independent stockists in the UK. The new terms and conditions restricted the sale of all Games Workshop products to within the European Economic Area. In June 2013, WarGameStore, a UK-based retailer of Games Workshop products since 2003, announced further changes to Games Workshop's trade agreement with UK-based independent stockists.

Tom Kirby stepped down in 2017.

In July 2021, Games Workshop made changes to their IP guidelines, adopting a "zero tolerance" stance towards fan-made games, videos and animations, drawing criticism from fans.

The presence of Games Workshop in the East Midlands has led the region to become the centre of the wargames industry in the UK, known as the lead belt, with numerous other companies founded by former employees in the area.

== Operations ==
=== Licensing ===
Alongside the UK publishing rights to several American role-playing games in the 1980s (including Call of Cthulhu, Runequest and Middle-earth Role Playing,) Games Workshop also secured the rights to produce miniatures or games for several classic British science fiction properties such as Doctor Who and several characters from 2000 AD including Rogue Trooper and Judge Dredd. Alongside the rights to reprint Iron Crown Enterprises' Middle-earth Role Playing, Citadel Miniatures acquired the rights to produce 28 mm miniatures based on The Lord of the Rings and The Hobbit.

In conjunction with the promotion of The Lord of the Rings film trilogy in 2001, Games Workshop acquired the rights to produce a skirmish wargame and miniatures, using the movies' production and publicity art, and information provided by the original novels by J.R.R. Tolkien. A 25 mm scale was used. The rights to produce a role-playing game using the films' art and both the book and the movies' plots and characters were sold to another firm, Decipher, Inc. Games Workshop also produced a Battle of Five Armies game based on a culminating episode in The Hobbit, using 10 mm scale.

In February 2011, Warner Bros. Consumer Products announced that it had extended its six-year agreement with Games Workshop, continuing its exclusive, worldwide rights to produce tabletop games based on "The Hobbit" and "The Lord of the Rings." Games Workshop announced plans to expand their offerings of battle-games and model soldiers, and to continue to develop and increase offerings based on J.R.R. Tolkien's fantasy books.

=== Group divisions ===
Games Workshop has expanded into several divisions/companies producing products related to the Warhammer universe.

- Forge World makes specialist resin miniatures and conversion kits for Games Workshop's titles as well as its Specialist Games range. Forge World was also responsible for the Warhammer Historical line of historical wargames rules, including Warhammer Ancient Battles, all of which were previously published by as a component of Black Library. In August 2018, Forge World announced substantial changes to its U.S. pricing model in exchange for faster and less costly shipping services to the United States. As of 31 October 2023, the Forge World website was made defunct as part of the company merger under the banner name "Warhammer" in one website, the resin kits sold were also marked as "Advance model kits" with an age rating attached
- BL Publishing was the fiction, board game and roleplaying game publishing arm of Games Workshop. They comprised several separate imprints; Black Library, Black Flame, Solaris Books and Warp Artefacts.

The company has hard-to-reproduce, unique intellectual property, and a good export record. Sales slowed around 1999-2000 due to supply chain issues, but quickly rebounded a few years later.

== Miniature games ==
Games Workshop previously produced miniature figures via an associated, originally independent, company called Citadel Miniatures while the main company concentrated on retail. The distinction between the two blurred after Games Workshop stores ceased to sell retail products by other manufacturers, and Citadel was effectively merged back into Games Workshop.

=== Current core games ===
The following games were in production as of June 2026:

- Warhammer Age of Sigmar (4th Edition, 2024)
- Warhammer The Old World (2024)
- Warhammer 40,000 (11th Edition, 2026)
- Warhammer: The Horus Heresy (3rd Edition, 2025)
- Middle-earth Strategy Battle Game (2nd Edition, 2024)

==== Other games ====
The following games were in production as of 2024:

- Adeptus Titanicus – A new version of the original game (released 2019).
- Aeronautica Imperialis – Aerial combat game, updated from the Forge World version (released 2019).
- Blood Bowl – an American football style game using fantasy creatures. Originally released in 1986, it was revived in 2016 with a "Second Season Edition" in 2020.
- Legions Imperialis – a war game set during the Horus Heresy, in the Warhammer 40,000 universe, Legions Imperialis is a revitalised version of Epic 40,000.
- Necromunda Underhive – a skirmish game set on a hive world which pits gangs of humans against each other (released 2017), updated from the 1995 version.
- Warcry – A skirmish game set in the Age of Sigmar universe (new edition released 2022).
- Warhammer 40,000: Kill Team – A skirmish version of Warhammer 40,000, using the same factions and units (new edition released 2024).
- Warhammer: Underworlds – A game set in the Age of Sigmar setting combining miniature gaming and deck-building (released 2017).

=== Out of print ===
==== Warhammer Age of Sigmar universe ====
- Warhammer Quest: Shadows over Hammerhal (released 2017)

==== Warhammer Fantasy universe ====
- Advanced Heroquest
- Kerrunch – a simplified version of Blood Bowl.
- Man O' War – a game of naval combat in a fantasy world. Two expansions were also released, Sea of Blood and Plague Fleet.

The cover of Mighty Warriors

- Mighty Warriors – a simplified version of HeroQuest, designed to be introductory games for younger players. More of a light Skirmish game using AHQ minis set in a dungeon with modular tiles to create the maps, pitting the hero characters against Skaven ratmen.
  - Dragon Masters – a board game which played like a simplified version of Mighty Empires, in which players take the role of competing Elven princes in Ulthuan.
- Warhammer Fantasy Battles – a game of mass fantasy battles.
  - Terror of the Lichemaster, a set of three linked scenarios using Warhammer Fantasy Battle setting and rules.
- Warhammer Quest – a game of dungeon exploration and questing, effectively an updated version of Advanced Heroquest.
- Warhammer Quest: Silver Tower (released 2016) – dungeon crawl game in the Warhammer Age of Sigmar universe. Despite sharing the Warhammer Quest brand, rules and settings are completely different from the original game.

==== Warhammer 40,000 universe ====
- Adeptus Titanicus (The original game in the Epic series, which dealt solely with combat between Titans.)
  - Codex Titanicus (Expanded rules for the above, adding rules for Ork and Eldar titans along with expanded rules for Eldar, Orks, Imperial Guard infantry and vehicles.)
- Advanced Space Crusade
- Assassinorum: Execution Force
- Bommerz over da Sulphur River (Board game using Epic miniatures.)
- Blackstone Fortress – a dungeon crawl game set in the Warhammer 40,000 universe.
- Epic 40,000 (The precursor to Epic Armageddon, although some people still use the terms interchangeably, alongside Epic.)
- Gorkamorka (A vehicle skirmish game set on a desert world, revolving principally around rival Ork factions.)
  - Digganob (An expansion for Gorkamorka, adding rebel gretchin and feral human factions.)
- Lost Patrol
- Shadow War: Armageddon – an updated version of the Necromunda skirmish ruleset, using the current Warhammer 40,000 factions in place of Necromunda's human gangs (released 2017).
- Space Fleet (A simple spaceship combat game, later greatly expanded via White Dwarf magazine with material intended for the aborted 'Battleship Gothic', itself later relaunched as Battlefleet Gothic.)
- Space Hulk (Four editions were published; expansions are listed below.)
  - Deathwing (An expansion boxed set adding new Terminator weapons and a new campaign.)
  - Genestealer (An expansion boxed set adding rules for Genestealer hybrids and psychic powers.)
  - Space Hulk Campaigns (An expansion book released in both soft- and hard-cover collecting reprinted four campaigns previously printed in White Dwarf.)
- Space Marine (The original Epic-scale game concerning troops and infantry, 1st edition was compatible with Adeptus Titanicus, 2nd with Titan Legions).
- Titan Legions (An update of Adeptus Titanicus, effectively an expansion of Space Marine 2nd edition.)
- Tyranid Attack (An introductory game reusing the boards from Advanced Space Crusade.)
- Ultra Marines (An introductory game reusing the boards from Space Hulk.) Reviewer Matt Sall praised Ultra Marines' unique game mechanic for determining the accuracy of weapons fire and close combat attacks: the game box featured a grid printed on the inside of the lid; dice were thrown into the lid, and results (HIT or MISS) were read from the squares in which the dice landed.

==== Specialist Games ====
- Warhammer Fantasy universe
  - Dreadfleet – a naval combat style board game (limited stock) released in October 2011.
  - Mighty Empires – a hexagonal tile based campaign supplement to WFB that was also playable as a game in its own right.
  - Mordheim – a skirmish game. An expansion called Empire in Flames was also released.
  - Warmaster – a game for fighting larger battles with smaller (10 mm) miniatures
- Warhammer 40,000 universe
  - Battlefleet Gothic – a game which depicts battles between fleets of space ships.
  - Epic – a game for fighting larger battles with smaller (6 mm) miniatures (known as Epic Armageddon in its current edition).
  - Inquisitor – a skirmish/role play game using larger (54 mm) more detailed miniatures and intended for older gamers.
  - Necromunda – a skirmish game set on a hive world which pits gangs of humans against each other, using modified 2nd edition Warhammer 40,000 rules, which are more detailed than newer editions and more suitable for skirmish games. Originally printed in 1995, it was revived at the end of 2017.
- The Lord of the Rings universe
  - The Battle of Five Armies – a game for fighting larger battles with smaller (10 mm) miniatures. The game was named after (and initially centred on) the Battle of Five Armies, one of the later scenes in J.R.R. Tolkien's The Hobbit.
  - The Strategy Battle Game was expanded with new supplements. In 2009 an expansion for the game entitled 'War of the Ring' was released, allowing players to recreate large scale battles in Middle-Earth. In December 2012 Games Workshop released the first wave of models based on the movie The Hobbit: An Unexpected Journey.

==== Forge World ====
- Aeronautica Imperialis – a game based around Epic scale aircraft combat

==== Licensed games ====
These games were not made by Games Workshop but used similar-style models, artwork and concepts. These games were made by mainstream toy companies and were available in toy and department stores.

- Battle Masters (published by Milton Bradley)
- HeroQuest (published by Milton Bradley)
  - Kellar's Keep (Expansion for HeroQuest)
  - Return of the Witch Lord (Expansion for HeroQuest)
  - Against the Ogre Horde (Expansion for HeroQuest)
  - Wizards of Morcar (Expansion for HeroQuest)
  - The Frozen Horror (Expansion for HeroQuest)
  - The Magic of the Mirror (Expansion for HeroQuest)
  - The Dark Company (Expansion for HeroQuest)
  - HeroQuest Adventure Design Kit (Expansion for HeroQuest)
  - Adventure Design Booklet (Expansion for HeroQuest)
- Space Crusade (published by Milton Bradley)
  - Mission Dreadnought (Expansion for Space Crusade)
  - Eldar Attack (Expansion for Space Crusade)

== Warhammer brand acrylic paints ==
Games Workshop produces a line of acrylic paints for painting miniatures, under the Warhammer Colour name, previously Citadel Colour. The first Citadel Colour paint sets were released in the 1980s. In 1998 Citadel paints were reworked in a new range of 75 colours in 12ml screwtop containers replacing the previous 18ml flip-top style at the same time changing manufacturer. At the end of March 2012 the company announced a new range of over 145 colours made in the UK. The current Warhammer Colour paint types are:

- Base: Pigment-dense for high opacity. Intended to offer good coverage over a primer layer for a strong foundation of colour.
- Layer: Thinner and less pigment dense than Base paints for slight translucency. Intended to be built up over multiple layers to create smooth transitions of colour or value.
- Shade: Acrylic ink based "paints" that are thin and flow easily into recessed details. Intended to be applied as a wash to add depth and shadow.
- Dry: Thick, paste-consistency paints with maximum pigment concentration. Intended to aid in dry-brushing to achieve easy highlighting of models.
- Air: A selection of colours from the Base and Layer lines that are thinned down, as well as some "Clear" paints. Intended to be used through an airbrush.
- Technical: A range of non-standard "paints" to achieve additional effects. These include gloss paints for slime or wet blood, semi-transparent glossy paints for gemstone effects, weathering effect paints, spectral effect paints, textured pastes for gaming bases, acrylic mediums, and acrylic varnishes. Intended for adding finishing details to models.
- Spray: Spray-can paints that come in black, white, and a small selection of colours from the Base line. Intended as a primer layer and to add a foundation coat of colour quickly.
- Contrast: Thinned paint and medium mixtures that flow into recesses similar to Shade paints, but also stain the raised details creating a blended fade from highlight to shadow. Intended to be applied over specialised Spray paints to give an effect similar to using a Base, then Layer, then Shade, but in one coat of paint to speed up the painting process.

Contrast paints were added to the Games Workshop paint range in 2019, promoted as speeding up the painting process for players. The existing range of paints was also expanded and reorganised when Contrast was released, and branding changed from Citadel to Citadel Colour. The previously available Glaze line of paints was discontinued, replaced with the introduction of the Air Clear paints, the previously available Edge line of paints were combined into the Layer line, with some colours also being renamed, and the previously separate Texture line of paints was combined into the Technical line.

== Role-playing games ==
Several of the miniatures games (e.g. Inquisitor) involve a role-playing element; however, Games Workshop has, in the past, published role-playing games set within the Warhammer universe. Warhammer Fantasy Roleplay was first published in 1986; a second edition appeared in 2005 published by Black Industries, part of GW's fiction imprint BL Publishing. In 2018 a 4th edition was published by Cubicle 7.

Warhammer 40,000: Dark Heresy, the first of three proposed role-playing games set in the Warhammer 40,000 universe, was released in late January 2008 and sold out almost immediately. In September 2008 production was transferred to Fantasy Flight Games.

Fantasy Flight Games subsequently published four other roleplaying games; Rogue Trader, Deathwatch, Black Crusade, and Only War, set in the same Warhammer 40,000 universe and employing similar mechanics.

=== Out of print ===
- Golden Heroes – a superhero roleplaying game, published in 1984 after initially being published on an amateur basis.
- Judge Dredd: The Role-Playing Game – published under licence in 1985.
- Stormbringer – the third edition of the game, published under licence from Chaosium in 1987.
- RuneQuest – GW published the second edition under licence from Chaosium, and the third edition under licence from Avalon Hill in the UK.
- Call of Cthulhu – GW published the second and third edition rules in the UK, along with their own adventures and supplements.
- Traveller – GW published Classic Traveller rules, supplements and adventures under licence from Game Designers' Workshop from 1979. They published their own supplement, character and starship sheets in 1981.
- In Search of New Gods – a roleplaying game adventure, published in 1986

=== Out of print, republished ===
The following games are technically out of print in their original editions, but have had new versions (in some cases heavily revised, and in some cases, with additional game expansions) published by Fantasy Flight Games.

- Dark Heresy – an RPG based in the WH40k Universe where players control one member of an Inquisitor's retinue.

== Board games ==
Games Workshop had a strong history in boardgames development, alongside the miniatures and RPGs. Several may have had roleplaying elements, or had miniatures included or produced. Spacefarers released in 1981 was one of these board games with a set of miniature rules especially designed for use with Citadel Miniatures' figures.

Licensing for an undisclosed proportion of Games Workshop's back catalogue of board games was transferred to Fantasy Flight Games as part of the same transaction which included Black Library's Role Playing Games. Fantasy Flight has republished revised editions of a number of these games. At the time of the announcement, Black Library had only one boardgame in print, the 4th Edition of "Talisman". Fantasy Flight subsequently released revised editions of Talisman and of other former Games Workshop boardgames. In September 2016, Fantasy Flight Games announced the termination of its licensing agreement with Games Workshop.

Games Workshop currently has several standalone board games in production.

- Assassinorum: Execution Force
- Blood Bowl
- Deathwatch: Overkill
- Gorechosen
- Lost Patrol
- Stormcloud Attack
- The Horus Heresy: Betrayal at Calth
- The Horus Heresy: Burning of Prospero
- Warhammer 40,000: Kill Team
- Warhammer Quest: Silver Tower

=== Out of print ===
- Apocalypse: The Game of Nuclear Devastation (not to be confused with the expansion Warhammer 40,000 Apocalypse).
- Battlecars
- Battle for Armageddon
  - Chaos Attack (Expansion for Battle for Armageddon)
- Block Mania – 2000AD Judge Dredd setting
  - Mega-Mania (Expansion for Block Mania)
- Blood Royale (multiplayer, battle and resource game of medieval Europe)
- Calamity
- Chainsaw Warrior (solo play game)
- Cosmic Encounter (under licence)
- Curse of the Mummy's Tomb
- Dark Future (similar to Car Wars)
- Doctor Who: The Game of Time & Space (1980)
- Doom of the Eldar
- Gobbo's Banquet
- Hungry Troll and the Gobbos
- Judge Dredd (see 2000 AD character Judge Dredd for background)
- Kings & Things (under licence)
- Oi! Dat's My Leg!
- Quirks (under licence)
- Railway Rivals (under licence)
- Rogue Trooper (see 2000 AD character Rogue Trooper for background)
- Squelch!
- Space Hulk
- Super Power
- Trolls in the Pantry
- Valley of the Four Winds
- Warlock
- The Warlock of Firetop Mountain (based on the Fighting Fantasy game book)

=== Out of print, republished ===
The following games are technically out of print in their original editions, but have had new versions (in all cases heavily revised and in some cases with additional game expansions) published by Fantasy Flight Games.

- Chaos Marauders – A boardgame of 'orcish mayhem'.
- Dungeonquest
- The Fury of Dracula
- Talisman
- Warrior Knights

== Trading card games (TCGs) ==
Games Workshop released a trading card game (TCG) in 2018 based on the Age of Sigmar universe called Warhammer Age of Sigmar: Champions Trading Card Game.

== Events ==
There were yearly Games Day events held by Games Workshop which was started in 1975, at Seymour Hall, London on 20 December 1975. It included the Golden Demon painting competition, news stands, sales stands, and tables to play on. In 2014 it was replaced by 'Warhammer Fest', similar but with additions such as demonstration pods and seminars.

=== Worldwide campaigns ===
Games Workshop has run numerous Worldwide Campaigns for its three core game systems. In each campaign, players are invited to submit the results of games played within a certain time period.

Each Warhammer campaign has had a new codex published with the rules for special characters or "incomplete" army lists. Below are listed the Games Workshop Worldwide Campaigns (with the campaign's fictional universe setting in parentheses):

- 1997 – A Dark Conspiracy (Warhammer)
- 2000 – Third War for Armageddon (Warhammer 40,000)
- 2001 – Dark Shadows (Warhammer)
- 2003 – Eye of Terror (Warhammer 40,000)
- 2004 – Storm of Chaos (Warhammer)
- 2005 – The War of the Ring (The Lord of the Rings Strategy Battle Game)
- 2006 – The Fall of Medusa V (Warhammer 40,000)
- 2007 – The Nemesis Crown (Warhammer)
- 2011 – Scourge of the Storm (Warhammer)
- 2023 – Battle for Oghram (Warhammer 40,000)

These Campaigns were run to promote its miniature wargames, and attracted interest in the hobby, particularly at gaming clubs, Hobby Centres and independent stockists. Forums for the community were created for each campaign, in addition to those on the main site, as a place to "swap tactics, plan where to post your results, or just chat about how the campaign is going."

In some cases special miniatures were released to coincide with the campaigns. The promotional "Gimli on Dead Uruk-hai" miniature, for example, was available only through the campaign roadshows or ordering online. As a whole these events have been successful. One, for example, was deemed "a fantastic rollercoaster", with thousands of registered participants.

== Magazines ==
Games Workshop's has published the White Dwarf magazine since 1977 and has over 500 issues. Games Workshop also published Fanatic Magazine in support of their Specialist Games range. After the cancellation of Fanatic Magazine, an electronic version, known as "Fanatic Online" was published from Games Workshop's Specialist Games website.

For a brief period in the mid-1980s GW took over publication of the Fighting Fantasy magazine Warlock from Puffin Books who had produced the first 5 issues. The magazine turned into a general introductory gaming magazine but was discontinued after issue 13.

There was also a fortnightly series called "Battle Games in Middle Earth", which came with a single or several free Lord of the Rings SBG miniatures. Though the miniatures were made by Games Workshop, the magazine itself was written by SGS (part of Games Workshop) and published by De Agostini.

== Spots the Space Marine trademark complaint ==
Games Workshop issued a trademark complaint against retailer Amazon, specifically relating to the novel Spots the Space Marine, claiming it violated their European 'space marine' trademark. Commentators such as Cory Doctorow and digital rights group the Electronic Frontier Foundation, questioned the right of Games Workshop to trademark the term. On 8 February 2013, Spots the Space Marine reappeared on Amazon. Games Workshop has issued no further legal action.

== Other media ==
Games Workshop illustrators also published artbooks covering parts of their commissioned work for the company. These include Adrian Smith, Ian Miller and John Blanche.

=== Short fiction ===
From 1997 to 2005, Black Library published INFERNO!, a magazine of short stories, artwork, and other features set in the various fictional universes of Games Workshop, and regularly featuring that of Warhammer 40,000. Since 2010, Black Library has produced a monthly eBook called "Hammer and Bolter," with the focus on short stories set in the different Games Workshop universes.

=== Music ===
In the late 1980s, the death metal band Bolt Thrower wrote lyrics dedicated to the Warhammer 40,000 universe, and used Warhammer 40,000 artwork on the cover of their second album, Realm of Chaos.

In the early 1990s, Games Workshop created its own short-lived record company, Warhammer Records. The first album released by the label was Oblivion, by D-Rok, in 1991. A fragment of one of the album's tracks, "Get Out of My Way", was used in the computer game Space Hulk, published by Electronic Arts in 1992. Another Warhammer Records-associated band, Wraith, released two albums, Danger Calling (1992) and Riot (1993) while with the label. The album, Psycho Dead Heads from Outer Space (1993) by Rich Rags was the final original album released under the label. Warhammer Records also held the UK distribution rights for Saxon's album Forever Free. The label was folded in 1993.

In the early 2000s, the German label Art of Perception produced a 12-part soundtrack vinyl series followed by three CD compilations. The task for the artists involved in this project was to conduct a theme for a species from the Warhammer 40.000 universe.

In 2009, the Singaporean death metal band, Deus Ex Machina, released I, Human, which makes numerous references to the Warhammer 40,000 universe, particularly the Adeptus Mechanicus faction.

In 2007 and 2015, the German death metal band Debauchery released several songs about the Chaos God Khorne, "Praise the Blood God", "True To The Skull Throne (And Bound To Kill)", and "Blood For The Blood God".

=== Film ===
Games Workshop announced that Exile Studios would produce a CGI movie based upon the Bloodquest graphic novel; a trailer was released, but the project was discontinued and Exile Studios disbanded.

For the 25th anniversary Games Day, Games Workshop released (for limited sale) a short movie entitled Inquisitor, using clips and footage that was created as a pitch to G.W. for a film deal. There were also trailers for two other films, "Hive Infestation" and "Blood for the Blood God". "Hive Infestation" pitted Space Wolf terminators against a genestealer cult infestation of a hive world. "Blood for the Blood God" was the second trailer released, and portrayed orks and Dark Angel marines fighting along with an inquisitor, much in the style of the Epic 40,000 video game cut scenes, but little information was given on this short film aside from a shot of a berserker of Khorne (available on YouTube but flagged by Games Workshop, removing the movie).

Another one was Damnatus, a German fan film developed over four years. Games Workshop announced in July 2007 that they would not give permission for the film to be released because of issues between Anglo-American copyright and Continental European Droit d'auteur.

In 2010, Games Workshop, with Codex Pictures, released a 70-minute downloadable film called Ultramarines. The screenplay was written by Black Library author Dan Abnett. Terence Stamp, Sean Pertwee and John Hurt headed the cast of voice actors.

In August 2021, Games Workshop launched Warhammer Plus, a subscription service that provides access to exclusive Warhammer-themed shows and animations, as well as other content such as classic issues of the White Dwarf magazine and exclusive miniatures.
