= Adeptus Titanicus =

Tabletop science fiction mecha game

- Designers: Games Workshop
- Publishers: Games Workshop
- Years active: 1988-2022
- Players: 2
- Setup time: 5 minutes
- Playing time: 45-90 minutes
- Chance: Dice rolling
- Website: www.warhammer-community.com/adeptus-titanicus/

Adeptus Titanicus is a tabletop science fiction mecha game first published by Games Workshop (GW) in 1988 based on the Warhammer 40,000 setting but at a different scale to the Warhammer tabletop games.

The particular setting is a period of civil war - the 'Horus Heresy' - where two factions within the Empire of Mankind fight for control. Within these factions are the Titans, towering bipedal war machines and each player controls one or more Titans.

The game led into a wider "Epic" scale tabletop games. The game was revised and expanded editions were released from 1994 to 2018.

== Description ==
Adeptus Titanicus is a turn-based tabletop wargame for two or more players who control scale models of giant walking titans.

The original Adeptus Titanicus and related Epic scale was about 6mm. The current version is 8mm.

The current edition of the game (2018 / AT18) is usually played on a 4x4' area and uses alternating activations.

== Publication history ==
=== First edition (Adeptus Titanicus) ===
GW published Adeptus Titanicus in 1988, a science fiction tabletop game designed by Jervis Johnson that features combat between "Imperial Titans" in the popular Warhammer 40,000 universe at the time of the Horus Heresy. The game came with:

- six 6mm scale "Battle Titans" with interchangeable weapons
- eight polystyrene buildings
- diecut counters
- a scale ruler
- various dice
- Titan cards
- 60-page rulebook

The combat system uses the "all move, all fire" system, where all moves by all units are resolved in order from fastest to slowest, and then fire results are resolved, with slowest units firing first.

Following the release of the game, the "Battle Titans" (later called "Warlord") were supplemented with smaller Titan models (Reaver and Warhound), other weapons (in metal) for customisation of Titans. The Eldar and Ork factions within the 40K universe were added as rules and models.

A supporting publication Codex Titanicus was published in December 1989 bringing codifying rules published in White Dwarf

The following year, GW released a companion game, Space Marine, a complete miniatures and rules set (for two opposing Space Marine armies) that could be played separately or in conjunction with Adeptus Titanicus. Numerous articles supporting the Adeptus Titanicus/Space Marine game were released in GW's White Dwarf magazine including a variety of optional rules, army lists and organisational charts.

=== Second edition (Titan Legions) ===
In 1994 GW released a second edition retitled Titan Legions, as well as a second edition of Space Marine, the two again published as compatible but stand-alone games.

Titan Legion included plastic miniatures for two factions. On one side Orks were represented with tanks and two "Megagargants" and the other was the Imperium with Imperial Knights and a single Imperator Titan, a particularly large model. For terrain, ruined buildings were printed card.

Various supplements were also produced between 1992 and 1994. GW also released many metal miniatures for use with both games.

=== Third edition (Epic 40,000) ===
The third edition by designers Jervis Johnson and Andy Chambers was retitled Epic 40,000 and released in 1997. In contrast to the previous two editions, this was released as just one set of rules. The game had a very short period of support (six months) from the company before it was withdrawn. Epic 40,000 never enjoyed the popularity of the previous two editions, and after support was reduced many of the miniatures planned for Epic 40,000 were never released.

Though it was not a commercial success for GW, designers Jervis Johnson and Andy Chambers still maintained that it was the best set of rules they conceived for this series, believing that this edition most rewarded good tactics over luck and special abilities.

=== Fourth edition (Adeptus Titanicus: The Horus Heresy) ===
In 2018, GW released Adeptus Titanicus: The Horus Heresy, designed by James Hewitt, again set during the Horus Heresy, 10,000 years before the main Warhammer 40,000 storyline. Several expansions were released between 2019 and 2022.

== Reception ==
In the April 1989 edition of Games International (Issue 4), James Wallis reviewed the first edition of Adeptus Titanicus, and although he found the rules "well prepared, laid out systematically and simply, and illustrated throughout by reference to an ongoing battle between two Titans", he soon found some issues with the combat rules, including lack of clarity about line of sight, lack of specific targeting of body parts, a random critical hit system, and close combat that was far deadlier than combat at medium range. He found the components themselves were average in production value, and the models of Titans to be quite fragile when clipped together. As he pointed out, "Glue is clearly needed, but that means you can't change the weapons or remove them if destroyed during the game, as the rulebook instructs." He concluded by giving the game a below-average rating of only 2 out of 5, saying, "Adeptus Titanicus is a flawed game. [...] It is not an inherently bad game, just a poor one."

The Chicago Tribune said that "Adeptus Titanicus is an entertaining science fiction game but, at this price, is not a particularly good value."

In a January 2020 review in the Dicebreaker website, Luke Shaw called Adeptus Titanicus: The Horus Heresy "Games Workshop's best game [...] a slick, modern reimagining of one of Games Workshop's oldest games, 1988’s identically-named Adeptus Titanicus." He concluded, "By avoiding weighing the system down with rules that tried to approximate interactions between mechs that can crush a tank column underfoot without a hitch, Titanicus became a game where the back and forth of gigantic god-engines feels palpable and exciting."

== Reviews ==
- Jeux & Stratégie #58
