= Epic (tabletop game) =

Tabletop wargame

Epic game
- Designers: Jervis Johnson, Andy Chambers
- Publishers: Games Workshop
- Years active: 1988 onwards
- Players: 2+
- Setup time: 5 - 30 minutes
- Playing time: 30 minutes - 3 hours
- Chance: Dice rolling
- Age range: 12+

Epic is a collective term for a series of tabletop wargames by Games Workshop set in their fictional Warhammer 40,000 universe. Whereas Warhammer 40,000 involves small battles between forces of a few squads of troops and two or three vehicles, Epic features battles between armies consisting of hundreds of soldiers, dozens of tanks, and giant war machines. Due to the larger size of the battles, and particularly the involvement of the Titan war machines, Epic miniatures conform to a smaller scale than those in Warhammer 40,000. It is roughly one quarter, with a typical human being represented with a 6mm high figure, as opposed to the 'heroic' 28mm miniature used in Warhammer 40,000.

In recent years other companies most notably Warlord Games and Mantic Games have also begun to release games branded as "Epic" to denote a smaller scale. All three companies produce smaller sized miniatures with modern Epic from Games Workshop being approximately 8mm, with 12mm from Mantic Games and 15mm from Warlord Games.

In the Warhammer Fantasy universe, Warmaster fills much the same "large scale battle" role as Epic does in Warhammer 40,000, though the two systems do not share rules, and Epic is intended for slightly smaller 6 mm miniatures.

Since its initial release in 1988, the series has gone through a number of incarnations with varying names and rule systems:

- 1988-1991: 1st Edition, Adeptus Titanicus (1988) and Space Marine, Epic Battles in the Age of Heresy (1st Edition) (1989).
- 1991-1997: 2nd Edition, Space Marine (2nd Edition) (1991) and Titan Legions (1994).
- 1997-2003: 3rd Edition, Epic 40,000 (1997).
- 2003-2023: 4th Edition, Epic Armageddon (2003).
- 2023: 5th Edition, Legions Imperialis (2023).

The 2nd, 3rd and 4th Editions are still played around the world, using the original rule set or fan-edited ones (see below).

== Gameplay overview ==
A game of Epic Armageddon between Imperial Guard and Eldar forces.

A standard game of Epic: Armageddon will normally take around two to three hours to play.

The major difference between Epic and other Games Workshop games is that instead of a player moving and firing all of their forces at once, players take turns moving one or two formations at a time using a variety of different "orders", giving the feeling of a battlefield developing in real-time, and also resulting in a game that is more tactically complex than Warhammer 40,000.

The comparatively smaller size of the miniatures also allows players to use many of the larger vehicles and creatures of the Warhammer 40,000 universe, such as Super-Heavy Tanks, Knights, and Titans even in small games, whilst also allowing longer ranged weapons such as artillery to be more realistically portrayed. Only recently did Warhammer 40,000 introduce Imperial Knights and Chaos Knights as playable factions; meanwhile Warhammer 40,000-scale Titans are available from Forge World.

Also of note is the introduction of blast markers: a simple system representing each formation's degree of morale and suppression under fire which, again, adds another dimension of realism over some wargames.

Epic's rule system incorporates Aircraft as well as ground units, and allows players to utilise many aircraft at once. Epic-scale aircraft are also used in the game Aeronautica Imperialis.

The monetary commitment needed to play Epic can be relatively small when compared with other Games Workshop products. Epic is comparable to Warhammer 40,000 Apocalypse in the sense that they both center around larger battlefields with a larger number of troops and vehicles in command, but the monetary investment is much smaller with Epic. Although Games Workshop and Forge World no longer offer a suitable line of troops and vehicles several companies and a thriving eBay trade have taken their place instead.

== Miniature availability and community support ==
Plastic and metal Epic miniatures were previously available through the Specialist Games section of Games Workshop's online store. with an additional lineup of resin models available via GW's Forge World subsidiary. However, as of September 2013 Games Workshop confirmed that further casting and support for Epic along with all other Specialist Games would cease with miniatures being no longer available as stocks ran out: during this time Forgeworld also ceased producing suitable miniatures much to the dismay and anger of many fans of the game.

Despite this decline in "official" support Epic retains a loyal, strong and passionate fanbase with much development still taking place across the world. The Tactical Command Forums are a hub for a worldwide support including hobby advice and painting blogs which has in turn spawned the Net Epic Armageddon (NetEA) organization and rules committee. MiniWars provides a centralized website for all Epic Players to locate opponents, gain information on miniatures past and present as well as look up statlines for each unit. Additionally Epic-UK provides a well run tournament scene within the United Kingdom as well as testing and releasing their own in house balanced army lists often based on those of the wider NetEA .

Playing a game kept alive by its popularity after the demise of official support and miniature production, Epic fans have found many suitable proxies in the ranges of other up and running miniatures companies that bear a suitable resemblance to the desired units. Of particular note are the Exodus Wars line from Steel Crown Productions who are also set to distribute Onslaught Miniatures for the UK and European Market. Additionally Troublemaker Games successfully crowdfunded a whole new line of miniatures in late 2013 that make suitable proxies for many epic forces including some of the first plastic 6mm sci-fi miniatures produced since Games Workshops last offerings.

With the launch of Legions Imperialis official figures are again available direct from Games Workshop.

== Adeptus Titanicus, Aeronautica Imperialis and Legions Imperialis ==
In 2018 Games Workshop released a new edition of Adeptus Titanicus. Designer James M. Hewitt says "While the game was clearly inspired by previous editions of Titanicus, as well as Epic, it's very much its own new thing. We tried to make it so that it has lots of detail, but still plays quickly. The overall gist is that it puts you in the command throne of an individual Titan, so you are directing the action as shields and limbs take damage and crew succumb to the rigors of battle."

The Aeronautica Imperialis game will now be limited to the Horus Heresy setting and units from the Warhammer 40,000 game are no longer available.

In July 2023 a version of the Epic game was announced for release in August 2023, but later delayed until December 2023, with preorders announced for November 18, 2023. Named Warhammer: The Horus Heresy – Legions Imperialis, the game is set 10 thousand years earlier than the previous Warhammer 40,000 setting with a return to the Horus Heresy setting of the initial Space Marine game.

Replacement bases for Adeptus Titanicus and Aeronautica Imperialis units have also been announced.

== Versions and game history ==
=== 1st edition ===
The rules for the first edition of Epic were published in two parts.

The Adeptus Titanicus (1988) rules and miniatures set, which dealt with battles between opposing Imperial Titans, was published first. Rules for infantry and vehicles (the troops and vehicles of the Heresy era Space Marines) followed in White Dwarf 109.

Space Marine, another miniatures and rules set (for two opposing Space Marine armies), followed after (in 1989). The two could be played as individual games or as a combined game.

Where Adeptus Titanicus included six plastic Titan models with swappable weapons and styrofoam buildings, Space Marine included folded card buildings with styrene roofs alongside its sprues of infantry and vehicles.

Numerous articles supporting the Adeptus Titanicus/Space Marine game were released in White Dwarf magazine including a variety of optional rules, army lists and organizational charts. The biggest supplement for the game was called Codex Titanicus (1989), which provided a medium for linking the Titan-based (giant robot) combat of Adeptus Titanicus with the conventional units (vehicles and infantry) of Space Marine 1st Edition. The codex also properly introduced Eldar Titans and Ork gargants

As months passed by, Adeptus Titanicus more or less stagnated apart from the introduction of smaller war machines called "Knights" (both Imperial and Exodite Eldar ones) and, later, the appearance of the mutated Chaos Titans. Space Marine, however, prospered with the release of a new army list system heavily based in semi-realistic orders of battle with support attachment, multi-tiered command structure and regimental/battalion levels. Imperial Guard, Ork, Eldar, Squat, Chaos, and Tyranid sprues of 6mm figures, artillery and support weapons were released while vehicles came in white metal and were sold in blisters containing, most often, two units apiece (single units appearing only in the case of larger models such as Shadowsword or Baneblade tanks).

=== 2nd edition ===
The second edition of Epic was again released as two compatible but stand-alone games, Space Marine (1991) which consisted of the core rules, and Titan Legions (1994) which contained enhanced rules for Titans.

Various supplements were produced, including Armies of the Imperium (1991), which gave rules for the Space Marines and Imperial Guard, Renegades (1992) which had rules for the forces of Chaos and the Eldar, Ork and Squat Warlords (1992), which featured the Orks and Squats, Hive War (1995), which featured the Tyranids and White Dwarf Presents Space Marine Battles (1993) which was mostly reprints of Epic-related articles from White Dwarf.

The Space Marine boxed game included three armies; the Space Marines (with their Land Raiders MkI and Rhinos), Orks (with their Battlewagons), and Eldar (with their Falcon Grav-Tanks). The Marines were depicted the same as their Warhammer 40,000 Second Edition counterparts. There was also the plastic Imperial Warlord Titan MkI (nicknamed the "Beetle" due to its curves, while later Warlord Titans have a more angular design) with interchangeable weapons. The Games Workshop studio army was the Blood Angels Space Marines and Eldar from the Alaitoc Craftworld.

Titan Legions was notable for introducing the Imperial Emperor-class Imperator Titan and the Ork Mega-Gargants, all of which were immensely powerful and could constitute small armies in their own right. These 'Mega' class vehicles could only be used in large games and none of the other races had such an equivalent. They were gradually phased out in later editions, though the current 4th edition has optional rules for them. The Imperator and Mega-Gargant are considered collector's items today (the only other time that Games Workshop released them was as a "reward" in return for getting a yearly subscription to White Dwarf in the November 1997 issue). Besides one Imperator and two Mega-Gargants, the boxed set also contained ten Imperial Knights (these "mini-Titans" are also collector's items) and twelve Ork Battlewagons.

The second edition of Epic was vastly popular and supported a huge range of miniatures.

A series of sculpts of Eldar Exodites, a Space Marine drop ship and other designs were made around the time of the Titan Legions debut, but were never officially released.

==== Fan made sequels: Netepic ====
NetEpic is the name given to the unofficial fan versions derived from the 2nd Edition rules, started originally because many players did not like the changes made for the third edition. The NetEpic variants are collaborative efforts, with work being coordinated through websites, Yahoo Groups, Discords and forums. They include a broad range of armies based on models from all the other editions, from the Warhammer 40,000 game, as well as some created especially for NetEpic itself.

Popular variants :

- Netepic Gold Rules are stable since March 2006 (version 5.0). They are the basis for all other Netepic rules variants. Army lists are in continuous development by an international community of players. Rules and army lists are available on the official website: EpiCentre - The Home of Netepic.
- Netepic Palladium is a variant created by the french community in 2020. Rules are "90% based on Netepic Gold". Army lists and rules updates are in continuous development. Rules and army lists are available in french and english on the official website: Netepic - Association Netepic.

=== Epic 40,000 (3rd Edition) ===
The third edition of Epic was released as Epic 40,000 in 1997. In contrast to previous editions, this was released as just one set of rules. The game had a very short period of support (six months) from the company before it was withdrawn. Epic 40,000 never enjoyed the popularity of the previous two editions, and after support was reduced many of the miniatures planned for Epic 40,000 were never released.

Though it was a failure for the company, designers Jervis Johnson and Andy Chambers still maintain that it was the best set of rules they ever conceived, as it was the game that most rewarded good tactics over luck and special abilities. This was achieved by streamlining the game mechanics and abstracting many of the areas which the previous editions had dealt with in specific detail. The current 4th edition of Epic still retains some of the third edition's streamlined game mechanics.

As noted above, Epic became more streamlined during the third edition, in order to fit entirely within three (relatively thin) A5 rulebooks (the Rulebook, the Armies Book and the Battles Book). Army and Company Cards were eliminated and detachments were picked from largely unrestricted detachment rosters of a very general type (Imperial Guard Infantry, Space Marine Armour and so on, in the case of the Imperial army list). Titans and Super-Heavies (now collectively War Engines) were simplified to the point that their rules were contained entirely within six pages of the new small-format rulebook.EPIC: Gods of War - Titans and War Engines

Collectively, this increased the speed of gameplay significantly, which was Games Workshop's stated aim, but it received a mixed reaction, in part because it was considered too abstract and no longer accounted for unique features of certain units.

The boxed set contained the armies of Space Marines (including Rhinos, Land Raiders MkII, and Whirlwinds) and Orks (with their Battlewagons and Stompas). The cover art showed a Blood Angels Space Marine advance pushing away the Orks. Games Workshop's 'studio' army during this period was the Imperial Fists chapter, a departure from previous feature armies which usually depicted the Ultramarines or Blood Angels. Armies for other races included the Imperial Guard, Eldar (studio armies were the Biel-Tan and Iyanden Craftworlds), and Tyranids. Imperial players had a choice of Space Marines or Imperial Guard, with support from Titan Legions. There were two distinct designs of Titan Legions, either Games Workshop's Mars-Pattern Titans which appear more traditional and ornamental with rounded shoulder pads (similar to a scaled-up Imperial Knight walker), or Forge World's Lucius-Pattern Titans which are more modern and angular (inspired by bipedal mechs in BattleTech).

Although miniatures from early editions were still playable and interchangeable, it was at this time they changed the basic base/stand size for infantry from square 20x20 to a longer version 10x40 which although they could be played or fielded in battle together it changed a lot for those who already had square based armies.

==== Official spin-off magazines and games ====
Spin-offs from this edition included the Epic Firepower magazine, an A5 magazine started in 1998 which ran for four issues (the first of which contained reprints from Citadel Journal and White Dwarf), the Epic 40,000 Magazine, an A4 magazine which picked up where Epic Firepower left off for 10 issues.

An additional rule set called Adeptus Titanicus II (AT-II) came out as a free download on the Fanatic website, which is now the Specialist Games web site, and was included in the Epic 40,000 Magazine. AT-II put a new twist on the original Adeptus Titanicus game and articles for it were also printed in the various Epic magazines until they were cancelled and later became a free webzine on the Specialist Games web site.

==== Fan made sequels ====
Epic Remastered is an initiative to collect and rationalize in a single place all the official rules revisions and extensions published by Games Workshop. The original rules are reorganized but not modified.

The Epic Remastered website.

=== Epic Armageddon (4th Edition) ===
Unlike previous editions of the game and other games produced by Games Workshop, the development of the game was conducted in an open way with 'trial' rules published on the Epic 'Playtest Vault' and feedback solicited from gamers via the associated playtesters forum.

The fourth edition of Epic, released in 2003, is often referred to as Epic: Armageddon after the first hard copy rulebook released for this edition. This includes the core game rules needed to play Epic:Armageddon as well as Army Lists of Space Marines, Imperial Guard and Orks.

The second rulebook released for the fourth edition was Epic: Swordwind, which was released both as hardcopy and as a downloadable PDF from the game's official website. Epic: Swordwind contains army lists for the Biel-Tan Eldar, the Baran Siegemasters, Imperial Guard Army and Warlord Snagga-Snagga's Feral Ork Horde. There has been active involvement of players with playtesting the new armies for the game on the Epic forums, with "army champions" co-ordinating playtesting and revision of the army lists. Unlike other Games Workshop games that use a generic army list for all deployments involving that army, Epic uses specific army lists that represent how an army was fielded in a specific military campaign. There have also been officially released army lists for Da Kult of Speed, an Ork army favouring bikes, the White Scars Space Marines, the Black Legion Chaos Space Marines, and The Lost and the Damned Chaos Cultist army.

The 4th edition also included rules and charts for the classic lines of Titan, including the Ork Mega-Gargant and the Imperator Titan. These were previously omitted from intermediate rulebook editions and their use made difficult given the deliberate absence of a points value befitting units of such scale. With work continuing on several community forums these units have once again been brought into use via some of the army lists.

Both "official" and "wider community sanctioned" versions of the rules are available as free download from Games Workshop and the newer Net Epic:Armageddon website as the 'NetEA Tournament Pack' which brings together all current community endorsed rules changed as well as new and experimental army lists. This collaboration with the community has continued to this day with the development of further army lists and races now playable (see below).

==== Playable armies ====
===== Games Workshops "official" armies =====
These armies are featured in releases made by Games Workshop:

- 'Codex' Space Marines
- White Scars Space Marines
- Imperial Guard Armageddon Steel Legion Mechanised Regiment
- Imperial Guard Baran Siegemasters Regiment
- Orks
- Feral Orks
- 'Speed Freek' Orks
- Eldar (Biel Tan Craftworld)
- Chaos Space Marines (The Black Legion)
- Chaos mortals (The Lost and the Damned)
- Tau Taros Campaign (as listed in Imperial Armor volume 3 The Taros Campaign, p. 282)

===== Net EA approved armies =====
In addition to changes to the above GW lists these armies have currently been "Approved" for play by the Net EA Rules Committee; a stamp of approval and balance:

- Adeptus Mechanicus Titan Legions
- Necrons
- Tyranids
- Tau Empire (Third Phase Expansion Force)
- Imperial Guard Death Korps of Krieg
- Imperial Guard Minervan Tank Legion
- Orkimedes' Gargant Big Mob
- Salamanders Space Marines
- Black Templars Space Marines
- Scions of Iron Space Marines
- Eldar (Alaitoc Craftworld)
- Dark Eldar

===== Net EA experimental and other regional armies =====
In addition to the above forces many other armies are available and suitable for play by both newcomers and veteran Epic players. These are currently headed as "Experimental". Some of these are:

- Blood Angels, Dark Angels, Imperial Fists, Raven Guard and Space Wolves Space Marines
- Cadian, Catachan, Elysian, Harkoni and Penal Legion Imperial Guard Regiments
- Skitarii Adeptus Mechanicus Ground Forces
- Grey Knights, Imperial Inquisition and Adepta Sororitas (Sisters of Battle)
- Knightworlds
- Blood Axe and Rebel Grot Ork Armies
- Iyanden, Mynameara and Ulthwe Eldar Craftworlds
- Iron Warriors and Red Corsairs Chaos Space Marines
- Squats

Both the UK and French communities have developed their own additional lists for tournament play.

== Computer Games ==
Final Liberation: Warhammer 40,000 Epic, a turn-based strategy game for the PC, was released in 1997.

Slitherine released a full Armageddon version of the game in 2015 called Warhammer 40,000: Armageddon. The game primarily puts you in charge of Imperial command mixed with various Space Marine Chapters. The game has a lot of DLC and features easily over 1,000 unit types. It boasts that no other game has gone into as much detail as it has. Due to its success it had a sequel shortly after featuring an Orc campaign featuring over 400 units. Although the game does not feature animated graphics and it uses an old tried and tested turn based strategy formula, the game is a hit with the community.

== Reception ==
Mark Donald reviewed Warhammer: Epic 40,000 for Arcane magazine, rating it a 7 out of 10 overall, and stated that "A slickly produced effort from Games Workshop who are past masters at this kind of thing. Everything you need is in the box, bar an enormous investment in miniatures. It's a quality item all right, and a very effective system, but the very scale of the game makes it less fun then Warhammer 40,000."

== Reviews ==
- Magia i Miecz (Issue 40 - Apr 1997) (Polish)
- Backstab #4
- Syfy

== See also ==
- Epic (play-by-mail game)
