= List of Games Workshop video games =

This is a list of video games published by or under license from Games Workshop.

== Warhammer Fantasy ==
The following games are set in the Warhammer Fantasy setting and are based on Warhammer, Blood Bowl, HeroQuest, Man O' War and Mordheim property.

Title	First released	Publisher	Developer	Genre	Platform	Notes
HeroQuest	1991	Gremlin Interactive	221b Software Development	Digital tabletop game, turn-based tactics	MS-DOS, Amiga, Amstrad CPC, Atari ST, Commodore 64, ZX Spectrum	Adaptation of the 1990 Milton Bradley and Games Workshop board game HeroQuest.
HeroQuest II: Legacy of Sorasil	1994	Gremlin Interactive	Gremlin Interactive	Role-playing	Amiga, Amiga CD32	
Blood Bowl	1995	MicroLeague		Sports	MS-DOS	Based on Games Workshop's 1986 board game Blood Bowl.
Warhammer: Shadow of the Horned Rat	1995	Mindscape	Mindscape	Real-time tactics	Windows, PlayStation	
Warhammer: Dark Omen	1998	Electronic Arts	Mindscape	Real-time tactics	Windows, PlayStation	
Warhammer: Battle for Atluma	2006	Namco Bandai	JV Games	Digital collectible card game	PlayStation Portable	Adaptation of the WarCry collectible card game.
Warhammer: Mark of Chaos	2006	Namco Bandai	Black Hole Entertainment	Real-time tactics	Windows, Xbox 360	
Warhammer: Battle March	2008	Namco Bandai	Black Hole Entertainment	Real-time tactics	Windows, Xbox 360	
Warhammer Online: Age of Reckoning	2008	Electronic Arts	Mythic Entertainment	Massively multiplayer online role-playing	Windows, macOS	
Blood Bowl	2009	Focus Home Interactive	Cyanide	Sports	Windows, Xbox 360, PlayStation Portable, Nintendo DS	
Warhammer Quest	2013	Rodeo Games		Digital tabletop game, tactical role-playing	iOS, Windows, Linux, macOS, Android, PlayStation 4, Xbox One, Nintendo Switch	Based on Games Workshop's 1995 board game of the same name.
Blood Bowl Tablet	2014	Focus Home Interactive	Cyanide	Sports, turn-based tactics	iOS, Android	
Blood Bowl 2	2015	Focus Home Interactive	Cyanide	Sports, turn-based tactics	Windows, PlayStation 4, Xbox One	Sequel to the 2009 Blood Bowl video game.
Mordheim: City of the Damned	2015	Focus Home Interactive	Rogue Factor	Turn-based tactics	Windows, PlayStation 4, Xbox One	Based on Games Workshop's 1999 tabletop skirmish game Mordheim.
Warhammer: End Times – Vermintide	2015	Fatshark		First-person shooter	Windows, PlayStation 4, Xbox One	
Blood Bowl: Kerrunch	2015	Cyanide		Sports, turn-based tactics	iOS, Android	
Warhammer: Snotling Fling	2015	Wicked Witch Software		Puzzle	iOS, Android	Angry Birds style puzzle game.
Warhammer: Arcane Magic	2015	Turbo Tape Games		Turn-based tactics	iOS, Android, Windows	
Total War: Warhammer	2016	Sega	Creative Assembly	Turn-based strategy, real-time tactics	Windows, Linux, macOS	
Man O' War Corsair	2016	Evil Twin Artworks		Action-adventure	Windows, Linux, macOS	Based on Games Workshop's 1993 tabletop game Man O' War.
Total War: Warhammer II	2017	Sega	Creative Assembly	Turn-based strategy, real-time tactics	Windows, Linux, macOS	Sequel to Total War: Warhammer.
Warhammer Quest 2: The End Times	2017	Perchang Games		Tactical role-playing	iOS, Android, Windows, macOS, Xbox One, Nintendo Switch, PlayStation 4	
Mordheim: Warband Skirmish	2017	Legendary Games		Tactical role-playing	iOS, Android	
Warhammer: Doomwheel	2017	Katsu Entertainment		Endless runner	iOS, Android	
Warhammer: Vermintide 2	2018	Fatshark		First-person shooter	Windows, PlayStation 4, Xbox One	
Blood Bowl: Death Zone	2018	Bigben Interactive	Cyanide	Sports, real-time tactics	Windows	
Warhammer: Chaosbane	2019	Bigben Interactive	Eko Software	Action role-playing	Windows, PlayStation 4, PlayStation 5, Xbox One, Xbox Series X/S	
Warhammer: Chaos & Conquest	2019	Tilting Point	Hunted Cow Studios	Massively multiplayer online real-time strategy	iOS, Android, Windows	
Warhammer: Odyssey	2021	Virtual Realms		Massively multiplayer online real-time strategy	iOS, Android	Based on 8th Edition Warhammer Fantasy tabletop rules.
Total War: Warhammer III	2022	Sega	Creative Assembly	Turn-based strategy, real-time tactics	Windows	Sequel to Total War: Warhammer II.
Blood Bowl 3	2023	Nacon	Cyanide	Sports, turn-based tactics	Windows, PlayStation 4, PlayStation 5, Xbox One, Xbox Series X/S, Nintendo Switch	Sequel to Blood Bowl 2.

== Warhammer Age of Sigmar ==
The following games are based on Warhammer Age of Sigmar property.

Title	First released	Publisher	Developer	Genre	Platform	Notes
Warhammer Age of Sigmar: Champions	2018	PlayFusion		Digital collectible card game	Windows, Android, iOS, Nintendo Switch	Allows cards to be scanned in from the tabletop card game.
Warhammer Age of Sigmar: Realm War	2018	Pixel Toys		Multiplayer online battle arena, digital collectible card game	Android, iOS	Clash Royale style game.
Warhammer Underworlds: Online	2020	Steel Sky Productions		Turn-based tactics	Windows	Online multiplayer only.
Warhammer Quest: Silver Tower	2020	Perchang Games		Tactical role-playing	iOS, Android, Windows	
Warhammer Age of Sigmar: Storm Ground	2021	Focus Home Interactive	Gasket Games	Turn-based strategy	Windows, PlayStation 4, Xbox One, Nintendo Switch	
Warhammer Age of Sigmar: Tempestfall	2021	Carbon Studio		Action-adventure	Windows	Virtual reality game.
Warhammer Age of Sigmar: Realms of Ruin	2023	Frontier Developments		Real-time strategy	Windows, PlayStation 5, Xbox Series X/S	
Warhammer Survivors	2026	Auroch Digital		Vampire Survivors–like	Windows	Vampire Survivors spinoff featuring elements from Warhammer: Age of Sigmar and Warhammer 40,000.

== Warhammer 40,000 ==
The following games are based on Warhammer 40,000, Adeptus Titanicus, Epic, Space Hulk, Space Crusade, Necromunda, Battlefleet Gothic, The Horus Heresy, Aeronautica Imperialis and Warhammer 40,000 Roleplay property.

Title	First released	Publisher	Developer	Genre	Platform	Notes
Space Crusade	1992	Gremlin Interactive		Digital tabletop game, turn-based tactics	MS-DOS, Atari ST, Amiga, ZX Spectrum, Commodore 64, Amstrad CPC	Adaptation of the 1990 Milton Bradley and Games Workshop board game Space Crusade.
Space Hulk	1993	Electronic Arts	Electronic Arts	Tactical shooter	MS-DOS, Amiga, NEC PC-9801	Loosely based on the 1989 board game Space Hulk.
Space Hulk: Vengeance of the Blood Angels	1995	Electronic Arts	Key Game	Tactical shooter	MS-DOS, Windows, 3DO, PlayStation, Sega Saturn	
Final Liberation: Warhammer Epic 40,000	1997	SSI	Holistic Design, Inc.	Turn-based tactics	Windows	
Warhammer 40,000: Chaos Gate	1998	SSI	Random Games Inc.	Turn-based tactics	Windows	
Warhammer 40,000: Rites of War	1999	SSI	DreamForge	Turn-based strategy	Windows	
Warhammer 40,000: Fire Warrior	2003	THQ	Kuju Entertainment	First-person shooter	Windows, PlayStation 2	
Warhammer 40,000: Dawn of War	2004	THQ	Relic Entertainment	Real-time strategy	Windows	
Warhammer 40,000: Dawn of War – Winter Assault	2005	THQ	Relic Entertainment	Real-time strategy	Windows	Expansion for Dawn of War.
Warhammer: Space Hulk	2005	THQ	Mnemonic Studios	Action	N-Gage	
Warhammer 40,000: Dawn of War – Dark Crusade	2006	THQ	Relic Entertainment	Real-time strategy	Windows	Stand-alone expansion for Dawn of War.
Warhammer 40,000: Glory in Death	2006	THQ	Razorback Developments	Turn-based strategy	N-Gage	
Warhammer 40,000: Squad Command	2007	THQ	RedLynx	Turn-based strategy	PlayStation Portable, Nintendo DS	
Warhammer 40,000: Dawn of War – Soulstorm	2008	THQ	Iron Lore Entertainment	Real-time strategy	Windows	Stand-alone expansion for Dawn of War.
Warhammer 40,000: Dawn of War II	2009	THQ	Relic Entertainment	Real-time strategy	Windows, Linux	Sequel to Warhammer 40,000: Dawn of War.
Warhammer 40,000: Dawn of War II – Chaos Rising	2010	THQ	Relic Entertainment	Real-time strategy	Windows, Linux	Stand-alone expansion for Dawn of War II.
Warhammer 40,000: Dawn of War II – Retribution	2011	THQ	Relic Entertainment	Real-time strategy	Windows, Linux	Stand-alone expansion for Dawn of War II.
Warhammer 40,000: Kill Team	2011	THQ	THQ Digital Studios UK	Twin-stick shooter	Windows, PlayStation 3, Xbox 360	No longer available for sale.
Warhammer 40,000: Space Marine	2011	THQ	Relic Entertainment	Third-person shooter, hack and slash	Windows, PlayStation 3, Xbox 360	
Space Hulk	2013	Full Control		Turn-based tactics	Windows, Linux, macOS, iOS, Wii U, PlayStation 3, PlayStation Vita, PlayStation 4, Android	A direct rule by rule video game adaptation of the 1989 board game Space Hulk. Ported to Android in 2016 by Hoplite Research with some gameplay differences.
Warhammer 40,000: Armageddon	2014	Slitherine	The Lordz Games Studio & Flashback Games	Turn-based strategy	Windows, macOS, iOS, Android	
Warhammer 40,000: Space Wolf	2014	HeroCraft		Turn-based tactics, deck-building	Windows, iOS, Android, PlayStation 4	
Warhammer 40,000: Carnage	2014	Roadhouse Interactive		Run and gun, hack and slash	iOS, Android, Windows, Linux, macOS	Released for Windows, Linux and macOS as Warhammer 40,000: Carnage Champions. No longer available for sale.
Warhammer 40,000: Storm of Vengeance	2014	Eutechnyx		Tower defence	Windows, iOS, Android	
Space Hulk: Ascension	2014	Full Control		Turn-based tactics	Windows, Linux, macOS, PlayStation 4, Xbox One	
Warhammer 40,000: Regicide	2015	Hammerfall Publishing		Turn-based tactics	Windows, iOS, Android	
The Horus Heresy: Drop Assault	2015	Complex Games		Real-time strategy	iOS, Android	
Warhammer 40,000: Deathwatch – Tyranid Invasion	2015	Rodeo Games		Turn-based tactics	iOS, Android, Windows, PlayStation 4	Released for Windows and PlayStation 4 as Warhammer 40,000: Deathwatch – Enhanced Edition.
Legacy of Dorn: Herald of Oblivion	2015	Tin Man Games		Adventure, role-playing	Windows, iOS, Android	No longer available for sale.
Warhammer 40,000: Freeblade	2015	Pixel Toys		Rail shooter	Windows, iOS, Android	
Eisenhorn: Xenos	2016	Pixel Hero Games		Action-adventure	Windows, iOS, Android	
Battlefleet Gothic: Armada	2016	Focus Home Interactive	Tindalos Interactive	Real-time strategy	Windows	Based on Games Workshop's 1999 board game Battlefleet Gothic.
Battlefleet Gothic: Leviathan	2016	Grand Cauldron		Turn-based strategy	Android, iOS	Based on Games Workshop's 1999 board game Battlefleet Gothic. Now unavailable, except for a free trial version.
Warhammer 40,000: Eternal Crusade	2016	Bandai Namco Entertainment	Behaviour Interactive	Arena shooter	Windows	Permanently discontinued as the servers were taken offline on the 10th of September 2021.
Talisman: The Horus Heresy	2016	Nomad Games		Digital tabletop game	Windows, iOS, Android	Based on Talisman and Fantasy Flight Games' 2013 board game Warhammer: Relic.
Space Hulk: Deathwing	2017	Focus Home Interactive	Streum On Studio	First-person shooter	Windows, PlayStation 4	An updated version subtitled Enhanced Edition was released in 2018.
The Horus Heresy: Battle of Tallarn	2017	HexWar Games		Turn-based strategy	Windows, iOS, Android	Titled Battle of Tallarn on iOS and Android.
Warhammer 40,000: Dawn of War III	2017	Sega	Relic Entertainment	Real-time strategy	Windows, Linux	Sequel to Warhammer 40,000: Dawn of War II.
Warhammer 40,000: Sanctus Reach	2017	Slitherine Software	Straylight Entertainment	Turn-based strategy	Windows	Based on the 2014 Warhammer 40,000 campaign books The Red Waaagh! and Hour of the Wolf.
Warhammer 40,000: Inquisitor - Martyr	2018	Bigben Interactive	NeocoreGames	Action role-playing	Windows, PlayStation 4, Xbox One	A stand-alone expansion titled Prophecy was released in 2019.
Warhammer 40,000: Gladius – Relics of War	2018	Slitherine Software	Proxy Studios	4X, turn-based strategy	Windows, Linux	
Warhammer The Horus Heresy: Legions	2018	Everguild		Digital collectible card game	iOS, Android, Windows	
Space Hulk: Tactics	2018	Focus Home Interactive	Cyanide Studio	Turn-based tactics	Windows, PlayStation 4, Xbox One	
Warhammer 40,000: Mechanicus	2018	Kasedo Games	Bulwark Studios	Turn-based tactics	Windows, MacOS, Linux, Nintendo Switch, Xbox One, PlayStation 4	Based on Games Workshop's 2018 Warhammer 40,000 expansion Forgebane.
Battlefleet Gothic: Armada 2	2019	Focus Home Interactive	Tindalos Interactive	Real-time strategy, 4X	Windows	Sequel to Battlefleet Gothic: Armada.
Warhammer 40,000: Inquisitor - Prophecy	2019	NeocoreGames		Action role-playing	Windows	Stand-alone expansion for Warhammer 40,000: Inquisitor – Martyr.
Warhammer Combat Cards	2019	Flaregames	Well Played Games	Digital collectible card game	iOS, Android, Windows	Titled Citadel Combat Cards during development and originally scheduled for release in 2018. Based on the physical Citadel Combat Cards (various editions published since 1989).
The Horus Heresy: Betrayal at Calth	2020	Steel Wool Studios		Turn-based strategy	Windows	Based on Games Workshop's 2015 board game of the same name. Virtual reality mode supported. No longer available for sale.
Necromunda: Underhive Wars	2020	Focus Home Interactive	Rogue Factor	Turn-based tactics	Windows, PlayStation 4, Xbox One	Based on Games Workshop's 2017 tabletop skirmish game Necromunda: Underhive.
Warhammer 40,000: Dakka Squadron	2020	Phosphor Games Studio		Aerial shooter	iOS, Android, Windows	Released for Windows as Warhammer 40,000: Dakka Squadron - Flyboyz Edition.
Aeronautica Imperialis: Flight Command	2020	Green Man Gaming	Binary Planets	Turn-based strategy	Windows, PlayStation 4, Xbox One	Based on Games Workshop's miniature wargame Aeronautica Imperialis. No longer available for sale.
Warhammer 40,000: Battle Sister	2020	Pixel Toys		First-person shooter	Oculus Quest, Oculus Quest 2	Virtual reality game.
Adeptus Titanicus: Dominus	2021	Membraine Studios		Turn-based tactics	Windows, PlayStation 4	Based on Games Workshop's miniature wargame Adeptus Titanicus. No longer available for sale.
Warhammer 40,000: Lost Crusade	2021	Nuverse	Orca Games	Massively multiplayer online real-time strategy	iOS, Android	
Necromunda: Hired Gun	2021	Focus Home Interactive	Streum On Studio	First-person shooter	Windows, PlayStation 4, PlayStation 5, Xbox One, Xbox Series X/S	
Necromunda: Gang Skirmish	2021		Legendary Games	Turn-based tactics	iOS, Android	
Warhammer 40,000: Battlesector	2021	Slitherine Software	Black Lab Games	Turn-based tactics	Windows, PlayStation 4, Xbox One, Xbox Series X/S	
Warhammer 40,000: Chaos Gate - Daemonhunters	2022	Frontier Foundry	Complex Games	Turn-based tactics	Windows	Sequel to Warhammer 40,000: Chaos Gate. Gameplay inspired by X-COM.
Warhammer 40,000: Tacticus	2022	Snowprint Studios	Snowprint Studios	Turn-based tactics	Android, iOS	
Warhammer 40,000: Shootas, Blood and Teef	2022	Rogueside		Run and gun	Windows, Nintendo Switch, PlayStation 4, PlayStation 5, Xbox One, Xbox Series X/S	
Warhammer 40,000: Darktide	2022	Fatshark		First-person shooter	Windows, Xbox Series X/S, PlayStation 5	
Warhammer 40,000: Boltgun	2023	Focus Entertainment	Auroch Digital	First-person shooter	Windows, PlayStation 4, Nintendo Switch, PlayStation 5, Xbox One, Xbox Series X/S	
Warhammer 40,000: Rogue Trader	2023	Owlcat Games		Role-playing	Windows, macOS, Nintendo Switch 2, PlayStation 5, Xbox Series X/S	Based on Fantasy Flight Games' tabletop RPG of the same name.
Warhammer 40,000: Space Marine 2	2024	Focus Entertainment	Saber Interactive	Third-person shooter, hack and slash	Windows, PlayStation 5, Xbox Series X/S	Sequel to Warhammer 40,000: Space Marine.
Warhammer 40,000: Warpforge	2024	Everguild		Digital collectible card game	Windows, Android, iOS	
Warhammer 40,000: Boltgun - Words of Vengeance	2025	Auroch Digital		Typing	Windows	Based on Warhammer 40,000: Boltgun.
Warhammer 40,000: Speed Freeks	2025	Wired Productions	Caged Element	Vehicular combat, racing	Windows	
Warhammer 40,000: Space Marine – Master Crafted Edition	2025	Sega	SneakyBox	Third-person shooter, hack and slash	Windows, Xbox Series X/S	Remastered version of Warhammer 40,000: Space Marine.
Warhammer 40,000: Dawn of War – Definitive Edition	2025	Relic Entertainment		Real-time strategy	Windows	Remastered version of Warhammer 40,000: Dawn of War.
Warhammer 40,000: Mechanicus 2	2026	Kasedo Games	Bulwark Studios	Turn-based tactics	Windows, PlayStation 5, Xbox Series X/S	Sequel to Warhammer 40,000: Mechanicus.
Warhammer 40,000: Boltgun 2	2026	Big Fan Games	Auroch Digital	First-person shooter	Windows, PlayStation 5, Xbox Series X/S	Sequel to Warhammer 40,000: Boltgun.
Warhammer 40,000: Dawn of War IV	2026	Deep Silver	King Art Games	Real-time strategy	Windows	
Warhammer Survivors	2026	Auroch Digital		Vampire Survivors–like	Windows	Vampire Survivors spinoff featuring elements from Warhammer: Age of Sigmar and Warhammer 40,000.
Supremacy: Warhammer 40,000	TBA	Stillfront Group	Twin Harbour Interactive	Wargame	Windows, Android, iOS	
Warhammer 40,000: Dark Heresy	TBA	Owlcat Games		Role-playing	Windows, PlayStation 5, Xbox Series X/S	Based on Black Industries and Fantasy Flight Games' tabletop RPG of the same name.
Warhammer 40,000: Space Marine 3	TBA	Focus Entertainment	Saber Interactive	Third-person shooter, hack and slash	TBA	Sequel to Warhammer 40,000: Space Marine 2.
Total War: Warhammer 40,000	TBA	Sega	Creative Assembly	Turn-based strategy, real-time tactics	Windows	

== Other games ==
The following games are based on Games Workshop intellectual property but not set in the Warhammer Fantasy, Warhammer Age of Sigmar or Warhammer 40,000 settings.

Title	First released	Publisher	Developer	Genre	Platform	Notes
Apocalypse: The Game of Nuclear Devastation	1983	Red Shift	Games Workshop	Wargame	ZX Spectrum	Based on Games Workshop's board game of the same name.
Battlecars	1984	Games Workshop		Vehicular combat, racing	ZX Spectrum	
D-Day	1984	Games Workshop		Wargame	ZX Spectrum	
Tower of Despair	1984	Games Workshop		Interactive fiction	ZX Spectrum, Commodore 64	
Chaos: The Battle of Wizards	1985	Games Workshop		Turn-based tactics	ZX Spectrum	
Journey's End	1985	Games Workshop		Role-playing	ZX Spectrum	
Talisman	1985	Games Workshop		Digital tabletop game	ZX Spectrum	Based on the 2nd Edition of Games Workshop's 1983 board game of the same name.
Chainsaw Warrior	2013	Auroch Digital		Digital tabletop game	Windows, iOS, Android	No longer available for sale.
Talisman: Prologue	2013	Nomad Games	Nomad Games	Digital tabletop game	Windows, iOS, Android	Titled Talisman: Prologue HD on iOS and Android.
Talisman: Digital Edition	2014	Asmodee Digital	Nomad Games	Digital tabletop game	Windows, iOS, Android, macOS, PlayStation 4, PlayStation Vita, Nintendo Switch, Xbox One, Xbox Series X/S	Based on Talisman's 4th Edition rules.
Chainsaw Warrior: Lords of the Night	2015	Auroch Digital		Digital tabletop game	Windows, iOS, Android	No longer available for sale.
Dark Future: Blood Red States	2019	Auroch Digital		Vehicular combat, real-time tactics	Windows	
Talisman: Origins	2019	Nomad Games		Digital tabletop game	Windows, iOS, Android	Based on Talisman's 4th Edition rules. Focused on solo play.
Fury of Dracula: Digital Edition	2020	Nomad Games		Digital tabletop game	Windows, iOS, Android, Xbox One, Xbox Series X/S	Based on the 4th Edition of Games Workshop's 1987 board game of the same name.
Talisman: Digital 5th Edition	2024	Nomad Games		Digital tabletop game	Windows, iOS, Android	Based on Talisman's 5th Edition rules.

== Cancelled games ==
The following games were cancelled before being generally launched to the market.

Title	Cancelled	Publisher	Developer	Genre	Platform
Castle of Lost Souls	1984	Games Workshop		Interactive fiction	ZX Spectrum
Kult of Speed	1994	Electronic Arts		Racing	Amiga
Warhammer 40,000: Agents of Death	1999	N/A	Mirage Media	First-person shooter	Windows
Gorkamorka	2000	Ripcord Games		Action	Windows, Dreamcast
Warhammer Online: Wrath of Heroes	2013	Electronic Arts	BioWare Mythic	Multiplayer online battle arena	Windows
Warhammer 40,000: Dark Millennium	2013	THQ	Vigil Games	Action	Windows
Warhammer 40,000: Dark Nexus Arena	2016	Whitebox Interactive		Twin-stick shooter, multiplayer online battle arena	Windows
Total War Battles: Warhammer	2021	Sega	NetEase & Creative Assembly	Turn-based strategy, real-time tactics	iOS, Android
Warhammer Age of Sigmar: Soul Arena	2024	Trophy Games		Autobattler	Windows, Android, iOS
