= The Warlord (board game) =

Board game

The Warlord is a board game of nuclear conquest designed and self-published by Mike Hayes in 1974. Games Workshop published a simplified version titled Apocalypse in 1980.

== Description ==
The Warlord is a game of conquest for 2–7 players similar to Risk, albeit with nuclear weapons. The game map covers Europe. Players vie to conquer the entire map, the last one standing being declared the winner.

=== Setup ===
All city areas are distributed to the players at random. A player is chosen to go first.

=== Components ===
The first edition (red box) contains:

- Four-part map of Europe and North Africa
- 140 counters in seven colours
- 140 radiation counters (black)
- missile counters
- city cards
- rules sheet

=== Gameplay ===
A turn uses the following sequence: fire missiles, build armies, move, attack.

==== Build armies ====
During the "build armies" phase, each city can produce one new army unit, but two linked suburban areas are needed to produce an army. Unpopulated areas do not produce any armies. Built armies can be placed in any area that can be linked back to where they were built.

==== Movement ====
As with Risk, a stack of armies can only move from one area into an empty area, leaving one unit behind to occupy the initial area.

==== Combat ====
To resolve combat, the attacking player chooses a number between 1 and the total number of possible attacking units from one area (up to a maximum of six). The attacking player then turns a die to this number and conceals it under a cup. The defending player tries to guess the number under the cup. If the defender is correct, the attacker loses that number of units. If the defender guesses wrong, the defender loses an army from the area being attacked. If this results in an empty area, the attacker must move the number of units that had been indicated on the concealed die into the area.

Terrain has an effect on combat: a player attacking a mountain area may only use the numbers 1, 2 or 3. A player defending a sea area gets two guesses.

==== Fire missiles ====
Whenever a successful attack is made, the attacker gets a missile, which can be placed in any area linked to the one from which the attack was made. If there is already a rocket there, the second rocket may be added to the first to make a two-stage rocket. There is no limit to how large a rocket can be. The rocket's range is dependent on the number of stages, so a one-stage rocket can hit all adjacent areas, a two-stage rocket can hit any areas two away, and so on.

When a hydrogen bomb hits an area, it destroys all armies in the area and renders it radioactive, making it impassable to all armies. In addition, armies in all the adjacent areas are also removed from the board, those areas are also irradiated, and any missiles in those areas go off. Areas adjacent to the secondary areas are also denuded of all armies, but are not radioactive.

An atomic bomb has a similar effect, but smaller in scope—only the original strike area is radioactive, and all armies are removed from the strike area and all adjacent areas.

A radioactive areas stays impassable to all armies for the rest of the game.

If there is a missile in an area that is successfully occupied, then the occupier is now the new owner of the missile.

=== Victory conditions ===
Play continues until there is only one player left. If all armies are eliminated by a nuclear chain reaction, the game ends in a stalemate.

== Publication history ==
In 1974, Mike Hayes, a student at University of Sheffield, self-published a game of nuclear war in Europe for 2–7 players packaged in a plain red box and titled The Warlord. Hayes republished the game in 1978 in a blue box.

In 1980, Games Workshop acquired the rights from Hayes and revised the game, simplifying the rules, removing hydrogen bombs, reducing the number of players to 4, allowing radioactive areas to be cleaned, and cutting the board map in half (eliminating Eastern Europe). This revised game was released as Apocalypse: The Game of Nuclear Devastation.

After Apocalypse went out of print, Mike Hayes reacquired the rights and republished his full original game, retitled Classic Warlord, in 2012.

== Computer game ==
A computer game version, Apocalypse: The Game of Nuclear Devastation, was published by Red Shift under license from Games Workshop in 1983 for the ZX Spectrum and BBC Micro.

== Reception ==
The Warlord was chosen for inclusion in the 2007 book Hobby Games: The 100 Best. The British game designer Steve Jackson commented in the book, "This title is my candidate for Best Game of All Time. As a game design it is 'perfectly simple.' For an overview, think 'Nuclear Risk in Europe.'"

== Reviews ==
- Games & Puzzles #69
