= Tacticus =

Tacticus may refer to:

== People ==
- Aeneas Tacticus, a 4th century BC Greek writer on the art of war
- Aelianus Tacticus, a 2nd century AD Greek military writer
- Asclepiodotus Tacticus, a 1st century BC Greek philosopher

== Other uses ==
- General Tacticus, a fictional Discworld character
- Warhammer 40,000: Tacticus, a turn based tactical mobile game

== See also ==
- Tacitus (disambiguation)
