= City of the Damned =

City of the Damned may refer to:

- City of the Damned, a Judge Dredd storyline
- "City of the Damned", the second movement of the Green Day song "Jesus of Suburbia"
- Mordheim: City of the Damned, a tactical role-playing game
