= Tacitus (disambiguation) =

Tacitus was a Roman historian and senator.

Tacitus may also refer to:

- Tacitus (emperor), Roman emperor in 275–276
- Tacitus (crater), a lunar impact crater, named after the Roman historian
- Tacitus (horse) (foaled 2016), an American Thoroughbred racehorse
- 3097 Tacitus, an asteroid named after the Roman historian

== See also ==
- Tacticus (disambiguation)
- Tacitus bellus, or Graptopetalum bellum, a succulent plant
