= Warhammer: Shadow of the Horned Rat =

1995 video game

- Developer: Mindscape
- Publisher: Mindscape: NA: SSI (PS1)
- Designers: Steve Leney; Richard Castle; Jeff Gamon; Andy Jones; Gavin Moore
- Composers: James Hannigan; Mark Knight
- Series: Warhammer Fantasy
- Platforms: Windows, PlayStation
- Release: Windows; November 11, 1995; PlayStation: NA: November 1, 1996; PAL: December 1996
- Genre: Real-time tactics
- Mode: Single player

Warhammer: Shadow of the Horned Rat is a single-player fantasy real-time tactics computer game based upon the Warhammer Fantasy Battle table-top game and miniatures. It was developed and published by Mindscape, and released in November 1995 for Microsoft Windows, and on PlayStation in November 1996. The game's story takes place within the Warhammer Fantasy world setting, and focuses on players managing a group of mercenaries, who take on work for various clients but become involved in stopping a plot by the Skaven. The game's main focus is on battles that feature a mixture of medieval warfare and fantasy elements, using a variety of units based upon those from within the Warhammer setting.

Following its release, the game received mixed feedback with some criticism made over elements of its gameplay. A sequel to the game was later released in 1998, entitled Warhammer: Dark Omen, with the game being later made available at GOG.com in 2015.

== Gameplay ==
All of the game focuses on a single-player campaign, in which the players take control of a mercenary force within Games Workshop's Warhammer Fantasy world setting, managing their army, deciding on what units to take on a mission, how many reinforcements a unit is given, and what missions are undertaken. While the campaign focuses upon a linear path, the player has the freedom to determine what path the story takes, as well as undertaking optional missions for extra gold crowns – the choices made also impacts what units a player receives, and what battles they face. Each mission features a briefing that outlines the goals the player will be given, and provide a fee for the mercenary's services – an advance fee if the mission is taken (and if provided), and a competition fee once the mission is over, minus any penalties occurred by the player per any special arrangements that must be adhered to (i.e. not allowing any innocents to be killed), and including bonuses the player receives (i.e. the number of kills made). Once a mission is chosen, the player then selects the units they will use for it, with each unit that is chosen deducting a fee from the player's coffers – by default, the player must always use the unit commanded by the mercenary leader, while some units the player can use do not charge a fee if selected.

Units in the game are based upon those from the Warhammer setting, ranging from cavalry, infantry, ranged, artillery, magic users, and specialised troops. What units a player can use depends on the player's overall progress in the campaign – more units become available later on in the game to hire, though some depend on the path the player is taking, while at times the player gains access to certain units that remain with temporarily until after a certain milestone (i.e. completing a chain of missions). Once the player has chosen their units, they then proceed with the mission, with most often consisting of at least one battle to take on. Conflict takes place on a battlefield, which differs between battles, often with various forms of obstacles and terrain, with enemy units varying in type and when they appear – some are already in the battle, while others arrive after some time. Before a battle, players can deploy their units where they wish within a designated deployment area, during a "Deployment Phase", though this is not possible when the player's army is ambushed during a march; instead, they must begin a fight with their units arranged in the manner chosen when setting out the marching formation. Once a battle begins, the objective mainly is to rout the enemy units that appear on the battlefield, while failure occurs mainly when the player loses all units who either are killed or routed.

Like other battlefield based RTS games like Total War, players can change the formation of their units, charge them into enemies, and allow the game's AI to control their behaviour with enemy units. The game also features a special "boost" system, in that the player can give a temporary boost to a unit's strength when engaged with an enemy, though this must be used sparingly, in order to not ignore other units in the battle. Shadow of the Horned Rat incorporates the use of magic in battles, in a more primitive manner to that of later titles such as King Arthur: The Role-Playing Wargame. Magic units a player can control can use magic spells in battle, with more spells made available as the unit improves from further usage – each spell has a cost, and consumes power, which is displayed on a special meter in the player's HUD interface; if the player has no power available, no spells can be used. In addition, units can make use of magic items to help them out – some can be used for a temporary amount of time, others for the duration of a battle, while some require the player to choose a target. More magic items can be found during the course of the campaign, with some hidden within a select number of battlefields.

Once a battle is over, the player is given a debriefing, which provides a rundown on how many enemies were killed, what losses were made in a unit, and how much experience a unit receives. Losses are divided into two types – injured soldiers of a unit are unable to return until after the next battle, while those killed must be replaced between battles and missions, often when the army is in a town, with the number available to reinforce the unit varying at times. Units which receive experience, often from killing enemies, will eventually get stronger and more skillful in battle, though the cost of replacing lost soldiers increases as a result – a unit's level of experience is represented by skulls, with one skull indicating an inexperienced unit, and four skulls representing an elite unit.

== Plot ==
Following a raid on the tower of a sorcerer, a skaven grey seer named Thanquol discovers that a crystal in their possession is actually a piece of a runic crystal that can power an ancient elven artifact known as the Menhir, allowing it to channel magic wherever one directs it. Seeking to use it to conquer the Old World, Thanquol launches a search for the other pieces, while creating a specially enchanted axe that allows him to manipulate an orc warboss named Urgat Rip-Eye into launching raids against the humans and dwarves in order to weaken them and divert their attention. At the same time, Thanquol orders a hunt for an elf named Ceridan, who could impede Thanquol's plans by warning others of the encroaching danger.

Whilst working within the Border Princes, Morgan Bernhardt, commander of the "Grudgebringer" mercenaries, is approached by Sven Carlsson, one of the aforementioned princes, who contracts him into capturing a rogue border prince working with the Skaven. However, the Skaven kill the prince and then attack Carlsson's hometown while the mercenaries conduct a patrol for him, capturing his adviser Ilmarin. Bernhardt manages to rescue him along with a dwarven regiment seeking to warn their king of increased Skaven activity, only to learn that Ilmarin is, in reality, Ceridan, a ranger from the Black Mountains, who has become increasingly concerned with the Skaven activity and requests the need to go to Loren Forest. Upon learning that Carlsson was captured by orcs, Ceridan requests Bernhardt's aid to rescue him.

Following his success, Bernhardt does what he can to combat the raids by the orcs in the Border Princes, while learning that the dwarven fortress of Zhufbar has come under attack from Skaven and orc forces. Eventually, he and Ceridan find themselves forced to travel to Zhufbar, whereupon the mercenaries become involved in helping with the dwarves' defence of the fortress. When the sceptre belonging to King Ungrunn, ruler of Zhufbar, is stolen by the Skaven, Ceridan reveals himself as a descendant of the ancient elves who created the Menhir, during the war between the elves and dwarves, explaining that the Skaven are seeking to find its location at the ruins of Ulthuan and use it. Concerned with the Menhir's power, despite knowing the Skaven must not find it, Ungrunn contracts Bernhardt to escort an envoy of his to the city of Nuln in order to meet with Emperor Karl Franz and request his aid in combating the Skaven's plot; in addition, he also provides a regiment of dwarves to help him, with the secret intention that they destroy the Menhir upon it being located.

Upon arriving in Nuln, Bernhardt and Ceridan meet with Franz and relay what they know about the Skaven's plot. After initially deciding to deliberate the matter with his council, Franz decides to provide aid upon learning that the pair intend to continue towards Loren without waiting for his response. After escorting Ungrunn's envoy to a dwarven fort in the Grey Mountains, the mercenaries finally make it to Loren and assist the elves within the wood against Skaven attacks. However, Thanquol finally finds the remaining piece of the crystal and with it, locates Ulthuan. Realising that the Menhir has been located, Ceridan advises Bernhardt to journey to the elven ruins, guiding the army with the runic crystal's sister stone embedded in his family's sword. While en route back to Nuln, Bernhardt's mercenaries defeat a large orc army, killing Urgat during the battle. Upon reaching Ulthan, the army encounters more Skaven, and launch an assault to stop them using the Menhir.

If the player fails to retake the Menhir in the final battle, Thanquol channels the artifact to make him into a powerful Skaven entity called the Horned Rat, which begins attacking the Empire and bringing destruction and chaos across the Old World. If the player lets the dwarves destroy the Menhir while defeating the Skaven, Ceridan considers the action as unjustified, citing that the dwarves were ignorant of what the artifact could do, and thus vowing that the elves will seek revenge for what they did. If the player lets the elves secure the Menhir while defeating the Skaven, Ceridan forces the dwarves to leave the artifact alone and let it be protected by the elves, before Bernhardt returns with him to Nuln to receive a hero's welcome for foiling the Skaven plot.

== Reception ==
Reception

Review scores
Publication	Score
GameSpot	6.8/10 (WIN); 3.6/10 (PS1)
Next Generation	3/5 (WIN, PS1)
Arcane	8/10
PC Games	B

Reviewing the Windows version, a Next Generation critic said that while the interface does not allow for precision control of units, the 3D battlefields instigate plenty of thoughtful strategies. He criticized the graphics and long load times, and summarized that "Warhammer delivers a unique strategic challenge. But with the game's awkward interface and drab graphics, you may find that you have to work at enjoying it." Trent Ward of GameSpot also found the interface's difficulty with selecting individual units a problem, but highly praised the plot, voice acting, animation, combat system, and strategic challenge, and concluded, "Warhammer's fantastic character development, addictive warfare system, and absorbing story override most of its interface failings, and most strategy fans will find this title an excellent addition to their game libraries." He also commented that the game's mixture of wargame and RPG elements would appeal to fans of either genre.

Steve Faragher reviewed Warhammer: Shadow of the Horned Rat for Arcane magazine, rating it an 8 out of 10 overall. Faragher commented that "Perhaps the most impressive thing about it is that you don't have to be a Warhammer player to enjoy this immensely. Shadow of the Horned Rat stands up on its own merits – as a very clever mix of strategy and wargame."

Shadow of the Horned Rat was a runner-up for Computer Gaming World's 1995 "Strategy Game of the Year" award, which ultimately went to Command & Conquer and Heroes of Might and Magic (tie). The editors called Shadow of the Horned Rat "a real-time strategy game with all the richness of the Warhammer tabletop game", and noted that it "could have won had the competition not been so strong."

The PlayStation version was less well-received, though not because of the quality of the conversion. For example, GamePro commented, "A mediocre title for the PC a year ago, Warhammer: Shadow of the Horned Rat retains its mediocrity on the PlayStation." Contradicting Trent Ward, GameSpot's Hugh Sterbakov opined that the mixture of wargame and RPG "is a confusing amalgam of the two, with the strengths of neither". Reviewers generally criticized the unclear menu icons, the player's lack of control over the outcome of individual skirmishes, and the indistinct and undetailed gameplay graphics, which they said both make battles less exciting and make it hard to differentiate between units. However, Next Generation found Warhammer: Shadow of the Horned Rat to be one of the stronger real-time strategy games to appear on consoles, arguing that the sheer depth and complexity of the game, along with its longevity, more than make up for its shortcomings.

== See also ==
- Warhammer: Dark Omen
- List of Games Workshop video games
