= Hive city =

Type of arcology

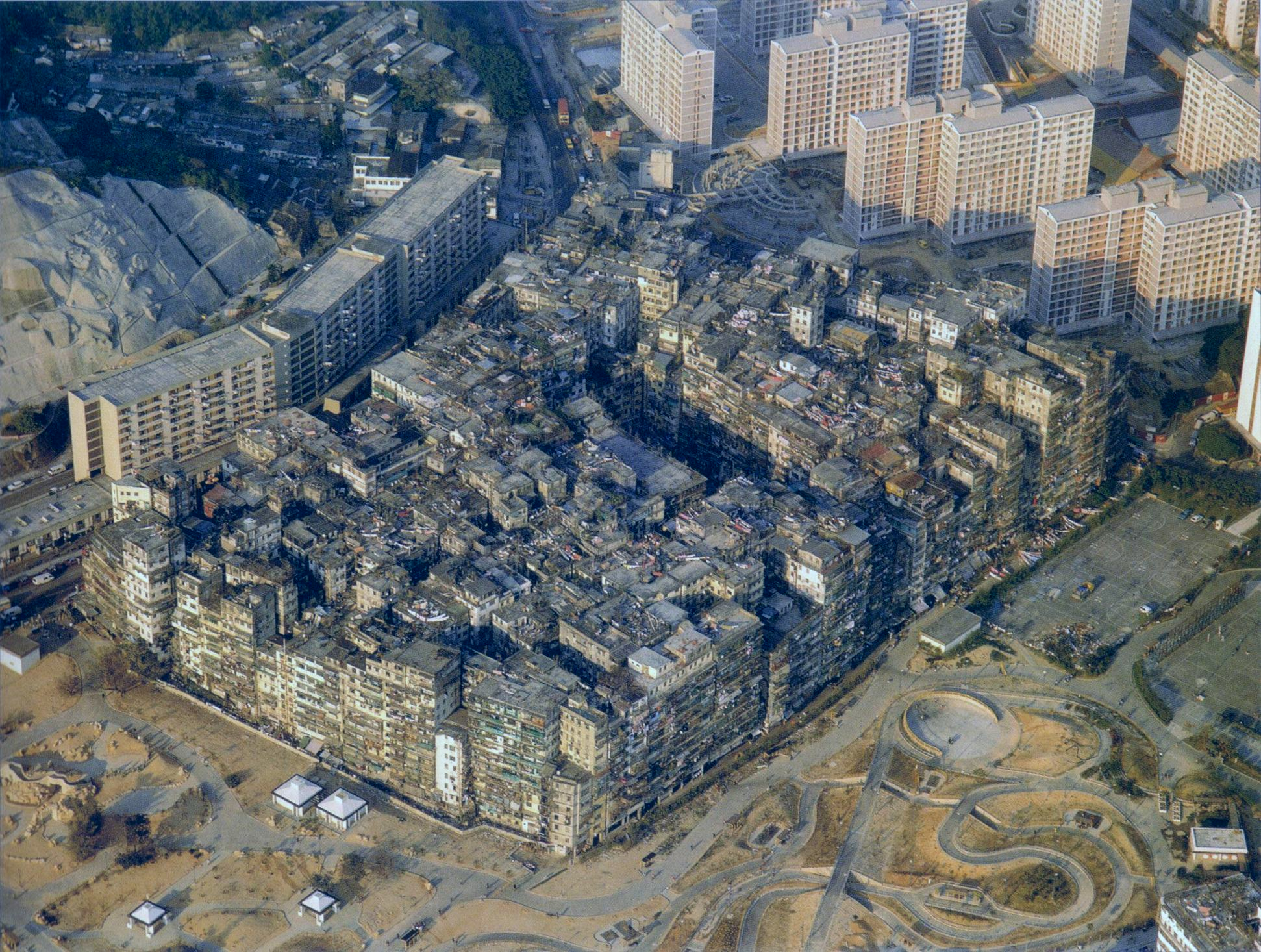
Kowloon Walled City, a former slum in Hong Kong, has been mentioned as an example of a hive-like site.

A hive city is a type of arcology or vertical city that closely resembles a beehive in its density and organization. As early as Virgil's Aeneid, comparisons have been made between certain cities, namely Carthage, and beehives. Today, the term is used in both science fiction, especially in the Warhammer 40,000 universe, and in urbanism.

== In science fiction ==
In the science fiction universe of Warhammer 40,000, hive cities are urban agglomerations primarily set apart by their massive size, both in height and population. They are built into foundations sunk deep into a planet's crust, and can stretch miles into the sky. The bulk of a hive city's area is taken up by manufactories, and the living conditions for those who work in them are characteristically poor. The lower levels of a hive city are consumed by gang violence, overcrowding, and disease. The upper levels, known as spires, are home to wealthy aristocrats with access to sunlight and luxurious amenities. One well-known example of a hive city in Warhammer is that of Necromunda, which is also the setting for several spin-off wargames.

== In urbanism ==
Indian sociologist Radhakamal Mukerjee used the term bee-hive city to describe the increasingly haphazard urban development of slums and tenement neighborhoods in the mid-20th century. Mukerjee claimed that while such expansion and density were due to technological advances, the way to overcome and move past them was still new technology. One particular site that has been called hive-like is the Kowloon Walled City, a former slum in Hong Kong.

In a paper on potentially biophilic "future cities" in 2021, architect Benz Kotzen used science fiction hive cities as an example of what a dystopian outcome of vertical cities might look like. Referencing Warhammer 40,000, Kotzen pointed out that a sufficiently large arcology would inevitably damage its surrounding environment by dumping waste and expelling pollution.
