= Space Crusade (video game) =

1992 video game

- Developer: Gremlin Interactive
- Publisher: Gremlin Interactive
- Producer: Peter J. Cook
- Artist: Adrian Carless
- Composer: Barry Leitch
- Series: Warhammer 40,000
- Platforms: Amiga, Atari ST, MS-DOS, Amstrad CPC, Commodore 64, ZX Spectrum
- Release: 1992
- Genre: Turn-based tactics
- Modes: Single-player, multiplayer

Space Crusade is a 1992 video game based on the Space Crusade board game. It is the first video game set in the Warhammer 40,000 universe. Gremlin Graphics Software Ltd. released the video game version of Space Crusade in early 1992. It was available on Amiga, Atari ST, MS-DOS, Amstrad CPC, Commodore 64, and ZX Spectrum. It later received an expansion pack, The Voyage Beyond.

== Gameplay ==
Space Crusade is considered a faithful conversion of the original boardgame, with a digital board that could be viewed from both a 2D and isometric view.

== Reception ==
Reception

Awards
Publication	Award
Crash	Crash Smash
Sinclair User	SU Classic
Your Sinclair	Megagame
Amstrad Action	Mastergame

Space Crusade was praised for being a faithful conversion of the boardgame. The ZX Spectrum version was voted number 24 in the Your Sinclair Readers' Top 100 Games of All Time.

CU Amiga called Space Crusade "a classic strategy game". Amiga Computing called Space Crusade "one hell of a game". The reviewer from Amiga Action said that he had "no reservations in recommending this game to everyone, especially commanders with prior experience in the Adeptus Astartes". The reviewer form The One for Amiga Games wrote that the game's pros "more than outweigh the cons and make Space Crusade a very worthwhile product, especially with the prospect of plenty of data disks to liven things up". The reviewer form The One for Amiga Games stated that "Space Crusade retains much of the original feel of the board game, but the computer format adds some great touches you'd be hard pressed to imitate physically, short of tipping lighter fluid over the board characters and lighting them as they get blown away". Amiga Format called Space Crusade "fun, not fast-paced joystick-bashing fun, but you're your thoughtful, war-gamey, tactical move-type, with some mindless blasting thrown in". The reviewer from Amiga Mania wrote that Space Crusade has "a lot of nice effects, touches and tweaks which a great game needs to lift itself above its competitors".

== Expansion ==
Space Crusade: The Voyage Beyond is an expansion pack to Space Crusade. It was released in 1992 for the Amiga and Atari ST. It adds 10 new levels. A compilation that included the main game and expansion was released around the same time.

The reviewer from CU Amiga gave a positive response to the game. The reviewer from Amiga Power called the game "definitely quality stuff and well up to the original's standards". The reviewer from The One Amiga called it "a simplistic but fun RPG that is never less than engrossing". The reviewer from Amiga Format stated that "The Voyage Beyond expands upon a good strategy game".
