= Warhammer 40,000: Mechanicus =

2018 video game

- Steam store art
- Developer: Bulwark Studios
- Publisher: Kasedo Games
- Series: Warhammer 40,000
- Platforms: Windows, Linux, macOS, PlayStation 4, Nintendo Switch, Xbox One
- Release: November 15, 2018 (PC); July 17, 2020 (PS4, Switch, Xbox One)
- Genre: Turn-based tactics
- Mode: Single-player

Warhammer 40,000: Mechanicus is a turn-based tactics video game developed by Bulwark Studios and published by Kasedo Games for the PC in November 2018. It is based on Games Workshop's tabletop wargame Warhammer 40,000. A sequel, Warhammer 40,000: Mechanicus 2 was announced on May 23rd, 2024.

== Gameplay ==
Warhammer 40,000: Mechanicus is the first video game to feature the Adeptus Mechanicus, a faction of cybernetically enhanced warrior priests. The game features turn-based tactical combat in the style of the XCOM series. Cognition points (CP) dictate how many actions characters can take on their turn.

== Release ==
Warhammer 40,000: Mechanicus was developed by Bulwark Studios, a studio based in Angoulême, France. Mechanicus was announced on February 21, 2018 for Windows, Linux, and macOS. It was released on November 15, 2018. Heretek expansion was released on July 23, 2019. Console versions for PlayStation 4, Nintendo Switch, and Xbox One were released on July 17, 2020.

== Reception ==
Reception

Aggregate scores
Aggregator	Score
Metacritic	78/100 (PC); 67/100 (PS4); 72/100 (Switch); 79/100 (Xbox One)
OpenCritic	64% recommend

Review scores
Publication	Score
4Players	76/100
Eurogamer	8/10
GameStar	79/100
IGN	8.5/10 (Italy); 7.8/10 (Spain)
Nintendo Life	8/10
Nintendo World Report	7/10
Push Square	7/10
Multiplayer.it	7.5/10
PC Invasion	9/10
Strategy Gamer	4/5 (PC); 3/5 (Switch)

According to the review aggregate website Metacritic, the PC and Xbox One versions of Warhammer 40,000: Mechanicus received "generally favorable reviews", while PlayStation 4 and Switch versions received "mixed or average reviews". Fellow review aggregator OpenCritic assessed that the game received strong approval, being recommended by 64% of critics.

Nic Reuben of Rock Paper Shotgun criticized the difficulty level: "[T]here's just no bite to it, and it sadly ends up undermining itself as a result. If difficulty options get patched in though, grab it in a heartbeat. It's so close to being fantastic it hurts." Rich McCormick of Rock Paper Shotgun included the game among the five best games of 2018.

PJ O'Reilly of Nintendo Life summarized: "Warhammer 40,000: Mechanicus successfully fuses deep and rewarding turn-based strategy with impressively flexible customisation and some truly excellent world-building."

Jason Rodriguez of PC Invasion reviewed the Heretek expansion and gave it six out of ten saying: "With limited new content, repeating your old romp, and a handful of bugs, it proves to be a disappointment that likes of which will bring shame to the Omnissiah."

The game was included in Eurogamer's list of "The best Warhammer 40k games to play in 2022". Rock Paper Shotgun ranked the game 29th on its list of "the best strategy games on PC". PC Gamer listed the game second on its list of best Warhammer 40,000 games.
