= Talisman: Digital Edition =

Talisman: Prologue/Digital Edition
- Developer: Nomad Games
- Publishers: Asmodee Digital; Nomad Games
- Platforms: Windows, iOS, Android, macOS, PlayStation 4, PlayStation Vita, Nintendo Switch, Xbox One, Xbox Series X/S
- Release: Prologue; December 18, 2012 (PC); April 25, 2013 (iOS); May 1, 2013 (Android); Digital Edition; 25 February 2014 (PC); January 13, 2015 (Mac); March 7, 2017 (PS4, Vita); March 9, 2020 (Switch); June 3, 2021 (Xbox One, Series X/S)
- Genre: Role-playing
- Modes: Single-player, multiplayer

Talisman: Digital Edition is a digital board game developed by British studio Nomad Games and based on the Talisman board game by Games Workshop and Fantasy Flight Games. It follows the board game's Fourth Edition rules.

A single-player version of the game for Windows and mobile platforms known as Talisman: Prologue was released on November 15, 2012.

On May 1, 2013, Thumbstar Games released Talisman: Prologue for Android 2.2, this version also still lack multiplayer or other players directed by computer. On September 3, 2014, a new version was released that supports AI-controlled characters and local multiplayer.

Talisman: Digital Edition, the full multiplayer version of the game, was originally stated for release during the summer of 2013, but after a number of postponements, was finally released on 25 February 2014.

== Reception ==
Reception

Aggregate score
Aggregator	Score
Metacritic	76/100 (iOS, Prologue); 51/100 (PC, DE); 66/100 (PS4, DE); 63/100 (Switch, DE)

According to the review aggregate website Metacritic, Prologue received "generally favorable reviews", while Digital Edition received "mixed or average reviews".
