= Necromunda =

Tabletop war game

Battle for survival in the Nightmare Undercity
- Designers: Andy Chambers, Jervis Johnson, Rick Priestley
- Illustrators: Geoff Taylor, John Blanche, Wayne England, Mark Gibbons, Des Hanley
- Publishers: Games Workshop (Specialist Games)
- Years active: 1995-2003 (original version)
- Players: 2–4
- Playing time: 60 minutes
- Chance: High (dice rolling)
- Age range: 12+
- Website: https://www.warhammer.com/en-US/other-games-necromunda-lp

Necromunda (officially 'Warhammer Necromunda Skirmish' since 2026) is a skirmish tabletop war game originally produced by Games Workshop in 1995. It has been relaunched as Necromunda: Underhive in 2017.

In Necromunda, players control rival gangs battling each other in the Underhive, a place of anarchy and violence in the depths below the hive city. As in its parent game Warhammer 40,000, Necromunda uses 28 mm miniatures (approximately 1:56) and terrain (in this case, the Underhive – a heavily polluted, underground industrial environment).

Necromunda allows players to develop their gangs between battles, gaining experience, gaining and losing new members or equipment, according to a set of rules. Gangs that frequently win games acquire more credits (money) and fewer injuries and so are able to grow throughout a campaign.

Necromunda also stands out by having a more three-dimensional table layout, with buildings generally having multiple floors, interconnecting walkways, and bridges. The terrain is constructed to simulate a hive city on the planet Necromunda, a dystopian futuristic city resembling a termite mound many miles high.

== Game setting ==
In the game of Necromunda, the eponymous setting is a world covered in polluted ash wastes, the result of thousands of years of heavy industry with no kinds of environmental safeguards whatsoever. Scattered amidst these seas of effluent and unstable continents of compacted dross and ash are between six and nine (the source material is inconsistent) "hive cities". These are massive man-made structures, reminiscent of termite mounds on a staggering scale. So large that they break through the upper atmosphere and can serve as tethering points for starships, the hive cities are described as housing over a trillion people each.

This purpose of a "hive world" like Necromunda, is to be a manufacturing centre to provide equipment for the boundless legions of the Imperial Guard and Space Marines, as well as lay down new hulls for the Imperial Navy. The hive cities produce billions of tons of manufactured goods daily. In return for these services, the hives are described as being supplied with billions of tons of food and raw ore every day, serviced by bevies of ships that make commutes between the hive world and neighbouring planets that are mining or agricultural worlds. The Necromunda world is ruled by a single lord with little interaction from the rest of the Empire so the usual WH40K armies would not be present.

=== Houses of Hive Primus ===
In the game the population of the hive city is divided into several 'houses' of genetically distinct people, who apparently do not mix or interbreed, they serve as the various factions for the players to control to play the game. The houses are described as such:

==== Orlock ====
House Orlock is known as the House of Iron because its foundations lie upon deep ferrous slag pits. This massive resource has led to the largest profession in the house being miners. While not only iron miners, this is their largest export. They have an exclusive contract with House Ulanti (Mad Donna's House) for the export of raw materials that they took from House Delaque through questionable means.

The structure of the House is significantly different due to its size. No single rule, but rather groups of families ally to form power structures within Orlock. A figurehead is maintained to make relations with other houses easier, which as a practical matter enables House Orlock to remain strong strategically despite its fractious nature. (In this wise it is something of a microcosm of Hive Primus itself.) Not only because of its size, but because it is centrally located, Orlock borders all other houses. Along with marriages, most notably the current Lady Ko'Iron, House Orlock is ideally situated for trade with all other houses. Even Escher has respect for Orlock due to how much power women wield in the house. The notable exception to these good relations is House Delaque who are bitter over the loss of the Ulanti Contract, but they only share a mile-long border. This rivalry makes the employ of Seek and Destroy to Nemo particularly odd.

Due to their familial structure, gangs are usually an extension of that. Gangs members tend to be older and are more likely to be female than most other houses because they are frequently families themselves. This makes gangs better organised and more willing to work with other Orlock gangs than other houses. The downside to this familial bond is when there are Orlock rivalries they are much more bloody than in other houses. As is probably true of most gangs, they are not averse to slaving if the money is right Cardinal Crimson and their garb tends to be classic biker look. Official models and artwork.

From a player perspective, Orlock is considered the "default" house with no notable strengths or weaknesses, with their gangers getting access to Combat, Ferocity, and Shooting skills.

==== Cawdor ====
House Cawdor is the stronghold of the Cult of Redemption. For this reason, all of the gangers wear masks in public to hide their faces from the 'infidels' of the other houses, and are known to utilise scavenged equipment due to their background as bone pickers and scavengers. They are known to hunt mutants and heretics to the point of fanaticism (part of the Redemptionist influence) which brings them into conflict with gangs who would utilise them.

From a player perspective House Cawdor is a fast-moving close combat house with the gangsters having access to Combat, Ferocity, and Agility skills.

==== Delaque ====
Other hivers are justifiably suspicious of House Delaque, who specialise in spying and assassination. The gangers often wear large trench coats, with large internal pockets for concealing weapons and other large items. Most are bald and extremely pale. Many wear visors, goggles, or have light filters implanted into their eyes, sensitivity to light being a common Delaque weakness. Delaque territory is even more dimly lit than the rest of the hive, fitting for a people who shrouded in mystery.

From a player perspective, House Delaque are the ranged specialists, with their gangers having access to Shooting, Agility, and Stealth skills.

==== Escher ====
Strikingly different from the other houses, the Escher population is almost entirely made up of women. The few men that are there are shrivelled and imbecilic and play no part in the normal affairs of the Escher. Men are held in contempt and pitied by the Escher, especially those of House Goliath who are seen as simple, brutish and unsophisticated.

From a player perspective, House Escher is a fast-moving and hard-to-hit close combat gang with their gangers having access to Combat, Agility, and Stealth skills.

==== Goliath ====
The domain of House Goliath is situated unfavourably within the hive city and occupies some of the deepest and harshest areas. By way of compensation, the Goliaths are tough and persistent by inclination. They consider the hivers of other Houses to be soft and slack. In truth all hivers are naturally robust, being inured to the toxins and deprivations which they accept unquestioningly as part of normal life. The Goliaths, however, take a stubborn pride in their ability to endure hardship. The other Houses see the Goliaths as barbaric, and unpredictable. Goliath institutions such as the fighting pits and the Feast of the Fallen do nothing to dispel the impression of a violent people inimical to their neighbours. Size and strength are seen as the measure of a man. Their style of dress emphasises a preoccupation with physique, featuring weighty chains and spiked metal bracers.

From a player perspective, House Goliath is a slow-moving close combat gang, being the only house to have gangers with access to Strength skills, and also having Combat and Ferocity skills.

==== Van Saar ====
House Van Saar is renowned for the quality of its technical products. Its technology is no more advanced than that of anyone else, technological progress being almost non-existent throughout the Imperium of Man, but the manufacturing processes are precise and its finished materials are of the highest quality. The Noble Houses pay a premium for Van Saar goods, and as a result, the House is probably the wealthiest in Hive City. The Van Saar are marked out by their tight-fitting bodysuits which help to sustain them in the harsh hive environment. Semi-permeable membranes in the suit reduce the loss of body moisture whilst various spots on the material change color to warn the wearer of airborne toxins and reduce oxygen levels. Older Van Saar are often seen sporting a neatly trimmed beard.

From a player perspective, House Van Saar is the only house whose gangers have access to tech skills - and they back this up with shooting and combat skills.

=== Other groups ===
==== Enforcers ====
The Enforcers are the chief source of law enforcement in the underhive of Necromunda. Modelled closely after the Adeptus Arbites, the Enforcers apply the laws set down by the High Lords of Terra with an iron fist. Equipped with heavy armour and sophisticated weapons and equipment, Enforcer patrol teams quell riots, suppress inter-gang warfare as much as possible, and monitor mercantile trade to ensure compliance with imperial law.

The Enforcers, while maintaining an organisational structure similar to that of the Adeptus Arbites, are a separate force. The Adeptus Arbites enforce Imperial law on a galactic scale, whereas the Enforcers maintain order within the confines of Hive Primus.

Although ten reliable enforcers are available to the player, standard combat encounters limit deployment to five units, regularly resulting in a numerical disadvantage against enemy forces.

==== The Cult of the Emperor's Redemption ====
A nod to Laserburn—the 15 mm tabletop game Warhammer 40,000 evolved from (Note: The Disciples of the Red Redemption had appeared in Warhammer Fantasy Battle in 1987.)—the Redemptionists have an extreme hatred of mutants and deviants from the Imperial creed. The most dedicated among them take up arms and hunt these mutants and deviants. They often wear red robes decorated with flame motifs and favour incendiary weaponry. House Cawdor lends much support to the cult of Redemption and has gone so far as to adopt it as their official religion. Their favoured weapon is the flamer, as the Redemptionist war cry is "Cleanse with blood and with flame!"

From a player perspective, the Redemptionists are chiefly known for two things; the one-shot flamers they can buy cheaply and put in two-handed weapons and the ability for the Priest leading many such gangs to convert captured enemies.

==== Pit Slaves ====
Slaves of the Guilder's appendages are replaced by industrial tools such as giant saws and drills. When a group of slaves escapes, they already have weapons to help them survive along with experience gained in gladiator-style combat they are often pressed into.

From a player perspective, Pit Slaves are all experienced and expensive, having no cannon fodder. They also all have one of their arms replaced by an expensive close combat weapon.

==== Ratskins ====
The Ratskin tribes have lived within the underhive for millennia and treat it as a god, generous in its bounty and merciless in its vengeance. They have little to do with the hivers and are rarely encountered, preferring to steer clear of the heathens who desecrate their sacred hive by poisoning its sacred places.

From a player perspective, Ratskins are a fast close combat gang with no heavies to provide covering fire. They are also less affected by attrition than most gangs; injured Ratskins may re-roll the injury table results at the end of the battle, but they must accept the second result.

==== Scavvies ====
Scavvies are humans with mutations too obvious to hide, banished from normal settlements. In Scavvie gangs, the very dregs of society scrape out an existence robbing guilder caravans, raiding isolated settlements, and just generally scavenging whatever they can to survive. Their bands often include a stable sub-species of mutant, the giant reptilian Scalies. Scavvies have often been known to use bait to lure Plague zombies to attack rival gangs during their raids.

From a player perspective, Scavvies do not get anyone who carries heavy weapons and are not good at ranged attacks in general. On the other hand, the Scalies are the most powerful default close combat troops in the game, and they get a random number of disposable troops, such as plague zombies, for free each battle, providing them with targets that allow the rest of the gang to advance safely.

==== Spyre Hunters ====
Young nobles from the Spire come down to hunt underhive gangsters and thereby prove their worth in a world of ruthless politics, plotting, and assassination. Spyre gangs are few in number, and equipped with state-of-the-art weaponry (this can include heavily customised power armour). It is reported that they get at least some of their technology from trading with the Tau Empire.

From a player perspective, Spyre Hunters are a very small and extremely well-equipped elite gang and are the only gang that can not replace any casualties they suffer.

==== Alternative gangs ====
In addition to the gang types supported by the rulebooks, various Games Workshop publications have introduced new groups, sometimes supported by mail-order only model ranges, including Ash Waste Gangsters, Imperial Guard, various Chaos Cult gangs, Genestealer Cults, Ork warbands, and Squat Miners.

== History ==
Necromunda was spun off from a previous attempt of Games Workshop to popularise a set of rules for low-key skirmish battles in a Hive World setting. White Dwarf published such a ruleset between autumn and winter 1990–91 as Confrontation, based on Bryan Ansell's Laserburn game. It was set on the hive world of Necromunda (Note: Rick Priestley said he could not remember who coined the name but "it sounded like me".) but made no reference to houses and such, instead of concentrating on the various types of gangs: clan warriors from the spires, brat 'poseurs' from the upper levels which went 'down' to experience the thrills of lowlife, undercity mutants, diseased scavengers from the toxic wastes and the Adeptus Arbites ever-ready to deal swift and summary "Judge Dredd"-like justice.

The miniatures released for this game were designed by John Blanche. The game background also included some elements later re-used in Necromunda, such as the 'spook' psychic drug, and some which were disregarded, such as the 'caryatids', largely unexplained blue-skinned cherubs which were presented as unique and integral to Necromundan life. Rick Priestley dropped some of Laserburn's elements for a "cowboys in space" setting.

Compared to Necromunda, Confrontation had a more complex system for resolving combat, particularly firing—portions of which were similar in style to Laserburn, a miniatures game by Bryan Ansell that had influenced Warhammer 40,000. Jervis Johnson adapted the campaign system he had written for Blood Bowl for Necromunda.

The original plan was for Necromunda to be a "secondary game system" produced for a couple of years with a single supplement and then retired. The interest and demand for the game was greater than expected but GW did not have the resources to develop and produce for the game with the result that Games Workshop created a division called Fanatic to look after the Specialist Games range, including Necromunda.

In 2003, Games Workshop released a new 148-page gaming sourcebook titled Necromunda Underhive.

As Necromunda continued to flourish, various characters and "hangers-on" whose entries and stats are available in the various Necromunda publications have had models released under Games Workshop's Forge World imprint. Models for Necromunda that are for sale at Forge World range from unnamed "hive scum" and "dome runners" and other no-names who make a living serving the various gangs of Necromunda; to various characters and "specialty" models, such as the Mercator Slavers Guild, Kal Jericho, and Scabbs, and the Orlock Road Warrior Slade Merdena and his Cyber Mastiff, Macula amongst many others.

=== 2017 relaunch ===
Necromunda: Underhive
Brutal gang warfare in the 41st Millenium
- Designers: Andy Hoare
- Publishers: Games Workshop (Specialist Games)
- Years active: 2017 onwards
- Players: 2–4
- Playing time: 60 minutes
- Chance: High (dice rolling)
- Age range: 12+

On 13 August 2017, Games Workshop announced that a new edition of the game was in development. The new version, titled Necromunda: Underhive was released on 24 November 2017 with gangs Escher and Goliath. More gangs followed in 2018, and now all six major houses are represented. In addition, a range of characters is also available. In March 2019, the Ambot kit was released, giving players the chance to field powerful close combat 'androids' for the first time.

Since the release of the core Underhive release, the game has seen strong reception which has led to continued support for the game. 2018 saw the release of quarterly supplements, referred to as "Gang War", volumes I - IV (Goliaths and Eschers; Orlock; Van Saar; Cawdor), each one covering a different gang in-depth, as well as expanding trading post options and providing new mission and campaign supplements. In the December 2018 White Dwarf, a fifth insert supplement was added to cover off the last core gang, Delaque.

In 2019, a revised version of the Core Rules, as well as an updated consolidation of all the gang war content, was published under a single title Gangs of the Underhive. Throughout 2019, Games Workshop continued providing additional supplementation for the game through books that explored additional options, each one including additional gang options, additional Dramatis Personae/Bounty Hunters, and additional campaign options:

- Book of Judgment - Includes new campaign supplements as well as rules for Palanite Enforcers, The Law enforcement arm of Necromunda
- Book of Peril - Includes the Venator Gang rules, new campaign supplements, rules for Psychers/Spykers, and additional Bounty Hunters such as Kal Jericho and Scabbs.
- Book of Ruin - Includes rules for Corpse Grinders, Chaos Helots, and Genestealers. It also covers more campaign content as well as rules for models tainted with Chaos.

In addition to these campaigns and support supplements, Games Workshop would release a second two-player starter box for the game called Necromunda: Dark Uprising. The box set saw an ambitious start package for new players which included models for the Palanite Enforcers and Subjugators squaring off against the Corpse Grinder Cult. The starter would also be the first to include a comprehensive 3D plastic terrain kit that allowed players to explore the three-dimensional playscape the game has to offer by including elements such as elevators and stairs. The kit also came with a new "Dark Uprising" campaign book. Much of the contents for the Corpse Grinders and Palanite Enforcers/Subjugators in the campaign module mirrors the content published in "The Book of Ruin" and "The Book of Judgment" published earlier in 2019, but also offered the players a unique campaign that was only available in the box set.

The 2020 release for Necromunda began focusing on expansions for the previously established "Core Gangs", with a planned release for each gang. These books include an extensive history of the gang, including relationships with the various guilds of Necromunda as well as relationships with the higher "noble houses" of Necromunda. In addition to the new books, each book would see releases on both the Games Workshop line and the Forgeworld line to allow players to use models specifically made for the new material in the book.

These books were expected to adhere to a quarterly release, but complications stemming from the global COVID-19 pandemic delayed the development of these volumes. Prior to COVID-19, Games Workshop was able to get the first volume, "House of Chains" into circulation before halting the production of subsequent books. In June 2020, Games Workshop announces that they were restarting the production and development of these books. Below are the currently released books, as well as any further announced ones:

- House of Artifice - Focuses on House Van Saar
- House of Blades - Focuses on House Escher
- House of Chains - Focuses on House Goliath, also includes a new playable gang, the Ogryn Slave gang
- House of Faith - Focuses on House Cawdor
- House of Iron - Focuses on House Orlock
- House of Shadow - Focuses on House Delaque

To further supplement the existing models and rules, Book of the Outcast was launched in December 2021, alongside the requisite Tactics cards and models. The book contained a more robust "Psychic Ruleset" as well as a more Dramatis Personae and additional minor subgroups of other gangs.

Continuing Releases

Ash Wastes

After releasing supplements for all of the core houses as well as the book of Outcasts, Games Workshop began publishing content that took players beyond the walls of Hive Primus. Taking players into the Ash wastes outside of the walls of Hive Primus, this backdrop was explored in both a new Box set referred to as "the Ash Wastes" as well as the release of the Book of the Outlands. The Book of the Outlands provided players with the official release for the Ash Wastelanders gang as well as rules for both newly released vehicles for navigating the wastes for each gang, but also rules to make your own, whether they be made of kitbashsed materials from other existing kits; or of household components at the discretion of the builder/player. In addition to these details, it also provided players for the "Iron Squat Prospectors" gang, a group of space dwarfs or "Squats" which bridged with the release of the Leagues of Votann army for Warhammer 40,000 which had come out earlier in the same year.

The Aranthian Cycle and Core Rules Refit

The Aranthian Cycle, released throughout 2023 was Games Workshop's first attempt at a large scale campaign. Spanning three books released at different points throughout the year, the Aranthian Cycle focused on the attempted murder of Lord Helmawyr, and the chaos that ensued after. The saga is covered over the course of three titles, each one serving as an "act" in the larger story and including threads for players to follow to accommodate a major narrative event within the world. The Books in the series, in order are "Cinderak Burns", "The Vaults of Temenos" and "Ruins of Jardlan". Major plot points include the assassination attempt on Lord Helmawr, the High lord of Necromunda, as well as the arrival of key characters, including several of Helmawr's children. In addition to this three-volume campaign, a new core rulebook was released which aimed at amending rules disparities captured in the first Core rules book from 2019, as well as consolidating it with key components captured in the "Gangs of the Underhive" book that was not necessarily captured in the release of the individual gang books.

Hive Secundus

In 2024, Games Workshop took us to the ruins of Hive Secundus, a hive that was once known as a hub of scholarship and accelerated scientific progress. What remains now is a still-smoking ruin after Lord Helmawr ordered it to be razed to the ground and below due to the result of one genesmith tinkering with genestealer DNA which led to a genestealer incursion. As the story goes, the resources and treasures still present in the ruin have attracted the attentions of Spyre hunters, as well as the last remaining heir to the Helmawr dynasty. However, parts of the underhive of secundus remains intact, and the strains of genestealer DNA that survived have been left to evolve and mutate into what is now known as the Malstrain Genestealers, a horrific hybrid of proto-human DNA fused with that of the genestealers.

2025 and Onwards

Necromunda continues to see material released, largely in the form of updates. Examples of this include Bastions Of Law which serves as an update to the rules for Palanite Enforcers. In 2026 a new consolidated edition of the game was launched under the name Warhammer Necromunda Skirmish.

== Reception ==
Mark Donald reviewed Necromunda for Arcane magazine, rating it an 8 out of 10 overall. Donald comments that "It's a spawn of the Warhammer 40,000 universe and the family resemblance is marked, but this time there's a rumble in the concrete jungle. And fortunately, you're in the thick of it."

In Issue 91 of the French games magazine Casus Belli, Croc noted, "Necromunda is a great success, allowing several players to have a fantastic time, and — quite rare for Games Workshop, it's worth noting — without spending exorbitant amounts of money." Croc concluded, "The characters' experience and the variety of scenarios allow for very diverse confrontations, and there's always something unexpected happening. Perhaps not as accessible as Blood Bowl, but Necromunda has plenty to offer."

In the Summer 2022 issue of Irregular, Jason Hubbard reviewed the box of plastic miniatures titled "Hive Scum" that Games Workshop sold as an accessory to this game. Hubbard was pleased with the workmanship, commenting, "As usual for Games Workshop these are well sculpted ... The great thing about this is that it will work for a number of games besides Necromunda.

== Cancelled RPG ==
In 2026, Necromunda was relaunched as Warhammer Necromunda Skirmish with an announcement made for Warhammer Necromunda Roleplay on September 18th. On October 23rd, a follow up article was published announcing that the game had been shelved.

== Video games ==
Necromunda: Underhive Wars is a tactical role-playing game with the player controlling a gang of up to 5 members. It launched for PC, Xbox One and the PlayStation 4 on 7 September 2020.

Necromunda: Hired Gun is a first-person shooter set on Necromunda. It released on 31 May 2021 for PS4, PS5, Xbox One, Xbox Series, and PC Windows.

Necromunda: Gang Skirmish is a strategy game. It was released in 2021 for iOS and Android devices by Legendary Games.

== Bibliography ==
- Priestley, Rick; Chambers, Andy; Johnson, Jervis (1995). Necromunda - Rulebook (1st ed.). Nottingham: Games Workshop Ltd. ISBN 1-872372-48-1.
- Priestley, Rick; Chambers, Andy; Johnson, Jervis (1995). Necromunda - Sourcebook (1st ed.). Nottingham: Games Workshop Ltd. ISBN 1-872372-48-1.
- "Jervis Johnson and Rick Priestley on Necromunda". Filmdeg Miniatures. 2024 – via YouTube.
