= Mordheim =

Board game

- Cover of the Mordheim rulebook
- Publishers: Games Workshop
- Players: 2 or more
- Setup time: 10 minutes
- Playing time: 45 minutes - 1.5 hours
- Chance: High
- Skills: Strategy, Arithmetic

Mordheim is a tabletop game published by Games Workshop in 1999. It is a variant of the company's Warhammer Fantasy game set on a warband or "skirmish" scale. Mordheim was designed by Alessio Cavatore, Tuomas Pirinen, and Rick Priestley. Alongside the basic skirmish game, Mordheim also features a campaign system, where Warbands gain experience and equipment as the campaign progresses, in a similar nature to role-playing games.

The game is set during a civil war in the Empire from Imperial Year 1999, some 500 years before the present day in the Warhammer Fantasy timeline. When a comet struck and destroyed the city of Mordheim, a material called wyrdstone was scattered throughout the ruins. Mercenary warbands from all over the Warhammer world battle with one another for the wyrdstone.

== Warbands ==
The official rulebook, which was released in 1999, introduced several warbands which players are able to use. These included human mercenaries from the Empire provinces of Reikland, Middenheim, and Marienburg, cult of the possessed, witch hunters, the sisters of Sigmar, the undead, and skaven.

A Mordheim Annual was released in 2002, increasing the number of officially available warbands. The expanded set of warbands introduced orcs and goblins, dwarf treasure hunters, human mercenaries from the Empire province of Ostland and Averland, high elves, and Kislev.

== Computer game adaptation ==
A computer-based adaptation of the game titled Mordheim: City of the Damned was released for personal computers in November 2015 and for consoles in October 2016.

There also exists a mobile game titled Mordheim: Warband Skirmish by Legendary Games.
