= Streum On Studio =

French video game developer

- Industry: Video games
- Founded: 2007
- Headquarters: Paris, France
- Key people: Jonathan Cacherat; Pierrick Le Nestour; Christophe Longuépée
- Products: E.Y.E.: Divine Cybermancy; Space Hulk: Deathwing; Necromunda: Hired Gun
- Parent: Focus Entertainment (2021–2024)
- Website: www.streumon-studio.com

Streum On Studio is a French video game development company based in Paris. Founded in 2007, the studio is best known for developing E.Y.E.: Divine Cybermancy, Space Hulk: Deathwing, and Necromunda: Hired Gun.

== History ==
Streum On Studio was founded in 2007 by Jonathan Cacherat, Pierrick Le Nestour, and Christophe Longuépée. Prior to starting the company, the team had worked on a mod for Half-Life named "Syndicate Black Ops". According to Longuépée, the word "streum on" means monster in Verlan. The studio then began working on their first project titled E.Y.E.: Divine Cybermancy with a team of about 10 people. The company then partnered with Games Workshop and Focus Home Interactive to release Space Hulk: Deathwing. The studio was acquired by Focus Home Interactive in April 2021 and became Focus Home's second in-house game development studio after Deck13 Interactive. The studio continued its collaboration with Games Workshop and released Necromunda: Hired Gun in June 2021.

In June 2025, Streum On Studio bought their shares back from Focus Home Interactive and became independent again. The announcement was made on their social media accounts with a teaser for their next game, which was later revealed to be Daimon Blade—a prequel to their first official video game E.Y.E.: Divine Cybermancy.

== Games ==
Year	Title	Platform(s)
2011	E.Y.E.: Divine Cybermancy	Windows
2016	Space Hulk: Deathwing	Windows, PlayStation 4
2021	Necromunda: Hired Gun	Windows, PlayStation 4, PlayStation 5, Xbox One, Xbox Series X/S
2025	Daimon Blades	Windows
