= Warhammer 40,000: Freeblade =

2015 video game

- Developer: Pixel Toys
- Platforms: iOS, Android, Windows, Apple TV
- Release: NA: November 19, 2015
- Genre: Shooter

Warhammer 40,000: Freeblade is a rail shooter game for iOS and Android mobile devices, and Windows. It is one of the first games to utilize Apple's 3D Touch

Apple has used Freeblade to highlight the capabilities of its new devices, first showcasing the game during an iPhone 6S event in September 2015 as a demonstration of the phone's A9 chip performance. During the demo of the iPhone 8 and iOS 11 at WWDC, Apple used the game to demonstrate the iOS 11's ARKit capabilities. The game was also ported to a Windows 10 version.

== Gameplay ==
Warhammer 40,000: Freeblade is a shooter game that takes place in the Warhammer 40,000 universe, putting the player in control of an Imperial Knight, a giant mech piloted by a single pilot. Touch controls allow the player to shoot various weapons at hordes of enemies that appear on screen.

== Synopsis ==
On the Imperial World of Tarnis, Fort Drakkus, the keep of House Drakkus (a royal house that provides Imperial Knights) is attacked by Chaos Space Marines. A lone Imperial Knight, Vortigan (the player's default name, although this can be customized) completes his knighting procedure during the attack and is directed by Lucius, the Sacristan, to link up with his fellow Imperial Knights. However, in the fighting Vortigan is forced to watch as Chaos forces kill his brothers and uncle (all Imperial Knights) and Fort Drakkus and House Drakkus both fall, before he is saved by a detachment of the Dark Angels Space Marine chapter. As a Knight now without a House, he is now a mercenary-for-hire known thereafter as a Freeblade.

Taken to the Fist of Caliban, the Space Marines' strike cruiser that serves as the detachment's headquarters, Vortigan decides to serve the Dark Angels. He is first tasked to take back several cities and strategic from an Ork invasion, including a communications array. As Vortigan assaults an Ork-controlled city, it is revealed that Chaos forces have made further attacks on the planet, prompting Vortigan to assault the city (which the Chaos forces have taken back) before he is rebuked and ordered to take a vital AA installation, which he does so.

Later, Vortigan assaults a fort captured by the Orks where he forces the commander of the Orks, Nekkruncha, to flee. He is then contacted by a mysterious figure, who orders Vortigan and the Dark Angels to a contested city which the Chaos have been desperately trying to take. The city is revealed to house a fragment of a Chaos starship that crashed in a nearby forest, which Vortigan investigates. After fighting off Chaos illusions and forces, Vortigan meets the mysterious figure: the Iron Warden of Tarnis, Altorus.

Altorus reveals that the Chaos have arrived in order to obtain eight marks of the Chaos god Khorne to summon Felfurion, a Greater Daemon (an immensely powerful Chaos being that is an incarnation of a chaos god and is capable of killing billions before it can be stopped) of Khorne, of which multiple marks have been obtained already. Before this however, Vortigan and Altorus are forced to take another Ork city to destroy a series of teleporters the Orks have been using to defeat the Imperial forces on planet. Afterwards, Altorus departs to stop Felfurion's summoning as Vortigan hunts down and kills Nekkruncha, ending the Ork threat.

Shortly afterwards, Vortigan receives a message that Altorus is at Fort Drakkus, having found the abandoned fort to be the location of Felfurion's summoning, and that the Chaos is led by Zufiel, a former Dark Angel who now serves Khorne. Fighting through the ruins of Fort Drakkus, Vortigan and the Dark Angels encounter a dying Altorus, who reveals himself as a former House Drakkus member. Finally, Vortigan and the Dark Angels reach Zufiel and try to kill him, but he sacrifices himself to complete the ritual, summoning Felfurion. Vortigan is forced to combat the Greater Daemon and eventually banishes it back to the Warp, afterwards becoming the new Iron Warden of Tarnis.

== Reception ==
Reception

Aggregate score
Aggregator	Score
Metacritic	69/100

Review score
Publication	Score
TouchArcade	3/5

Warhammer 40,000: Freeblade received "mixed or average" reviews from critics, according to review aggregator website Metacritic.
