= Apocalypse: The Game of Nuclear Devastation =

Board game

Cover art by Tony Roberts

Apocalypse: The Game of Nuclear Devastation is a board game of nuclear war released by Games Workshop in 1980. It is based on The Warlord, a game designed and self-published by Mike Hayes in 1974.

== Description ==
Apocalypse is a game of conquest for 2–4 players similar to Risk, albeit with nuclear weapons. The game map covers Western Europe. Players vie to conquer the entire map, the last one standing being declared the winner.

=== Setup ===
All city areas are distributed to the players at random. A player is chosen to go first. (The rules suggest this should be the most inexperienced player, since going first is advantageous. Reviewer John Lambshead suggested it was so advantageous to go first that players should roll dice every turn to decide this.)

=== Components ===
The game box contains:

- Two-part mounted map of Western Europe
- 140 blank counters in four colours
- 140 radiation counters
- plastic multipart nuclear missiles
- rules sheet

=== Gameplay ===
A turn uses the following sequence: fire missiles, build armies, move, attack.

==== Build armies ====
During the "build armies" phase, each city can produce one new army unit, but two linked suburban areas are needed to produce an army. Unpopulated areas do not produce any armies. Built armies can be placed in any area that can be linked back to where they were built.

==== Movement ====
As with Risk, a stack of armies can only move from one area into an empty area, leaving one unit behind to occupy the initial area.

==== Combat ====
To resolve combat, the attacking player chooses a number between 1 and the total number of possible attacking units from one area (up to a maximum of six). The attacking player then turns a die to this number and conceals it under a cup. The defending player tries to guess the number under the cup. If the defender is correct, the attacker loses that number of units. If the defender guesses wrong, the defender loses an army from the area being attacked. If this results in an empty area, the attacker must move the number of units that had been indicated on the concealed die into the area.

Terrain has an effect on combat: a player attacking a mountain area may only use the numbers 1, 2 or 3. A player defending a sea area gets two guesses.

==== Fire missiles ====
Whenever a successful attack is made, the attacker gets a missile, which can be placed in any area linked to the one from which the attack was made. If there is already a rocket there, the second rocket may be added to the first to make a two-stage rocket. There is no limit to how large a rocket can be. The rocket's range is dependent on the number of stages, so a one-stage rocket can hit all adjacent areas, a two-stage rocket can hit any areas two away, and so on.

When a rocket hits an area, it destroys all armies in the area and renders it radioactive, making it impassable to all armies. In addition, armies in all the adjacent areas are also removed from the board, and any missiles in those areas go off. This may lead to a chain reaction as nuclear explosions detonate missiles in adjacent areas, which then detonate further missiles.

If there is a missile in an area that is successfully occupied, then the occupier is now the new owner of the missile.

Areas that are irradiated can be cleaned up as long as the reclaiming player takes no other actions that turn.

=== Victory conditions ===
Play continues until there is only one player left. If all armies are eliminated by a nuclear chain reaction, the game ends in a stalemate.

== Publication history ==
In 1974, Mike Hayes, a student at University of Sheffield, self-published a game of nuclear war in Europe for 2–7 players packaged in a plain red box titled The Warlord. Hayes republished the game in 1978 in a blue box.

In 1980, Games Workshop acquired the rights from Hayes and revised the game, simplifying the rules, reducing the number of players to 4, removing hydrogen bombs, allowing irradiated areas to be cleaned up, and cutting the board map in half (eliminating Eastern Europe). This revised game was released as Apocalypse: The Game of Nuclear Devastation with cover art by Tony Roberts. (The cover art had been used three years previously on the cover of the Orbit/Futura paperback edition of Jerry Pournelle's science fiction novel The Mercenary.)

After Apocalypse went out of print, Mike Hayes reacquired the rights and republished his full original game, retitled Classic Warlord, in 2012.

== Computer game ==
A computer game version, Apocalypse: The Game of Nuclear Devastation, was published by Red Shift under license from Games Workshop in 1983 for the ZX Spectrum and BBC Micro.

== Reception ==
David Ladyman reviewed Apocalypse in The Space Gamer No. 39. Ladyman commented that "The graphics and component design are up to Games Workshop's usual high standard. The rules are short and clear. I would consider recommending Apocalypse if an equivalent game wasn't on the market at a cheaper price. Risk, as I said above, is very similar".

John Olsen reviewed Apocalypse for White Dwarf #26, giving it an overall rating of 9 out of 10, and stated that "Apocalypse is a superb game and I would award it a 10 unhesitatingly, except that many games take a long time to finish."

In Issue 33 of Phoenix, John Lambshead was impressed by the dramatic box cover art by Tony Roberts. He also gave "full marks to whoever wrote the rules. They are simple but comprehensive and written in the English language." He found the game didn't work well with 2 players, but thought it came into its own with 4 players. He concluded with a good recommendation, saying, "An attractive package for anyone wanting a multi-player game which is far from mindless but which has rules that can be explained in minutes."

== Other reviews ==
- Casus Belli (Issue 16 - Aug 1983)
