= Warhammer 40,000: Space Wolf =

2014 video game

- Developer: HeroCraft
- Publisher: HeroCraft
- Composer: Cris Velasco
- Series: Warhammer 40,000
- Platforms: iOS; Android; Microsoft Windows; PlayStation 4; Nintendo Switch; Xbox One
- Release: iOS; October 28, 2014; Android; July 16, 2015; Windows; February 17, 2017; PlayStation 4: NA: March 26, 2019; EU: March 29, 2019; Nintendo Switch; January 23, 2020; Xbox One; June 30, 2021
- Genre: Turn-based strategy
- Modes: Single-player, multiplayer

Warhammer 40,000: Space Wolf is a free-to-play, squad-based strategy card game, developed and published by HeroCraft. The game is licensed by Games Workshop. The game was released on October 28, 2014, on iOS and on Android on July 16, 2015, and on Microsoft Windows via Steam on February 17, 2017. The PlayStation 4 version was released in March 2019 in North America and Europe, and on Nintendo Switch on January 23, 2020. It was later released for Xbox One on June 30, 2021.

== Gameplay ==
Warhammer 40,000: Space Wolf is a turn-based collectible card game in which players will take the role of Space Marines of the Space Wolves Chapter. A card-based system is used to control the main characters’ combat actions and movements. Player's equipment, powers and skills are also represented by cards. Cards vary in rarity and maximum level (how many times players can upgrade the card). Cards can be levelled by combining two cards of the same type. Players can create their own decks, picking the cards that fit their gameplay style and needs.

== Development ==
The game was announced in August 2013 with a free-to-play business model. In September 2014, HeroCraft soft-launched the game in South Africa, before the game finally released worldwide on October 28, 2014, for iOS. In April 2015, the game received an update that introduced a 3v3 multiplayer mode. On July 16, 2015, the Android version was released. In June 2016 an update was released with a PvE survival mode. In May 2017, a major DLC was launched called the Saga of the Great Awakening which brought ten new missions to the campaign fighting the Necrons, was added. In March 2018 a new DLC called Fall of Kanak was released which saw the player take control of the forces of Chaos though the playable character Pollux the Flayer, Champion of Khorne. These missions acted as a prequel dealing with the initial Chaos invasion of Kanak.

For the release on PC, the business model was changed to a one-time purchase. On 16 February 2017, the game was released early access on the Steam distribution platform. Early access ended on 21 September, and since then Space Wolf has been considered the full version.

In September 2023 it was announced selling the game on Steam would cease in October.

== Plot ==
=== Original Game ===
The Imperium sends the Space Marines of the Space Wolves Chapter to the planet Kanak which is under invasion from the forces of Chaos. As the ship carrying the Space Wolves exits the Warp near the planet it is attacked and destroyed by a Chaos ship. The wreckage falls to the planets surface with only a few Space Wolves surviving the crash. Valgard Twice-Slain, a squad commander and the playable character, regroups the surviving Space Wolves who are being hunted by Chaos Space Marines from the Word Bearers chapter, led by Dark Apostle Oriax the Persuader. The Space Wolves fight the Word Bearers despite being outnumbered and discover Oriax in an alien temple performing a ritual to awaken a Keeper of Secrets, a Great Daemon of the Chaos God Slaneesh. Oriax is defeated.

=== Saga of the Great Awakening DLC ===
Oriax was defeated but his ritual has now awoken the Necrons, the builders of the temple, who now emerge and attack both the Space Wolves and the Word Bearers.Valgard and his Space Wolves fight their way out of the temple and realising they are heavily outnumbered decide to focus on destroying the new Necron threat. However, Valgard soon learns that Chaos Sorcerer Zymeltros Frell is finishing the ritual to awaken the daemon and Valgard attempts to stop him. The Space Wolves arrive too late and the daemon possesses Frells' body. Valgard manages to defeat the Keeper of Secrets and banishes it. With the Chaos forces dealt with Valgard begins attacking the Necron forces. The Space Wolves eventually find the enemy Lord and manage to defeat him in combat but before they can kill him he escapes through a "Dolmen Gate" which acts as a teleporter. Valgard pursues the Necron Lord through the gate which closes behind him.

=== Fall of Kanak DLC ===
In this prequel to the original campaign the player controls the forces of Chaos and playable character Pollux the Flayer, Champion of Khorne. The Word Bearers invade Kanak and Oriax tasks Pollux with claiming 100 souls for Khorne. Pollux does battle with the Kanak Skull Takers who are the planetary Imperial Guard regiment. Chaos Sorcerer Zymeltros Frell, aids Pollux despite Pollux's open disdain for the sorcerer. Once Pollux has claimed enough souls, Frell reveals that the souls were claimed not for Khorne but for Slaanesh and were to be used to perform the ritual to awaken the daemon. Frell abandons Pollux who is greatly outnumbered by the Imperial Guard but Pollux manages to fight his way free.

== Reception ==
Reception

Aggregate score
Aggregator	Score
Metacritic	69 (5 reviews)

Review scores
Publication	Score
Pocket Gamer	4/5
TouchArcade	3/5

Warhammer 40,000: Space Wolf received mixed reviews on mobile.
