= Mordheim: Warband Skirmish =

Strategy role-playing video game

- Developer: Legendary Games
- Platforms: Android; iOS; Amazon; Nintendo Switch
- Release: May 25, 2017; Nintendo Switch; November 26, 2018
- Genre: Tactical role-playing
- Mode: Single-player

Mordheim: Warband Skirmish is a multiplayer mobile device strategy role-playing game developed by British studio Legendary Games for Android, iOS and Amazon. It was released on May 25, 2017. The game is based on Games Workshop’s 1999 tabletop game Mordheim.

It is an adaptation of Games Workshop’s table-top game Mordheim. Set in the Warhammer world during a time of civil strife you lead your Warband through several different encounters, collecting magic shards from the comet that destroyed the city of Mordheim. Currently in the game the warbands that available to play are the Reikland Mercenaries, Middenheim Mercenaries, Marienburg Mercenaries, Skaven and the Undead.

On November 26, 2018, a version of the game was released for Nintendo Switch.

== Reception ==
Reception

Review scores
Publication	Score
Pocket Gamer	6/10
Digitally Downloaded	2.5/5

The game was nominated for Amazon Appstore game and for Strategy Game of the year in the Tiga awards. It was also nominated by Game Connect for the Most Promising IP
