= Warhammer 40,000: Mechanicus II =

2026 video game

- Developer: Bulwark Studios
- Publisher: Kasedo Games
- Composer: Guillaume David
- Series: Warhammer 40,000
- Platforms: PlayStation 5; Windows; Xbox Series X/S
- Release: 21 May 2026
- Genre: Turn-based tactics
- Mode: Single-player

Warhammer 40,000: Mechanicus II is a 2026 turn-based tactics video game developed by Bulwark Studios and published by Kasedo Games. It is a sequel to the 2018 game, Warhammer 40,000: Mechanicus, and was announced in May 2024. The game was released on 21 May 2026.

== Gameplay ==
Warhammer 40,000: Mechanicus II gives the player a choice to play as one of two factions, the Necrons, and the Adeptus Mechanicus. The game uses turn-based strategy mechanics.

== Release ==
Warhammer 40,000: Mechanicus II was developed by Bulwark Studios. A gameplay trailer for the game was posted on 22 May 2025. On 2 October 2025 a demo was released on Steam. The game was released on 21 May 2026 for Windows, PlayStation 5, and Xbox Series X/S.

== Reception ==
Reception

Aggregate scores
Aggregator	Score
Metacritic	(PC) 71/100
OpenCritic	50% recommend

The PC version of Warhammer 40,000: Mechanicus II received "mixed or average" reviews from critics, according to the review aggregation website Metacritic. Fellow review aggregator OpenCritic assessed that the game received fair approval, being recommended by 50% of critics.
