= Warhammer 40,000: Dark Nexus Arena =

- Developer: Whitebox Interactive
- Publisher: Whitebox Interactive
- Composer: Jeff van Dyck
- Engine: Unity
- Platform: Microsoft Windows
- Release: Cancelled
- Genres: Multiplayer online battle arena, twin-stick shooter
- Mode: Multiplayer

Warhammer 40,000: Dark Nexus Arena is a cancelled multiplayer online battle arena, twin-stick shooter video game developed and published by Canadian independent developer Whitebox Interactive, for Microsoft Windows. The game takes place in the Warhammer 40,000 universe, created by Games Workshop. The game combines traditional twin-stick shooting with four-versus-four team deathmatch mechanics.

In Warhammer 40,000: Dark Nexus Arena, players take control of a "Veteran" taken from the tabletop universe of Warhammer 40,000 and pitted against other alien races in the Dark Eldar Wych Cult Arenas of Commoragh.

The game launched into early access on May 1, 2015 and was set to launch in 2016. However, development has since ceased on the project, and servers were shut down March 12, 2016.

== Gameplay ==
The game took place in the Wych Cult Arenas of the Dark Eldar. Players assumed control of one of the various Veterans who had been captured and thrown into the gladiatorial pits to fight for survival. The gameplay combined WASD movement controls with skill-shot based attacks from the twin-stick shooter genre.

Warhammer 40,000: Dark Nexus Arena was a 3D, third-person multiplayer online battle arena (MOBA) game. The game was a team deathmatch where the players battled for kills and executions to gain points.

The playable factions during Early Access included the Imperium, Tau, Orks, and Chaos Space Marines.
