= Space Hulk: Deathwing =

2016 video game

- Cover art for the Enhanced Edition
- Developer: Streum On Studio
- Publisher: Focus Home Interactive
- Directors: Pierrick Le Nestour; Jonathan Cacherat
- Designers: Jonathan Cacherat; Dimitri Dru
- Programmer: Jonathan Cacherat
- Artists: Aurélien Hubert; Benoit Gomet
- Writer: Jonathan Cacherat
- Composers: Doyle W. Donehoo; Jonathan Cacherat
- Series: Warhammer 40,000
- Engine: Unreal Engine 4
- Platforms: Windows, PlayStation 4
- Release: Windows; December 14, 2016; PlayStation 4 March 28, 2018
- Genre: First-person shooter
- Modes: Single-player, multiplayer

Space Hulk: Deathwing is a first-person shooter developed by Streum On Studio with assistance from Cyanide and published by Focus Home Interactive. The game is set in the Warhammer 40,000 universe and based upon the turn-based strategy tabletop miniatures board game Space Hulk. It expands the gameplay environment, beyond the narrow maze-like corridors of the original board game and earlier video games, to include massive space ship interiors such as a cathedral. The story is co-written by Gav Thorpe, a longtime Games Workshop author and games designer. The game was released on December 14, 2016, while the console version was released on March 28, 2018.

== Premise ==
In Space Hulk: Deathwing's single-player campaign, the player is a Librarian of the Dark Angels 1st company of Space Marines. The Dark Angels' Deathwing company is unique amongst the rest of their Chapters' companies in being composed of only Terminators. First company veterans in each Space Marine Chapter have earned the right to don the sacred Tactical Dreadnought Armor or Terminator Armor, which provides more powerful weapons and tougher protection than the standard Power Armour donned by most Marines.

Like the Space Hulk series, the main antagonists are Genestealers, an aggressive alien species (similar to the xenomorphs depicted in the Alien franchise) which have made their home aboard a massive derelict space-faring vessel called a Space Hulk, threatening the "Deathwing's" search for artifacts as they try to transform the Space Hulk into their nest. The Genestealers are a part of the overall Tyranid aliens where they serve as the shock troops, although their origins are not related to any other Tyranid broods. The Genestealers also form an infiltration force known as a Genestealer Cult that weakens a target planet, by infecting the local population and causing civil unrest, in advance of the arrival of the main Tyranid Hive Fleet invasion.

== Reception ==
Reception

Aggregate score
| Aggregator | Score |
|---|---|
| Metacritic | PC: 58/100; PS4: 55/100 |

Review scores
| Publication | Score |
|---|---|
| GameSpot | 4/10 |
| IGN | 6.4/10 |
| PC Gamer (UK) | 60/100 |

Critical reception for the PC version has been mixed, holding a score of 58 on Metacritic. Reviewers have criticised the game for numerous bugs, a lack of polish and optimization, clunky menus, poor AI, and a lackluster story.

TJ Hafer, reviewing the game for IGN, said that "The glorious moments of fervent xeno-purging are too fleeting, and often left me standing in dark corridors, surrounded by my slain foes, looking for any kind of context or sense of lasting accomplishment . . . [Despite] a lot of potential for simple, squad-based fun in multiplayer, it never moves beyond being a stripped-down and poorly running prototype for the kind of game I wish it had been." GameSpot's Brett Todd especially criticised the game's AI and menus, noting that "For every impressive set piece and “wow” moment in combat, there are a dozen befuddling rules or mechanics that make you scratch your head in disbelief. . . AI Space Marines are prone to shuffling in place, turning their backs on attacking enemies right in their faces, and standing in the middle of doorways when you're trying to seal off a room full of aliens . . . [They] don't do anything on their own, either. You have to tell your apothecary marine to patch himself up when his health is low—otherwise he just lets himself die. A radial order menu allows you to give rudimentary commands like Follow, Defend, and Heal, but it's impossibly clunky to use during combat unless your Deathwing trooper has a deathwish."

Tom Mendelsohn of Ars Technica took the game to task for its dense, lore-heavy storyline, writing that "Sometimes you stomp through duct systems and cramped reactor cores, and sometimes you let rip in massive stone cathedrals erected to the decrepit god-emperor of humanity . . . But all this atmosphere is nothing without context. The game dumps you in the thick of it, with a minimum of exposition. This isn't always a bad thing, but in Deathwing players are bombarded with references that must be absolutely baffling for anyone without a childhood spent poring through Games Workshop codices."

In contrast, the game's level design, atmosphere, and graphics have been positively received. Brett Todd noted that "Deathwing thankfully nails the look and atmosphere of the Warhammer 40,000 universe. It's loaded with visual fan service like massive cathedrals, dissected bodies in laboratories, and humans wired into power systems. Everything is just as baroque and bloody as it ought to be, making for one of the most authentic video game interpretations of Warhammer 40,000's striking aesthetic." Tom Mendelsohn similarly praised the atmosphere of the game, as well as its non-linear level design. The game's combat has also been mostly well received, with many reviews comparing it favorably to games such as Left 4 Dead and Killing Floor.

== Enhanced Edition ==
The console version was released with the subtitle Enhanced Edition, and aimed to deliver "full multiplayer progression system with loot and class customization; new multiplayer class (Interrogator-Chaplain); new weapon and skills (Return to Olethros Update); new enemies.". These updates aimed to address many issues players had with the initial release, which "include a frame rate that has been described as unacceptably low, stability issues causing players to be bombed out of a match, lengthy matchmaking times, lengthy loading times, and an unpolished UI."
