= Warhammer 40,000: Tacticus =

2022 video game

- Developer: Snowprint Studios
- Publisher: Snowprint Studios
- Writer: Matt Forbeck
- Series: Warhammer 40,000
- Platforms: iOS; Android
- Release: 15 August 2022
- Genre: Turn-based tactics
- Modes: Single-player, multiplayer

Warhammer 40,000: Tacticus is a turn-based tactics video game set in the Warhammer 40,000 universe, developed and published by Snowprint Studios. It was released for iOS and Android on 15 August 2022.

== Gameplay ==
Tacticus is a turn-based tactics game that implements gacha game mechanics. The player forms and controls parties of up to five units that fight on a hexagonal grid. Units are distinct and defined by movement, a basic attack, and an ability. Battles are short, and a substantial part of the gameplay consists of managing units between battles and unlocking upgrades for them.

The game contains a single-player campaign and a multiplayer arena mode.

== Development and release ==
Tacticus was developed by Swedish studio Snowprint Studios, a studio founded in 2015 that had previously released titles Rivengard and Legend of Solgard. According to game director Wilhelm Österberg, the game was intended to be accessible to those new to the Warhammer 40,000 IP, while also appealing to fans of the tabletop hobby.

The game was announced in September 2021 with the story being written by Matt Forbeck. Tacticus was launched for iOS and Android on 15 August 2022.

The game and studio were acquired by Modern Times Group in 2023.

== Reception ==
Reviewer Jason Moth called it the best of the Warhammer 40,000 mobile games. In another review, Will Quick for Pocket Gamer gave the game three and a half stars, praising the game's visuals, mechanics, and the presentation of the lore. Metro gave the game 6/10 describing the gameplay as repetitive. Tommaso Pugliese of Multiplayer.it praised the gameplay and breadth of content, while criticizing it for lacking the "depth of a traditional strategy game". Connor Christie of Pocket Tactics praised the level of detail of the game's art and animations, and said that the game would appeal to fans of the series. Wargamer called Tactics "slick" and compared it to Raid: Shadow Legends.

Tacticus won the 2022 Pocket Gamer Award for Mobile Game of the Year.
