= Apocalypse: The Game of Nuclear Devastation (video game) =

1983 video game

- Developer: Red Shift
- Publisher: Red Shift
- Platforms: ZX Spectrum, BBC Micro
- Release: WW: 29 March 1983

Apocalypse: The Game of Nuclear Devastation is a video game based on the board game Apocalypse: The Game of Nuclear Devastation by Games Workshop.

== Gameplay ==
Apocalypse includes nine ways for the player to attack, instead of six like in the board game; the player is also able to use ships in addition to armies and missiles.

== Publication history ==
The computer game version was published by Red Shift under license from Games Workshop. It was released in 1983 for the ZX Spectrum and BBC Micro. Apocalypse was the first Spectrum game from Red Shift, and David Kelly from Popular Computing Weekly described the board game as "ideal material for conversion to the computer".

== Reception ==
Computer Answers #84 stated that Apocalypse "is not a game of mindless destruction like so many others, but rather one of tactics and strategy". Tony Bridge reviewed Apocalypse for Micro Adventurer #7 (May 1984), and described it as "a game system which should keep anyone happy for many months". Angus Ryall for Crash #9 (October 1984), complimented Red Shift as their games Apocalypse and Rebelstar Raiders were at the time "still far and away the best strategy games for the Spectrum".

Russell Clarke reviewed Apocalypse for White Dwarf #54, and stated that "Apocalypse is a good rendition of the tried and tested boardgame with some improvements (you buy the nuke instead of miraculously receiving one when you win a battle) and a few problems (speed of operation being the most serious). The BBC version offers the best value, I feel, as it has better graphics and is faster although the two versions are basically the same game."

Philippa Irving reviewed Apocalypse for Crash #43 (August 1987), calling the game "an odd blend of realism and fantasy" although it "lacks atmosphere", but concluding that she would "recommend Apocalypse as a good buy to those who are certain they'll have someone else to play with".
