= Mordheim: City of the Damned =

Tactical role-playing video game

- Developer: Rogue Factor
- Publisher: Focus Home Interactive
- Series: Warhammer Fantasy
- Platforms: Microsoft Windows; Xbox One; PlayStation 4
- Release: Microsoft Windows; November 19, 2015; Xbox One, PlayStation 4; October 18, 2016
- Genre: Tactical role-playing game
- Mode: Multiplayer; single-player

Mordheim: City of the Damned is a tactical role-playing game video game developed by Rogue Factor, a branch of Cyanide, for Microsoft Windows and published by Focus Home Interactive on November 19, 2015. The game is based on Games Workshop's 1999 tabletop game Mordheim.

== Gameplay ==
Mordheim: City of the Damned is based on the Mordheim tabletop game, which is a skirmish-oriented derivative of the larger Warhammer Fantasy wargames. Accordingly, the video game gives the player in control of a small warband that battles against rival teams over resources such as wyrdstones around the twisting alleyways of Mordheim. At the start of the game, the player chooses a faction (Sisters of Sigmar, Mercenaries from the Empire, Skaven, or the Cult of the Possessed in the base game) and over the course of the game, is given to opportunity to improve their warband's strength by recruiting, leveling, improving and customizing a roster of warriors as well as their equipment. Losing battles can lead to permanent injuries or even death of the members of the player's warband, so the emphasis is on careful engagements and survival. In addition to a single-player campaign, players can take their warbands and challenge other players online.

== Release ==
Mordheim was released on Steam Early Access in November 2014, prior to its full release. The game was later ported to Xbox One and PlayStation 4, for which it was released on 18 October 2016.

Two expansions were later released, each adding a new faction: the Witch Hunters in June 2016 and the Undead in October. These expansions were also released as a part of the "Complete DLC Pack".

== Reception ==
Reception

Aggregate score
Aggregator	Score
Metacritic	PC: 74/100; PS4: 72/100

Review scores
Publication	Score
Jeuxvideo.com	16/20
Softpedia	8/10
IGN Italia	8.4/10
IGN Spain	6/10
Hardcore Gamer	3.5/5
GameStar	81/100
The Escapist	4/5

The game received mixed reviews, gaining an average score of 74/100 on Metacritic. Some reviewers praised the "pleasantly morbid" atmosphere and deep game mechanics as befitting the tabletop original, but the game AI, steep and unforgiving learning curve, and technical issues (particularly user interface and load times) were described as frustrating.

Rock, Paper, Shotgun was particularly critical of the "uninspiring", "unexciting" and "languid" combat, calling the game "dumb" and "flawed".
