= List of scale model sizes =

This is a list of scale model sizes, listing a variety of size ratios for scale models.

== Model scales ==
Ratio	Inches per foot	Millimetres per foot	Common use	Comments
<1:20000			Cartography; Sci-fi	Figures on the scale of humans begin to become indistinguishable or impractical smaller than about 1:20,000; almost exclusively used for maps save for some sci-fi miniatures at non-standardized sizes.
1:20000		0.015 mm	Sci-fi	Arii produced injection-molded kits in this scale of the Zentradi spacecraft from the science fiction anime series Macross.
1:6000		0.051 mm	Ship models	"Figurehead" line of warship miniatures, notable for the inclusion of a baseplate.
1:4800		0.064 mm	Sci-fi	This scale has been used for fictional spacecraft for the board game Star Cruiser, originally from Citadel Miniatures. A set of British and German WWII warships in this scale were produced by CnC for use in the North Cape tabletop game.
1:3900		0.078 mm	Sci-fi	Star Trek toys and miniatures are available in this scale.
1:3000		0.102 mm	Sci-fi; Ship models	Science fiction miniatures produced in this scale by Brigade Models for the board game Starmada and an established scale for Naval wargaming in Britain, e.g., NavWar.
1:2500		0.122 mm	Sci-fi; Wargaming (naval)	A European size for naval wargaming ship models. Also a popular scale for large fictional spacecraft used in gaming, (esp. Star Trek).
1:2400		0.127 mm	Wargaming (naval)	A British and American size for naval wargaming ship models. Some science fiction miniatures in this scale.
1:2000		0.152 mm	Wargaming (naval); Ship models	Valiant Enterprises produces its "Fighting Sail" line of "sailing men o'war" and related subjects in this scale. Scale used in Japan for plastic naval models, waterline and full hull.
1:1400				Die cast ship models (e.g. by Siku), Star Trek spaceships.
1:1250		0.244 mm	Ship models	The dominant European size for die-cast ship models, most comprehensive range.
1:1200	0.01	0.254 mm	Ship models	A British and American size for ship and harbour models. Airfix used to produce in this scale.
1:1000		0.305 mm		This is a scale used in Germany for pre-finished airliner models. Herpa and Hogan Wings produces several models in this scale. Bandai produces spacecraft models from Space Battleship Yamato 2199 Ares Games produces the Sails of Glory line in this scale. Common scale for architectural modelling.
1:900		≈0.333 mm	Wargaming	"2mm figure scale" is the smallest scale popularly used for miniature wargaming. Used to depict large-scale battlefields, or for gaming in tight spaces.
1:800		0.381 mm	Ship models	This is a scale used for some aircraft carrier models. This scale is also used for some pre-finished die cast airliner models.
1:720		0.423 mm	Ship models	This was a standard size for ship models produced by Revell and Italeri but they have moved from it.
1:700		0.435 mm	Ship models	This is the scale that most manufacturer chose to produce the largest series of waterline plastic model ships and submarines. Full hull models are popular in that scale as well.
1:600		0.508 mm	Ship models Wargaming	Popular for ships, especially liners and capital ships. This is the traditional scale for comparative drawings of ships, used by the Royal Navy as it is about one-tenth of a nautical mile to the foot. Warship models produced by Airfix. Schabak/Schuco also produces airliner models in this scale. Equivalent to "3mm figure scale" miniature wargaming. Used to depict large-scale battlefields, or for gaming in tight spaces. Used with historical, fantasy, and sci-fi settings. Sometimes referred to as "pico" scale.
1:570		0.535 mm	Ship models	This scale was used by Revell for some ship models because it was one-half the size of the standard scale for wargaming models used by the U.S. Army.
1:535	0.022	0.570 mm	Ship models	Scale used by Revell for USS Missouri ship. Sometimes called "box scale" because chosen to fit a box size.
1:500		0.610 mm	Architecture; Ship models Die-cast aircraft	This is a scale used by the military in World War II for ship models used for war games and naval recognition. Several Japanese companies such as Nichimo Co Ltd. and Fujimi Model produce plastic ship models in this scale. It is also used by European companies for pre-finished die-cast airliner models. Common scale for architectural modelling.
1:480		0.635 mm	Model railways (T)	T scale, using 3 mm gauge track to represent standard gauge railways.
1:450		0.677 mm	Model railways (T)	T scale, using 3 mm gauge track to represent 3 ft 6 in (1,067 mm) gauge railways. Hasegawa also produces plastic ship models in this scale.
1:432		0.706 mm		The scale used during World War II by the U.S. Navy for aircraft recognition.
1:426	0.028	0.715 mm		Scale used by Revell for USS Arizona, Pennsylvania, Norton Sound, and Pine Island ships. Sometimes called "box scale" because chosen to fit a box size.
1:400		0.762 mm	Die-cast aircraft Ship models	A European size for ship and submarine models and die cast aircraft, e.g. Heller products. Most commonly used with aircraft models, specifically die-cast commercial airliners, which can be produced by popular manufacturers (including, but not limited to, Aeroclassics, Gemini Jets, Phoenix Model, JC Wings, and NG Model).
1:360	0.033"	0.8467 mm	Wargaming	The scale used in AD&D Battlesystem rules. Derived from the used of 10 yards to 1 inch. Works well with 5mm miniatures where a 6' man equals 5.08 mm
1:350		0.871 mm	Ship models	Though assumed to be a Japanese size for ship models, its origin lies in the UK, with the release of the 1:350 Javelin and Tribal Destroyer kit in December 1945 in the FROG Penguin range. These are typically full-hull models that are substantially more detailed than 1:700 waterline models.
1:300		1.016 mm	Wargaming (military)	A scale closely associated with 1:285 scale. The smallest scale commonly used for micro armor. "6 mm figure scale" for miniature wargaming.
1:288		1.058 mm		A scale for aircraft and rockets.
1:285		1.069 mm	Wargaming (military)	Also known as "6 mm figure scale", the U.S. Army scale for sand-table wargames. The standard used in hobbyist miniature wargaming, where it is considered interchangeable with 1:300 scale. Commonly used for micro armor.
1:270		1.129 mm		Used by Fantasy Flight Games' Star Wars: X-Wing Miniatures Game for their small and large ships.
1:250		1.219 mm		Used by Heller for model ships. 1:250 scale is commonly used with aircraft models - usually rather large and fairly pricey models - such as jumbo jet scale models.
1:239		1.275 mm		Used by some model aircraft.
1:220		1.385 mm	Model railways (Z)	Same as Z gauge.
1:200	0.06 in	1.524 mm	Architecture; Ship models Die-cast aircraft	A scale used for high-end model aircraft and very detailed paper and plastic model ships. 9 mm figure scale. Many airlines distribute models in this scale for free as a means of advertising. Aeroplane model brands in this scale include Flight Miniatures, JC Wings 200, Wings of Glory, and others. Common scale for architectural modelling.
1:182.88		1.667 mm		A newer scale utilized in ancient, fantasy and sci-fi hobbyist miniature wargaming. Known as "10 mm figure scale" in wargaming circles.
1:160		1.905 mm	Model railways (N)	American and European model trains in N scale. Commonly used for mini armor. 10 mm to 12 mm figure scale for miniature wargaming.
1:152		2.005 mm		2mm scale / British N scale railway modeling.
1:150		2.032 mm	Model railways (Japanese N)	Used by Heller for model ships, and proposed by the Japanese to supersede 1:144 scale trains. Models which are commonly made in scale at 1:150 are commercial airliners - such as the Airbus A320, Boeing 777 all the way to the jumbo jets - the Airbus A380 & Boeing 747.
1:148		2.059 mm	Model railways (British N)	British N model railroad scale.
1:144	1/12 in	2.117 mm		HOO scale - Popular for ships, aircraft, rockets, spacecraft. Occasionally used with NASCAR cars. Also some Japanese N scale trains, as well as Japanese giant robot models (such as Gunpla) and toys. The scale used for a Dollhouse-in-a-dollhouse for 1:12 Full Scale dollhouses. Commonly used for mini armor. Used for 12 mm, and 12.5 mm figure scale miniature wargaming.
1:128	3/32 in	2.381 mm		A few rockets and some fit-in-the-box aircraft are made to this size.
1:120	0.1 in	2.54 mm	Model railways (TT)	Derived from the scale of 1 inch equals 10 feet.TT model railroad scale. Used in AD&D Battlesystem Skirmishes rules. Works with 15 mm miniatures where a 6 foot man would equal 15.24 mm
1:110		2.771 mm		Used for some model ships, aircraft and diecast cars.
1:108		2.822 mm		An historic size for ships, also used for rockets and spacecraft. 15 mm figure scale for wargaming is considered interchangeable with this scale.
1:100		3.048 mm		Aircraft by Tamiya and Plasticart, military vehicles and ships by Zvezda. Kits of historic and modern spacecraft. Japanese aircraft, spacecraft, and giant robots (Bandai's Master Grade). Also referred to as "15 mm figure scale" for use with the mini armor & miniature figurine-based tabletop strategy/skirmish warfare games, Flames of War, Axis & Allies Miniatures, as well as The Face of Battle, and I Ain't Been Shot Mum!. Common scale for architectural modelling.
1:96	1/8 in	3.175 mm		An historic scale for ships, also used for spacecraft.
1:91.44		3.333 mm		A popular scale for World War II hobbyist miniature wargaming. Also known as "20 mm figure scale" in wargaming.
1:90		3.387 mm		A scale proposed by some European manufacturers (e.g. Wiking) to supersede HO scale.
1:87.1		3.5 mm	Model railways (HO/h0)	Exact HO scale (half O of 7 mm = 1 foot)
1:87		3.503 mm	Model railways (HO/h0)	Civilian and military vehicles. Often used to describe HO scale. Original nominal 25 mm figure scale; though a 6-foot human in 1:87 is closer to 21 mm.
1:82		3.717 mm		An intermediate scale (HO/OO) intended to apply to both HO and OO scale train sets. Also used for some military models
1:80		3.810 mm		HOj scale. Very close to wargaming 20 mm figure scale (20 mm is actually 1:80.5).
1:76.2		4 mm	Model railways (00)	UK model rail scale 4 mm scale (OO Scale, etc.).
1:76		4.011 mm	Model railways (00); Military models	Military vehicles. Used with 4 mm to 1 foot models as well.
1:75		4.064 mm		Used by Heller for model ships. Also some Japanese aircraft kits from the 1960s.
1:73.152		4.167 mm		Common scale for hobbyist miniature wargaming and role playing games with science fiction or fantasy subjects, where it is referred to as "25mm" (for the real-world height of a 6-foot-tall scale figure). Examples include Striker, Gamma World and (especially) Dungeons & Dragons. There has been a "scale creep" over the years as manufacturers produce more-imposing figures, leading to a current designation of "28mm" for the larger pieces.
1:72	1/6 in	4.233 mm	Aircraft models	At 1 inch in this scale = 6 feet (man's height) in the real world. Aircraft, science fiction, space non fiction, figures, vehicles, and watercraft. Now the most prolific small scale (i.e. less than 1:35) for plastic injection armoured fighting vehicle (AFV) models, and also 20 mm plastic model figurines and scale model vehicles and aircraft by companies such as Airfix.
1:65		4.689 mm		Ships, die-cast cars. Similar to 1:64.
1:64		4.763 mm		Ships, die-cast cars. Matchbox and Hot Wheels use this scale to describe their vehicles, although the actual scale of the individual models varies from 1:55 to beyond 1:100. Same as S Scale. Also called 3/16 in. scale. Known as 25 mm figure scale in wargaming circles.
1:60.96		5.000 mm		Common scale for pre-1970s hobbyist miniature wargaming figures. Some companies such as Privateer Press are producing new figures in this scale. Because 28 mm figure scale wargaming miniatures have crept in scale over the years, these new "30 mm figure scale" wargaming miniatures are similar in proportion to the current 28 mm figure scale wargaming miniatures. Force of Arms, Westwind and s&s models also use this scale for their range of resin and metal World War II and modern 28 mm figure scale vehicles.
1:60	0.2 in	5.080 mm		Used by Dungeons & Dragons Miniatures. High-detail, Japanese giant robot model kits, primarily produced by Bandai, are of this scale. Some Japanese toy manufacturers also produce aircraft toys in this scale. Rare model rail scale from Germany.
1:56		5.442 mm		Another common scale for 28 mm figure scale wargaming vehicles - manufacturers in this scale include Wargames Factory, Die Waffenkammer/JTFM Enterprises, NZWM/Army Group North, Force of Arms and Warlord Games.
1:55		5.644 mm		Used by Siku for cars and trucks. Also used by Mattel for Disney's "Cars" toys.
1:50		6.096 mm		Many European die-cast construction vehicles and trucks. Some early Japanese aircraft kits are also of this scale, and it is the standard scale for hand-crafted wooden aircraft models in Japan. Common scale for architectural modelling. Used for 32 mm "Heroic scale" figures for 28mm scale wargames and tabletop rpgs.
1:48	1/4 in	6.350 mm	Aircraft models Dollhouse; Military models Wargaming	For dollhouse applications, 1:48 is commonly known as quarter scale (as it is one-quarter of the 1:12 "standard" dollhouse scale). Also known as "quarter inch scale" because a .25 inches is equal to one foot. Mainly military aircraft, but in 2005 Tamiya launched a new series of armored fighting vehicle (AFV) models in this scale. It is the American O scale. Architectural model scale corresponding to widely used architectural drawing scale in the U.S. Also the main Lego scale, known as minifig scale. The rather uncommon 40 mm figure scale wargames figures fit approximately into this scale.
1:45		6.773 mm		This is the scale which MOROP has defined for O scale, because it is half the size of the 1:22.5 Scale G-gauge model railways made by German manufacturers.
1:43.5		7.02 mm	Model railways (0)	Exact O scale of 7 mm = 1 foot.
1:43		7.088 mm	Die-cast cars	Still the most popular scale for die-cast cars worldwide, metric or otherwise. It originates from British O scale.
1:40	0.3 in	7.620 mm	Dinosaur Models	The very early models of the British Coronation Coach and a few other horse-drawn wagons were made in this scale. Cheap soft plastic soldier figures are also made to this scale; there are a few kits to make vehicles for them.
1:38.4	5/16"			Scale for RC model ships, usually produced by Dumas
1:36		8.467 mm		Popular scale for period ship plans — 1 inch = 3 feet.
1:35		8.709 mm	Military models	The most popular scale for military vehicles and 50mm / 2-inch scale figures. Used heavily in models of armoured vehicles. It was originally conceived by Tamiya for convenience of fitting motorised parts and batteries. Corresponds well with 54mm figures.
1:34		8.965 mm		A popular scale for collecting vintage and modern American truck models. Established by First Gear, Inc. in the early 1990s with growing popularity in Europe and Australia.
1:33		9.236 mm		The most common scale for paper model kits of aircraft.
1:32	3/8"	9.525 mm	Model railways (1); Aircraft models Car models Toy soldiers	54 mm / 2.12-inch figure scale toy soldiers are supposed to use this scale as well. Same as Gauge 1, cars, common for slot cars. Commonly referred to as Stablemate size in model horses.
1:30.5		10 mm		Often quoted as the alternative to 1:32 scale.
1:30	0.4 in	10.16 mm		58mm / 2.25-inch scale Toy soldiers and military vehicles including King & Country and Figarti.
1:29		10.51 mm		American model trains running on 45 mm Gauge 1 track.
1:28		10.89 mm		Biplane fighters, "brass era" cars (Midori, Union, Revell of Germany), die-cast cars (Spec-cast, First Gear).
1:25		12.19 mm		Cars, figures. AMT (now combined with Ertl), Revell, and Jo-Han diecast cars. Chinese painted human figures in this scale are marketed for use with (but are slightly undersized for) G Scale train layouts, but are often used as passengers in 1:24 or 1:22.5 cars and trains. In Europe, this scale is preferred over 1:24. The Netherlands has whole toy villages in this scale. This scale is also standard in most theatre design models used to represent set designs before being built
1:24	1/2 in	12.70 mm	Plastic cars Aircraft; Model railways	Largest common scale for model aircraft, such as those produced by Airfix. Common scale for cars and figures. Half-Scale dollhouses and some American dollhouse brands. Die-cast vehicles by Danbury and Franklin Mint. American G Scale trains by Delton Mfg. and Aristocraft Classics. Model horses ("Little Bit" size). Playmobil toys.
1:22.5		13.55 mm	Model railways (G)	G Scale trains made by German manufacturers.
1:21				Scale for model aircraft, usually produced by Dumas.
1:20.3	0.6 in	15.3 mm		F scale Trains. 3' Narrow Gauge with 45mm track.
1:20	0.6 in	15.24 mm		Cars, common for Formula One models.
1:19		16.04 mm		16mm scale Live steam model railways. This is also the scale for those "four-inch" adventure movie figurines.
1:18	0.67 in	16.93 mm		Cars made from kits, 1:18 scale diecast models, Two-Thirds Scale children's dollhouses, Lundby dollhouse figures and furniture, (very rarely) aircraft kits such as by MPM. The 3.75-inch G.I. Joe: A Real American Hero line of figures and vehicles is in this scale, although the figures are compatible with 1:16 vehicles rather than 1:18 cars. Action figures marketed as 3.75 inches, 3 3/4 inches, or 4 inches approximate this scale; this includes the original Star Wars action figures from Kenner, as well as the Fisher-Price Adventure People line which influenced the Star Wars figures and the Micronauts figures which preceded them. This is one of the most common scales of action figure.
1:16	3/4 in	19.05 mm	Military models	Live steam trains (non-ridable), Figures. Ertl's popular line of farm and construction machinery is produced in this size. RC Tanks produced by Tamiya, Heng Long, Matto, AsiaTam, WSN, Torro, Scale model kits by Takom, Trumpeter, Eduard, Kirin, Dragon. Three-Quarters Scale dollhouses and dollhouses by Lundby.
1:15	0.8 in	20.32 mm		Used for some animal figures and automobile models. Fontanini produces 5 inch nativity scene figures at this scale.
1:14	0.8571428 in	21.77 mm		Tamiya Tamiya 56301 RC 1:14 King Hauler, RC Tractor Trucks 1:14 Scale.
1:13.71		22.225 mm		Model railway scratchbuilders' scale at 7/8 inches to a foot, commonly used with 45 mm gauge track to represent 2 ft gauge prototypes.
1:13	59/64 in	23.44 mm		Aurora "Monster Scenes" and "Prehistoric Scenes" Kits.
1:12	1 in	25.40 mm	Plastic cars Action figures	6-inch action figures (such as Marvel Legends), model cars (static and R/C driven), live steam trains (non-ridable), "Full Scale" dollhouses for adult collectors, motorcycles, model horses ("Classic scale").
1:10		30.48 mm	Action figures	Motorcycles, radio-controlled cars (off-road buggies, stadium trucks), 7-inch action figures (such as Marvel Select and DC Multiverse).
1:9	1.2 in	33.87 mm		Motorcycles, Miniature park, Mego 8-inch [203.2 mm] dolls (World's Greatest Super Heroes), model horses (traditional scale).
1:8	1 1/2 in	38.10 mm		Cars, motorcycles, Live steam trains (ridable), Miniature park, IC radio-controlled cars, Japanese garage kit figures, Aurora Classic Monster Kits, (rarely) aircraft kits such as World War I fighters by Hasegawa
1:7		43.54 mm		Common scale utilized by Japanese companies for figures of anime characters, especially when the portrayed character is supposed to be young in age. The scale of a standard 4-stud × 2-stud Lego brick compared to the unit size of a standard house brick (9 × 4 1/2 × 3 inches).
1:6	2 in	50.80 mm		EFRA regulation off-road radio-controlled buggies. "Playscale" Articulated 12-inch figures, such as G.I. Joe and Dragon, children's fashion dolls like Barbie and Dollfie, static display figures (commonly of anime characters). Motorcycles, rail cannons, armored vehicles, military dioramas.
1:5		60.96 mm		Large scale radio-controlled cars
1:4.5				Sybarite (fashion doll)
1:4	3 in	76.20 mm		Radio-controlled cars, ridable miniature railways, steamrollers, traction engines, plastic model engines, larger 18-inch [457 mm] collectible fashion dolls, pocketbike racing, Minibike, Mini chopper, Midget car racing, Quarter Midget racing
1:3	4 in	101.60 mm		P scale - ridable narrow gage park railroads, steamrollers, traction engines, Ball-jointed dolls, Super Dollfie, Dollfie Dream
1:2.4	5 in	127.00 mm		Park railroads, where 15 in (381 mm) minimum gauge models are based on 3 ft (914 mm) narrow gauge prototypes
1:2	6 in	152.40 mm		"My Size" (3 ft) fashion dolls
1:1.8				Playhome, Playhouse
1:1.5				Playhome, Playhouse
1:1.34				Playhome, Playhouse
1:1.2				Petite size, U.S. standard clothing size
1:1.125				Petite size, U.S. standard clothing size
1:1	12 in	304.80 mm		Full scale, life-size. Some models of real and fictional weapons and of scientific or anatomical subjects in this scale.
>1:1				Larger than life-size. Some models of scientific or anatomical subjects in these scales.
