= Angriff! =

Miniatures wargame rules using 1:285 scale micro armour

The 1st, 2nd and 3rd editions of Angriff!

Angriff! (German: "Attack!"), subtitled "A practical set of World War II Wargaming rules for use with the HO and MICRO scale enthusiast", is a set of rules for miniature wargaming set in World War II designed especially for use with HO scale and 1:285 scale micro armor. The booklet was released by Z&M Publishing Enterprises in 1968.

Cover of Banzai!, 1976

== Description ==
Tabletop wargaming using miniatures had been a popular hobby since the 19th century, mainly simulating battles from the Napoleonic era using various sets of rules for movement and combat. Fifteen years after the end of World War II, toy companies such as Airfix began to manufacture plastic miniatures of modern soldiers and mechanized units in both HO scale and 1:285 scale. In 1968, Richard Zimmerman and David Myers designed a booklet titled Angriff! that contained a set of rules for World War II tanks, artillery, and infantry in the European Theater. They formed Z&M Publishing Enterprises in order to publish it.

The booklet proved popular, and Zimmerman and Myers released a second edition with expanded and revised rules in 1972, published this time by Lakeshore Press. They published a third edition in 1982.

In 1976, Z&M published Banzai!, which used the Angriff! rules set but included arms and armament used in the Pacific Theater.

In 1984, Z&M published Total Conflict by Gary W. Blum, which again used the Angriff! rules set, but was designed for modern Cold War conflict between NATO forces (American, British and West German) and Soviet forces.

== Basic rules ==
The two players randomly determine who will move first. The order of movement and combat is:

1. Side A moves 1/3 of its move, plus an additional 3" for all vehicles or men on roads.
2. Side B moves 1/3 of its move, plus an additional 3" for all vehicles or men on roads.
3. Artillery fire, if any, commences.
4. Tanks or vehicle mounted weapons fire.
5. Small arms fire, if any, commences.
6. Side B moves the remaining 2/3 of its move (but only 1/3 if it has fired).
7. Side A moves the remaining 2/3 of its move (but only 1/3 if it has fired).

Movement rates and artillery fire are provided for various vehicles and artillery pieces. Extensive appendices provide details of tank armor and the chances of hitting a target at a given range.

== Reception ==
Richard W. Knisely, in the November 1975 issue of Wargamer's Digest, compared various sets of modern-era wargaming rules, and said of Angriff! "these rules are somewhat simpler than Tractics and Wargame Rules — Armor and Infantry 1925–1950 but are almost as comprehensive." He liked that Angriff! could be used "without alteration for micro or HO scale", and concluded, "These rules are suitable for use at company level and up to about battalion level."

== Reviews ==
- Panzerfaust and Campaign #74
