= 1:144 scale =

Common scale used in modeling

1:144 scale is a scale used for some scale models such as micro/mini armor. 1:144 means that the dimensions of the model are 1/144 (0.00694) the dimensions of the original life-sized object; this equates to a scale of 1/2 inch per 6 feet of original dimension. For instance, an airplane 30 feet (9.14 m) in length would be a mere 2.5 inches (63.5 mm) long as a 1:144 scale model.

1:144 scale finished and semi-finished models are becoming a popular trend not only in Asia, but in the West as well. Many European and American collectors are welcoming them for both model military vehicle display and miniature wargaming purposes. It is twice as large as traditional micro armor / mini armor of the 1:285 (~6 mm (0.236 in) figure) and 1:300 (~5 mm (0.197 in) figure) scale yet practically just as useful.

1:144 (~12 mm (0.472 in) figure) scale modeling and miniatures are considered closely related to N scale (1:148-1:160 scale) (~10 mm (0.394 in) figure) and many pieces from both scales can be used interchangeably.

== Dollhouses and miniatures ==
In the construction and use of dollhouses, 1:144 scale represents the scale that a 1:12 scale dollhouse would have in a 1:12 scale dollhouse. This is often called Dolls' dollhouse or Dollhouse's dollhouse.

At this scale, a typical house is about 50 mm (1.969 in) across. Making internal parts for such a house is a difficult task for the home hobbyist. Commercial manufacturers often use laser cutting technology to ensure clean lines.

== Die-cast models ==
1:144 is a popular scale for die-cast model airplanes. This scale is usually for large aircraft such as airliners and bombers.

Racing Champions also made many lines of micro cars and trucks during the late 1990s. These models included NASCAR stock cars, NHRA funny cars and top fuel rail dragsters, classic automobiles, sought-after muscle cars, and even semi trucks. Although these Ertl-manufactured models are described as 1:144 scale; they are actually 1.5 in (38.1 mm) replicas.

== Action figures ==
1:144 scale is also the primary scale of High Grade and Real Grade Gundam model-kits and toys.

== Plastic military models ==
There are also a growing number of 1:144 military models. The scale (compatible with the N scale of railroad modeling) gained popularity in Japan. The available products include pre-painted and assembled World War II / modern armour such as Doyusha's CanDo line and Subarudo's World Tank Museum line, and pre-painted, semi-assembled World War II aircraft. Military miniature companies like Pendraken, Pithead Miniatures, Game Figures Inc. and Magister Militum produce a wide variety of artillery pieces, tanks, infantry vehicles and support weapons in this scale. 1:144 offers wargamers the satisfaction of much greater detail than "micro armour" (which comes in 1:285 and 1:300 scales and of which 1:144 scale is approximately and conveniently twice as large) with the models remaining small enough to fight entire battles on a simple dinner table.

So far the games meant specifically for 1:144 scale are Heavy_Gear (Dream Pod 9 (1994)) and World Tank Campaigns (Takara Tomy (2009)).

=== Manufacturers of 1:144 Scale Micro Armor ===
Companies that produce 1:144 scale miniature tanks / micro armor sets include the following:

- Dragon Models Limited (Doyusha) "Can.Do" "Pocket Army" (blind box) (pre-painted plastic)
- Takara Tomy (Subarudo, Kaiyodo) - Panzertales "World Tank Museum" (Injection Molded Plastic) (blind box)
  - To be used in the same companies "World Tank Campaigns" game
- 21st Century Toys (produces "Ultimate Soldier") - New Millennium Toys: "WWII Classic Armor" (sold at stores like Wal-Mart)
- MiniHobbyModels (one of the many reboxed brands, aka Crown, ARII etc.)
- Trumpeter
- Pegasus Hobbies - "Military Museum Collection" (Plastic)
- Panzer Depot (Resin Cast)
- Unimax - Forces of Valor "Macho Machines" (pre-painted die cast metal) - needs checking on an item by item basis.
- Konami - JSDF Series & Selected items from the "Alien" (movie related) series
- ACI Toys Company Ltd. - "Metal Troops Creation" & AM Models aka Aviation Models
- Popy - "Projekt Panzer" & "Prokect Flieger"
- Preiser (Plastic) (Tank crews & Aviation Aircrew and Ground Staff, both Civil and Military(NATO) )
- DAMEYA (trucks)
- F-Toys - 1/144 Workshops (may be aircraft, helicopters & selected Star Wars items)
- Combat Group Dynamix (CGD) - 1:144 Micro Dioramas and Accessories, 1:144 Wargaming series armour, and accessories for 1:144 wargaming (all have pre-painted and unpainted models).
- Pro Hobby
- Wargames South
- Victrix Limited - A range of WWII armour and infantry in plastic, for Germany and the major Allied powers, intended mainly for wargamers.

=== Manufacturers of N Scale Micro Armor ===
- Minifigs / Game Figures Inc (GFI) - producers of N scale metallic micro armor specifically for miniature wargaming.
- GHQ - producers of N scale and primarily 1:285 scale metallic micro armor specifically for miniature wargaming since 1967.
- Combat Group Dynamix (CGD) - WarGoesOn series, "Micro-Diorama" series - dioramas for 1:144 scale, compatible with N scale/1:160 scale. This company uses a special 3D computer printer to produce its newer products.
- Perrin
- DM Toys
- Kallistra - manufacturer of large range of 1:144 scale miniatures
- Herpa/Roco - "Roco Minitanks"
- Pendraken Miniatures - large range of vehicles from World War I through to Vietnam War.
- Pithead Miniatures
- Magister Militum

== Model warship combat models ==
The majority of model warships built for model warship combat are constructed from scratch or partial kits in 1/144 scale although some exist in other scales.

== Styrene kits ==
1:144 scale has become a very popular scale for airliners and other large aircraft, however, there is a large number of other aircraft kits that are produced. The large size of airliners makes this scale ideal for modeling. To use a larger scale would not only be expensive but difficult to manufacture and their size alone would prohibitively limit the market of said kits. Several companies use this scale as well for historical spacecraft such as the Vostok 1, Saturn 1B, and Saturn V (Airfix) and the Space Shuttle (Revell). 1:144 scale is also seeing an increase in popularity in the use of model warships, particularly submarines, though other vessels are available. Aircraft, traditionally have been the primary source of kits, Trumpeter, Revell of Germany, Dragon, Sweet, Platz, Micro Ace (former Arii) and Minicraft are frequent contributors to this growing niche. There is also an ever increasingly number of resin kits in this scale.
