= Korps Commander =

- Korps Commander Rules Cover
- Designers: Bruce Rea Taylor; Andy Ashton
- Publishers: Tabletop Games
- Years active: 1988-1989
- Genres: Wargaming
- Players: 2
- Setup time: 1 hour
- Playing time: 4-8 hours

Korps Commander, or "Korps Commander: The Road to Berlin" is a set of micro armour / miniature wargaming rules designed by Bruce Rea Taylor and Andy Ashton and published in the UK by Tabletop games, August 1988.

These rules simulate actions in the second world war on the Western or Eastern fronts during the final two years of the war for forces up to Corps or Army Levels.

The basic units in the game are tank and mechanised infantry platoons, infantry companies, and artillery batteries. Aircraft may be in flights or squadrons. Logistics and engineers are fully covered.

== Overview ==
Bruce Rea Taylor and Andy Ashton originally intended that Korps Commander would be the start of a family of rules, each covering a period and location, as can be seen by the quote from the Rules.

Road to Berlin is a set of rules in the Korps Commander Series, which will eventually cover all periods of warfare at a level which will allow large battles and campaigns to be fought. The series aim is to utilise the techniques of boardgaming whilst retaining the flavour of miniature gaming.

The Road to Berlin was the first and last of the Korps Commander publications. Bruce Rea Taylor died shortly after the publication of these rules (1989), at the age of 40. I was unable to find any evidence Andy Ashton made any plans to continue this project.

Korps Commander used the Corps Commander: OMG (Operational Manoeuvre Group) game system, which was published in 1986. The differences between these two rules are summarized in the Introduction of Korps Commander.

For those who have played OMG the most significant difference is that the ground scale and time scales have been halved due to the shorter effective ranges of direct fire weapons, although the only noticeable difference is the range of artillery.

Bruce Rea Taylor gives a special mention to the Wallasey Wargames Club in the Introduction of the Korps Commander Rules.

We would like to acknowledge the help of the Wallasey Wargames Club in the preparation and playtesting of these rules.

The primary significance of these rules was it was one of the first game systems which used a scale of 1-2 base(s) per company. The reason why a scale of 1 base per company was not used was to allow for small formations, such as 1-2 SP-AA weapons allocated to a HQ and to ensure the record keeping for the standard company sized formations was not too difficult. However, apart from this, the rules attempted to use a 1 Base = 1 company scale, which allowed players to command one, or more, divisions. Compared with the most common rules used in this period, this was unusual.

In practice the detail and complexity of the rules precluded any possibility of playing a corps level game within a reasonable time frame. Most games would typically field 50 bases, or elements, per side. This represents a force of 25 companies per side. A game of this size which consisted of 24 game-turns, or one game day duration, could be completed within a 4-8 hour period.

== History ==
Bruce Rea Taylor and Andy Ashton published Corps Commander in July 1986. This used the same game system as Korps Commander and can be considered the first of the Corps/Korps Commander system publications. In October 1986 "Digest #3, Engineering Equipment Data, Engineering Lists, Engineering Scenarios" was published, this contained additional material for Corps Commander. In June 1988 "Corps Commander: By Air & Sea" was published, containing yet more supporting material for Corps Commander. The final publication in this family was in August 1988 when "Korps Commander" was published.

While Bruce Rea Taylor published a number of additional books after August 1988, they were all dated after his death on 3 March 1989. No additional Corp/Korps Commander books were published after August 1988. These post August 1988 publications are listed here:

- Digest #4, Ultra Modern Army Lists for Challenger II Rules, Apr 1989 (For Challenger II)
- Digest #5, Ultra Modern Army Lists for Challenger II Rules, June 1989 (For Challenger II)

There is strong evidence Bruce Rea Taylor built on his earlier rules, Challenger and Firefly, when developing the Corp/Korps Commander Rules. This is especially evident in the equipment specification. Players in the last 20 years have used these earlier rules to expand Corps/Korps Commander, such as can be seen in the "nikita - Corps Commander: OMG and Korps Kommander" site referenced earlier, and attempts to rewrite the rules as can be seen with Korps-Kommandeur.

== Scale ==
- Model/scenery scale (1:300)
- Ground scale: Each centimetre represents 50 metres (1:5000)

Game-turn : Each daylight Turn represents 1/2 hour of actual time. Each night Turn represents 1 hour of actual time.

- Base/stand - Each base represents a company, part of a company or a platoon. A Base can have a maximum of 9 Strength points. (If there are more than 9 vehicles or Gun's in a Company, the Company is split into two bases, each of which are similar in strength. This system allows a base to also represent a platoon, such as a support platoon attached to a Headquarters company.)
- Vehicle scale : Each AFV Strength point represents 1 AFV.
- Artillery scale : Each Artillery Strength point represents 1 weapon.
- Infantry scale : Each Infantry Strength Point represents approximately 10 combat troops, or 1 heavy weapon.
- Aircraft scale : Each Aircraft Strength Points represents 1 aircraft.

Base Size (1:300 scale) - A Base which has 1 to 5 strength points has a size of 20mm by 30mm. A Base with more than 5 strength points has a size of 30mm by 30mm.

For comparison purposes the earlier Corps Commander used a Ground scale of 10 cm = 1 km (1:10000) and a Daylight Game Turn = 1 hour. Lightning War - Red Storm uses a base size of 30 cm x 30 cm, a ground scale of 1 cm = 100, (1:10000), a Daylight Game Turn = 2 hours. Panzer Korps, while designed for 15mm/20mm, uses a Ground Scale of 1 cm = 50m (1:5000) for 1/300 scale.

== Significance ==
The primary significance of these rules is the use of a 1 Company = 1-2 Base(s) scale. In 1986/1988 this was unusual. Examples of other similar scaled rules are, Great Battles of WWII Vol. 1 (1995), Panzer Korps (2004). and Lightning War - Red Storm (2001-2008).

The most common scale in the late 80's was 1 Vehicle = 1 Base, later rules used scales of 1 Platoon = 1 Base. The primary issue with the increase of the scale was related to the combat specifications of a base. When a base represents a common vehicle or gun, its speed and combat capabilities are based on the figure itself. When a base represents a mix of vehicles or guns, its speed and combat capabilities may differ from the figure on the base.

Example : A Base which contains 5 x Pz I and 2 x Pz II compared with another base which contains 5 x Pz I and 2 x Pz III. Both would be represented by a Pz I, but would differ in combat capabilities.

Players may be required to keep track of the combat capabilities of individual bases by the use of separate written records, or a value printed on the base. In this case the use of a Board-Game system may be preferable.

Corps/Korps Commander resolved this issue by giving each a Base a value, representing the number of common vehicles or guns. When there were different vehicles or guns in a company, the company would be represented by more than 1 base. Each Base would contain the same vehicle/guns and its value would be the number of vehicle/gun in each base.

== See also ==
- Miniature wargaming
