= Panzer Warfare =

Board game

Panzer Warfare (1975)

A set of rules for 1:285 scale miniature wargaming battles set in World War II. Written by Brian Blume and published by TSR, Inc. (the same company that created Dungeons & Dragons) in 1975. This was one of the early games intended for use with micro armour.
