= Corps Commander =

Miniature wargaming rule set

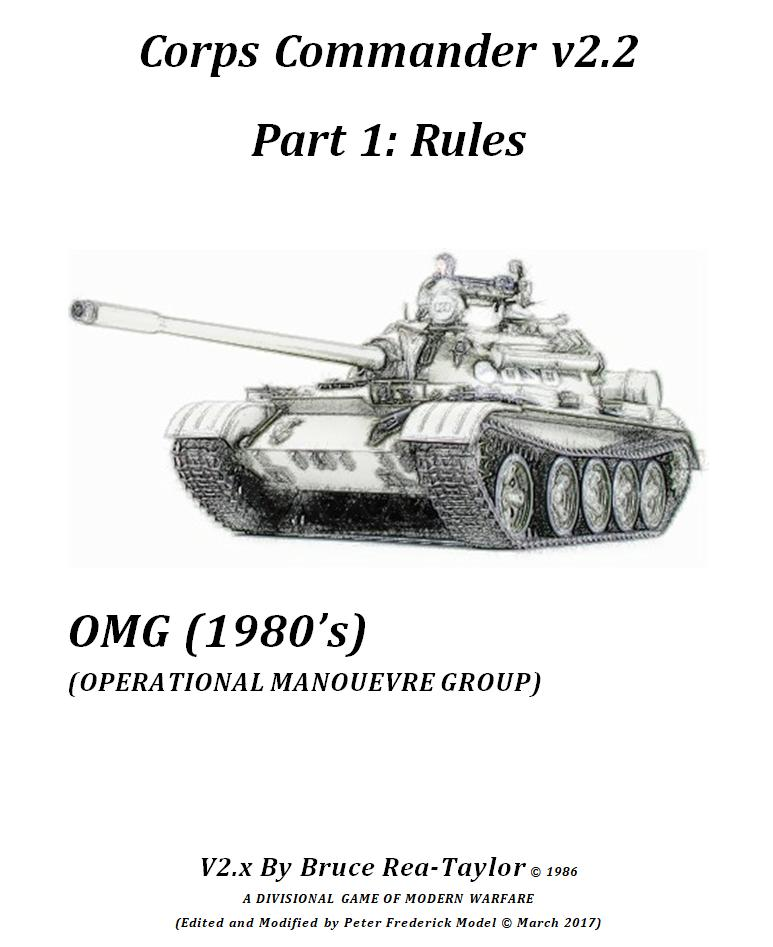
- Corps Commander Rules Cover
- Designers: Bruce Rea Taylor; Andy Ashton
- Publishers: Tabletop Games
- Years active: 1986-1989
- Genres: Wargaming
- Players: 2
- Setup time: 1 hour
- Playing time: 4-8 hours

Corps Commander, or "Corps Commander: Operational Manoeuvre Group" is a set of micro armour / miniature wargaming rules designed by Bruce Rea Taylor and Andy Ashton and published in the UK by Tabletop games copyrighted by B. A. Rea Taylor, A. Ashton & Tabletop Games July 1986.

These rules simulates modern warfare between forces of up to Corps or Army level in any future war on the Central Front in Europe.

The basic elements (units) in the game are tank and mechanised infantry platoons, infantry companies, and artillery batteries. All aspects of modern warfare are covered including helicopters, air power, NBC, logistics and electronics. A Divisional Level assault can easily be played on a standard 8 by 6 ft (2.4 by 1.8 m) table, whilst a heliborne assault on a vital bridge can be played on a 2 by 2 ft (0.61 by 0.61 m) table. Thus allowing several campaign battles to take place in one evening.

== Overview ==
Bruce Rea Taylor and Andy Ashton originally intended that Corps Commander would be the start of a family of rules, each covering a period and location, as can be seen by the quote from the Rules.

Rules covering sea and airborne assaults, together with details of the Northern and Southern Fronts and the Middle East will follow shortly.

Operational Manoeuvre Group was the first of the Corps Commander / Korps Commander publications. Bruce Rea Taylor died three years after the publication of these rules (1989), at the age of 40. I was unable to find any evidence Andy Ashton made any plans to continue this project.

Bruce Rea Taylor gives a special mention to the Wallasey Wargames Club in the Introduction of the Korps Commander Rules. he used wargaming clubs as a method to play test his rules system.

We would like to acknowledge the help of the Wallasey War-games Club in the preparation and play testing of these rules, and also those in Nottingham (Rob at Heroes is the one to contact). Please send a Stamped Addressed Envelope if you have any queries.

The primary significance of these rules was it was one of the first game systems which used a scale of 1-2 base(s) per company. The reason why a scale of 1 base per company was not used was to allow for small formations, such as 1-2 SP-AA weapons allocated to a HQ and to ensure the record keeping for the standard company sized formations was not too difficult. However, apart from this, the rules attempted to use a 1 Base = 1 company scale, which allowed players to command one, or more, divisions. Compared with the most common rules used in this period, this was unusual.

In practice the detail and complexity of the rules precluded any possibility of playing a corps level game within a reasonable time frame. Most games would typically field 50 bases, or elements, per side. This represents a force of 25 companies per side. A game of this size which consisted of 12 game-turns, or one game day duration, could be completed within a 4-8 hour period.

== History ==
Bruce Rea Taylor and Andy Ashton published Corps Commander in July 1986. This used the same game system as Korps Commander and can be considered the first of the Corps/Korps Commander system publications. In October 1986 "Digest #3, Engineering Equipment Data, Engineering Lists, Engineering Scenarios" was published, this contained additional material for Corps Commander. In June 1988 "Corps Commander: By Air & Sea" was published, containing yet more supporting material for Corps Commander. The final publication in this family was in August 1988 when "Korps Commander" was published.

While Bruce Rea Taylor published a number of additional books after August 1988, they were all dated after his death on 3 March 1989. No additional Corp/Korps Commander books were published after August 1988. These post August 1988 publications are listed here:

- Digest #4, Ultra Modern Army Lists for Challenger II Rules, Apr 1989 (For Challenger II)
- Digest #5, Ultra Modern Army Lists for Challenger II Rules, June 1989 (For Challenger II)

There is strong evidence Bruce Rea Taylor built on his earlier rules, Challenger and Firefly, when developing the Corp/Korps Commander Rules. This is especially evident in the equipment specification.

== Development ==
Corps Commander was published in July 1986. Shortly after this an errata sheet was published which was printed on the inside cover of the rules. Digest #3, published in Oct 1986, and contained some additional supporting information, but no changes to the rules. The Air & Sea supplement, printed in June 1988, contained a large number of additional rules, as well as some minor changes to the base rules. The publishing of Korps Commander, in August 1988, contained a large number of changes to the rules. A number of these were as a result of the period, such as the game scale, however a number represents corrections to the original Corps Commander rules.

A number of unusual tactics were available to players of the original Corps Commander rules, which Korps Commander eliminated. In additional to this a number of other changes were implemented which improved the accuracy of the rules. These included;

- Rocket artillery could affect more than a single element.
- A single forward observer could not bring down an unlimited number of fire support missions in a single game-turn.
- The fire effects of a fire combat could affect future fire combats in the same phase, thus an element could, in a limited manner, react to fire before subsequent fire was directed against it.
- Elements in concentrated mode could not take advantage of fortification.
- MMG indirect fire was added.
- Addition of battalion level command, especially for fire support purposes.
- Troops mounted in soft transports could no longer conduct close combat more effectively than if dismounted.
- The Lorry was added, this was a truck not designed for troops to fight from or around. It represent a large vehicle which was difficult to dismount from and unwise to fight from.
- Some additional rules around orders, such as attack, defend, manoeuvre and retreat.
- Addition moral modifiers were added to make it harder for element to fight until they were eliminated.
- Building fortifications took a lot longer.
- Reconnaissance missions could be intercepted by enemy CAP.
- Observation missions used standard observation rules to locate targets.

It is likely that these changes were intended to be added to corps commander in a possible future publication, however this never occurred.

== Scale ==
- Model/scenery scale (1:300)
- Ground scale : Each centimetre represents 100 metres (1:10000)

Game-turn scale : Each daylight Turn represents 1 hour of actual time. Each night Turn represents 2 hour of actual time.

Base/Stand scale - Each base represents a company, part of a company or a platoon. A Base can have a maximum of 9 Strength points. (If there are more than 9 vehicles or Gun's in a Company, the Company is split into two bases, each of which are similar in strength. This system allows a base to also represent a platoon, such as a support platoon attached to a Headquarters company.)

- Vehicle scale : Each AFV Strength point represents 1 AFV.
- Artillery scale : Each Artillery Strength point represents 1 weapon.
- Infantry scale : Each Infantry Strength Point represents approximately 10 combat troops, or 1 heavy weapon.
- Aircraft scale : Each Aircraft Strength Points represents 1 aircraft.

Base size (1/300 scale) - A Base which has 1 to 5 strength points has a size of 20mm by 30mm. A Base with more than 5 strength points has a size of 30mm by 30mm.

For comparison purposes the later Korps Commander used a Ground scale of 5 cm = 1 km (1:5000) and a Daylight Game Turn = 1/2 hour. Lightning War - Red Storm uses a base size of 30 cm x 30 cm, a ground scale of 1 cm = 100, (1:10000), a Daylight Game Turn = 2 hours. Panzer Korps, while designed for 15mm/20mm, uses a Ground Scale of 1 cm = 50m (1:5000) for 1/300 scale.

== Significance ==
The primary significance of these rules is the use of a 1 Company = 1-2 Base(s) scale. In 1986/1988 this was unusual. Examples of other similar scaled rules are, Great Battles of WWII Vol. 1 (1995), Panzer Korps (2004). and Lightning War - Red Storm (2001-2008).

- 1973: Wargame Rules Armour & Infantry 1925 to 1950 v1 Squad / Vehicle
- 1974: Wargames Rules for Armoured Warfare 1950 to 1985 v1 Squad / Vehicle
- 1975: Wargame Rules Armour & Infantry 1925 to 1950 v2 Squad / Vehicle
- 1978: Cambrai to Sinai Squad / Vehicle
- 1978: Combat Commander 1973-1983 v1 Squad / Vehicle
- 1979: Combat Commander 1973-1983 v2 Squad / Vehicle
- 1979: Wargames Rules for Armoured Warfare 1950 to 1985 v2 Squad / Vehicle
- 1980: Combat Commander 1973-1983 v3 Squad / Vehicle
- 1983: Challenger Squad / Vehicle
- 1983: Combined Arms - Rules for WWII inf-Arm Actions Squad / Vehicle
- 1986: Corps Commander Coy / Platoon *
- 1987: Firefly Squad / Vehicle
- 1988: Korps Commander Coy / Platoon *
- 1988: Combined Arms - Modern Miniature Wargaming Platoon *

The most common scale in the late 80's was 1 Vehicle = 1 Base, later rules used scales of 1 Platoon = 1 Base. The primary issue with the increase of the scale was related to the combat specifications of a base. When a base represents a common vehicle or gun, its speed and combat capabilities are based on the figure itself. When a base represents a mix of vehicles or guns, its speed and combat capabilities may differ from the figure on the base.

Example : A Base which contains 5 x Pz I and 2 x Pz II compared with another base which contains 5 x Pz I and 2 x Pz III. Both would be represented by a Pz I, but would differ in combat capabilities.

Players may be required to keep track of the combat capabilities of individual bases by the use of separate written records, or a value printed on the base. In this case the use of a Board-Game system may be preferable.

Corps/Korps Commander resolved this issue by giving each a Base a value, representing the number of common vehicles or guns. When there were different vehicles or guns in a company, the company would be represented by more than 1 base. Each Base would contain the same vehicle/guns and its value would be the number of vehicle/gun in each base.

== See also ==
- Miniature wargaming
