= 1:200 scale =

Scale for models and miniatures

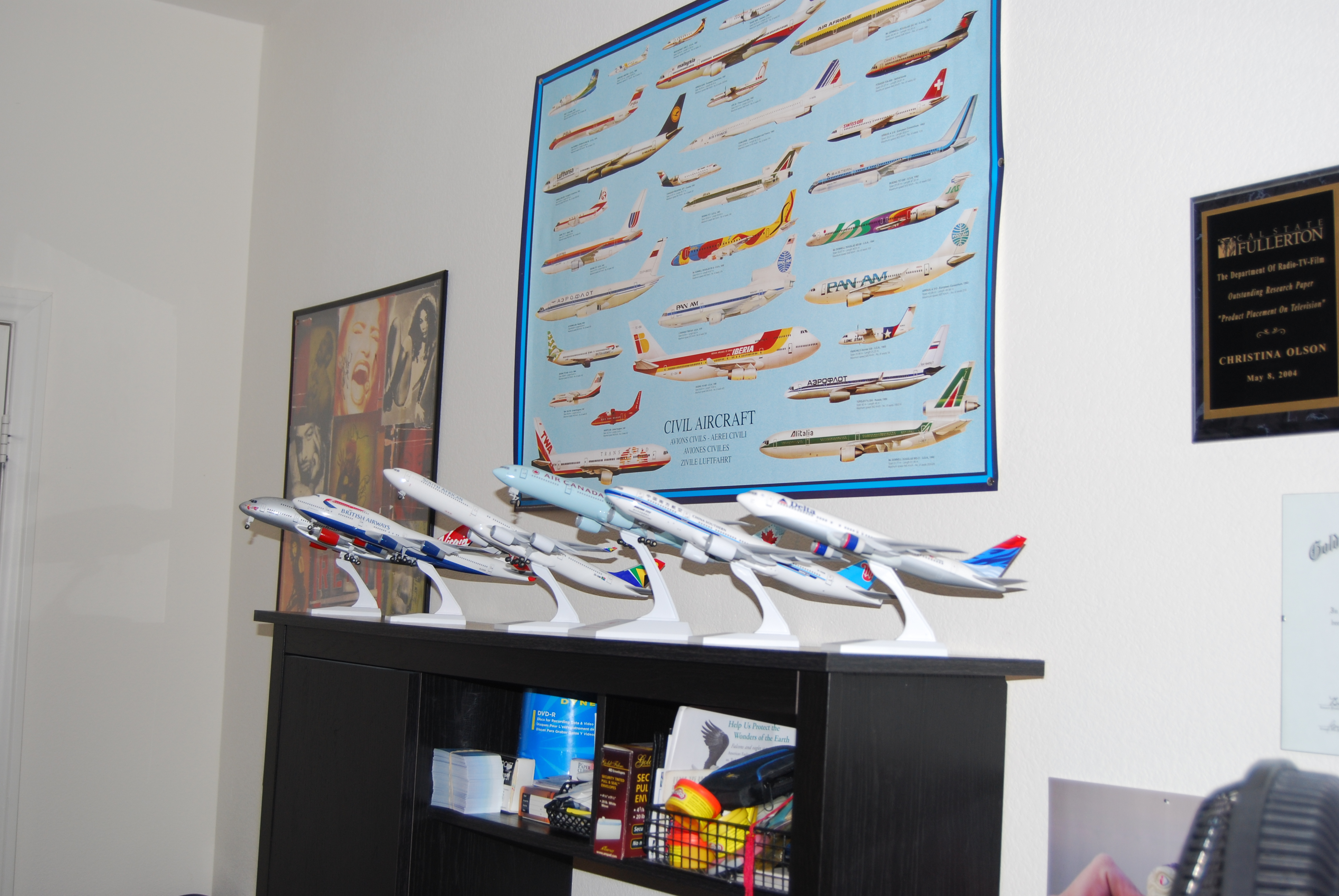
An airline model aircraft collection in the 1:200 scale. Represented here are models of Delta, China Southern, Air Canada, South African Airways, British Airways and Virgin Atlantic airlines.

The 1:200 scale is a modeling scale used in the model building hobby. A vehicle or building made in the 1:200 scale, fits 200 times inside its real-life counterpart (in one dimension; it would fit 8 million times if packed three-dimensionally, and would weigh 8 million times less).

A large percentage of models produced in this scale are aircraft models. Companies such as Hasegawa distribute 1:200 scale-sized airliners and military aircraft. Flight Miniatures also produces many airliner and military aircraft models in the scale, both die cast and plastic ones.

Ships are also sometimes available in this scale.

In the world of model aircraft - the 1:200 scale is very popular for a range of military aircraft models, in particular - large aircraft such as bombers, cargo and transporters.

A bit less popular, but comparable in size, is the 1:250 scale.

== See also ==
- 1:600 scale
- 1:400 scale
- 1:250 scale
- 1:150 scale
