= Axis & Allies Naval Miniatures: War at Sea =

Tabletop game

Axis & Allies Naval Miniatures: War At Sea is a standalone miniature wargame, originally produced by Avalon Hill, later by Wizards of the Coast. Axis and Allies Naval Miniatures gameplay is associated with Axis & Allies Miniatures, a World War 2 land battles game also made by Avalon Hill, but the two games are very different. Players take command of miniatures that are 1/1800 scale and represent fleets of individual warships, submarines, and squadrons of Aircraft.

== Releases ==
=== Starters ===
- War at Sea Starter Set: Released on March 16, 2007; It includes 9 randomized units, 2 double-sided battle maps, 6 island cards, and 8 six-sided dice.
- War at Sea Starter (Revised): Released on March 16, 2010; It includes 8 non-random miniatures, 2 double-sided battle maps, 4 six-sided dice and a new rule book.

=== Series ===
- War at Sea: Set of 64 models, released on March 16, 2007. It features ships, submarines and aircraft from the UK, US, France, Australia, Germany, Italy and Japan.
- Task Force: Set of 60 models, released on July 25, 2008. Added Canadian and Dutch warships.
- Flank Speed: Set of 40 models, released on September 1, 2009. Introduces Soviet and New Zealander warships.
- Condition Zebra: Set of 40 models, released on June 8, 2010. Introduces Greek and Finnish warships.
- Fleet Command (usually known as Set V): Set of 39 models, released on December 7, 2010. Introduces Polish and Swedish warships.
- Surface Action: Set of 40 models, released on October 24, 2011. Introduces a new Bismarck, LST, HMS Eagle, Taihō, shore batteries, Focke-Wulf Fw 190, and USS Wasp.

== Rules ==
War at Sea uses fairly simple rules. The players can get quickly familiarized with the Quick Start Guide and then continue with the Advanced Rules.

The advanced rules have been periodically updated, beginning in July 2007, with the Clarifications Document. The update introduces new concepts (such as ASW harassment and strafing penalties) not present in the original rules. Since at least one unit of the Task Force expansion set directly refers to these new rules, they are implicitly considered as part of the core ruleset, despite only having been published online to date.

There are some companies and blog sites that offer other ideas for Battles, advanced rules and tactics as well.

== Errata ==
An official FAQ for the Task Force set can be found online.. It addresses errata such as misprints and ambiguously worded rules for the Task Force expansion. Further errata are contained in the Clarifications Document. Only additional unacknowledged errata are listed here:

- The correct name of the Dutch submarine is HNLMS Zwaardvisch, not Zvaardvisch.
- The Focke-Wulf Fw 200 reconnaissance plane was nicknamed "Condor", not "Kondor".
- In the War at Sea base set and the Flank Speed expansion, the colors of the Italian roundel were inverted. The roundel in Task Force was correct. (This error is partially acknowledged in the Clarifications Document.)
- In the expansion Flank Speed, the set checklist lists Voroshilov as part of the Soviet forces, but the actual ship included in the set is Kirov. Both are Kirov-class heavy cruisers of the same series and are considered sister ships.
- The Yamashiro miniature is actually the Fusō. Yamashiro should have the third turret pointing towards the stern. Fusō's third turret points toward the bow.
- The HMS Repulse miniature is actually that of her modernized sister ship HMS Renown, and not the unmodernized HMS Repulse.
- Some HMS Glorious miniatures have the island installed backwards.
- Some USS Houston miniatures have no island installed.

== Units (through Surface Action) ==
Australia

  - HMAS Australia (Fleet Command; Cruiser; Rare)
  - HMAS Arunta (Task Force; Destroyer; Common)
  - HMAS Canberra (War at Sea; Cruiser; Rare)
  - HMAS Nizam (War at Sea Starter; Destroyer; Common)
  - HMAS Sydney (War at Sea; Cruiser; Uncommon)

Canada

  - HMCS Algonquin (Surface Action; Destroyer; Common)
  - HMCS Haida (Task Force; Destroyer; Common)
  - HMCS Sackville (Flank Speed; Corvette; Common)
  - HMCS St. Laurent (Fleet Command; Destroyer; Common)
  - HMCS Uganda (Condition Zebra; Cruiser; Uncommon)

Finland

  - B-239 Buffalo (Fleet Command; Fighter; Common)
  - Väinämöinen (Condition Zebra; Coast Defense Ship; Uncommon)

France

  - Algérie (Fleet Command; Cruiser; Rare)
  - Béarn (Condition Zebra; Aircraft Carrier; Rare)
  - Casabianca (Task Force; Submarine; Common)
  - Dewoitine D.520 (Condition Zebra; Fighter; Common)
  - Dunkerque (Task Force; Battleship; Rare)
  - Jean Bart (Task Force; Battleship; Rare)
  - Gloire (War at Sea; Light Cruiser; Uncommon)
  - Lamotte-Piquet (Condition Zebra; Cruiser; Uncommon)
  - Milan (Flank Speed; Destroyer; Common)
  - Strasbourg (Surface Action; Battleship; Rare)
  - Provence (Condition Zebra; Battleship; Rare)
  - Richelieu (War at Sea; Battleship; Rare)
  - Suffren (Flank Speed; Cruiser; Rare)
  - Le Terrible (War at Sea; Destroyer; Common)
  - V.156 Vindicator (Condition Zebra; Torpedo Plane; Common)

Germany

  - Admiral Graf Spee (War at Sea; Pocket Battleship; Rare)
  - Admiral Hipper (Task Force; Cruiser; Rare)
  - Admiral Scheer (Task Force; Pocket Battleship; Rare)
  - Atlantis (Fleet Command; Merchant Cruiser Raider; Uncommon)
  - Bf 109 (Task Force; Fighter; Common)
  - Bismarck (War at Sea; Battleship; Rare)
  - Blücher (Fleet Command; Cruiser; Rare)
  - Fi 167 (Condition Zebra; Torpedo Plane; Common)
  - Fw 190A (Surface Action; Fighter; Common)
  - Fw 200 Condor (War at Sea; Reconnaissance Plane; Uncommon)
  - Friedrich der Grosse (Fleet Command; Battleship; Rare)
  - Gneisenau (Condition Zebra; Battleship; Rare)
  - Graf Zeppelin (Task Force; Aircraft Carrier; Rare)
  - Ju 87B Stuka (War at Sea; Dive Bomber; Common)
  - Ju 88A-4 (Flank Speed; Bomber; Uncommon)
  - Karlsruhe (Task Force; Cruiser; Uncommon)
  - Königsberg (Surface Action; Cruiser; Uncommon)
  - Köln (War at Sea; Cruiser; Uncommon)
  - M1 (Surface Action; Auxiliary; Common)
  - Moltke (Surface Action; Battlecruiser; Rare)
  - Nordmark (War at Sea; Auxiliary; Uncommon)
  - Nürnberg (Condition Zebra; Cruiser; Uncommon)
  - Prinz Eugen (Flank Speed; Cruiser Rare)
  - Rheinubung Bismarck (Surface Action; Battleship; Rare)
  - S-Boat (Task Force; Torpedo Boat; Common)
  - Scharnhorst (War at Sea; Battle Cruiser; Rare)
  - Schleswig-Holstein (Flank Speed; Battleship; Rare)
  - T27 (Flank Speed; Destroyer Escort; Common)
  - Tirpitz (Task Force; Battleship; Rare)
  - U-47 (Flank Speed; Submarine; Common)
  - U-66 (Task Force; U-Boat; Common)
  - U-510 (War at Sea; U-Boat; Common)
  - U-552 (Fleet Command; U-Boat; Common)
  - U-2511 (Surface Action; Submarine; Common)
  - Z18 Hans Ludemann (Task Force; Destroyer; Common)
  - Z20 Karl Galster (War at Sea; Destroyer; Common)
  - Z32 (Condition Zebra; Destroyer; Common)
  - ZG3 (Fleet Command; Destroyer; Common)

Greece

  - Georgios Averof (Condition Zebra; Cruiser; Rare)
  - Proteus (Condition Zebra; Submarine; Common)
  - Vasilissa Olga (Condition Zebra; Destroyer; Common)

Italy

  - Andrea Doria (Surface Action; Battleship; Rare)
  - Antilope (Fleet Command; Corvette; Common)
  - Ascari (Condition Zebra; Destroyer; Common)
  - Ambra (War at Sea; Submarine; Common)
  - Aquila (Flank Speed; Aircraft Carrier; Rare)
  - Bolzano (War at Sea; Cruiser; Rare)
  - Camicia Nere (Surface Action; Destroyer; Common)
  - C.202 Folgore (Task Force; Fighter; Common)
  - Duilio (Condition Zebra; Battleship; Rare)
  - Emanuele Filiberto Duca d'Aosta (War at Sea; Cruiser; Uncommon)
  - Eugenio di Savoia (Task Force; Cruiser; Uncommon)
  - Giovanni delle Bande Nere (Surface Action; Cruiser; Uncommon)
  - Giulio Cesare (Task Force; Battleship; Rare)
  - Giuseppe Garibaldi (Flank Speed; Cruiser; Uncommon)
  - Gorizia (Flank Speed; Cruiser; Rare)
  - Ju 87 R2 Picchiatelli (Task Force; Dive Bomber; Common)
  - Leonardo da Vinci (Condition Zebra; Submarine; Common)
  - Littorio (Task Force; Battleship; Rare)
  - Luca Tarigo (War at Sea; Destroyer; Common)
  - Motor Torpedo Boat (War at Sea; PT Boat; Common)
  - Pegaso (Flank Speed; Destroyer Escort; Common)
  - RE.2001CB (Flank Speed; Fighter-Bomber; Common)
  - Roma (Fleet Command; Battleship; Rare)
  - San Giorgio (Fleet Command; Cruiser; Rare)
  - Scipione Africano (Fleet Command; Cruiser; Uncommon)
  - SM.79 Sparviero (Task Force; Patrol Bomber; Uncommon)
  - Trento (Condition Zebra; Cruiser; Rare)
  - Ugolino Vivaldi (Task Force; Destroyer; Common)
  - Vittorio Veneto (War at Sea; Battleship; Rare)
  - Z.506B Airone (Condition Zebra; Patrol Bomber; Uncommon)
  - Zara (Task Force; Cruiser; Rare)

Japan

  - A6M2 "Zeke" (War at Sea; Fighter; Common)
  - A6M2 Zero Kamikaze (Task Force; Fighter; Common)
  - A6M2-N "Rufe" (Fleet Command; Seaplane Fighter; Common)
  - A6M5 "Zeke" (Flank Speed; Fighter; Common)
  - Atago (Fleet Command; Cruiser; Rare)
  - Agano (Condition Zebra; Cruiser; Uncommon)
  - Akagi (War at Sea; Aircraft Carrier; Rare)
  - Akizuki (Task Force; Destroyer; Common)
  - Aoba (Flank Speed; Cruiser; Rare)
  - B5N2 "Kate" (War at Sea; Torpedo Plane; Common)
  - B5N2 Type 97 (Surface Action; Torpedo Plane; Common)
  - B6N2 "Jill" (Flank Speed; Torpedo Plane; Common)
  - Chikuma (Condition Zebra; Cruiser; Rare)
  - Chitose (Fleet Command; Seaplane Carrier; Uncommon)
  - D3A "Val" (War at Sea; Dive Bomber; Common)
  - D4YI "Judy" (Task Force; Dive Bomber; Common)
  - Daihatsu Landing Craft (Surface Action; Landing Craft; Common)
  - Elite A6M2 Zero (Surface Action;Fighter;Common)
  - Fusō (Condition Zebra; Battleship; Rare)
  - G4M "Betty" (War at Sea; Bomber; Uncommon)
  - G4M1 "Betty" (War at Sea Starter; Patrol Bomber; Uncommon)
  - H8KI Type 2 "Emily" (Task Force; Seaplane; Uncommon)
  - Haruna (Task Force; Battleship; Rare)
  - Haguro (War at Sea Starter; Cruiser; Rare)
  - Hatsukaze (Surface Action; Destroyer; Common)
  - I-19 (War at Sea; Submarine; Uncommon)
  - I-25 (War at Sea Starter; Submarine; Uncommon)
  - I-26 (Task Force; Submarine; Common)
  - Ise (Fleet Command; Battleship; Rare)
  - Isokaze (Task Force; Destroyer; Common)
  - Jintsu (War at Sea; Cruiser; Uncommon)
  - Jun'yō (Condition Zebra; Aircraft Carrier; Rare)
  - Kaga (Fleet Command; Aircraft Carrier; Rare)
  - Kinai Maru (War at Sea; Transport; Uncommon)
  - Kirishima (Fleet Command; Battleship; Rare)
  - Kongō (War at Sea; Battleship; Rare)
  - Matsu (Condition Zebra; Destroyer; Common)
  - Mogami (Surface Action; Cruiser; Rare)
  - Murasame (Condition Zebra; Destroyer; Common)
  - Musashi (Task Force; Battleship; Rare)
  - Myōkō (War at Sea; Cruiser; Rare)
  - N1K1-J "George" (Condition Zebra; Fighter; Common)
  - Nachi (Task Force; Cruiser; Rare)
  - Nagatsuki (Fleet Command; Destroyer; Common)
  - Nagato (Flank Speed; Battleship; Rare)
  - Naka (Surface Action; Cruiser; Uncommon)
  - Ōi (Flank Speed; Cruiser; Uncommon)
  - Ro-50 (Fleet Command; Submarine; Common)
  - Ryūjō (Surface Action; Aircraft Carrier; Rare)
  - Shigure (Flank Speed; Destroyer; Common)
  - Sho-Go Yamato (Surface Action; Battleship; Rare)
  - Shoho (War at Sea; Aircraft Carrier; Uncommon)
  - Shōkaku (War at Sea; Aircraft Carrier; Rare)
  - Soryu (Flank Speed; Aircraft Carrier; Rare)
  - Suzuya (Condition Zebra; Cruiser; Rare)
  - T1 Landing Ship (Flank Speed; Auxiliary; Common)
  - Taihō (Surface Action; Aircraft Carrier; Rare)
  - Teruzuki (War at Sea Starter; Destroyer; Common)
  - Tone (War at Sea; Cruiser; Rare)
  - Type 13 Subchaser (War at Sea; Escort; Common)
  - Yahagi (Task Force; Cruiser; Uncommon)
  - Yamashiro (Task Force; Battleship; Rare)
  - Yamato (War at Sea; Battleship; Rare)
  - Yukikaze (War at Sea; Destroyer; Common)
  - Zuikaku (Task Force; Aircraft Carrier; Rare)

Netherlands

  - Hr.Ms. De Ruyter (Task Force; Cruiser; Uncommon)
  - Hr.Ms. Van Galen (Task Force; Destroyer; Common)
  - Hr.Ms. Zwaardvisch (Task Force; Submarine; Common)
  - Hr. Ms. Witte de With (Condition Zebra; Destroyer; Common)

New Zealand

  - HMNZS Leander (Flank Speed; Cruiser; Uncommon)

Poland

  - ORP Błyskawica (Fleet Command; Destroyer; Common)
  - ORP Dragon (Surface Action; Cruiser; Uncommon)
  - ORP Orzeł (Fleet Command; Submarine; Common)

Soviet Union

  - Arkhangelsk (Condition Zebra; Battleship; Rare)
  - Gromkiy (Flank Speed; Destroyer; Common)
  - IL-2M Sturmovik (Fleet Command; Attack Aircraft; Common)
  - Kirov (Flank Speed; Cruiser; Rare)
  - Krasnyi Krym (Fleet Command; Cruiser; Uncommon)
  - Oktyabrskaya Revolutsia (Flank Speed; Battleship; Rare)
  - Lend-Lease Hurricane Mk. II (Surface Action; Fighter; Common)
  - S-13 (Fleet Command; Submarine; Common)
  - Sovetsky Soyuz (Fleet Command; Battleship; Rare)

Kingdom of Sweden

  - HSwMS Göteborg (Fleet Command; Destroyer; Common)
  - HSwMS Gotland (Fleet Command; Seaplane Carrier; Uncommon)
  - HSwMS Gustav V (Fleet Command; Coastal Defense Ship; Rare)

United Kingdom

  - Beaufighter TF Mk. X (Task Force; Fighter; Uncommon)
  - Barracuda Mk. II (Task Force; Dive Bomber/Torpedo; Common)
  - Halifax Gr. Mk. V (Task Force; Heavy Bomber; Uncommon)
  - HMS Ajax (War at Sea; Cruiser; Uncommon)
  - HMS Ark Royal (War at Sea; Aircraft Carrier; Rare)
  - HMS Belfast (Flank Speed; Cruiser; Rare)
  - HMS Cossack (Condition Zebra; Destroyer; Common)
  - HMS Eagle (Surface Action; Aircraft Carrier; Rare)
  - HMS Euryalus (Fleet Command; Cruiser; Uncommon)
  - HMS Exeter (War at Sea; Cruiser; Rare)
  - HMS Fencer (Task Force; Escort Carrier; Uncommon)
  - HMS Glorious (Fleet Command; Aircraft Carrier; Rare)
  - HMS Halcyon (Surface Action; Minesweeper; Common)
  - HMS Hawkins (Surface Action; Cruiser; Rare)
  - HMS Hood (War at Sea; Battle Cruiser; Rare)
  - HMS Illustrious (Task Force; Aircraft Carrier; Rare)
  - HMS Jamaica (Task Force; Cruiser; Uncommon)
  - HMS Javelin (War at Sea; Destroyer; Common)
  - HMS Kent (Task Force; Cruiser; Rare)
  - HMS King George V (Task Force; Battleship; Rare)
  - HMS Nelson (Surface Action; Battleship; Rare)
  - HMS Prince of Wales (Flank Speed; Battleship; Rare)
  - HMS Repulse (Flank Speed; Battlecruiser; Rare)
  - HMS Rodney (War at Sea; Battleship; Rare)
  - HMS Royal Oak (Condition Zebra; Battleship; Rare)
  - HMS Saumarez (Flank Speed; Destroyer; Common)
  - HMS Sheffield (Surface Action; Cruiser; Uncommon)
  - HMS Swale (Fleet Command; Frigate; Common)
  - HMS Truculent (War at Sea; Submarine; Common)
  - HMS Victorious (Condition Zebra; Aircraft Carrier; Rare)
  - HMS Warspite (Task Force; Battleship; Rare)
  - Martlet Mk. II (Flank Speed; Fighter; Common)
  - Sea Hurricane Mk. IB (War at Sea; Fighter; Common)
  - Short Sunderland Mk. I (Condition Zebra; Patrol Bomber; Uncommon)
  - Swordfish Mk. I (Surface Action; Torpedo Plane; Common)
  - Swordfish Mk. II (War at Sea; Torpedo Plane; Common)
  - Vospers MTB Torpedo Boat (Surface Action; MTB Torpedo Boat; Common)

United States

  - B-24 Liberator (Condition Zebra; Patrol Bomber; Uncommon)
  - B-25H (Task Force; Bomber; Uncommon)
  - F4F Wildcat (War at Sea; Fighter; Common)
  - F4U-1A (Condition Zebra; Fighter; Common)
  - F4U-1D (Surface Action; Fighter; Common)
  - F6F-3 Hellcat (Task Force; Fighter; Common)
  - P-40E Warhawk (Fleet Command; Fighter; Common)
  - PBY Black Cat (Fleet Command; Reconnaissance; Uncommon)
  - LST (Surface Action; Auxiliary; Common)
  - PBY Catalina (War at Sea; Reconnaissance Plane; Uncommon)
  - PT Boat (War at Sea; PT Boat; Common)
  - SBD Dauntless (War at Sea; Dive Bomber; Common)
  - SB2C Helldiver (Flank Speed; Dive Bomber; Common)
  - SS American Victory (Surface Action; Transport; Uncommon)
  - SS Jeremiah O'Brien (War at Sea; Transport; Uncommon)
  - TBD Devastator (War at Sea; Torpedo Plane; Common)
  - TBF-1 Avenger (War at Sea Starter; Torpedo Plane; Common)
  - TBF Avenger (Task Force; Torpedo Plane; Common)
  - USS Alaska (Flank Speed; Battle Cruiser; Rare)
  - USS Allen M. Sumner (Condition Zebra; Destroyer; Common)
  - USS Archer-Fish (Task Force; Submarine; Common)
  - USS Arizona (Flank Speed; Battleship; Rare)
  - USS Atlanta (War at Sea; Cruiser; Uncommon)
  - USS Bagley (Fleet Command; Destroyer; Common)
  - USS Baltimore (War at Sea; Cruiser; Rare)
  - USS Barb (War at Sea; Submarine; Common)
  - USS Boise (War at Sea; Cruiser; Uncommon)
  - USS California (Task Force; Battleship; Rare)
  - USS Cleveland (Task Force; Cruiser; Uncommon)
  - USS Edsall (Surface Action; Destroyer; Common)
  - USS Enterprise (War at Sea; Aircraft Carrier; Rare)
  - USS Essex (Fleet Command; Aircraft Carrier; Rare)
  - USS Fletcher (War at Sea; Destroyer; Uncommon)
  - USS Guadalcanal (Surface Action;Aircraft Carrier;Uncommon)
  - USS Gunston Hall (Flank Speed; Auxiliary; Uncommon)
  - USS Hoel (Task Force; Destroyer; Common)
  - USS Hornet (Surface Action; Aircraft Carrier; Rare)
  - USS Houston (Condition Zebra; Cruiser; Rare)
  - USS Intrepid (Flank Speed; Aircraft Carrier; Rare)
  - USS Iowa (War at Sea; Battleship; Rare)
  - USS John C. Butler (Task Force; Destroyer-Escort; Common)
  - USS Kidd (Flank Speed; Destroyer; Common)
  - USS Laffey (Task Force; Destroyer; Common)
  - USS Lexington (Condition Zebra; Aircraft Carrier; Rare)
  - USS Massachusetts (Task Force; Battleship; Rare)
  - USS Missouri (Task Force; Battleship; Rare)
  - USS Montana (Surface Action; Battleship; Rare)
  - USS Montpelier (War at Sea Starter; Cruiser; Uncommon)
  - USS New Jersey (Surface Action; Battleship; Rare)
  - USS Nevada (Fleet Command; Battleship; Rare)
  - USS North Carolina (Flank Speed; Battleship; Rare)
  - USS Phelps (Flank Speed; Destroyer; Common)
  - USS Phoenix (Surface Action; Cruiser; Uncommon)
  - USS Princeton (War at Sea; Aircraft Carrier; Rare)
  - USS Quincy (Fleet Command; Cruiser; Rare)
  - USS Richmond (Flank Speed; Cruiser; Uncommon)
  - USS S-37 (Condition Zebra; Submarine; Common)
  - USS San Francisco (Task Force; Cruiser; Rare)
  - USS Salt Lake City (War at Sea; Cruiser; Rare)
  - USS Samuel B. Roberts (War at Sea; Destroyer Escort; Common)
  - USS San Diego (Flank Speed; Cruiser; Uncommon)
  - USS Saratoga (Task Force; Aircraft Carrier; Rare)
  - USS St. Lo (War at Sea; Escort Carrier; Uncommon)
  - USS Taylor (War at Sea Starter; Destroyer; Common)
  - USS Tennessee (War at Sea; Battleship; Rare)
  - USS Washington (War at Sea; Battleship; Rare)
  - USS Wasp (Surface Action; Aircraft Carrier; Rare)
  - USS West Virginia (Condition Zebra; Battleship; Rare)
  - USS Yorktown (Task Force; Aircraft Carrier; Rare)

Support Units

  - Heavy Shore Battery Installation (Surface Action; Shore Battery; Rare)
