= Phil Yates =

New Zealand board game designer

- Occupation: Game designer
- Employer: Battlefront Miniatures
- Known for: Wargames

Phil Yates is a New Zealand game designer who has worked primarily on board games.

Yates is known as the designer of Flames of War, a World War II tabletop miniatures wargame.

== Career ==
Phil Yates began playing wargames in the early 1970s and began designing games in the mid-1980s. Yates is the lead games designer for the New Zealand company Battlefront Miniatures, for whom he designed the Flames of War miniatures game. Yates posted the Flames of War rules online as a free download, and Battlefront published physical rulebooks as well. Yates has written or co-authored many Intelligence Handbooks and Battle and Campaign books for Flames of War. His designs include Flames of War: Open Fire! (2012), Flames of War: Tour of Duty (2013), and a fourth edition of the Flames of War game in 2017.
