= Micro armour =

Small military scale models

1:285 / 6 mm scale micro armour depicting M113s and Israeli infantry

Micro armour (or micro armor) refers to scale models made of lead, pewter, die cast metal or plastic, usually used for wargaming purposes. Variations of the name include: mini armour, microscale, mini tanks, miniature armour, miniature tanks, micro tanks, minitanks, minifigs, armour figurines, tank figurines, etc. are also used. Micro armour is a sub-category of model military vehicle miniature figures used for military simulation, miniature wargaming, scale models, dioramas and collecting.

== History ==
The specific term "micro armour" originated and was trademarked by GHQ founder Gregory Dean Scott in 1967 for a line of metal 1:285 scale armour miniatures. GHQ also published Micro Armour: The Game - WWII in 2001 some 34 years after founding the company. Early on, a competing company called C in C offered 1:285 scale micro armour starting in 1974.

Currently, games such as Flames of War and Axis & Allies Miniatures are widely popular and use 1:100 scale mini armour figurines and 15 mm infantry.

== Scale ==
Micro and mini armour consists primarily of the following scales, from smallest to largest:

overall scale	1:72 - 1:87	1:100 - 1:122	1:144 - 1:183 (also N scale)	1:285 - 1:300
figure scale	20 mm	15 mm	10 - 12.5 mm	6 mm
game scale	infantry & armour skirmish	infantry & armour skirmish	squad & armour skirmish	~platoon & armour skirmish

Beyond squad-level scale there is half-platoon scale, platoon scale, company scale, battalion scale and division scale.

=== Armour skirmish vs. infantry skirmish scale ===
Micro armour is usually differentiated from tabletop games based on human shaped heroic scale / infantry skirmish game scale figures (even if the high and low ends of each respective category overlap) because the scales used by most micro armour games are smaller (armour skirmish game scale) and the represented playing field larger - though it is not nearly as large as in naval wargaming. In typical micro armour based games (such as Micro Armour: The Game - WWII) a single tank would represent a typical military unit. Contrast to larger scaled games, such as those using 20 mm - 54 mm heroic scale / infantry skirmish game scale miniatures, (such as MechWarrior, Warhammer 40,000, Warhammer, AT-43, Warmachine or Dungeons & Dragons), a tank would be unusually large and more akin to units like dragons or large catapults which human sized units must gang-up against to defeat. Infantry skirmish games such as The Face of Battle and I Ain't Been Shot, Mum! demonstrate this very well as they are designed to be played with 15mm, 20mm and 25/28mm scale figures, as contrasted with 6mm - 12.5mm armour skirmish figures.

== Early games ==
Early (pre-1990) games using lead or pewter miniature armour (for World War II and modern battle simulation) included Angriff! by Z&M Publishing Enterprises (1968) and (1972), Fast Rules by Armored Operations Society (1970) published later by Guidon Games (1972), Tractics by Guidon Games (1971) later by TSR, Inc. (1975), War Games Rules Armour & Infantry 1925-1950 by Wargames Research Group (WRG) (1973), Panzer Warfare by TSR, Inc. (1975), Kampfgruppe by Historical Alternatives Game Co. (1979), Corps Commander: OMG & Korps Commander by Table Top Games (1986) and Command Decision by Game Designers' Workshop (1986).

There were also some science fiction-based games that used micro armour, such as Starguard by Reviresco (1974), Ogre by Steve Jackson Games (1977), Striker by Game Designers' Workshop (1981), Classic BattleTech by FASA (1984) and Space Marine by Games Workshop (1989).

== Recent games ==
Recent (1990 and later) games include Tide of Iron, Flames of War, Axis & Allies Miniatures, Micro Armour: The Game - WWII, Heavy Gear, Blitzkrieg Commander, Dirtside II, Crossfire, I Ain't Been Shot, Mum!, Cold War Commander, Megablitz, Panzer War, Panzertruppe Panzer Miniatures, Panzer Marsch, First Watch. Jagdpanzer, Command Decision - Test of Battle 4th Edition, World Tank Campaigns, BGMR Modern Rules.

== Manufacturers ==
=== Game pieces ===
Metal (and some plastic) gaming pieces are traditionally manufactured by companies such as:

- Armstrong Models (Now part of Heroics & Ros) (UK)
- C in C
- CGD (Hong Kong)
- DM Toys (Germany)
- Battlefront Miniatures Limited (1:100 scale)
- GFI (US)
- GHQ (US)
- Heroics & Ros
- Herpa/Roco/Preiser
- I-94 Enterprises
- In-Service Miniatures
- Irregular Miniatures
- Pendraken Miniatures (UK)
- Perrin Miniatures (distributed by Noble Miniatures in the US and Chariot Miniatures in the UK)
- QRF Models Ltd. (1:100 scale)
- SHQ Miniatures (1:76 scale/20 mm)
- Scotia Micro Models
- Skytrex
- Stevens International

=== Collectables ===
Recent plastic and diecast metal series intended for collecting and made in the 1:144 scale are manufactured by companies such as:

- ACI Toys Company Ltd. (Hong Kong)
- Dragon Models Limited (Hong Kong)
- Pegasus Hobbies (US)
- Takara Tomy (Japan)
- Trumpeter (China)
