= Axis & Allies Miniatures =

Miniature wargame

- Axis & Allies Miniatures Official Title/Logo
- Manufacturers: Hasbro
- Genres: World War II
- Systems: miniature wargaming

Axis & Allies Miniatures is a miniature wargaming system including both a rule set and a line of 1/100 scale miniature armor (15 mm figure scale) collectible miniatures. The game is set in the World War II era with units representing individual vehicles and artillery or squads of infantry. The system was first released in 2005 and was produced by Avalon Hill, a division of the game company Wizards of the Coast, which itself is a subsidiary of Hasbro.

Aimed at the collectible miniatures game market, the title Axis & Allies drew on that game's historic strength and notoriety. However, the miniature game bears little resemblance to the widely sold board games and other Axis & Allies items. Instead of a game of grand strategy, the miniatures game focuses on the tactical battle, with units fielded on either side of the battle being rarely greater than a company. Each piece is assigned a point value so that balanced matches can be constructed. Tournament play is typically done with 100 points per side, with infantry units usually having values of fewer than 10 points each and vehicles range from less than 10 to 50 or more based on relative strengths. Scenarios may alter these numbers or otherwise determine the constitution of each side. The map board consists of 2-or-3-inch (5.1 or 7.6 cm) hexes, with different terrain types represented within. Most set-ups are fewer than 20 hexes in either dimension. Combat resolution is done by rolling pools of standard six-sided dice.

Rule books are included in every starter set. For the Ground Sets, Expanded Rules were published separately. For the Naval Sets, Advanced Rules are available online.

The initial release included a broad range of units for Germany, the United Kingdom, and the United States, with a more limited set for Japan and the Soviet Union. Two units each were included of French and Italian forces. The second set added Nationalist China, Poland, and Romania to the mix, while the third set adds a single Australian unit. The fourth set debuted Canadian units, the fifth Hungarian units, the seventh Greek units, and the eighth Finnish units. The ninth introduced Slovak, Belgian and South African troops. The tenth introduced Croatian, Yugoslavian and New Zealand units.

== Ground Sets ==
Starter Sets

- Base Starter Set: Released in the fall of 2005, contained 12 randomly selected units, four double-sided battle mats, 10 six-sided dice, a rulebook, and a set checklist.
- Two-Player Starter Set: Contained 18 randomized units, 6 double-sided battle maps, and rulebook. Dice not included.
- 1939–1945 Two-Player Starter Set: Includes basic and advanced rule book, 10 pre-selected units (from 1939 to 1945 set), two double-sided maps, a rulebook, and eight dice.

Boosters

- Base Set: Basic set of 48 models, released in the fall of 2005
- Set II: Set of 45 models, released near the end of 2005. Introduces Nationalist China, Poland, and Romania units, as well as new elements such as snipers and paratroops
- Contested Skies: Set of 45 models (Set III), released on March 24, 2006. Features aircraft and air defenses as well as a single Australian unit
- D-Day: Set of 45 models (Set IV), released on June 6, 2006. Introduces obstacles as well as Canadian units
- Reserves: Set of 45 models (Set V), released on November 10, 2006. Introduces support and Hungarian units
- 1939–1945: Set of 60 models (Set VI), released on October 26, 2007. Mainly an "errata" expansion: recosted some units and changed others slightly. New scale for vehicles (15mm instead of 10mm).
- North Africa 1940–1943: Set of 60 models (Set VII), released on March 28, 2008. Added commander vehicles, trucks and added Greek units
- Eastern Front 1941–1945: Set of 60 models (Set VIII), released on December 16, 2008. Added Finnish units
- Early War 1939–1941: Set of 50 models (Set IX), released on December 15, 2009. Introduces units from Belgium, Slovakia and South Africa
- Counter Offensive 1941–1943: Set of 50 models (Set X), released on October 26, 2010. Introduces units from the Independent State of Croatia, New Zealand, and Yugoslav Partisans

Unreleased Sets

- Set XI-Late War 1944-1945: This set of 50 models, although never technically cancelled, has been postponed indefinitely.
- Italy and the Balkans 1943–1945: Canceled set of 60 models.

== Ground Rules ==
Axis & Allies uses fairly simple rules.
The players can get quickly familiarized with the Quick Start guide, and the complete Rulebook is available also.
The official website has an interactive demo.

== Ground Errata ==
The latest rules revisions, now available on the internet archive:

== Naval Sets ==
A sister series, Axis & Allies Naval Miniatures: War at Sea, was released around the time of the fifth series of miniatures. This game follows the same basic concept of collectible miniatures played on a paper map, using Six-sided dice to determine battle results. Like its predecessors, it features many historical figures that include aircraft, battleships, destroyers, and aircraft carriers to name a few. Each figure came with a stat card that tells you what each unit can do. They are though completely incompatible, a battleship being as long as two infantry.

== Air Sets ==
A second sister series, Axis & Allies Air Force Miniatures, was released on February 21, 2012 (its original release date was in October 2011). It focus on air combat, with scale models of fighter squadrons and bombers. The scale is 1/100 and the instruction manual has the unit statistics to make them compatible with ground forces games.

Two sets came out for this series: Angels Twenty and Bandits High, with each set containing 31 models.

== Scale sizes of miniatures ==
Originally, the Figure Scale for vehicles in the Ground Sets was variable (10-15mm). Because of players' and fans' complaints (and possibly for commercial reasons as well), Avalon Hill has been re-scaling vehicles to 15mm since the introduction of Set VI (1939–1945). However, there are still some slight variations between models (probably for technical reasons).

Infantry and Aircraft have always kept the same scale (15mm and 1/240 respectively), so those units from older sets (I to V) are "compatible" with newer sets (VI and on).

Ground Sets Scales
| Item | Rulebook | Actual |
|---|---|---|
| Soldier | 15mm (1/120) | ~1:100 |
| Vehicle | 15mm (1/120) | 1:120 and 1:100 |
| Aircraft | 1/240 | ?? |
| 2" hex | 100m (1:2000) | |
| 3" hex | 100m (1:1800) | |

Naval Sets Scales
| Item | Rulebook / Actual |
|---|---|
| Ships and Submarines | 1/1850 |
| Aircraft | 1/900 |

== Maps and Scenarios ==
Ground Set

- Base Starter Set: Four maps included: Able, Baker, Charlie, and Dog
- Two-Player Starter Set: Includes six double-sided maps
- Expanded Rules: Includes 8 new battle scenarios and two double-sided maps (5/6 and 7/8). Released on July 18, 2007
- 1939–1945 Starter: Includes two double-sided maps (1/2 and 3/4)
- North Africa 1940–1943 Map Guide: Set of three desert maps (D1, D2 and D3) and two scenarios. The overleaf of these maps is jungle terrain (F1, F2, and F3).
- Gazala 1942: Two desert maps (produced under license by Historic Battlefronts)
- Solomon Islands 1942: Two jungle maps. (Produced under licence by Historic Battlefronts)
- Eastern Front 1941–1945 Map Guide: Includes three Eastern Front maps and two scenarios. Released on December 16, 2008.
- Stalingrad 1942: Was to be released as 2 separate scale maps. One at 10mm the other at 100mm per hex. Release was supposed to have been January 2009 for the 10mm and April 2009 for the 100mm.

Hex Tiles

These were released in the now defunct Combat Zone-A store support to help foster the game with special maps, tiles and different colored minis.

- Set I-
- Set II-
- Set III-

== Reception ==
The Sun-Journal reviewed the Axis & Allies Miniatures base set and said that "This high‑quality skirmish game is playable right out of the box and [...] features faithful reproductions of real World War II combat vehicles and fighting units."

Writing for Armchair General, Tim McCormley admitted that "many people will be turned off on this game because it’s a 'collectible.'" However, he pointed out that "As collectible games go, this one doesn’t require a large investment." McCormley thought the quality of the miniatures was average, commenting, "The figures themselves are reasonable, basic plastic minis from China or wherever. The modeling is quite acceptable (for an amateur like me), but the paint job varies quite a bit." Although he enjoyed the mechanics of the game play, he warned "Make no mistake, this is a dicefest. You can minimize the odds, but you can’t control the odds. If you’re one of those people (like myself) that seem to have angered the 'Gods of Dice' for some arcane reason, you can end up getting creamed no matter how good your tactics are. But I often have fun even when I get slaughtered."

== Awards ==
At the 2006 Origins Awards, Axis and Allies Collectible Miniatures Game won in the category "Gamer's Choice Best Historical Game of 2005."

== List of Units ==
Australia

  - Australian Officer (North Africa; Commander; Uncommon)
  - Carro Armato M11/39 (Early War 1939–41; Tank; Uncommon)
  - Lend Lease Stuart (Counter Offensive; Tank; Uncommon)
  - Owen SMG (North Africa; Infantry; Uncommon)
  - Veteran SMLE Riflemen (Contested Skies; Infantry; Common)

Belgium

  - Belgium Bicycle Troop (Early War 1939–41; Infantry; Uncommon)
  - Belgium Infantry (Early War 1939–41; Infantry; Common)
  - Belgium Officer (Early War 1939–41; Commander; Uncommon)
  - T-13B3 (Early War 1939–41; Tank Destroyer; Rare)

Canada

  - Canadian infantrymen (D-Day and 1939–1945; Infantry; Common)
  - Churchill III (Counter Offensive; Tank; Rare)
  - Eagle-Eyed NCO (D-Day and 1939–1945; Commander; Uncommon)
  - Entrenched Antitank gun (Reserves; Artillery; Common)
  - Intrepid Hero (Reserves; Hero; Uncommon)
  - Ram Kangaroo (Eastern Front; Armored Personnel Carrier; Rare)
  - Sherman DD (D-Day; Tank; Rare)
  - Sherman VC 17-Pounder (1939–1945; Tank; Rare)

Nationalist China

  - Kuomintang Machine-Gun Team (Set II; Machine-Gun Team; Uncommon)
  - Kuomintang Officer (Set II; Commander; Uncommon)
  - Kuomintang Riflemen (Set II; Infantry; Common)
  - T-26 Series 1933 (Set II; Tank; Rare)

Independent State of Croatia

  - Croat Infantry (Counter Offensive; Infantry; Common)

Finland

  - Finnish Infantry (Eastern Front; Infantry; Common)
  - Finnish Machine-Gun Team (Eastern Front; Machine-Gun Team; Uncommon)
  - Finnish Officer (Eastern Front; Commander; Uncommon)
  - Finnish Ski Troop (Early War 1939–41; Infantry; Common)
  - StuG III Ausf. G (Eastern Front; Tank Destroyer; Rare)
  - T-26E (Early War 1939–41; Tank; Rare)

France

  - Bold Captain (Contested Skies; Commander; Uncommon)
  - Canon de 75 modele 1897 (Early War 1939–41; Artillery; Common)
  - Char B1-bis (Contested Skies and 1939–1945; Tank; Rare)
  - FCM 36 (Early War 1939–41; Tank; Rare)
  - Free French Infantrymen (D-Day; Infantry; Common)
  - French Alpine Troop (North Africa; Infantry; Uncommon)
  - French Resistance Fighters (Reserves; Partisan; Common)
  - Hotchkiss H39 (Eastern Front; Tank; Rare)
  - Hotchkiss Machine-Gun Team (Eastern Front; Machine-Gun Team; Uncommon)
  - Lebel 86M93 Grenadier (Contested Skies; Infantry; Common)
  - MAS 7.5 mm Rifle (Base Set and 1939–1945; Infantry; Common)
  - Morane-Saulnier MS.406 (Early War 1939–41; Aircraft; Rare)
  - P107 Half-Track (Early War 1939–41; Half-Track; Uncommon)
  - Panhard et Levassor P 178 (Reserves and 1939–1945; Armored Car; Uncommon)
  - Renault R-35 (Base Set and 1939–1945; Tank; Rare and Uncommon)
  - Somua S-35 (D-Day, 1939–1945 and Early War 1939–41; Tank; Rare)

Germany

  - 20mm Flak 38 (Contested Skies; Anti-aircraft Gun; Uncommon)
  - 7.5 cm LEL G1818 (North Africa; Artillery; Common)
  - 88mm Flak 36 (D-Day and North Africa; Anti-aircraft Gun; Rare)
  - 88mm with Gun Shield (Eastern Front; Anti-aircraft Gun; Rare)
  - BMW R75 (Contested Skies; Motorcycle; Uncommon)
  - DAK Infantry (Counter Offensive; Infantry; Common)
  - Disciplined Spotter (D-Day; Spotter; Common)
  - Dornier Do335 (Reserves; Aircraft; Rare)
  - Elefant (Reserves; Tank Destroyer; Rare)
  - Elite Panzer IV Ausf. D (Contested Skies; Tank; Uncommon)
  - Elite Stug III Ausf. G (Counter Offensive; Tank Destroyer; Rare)
  - Fallschirmjäger (Reserves; Paratrooper; Common)
  - Flakpanzer IV Wirbelwind (Contested Skies; Anti-aircraft Vehicle; Rare)
  - Flammenwerfer 35 (Eastern Front; Flamethrower; Uncommon)
  - Focke-Wulf Fw 190A (D-Day; Aircraft; Rare)
  - Fortress Defender (D-Day; Infantry; Common)
  - Grizzled Veteran (D-Day; Hero; Uncommon)
  - Hummel (Eastern Front; Artillery; Rare)
  - Jagdpanther (Base Set and 1939–1945; Tank Destroyer; Rare)
  - Jagdpanzer IV/48 (Contested Skies; Tank Destroyer; Rare)
  - Jagdpanzer IV/70 (Eastern Front; Tank Destroyer; Rare)
  - Jagdpanzer 38(t) Hetzer (D-Day; Tank Destroyer; Uncommon)
  - Jagdtiger (D-Day; Tank Destroyer; Rare)
  - Junkers JU 87B Stuka (Early War 1939–41; Aircraft; Rare)
  - Junkers JU 87G Stuka (Contested Skies and 1939–1945; Aircraft; Rare)
  - King Tiger (Set II, 1939–1945 and Eastern Front; Tank; Rare)
  - Kubelwagen V (North Africa and Early War 1939–41; Transport; Uncommon)
  - Luftwaffe Infantrymen (Contested Skies; Infantry; Common)
  - Light Mortar (Base Set; Mortar; Common)
  - Marder II (D-Day; Tank Destroyer; Uncommon)
  - Marder III Ausf. M (Eastern Front; Tank Destroyer; Uncommon)
  - Mauser Kar 98k (Base Set and 1939–1945; Infantry; Common)
  - Messerschmitt Ace (North Africa; Aircraft; Rare)
  - Messerschmitt Bf 109E (Contested Skies; Aircraft; Rare)
  - Messerschmitt Bf 110 (D-Day and North Africa; Aircraft; Rare)
  - Messerschmitt Me 262 (Reserves; Jet Aircraft; Rare)
  - MG 34 Machine-Gun Team (Counter Offensive; Machine-Gun Team; Uncommon)
  - MG 42 Machine-Gun Team (Base Set, 1939–1945 and North Africa; Machine-Gun Team; Uncommon)
  - Motorized Schützen Infantry (Early War 1939–41; Infantry; Common)
  - Nashorn (Set II and Counter Offensive; Tank Destroyer; Rare)
  - Nebelwerfer 41 (Reserves and Eastern Front; Artillery; Uncommon)
  - Opel Blitz 3Ton (North Africa; Truck; Uncommon)
  - PaK 35/36 Antitank Gun (Eastern Front; Artillery; Common)
  - PaK 38 Antitank Gun (Base Set; Artillery; Common)
  - PaK 40 Antitank Gun (Set II; Artillery; Uncommon)
  - Panther Ausf. D (Reserves; Tank; Rare)
  - Panther Ausf. A (Eastern Front; Tank; Rare)
  - Panzer IB (Early War 1939–41; Tank; Uncommon)
  - Panzer II Ausf. C (Base Set; Tank; Rare)
  - Panzer II Ausf. F (Eastern Front and Early War 1939–41; Tank; Uncommon)
  - Panzer II (F) "Flamingo" (Set II; Tank; Uncommon)
  - Panzer III Ausf. F (Set II, 1939–1945 and Early War 1939–41; Tank; Uncommon, Rare and Rare)
  - Panzer III Ausf. N Commander (Counter Offensive; Tank; Rare)
  - Panzer IV Ausf. A (Early War 1939–41; Tank; Rare)
  - Panzer IV Ausf. E (North Africa and Eastern Front; Tank; Rare and Uncommon)
  - Panzer IV Ausf. F2 (1939–1945; Tank; Uncommon)
  - Panzer IV Ausf. G (Early) (Eastern Front and Counter Offensive; Tank; Rare)
  - Panzer IV Ausf. G (Base Set; Tank; Uncommon)
  - Panzer IV Ausf. H Commander (North Africa; Tank Commander; Rare)
  - PzKpfw 38(t) (Reserves; Tank; uncommon)
  - Panzerjäger I (Early War 1939–41; Tank Destroyer; Uncommon)
  - Panzerjäger Bren 731 (e) (Reserves; Anti-Tank Vehicle; Uncommon)
  - Panzerfaust 30 (Base Set and 1939–1945; Infantry Antitank Team; Common)
  - Panzergrenadier (Set II; Infantry; Common)
  - Panzerschreck (Contested Skies; Antitank Team; Common)
  - Panzerspähwagen P204 (F) (North Africa; Armored Car; Uncommon)
  - Pioneers (Eastern Front; Engineer; Uncommon)
  - Recon BMW R75 (Counter Offensive; Motorcycle; Uncommon)
  - Sandbagged Machine-Gun Team (D-Day; Machine-Gun Team; Uncommon)
  - Sd Kfz 222 (Base Set; Armored Car; Uncommon)
  - Sd Kfz 234/2 "Puma" (Contested Skies; Armored Car; Uncommon)
  - Sd.Kfz. 2 Motorcycle Half-Track (North Africa and Early War 1939–41; Motor-Cycle Half-Track; Uncommon)
  - Sd.Kfz. 7/1 (North Africa; Anti-Aircraft; Rare)
  - Sd.Kfz. 231 (North Africa and Early War 1939–41; Armored Car; Uncommon)
  - Sd.Kfz. 234/4 (Eastern Front; Tank Destroyer; Rare)
  - Sd.Kfz. 250 (D-Day; Half-Track; Uncommon)
  - Sd.Kfz. 251 (Base Set, 1939–1945 and North Africa; Half-Track; Uncommon)
  - Sd Kfz 303 "Goliath" (Reserves; Demolitions; Uncommon)
  - sGrW 34 81mm Mortar (D-Day and Eastern Front; Mortar; Uncommon)
  - sIG 33 (Base Set; Assault Gun; Rare)
  - SS-Haupsturmführer (Base Set and 1939–1945; Commander; Uncommon)
  - SS-Jagdpanther (Eastern Front; Tank Destroyer; Rare)
  - SS-Panther Ausf. G (Base Set; Tank; Rare)
  - SS-Panzer IV Ausf. F2 (Set II; Tank; Rare)
  - SS-Panzergrenadier (Base Set and Eastern Front; Infantry; Common)
  - SS Stormtroopers (Contested Skies; Infantry; Common)
  - StuG III Ausf. D (Contested Skies and 1939–1945; Assault Gun; Uncommon)
  - StuG III Ausf. G (North Africa; Tank Destroyer; Rare)
  - Sturmpanzer IV "Brummbär" (Set II and 1939–1945; Assault Gun; Rare)
  - Tiger I (Base Set, 1939–1945 and Eastern Front; Tank; Rare)
  - Veteran Fallschirmjäger (North Africa and Counter Offensive; Paratrooper; Uncommon)
  - Veteran Panzer III Ausf. L (North Africa; Tank; Rare)
  - Veteran Tiger (D-Day and North Africa; Tank; Rare)
  - Volkssturm Infantrymen (Reserves; Infantry; Common)
  - Wehrmacht Expert Sniper (Set II; Sniper; Uncommon)
  - Wehrmacht Oberleutnant (Set II and Eastern Front; Commander; Uncommon)
  - Wehrmacht Veteran Infantrymen (D-Day and North Africa; Infantry; Common)
  - Werwolf Partisans (Reserves; Partisan; Common)
  - Wespe (North Africa; Artillery; Rare)

Greece

  - Greek Cavalry (Early War 1939–41; Cavalry; Uncommon)
  - Greek Mountain Infantry (Counter Offensive; Infantry; Common)
  - Greek Officer (North Africa; Commander; Uncommon)
  - Greek Soldier (North Africa; Infantry; Common)

Hungary

  - 8mm Huzagol 35M (Reserves and Eastern Front; Infantry; Common)
  - 37mm Light Antitank Gun (Reserves; Anti-Tank Gun; Common)
  - PzKpfw 38 (t) (Eastern Front; Tank; Rare)
  - Solthurn 31m MG Team (Counter Offensive; Machine-Gun Team; Uncommon)
  - Tenacious Officer (Reserves; Commander; Uncommon)
  - 38M Toldi IIA (Counter Offensive; Tank; Rare)
  - Turan I (Reserves; Tank; Uncommon)
  - 40/43M Zrinyi Assault Howitzer (Counter Offensive; Assault Gun; Rare)

Italy

  - 47/32 Anti-Tank Gun (North Africa; Artillery; Common)
  - Autoblindo AB41 (North Africa and Early War 1939–41; Armored Car; Uncommon)
  - Blackshirts (Set II; Infantry; Common)
  - Breda Modello 30 LMG (North Africa; Infantry; Uncommon)
  - Breda Modello 37 (North Africa; Machine-Gun Team; Uncommon)
  - Brixia M35 45 mm Mortar (Contested Skies and Eastern Front; Artillery; Uncommon)
  - Cannone da 75/27 modello 11 (Early War 1939–41; Artillery; Common)
  - Carro Armato M11/39 (North Africa; Tank; Uncommon)
  - Carro Armato M13/40 (Base Set and 1939–1945; Tank; Rare and Uncommon)
  - Fucile Modello 1891 (Base Set and 1939–1945; Infantry; Common)
  - Italian Alpine Troop (North Africa; Infantry; Uncommon)
  - Italian Conscript (North Africa; Infantry; Common)
  - L3/35 (D-Day; Light Tank; Uncommon)
  - L6/40 (Eastern Front; Tank; Uncommon)
  - Macchi C.202 Folgore (North Africa; Aircraft; Rare)
  - Semovente L40 da 47/32 (Early War 1939–41; Assault Gun; Rare)
  - Semovente 75/18 (North Africa; Tank Destroyer; Rare)
  - Semovente 90/53 (North Africa; Tank Destroyer; Rare)
  - Stalwart Hero (Reserves; Hero; Uncommon)
  - Stalwart Lieutenant (Contested Skies and 1939–1945; Commander; Uncommon)
  - Veteran Carro Armato M13/40 (Eastern Front; Tank; Rare)

Japan

  - 47mm Anti-Tank Gun (Base Set; Anti-Tank Gun; Uncommon)
  - 70mm Type 92 (North Africa; Artillery; Uncommon)
  - Arisaka Rifle (Base Set and 1939–1945; Infantry; Common)
  - Azad Hind Fauj Infantrymen (Reserves; Infantry; Common)
  - Honor-Bound Hero (D-Day; Hero; Uncommon)
  - Imperial Engineer (Counter Offensive; Engineer; Uncommon)
  - Imperial Sergeant (Base Set; Commander; Uncommon)
  - Imperial Sniper (Set II; Sniper; Common)
  - Japanese Bicycle Trooper (Early War 1939–41; Infantry; Uncommon)
  - Jungle Spotter (Early War 1939–41; Spotter; Uncommon)
  - Kawanishi N1K-J "Shiden-Kai" (Reserves and Counter Offensive; Aircraft; Rare)
  - Mitsubishi A6M "Zero" (Contested Skies and 1939–1945; Aircraft; Rare)
  - Nakajima Ki-43 Oscar (Early War 1939–41; Aircraft; Rare)
  - SNLF Captain (Set II and 1939–1945; Commander; Uncommon)
  - SNLF Fanatics (Contested Skies; Infantry; Uncommon)
  - SNLF Paratroopers (Set II; Paratrooper; Common)
  - Type 1 Ho-Ni (Set II; Tank Destroyer; Rare)
  - Type 2 Ka-Mi Amphibious Tank (Set II; Tank; Uncommon)
  - Type 3 Chi-Nu (Reserves; Tank; Rare)
  - Type 4 Ho-Ro (Counter Offensive; Assault Gun; Rare)
  - Type 87 Armored Car (Contested Skies; Armored Car; Uncommon)
  - Type 88 75 mm AA Gun (Counter Offensive; Anti-aircraft; Rare)
  - Type 89A Chi-Ro (Contested Skies; Tank; Rare)
  - Type 89B Chi-Ro (Early War 1939–41; Tank; Rare)
  - Type 89 Mortar (Base Set and 1939–1945; Mortar; Common)
  - Type 92 Machine-Gun Team (Base Set and 1939–1945; Machine-Gun Team; Uncommon)
  - Type 95 Ha-Go (Base Set and 1939–1945, Counter Offensive; Tank; Rare and Uncommon)
  - Type 97 Antitank Rifle (Reserves; Soldier; Common)
  - Type 97 Chi-Ha (Set II and 1939–1945; Tank; Rare)
  - Type 97 Te-Ke Tankette (Set II; Tank; Uncommon)
  - Type 99 LMG (Early War 1939–41; Infantry; Common)

New Zealand

  - Daimler Dingo Armored Car (Counter Offensive; Armored Car; Uncommon)
  - New Zealand Commander (Counter Offensive; Commander; Uncommon)
  - New Zealand Infantry (Counter Offensive; Infantry; Common)

Poland

  - 7TP (Early War 1939–41; Tank; Rare)
  - 7TPdw (Set II; Tank; Rare)
  - Cavalrymen (Set II; Cavalry; Uncommon)
  - Cromwell IV (Counter Offensive; Tank; Rare)
  - Determined Infantrymen (Reserves; Infantry; Common)
  - Polish Mauser Kar 98 K (Reserves; Infantry; Common)
  - Polish Officer (Early War 1939–41; Commander; Uncommon)
  - TKS Ursus Tankette (Early War 1939–41; Tank; Uncommon)
  - wz.36mm ATG (Early War 1939–41; Artillery; Common)

Romania

  - Antitank Grenadier (Set II and Eastern Front; Infantry; Common)
  - Bohler 47 mm Antitank Gun (Contested Skies; Artillery; Uncommon)
  - R-2 LT-35 (Set II; Tank; Rare)
  - T4 Medium Tank (Eastern Front; Tank; Rare)
  - R35 (Eastern Front; Tank; Uncommon)
  - Romanian Cavalry (Counter Offensive; Cavalry; Uncommon)
  - Romanian Infantry (Eastern Front; Infantry; Common)
  - Romanian Mortar (Counter Offensive; Mortar; Uncommon)
  - Romanian Sd.Kfz. 251 (Counter Offensive; Half-Track; Uncommon)
  - Vigilant Lieutenant (Contested Skies and Eastern Front; Commander; Uncommon)

South Africa

  - Marmon Herrington Mk. II AC (Early War 1939–41; Armored Car; Rare)
  - South African Infantry (Early War 1939–41; Infantry; Common)
  - Valentine II (Early War 1939–41; Tank; Rare)

Slovak Republic (1939–1945)

  - Motorcycle Recon (Early War 1939–41; Motorcycle; Uncommon)
  - PzKpfw 35(t) (Counter Offensive; Tank; Uncommon)
  - Panzer 38(t) (Early War 1939–41; Tank; Rare)
  - Slovak Infantry (Counter Offensive; Infantry; Common)
  - Slovak Marder III (Counter Offensive; Tank Destroyer; Uncommon)

Soviet Union

  - 76mm Model 1942 (Eastern Front; Artillery; Uncommon)
  - 82mm PM-37 Mortar (Contested Skies and 1939–1945; Mortar; Common)
  - 85mm AA Gun (Counter Offensive; Anti-aircraft Gun; Rare)
  - BA-10M (Reserves; Armored Car; Uncommon)
  - BA-64 (Eastern Front and Counter Offensive; Armored Car; Uncommon)
  - BM-13 Katyusha Rocket Launcher (Contested Skies; Artillery; Rare)
  - BT-5 (Early War 1939–41; Tank; Rare)
  - BT-7 (Reserves; Tank; Rare)
  - Commissar (Base Set and 1939–1945; Commander; Uncommon)
  - Communist Partisans (Contested Skies; Partisan; Common)
  - Cossack Captain (Set II; Commander; Uncommon)
  - Cossack Cavalrymen (Contested Skies; Cavalry; Uncommon)
  - Degtyarev DP27 (Reserves; Infantry; Common)
  - Fanatical Sniper (Set II and Eastern Front; Sniper; Common)
  - Guards Infantry (Counter Offensive; Infantry; Common)
  - Guards T-34/76 (Counter Offensive; Tank; Rare)
  - Guards T-34/85 (Set II; Tank; Rare)
  - Hero of the Soviet Union (D-Day; Hero; Uncommon)
  - IL-10 Sturmovik (Contested Skies and 1939–1945; Aircraft; Rare)
  - IS-2 Model 1944 (Set II and 1939–1945; Tank; Rare)
  - IS-2 Veteran (Eastern Front; Tank; Rare)
  - IS-3 (Reserves; Tank; Rare)
  - ISU-122 (Eastern Front; Assault Gun; Rare)
  - KV-1 (Base Set and 1939–1945; Tank; Rare)
  - KV-2 (Counter Offensive; Tank; Rare)
  - KV-85 (Eastern Front; Tank; Rare)
  - Lend-Lease Half Track (Eastern Front; Half-Track; Uncommon)
  - Russian M1910 Maxim MG (North Africa; Machine-Gun Team; Uncommon)
  - Mig-1 (Early War 1939–41; Aircraft; Rare)
  - Mongolian Cavalry (Early War 1939–41; Cavalry; Uncommon)
  - Mosin–Nagant 1891/30 (Base Set and 1939–1945; Infantry; Common)
  - PolishSU-85 (Counter Offensive; Tank Destroyer; Rare)
  - PPSh-41 SMG (Set II and Eastern Front; Infantry; Common)
  - PTRD-41 Antitank Rifle (Set II and Eastern Front; Antitank; Uncommon)
  - Red Army Forward Observer (Contested Skies; Artillery Observer; Common)
  - Siberian Shock Troops (Counter Offensive; Infantry; Uncommon)
  - Soviet Conscript (Early War 1939–41; Infantry; Common)
  - Soviet Grenadiers (Contested Skies; Infantry; Common)
  - Soviet M3 Lee (Reserves; Tank; Rare)
  - Soviet-Polish Infantry (Eastern Front; Infantry; Common)
  - SU-76M (D-Day; Tank Destroyer; Uncommon)
  - Su-85 (Contested Skies and 1939–1945; Tank Destroyer; Rare)
  - SU-122 (North Africa; Assault Gun; Rare)
  - SU-152 (Reserves; Assault Gun; Rare)
  - T26B (1939–1945; Tank; Rare)
  - T-28 (Early War 1939–41; Tank; Rare)
  - T-34/76 (Base Set and 1939–1945; Tank; Rare and Uncommon)
  - T-34/76 Commander (North Africa; Tank Commander; Rare)
  - T-34/76 Model 1942 (Eastern Front; Tank; Rare)
  - T-34/85 (Eastern Front; Tank; Rare)
  - T-35 (Reserves; Tank; Rare)
  - T-38 Light Amphibious Tank (Early War 1939–41; Tank; Uncommon)
  - T-70 Model 1942 (Set II, 1939–1945 and Eastern Front; Tank; Uncommon)
  - Valentine VI (Eastern Front; Tank; Uncommon)
  - Veteran NCO (Eastern Front; Commander; Uncommon)
  - Veteran SU-76M (Counter Offensive; Tank Destroyer; Rare)
  - ZIS-2 57mm Model 1943 (Set II and 1939–1945; Anti-tank Gun; Uncommon)
  - Zis-5 Ton (North Africa; Truck; Uncommon)
  - ZIS-42 Half-Track (Counter Offensive; Half-Track; Uncommon)

United Kingdom

  - 3-Inch Mortar (Counter Offensive; Mortar; Uncommon)
  - 2-Pounder Antitank Gun (North Africa; Antitank Gun; Common)
  - 6-Pounder Antitank Gun (Base Set; Antitank Gun; Common)
  - 17-Pounder Antitank Gun (Contested Skies; Antitank Gun; Uncommon)
  - 40 mm Bofors L60 (Contested Skies; Anti-aircraft Gun; Uncommon)
  - Archer (Set II; Tank Destroyer; Uncommon)
  - Bedford QL 3 Ton (North Africa; Truck; Rare)
  - Bren Machine Gunner (D-Day and North Africa; Infantry; Common)
  - BEF Infantrymen (Early War 1939–41; Infantry; Common)
  - Centurion A41 (Reserves; Tank; Rare)
  - Churchill IV (Eastern Front; Tank; Rare)
  - Churchill AVRE (D-Day; Engineer Tank; Rare)
  - Churchill Crocodile (Base Set; Tank; Rare)
  - Comet A-34 (Contested Skies; Tank; Rare)
  - Concealed Forward Observer (D-Day; Spotter; Common)
  - Cromwell IV (Set II and 1939–1945; Tank; Rare)
  - Crusader II (Base Set and North Africa; Tank; Rare)
  - Cruiser Mk IIIA13 (Early War 1939–41; Tank; Rare)
  - Defiant Paratroopers (D-Day; Paratrooper; Common)
  - Entrenched Antitank Gun (Eastern Front; Antitank Gun; Common)
  - Gloster Meteor (Reserves; Jet Aircraft; Rare)
  - Grant I (North Africa; Tank; Rare)
  - Gurkha Riflemen (Contested Skies; Infantry; Common)
  - Hawker Typhoon (D-Day; Aircraft; Rare)
  - Humber Scout Car (Base Set and 1939–1945; Armored Car; Uncommon)
  - Inspiring Hero (D-Day; Hero; Uncommon)
  - Inspiring Lieutenant (Base Set and 1939–1945; Commander; Uncommon)
  - M3 Stuart (Base Set and North Africa; Tank; Uncommon)
  - M22 Locust (Reserves; Tank; Uncommon)
  - Mk.VII Tetrarch (D-Day; Tank; Uncommon)
  - Matilda II (North Africa and Early War 1939–1941; Tank; Rare)
  - Morris Reconnaissance Car Mk2 (North Africa and Early War 1939–41; Armored Car; Uncommon)
  - PIAT Gunner (Set II; Anti-Tank Team; Uncommon)
  - Royal Engineers (Base Set; Engineer; Common)
  - Sherman IVC (Counter Offensive; Tank; Rare)
  - Sherman VC Firefly (D-Day and Eastern Front; Tank; Rare)
  - SMLE No.4 Rifle (Base Set and 1939–1945; Infantry; Common)
  - Staghound (Eastern Front; Armored Car; Uncommon)
  - Sten Gun (North Africa; Infantry; Common)
  - Spitfire Ace (North Africa; Aircraft; Rare)
  - Supermarine Spitfire Mk.I (D-Day and 1939–1945; Aircraft; Rare)
  - Universal Carrier (Contested Skies and Counter Offensive; Transport; Uncommon)
  - Valentine I (1939–1945; Tank; Rare)
  - Valentine II (Set II; Tank; Rare)
  - Vickers Machine-Gun Team (Base Set and 1939–1945; Machine-Gun Team; Uncommon)

United States

  - 3" Gun M5 (Set II; Antitank Gun; Uncommon)
  - 37mm Gun M3 (North Africa; Antitank Gun; Common)
  - BAR Gunner (Set II; Infantry; Common)
  - Bazooka (Base Set and 1939–1945; Antitank Team; Common)
  - Buffalo Soldiers (D-Day; Infantry; Common)
  - GMC CCKW (North Africa; Truck; Uncommon)
  - DUKW (Counter Offensive; Transport; Uncommon)
  - Early M4A1 Sherman (North Africa; Tank; Rare)
  - FO Jeep (Contested Skies; Artillery Observation vehicle; Uncommon)
  - Higgins Boat (D-Day; Transport; Rare)
  - Hunting Sniper (Contested Skies; Sniper; Uncommon)
  - Jeep (Base Set and Eastern Front; Transport; Common)
  - F4U Corsair (Reserves and Counter Offensive; Aircraft; Rare)
  - Lockheed P-38G Lightning (D-Day; Aircraft; Rare)
  - LVT (D-Day; Amphibious Transport; Rare)
  - LVT (A)-1 (Counteroffensive; Amphibious Tank; Rare)
  - M1 81mm Mortar (D-Day; Mortar; Common)
  - M1 Garand Rifle (Base Set and 1939–1945; Infantry; Common)
  - M3 Half-Track (D-Day; Half-Track; Uncommon)
  - M3 Light Tank (1939–1945; Tank; Rare)
  - M3 Lee (Base Set; Tank; Rare)
  - M3A1 Scout Car (Counter Offensive; Armored Car; Uncommon)
  - M3A5 Lee (Eastern Front; Tank; Rare)
  - M4A1 Sherman (Base Set and 1939–1945; Tank; Uncommon)
  - M4A1 Sherman Commander (North Africa; Tank Commander; Rare)
  - M4A3 (105) Sherman (Base Set and 1939–1945; Artillery; Rare)
  - M4A3E8 Sherman "Easy Eight" (Base Set; Tank; Rare)
  - M4 Sherman T-38 Calliope (Reserves; Tank; Rare)
  - M5A1 (Eastern Front; Tank; Uncommon)
  - M5 Half-Track (Set II, 1939–1945 and North Africa; Half-Track; Uncommon)
  - M7 105mm Priest (D-Day and Counter Offensive; SP Artillery; Rare)
  - M8 "Greyhound" (Reserves; Armored Car; Uncommon)
  - M16 Half-Track (D-Day; Half-Track; Uncommon)
  - M8 75mm Pack Howitzer (North Africa; Artillery; Common)
  - M10 (North Africa; Tank Destroyer; Rare)
  - M12 GMC (Eastern Front; Artillery; Rare)
  - M18 Hellcat (Base Set; Tank Destroyer; Rare)
  - M18 GMC (1939–1945; Tank Destroyer; Rare)
  - M20 Recoilless Rifle (Reserves; Artillery; Common)
  - M24 Chaffee (Set II; Tank; Rare)
  - M26 Pershing (Contested Skies and 1939–1945; Tank; Rare)
  - M36 MGC (Contested Skies; Tank Destroyer; Rare)
  - M1919 MG (North Africa; Machine-Gun Team; Uncommon)
  - Marine Riflemen (Contested Skies; Infantry; Common)
  - Marine Sergeant (Counter Offensive; Commander; Common)
  - Marines M2-2 Flamethrower (Base Set; Flamethrower; Common)
  - Mortar M2 (Base Set; Mortar; Common)
  - P-51D Mustang (Contested Skies and 1939–1945; Aircraft; Rare)
  - Quad 50 (Contested Skies and 1939–1945; Antiaircraft Gun; Uncommon)
  - P40 Tomahawk (North Africa; Aircraft; Rare)
  - Rangers (Reserves; Infantry; Common)
  - "Red Devil" Captain (Base Set and 1939–1945; Commander; Uncommon)
  - "Resourceful Hero" (D-Day; Hero; Uncommon)
  - "Screaming Eagle" Captain (Set II; Paratrooper Commander; Uncommon)
  - "Screaming Eagle" Paratroopers (Set II; Paratrooper; Common)
  - Thompson Sub-Machine Gun-Gunner (Reserves; Infantry; Common)
  - Untested Recruit (North Africa; Infantry; Common)
  - U.S. Engineer (Eastern Front; Engineer; Uncommon)
  - Veteran M4 Sherman "Rhino" (Set II; Tank; Rare)

Kingdom of Yugoslavia

  - Yugoslav Partisan Infantry (Counter Offensive; Infantry; Common)
  - Yugoslav Partisan Commander (Counter Offensive; Commander; Uncommon)

Obstacles and Support Units

  - Ammo Dump (Reserves; Support; Uncommon)
  - Barbed Wire (D-Day; Obstacle; Common)
  - FuelDepot (Reserves; Support; Uncommon)
  - Headquarters (Reserves; Support; Uncommon)
  - Minefield (D-Day; Obstacle; Common)
  - Pillbox (D-Day; Obstacle; Uncommon)
  - Tank Obstacle (D-Day; Obstacle; Common)
