= Flames of War =

World War II tabletop wargame

The World War II Miniatures Game
- Cover of 2nd Edition Rulebook
- Publishers: Battlefront Miniatures Ltd
- Publication: 2002
- Years active: 2002–present
- Genres: table top wargaming
- Players: 2–4
- Website: http://www.flamesofwar.com

Flames of War (abbreviated as FoW) is a World War II tabletop miniatures wargame produced by the New Zealand company Battlefront Miniatures Ltd. The 1st Edition set of rules was published in 2002.

Flames of War allows players to wargame company-level battles from the European, Pacific, and North African Theatres of World War II, using 1/100 scale miniatures (15 mm figure scale) and miniature armor. In the 1st Edition rulebook, basic army lists were provided for the mid-war period (1942–1943), while Battlefront published early (1939–1941) and late war (1944–1945) army lists on their website (subsequently these early and late war lists were removed). The 2nd Edition of the rulebook was published in 2006. The 3rd Edition was released on March 10, 2012. The 4th Edition was released in March 2017.

== Gameplay ==
The gameplay takes place over a series of turns, with players alternating movement, shooting, and close assault. The game is optimized for two players, although it can be played by a larger number of players playing against each other or grouped in teams.

The play revolves around company-level tactics, with each stand or element representing an infantry fireteam (half-squad/section), an artillery piece and its crew, or a single vehicle (such as a tank, jeep, or armored car). Air support is also available, in the form of fighter bombers (such as the Hawker Hurricane) and ground attack aircraft (such as the Ilyushin Il-2 "Shturmovik"), with aircraft generally being represented by 1:144 scale models.

The main rulebook has scenarios that players can use for their games, with all of these scenarios centered on capturing objectives. Additional army sourcebooks contain further scenarios, usually centered on historical events relevant to that particular book. Game play utilizes six-sided dice to pass various skill tests used to shoot at enemies or pass motivation-based tests. Movement distances and weapon ranges are provided in both inches and centimeters and are usually measured with tape measures or other measuring aides. Tokens are used to indicate pinned-down troops, bogged down vehicles, etc.

Current army sourcebooks are based on particular campaigns and include army lists for the German forces (such as Afrika Korps, Waffen SS and Luftwaffe ground troops), the U.S. Army (including Rangers and Airborne units), the armies of United Kingdom and Commonwealth (India, Australia, Canada, South Africa, and New Zealand), the Red Army of the Soviet Union, (including the Soviet 8ya Gvardeyskiy Strelkovy Korpus), the Italian army (including elite Bersaglieri and Paracadutisti, regular Fucilieri, and fascist Blackshirts paramilitaries), as well as nations that played as smaller role such as the Polish, Hungarians, Finnish, Romanians, as well as the Japanese and United States Marines for the Pacific Theatre campaign.

== Rules and sourcebooks ==
Battlefront divides World War II into three periods: early-war (1939–41), mid-war (1942–43) and late-war (1944–45). Each period has its own point values aimed at recreating actual battle situations that would have occurred during the respective time periods. Sourcebooks are compiled to represent forces from one of the time periods, some only cover specific battles (Blood, Guts, and Glory, Devil's Charge, etc.) while other books cover broad campaigns with lists that span multiple years (North Africa, Eastern Front, etc.).

=== Fourth Edition Rulebooks, Starter/Army box sets and Sourcebooks ===
- Flames of War – Rule Book V4, released in 2017, FW007 covers Mid-War period only.
- Flames of War – Rule Book V4, released in 2017, FW008 covers Early-War & Late-War period.

==== Early-War period Sourcebooks ====
- Blitzkrieg: Invasion of France, 1940, released in 2026.

==== Mid-War period Sourcebooks ====
- Desert Rats released in Feb 2017 covers North Africa British desert forces 1942–43, and was quickly superseded with the publication of Armored Fist.
- Afrika Korps released in Mar 2017 covers North African German desert forces 1942–43.
- Avanti released in Jan 2018 covers Italian North African desert forces 1942–43.
- Fighting First released in Dec 2017 covers U.S. Army forces in the North Africa desert Area 1942–43.
- Armored Fist released in April 2018, supersedes Desert Rats and like that covers North African desert British forces 1942–43.
- Iron Cross released in late 2018, covers German forces at the Battle of Stalingrad 1942–1943.
- Enemy at the Gates released in late 2018, covers Soviet forces 1942 though the Battle of Stalingrad 1942–1943.
- Red Banner released in early 2019, covers Soviet forces during the Battle of Kursk 1943.
- Ghost Panzers released in early 2019, covers German forces during the Battle of Kursk 1943.
- North Africa: Mid-War released in March 2022, includes all content from Armored Fist, Fighting First, Afrika Korp, Avanti, and mid-war Airborne forces.
- Eastern Front: Mid-war released in August 2022, includes all content from Iron Cross, Ghost Panzer, Red Banner, Enemy at the Gates, White Death, Hungarian Steel, and Brave Romania.
- D-Day: Forces in Normandy, 1944 released in 2024.
- The Pacific released in 2025.

==== Mid-War period Force Booklets ====
- All American released in November 2019, covers American Airborne and Rangers during mid-war campaigns 1942–1943.
- Death From Above released in November 2019, covers German and Italian Airborne forces during mid-war campaigns 1942–1943.
- Red Devils released in May 2020, covers British Airborne and Commando forces during mid-war campaigns 1942–1943.

==== Late-War period Source Books ====
- Armies Of Late War, released in early 2018, covers the US, German, British, and Soviet forces.
- Fortress Europe, released in May 2019 covering American, German, British and Soviet forces in a simple introductory manner with simple list of forces.
- D-Day American Forces In Normandy, released in May 2019 covering the Normandy Invasion, Operation Overlord, to the Breakout during Operation Cobra and on to the Fall of Brest and Paris in late August–September 1944.
- D-Day German Forces in Normandy, released in September 2019 covering the Defense of the Atlantic War in Normandy, the Defense of Saint Lo then the following Battle in Brittany.
- D-Day British Forces in Normandy, released in 2020 covering British and Commonwealth forces from the D-Day amphibious and airborne landings through to the Normandy Breakout.
- D-Day Waffen SS, released in August 2020 covering the quickly mobilized army of veteran-led conscripts to counter-attack the Allied invasion front in France in 1944.
- Bagration Soviet, released in September 2020 covering the events of Operation Bagration and the Soviet Army's offensive against Germany in Byelorussia on June 22, 1944.
- Bagration German, released in March 2021 covering the German forces fighting from Finland to Romania to repel the vicious Russian offensives from January 1944–45.
- Bulge American, released in November 2021 covering the American forces defending against the German Ardennes Counteroffensive from December 1944 to January 1945.
- Bulge German, released in May 2022 covering the German forces attacking through Ardennes from December 1944 to January 1945.
- Bulge British, released in October 2022 covering the British forces involved in Operation Market Garden through the Battle of the Bulge and the end of the war.
- Berlin Soviet, released in March 2023.
- Berlin German, released in April 2023.

=== Third Edition sourcebooks ===
==== Early-War period ====
- Barbarossa, released in Oct 2014 covers German forces invading the Soviet Union.
- Rising Sun covers the Soviet Union's early war operations in the Winter War against Finland, as well as their operations against the Japanese Empire during the Battles of Khalkhin Gol.

==== Late-War period ====
- Berlin, released in June 2015, covers Soviet forces during the Battle of Berlin.
- Nachtjager, which means 'Night Hunter', released in Dec 2012, covers The Battle For Northern Germany in the months of March – May 1945.
- The Battle of the Bulge, released in Sept 2016, covers Allied Forces on the German Border, Sep 1944 – Feb 1945 and The Ardennes Offensive: German Forces in Lorraine and the Ardennes, Sep 1944 – Feb 1945. It replaces Blood, Guts, and Glory, Devil's Charge and Nuts.
- The Ardennes Offensive, covers German Forces in Lorraine and the Ardennes, Sep 1944 – Feb 1945. It replaces Blood, Guts, and Glory, Devil's Charge and Nuts.
- Bulge, a compilation set released in Sept 2016, containing The Battle of the Bulge and The Ardennes Offensive in a special slip case.
- Blood, Guts and Glory, released in April 2012, covers the fighting in Alsace and Lorraine. Includes lists for American Tank, Tank Destroyer and Armored Infantry companies from September 1944 to the end of January 1945, as well as providing lists for the tanks and infantry of the Panzer Brigades that fought in this area.
- Devil's Charge, released in July 2012, covers the fighting by the 6th Panzer Army in the Battle of the Bulge. Includes lists for Kampfgruppe Peiper and Skorzeny's Panzer Brigade 150. For the American's it covers the infantry, engineers, light tank and cavalry companies that fought from September 1944 to the end of January 1945.
- Nuts!, released in October 2012, covers the fighting around Bastogne and Operation Nordwind. Includes lists for US Paratroopers, Airborne Engineers and Glider Infantry of the 101st Airborne Division, as well as Volksgrenadiers, Schwere Panzerjager Abteilung 653 (with Jagdtigers) and the troops of the 25th Panzergrenadier and 17th SS-Panzergrenadier divisions.
- Market Garden, released in February 2013, covers fighting by Allied Forces in Operation Market Garden. Includes lists for British, Polish and American Airborne forces and ground forces such as British 30th Armoured Corps. Also includes lists for Canadian forces that fought in the Battle of the Scheldt. It replaces A Bridge Too Far and Hell's Highway.
- Bridge by Bridge, released in February 2013, covers fighting by Axis Forces in Operation Market Garden. Includes German Fallschirmjäger, Wehrmacht and SS troops. It replaces A Bridge Too Far and Hell's Highway.
- Overlord, released in June 2013, covers the Allied invasion of Normandy. It replaces Turning Tide and Earth & Steel.
- Atlantik Wall, released in June 2013, covers the defense and counterattacks of France by German forces. It replaces Turning Tide and Earth & Steel.
- D-Day Overlord: Return to Normandy, compiles Atlantik Wall and Overlord books in a special slip case.
- Desperate Measures, released in December 2013 provides briefings and lists for the final Soviet push into Berlin.
- Fortress Italy, released in Dec 2014 covers German and Italian RSI fascist forces in Italy 1944–45. It replaces Dogs & Devils and Cassino. Contains the Hermann Göring Fallschirmpanzerdivision & troops defending the Gustav Line and Monte Cassino.
- Road To Rome, released in Dec 2014 covers Allied forces in Italy 1944–45. Contains British/Commonwealth, Polish, U.S. and French forces. It replaces Dogs & Devils and Cassino.
- Italy Compilation, contains Road To Rome and Fortress Italy.
- Bridge at Remagen, released in Jun 2014 covers the decisive battles in the Ruhr, Germany's industrial heartland and center-stage for the last major fights between US and German forces.
- Gung Ho, released in Apr 2016 covers US Marine Corps Pacific Forces, Saipan and Okinawa. It replaces Island Landing and Atoll Landings.
- Banzai, released in Apr 2016 covers Imperial Japanese Pacific Forces and four intelligence briefings. Special Rules: Battles Guadalcanal and Iwo Jima; Banzai Charge; Kendo; No Surrender; Seishien; Human Bullet; Banners; Regimental Standards; Hell By Day, Paradise By Night; and Envelopment.

=== Second Edition sourcebooks ===
==== Early-War period ====
- Blitzkrieg, covering the Invasion of Poland and the Fall of France, it includes Polish, French, British and German Lists.
- Hellfire and Back, covering the early war battles in North Africa, it includes English, German and Italian Lists.
- Burning Empires, a continuation of Early War battles in North Africa and Greece, it includes lists for Raiding Forces as well, including American one.
- Desert War: 1940–41, contains Hellfire and Back and Burning Empires books.

==== Mid-War period ====
- Ostfront, covering all the armies that fought on the Eastern Front, both Axis (including their allies such as the Hungarians, Finns and Romanians) and Allied forces. It is replaced by Eastern Front.
- Afrika covers the war in North Africa and Italy. This sourcebook includes both Axis and Allied forces, including their various allies.
- Mid-War Monsters covers various experimental armored fighting vehicles of World War II, including the M6 Heavy Tank, the Boarhound Armored Car, the Sturer Emil Self Propelled Anti-tank Gun, and the KV-5 Heavy Tank.
- North Africa updates and replaces the Afrika sourcebook. The specific organizations for the Deutsches Afrikakorps and Italian forces in Libya and Egypt have been included. Forces are split into North African, Tunisia, Sicily, and Italy briefings. New forces previously not found in Afrika, such as British Airborne or a Panzerspähwagenkompanie, are included.
- Eastern Front updates and replaces the Ostfront sourcebook similarly to the North Africa book. It was released on January 9, 2010.

==== Late-War period ====
- Festung Europa, army lists for German, US, British and Soviet infantry, motorized, reconnaissance, and armored forces.
- D Minus 1, army lists for the Allied paratroop and air-landing units active in the European theater during January–August 1944.
- D-Day, containing rules for the Normandy campaign, including beach landings, and fighting in the bocage.
- Bloody Omaha, army lists for German and US infantry divisions engaged in Operation Overlord on 6 June 1944.
- Villers-Bocage, army lists for German and British tank units fighting for control of the Normandy town of Villers-Bocage on 13 June 1944. Includes new heroes, new unit organizations, and new scenarios.
- Monty's Meatgrinder, army lists for German and British/Canadian forces fighting for Caen from June to August 1944. This book is the first to remove the number of support units limitation based on combat platoons.
- Cobra, the Normandy Breakout, army lists for SS and American troops fighting during Operation Cobra, the breakout from Normandy.
- Stalin's Onslaught, army lists for the initial assault in Operation Bagration focusing on the Soviet 8th Independent Penal Battalion, Soviet IS-2 heavy tank battalion and German 78. Sturmdivision. This is the first of three books to focus on Operation Bagration.
- Fortress Europe was released on 15 November 2008 and updates Festung Europa to make it consistent with the new style of army lists and includes options added by PDF.
- Hammer & Sickle, army lists for the drive on Minsk during Operation Bagration focusing on the Soviet Guards Divisions and German Sperrverband "Armoured Blocking Forces" and 505th German Tiger tank battalion. This is the second of three books to focus on Operation Bagration.
- Firestorm – Bagration, a Campaign box focused on Operation Bagration.
- River Of Heroes, the last in the Bagration cycle, and focuses on the 3rd and 5th SS Panzer divisions, and the Soviet Sapper battalions.
- Hell's Highway, the first book in the Market-Garden series, covering German Fallshirmjagers, the American 82nd and 101st Airborne Divisions and the British Guards Armoured Division.
- A Bridge too Far, the second and last book in the Market-Garden series, covering the battles for Oosterbeek and Arnhem.
- Firestorm – Market Garden, a Campaign box focused on Operation Market-Garden.
- Dogs and Devils, the first of two Italian front books, featuring the US 3rd Infantry Division, the 'Devil's Brigade', and the 1. Fallschirmpanzerdivision "Herman Goring".
- Stalin's Europe, army lists for the German, Soviet, Hungarian and Romanian troops involved in the Siege of Budapest, 1944–45.
- D-Day Slipcase, a case containing an expansion on many of the "Operation Overlord" source books. The box comprises: "Earth and Steel", containing a complement of German forces at the Atlantic Wall; and "Turning Tide", the allied army lists of the operation. These books supersede D minus 1, D-Day, Bloody Omaha, Villers Bocage, Monty's Meatgrinder and Cobra, the Normandy Breakout, updating all the lists in them and adding new lists.
- Cassino, released in June 2011, focusing on the battles around Monte Cassino.
- Earth and Steel
- Turning Tide
- Grey Wolf, released in December 2011, covering the Axis Forces fighting on the Eastern Front from 1944 to 1945. It replaces Stalin's Onslaught, Hammer and Sickle, River of Heroes and Stalin's Europe, updating all the lists in them and adding new lists.
- Red Bear, released in December 2011, covering the Allied Forces fighting on the Eastern Front from 1944 to 1945. It replaces Stalin's Onslaught, Hammer and Sickle, River of Heroes and Stalin's Europe, updating all the lists in them and adding new lists. Both Grey Wolf and Red Bear have been revised, and are current to 3rd edition rules.

=== First Edition sourcebooks ===
These books have been replaced with the sourcebooks listed above which reflect the 2nd, 3rd or current 4th Edition rules. All of these supplements below are now out of print. Battlefront provides updates on their website that detail the changes between these old sourcebooks (but not the first edition rulebook) and the new mid-war army lists provided in Afrika and Ostfront. With these changes, players may continue to use these (corrected) sourcebooks for tournament play in the mid-war period.

- First Edition Rulebook – German, US, Soviets, British, and Italian basic force lists.
- Diving Eagles – German Fallschirmjäger (paratrooper) lists. Battlefront released a second edition of this book in March 2006.
- Old Ironsides – US armor and armored infantry lists.
- Hitler's Fire Brigade – German armor and armored infantry lists for the Eastern Front. Two editions of this sourcebook were printed.
- Desert Rats – British armored squadrons and motor companies in the Mediterranean and North Africa.
- Desert Fox – German Afrika Korps panzer, motorized/armored infantry and reconnaissance companies.
- Stalingrad – Soviet and German infantry lists on the Eastern Front. Includes rules for street-fighting in an urban environment, as well as snipers.
- Stars & Stripes – US rifle infantry, Rangers, parachute infantry, tank, armored rifle and armored reconnaissance lists. All army lists from Old Ironsides are included in this sourcebook.
- For King and Country – British commonwealth forces such as Australian, New Zealand, Indian and Canadian forces.
- Avanti Savoia – Italian infantry, tank and motorized infantry forces.
- Za Stalina – Soviet armor and cavalry forces.

=== Web briefings ===
Battlefront publishes additional army lists on their web site. These lists are official Battlefront lists and are eligible to be played in many tournaments. Additionally, Battlefront will host "unofficial" briefings developed by fans, although such lists are generally not eligible for tournament play.

== Models and availability ==
Battlefront Miniatures is releasing at 15mm/ 1/100 scale, made up mostly of plastic models (some vehicles and figures remain in the original resin and white metal), for use in playing Flames of War. This includes models for ground forces, such as infantry, vehicles and field guns, along with a limited range of 1/144 model aircraft. The models are sold in blister packs and assorted boxed sets with 3–5 models each for vehicles and often up to 100 models for infantry boxes.

Other manufacturers, such as Plastic Soldier Company, produce 15mm figures for war gaming World War II, which can be used in addition to or instead of Battlefront's figures, in either private or tournament play. Battlefront allows the use of third party models even in officially run tournaments, which is rare among wargames companies that sell their own lines of models.

== Tournaments ==
Battlefront supports the tournament scene that revolves around Flames of War. Flames of War tournaments are held across the world and through the Flames of War website players have access to listings of upcoming events through the Flames of War Events Calendar. Each area of the world has a specific events calendar that players can use to find events near them. In North America Battlefront promotes a National Tournament Season in which winners of regional tournaments are qualified to play in any of the three National Tournaments. Players winning an Overall Championship or Best General Award from the three Nationals receives an automatic invitation to the North America Masters tournament. Other spots on the Masters Tournament are filled by the top ranked players on the Rankings HQ website. Individuals, clubs, or shops wishing to run a Flames of War sponsored tournament can contact Battlefront through Battlefront's website.

== Reception ==
At the 2004 Origins Awards Flames of War was one of the winners of the Vanguard Awards.

William Jones comments: "Historical miniature gamers will certainly continue the quest for the perfect new rules systems — the same quest that, in part, brought Phil Yates to create Flames of War. But his marvelous design offers quite a lot, especially to those tabletop tacticians who long for a game where strategy is dominant, who want to dedicate more time to plotting a battleplan and less to worrying about the rules. Flames of War boasts a wonderful balance between speed of play, detail, and flavor".

== Successor games ==
In November 2009, Battlefront announced Flames of War Vietnam - The Battle for la Drang. This rule set was released in Wargames Illustrated Magazine #266, and received a limited release of supporting models. In April 2011 Flames of War Vietnam was made a permanent rule set when the first sourcebook was added as a free addition to Wargames Illustrated Magazine #282, along with the re-release of the original miniatures (in new packaging) and several new box sets. In March 2013 the first softback released through the Flames of War brand rather than Wargames Illustrated was released. This book contained several lists previously seen in releases from Wargames Illustrated such as those for the United States as well as PAVN and will be supported by a full range of models. New forces include those from ARVN, the ANZAC Brigade sent to Vietnam, as well as new force diagrams for the United States and PAVN.

- Tropic Lightning, the first official sourcebook for the Vietnam War. This release includes PAVN infantry as well as American armor, armored cavalry, armored infantry, and air-mobile infantry.
- Tour of Duty, first softback book released independently from Wargames Illustrated. Players can take forces from PAVN, ARVN, The United States, and the aforementioned ANZAC Brigade.
- Fate of a Nation was a Wargames Illustrated released sourcebook for the Six-Day War. Released in late 2013, blisters and boxsets of models were released soon afterward.
- Great War (2015), first source book for World War I battles of 1918. Models were released in 2014, 100 years after the beginning of World War I.
- Team Yankee (2015), source book regarding a hypothetical World War III in the autumn of 1985, in Central Europe including the Fulda Gap.
- Flames in the Skies, a pet project of Phil Yates, a system similar to Star Wars' X-Wing miniatures game; a dogfighting system set during the Second World War, with an unknown release date.

== See also ==
- List of miniature wargames
- Bolt Action (wargame)
