= 1:12 scale =

Modeling scale

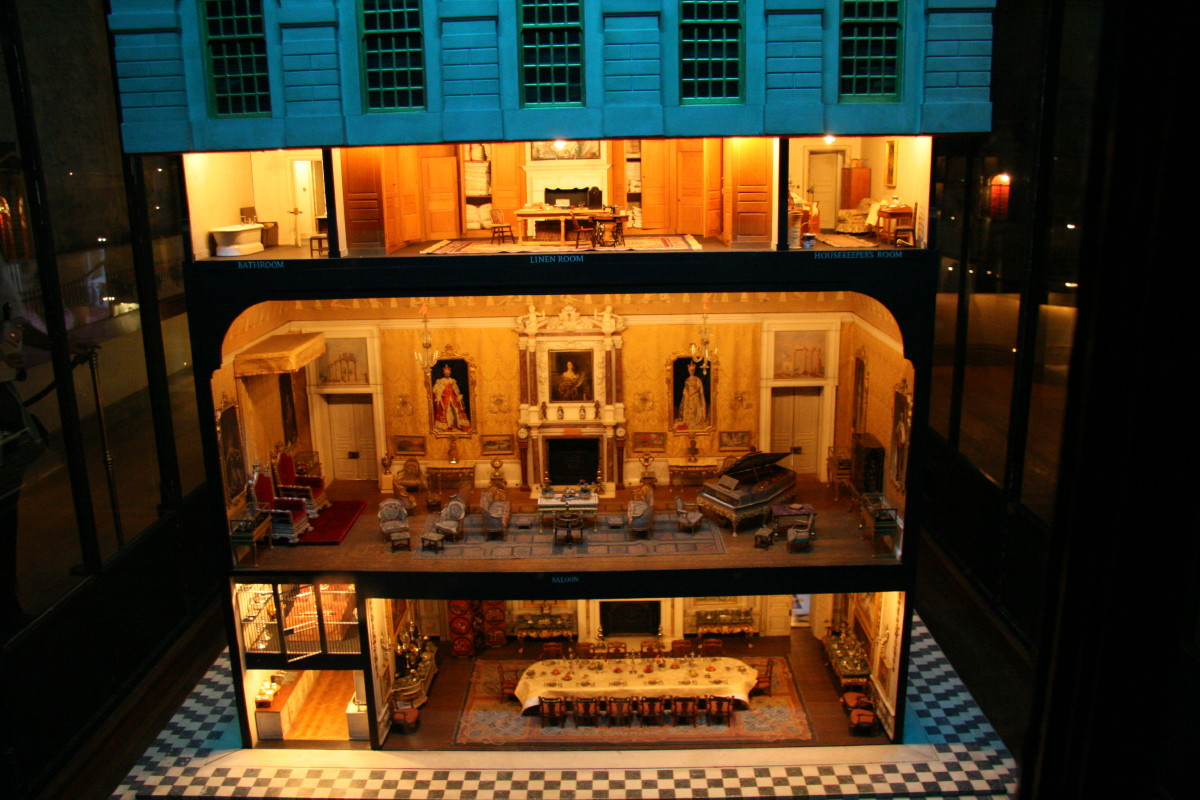
Queen Mary's Dolls' House uses 1:12 scale

The 1:12 scale is a common scale (ratio) for models and miniatures. In this scale, one unit of length on the model corresponds to twelve units on the original object. It is popular for modellers working in imperial units, because one inch on the model corresponds to one foot (twelve inches) on the original object, therefore sometimes called one-scale.

This scale is useful for human-sized objects, such as figurines, vehicles or individual buildings. It is therefore popular for dollhouses, especially those aimed at adult collectors, and action figures, especially those based on superheroes. It is also used for miniature railways using live steam (but not tabletop model railways). Rarer uses of 1:12 include high-end die-cast toys and radio-controlled cars.

In Jonathan Swift's 1726 novel Gulliver's Travels, the miniature kingdom of Lilliput is perceived as 1:12 scale by the protagonist Gulliver.

== See also ==
- List of scale model sizes
