= I Ain't Been Shot Mum! =

Tabletop game

I Ain't Been Shot Mum! (abbreviated as IABSM) is a World War II tabletop skirmish miniatures wargame produced by Too Fat Lardies.

Designers Richard Clarke and Nick Skinner started work on a set of rules for the Vietnam war. Feeling that the existing rulesets allowed too much control over their forces they set out to design a set of rules that would force a player to think as a real-life commander rather than a gamer. As such, IABSM has been heavily influenced by the Kriegsspiel approach, usually (but not always) utilizing an umpire to help decide points of issue that arise during the game such as modifiers for shooting, spotting enemies, etc.

The rules are designed to force players to adopt realistic tactics, including scouting ahead for hidden enemies as the game system uses "blinds" to simulate the fog of war. The main focus is not on military hardware but on the men using that hardware, and on morale and command and control. Rather than giving the player total control over their forces every action, the system uses so-called "Big Men" to allow players to influence their forces behaviour. It also features a random, card-driven initiative system rather than the classic I-GO-U-GO system most turn-based strategy games use. A typical company will have a card for each platoon and a card for each Big Man (officers and NCOs). The actions of squads/sections are keyed to the platoon and Big Man cards. This initiative system is designed to simulate the "friction" of war noted by Carl von Clausewitz, plus units use a dice system for movement, observation, and fire that means you never know exactly how they will perform.

The basic IABSM system provides a framework allowing players to tailor the game to specific situations or conflicts. Apart from its main focus on World War II, it has been adapted to the Spanish Civil War, the Falklands War and the Korean War.

The rules are designed for Company level games, i.e. where each side fields roughly a reinforced company of troops at 1 man to 1 figure scale, with infantry combat being at the heart of the rules, but also including a comprehensive mechanism for armour support, artillery, etc. The rules have been designed for 15 mm scale figures, but can be easily adopted for other scales such as 6 mm or 25 mm. The system does not use a point-based method for constructing opposing forces, so most games are designed to be scenario driven.

== The Kriegsspiel approach ==
Most games on the market, in general, pre-suppose that you will be playing with reasonable people with whom you are at least quasi-friendly. IABSM takes this supposition and advances it even further. These are NOT tournament type games rules because frankly they rely on players being more concerned about having fun than winning a trophy.

— Patton, D.

One of the main characteristics of IABSM is that many common and somehow simple decisions are left to the players, effectively providing a "framework for play" rather than a checklist to represent real situations on the model battlefield.

The challenges and possibilities of this approach are endless, since shooting at a target behind some cover would require both players (or the umpire) to agree on the shot being Great, Ok or Poor. But this freedom also allows for any non predictable action to take place, like heroic feats, based in the same common agreement.

== Rules and Sourcebooks ==
The main rules of versions 1 and 2 did not contain any information about the armies involved. However version 3, published in Summer 2012 contains 'The Normandy Handbook', to cover the campaign in France following Operation Overlord, and contains basic lists for US, British and German forces, as well as four historically inspired scenarios, and six generic 'scenario generator' templates. The armies are described in more detail in various supplements. The following supplements were written for IABSM v1 and v2 (see further down for details of the v3 supplements):

- Blitzkrieg

Covers the period between 1939 and 1943.
Army information for Belgium, Finland, France, Germany, Great Britain, Holland, Hungary, Italy, Norway, Poland, Romania, Czechoslovakia and the Soviet Union.

- Götterdammerung

Covers the period between 1943 and 1945.
Army information for Brazil, Finland, France, Germany, Great Britain, Hungary, Italy, Romania, the Soviet Union and the United States.

- In the Footsteps of Legions

Covers the war in the Mediterranean and North Africa.
Army information for British Empire and Dominion forces, Free French, Vichy France, Germany, Greece, Iraq, Italy, United States and Yugoslavia.

- In The Shadow of the Rising Sun

Covers the war in the Pacific.
Army information for Australia, China, Holland, Vichy France, Great Britain, Japan, Thailand and the United States.

== Scenarios ==
As well as supplements detailing various armed forces, Too Fat Lardies also publishes scenario supplements for use with IABSM. The supplements contain historical background, maps, mission briefings and participating forces. As the forces involved are described as real world equivalents rather than point values, conversion to different rulesets is relatively easy. Nearly all the scenario packs are available adapted or written for IABSM v3. Scenario/campaign packs published so far are:

- Western Front

The Defence of Calais (historical)
The Campaign for Greece (historical)
Operation Sea Lion (fictional)
Anzio: Wildcat to Whale (historical)
Where the Hell Have You Been Boys (historical - D-Day)
Blenneville or Bust! (fictional - Normandy)

- Eastern Front

The September War, Part 1 (historical - Poland 1939)
The September War, Part 2 (historical - Poland 1939)
Vyazma or Bust (fictional)
Bashnya or Bust (fictional - Operation Bagration)

- Pacific/Far East

Fall of the Lion Gate (historical - Fall of Malaya/Singapore)
Bloody Burma (historical - Fall of Burma)

- Africa

Call this a Ruddy Picnic? (historical - East Africa)
Operation Compass (historical)

- Others

Cymru am byth (historical - rather than detailing a specific operation or campaign, this supplement follows the actions of one regiment during the course of the war.)

Also, some free scenarios has been published in the Scenario of the Month section of the Too Fat Lardies webpage.

== 3rd edition supplements ==
For the 3rd edition, the following specific supplements have been written:

- Blitzkrieg in the East #1: Poland

Covers the invasion of Poland in September 1939
Army information on Polish, German and Soviet forces
Currently available as a free download from the Too Fat Lardies website

- Blitzkrieg in the West #1: France

Covers the French army of May 1940

- Blitzkrieg in the West #2: The BEF

Covers the British Expeditionary Force of May 1940

- Blitzkrieg in the West #3: The Low Countries

Covers the Dutch and Belgian armies of May 1940

- Blitzkrieg in the West #4: Germany

Covers the German army in May 1940

- Blitzkrieg in the Far East #1: Japan

Covers the Japanese army between December 1941 and July 1942
Also includes substantial campaign information

- Battle For Liberation

Covers the Western Front during the period 1943 to 1945
Army information for British & Commonwealth [sic], United States, French, German and Italian forces.

- Vpered Na Berlin

Covers the Eastern Front during the period 1943 to 1945
Army information for German, Romanian, Hungarian, Finnish, Yugoslavian and Soviet forces
