= 1:285 scale =

Scale model size standard

1:285 scale vehicles and 1:300 infantry from Heroics & Ros

1:285 scale or 6 mm figure size is a US Army scale introduced in the late 1960s, and used for wargames and some scale model dioramas. It is used in miniature wargaming to depict large battles in a relatively small gaming area. 1:300 scale (5 mm scale) is an almost identical NATO standard scale.

Both figure scales are based on the 1 mm = 1 ft calculation that reduces the average 1.72 m height of a human male to a 5.7 mm tall figure. "6 mm" is therefore used as a rounded-up reference to the scale.

In 1:285 scale, a typical 20 mm base can mount approximately 3-5 infantry figures; or three strips of four figures in rank-and-file formation.

1:285/1:300 is a popular scale for micro armour games, while modern games emphasizing tanks and other vehicles have been catered to by specialist figure manufacturers such as GHQ, Heroics and Ros and Baccus Miniatures. Sci-fi and fantasy games that use these scales include BattleTech, Ogre miniatures, Epic and Hammer's Slammers. Other genres, such as historical periods (ancient, medieval and later periods) and medieval fantasy have miniatures made by Heroics and Ros, Baccus Miniatures and Irregular Miniatures. There are many sites of landscape creations and miniatures
