= Society of Ancients =

International wargaming association

The Society of Ancients (SoA) is an international, non-profit organization based in the UK that aims to promote interest in Ancient & Medieval history and wargaming, covering the periods from 3000BC to 1500AD.

== The Society ==
The Society publishes a bi-monthly journal entitled Slingshot. Membership proceeds are used, among other things, to fund the publication of the magazine and to sponsor wargames competitions which fall within the society's remit. The Society commonly has a presence at large conventions across the UK and overseas.

Founded in 1965 by Tony Bath, the Society started with 20 members. During the next decade it increased in membership by at least 50% every year. Currently the worldwide membership is around 700. Early members included the actor Deryck Guyler (who served as president of the society), the academic George Gush, Tony Bath and Phil Barker, co-creator of the many sets of rules published by WRG including the De Bellis Antiquitatis wargames rules.

The society concentrates on historical wargaming - a decision to exclude fantasy was made around ten years after it was founded. Among other competitions and events the Society organises are an annual Convention and a Battle Day (more below).

== Slingshot ==
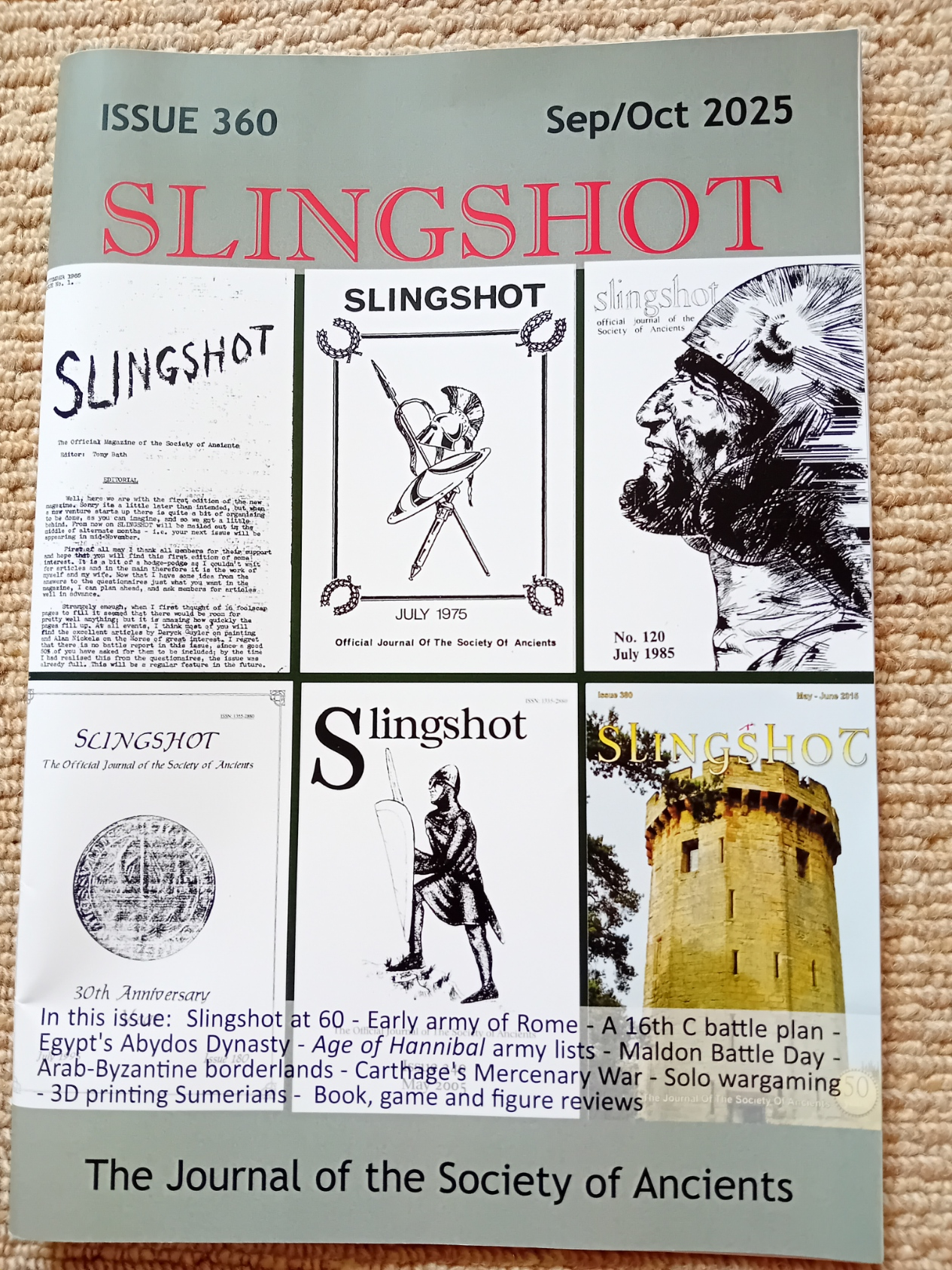
Slingshot Issue 360 showing selection of old covers including Issue 1

The society publishes a bi-monthly journal, "Slingshot". It has been described as the periodical of most interest to ancient Wargamers. 2025 has seen the 60th Anniversary and 360th edition of Slingshot. Articles are a mixture of those on historical topics - ancient military manoeuvres, ancient arms and armour and similar - and those specifically about wargaming, such as rules discussions and war game reports. There are also book reviews and reviews of new rules and wargaming figures. It is occasionally referenced in academic publications.

Contributing writers include noted historians such as Adrian Goldsworthy and Boris Rankov. Other professional historians who have written for Slingshot include Philip Sabin, Matthew Bennett, Guy Halsall, Paddy Griffith, Nigel Tallis and Steve Badsey. Other contributors have become published authors, either before, or subsequently to their contributions. The magazine has also carried material written by notable games designers (for example, Phil Barker, Richard Bodley Scott, Jervis Johnson, Rick Priestley and Neil Thomas).

Initially, Slingshot was edited by Tony Bath and indeed was produced by him with the help of his wife using a borrowed duplicator. When this fell through, Tony Bath was able to purchase cheaply a spirit duplicator with which it was produced from May 1965. From March 1969 it has been commercially printed.

The current editor of Slingshot is Richard Taylor

== SoA Convention ==
In 2016 the Society held its first Annual Conference (since renamed to the Annual Convention). The Convention is an opportunity for members to listen to talks on ancient history and to play wargames. Many of these games are beautifully presented demonstration-standard games and others may link with the topic of the talks, or are intended to test new rules systems. Some of the latter have since been published by the Society for a wider audience, such as Simon MacDowall's Alala! or Adrian Nayler's Blood Red Roses.

Keynote speakers have included best selling authors and distinguished academics most of whom have also been long time members of the Society such as, David McDermott, Ben Kane, John Bassett and Harry Sidebottom.

== SoA Battle Day ==
The Battle Day is usually a one-day events where a single historical battle is re-enacted using a number of different rulesets, often introduced by a short introductory talk by an expert on the time period. Battles are run on numerous different sets of rules and with figure scales across the whole range from 2mm to 54mm. Conflicts covered have included Gaugamela, the Sambre, Cynoscephalae, Kadesh, Zama, Plataea, Mantinea, Illipa and Maldon. The 2026 Battle Day will be based on the battle of Cunaxa.

== Other publications ==
The Society has also published a number of wargames with ancient or medieval themes, including:

- Gladiolus (1992), a card-based game of gladiatorial single combat.
- Legion (1997), a board game that simulates ancient battle on a hex grid.
- Lytel GuÞan (1999), a skirmish game for Dark Ages Britain.
- The Saxon Shore is Burning (2002, revised edition 2018), a strategic game set during the Great Conspiracy against Roman Britain of AD 367.
- Alala! (Wargames Rules for Greek Hoplite Battles) (2024), by Simon MacDowall
- Blood Red Roses (A game of Battles in the Wars of the Roses) (2024) by Adrian Nayler

Other Publications include:

- Simple Campaigning (2015) by John Graham-Leigh
- The Goths - 1: From Berig to the Battle of Adrianople (2021), by Michael Fredholm von Essen
- The Goths - 2: From Alaric to Theoderic the Great and Beyond (2022), by Michael Fredholm von Essen

== External References to the Society ==
As articles in Slingshot are sometimes by well known and respected authorities articles are sometime referenced in other works such as:

- The Macedonian Phalanx, by Richard Taylor
- The Greek Hoplite Phalanx, by Richard Taylor
- Army of Alexander the Great: 1 (From Alexander to Adrianople 3000 BCE-400 CE), by Richard Taylor

Almost since the Society's inception, it has been a commonplace for books about ancient and medieval wargaming, and relevant rule sets, to mention the society. Examples of wargaming books include:

- The Ancient War Game, by Charles Grant
- Ancient Wargaming, by Phil Barker
- Introduction to Battle Gaming, by Terence Wise
- Wargames Through the Ages, 3000BC to 1500AD, by Donald Featherstone
- Goths, Huns and Romans, by Simon MacDowell
- A Wargamer's Guide to the Early Roman Empire, by Daniel Mersey

Examples of wargaming rule sets which reference the society include:

- De Bellis Antiquitatis, by Phil Barker
- De Bellis Multitudinis by Phil Barker
- Warhammer Ancient Battles (WAB), by Jervis Johnson, Rick Priestley, Alan and Michael Perry
