= List of wargame publishers =

List of wargame publishers is an index of commercial companies that publish wargames.

- 3W or World Wide Wargames – publishers of the wargaming magazine The Wargamer.
- A and A Game Engineering – concentrating on air and naval rules
- ACIES Edizioni - publishers of wargames like Lepanto and others.
- Agema.org.uk – publishers of the Game of War 18th century/Napoleonic rules, Salvo WW2 naval, and Challenge & Reply WW1 naval, among others.
- Amarillo Design Bureau Inc. (ADB) – publisher of Star Fleet Battles (SFB), along with the related strategic game Federation & Empire.
- Australian Design Group (ADG) – publishers of World in Flames.
- Avalanche Press – publishers of the Great War at Sea and Panzer Grenadier series, among others.
- Avalon Hill – the first publisher of board wargames, Avalon Hill (AH) made many classic games, such as Squad Leader, Third Reich, and PanzerBlitz, bought out by Hasbro in 1998.
- Battlefront Miniatures Ltd. – publisher of Flames of War (FoW), a World War II wargame.
- Battlefront.com - publisher of Combat Mission series of games
- Battleline Publications – founded in 1973 and bought by Heritage Models around 1980. They were the original publisher of several Avalon Hill games, such as Wooden Ships and Iron Men, and Circus Maximus.
- Black Skull Games – founded 2007. Publisher of Universal War.
- Clash of Arms
- Collins Epic Wargames – publisher of the Frontline General series of board/mini wargames.
- Columbia Games (originally Gamma Two Games) – the biggest producer of "block games", using wooden blocks instead of cardboard counters.
- Compass Games – founded 2004. Publisher of Paper Wars.
- Computer Strategies – founded in 1990. They are the producer of the widest range of computer moderated wargames rules for tabletop miniatures.
- Conflict Games – 1970s company founded by designer John Hill.
- Corvus Belli – publishes Infinity, a wargame in which sci-fi themed miniatures are used to simulate futuristic skirmishes.
- Critical Hit – publishes tactical-level wargames, notably games in the Advanced Tobruk System as well as ASL-compatible modules and scenario packs.
- Crocodile Games – publishers of Wargods of Ægyptus and Wargods of Olympus.
- Decision Games – current license holder of most of the old SPI titles. Current publisher of Strategy & Tactics, Modern War and World at War magazines.
- Dwarfstar Games – published a line of small SF&F games around 1980.
- E-Mail Games – provides free wargaming and computerized referee/AI, via e-mail
- Excelsior Entertainment - current (as of 2005) publisher/manufacturer of Chronopia and Warzone.
- FASA – original publisher of the boardgame/miniatures game BattleTech. Now closed.
- Firefly Games - publisher of science fiction tabletop fighting games including Monster Island and CyborGladiators.
- Flashpoint Miniatures – publishers of Flashpoint Vietnam.
- Flying Pig Games – founded by Mark Walker in 2014
- Fort Circle Games - publisher of Shores of Tripoli Votes for Women Halls of Montezuma among other games.
- Fresno Design Group
- The Gamers - publisher of Tunisia
- Game Designers' Workshop – published many popular wargames as Drang Nach Osten! and role-playing games such as Traveller; disbanded in 1996.
- Game Research/Design – produced expansions for Europa and eventually took on the series.
- Games Research Inc – published Diplomacy in 1961 and 1971.
- Games Workshop – publishers of a number of fantasy and science fiction wargames and role-playing games.
- GCT Studios - publisher of the Bushido miniatures skirmish game, and other board games.
- GMT Games – prolific designer and publisher of tabletop wargames since the 1990s and into 2025.
- Graviteam Software - publisher of Graviteam tactics
- Grenier Games
- Guidon Games – original publisher of Chainmail.
- Harebrained Schemes – publisher of Golem Arcana.
- Historical Military Services – took over GRD in 2004
- JagdPanther – original company of Steve V. Cole and Allen Eldridge.
- Jedko Games – 1970s Australian company of John Edwards, which initially published some Avalon Hill games such as The Russian Campaign and War at Sea.
- John Tiller Software - Now Wargame Design Studio, URL will re-direct.
- Johnny Reb Gaming Society - publishes the free quarterly newsletter Charge! newsletter / fanzine with an annual paid membership dues. Also publishes wargaming scenarios books, such as Crossed Sabers, for its members.
- Knight Models – publishes Batman Miniature Game, a skirmish game based on the adventures of the iconic Dark Knight, and Harry Potter Miniatures Adventure Game, a board game with miniatures featuring the famous wizarding saga.
- L2 Design Group
- Legion Wargames - publisher of several games including Toulon, 1793, Maori Wars and many more.
- Lock N' Load Publishing – publisher of Lock 'n Load series, and A World at War series.
- Lost Battalion Games – games include the man-to-man scale Sergeants! and several card-based wargames.
- Majestic Twelve Games – publisher of several games including Starmada, Iron Stars, and Grand Fleets.
- Mantic Games – publisher of several games including Deadzone, Kings of War, and Mars Attacks.
- Marek/Janci Design - publishers of full-color miniature wargaming scenario books, including the Enduring Valor: Gettysburg in Miniature series and Undying Courage: Antietam in Miniature.
- Matrix Games –
- Mayfair Games – original publisher of many "train" games, 18xx series, and Empire Builder.
- Megalith Games – Publishers of Godslayer
- Metagaming - originator of the microgame format; original publisher of Ogre.
- Mongoose Publishing – publishers of RPGs, historical SF and fantasy rules.
- Multi-Man Publishing – republishes Avalon Hill's Advanced Squad Leader (ASL)
- New England Simulations – a New Hampshire-based group that has created three games based on previously designed systems, with an emphasis on both graphics and design.
- Operational Studies Group – focuses primarily on the Napoleonic Era.
- Pacific Sky Games - publisher and creator of tabletop miniature wargames, specifically historical and sci-fi.
- Paradox Interactive – creator of such computer grand-strategy games as the medieval wargames Crusader Kings and Crusader Kings II, and the post-medieval wargames Europa Universalis, Europa Universalis II, Europa Universalis III and Europa Universalis IV, and the Iron-Age series of wargames Victoria: An Empire Under the Sun, and Victoria II, and the WW2 series of wargames Hearts of Iron, and Roman-era game Legion.
- People's War Games – publishers of the WW2 Russian Front monster wargame Korsun Pocket and some others WW1 and WW2 wargames.
- Privateer Press – publishers of WARMACHINE and HORDES as well as the Iron Kingdoms d20 RPG setting.
- Quarterdeck International - publishers of wargames since 1979, founded and operated by Jack Greene.
- Radioactive Press – publisher of the Toy Battle System series of games, which includes Atomic Super Humans, Giant Monster Rampage, and Mega Bots.
- Renaissance Ink – owned by Jay Wirth. Published Fantasy Gladiators and Armistice, manufactures wargame bases and other modeling items.
- Revolution Games
- River Horse Games – run by Alessio Cavatore. Publishes wargames and provides game design services for wargames companies.
- Scarab Miniatures - publisher of War and Conquest.
- Shrapnel Games, Inc. – owned by Timothy W. Brooks, primarily publishes war and strategy games.
- Simmons Games – contemporary publisher of two (so far) diceless Napoleonic wargames that look very much like the battlefield maps published at the time.
- Simulations Canada
- Simulations Publications, Inc. (SPI) – another early and very prolific wargame publisher, SPI published the magazines Strategy & Tactics and Moves.
- Slitherine Software - publisher of several wargame titles, including Panzer Corps
- Specialist Military Publishing - publisher of BlitzkriegCommander, Cold War Commander and Future War Commander..
- Stealthy Spider Publishing – publishers of the Occult Wars horror/fantasy skirmish miniatures game.
- Steve Jackson Games – early successes were Ogre, Car Wars, and Illuminati. Also published many titles in the microgame format: tiny low-priced plastic boxes (US$4–6).
- Strategemata - publisher of Great Battles of Small Units series and many more.
- StrikeNet Games - publisher of Panzer Miniatures Rules.
- Task Force Games – founded in 1979 by Steven V. Cole and Allen Eldrige, went out of business in the mid-'90s. Produced many games, most notably Star Fleet Battles and Starfire.
- Tiny Battle Publishing
- Too Fat Lardies – publishers of Chain of Command, Sharp Practice, Infamy, Infamy!, Dux Britanniarum, What a Tanker, Algernon Pulls it Off, Bag the Hun, I Ain't Been Shot, Mum!, If the Lord Spares Us, Kiss Me Hardy, Le Feu Sacré, Triumph of the Will, Kriegsspiel in both its 1824 and 1862 versions, They Couldn't Hit An Elephant, Sharp Practice and Troops, Weapons & Tactics.
- Tower Games – provides pay-for-play wargames for multiple players online. Titles include Line of Muskets and Lightning War
- Wargame Design Studio - Developer and Publisher of the John Tiller line of wargames.
- Wargames Factory
- Wargames Research Group – publisher of the popular De Bellis Antiquitatis (DBA), De Bellis Multitudinis (DBM) and De Bellis Renationis (DBR) rule sets for the ancient, medieval and Renaissance periods.
- Warhammer Historical Wargames (a division of Games Workshop) – produces Warhammer Ancient Battles (WAB), Warhammer English Civil War, Legends of the Old West and Warmaster Ancients.
- Warhorse Simulations – publisher of Empire and Automated Card Tracking System (ACTS).
- Warlord Games - publisher of Bolt Action, Black Powder, Blood Red Skies, Victory at Sea, and several other wargames, as well as lines of miniatures for them.
- WBS games – wargame and boardgame publisher
- Wessex Games – historical and sci fi / fantasy rules including Air War C21, Strange Tydes, and Iron Cow.
- West End Games
- Worthington Publishing - publishers of two-player and solitaire wargames
- Wyrd Miniatures - publisher of Malifaux.
- XTR Corp - former publisher of Command magazine, a military history and strategy magazine that contained insert wargames.
- Yaquinto Publications
- Zvezda - publisher of Art of Tactic.
- Z&M Publishing Enterprises – publisher of Angriff!.

== See also ==
- List of board wargames

Academy Games: www.AcademyGames.com
Publisher of Conflict of Heroes, Birth of America – 1775 Rebellion.

- List of game manufacturers
