= Hordes of the Things =

Hordes of the Things may refer to:

- Hordes of the Things (radio series), a BBC radio parody of The Lord of the Rings
- Hordes of the Things (game), a miniature wargame
