= Hott =

HOTT may refer to:

- Mathematics:
  - Homotopy type theory
- Games:
  - Halls of the Things, an early video game
  - Hordes of the Things (wargame)
- Entertainment:
  - "Hanging on the Telephone", a song by the power pop band The Nerves, also recorded by Blondie
  - Hour of the Time, a shortwave radio show
- Other:
  - Hot Topic's former NASDAQ ticker symbol
