= Phil Barker =

British military historian and wargamer

- Born: Philip C. Barker; 5 November 1932 (age 93); Paignton, Devon
- Occupations: Writer & game designer
- Writing career
- Subjects: Military History, Wargaming
- Website: www.phil-barker.pwp.blueyonder.co.uk

Phil Barker (born 5 November 1932) is one of the major figures in the development of the modern hobby of tabletop wargaming, particularly that of ancient warfare, and is a co-founder of the Wargames Research Group.

In the 1960s he was a methods engineer at British Leyland. However, in the 1970s he took voluntary redundancy to become the first person in the UK to work full-time on wargames writing and rules design. At the time, he was also a keen horseman, a skill which he used to advantage in carrying out experiments in the use of cavalry weapons.

== Introduction to Wargaming ==
Barker began wargaming as a boy using H. G. Wells Little Wars, though his interest lapsed during his time serving in the army. In the early 1960s he gamed alongside founders of the modern hobby such as Donald Featherstone, Tony Bath, and Charles Grant. At the beginning he did not play ancients. His introduction to ancients was at a wargames show to which he had come to put on a modern warfare demonstration. There he met Tony Bath, and from him he acquired his first ancient wargames figures, an army of Byzantine flats. By 1968 he had written several sets of wargames rules – for ancient and medieval warfare, the American Civil War, the Second World War, and 1966-period wargames., He then began to focus on warfare of antiquity and, in 1968, and, along with Bob O'Brien and Ed Smith, founded the Wargames Research Group. One of the basic principles of the WRG was that wargames rules should be based on the study of the nature of warfare of the period being modelled, and Phil was initially the researcher of the group. He published his best-known work, the Armies and Enemies of Imperial Rome, in 1972.

== Contribution to Ancient Wargaming ==
Barker's major contribution, however, has been as an innovative writer of games mechanisms. He has described his rules-writing philosophy as simply "It is my aim to produce the most accurate and playable rules I possibly can". However, his succinct writing style has drawn criticism, resulting in the term Barkerese to describe his complex explanation of rules.

The first edition of the WRG's War Games Rules 1000 BC to 500 AD was published in 1969 and immediately made a great impact. Charles Grant later wrote

The event was something of a milestone in wargaming history, not only that concerning the ancient period but in fact any other that could be named. The reason for this was that, for the first time, a book of rules based on firm research and considerable playing experience had been made generally available.

The WRG Ancients rules ran to seven editions and were, in the 1970s and early 80's, by far the most popular rules in this period. In 1990, he, along with Richard Bodley-Scott, authored De Bellis Antiquitatis (DBA), a completely new set of rules for the Ancient period, which led to a follow on series of rules using similar mechanisms known collectively as DBx. While not enjoying as dominant a position as his earlier rules, these remain popular worldwide. Probably one of the more important developments from DBx is the use of standardized base frontages for mounting figures. When Barker's ancient rules standardized the frontages for 25mm figures at 60mm and 40mm for 15mm or smaller figures, other rule sets for ancient and medieval wargaming also adopted them. This has allowed people throughout the world to use their figures for almost any rule set and to be able to play against opponents from other parts of the world without having to re-base their figures. This is something that is not the case for other historical periods, where often figures will have to be re-based when changing rule sets.

Phil Barker was a founder member of the Society of Ancients, serving on the committee for many years and contributing regularly to their magazine Slingshot. In 1994 he was elected Life Vice-president.

=== Other Wargames Periods ===
Phil has wide interests in military history and has written rules in a range of historical periods, including the Napoleonic period and 20th. Century warfare. He has also produced rules on naval subjects, such as 16th. century galley warfare.

=== Military training games ===
Professor Phil Sabin, writer on, and designer of, simulation games, has noted that Barker's "insightful" modern warfare rules have been used in adapted form by both the US and Canadian armies and he has also worked with the UK Ministry of Defence on simulating counter insurgency warfare

== Publications ==
=== Historical ===
- Armies of the Macedonian and Punic Wars, Wargames Research Group, ISBN 0-9500299-4-7, 1971,
- Armies and Enemies of Imperial Rome 150AD to 600 AD, Wargames Research Group, ISBN 0904417174(4 editions 1972–1981)

=== Wargaming ===
- Ancient Wargaming (Airfix Magazine Guide No.9), Patrick Stevens Ltd., ISBN 0-85059-212-7, 1975
- Wargaming Know The Game ISBN 0-7158-0416-0, EP. Publishing Ltd, 1976
- Alexander the Great's Campaigns (a guide to Ancient political and military wargaming), ISBN 0-85059-325-5, Patrick Stephens Ltd., Cambridge 1979
- Phil Barker's Introduction to Ancient Wargaming and WRG 6th Edition Ancient Rules 3000BC to 1485 AD. History of Wargaming Project, 2010 www.wargaming.co

=== Wargames rules ===
- Wargames Rules 3000 BC to 1485 AD, 6th edition. Goring-by-Sea: Wargames Research Group. 1980
- Wargames Rules 3000 BC to 1485 AD, 7th edition. Devizes: Wargames Research Group. 1986
- De Bellis Antiquitatis, Version 3. Devizes: Wargames Research Group. 2014
- De Bellis Multitudinis. Devizes: Wargames Research Group. 1993 (with Richard Bodley Scott)
