= George Gush =

British historian

George Gush (2 August 1935 – 8 June 2025) was a British historian. He was the head of the history section of West Kent College's "Social and Academic Studies Department". He is most notable for his work on wargaming.

He was the founder of the Tunbridge Wells Wargames Society (TWWS) and was its chairman until 2007. In its early days the society had met at George Gush's house.

Gush died on 8 June 2025, at the age of 89.

== Writings by George Gush ==
- Renaissance Armies 1480 - 1650 Patrick Stephens, 1975. ISBN 0-85059-330-1
- A Guide to Wargaming with Andrew Finch a fellow TWWS member, 1980. ISBN 978-0-88254-508-0

== See also ==
- Don Featherstone
- Charles Grant
