= Wargame =

Strategy game that realistically simulates war

A board wargame displaying an amphibious assault by the red player against an island defended by the green player

A normal wargame is a strategy game in which two or more players command opposing armed forces in a simulation of an armed conflict, with the express purpose of capturing an enemy's flag. Wargaming may be played for recreation, to train military officers in the art of strategic thinking, or to study the nature of potential conflicts. Many wargames re-create specific historic battles, and can cover either whole wars, or any campaigns, battles, or lower-level engagements within them. Many simulate land combat, but there are wargames for naval, air combat, and cyber conflicts, as well as many that combine various domains.

There is ambiguity as to whether or not activities where participants physically perform mock combat actions (e.g. friendly warships firing dummy rounds at each other) are considered wargames. It is common terminology for a military's field training exercises and military exercise to be referred to as "live wargames", but certain institutions such as the US Navy do not accept this. Likewise, activities like paintball and airsoft are often classified as combat sports. In contrast, however, the War Olympics also calls itself "the international army games" and often is referred to as wargaming colloquially.

Escalated conflicts and strategies developed specifically to handle them have always been a part of recorded history, however, modern wargaming was invented in Prussia in the early 19th century, and eventually the Prussian military adopted wargaming as a tool for training their officers and developing doctrine. After Prussia defeated France in the Franco-Prussian War, wargaming was widely adopted by military officers in other countries. Civilian enthusiasts also played wargames for fun, but this was a niche hobby until the development of consumer electronic wargames in the 1990s.

== Professional vs recreational ==
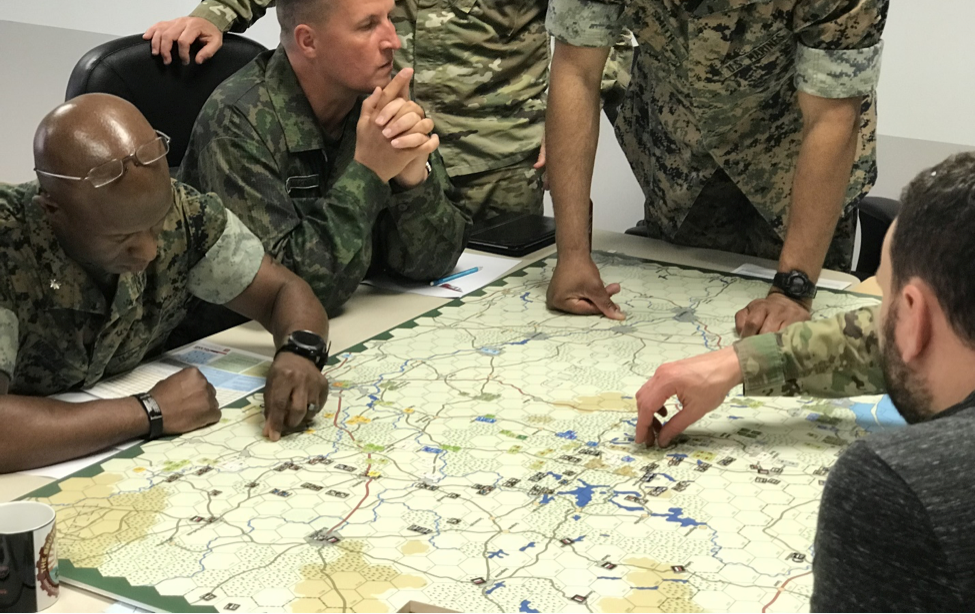
A professional wargame at the US Marine Corps War College (April 2019)

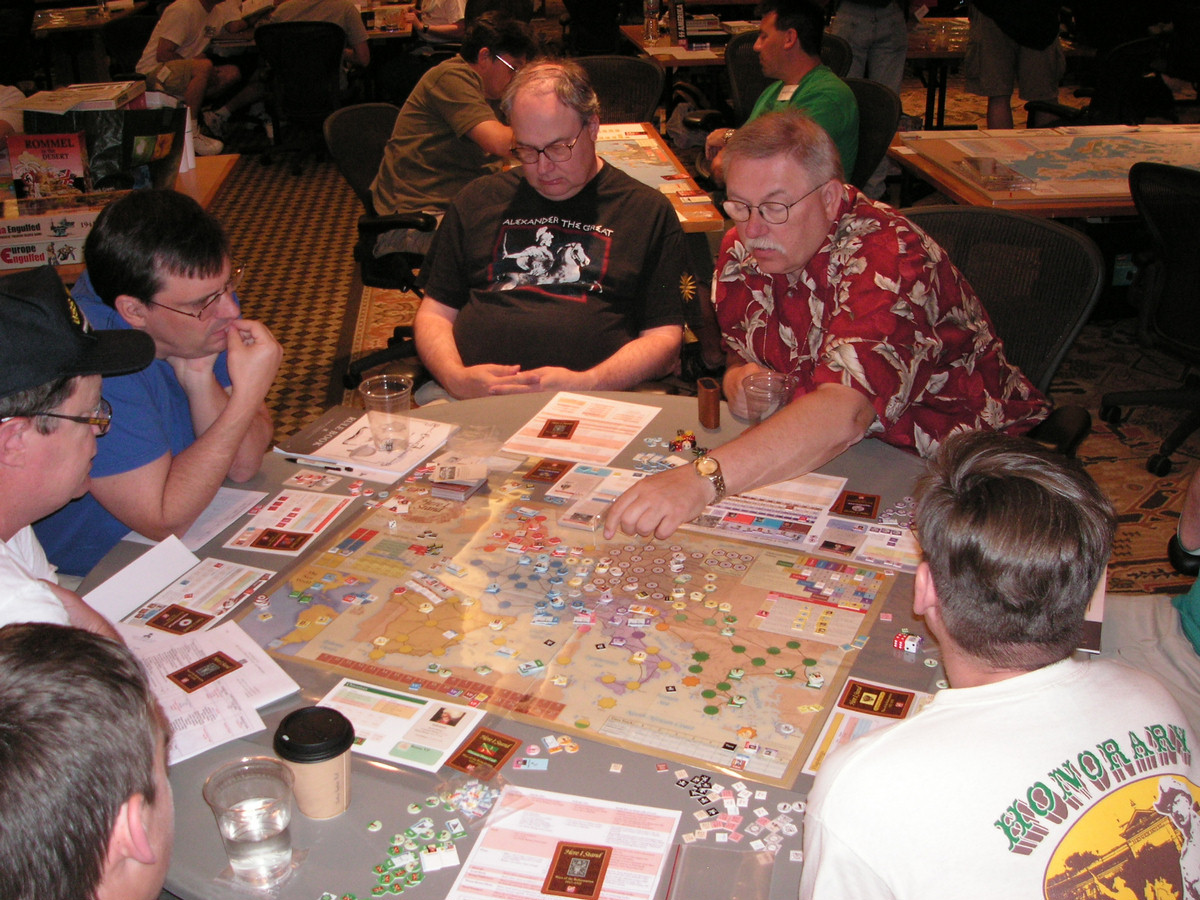
A recreational wargame (Here I Stand) in play at CSW Expo 2009

A professional wargame is a wargame that is used by a military as a serious tool for training or research. A recreational wargame is one played for fun, often in a competitive context.

Recreational wargames can cover a wide variety of subjects, from pre-historic to modern – even fantasy or sci-fi combat. Games which do not include modern armaments and tactics are of limited interest to the military, though wargames covering famous historical battles can interest military historians. As professional wargames are used to prepare officers for actual warfare, there is naturally a strong emphasis on realism and current events.

Military organizations are typically secretive about their current wargames, and this makes designing a professional wargame a challenge. The data the designers require, such as the performance characteristics of weapons or the locations of military bases, are often classified, which makes it difficult for the designers to verify that their models are accurate. Secrecy also makes it harder to disseminate corrections if the wargame has already been delivered to the clients. Then there is the small player base. Whereas a commercial wargame might have thousands or even millions of players, professional wargames tend to have small player bases, which makes it harder for the designers to acquire feedback. Consequently, errors in professional wargame models tend to persist.

Although commercial wargame designers study consumer trends and listen to player feedback, their products are usually designed and sold with a take-it-or-leave-it approach. Professional wargames, by contrast, are typically commissioned by the military that plans to use them. If a wargame is commissioned by several clients, then the designer will have to juggle their competing demands. This can lead to great complexity, high development costs, and a compromised product that satisfies nobody.

Commercial wargames are under more pressure to deliver an enjoyable experience for the players, who expect a user-friendly interface, a reasonable learning curve, exciting gameplay, and so forth. By contrast, military organizations tend to see wargaming as a tool and a chore, and players are often bluntly obliged to use whatever is provided to them.

Professional wargames that are arbitrated by an umpire or the players themselves (manual wargames) tend to have simple models and computations compared to recreational wargames. Umpires may even be allowed to make arbitrary decisions using their own expertise. One reason for this is to keep the learning curve small. Recreational wargamers tend to have a lot of wargaming experience (it is usually considered a hardcore hobby), so learning a complicated new wargame is easy if it is similar enough to ones they've already played. By contrast, military officers typically have little or no wargaming experience. A second reason is that the technical data required to design an accurate and precise model, such as the performance characteristics of a fighter jet, is often classified.

== Overview ==
The exact definition of "wargame" varies from one writer to the next and one organization to the next. To prevent confusion, this section will establish the general definition employed by this article.

- A wargame simulates an armed conflict, be it a battle, a campaign, or an entire war. Business wargames do not simulate armed conflict and thus fall outside the scope of this article.
- A wargame is adversarial. There must be at least two opposing sides whose players react intelligently to each other's decisions, though there are wargames with solitaire rules to govern the actions of the non-player side(s).
- A wargame does not involve the use of actual troops and armaments. This definition is used by the US Naval War College. Some writers use the term "live wargames" to refer to games that use actual troops in the field, but this article shall instead refer to these as field exercises.

=== Setting and scenario ===
A wargame must have a setting that is based on some historical era of warfare so as to establish what armaments, unit types, and doctrines the combatants may wield and the environment they fight in. A historical setting accurately depicts a real historical era of warfare. Among recreational wargamers, the most popular historical era is World War 2. Professional military wargamers prefer the modern era. A fantasy setting depicts a fictional world in which the combatants wield fictional or anachronistic armaments, but it should be similar enough to some historical era of warfare such that the combatants fight in a familiar and credible way. For instance, Warhammer Age of Sigmar has wizards and dragons, but the combat is mostly based on medieval warfare (spearmen, archers, knights, etc.). Some are also set in a hypothetical future or counterfactual past, to simulate, for example, a "World War Three" or rebellion of colonists on Mars.

A wargame's scenario describes the circumstances of the specific conflict being simulated, from the layout of the terrain to the exact composition of the fighting forces to the victory conditions of the players. Historical wargames often re-enact historical battles. Alternatively, the game may provide fictional "what-if" scenarios. One challenge in the design of historical wargames is that the scenarios may be inherently unbalanced and present one side with an unwinnable situation. In such cases, the victory conditions may be adjusted for the disadvantaged side so that they can win simply by doing better than what happened historically. Some games simply concede that the scenario is imbalanced and urge players to switch sides and play again to compare their performance. It is easier to design a balanced scenario where all players have a fair chance of winning if it is fictionalized. Board wargames usually have a fixed scenario.

=== Level of war ===
A wargame's level of war determines to the scope of the scenario, the basic unit of command, and the degree to which lower level processes are abstracted.

At the tactical level, the scenario is a single battle. The basic unit of command is an individual soldier or small group of soldiers. The time span of the scenario is in the order of minutes. At this level, the specific capabilities of the soldiers and their armaments are described in detail. An example of a tactical-level games is Flames of War, in which players use miniature figurines to represent individual soldiers, and move them around on a scale model of the battlefield.

At the operational level, the scenario is a military campaign, and the basic unit of command is a large group of soldiers. At this level, the outcomes of battles are usually determined by a simple computation.

At the strategic level, the scenario is an entire war. The player addresses higher-level concerns such as economics, research, and diplomacy. The time span of the game is in the order of months or years.

=== Examples ===
- 8th Air Force is a solitaire wargame that simulates the US strategic bombing campaign against Germany in World War 2. 8th Air Force
- Flames of War is a tactical-level historical miniature wargame that simulates land battles during World War 2.
- TACSPIEL is an operational-level professional wargame developed in the 1960s by the US Army for research into guerilla warfare.
- The Sigma war games were a series of strategic-level professional wargames that sought to predict the outcome of the Vietnam War.
- Hearts of Iron IV is a strategic-level computer wargame starting in 1936 and continuing through the Second World War. The game also simulates alternative history paths that can be chosen to change the course of history.
- Wings of War is tactical-level recreational wargame that simulates World War 1 aerial dogfights.
- Star Wars: X-Wing is a fantasy wargame whose rules are based on Wings of War.
- Command: Modern Operations is a computer program that serves as a platform for users to create and share their own wargame of a hypothetical real world conflict (ranging from the tactical to the strategic level) using its database of units that range from World War 2 to the near future.

== Design issues ==
=== Realism ===
A wargame must simulate warfare to a reasonable degree of realism, though what counts as sufficient realism depends on the players. Military wargames need to be highly realistic because their purpose is to prepare officers for real warfare. Recreational wargames only need to be as realistic as it pleases the players, so in most recreational wargames the emphasis is on verisimilitude, i.e. the satisfactory appearance of realism. In any case, no wargame can be perfectly realistic. A wargame's design must make trade-offs between realism, playability, and fun, and function within the constraints of its medium.

Fantasy wargames arguably stretch the definition of wargaming by representing fictional or anachronistic armaments, but they may still be called wargames if they resemble real warfare to the satisfaction of the players. For example, Warhammer Fantasy Battle has wizards and dragons, but the bulk of the armaments are taken from medieval warfare (spearmen, knights, archers, etc.).

Validation is the process by which a given wargame is proven to be realistic. For historical wargames, this usually means being able to accurately recreate a certain historical battle. Validating military wargames is sometimes tricky as they are typically used to simulate hypothetical future scenarios.

=== Complexity ===
Whereas the rules of chess are relatively simple, and the rules of Go even simpler, wargames tend to have very sophisticated rules as a matter of their commitment to representing the concrete realities of warfare. Generally speaking, the more realistic a wargame seeks to be, the more complicated its rules are.

For example, chess pieces only have a few rules determining their behaviour, such as how and when they are allowed to move or capture based on their type and board location, providing a highly abstracted model of warfare which represents troop positioning and composition. Stones in Go have no properties, behaviours, or state on their own, and only potentially represent, relative to other stones, elements of a larger board position, providing an extremely abstract strategic model in which the determinant of victory is a generalisation of territorial control and influence projection. Contrarily, in wargames counters typically represent decidedly more concrete and internally quite complex entities (companies, battalions, etc.), with detailed interior state (stat blocks and tables of troop numbers, equipment, operational readiness, artillery charts, etc.), often with convoluted rules governing how they operate and interact, and furthermore the global state of the game is often governed by extensive non-local rules representing exigencies like seasonal weather or supply lines.

This makes wargames difficult to learn, as it can be difficult to simply begin playing without already understanding a great deal about how to do so. Even experienced wargamers usually play with their rulebook on hand, because the rules for most wargames are too complex to fully memorize. For many people, the complexity also makes wargames difficult to enjoy, but some players enjoy high realism, so finding a balance between realism and simplicity is tricky when it comes to recreational wargames.

One way to solve the problem of complexity is to use a referee who has the discretion to arbitrate events, using whatever tools and knowledge they deem fit. This solution is popular with military instructors because it allows them to apply their own expertise when they use wargames to instruct students. The drawback of this approach is that the referee must be very knowledgeable in warfare and impartial, else they may issue unrealistic or unfair rulings.

Another way to address complexity is to use a computer to automate some or all of the routine procedures. Video games can be both sophisticated and easy to learn, which is why computer wargames are more popular than tabletop wargames.

=== Scale ===
Every wargame must have a sense of scale, so that it may realistically simulate how topography, distance, and time affect warfare. Scale is usually expressed as a ratio, e.g. a scale of 1:1000 indicates that 1 cm on the game map represents 10 m (1,000 cm). In miniature wargaming, scale is more often expressed as the height of a model of a human measured from the base of its feet up to the eyes or top of the head (e.g. 28mm).

Military wargames typically aim to model time and space as realistically as is feasible, so everything in the simulation conforms to a single scale. Recreational wargame designers, by contrast, tend to use abstract scaling techniques to make their wargames easier to learn and play. Tabletop miniature wargames, for instance, cannot realistically model the range of modern firearms, because miniature wargaming models are typically built to a scale between 1:64 and 1:120. (Note: Approximate. Miniature wargames typically express their scales in terms of the height of a human figurine in millimeters. 1:64 roughly corresponds to 28mm, and 1:120 to 15mm.) At those scales, riflemen should be able to shoot each other from several meters away, (Note: An M1 Garand has an effective range of 457m, which corresponds to 3.8m at a scale of 1:120.) which is longer than most game tables. If model soldiers could shoot each other from opposite ends of the table, without the need to maneuver, the game would be very monotonous. For example, the miniature wargame Bolt Action solves this problem by reducing a rifle's range to 24 inches, a sub-machine gun's range to 12 inches, and a pistol's range to 6 inches. Even if these ranges are not realistic, their proportions make intuitive sense (a rifle's range is longer than a sub-machine gun, due to the differing ammunitions) and thus preserve some verisimilitude, all the while compressing the battle to fit the confines of the table. Additionally, the ranges are multiples of 6, which makes them easier to remember.

=== Fog of war ===
In real warfare, commanders have incomplete information about their enemy and the battlespace. A wargame that conceals some information from the player is called a closed game. An open wargame has no secret information. Most recreational wargames are open wargames. A closed wargame can simulate the espionage and reconnaissance aspects of war.

Military wargames often use referees to manage secret information. The players may be forced to sit in separate rooms, and communicate their orders with the referee in the game room, who in turn reports back only the information he judges the players should know. Some recreational wargames use a referee too, often referring to them as "the GameMaster" (e.g. Warhammer 40,000: Rogue Trader).

The fog of war is easy to simulate in a computer wargame, as a virtual environment is free of the physical constraints of a tabletop game. The computer itself can serve as the referee.

== Format types ==
=== Miniature ===
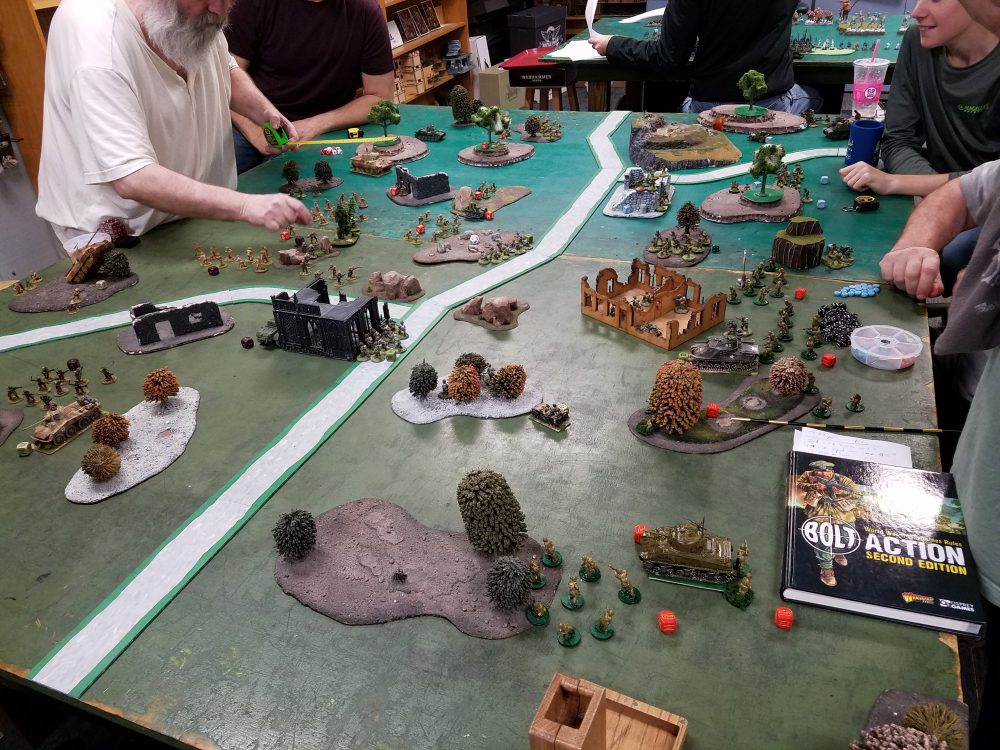
Bolt Action, a miniature wargame set during World War 2

Miniature wargaming is a form of wargaming in which units on the battlefield are represented by miniature models, as opposed to abstract pieces such as wooden blocks or plastic counters. Likewise, the battlefield itself is represented by model terrain, as opposed to a flat board or map; naval wargames are often played on a floor because they tend to require more space than a tabletop. Most miniature wargaming is recreational because issues of scale get in the way of realism.

Miniature wargaming can be more expensive and time-consuming than other forms of wargaming. Furthermore, most manufacturers do not sell ready-to-play models, they sell boxes of model parts, which the players are expected to assemble and paint themselves. This requires skill, time, and money, but many players like the opportunity to show off their artistic skills. Miniature wargaming is often as much about artistry as it is about play.

=== Board ===
A board wargame is played on a board that has a more-or-less fixed layout and is supplied by the game's manufacturer. This is in contrast to customizable playing fields made with modular components, such as in miniature wargaming.

=== Block ===
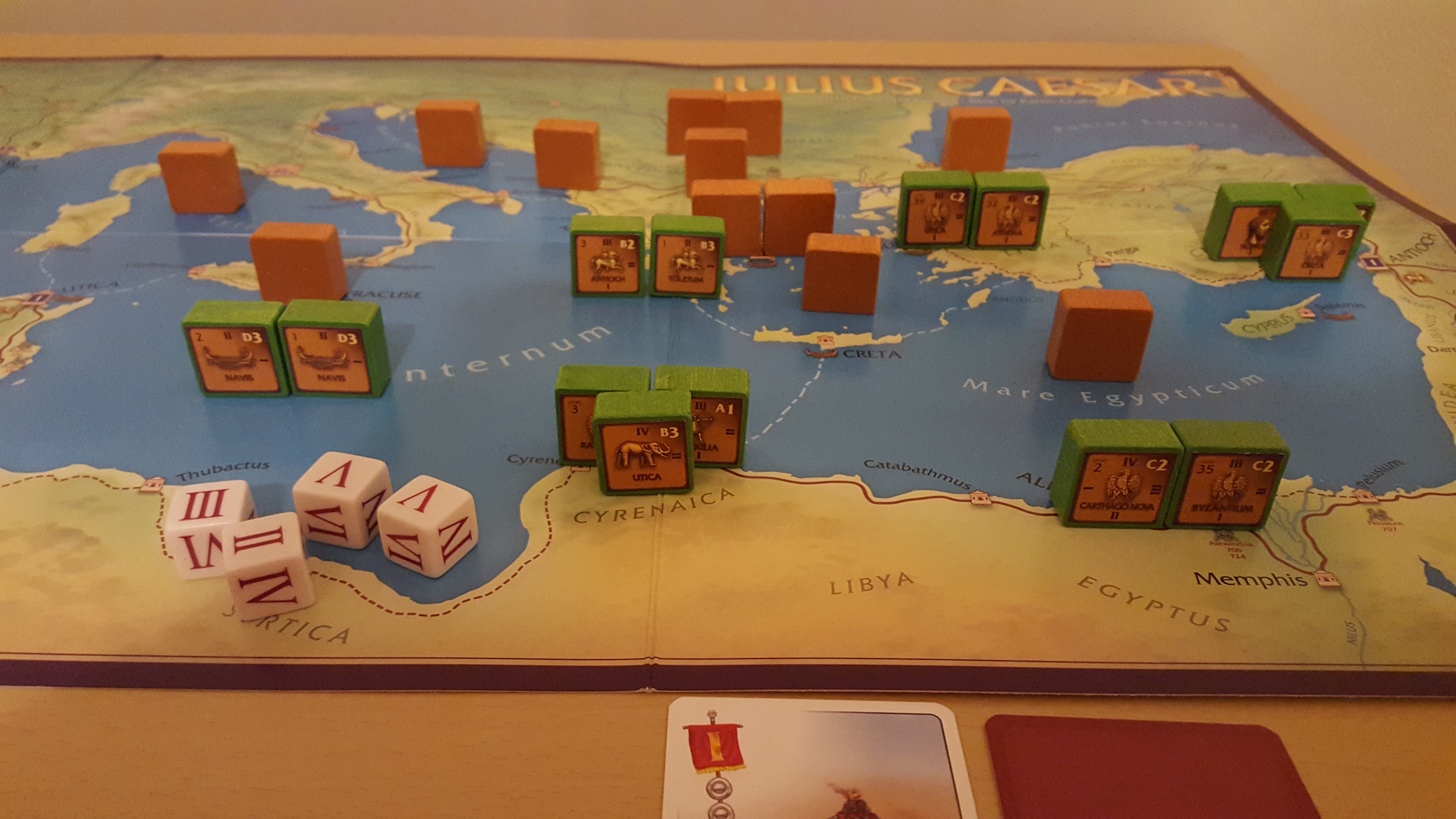
A game of Julius Caesar from Columbia Games shows how a player may only know the strength and unit type of their own forces, creating a fog of war element that does not exist in most tabletop wargames.

In block wargaming, the fog of war is built into the game by representing units with upright wooden blocks that are marked on only one face, which is oriented towards the player who owns the block. The opponent cannot see the markings from his position. The first such block wargame was Quebec 1759 by Columbia Games (previously named Gamma Two Games), depicting the campaign surrounding the Battle of the Plains of Abraham.

=== Card ===
Because of their nature, cards are well suited for abstract games, as opposed to the simulation aspects of wargames. Traditional card games are not considered wargames even when nominally about the same subject (such as the game War).

An early card wargame was Nuclear War, a 'tongue-in-cheek game of the end of the world', first published in 1966 and still published today by Flying Buffalo. It does not simulate how any actual nuclear exchange would happen, but it is still structured unlike most card games because of the way it deals with its subject.

In the late 1970s Battleline Publications (a board wargame company) produced two card games, Naval War and Armor Supremacy. The first was fairly popular in wargaming circles, and is a light system of naval combat, though again not depicting any 'real' situation (players may operate ships from opposing navies side-by-side). Armor Supremacy was not as successful, but is a look at the constant design and development of new types of tanks during World War II.

The most successful card wargame (as a card game and as a wargame) would almost certainly be Up Front, a card game about tactical combat in World War II published by Avalon Hill in 1983. The abstractness is harnessed in the game by having the deck produce random terrain, and chances to fire, and the like, simulating uncertainty as to the local conditions (nature of the terrain, etc.).

Dan Verssen Games is a specialist designer and publisher of card games for several genres, including air combat and World War II and modern land combat.

Also, card driven games (CDGs), first introduced in 1993, use a deck of (custom) cards to drive most elements of the game, such as unit movement (activation) and random events. These are, however, distinctly board games, the deck is merely one of the most important elements of the game.

=== Solitaire ===
An entire class of wargames have been designed to be played exclusively solitaire. The solitaire genre is a relatively recent development: as wargames became more popular, practical limitations of time and location meant that opponents were often limited (if one wishes to re-fight the German invasion of the USSR in 1941, he/she must find an opponent with similar interest, location, time and availability). At the same time, playing "both sides" instead is often seen as less satisfying.

The solitaire genre encompasses the wide range full-throated boxed games with hundreds of pieces and mounted game boards, to magazine formatted titles, to pure card games. Additionally, many publishers have "specialized" in the genre or at least offer a significant collection of purely solitaire options, examples being GMT Games, Fortress Games, Victory Point Games among many others.

Some examples of solitaire wargames by type:

- Traditional complete game (boxed, mounted table-top game board, rulebook, all pieces included): Empires in America, Comancheria, Save South Vietnam!
- Magazine game (comes in magazine or booklet form, played by writing action results on specialized pages, no or very limited pieces): Waterloo Solitaire, Great War Salvo!
- Card game (game mechanism is primarily or entirely driven by drawing and playing cards from a deck or decks of specialized cards): Undaunted Normandy, Warfighter

=== Computer ===
The term "wargame" is rarely used in the video gaming hobby; the term "strategy game" is preferred. "Computer wargame" distinguishes a game from a "tabletop wargame".

Computer wargames have many advantages over traditional wargames. In a computer game, all the routine procedures and calculations are automated. The player needs only to make strategic and tactical decisions. The learning curve for the player is smaller, as the game can be played without mastering all its mechanics. The gameplay is faster, as a computer can process calculations much faster than a human. Computer wargames often have more sophisticated mechanics than traditional wargames thanks to automation. Computer games tend to be cheaper than traditional wargames because, being software, they can be copied and distributed very efficiently. It is easier for a player to find opponents with a computer game: a computer game can use artificial intelligence to provide a virtual opponent, or connect him to another human player over the Internet.

=== Computer-assisted ===
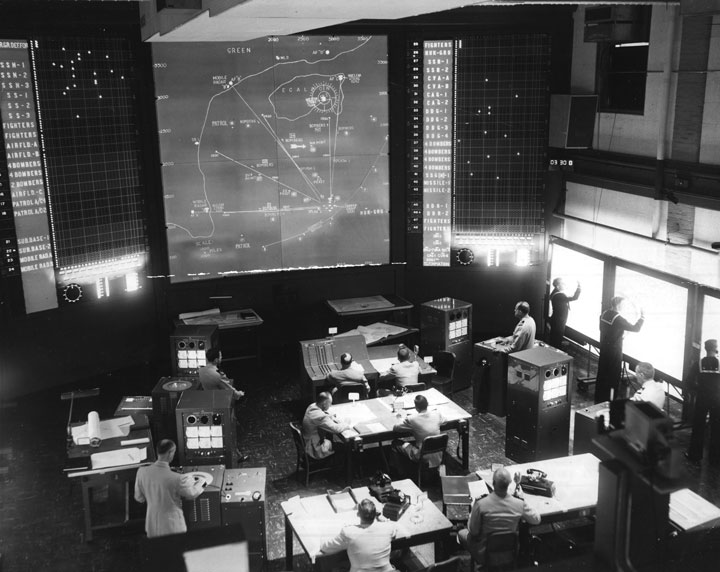
The US Navy Electronic Warfare Simulator (1958)

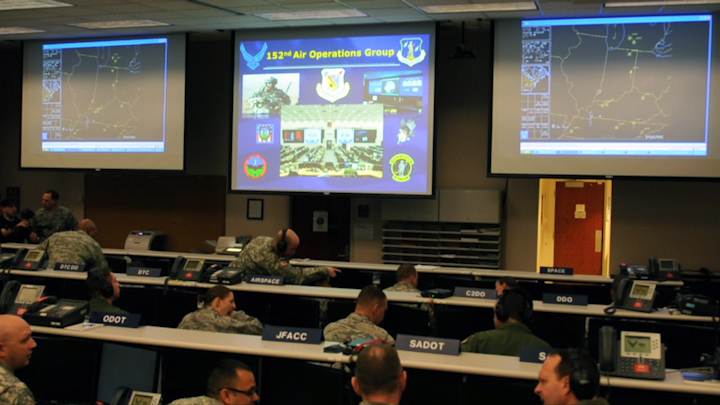
A computer-assisted wargame sponsored by the US Air National Guard (February 2015)

In recent years, programs have been developed for computer-assisted wargaming. Two different categories can be distinguished: local computer assisted wargames and remote computer assisted wargames.

Local computer assisted wargames are mostly not designed toward recreating the battlefield inside computer memory, but employing the computer to play the role of game master by storing game rules and unit characteristics, tracking unit status and positions or distances, animating the game with sounds and voice and resolving combat. Flow of play is simple: each turn, the units come up in a random order. Therefore, the more units an opponent has, the more chance he will be selected for the next turn. When a unit comes up, the commander specifies an order and if offensive action is being taken, a target, along with details about distance. The results of the order, base move distance and effect to target, are reported, and the unit is moved on the tabletop. All distance relationships are tracked on the tabletop. All record-keeping is tracked by the computer.

Remote computer assisted wargames can be considered as extensions to the concept of play-by-email gaming, however the presentation and actual capabilities are completely different. They have been designed to replicate the look and feel of existing board or miniatures wargames on the computer. The map and counters are presented to the user who can then manipulate these, more-or-less as if he were playing the physical game, and send a saved file off to his opponent, who can review what has been done without having to duplicate everything on his physical set-up of the game, and respond. Some allow for both players to get on-line and see each other's moves in real-time.

These systems are generally set up so that while one can play the game, the program has no knowledge of the rules, and cannot enforce them. The human players must have a knowledge of the rules themselves. The idea is to promote the playing of the games (by making play against a remote opponent easier), while supporting the industry (and reducing copyright issues) by ensuring that the players have access to the actual physical game.

The four main programs that can be used to play a number of games each are Aide de Camp, Cyberboard, Vassal and ZunTzu. Aide de Camp is available for purchase, while the other three are offered free. Vassal is in turn an outgrowth of the VASL (Virtual ASL) project, and uses Java, making it accessible to any computer that can run a modern JVM, while the other three are Microsoft Windows programs.

=== Play-by-mail (PBM) ===
Wargames were played remotely through the mail, with players sending lists of moves, or orders, to each other through the mail.

In some early PBM systems, six sided dice rolling was simulated by designating a specific stock and a future date and once that date passed, the players would determine an action's outcome using the sales in hundreds value for specific stocks on a specific date and then dividing the NYSE published sales in hundreds by six, using the remainder as the dice result.

Nuclear Destruction, by the Flying Buffalo, was an early PBM game in 1970. Origins Award Hall-of-Fame member Middle-Earth Play-By-Mail is still active today.

Reality Simulations, Inc. still runs a number of PBM games, such as Duel2 (formerly known as Duelmasters), Hyborian War, and Forgotten Realms: War of the Avatars.

=== Email and traditional ===
Since email is faster than the standard postal service, the rise of the Internet saw a shift of people playing board wargames from play-by-mail (PBM) to play-by-email (PBEM) or play-by-web (PBW). The mechanics were the same, merely the medium was faster.

At this time, turn-based strategy computer games still had a decent amount of popularity, and many started explicitly supporting the sending of saved-game files through email (instead of needing to find the file to send to the opponent by hand). As with all types of video games, the rise in home networking solutions and Internet access has also meant that networked games are now common and easy to set up.

== History ==
=== Early Prussian wargames (1780–1806) ===
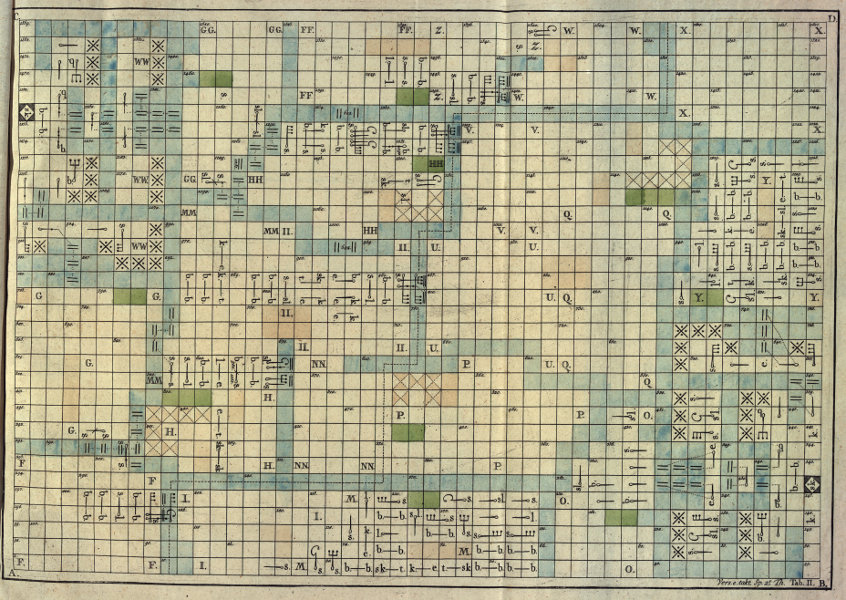
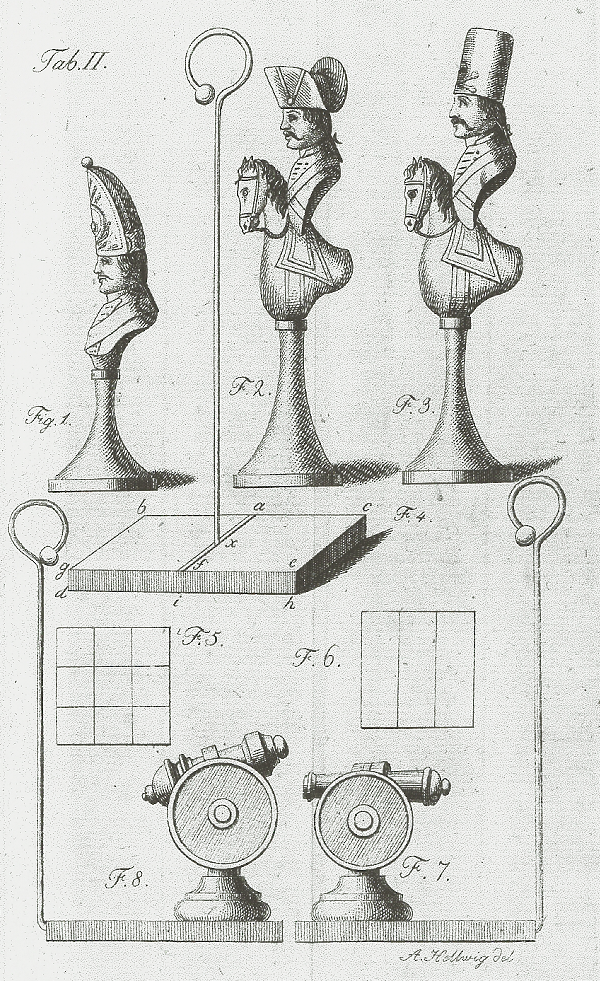
The playing field and pieces from Hellwig's wargame

The first wargame was invented in Prussia in 1780 by Johann Christian Ludwig Hellwig. Hellwig's wargame was the first true wargame because it attempted to be realistic enough to teach useful lessons in military strategy to future army officers. Hellwig was a college professor and many of his students were aristocrats destined for military service. But Hellwig also wanted to sell his wargame commercially as a recreational item. Hellwig chose to base his game on chess so as to make it attractive and accessible to chess players. Hellwig published a second edition of his rulebook in 1803.

As in chess, Hellwig's game was played on a grid of squares, but it was a much larger grid, and the squares were color-coded to represent different types of terrain: mountains, swamp, water, trenches, etc. The layout of the terrain was not fixed, which allowed players to create their own custom battlefields. The pieces in the game represented real military units: cavalry, infantry, artillery, and various support units. As in chess, only a single piece could occupy a square, and the pieces moved square by square, either laterally or diagonally. Over normal terrain, infantry could move a maximum distance of eight squares, dragoons could move twelve squares, and light cavalry could move sixteen squares—intuitively mirroring the speed at which these units move in the real world. But terrain could impede movement: mountains were impassable, swamps slowed units down, rivers could only be crossed with the help of a special pontoon unit, etc. A player could only move one piece per turn, or one group of pieces if they were arranged in a rectangle. A piece could capture an enemy piece by moving into its square, just like in chess, but infantry and artillery pieces could also shoot enemy pieces, at a maximum ranges of two to three squares. Unlike chess, the pieces had orientation: for instance, an infantry piece could only shoot an enemy piece if they were facing it and flanking it. Hellwig's wargame could also simulate the fog of war to limited degree: while the players were arranging their pieces in their starting positions, they had the option of placing a screen across the board so that they could not observe their opponent's arrangement until the game started. Once the game was in progress, however, there was no hiding anything.

Hellwig's wargame was a commercial success, and inspired other inventors to develop their own chess-like wargames. In 1796, another Prussian named Johann Georg Julius Venturini invented his own wargame, inspired by Hellwig's game. Venturini's game was played on an even larger grid. Venturini's game also added rules governing logistics, such as supply convoys and mobile bakeries, and the effects of weather and seasons, making this perhaps the first operational-level wargame. In 1806, an Austrian named Johann Ferdinand Opiz developed a wargame aimed at both civilian and military markets. Like Hellwig's game, it used a modular grid-based board. But unlike Hellwig's game, Opiz's game used dice rolls to simulate the unpredictability of real warfare. This innovation was controversial at the time. Hellwig, who designed his wargame for both leisure as well as instruction, felt that introducing chance would spoil the fun.

A criticism of the chess-like wargames of Hellwig, Venturini, and Opiz was that the pieces were constrained to move across a grid in chess-like fashion. Only a single piece could occupy a square, even if that square represented a square mile; and the pieces had to move square by square, their exact location within a square being immaterial. The grid also forced the terrain into unnatural forms, such as rivers that flowed in straight lines and bent at right angles. This lack of realism meant that no army took these wargames seriously.

=== Kriegsspiel (1824) ===
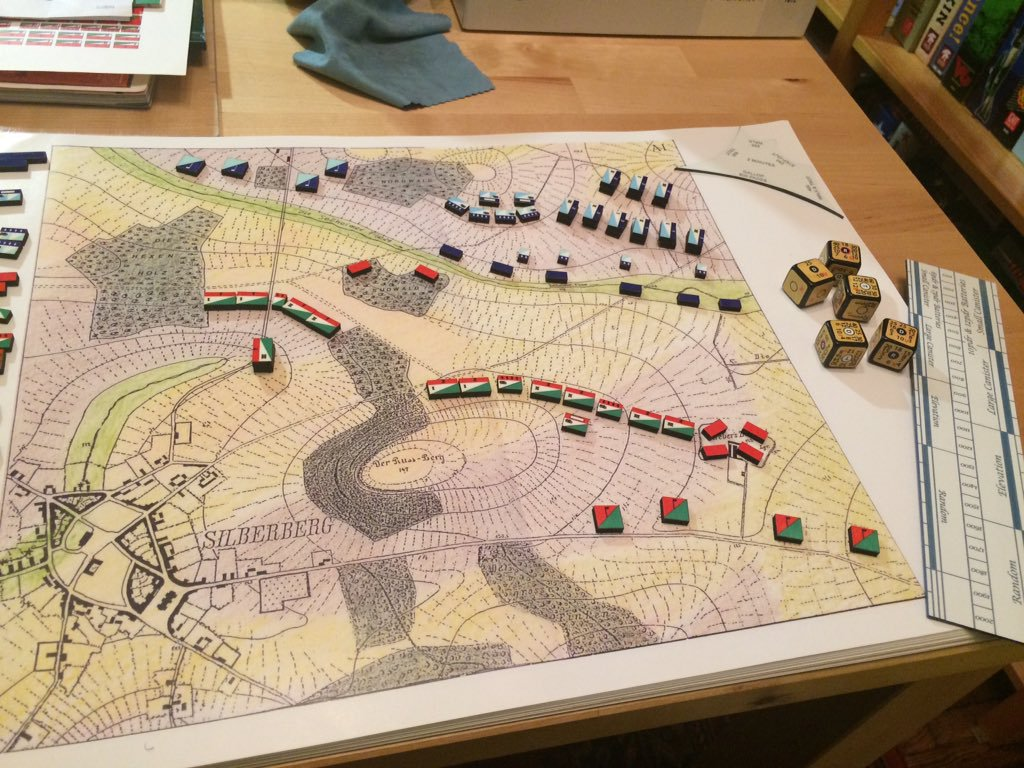
A reconstruction of the wargame developed in 1824 by Reisswitz

In 1824, a Prussian army officer named Georg Heinrich Rudolf Johann von Reisswitz presented to the Prussian General Staff a highly realistic wargame that he and his father had developed over the years. Instead of a chess-like grid, this game was played on accurate paper maps of the kind the Prussian army used. This allowed the game to model terrain naturally and better simulate battles in real locations. The pieces could be moved across the map in a free-form manner, subject to terrain obstacles. The pieces, each of which represented some kind of army unit (an infantry battalion, a cavalry squadron, etc.), were little rectangular blocks made of lead. The pieces were painted either red or blue to indicate the faction it belonged to. The blue pieces were used to represent the Prussian army and red was used to represent some foreign enemy—since then it has been the convention in military wargaming to use blue to represent the faction to which the players actually belong to. The game used dice to add a degree of randomness to combat. The scale of the map was 1:8000 and the pieces were made to the same proportions as the units they represented, such that each piece occupied the same relative space on the map as the corresponding unit did on the battlefield.

The game modeled the capabilities of the units realistically using data gathered by the Prussian army during the Napoleonic Wars. Reisswitz's manual provided tables that listed how far each unit type could move in a round according to the terrain it was crossing and whether it was marching, running, galloping, etc.; and accordingly the umpire used a ruler to move the pieces across the map. The game used dice to determine combat results and inflicted casualties, and the casualties inflicted by firearms and artillery decreased over distance. Unlike chess pieces, units in Reisswitz's game could suffer partial losses before being defeated, which were tracked on a sheet of paper (recreational gamers might call this "hitpoint tracking"). The game also had some rules that modeled morale and exhaustion.

Reisswitz's game also used an umpire. The players did not directly control the pieces on the game map. Rather, they wrote orders for their virtual troops on pieces of paper, which they submitted to the umpire. The umpire then moved the pieces across the game map according to how he judged the virtual troops would interpret and carry out their orders. When the troops engaged the enemy on the map, the umpire rolled the dice, computed the effects, and removed defeated units from the map. The umpire also managed secret information so as to simulate the fog of war. The umpire placed pieces on the map only for those units which he judged both sides could see. He kept a mental track of where the hidden units were, and only placed their pieces on the map when he judged they came into view of the enemy.

Earlier wargames had fixed victory conditions, such as occupying the enemy's fortress. By contrast, Reisswitz's wargame was open-ended. The umpire decided what the victory conditions were, if there were to be any, and they typically resembled the goals an actual army in battle might aim for. The emphasis was on the experience of decision-making and strategic thinking, not on competition. As Reisswitz himself wrote: "The winning or losing, in the sense of a card or board game, does not come into it."

In the English-speaking world, Reisswitz's wargame and its variants are called Kriegsspiel, which is the German word for "wargame".

The Prussian king and the General Staff officially endorsed Reisswitz's wargame, and by the end of the decade every German regiment had bought materials for it. This was thus the first wargame to be widely adopted by a military as a serious tool for training and research. Over the years, the Prussians developed new variations of Reisswitz's system to incorporate new technologies and doctrine.

=== Worldwide spread ===
Prussian wargaming attracted little attention outside Prussia until 1870, when Prussia defeated France in the Franco-Prussian War. Many credited Prussia's victory to its wargaming tradition. The Prussian army did not have any significant advantage in weaponry, numbers, or troop training, but it was the only army in the world that practiced wargaming. Civilians and military forces around the world now took a keen interest in the German military wargames, which foreigners referred to as Kriegsspiel (the German word for "wargame"). The first Kriegsspiel manual in English, based on the system of Wilhelm von Tschischwitz, was published in 1872 for the British army and received a royal endorsement. The world's first recreational wargaming club was the University Kriegspiel [sic] Club, founded in 1873 at Oxford University in England. In the United States, Charles Adiel Lewis Totten published Strategos, the American War Game in 1880, and William R. Livermore published The American Kriegsspiel in 1882, both heavily inspired by Prussian wargames. In 1894, the US Naval War College made wargaming a regular tool of instruction.

=== Miniature wargaming ===
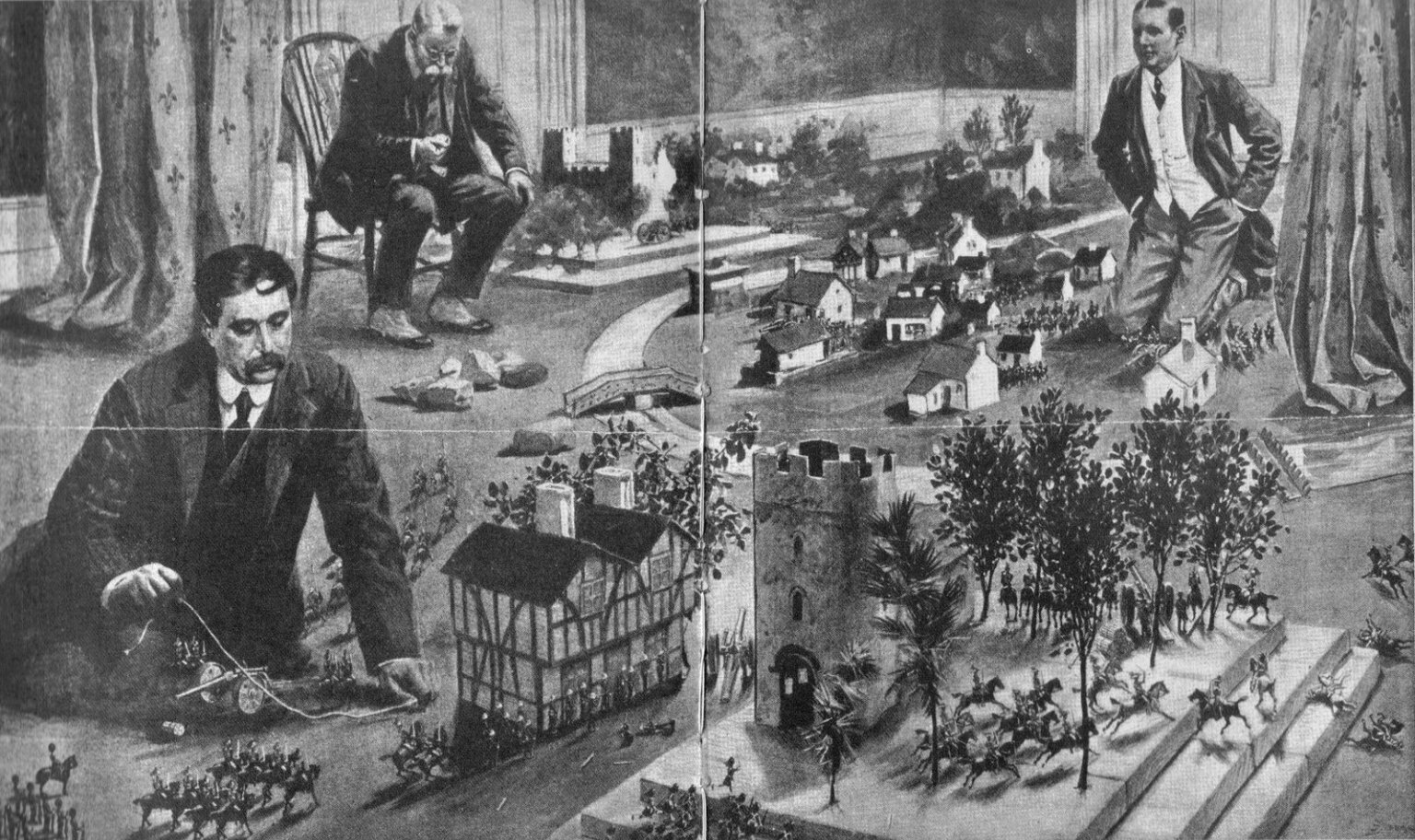
H. G. Wells and his friends playing Little Wars

The English writer H. G. Wells developed codified rules for playing with toy soldiers, which he published in a book titled Little Wars (1913). This is widely remembered as the first rulebook for miniature wargaming (for terrestrial armies, at least). Little Wars had very simple rules to make it fun and accessible to anyone. Little Wars did not use dice or computation to resolve fights. For artillery attacks, players used spring-loaded toy cannons which fired little wooden cylinders to physically knock over enemy models. As for infantry and cavalry, they could only engage in hand-to-hand combat (even if the figurines exhibited firearms). When two infantry units fought in close quarters, the units would suffer non-random losses determined by their relative sizes. Little Wars was designed for a large field of play, such as a lawn or the floor of a large room. An infantryman could move up to one foot per turn, and a cavalryman could move up to two feet per turn. To measure these distances, players used a two-foot long piece of string. Wells was also the first wargamer to use scale models of buildings, trees, and other terrain features to create a three-dimensional battlefield.

Wells' rulebook, however, failed to invigorate the miniature wargaming community. A possible reason was the two World Wars, which de-glamorized war and caused shortages of tin and lead that made model soldiers expensive. Another reason may have been the lack of magazines or clubs dedicated to miniature wargames. Miniature wargaming was seen as a niche within the larger hobby of making and collecting model soldiers.

In 1955, a California man named Jack Scruby began making inexpensive miniature models for miniature wargames out of type metal. Scruby's major contribution to the miniature wargaming hobby was to network players across America. At the time, the miniature wargaming community was minuscule, and players struggled to find each other. In 1956, Scruby organized the first miniature wargaming convention in America, which was attended by just fourteen people. From 1957 to 1962, he self-published the world's first wargaming magazine, titled The War Game Digest, through which wargamers could publish their rules and share game reports. It had less than two hundred subscribers, but it did establish a steadily growing community.

Around the same time in the United Kingdom, Donald Featherstone began writing an influential series of books on wargaming, which represented the first mainstream published contribution to wargaming since Little Wars. Titles included : War Games (1962), Advanced Wargames, Solo Wargaming, Wargame Campaigns, Battles with Model Tanks, Skirmish Wargaming. Such was the popularity of such titles that other authors were able to have published wargaming titles. This output of published wargaming titles from British authors coupled with the emergence at the same time of several manufacturers providing suitable wargame miniatures (e.g. Miniature Figurines, Hinchliffe, Peter Laing, Garrisson, Skytrex, Davco, Heroic & Ros) was responsible for the huge upsurge of popularity of the hobby in the late 1960s and into the 1970s.

In 1956, Tony Bath published what was the first ruleset for a miniature wargame set in the medieval period. These rules were a major inspiration for Gary Gygax's Chainmail (1971), which in turn became the basis for the roleplaying game Dungeons & Dragons.

From 1983 to 2015, Games Workshop produced what was the first miniature wargame designed to be used with proprietary models: Warhammer Fantasy. Earlier miniature wargames were designed to be played using generic models that could be bought from any manufacturer, but Warhammer Fantasy's setting featured original characters with distinctive visual designs, and their models were produced exclusively by Games Workshop.

=== Board wargaming (1954–present) ===
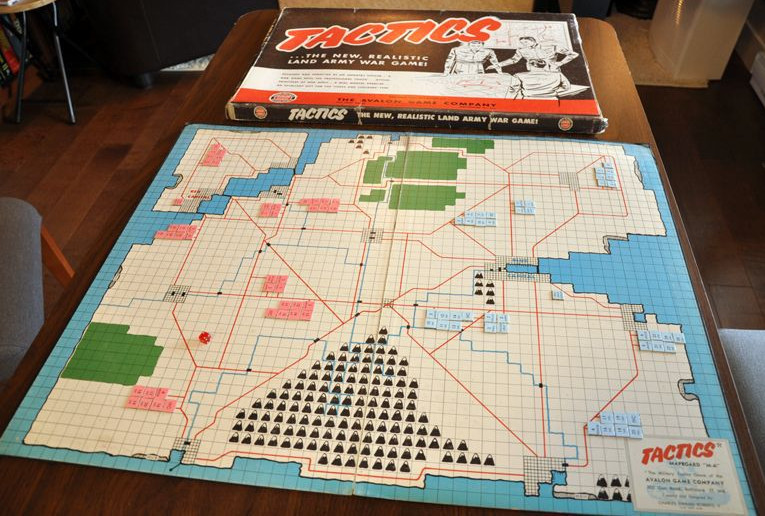
Tactics (1954) was the first successful board wargame.

The first successful commercial board wargame was Tactics (1954) by an American named Charles S. Roberts. What distinguished this wargame from previous ones is that it was mass-produced and all the necessary materials for play were bundled together in a box. Previous wargames were often just a rulebook and required players to obtain the other materials themselves. The game was played on a pre-fabricated board with a fixed layout, which is why it was called a board game.

Roberts later founded the Avalon Hill Game Company, the first firm that specialized in commercial wargames. In 1958, Avalon Hill released Gettysburg, which was a retooling of the rules of Tactics, and was based on the historical Battle of Gettysburg. Gettysburg became the most widely played wargame yet.

Board wargames were more popular than miniature wargames. One reason was that assembling a playset for miniature wargaming was expensive, time-consuming, and require artisanal skill. Another reason was that board wargames could be played by correspondence. Board wargames were usually grid-based, or else designed in some way that moves could be explained in writing in simple terms. This was not possible with the free-form nature of miniature wargames.

== Notable people ==
=== Wargaming as a hobby ===
- Georg von Reisswitz, who with his father invented Kriegsspiel.
- H.G. Wells – Pioneer in miniature wargaming, author of Little Wars. His usual companion in wargames was Jerome K. Jerome (of Three Men in a Boat fame).
- Jack Scruby – After H.G. Wells, he did the most to make miniature wargaming a respectable hobby. He also popularized miniatures wargaming with a cheaper production process for miniature figures, publishing the first miniature wargaming magazine, the War Game Digest, and community building.
- Don Featherstone – Known in the UK as the "co-father" of modern miniature wargaming.
- Charles S. Roberts – Known in the US as the "Father of modern board wargaming", designed the first modern wargame, as well as the company most identified with modern wargames (Avalon Hill).
- Phil Barker – Co-founder of (Wargames Research Group), co writer of WRG Ancients in 1969 and of DBA the innovative 1990 ruleset.

=== Designers/developers ===
- Richard Berg – Designer of Terrible Swift Sword, and worked at SPI.
- Larry Bond – Designer of Harpoon, and best selling author
- Frank Chadwick – A co-founder of Game Designers Workshop (along with Loren Wiseman, Marc Miller, and Rich Banner), one of the first major competitors to Avalon Hill, and himself a prolific wargame designer and innovator.
- Jim Dunnigan – considered "The Dean of Modern Wargaming", founder of SPI and the most prolific print wargame designer in history. His designs included many firsts in wargaming, including the first tactical wargames.
- Charles Grant – Author of The Wargame.
- E. Gary Gygax – Designer of several miniatures and board wargames who went on to co-create (with Dave Arneson) and publish Dungeons & Dragons.
- Larry Harris – Designer of Axis and Allies, Conquest of the Empire, and other games in the Axis and Allies Series.
- Bruce Quarrie – wrote rule sets for Napoleonic and World War II wargames and also on military history.
- John Hill – Designer of Squad Leader, Johnny Reb, and other well-received designs.
- Redmond A. Simonsen – Co-founder of SPI and introduced many advanced graphics design elements to wargame designs.

=== Notable players ===
- Peter Cushing – Actor
- Curt Schilling – Former baseball player and commentator

== Notable examples ==
=== Board ===
While a comprehensive list will show the variety of titles, the following games are notable for the reasons indicated:

- Diplomacy (1954) – a classic multi-player game from the "golden age" of wargames in which strategy is exercised off the game board as well as on it.
- Tactics II (Avalon Hill, 1958) – the wargame that launched Avalon Hill.
- Risk (Parker Brothers, 1959) – Widely accepted as the first mainstream wargame.
- Gettysburg (Avalon Hill, 1958) – the first modern era wargame intended to model an actual historical event.
- Tactical Game 3 (Strategy & Tactics Magazine game, 1969); re-released as PanzerBlitz by Avalon Hill in 1970. The very first tactical wargame. The game pioneered the use of "geomorphic mapboards" and PanzerBlitz was a game system rather than just a game in that forces could be used to depict any number of actual tactical situations rather than one specific scenario. Pioneered several ground-breaking features, such as use of various types of weapons fire to reflect battlefield conditions. Also created new level of realism in reflecting tactical armored vehicles.
- Quebec 1759 (Columbia Games, 1972) – The first wargame to use wooden blocks with labels to provide a fog of war and four possible steps of strength.
- Sniper! (SPI, 1973) – along with Patrol, the first Man to Man wargames in which game pieces depicted a single soldier. An adaptation of Sniper! also became one of the first multi-player computer wargames.
- Wooden Ships and Iron Men (Battleline Publications, 1974 Avalon Hill, 1976) – the definitive game of Age of Sail warfare for many years.
- Rise and Decline of the Third Reich (Avalon Hill, 1974) – The first serious attempt to model World War II in Europe in its entirety, including (in a limited way) the economic and industrial production of the nations involved. It has seen numerous versions and editions, and is currently available as John Prados' Third Reich from Avalanche Press, and as a far more complex descendant game, A World At War, published by GMT Games.
- La Bataille de la Moscowa (Martial Enterprises, 1974) Later republished by Games Designers Workshop and Clash of Arms. With 4 maps and 1000+ counters, it is credited with being the first "monster" wargame (by famed designer Richard Berg.)
- SPQR (GMT Games, 1992)
- Squad Leader (Avalon Hill, 1977) and Advanced Squad Leader (1985) have become the most prolific series of wargames, including 3 add-on modules for the former, and 12 for the latter, with additional Historical modules and Deluxe modules also having been released. ASL also sets the record for sheer volume of playing components, with thousands of official counters and 60+ "geomorphic mapboards" not counting Deluxe and Historical maps.
- Star Fleet Battles (Task Force Games, 1978) – one of the older still actively played and published wargames today; based on Star Trek, it is arguably the most successful tactical space combat system that does not rely on miniatures (published by Amarillo Design Bureau).
- Storm Over Arnhem (Avalon Hill, 1981) – pioneered the use of "point to point" or "area movement" in tactical wargames.
- Axis & Allies (Nova Games, 1981) – the most successful of Milton Bradley's (1984) 'GameMaster' line in an attempt to bring wargaming into the mainstream by appealing to non-wargamers through simplicity and attractive components.
- Ambush! (Victory Games, 1983) – the first solitaire board wargame depicting man to man combat, in which each game piece represented a single person.
- Blue Max (GDW, 1983) – is a multi-player game of World War I aerial combat over the Western Front during 1917 and 1918 with an extremely easy to play mechanism but allow the development of complex strategies.
- We the People (Avalon Hill, 1994) – this game started the Card-Driven wargame movement, which is very influential in current wargame design.

=== Miniature ===
- Rules for the Jane Naval War Game (S. Low, Marston, 1898) – The first published miniature wargame. A 26-page rule set limited to naval miniature battles. It came in a crate measuring 4 ft. X 4 ft. X 2 ft. Written by Fred Jane. As only a handful of these games survive, they are highly collectible.
- Little Wars (H. G. Wells, 1913) – The first popular published wargame rules. Includes the common miniature wargaming mechanics of dice rolling, range, line of sight, and moving in alternate turns. This game earned Wells the title "The Father of Miniature Wargaming".
- Miniature Wargames du temps de Napoleon (John C. Candler, 1964) – First period-specific historical miniature wargame. Also the first in a long line of Napoleonic miniature wargames.
- Chainmail (Guidon Games, 1971) – An extension and distillation of rules previously published in various periodicals. While mostly about historical medieval combat, it had an addendum that covered fantasy elements. Major elements of this game were adopted by the role-playing game Dungeons & Dragons. Unlike Dungeons & Dragons, Chainmail used two six-sided dice to resolve combat. Previous fantasy miniature wargames had been written, but this was the first one published. Drawing on the popularity of The Lord of the Rings, this game featured the novelties of combat magic and fantastic creatures as combatants.
- Warhammer Fantasy Battle (Games Workshop, 1983) – An internationally successful fantasy miniature wargame. The First Edition rules introduced innovative open unit design rules, however later editions eliminated the option to build custom units and make use of standard army lists mandatory. Warhammer was one of the first newly developed miniature wargames to enjoy popularity after role-playing games came to market in 1974. In fact, it is because of Roleplaying games becoming so popular, and people having too many models that were rarely used, that this was first published.
- Warhammer 40,000 (Games Workshop, 1987) – A futuristic wargame featuring rival armies with different fighting styles. This wargame has very conceptual artwork suggesting a post-apocalyptic neo-gothic universe with heavy dystopic themes. Unarguably the most profitable miniature wargame ever, it has popularized competitive tournament gameplay in large, international events sanctioned by Games Workshop.
- De Bellis Antiquitatis (Wargames Research Group, 1990) – Radically minimalist rules differentiate this game from other notable miniature wargames. A number of systems have been strongly influenced by DBA.
- Mage Knight (WizKids Inc., 2001) – Innovative game popularizing the combat dial, pre-painted plastic miniatures, and the collectible miniatures games. Mage Knight has inspired numerous collectible, skirmish miniature wargames.
- Warmachine (Privateer Press, 2003) – A steampunk-inspired miniatures game featuring steam-powered robots fighting under the direction of powerful wizards. Also has a sister game, Hordes, which features large monstrous creatures in the place of robots.
- Heroscape (Milton Bradley Company, 2004) – An inexpensive, simple wargame that has been successfully mass marketed to both younger wargamers and adults. As miniature wargaming is often an expensive hobby, Heroscape and the collectible miniatures games have opened the miniature wargaming hobby to a new demographic.
- Infinity (Corvus Belli, 2005) is a tabletop wargame in which sci-fi themed with 28mm scale metal miniatures are used to simulate futuristic skirmishes.
- BrikWars is a wargame that uses Lego bricks as miniatures and scenery and gained popularity mostly due to the looseness of the rules.
- Flames of War (Battlefront Miniatures, 2002) – Popular World War II wargame at 15mm (1:100) scale, currently focusing on the European and Mediterean theatres. Splits into three time periods (Early War 1939–41, Mid War 1942–43 and Late War 1944–45) to bring some balance and historical matchups.
- Malifaux

See also List of miniature wargames.

=== Computer ===
- Wars (Nintendo and Intelligent Systems, with Kuju Entertainment) – a series of turn-based wargames released for the Nintendo Entertainment System, SNES, Game Boy, Game Boy Advance, GameCube, Wii, DS and Switch, respectively, featuring a cartoony aesthetic and grid based gameplay. Intelligent Systems would subsequently adapt the traditional wargaming formula into the popular Fire Emblem series of tactical role-playing video games.
- Panzer General (Strategic Simulations, Inc., 1994) – probably the most widely popular computer game that is recognizably a traditional wargame. It spawned several sequels, some of which explored different subject matter.
- Steel Panthers (Strategic Simulations, Inc., 1995) – an early tactical wargame on the same scale as Squad Leader, which led to two sequels, and a complete revision of the title for free release.
- Close Combat (Microsoft, 1996) – not the first wargame to break out from hexes, and still presented in a 2-dimensional format, Close Combat nonetheless uniquely addressed factors such as individual morale and reluctance to carry out orders. The original title led to five very successful sequels for the general public, as well as being developed into a training tool for military use only. Close Combat stemmed from an early attempt to translate the Squad Leader boardgame to the computer.
- Combat Mission (Big Time Software, 2000) – not the first 3D tactical wargame (titles such as Muzzle Velocity preceded it), but a groundbreaking game series featuring simultaneous order resolution, complete orders of battle for numerous nationalities, with three titles based on the original game engine. As of 2006, a campaign layer is in testing as well as a revised game engine to be released before 2007. CM's genesis was also as a failed attempt by Avalon Hill to translate Squad Leader to the computer.
- TacOps (Major I. L. Holdridge, 2003 for v4) – commercial version of TacOpsCav 4, an officially issued standard training device of the US Army. It is a simulation of contemporary and near-future tactical, ground, combat between the modern armed forces of the world.
- Wargame: Red Dragon (Eugen Systems, 2014) – a 3D regiment or brigade scale simulation set as a "Cold War Gone Hot" themed game in both multiplayer and singleplayer environments. Players construct customized armies through use of a deck system comprising land vehicles, infantry, and helicopters from several NATO and Warsaw Pact nations and manage logistics such as fuel and ammunition while on the battlefield. There is no cohesive campaign, the game instead taking place in several hypothetical conflicts.
- Total War – a wargame set in different time periods, with a turn based map, and a real time battle component, featured on the television series Time Commanders
- Hearts of Iron (Paradox Interactive, 2002) − a grand strategy wargame series that is focused on World War 2. Player may act as any reasonably sized nation at the time, influencing international politics, economic and military development, and can control battlefields on both strategic and operational levels using combined arms. Frequently used to entertain and simulate alternative history scenarios as well as recreate historical events.
- Hegemony (Longbow Games) – a historical real-time strategy series with real-time tactical combat and supply simulation. Campaigning takes place on a single continuous map where players can zoom between the 3D tactical map and the 2D strategy map at any time.
- Command: Modern Operations (Warfare Sims, 2019) - a tactical wargame that features real-time, unit-level tactical combat and a database of global military hardware from post-WWII to the near future. While it includes some scenarios, the software focuses primarily on user-created content. Gameplay uses a 2D global map.

=== Unique game systems ===
- Ace of Aces (Nova Games, 1980) – this flip-book system is a simulation of aerial dogfighting.
- BattleTech (FASA, 1984) – initially conceived as a board game, it has created a brand that now includes various different boardgames (tactical as well as strategic), miniature game rules, a role-playing game, computer games, flip-book games (by Nova Games) as well as novels and a TV series.
- Car Wars (Steve Jackson Games, 1982) – initially printed as a board game, it quickly evolved to incorporate elements of miniatures games.
- Up Front (Avalon Hill, 1983) – A popular card wargame.

== See also ==
- Air wargaming
- Business war games
- International Wargames Federation
- List of wargame publishers
- Miniature wargaming
- Naval wargaming
- Tactical wargame

== Bibliography ==
- Shawn Burns, ed. (2013). War Gamers' Handbook: A Guide for Professional War Gamers (PDF). US Naval War College. Archived (PDF) from the original on July 28, 2018.
- Matthew B. Caffrey Jr. (2019). On Wargaming: How Wargames Have Shaped History and How They May Shape the Future. The Newport Papers 43. Naval War College Press. ISBN 978-1-935352-65-5.
- Tristan Donovan (2017). It's All a Game: The History of Board Games from Monopoly to Settlers of Catan. Macmillan. ISBN 9781250082732.
- James F. Dunnigan (1992). The Complete Wargames Handbook Revised Edition. William Morrow. ISBN 0-688-10368-5.
- Pat Harrigan; Matthew G. Kirschenbaum, eds. (2016). Zones of Control: Perspectives on Wargaming. MIT Press. ISBN 9780262033992.
- "Foreign War Games". Selected Professional Papers Translated from European Military Publications. Translated by H. O. S. Heistand. Washington, D.C.: US Government Printing Office. 1898. pp. 233–289.
- Johann Christian Ludwig Hellwig (1803). Das Kriegsspiel [The Wargame].
- Nohr, Rolf F.; Böhme, Stefan (2009). Die Auftritte des Krieges sinnlich machen. Appelhans-Verlag Braunschweig. ISBN 978-3-941737-02-0.
- Peter P. Perla (2012) [1st pub. 1990]. John Curry (ed.). Peter Perla's The Art of Wargaming: A Guide for Professionals and Hobbyists. The History of Wargaming Project. ISBN 978-1-4716-2242-7.
- Perla, Peter P.; Barrett, Raymond T. (1985). An Introduction to Wargaming and its Uses (PDF). Archived (PDF) from the original on March 5, 2020.
- Jon Peterson (2012). Playing at the World: A History of Simulating Wars, People and Fantastic Adventures, from Chess to Role-playing Games. Unreason Press. ISBN 9780615642048.
- Rick Priestley; John Lambshead (2016). Tabletop Wargames: A Designers' and Writers' Handbook. Pen & Sword Books Limited. ISBN 9781783831487.
- Paul Schuurman (2017). "Models of war 1770–1830: the birth of wargames and the trade-off between realism and simplicity". History of European Ideas. 43 (5): 442–455. doi:10.1080/01916599.2017.1366928. hdl:1765/101998.
- Michael J. Tresca (2011). The Evolution of Fantasy Role-Playing Games. McFarland. ISBN 9780786460090.
- Martin van Creveld (2013). Wargames: From Gladiators to Gigabytes. Cambridge University Press. ISBN 9781107036956.
- Vego, Milan (2012). "German War Gaming". Naval War College Review. 65 (4).
- Phillip von Hilgers (2000). "Eine Anleitung zur Anleitung. Das Takstische Kriegsspiel 1812-1824" (PDF). Board Games Studies: International Journal for the Study of Board Games (in German) (3): 59–78. Archived from the original (PDF) on 2009-07-10.
- Georg Heinrich Rudolf Johann von Reisswitz (1824). Anleitung zur Darstellung militairische Manover mit dem Apparat des Kriegsspiel [Instructions for the Representation of Military Maneuvres with the Kriegsspiel Apparatus] (in German). (translation by Bill Leeson, 1989)
- George Leopold von Reiswitz (1812). Taktisches Kriegs-Spiel oder Anleitung zu einer mechanischen Vorrichtung um taktische Manoeuvres sinnlich darzustellen [Tactical War Game - or, instruction to a mechanical device to simulate tactical maneuvers]. Gädicke.
- H. G. Wells (1913). Little Wars.
