= Tony Bath =

British game designer (1926–2000)

Tony Bath (1926–2000) was a British wargamer who favored the ancient period. He was the founder of the Society of Ancients.

== Life ==
Tony Bath was born in Southampton. After serving in World War II, he began collecting military figures. In 1955, he joined the British Model Soldier Society.

When Bath began playing wargames set in the ancient period, the only miniatures available were German flats which were difficult to procure. As the period became more popular with hobbyists, Bath's rules were the ones most often used in ancient wargames. In 1966, Featherstone published Bath's rules for ancient, medieval, and 18th century warfare in three separate pamphlets, part of a set of rulebooks covering eight historical epochs.

Bath founded the Society of Ancients in 1965. In 1973, his Setting up a Wargames Campaign was published by the Wargames Research Group. He worked as an administrative manager for Miniature Figurines, Ltd., helping them expand their selection of ancient and medieval miniatures.

== The Tony Bath Rules ==
They have been described by Kevin Large as "not intended for aggressive competitive play, but for a fast moving enjoyable game". The earliest version that survives is the version in Donald Featherstone's book, War Games. Phil Barker claimed this version to be his "second favorite" ancients ruleset but considered the ruleset to have lost some of its appeal as later versions became more complex.

The rules were written to be played with flats (thin model soldiers, virtually two dimensional) and when solid figures became dominant he was slow to adapt the rules as he had written them first of all for his personal use. Some see this as a key reason that other rule sets became dominant. This is, however, disputed by others on the grounds that the Bath rules continued to be played extensively for a time after flats had been made obsolete by solids.

He wrote a version of his rules designed for solid figures which was published as "Peltast and Pila" in 1976. In those rules, Tony Bath did adapt to the trends of rules of the time while still keeping his basic style. In the tradeoff between historical accuracy and playability, Phil Barker considered Tony Bath to have firmly chosen the side of playability. The basing was compatible with the frontages of WRG of that time though differed slightly in respect of base depth. The rules for terrain were especially detailed as were the rules for street fighting.

The rules mixed dicing for groups to inflict hits along with individual saving throws to decide how many hits became kills.

Tony Bath wrote an extension to his rules to cover naval warfare which was published as a supplement to the Society of Ancients Rules in 1968 and also appears in Donald Featherstone's Naval Wargames.

== Book ==
His key works on wargaming have been collated in the book Tony Bath's Ancient Wargaming This is a collaboration between the Society of Ancients Society of Ancients and The History of Wargaming Project.
