= Seastrike =

Naval wargame

- Original manila envelope packaging
- Designers: Robin Wyatt
- Publishers: Wargames Research Group
- Publication: 1974
- Genres: Naval

Seastrike is a board wargame published by the British company Wargames Research Group (WRG) in 1974 that simulates naval combat.

== Description ==
Seastrike is a 2-player board wargame using a variety of ships, aircraft and other technology of the mid-1970s. Unlike other contemporary board wargames that use hex grid maps to regulate movement, Seastrike uses rules more akin to traditional miniature wargaming, using any flat surface as the board, and measuring distances and calculating movement using rulers.

=== Gameplay ===
The two players select one of the 18 provided scenarios. Each player is randomly given a secret game objective, and a budget with which to buy the naval equipment they feel they will need to complete their objective. Islands are placed on the playing surface in accordance with the scenario.

Types of ships vary from patrol boats and submarines to cruisers. Players can also purchase missile sites, helicopters and strike aircraft, each of which have different offensive capabilities.

Once the scenario has started, each player's game objective remains secret, but both players reveal the equipment that makes up their strike force. The order of movement alternates each turn:

1. Player A, Player B
2. Player B, Player A
3. Player A, Player B, etc.

Pieces are moved distances calculated with a supplied ruler. Likewise, weapon ranges are calculated using a ruler. A system of "Chance" cards is used to calculate damage from weapon fire.

A table of hull and weapons values is also provided so that players can design their own ships.

== Publication history ==
Seastrike started as a game designed by Robin Wyatt in 1961 using matchsticks and playing cards. Wyatt continued to develop and refine the game through the 1960s, producing a playable naval combat game with model ships in 1967. But in the real world, the addition at this time of new naval weapons systems, particularly guided missiles, caused Wyatt to scrap this version and start designing a more modern game from scratch. In 1973, WRG expressed interest in Wyatt's redeveloped game, and Wyatt finalized his design in late 1973. The result was published by WRG in 1974 as a game packaged in a manila envelope printed with the title of the game fashioned to look like a military briefing envelope. Ariel Productions republished it as a boxed set in 1977.

== Reception ==
In the September 1974 edition of Airfix Magazine, Bruce Quarrie commented, "There are a large number of variables to consider at each stage of a move in this game, calling for very careful tactical thought within each player’s broad objectives. and the game rapidly becomes completely absorbing." Quarrie liked the fact that the counters representing ships could easily be replaced by small-scale models, and that players could design their own ships and scenarios. Quarrie concluded, "All in all Seastrike represents excellent value for money, and something completely different which will appeal to all wargamers even if they normally fight land battles and different periods."

In Issue 33 of the British magazine Games & Puzzles, E.W. Solomon called the rulebook "well presented", but found the ship movement ruler "far too flexible for accurate play." Solomon was also disturbed by the "high incidence of 'sudden death' major hits. Any surface-to-surface missile launched stands a one-in-four chance of completely destroying its target [except large cruisers]." Solomon concluded by giving the game an overall rating of 4 out of 6, noting the many optional rules "would seem to be somewhat nullified by the 'all or none' nature of the damage assessment."

In Issue 15 of Perfidious Albion, Paul Blackwell liked the lack of a hex grid, calling this "more a miniature game than a board game, especially as it does not have a board." Blackwell especially liked the "Decision" phase of the game, where each player must design a strike force to fulfill their game objective. Blackwell concluded, "To sum it up, a good game, quick to play, and interesting, every game is different. Well written rules, examples of play and an inventive system of mechanics. I recommend it as a change from change from regular hexagon bound games." In Issue 22, Andrew Smith called this "not much of a simulation, but it is a delightful game ... it seems to me that Seastrike is in the best tradition of iconoclastic British board game design ... emphasising subtlety at the expense of detail and accuracy."
