= War Games Rules 1925–1950 =

War Games Rules 1925-1950 (1988 Edition)

A set of rules for World War II and the immediate post-war years, for scales from 1:300 micro armour (company level or higher, as a general guide) to 1:72 (platoon level) scale, published by Wargames Research Group (WRG).

They were first published in 1973 as a development of the 1972 rules "War Games Rules Infantry Action 1925–1975", and later split into two eras covering 1925–1950, and 1950–2000.

The variations, as published by WRG, are set out in the table:

Year	Title
1972	War Games Rules Infantry Action 1925–1975
1973	War Games Rules Armour & Infantry 1925–1950
1974	War Games Rules Armour & Infantry 1950–1975
1979	War Games Rules for Armoured Warfare 1950–1985
1988	War Games Rules 1925–1950: Wargames Rules for All Arms Land Warfare from Platoon to Battalion Level
1993	War Games Rules 1950–2000: Wargames Rules for All Arms Land Warfare from Platoon to Battalion Level

A computer-moderated adaptation of the 1988 edition was created by WargameSystems. This is claimed to preserve the WRG rules structure and key data while the software automates the mechanics of playing by these rules, hence saving time and increasing enjoyment of the game.

== Core rules summary ==
Philosophy

Paraphrasing from the author's introduction:

"The rules cover the period from the introduction of the fast tank until the introduction of ATGM, AFV range-finders and accurate APDS... the emphasis is on tactics, terrain, command and control... These rules are set in the real world of rain and mud, dust and mirage. The battles they simulate are not fought by nicely painted models but by men who are tired, frightened, dirty and often cold and hungry... Equipment performance and troop capabilities are based on those reported by real fighting units, rather than theoretical or artificial sources... differences in combat effectiveness that are not substantiated by careful research or that are insignificant compared with random factors are given only the attention they deserve."

Sequence of play

Alternate.

Time scale

One friendly and one enemy move per five minutes. Each move partly overlaps moves preceding and succeeding it.

Ground scale

Varies depending on the figure scale.

Troop scale

One figure represents one real equivalent. Infantry figures are based together in elements of 2 or 3 to 6.

Dice

One six sided dice is used throughout the rules.

Command and control

Orders were exclusively verbal. The divisional commander made his decision for the next day during the evening, and he gave the necessary orders verbally to his regimental commanders on the battlefield; then he returned to his main headquarters and discussed his intentions with the chief of staff of the 48th Panzer Corps. If approval was obtained the regiments were sent the wireless message: "no changes," and all the moves were carried out according to plan. If there were fundamental changes, the divisional commander visited all his regiments during the night and gave the necessary orders, again verbally.

— von Mellenthin FW Major General, Panzer Battles: A Study of the Employment of Armour in the Second World War, Futura, London, 1977

Each company (and if necessary, platoon) is given a one word order—Recce, Probe, Attack, Defend, Delay or Support—that specifies its task and imposes any tactical limitations. Some orders require additional information such as an objective, a line of advance, or boundaries.

Orders can be changed during a battle by passing the new order(s) through the chain of command.

Communication

Command elements can communicate once with a superior command element, three times with subordinate command elements, and with all directly subordinate elements.

Range and effectiveness depends on method—Personal, Line, Radio, Written, Signal.

Troop quality

Troops are classified as Inept, Green, Stubborn, Dashing, Skilled, Thrusting, Fanatic or Irregular. These classifications can restrict choice of Tactical Modes (explained hereafter) and also govern reactions to casualties and overrun situations.

Tactical Modes

Command elements can choose how to fulfil their orders by declaring a Tactical Mode – Salvo, Hold, March, Attack, Assault, Dash, Stalk, Skirmish, Slow, or Gap. Each Tactical Mode has its own movement and firing specifications.

An element's choice of a Tactical Mode can be restricted by orders, troop classification, terrain and combat results.

Exigency Modes

These are the same as Tactical Modes except that they are imposed while specific circumstances apply, such as being shot at. When these cease, elements revert to their Tactical Modes.

Firing

For direct fire, first dice to check for full or partial acquisition, specify the type of fire—Aimed, Volley, Suppressive—then dice to see if the fire is effective.

"Captain Walter took over the command of C squadron (23rd Hussars Armoured Regiment) when the squadron leader was killed. He won a Distinguished Service Order for his rallying of the tanks and the stubborn fight he conducted, including the destruction of a counterattack with artillery fire, which he called in by saying "Hello this is Peter Walter, I need some artillery fire," on the BBC frequency. The BBC relayed the message."

— Sweet JT, Mounting the Threat: The Battle of Bourguebus Ridge 18–23 July 1944,
Presido Press, San Rafael, California, 1977

Area fire is not dissimilar to the above except that -

- Area fire resources are allocated Under Command, In Direct Support, In General Support, to Counterbattery, or at Priority Call. These classifications determine responsiveness to requests for fire support (which may not always be approved when required and may sometimes be supplemented by additional firers).
- Firing tasks are defined as Counterbattery, Programmed, Defensive or Impromptu. Each type of task has its own requirements for availability and activation.
- Targets are classified as Registered, Observed, or Predicted; these classifications affect aiming point accuracy and corrections.
- Possible fire patterns are Bombardment, Fireblow, Harassing, Concentration, or Barrage. These patterns have their own availability requirements and affect beaten zone dimensions and munition effectiveness.

Combat results

"... the principal condition associated with defeat appears to have been the use of maneuver by an enemy... It does not seem to have been associated with the intensity of his firepower... Where maneuver was the decisive influence, moreover, recognition of defeat appears to have arisen from a look towards the future and an enemy's potential capabilities rather than toward the past and the casualties he has inflicted.
... The evidence indicates that in most cases, a force has quit when its casualties reached less than ten percent. In most cases, moreover, defeat has not been caused by casualties."

—McQuie R, "Battle outcomes: Casualty rates as a measure of defeat", Army, November 1987

Successful fire causes the target to be Suppressed or Neutralised. Then check for Knock-out.

When carrying out Attack or Probe orders:

- Neutralisation may cause a platoon to become pinned
- Pinning or Knock-out may cause a company to become repulsed (which in turn may require it to retreat or change to Hold orders).

Regardless of orders, overrunning may also cause retreat or surrender results.

If all of a company's troops retreat in the same move, a rout may ensue.

Repulsed, retreated or routed troops must be rallied before they can advance or be given a new order, as must troops that have attacked and occupied an objective.

== Monographs ==
- Barker P 1988, "A new WRG approach to wargaming tank combat", The Courier, vol VIII, no. 1
- Peers C 1996, "An officer classification system for WRG, 1925–2000, Wargames Illustrated, March
