= History of Wargaming Project =

The History of Wargaming Project aims to archive and publish wargaming books, rules and documents about wargaming. It has been widely referenced in the wargaming literature.

== History ==
The project was inspired by the late Paddy Griffith, a professional military historian on the staff of the Department of War Studies, Royal Military Academy Sandhurst before becoming a full-time author and freelance historian and lecturer in the early 1990s. Paddy Griffith asked why the history of wargaming was poorly documented and why there was not a library of wargaming. The aim of the project is to document and equally as important, make the key aspects of the history of wargaming readily available to the public through its publications.

== Scope ==
Covering hobby, serious and professional wargames, its scope includes:

- Reprints of wargaming books (often with unpublished material provided by the original authors, or as the result of new research)
- Military/ professional wargames- rules used by the military e.g. used by the British, American and Canadian military such as the Fred Jane Naval Wargame from 1906 and Dunn Kempf tactical wargame from the Cold War
- Landmark sets of rules e.g. Wargames Research Group 6th Edition Ancients, DBA 2.2
- Serious games used for professional training e.g. Dark Guest Training Games for cyberwarfare
- Books documenting the history of Toy Soldier. Toy soldiers have been a key part of the growth of the hobby
- New wargaming books e.g. The Fletcher Pratt Naval Wargame, or the Innovations in Wargaming series
- Some military novels by well-known wargaming authors, such as Donald Featherstone (wargamer)
- A few military history books
- As of 2020, 2 PhDs are using the archives of the project as a key part of their research.

The project has a large wargaming archive and the aim is to make this unpublished material available as rapidly as possible.
