= De Bellis Multitudinis =

Ruleset for table-top miniatures wargames

De Bellis Multitudinis (DBM) (English: Of the Wars of the Multitude) is a ruleset for table-top miniatures wargames for the period 3000 BC to 1485 AD. It is the big battle development of De Bellis Antiquitatis. As its name implies, it is aimed primarily at simulating large battles. The rules allow armies to be chosen from published Army Lists (in 4 books, with about 250 different army lists in total - but many more once all the in-list variants are taken into account) using a points system to select roughly equal armies if required.

== History ==
DBM was written by the UK based Wargames Research Group (WRG) team of Phil Barker, Richard Bodley Scott and Sue Laflin Barker. (DBMM is Phil Barker's intended successor to DBM). First published in 1993, it went through a number of formal revisions with the last published version, DBM 3.0, coming out in 2000. Two unpublished, minor revisions have since been made, with the latest, DBM 3.2, coming into use in 2011 and available through WRG's website.

DBM evolved from the earlier De Bellis Antiquitatis (DBA) rule set, adapted to play larger games with more figures, comparable in size to games played using the then popular 7th Edition WRG Ancient rules.

DBM expanded on DBA's definition troop types by function and level of training - defining troops as regular bladesmen rather than Roman legionaries for example - by adding grades for each and rating them as Regular or Irregular. Grades such as Superior, Ordinary and Inferior troops are designed to reflect relative efficiency compared to contemporary opponents, and reflect morale, equipment, mounts, and training.

== Game details ==
The armies are usually played in 15mm or 25mm scale, though 6mm and 54mm are used. Ground scale is in paces, and the number of inches to a pace varies according to the figure scale - 1" to 50 paces in 15mm, 40mm to 50 paces in 25mm. The frontage width of one stand of troops, called an element, is standardised for all troop types, the depth and number of troop models on it varies by formation type (skirmishers - or psiloi in DBM terminology - have 2 men per base, cavalry 3, heavy infantry 4 etc.)

Troop scale is not stated specifically, but as the number of troops represented by an element ranges from 128 to 256, and the number of figures used to represent them ranges from 2 to 4, an assumed scale of c 1 : 60 is not way off the mark. Elephants, Chariots, Artillery and Naval are 1 model per element, representing varying numbers of that type - for example 16 elephants or 25 chariots.

Expanding on the system introduced by DBA, DBM has twenty different types of troops, grouped into three broad categories: Mounted - Knights, Cavalry, Light Horse, Elephants, Camelry, and Expendables; Foot - Pikemen, Spearmen, Blades, Warband, Auxilia, Bowmen, Psiloi, Hordes, War Wagons, Artillery, and Baggage; Naval - Galleys, Ships, and Boats. These are then classed as either Regular or Irregular and graded as either Superior, Ordinary, Inferior, Fast, or Exceptions. Each troop type has its strengths and weaknesses, expressed by their movement rates and restrictions, their combat factors, their ability to support other friendly troop types in combat, and how they respond to victory and defeat versus other types of opposing troops.

Although the game is designed to be used between historical enemies, the level of abstraction, standardized army lists, and points system allow players to pit 5,000 years worth of opponents against each other with fairly believable outcomes in the main. The army lists are designed to produce armies of 300-500 points in size organized in 2-4 commands.

For command and control, DBM extended the Player Initiative Point (PIP) system of DBA. Each command gets a D6 dice throw of points. The player can move only the number of blocks of units that have been thrown. Allied contingents and commands led by Irregular generals must each use a different die while those of Regular generals share dice which can be assigned as needed each turn. This system came under early criticism as "superficial and surreal" and as failing to give the player the flavor of what it was like to command an ancient army. The difference between regular and irregular generals does, however, present two contrasting styles of command and control.

The level of micro management has come under criticism due to the way each individual element can be moved independently rather than being grouped into units. Moving blocks of troops is, however, more efficient than moving individual units, particularly in the early stages of the game when maneuvering towards combat. One of the most realistic aspects of DBM is the way armies become progressively more disorganized, and thus harder to control, as combat breaks larger groups into smaller groups and small groups into individual elements while the number of pips available to control them remains the same.

Combat can be either distant or close, with only a minority of troop types being able to conduct the former. Close range bow shooting and the throwing of javelins is treated as part of close combat. Opposing elements must be in full front edge to front edge contact with each other in order to engage in close combat. While simplifying combat resolution, this contact rule requires element placement on the table top to be fairly neat and precise and can result in situations where the arrangement of elements prevents some from getting into combat.

The wording of the rules has also come under criticism and their clarity unfavorably contrasted with other rules.

== Community ==
As well as friendly games, DBM competitions are played worldwide - including a truly global World championship. Competition games are typically played from 200 to 500 points, club games are typically 350 to 400 points. A 400-point army is typically an army of between about 50 and 80 elements, or about 150 - 250 figures in total (a Regular, mainly mounted army like a Mongol force is more expensive per element, whereas one based more on Irregular foot troops such as the Anglo-Saxons at Hastings is cheaper per element and thus much larger).

== De Bellis Magistrorum Militum ==
The successor to DBM is De Bellis Magistrorum Militum. DBM grew out of DBA and retained its geometric constraints. Phil Barker had grown increasingly unhappy with the way that those constraints were being used by players to block actions that would in reality have been possible. Hence he decided on a revision. While in some areas DBMM is simpler than DBM, the combat system is a good deal more complicated with a large number of modifiers. Reviewer Mark Ottley described the number of modifiers as "over the top", but then qualified this verdict by adding that, after a short while, the player can learn to ignore most of them except for rare special cases.

DBMM was first included in the British national competition Britcon in 2007.

Version 2 was written with the help of extensive online discussion in which players participated. One reviewer, who had found the first edition to be both excellent yet frustratingly difficult to play, considered the 2nd edition would do much to remove the frustration.
