= De Bellis Antiquitatis =

Miniature wargame

De Bellis Antiquitatis or DBA (English: Of the Wars of Antiquity) is a fast play set of rules for the hobby of historical miniature wargaming, particularly ancient and medieval wargaming in the period 3000 BC to 1520 AD. These rules allow entire armies to be represented by fewer than 50 figures. The rules also include diagrams and over 600 army lists. DBA is produced by the Wargames Research Group and was the first game in the DBx series, which now includes De Bellis Multitudinis (DBM), De Bellis Magistrorum Militum (DBMM, a successor or alternative to DBM), Hordes of the Things (a fantasy version), De Bellis Renationis (DBR, a Renaissance version), and Horse Foot and Guns (HFG covering 1700–1920). An online video game titled DBA Online was also created.

== Scale and basing ==
Scale: Each army is composed of 12 elements (stands), with several figures fixed upon each one. The number of men represented by an element varies according to the size of the army simulated and the number of figures that it has, but at a nominal ground it would be more or less 250 for each figure. Ground scale is 1" = 100 paces for 15 mm figures or smaller, 40 mm = 100 paces for 25/28 mm figures. One turn, called a bound in the rules, represents 15 minutes. Can be used with 25/28 mm, 15 mm, 6 mm, or 2 mm figures (54mm and larger a possible with increased base size).

Basing: The width of the base depends upon the scale of figures being used; the depth depends upon both figure scale and type. The number of figures per base also depends upon the figure's type. For instance, an element of 15 mm swordsmen is composed of 4 figures mounted on a 40 mm (frontage) x 15 mm (depth) base; a 15 mm elephant is mounted alone on a 40 mm x 40 mm base.

== History of the rules ==
DBA traces its origin back to a two-page experimental set of rules by Phil Barker dubbed De Bellis Societatis Antiquorum that was demonstrated at the Society of Ancients (after whom these experimental rules were named) conferences for 1988 and 1989. Many rulesets at that time (including Phil Barker's WRG series of ancients rules) had added greater and greater detail regarding weapons and armor, movement and orders. Many gamers perceived that this increased complexity came at a cost in playability.

The De Bellis Societatis Antiquorum ruleset was designed as a "tonic for the jaded" with the goal of providing a fun, fast and challenging game and as an alternative to the WRG series of ancients rules. The first commercial edition of DBA was published in 1990, with Phil and Sue Barker and Richard Bodley Scott as its authors. The game has continued to evolve over the years; the most recent version was published in November, 2014 with just Phil Barker and Sue Laflin Barker as authors.

- DBA 1.0, 1990
- DBA 1.1, March 1995
- DBA 1.2, 1998 (Issued as a set of amendments)
- DBA 1.22, 1999 (Issued as a set of amendments)
- DBA 2.0, February 2001
- DBA 2.1, 2003 (Issued as a set of amendments)
- DBA 2.2, January 2004
- There have been many variants of the game, one is DBA 2.2+, 2012 (Issued by WADBAG, unofficial)
- DBA 3.0, November 2014

== Online version ==
An online version known as DBAOL (DBA On-Line) was published by Wargaming.net in 2000, based upon DBA v1.2 and upgraded to 1.22. However the online version of the game was not upgraded to match newer versions of DBA, and the website announced that it is closing down from 1 December 2019.

Versions of DBA are available on Vassal and Tabletop simulator.

== Gameplay ==
Players use a single six-sided die each, and games are played on a square field, which conventionally (though not necessarily) has sides that are roughly sixteen times the base width being used.

Though the exact details differ in different editions of the game, in the current version players roll dice to determine who will be the invader and who will be the defender. The defender uses a random process to place terrain according to his army's home territory, and the invader chooses which side his army will enter the board. The players then alternate in placing their camp model and armies, and the defender takes the first bound.

Players then alternate bounds. At the start of each bound, the active player dices for "PIPs". PIPs are the spots on a die. The number of PIPs rolled represents the player's level of control for the turn. Players spend their PIPs to move single elements or connected groups of elements on the game board. PIPs do not carry over from turn to turn. PIPs simulate (though not model) the difficulties of command and control during a battle, and players find that once battle is joined, they often need to spend all of their available PIPs shoring up their battle line, with few PIPs left over for maneuver of un-engaged elements.

After making any such desired moves, the players then conduct combat, both ranged and close combat, adjudicated in the order specified by the active player.

Combat is resolved per-element, in the order desired by the active player. To resolve combat, each player throws one die and adds modifiers for both troop type and battlefield situation (such as being outflanked or up hill). The higher roll wins the combat and results are applied immediately, before the next combat is decided. Achieving a roll twice as high as your opponent generally destroys that opponent, with lesser successes merely pushing the opponent back out of the line of battle. Note that since results are applied immediately, shrewd players resolve combats whose results can give them advantages against other elements in future combats.

Once all combats have been resolved, the other player takes their turn. The game continues in this way until one of the players achieves the win condition - the destruction of 1/3 of the enemy's army. In the event of a tie at the end of bound, play continues until the end of a bound where one player has lost more than the opponent.

== Criticisms ==
Some players have found Phil Barker's succinct rule writing style to be difficult to decipher, referring to it as "Barkerese". The current version involved many players giving the author advice to improve the format and readability.

Due to the nature of DBA's combat system, DBA is often criticized as being over-"geometric", as elements are matched up in precise ways, and base widths must match up with some precision. Many of the improvements in the various editions of DBA have been to address geometric concerns and "millimetrics".

== Legacy ==
Over the years, several historical and fantasy wargame systems stemmed from the original DBA rules and its fantasy derivative, Hordes of the Things. These systems tend to retain similar basing standards compared with DBA, but strive for an overall clearer presentation of the rules (in clear contrast to the "Barkerese"). Furthermore, each system had existing rules and units changed to achieve different gameplay and simulation goals. These systems also offer a more streamlined player support, with rules errata, Facebook groups and forums. Most systems abandoned the traditional 12-elements army model, and created a point-based system to allow for more balanced confrontations between armies.

As of November 2024, examples include (but are not limited to):

- Age of Hannibal
- Armati
- Art de la Guerre
- Basic Impetus and Impetus
- Clash of Spears
- Fantastic Battles
- Lion Rampant and Dragon Rampant
- Mortem et Gloriam
- Polemos
- The Portable Wargame
- Strength and Honour
- Sword and Spear
- Swordpoint
- To the Strongest!
- Triumph! and Fantasy Triumph!
