= Hordes of the Things (wargame) =

Tabletop game

Hordes of the Things (HOTT) is a fantasy miniature wargame, published by Wargames Research Group. The game was first published in 1991, with a revised second edition from 2002. A generic fantasy game, it can represent armies from a wide variety of settings. Some gamers even use HOTT to simulate other time periods, since, for example, a "Shooter" can just as easily be a company of musketeers as it can a company of archers.

HOTT rules are based on the rules of De Bellis Antiquitatis, with the addition of a magic phase and new troop types, and the retention or simplification of other troop types.

== Description ==
'Hordes of the Things' is a set of fast play miniatures rules for fantasy battles. It is designed to be generic and is not, therefore, tied to any particular fantasy genre, set of books, range of figures or even scale. This is achieved by the game concentrating on the effect of an action rather than precisely how it is achieved. The primary example of this is in the use of Magicians. There are no spell lists in HOTT, Magicians act as a kind of powerful long range artillery and inflict combat outcomes on the opposition. The effect of their attack may be that a bolt of lightning has been cast, the enemy troops have experienced fearful visions or that they have been infected with a plague of lice. This is unimportant in terms of the game. What is important is that they will either stand and take it (attack has no effect), they will fall back in disarray, or they will be destroyed or quit the field.

An army is made up of a number of 'elements' of equal frontage and varying numbers of figures. The number of figures on each element is unimportant and need only be what looks right for any given army; all game mechanisms use the element as a basic unit. The number of elements in an army is based on a points system. Each element costs 1, 2, 3, 4 or 6 Army Points (AP) depending on its type. A basic army is made up of 24 AP worth of troops, but no more than half the points can be spent on elements costing 3 or more AP. A basic army is therefore normally made up of between 9 and 12 elements, although 13-24 element armies are possible. Elements are of basic types—examples are Knights (mounted troops relying on a fierce charge), Blades (skilled fencing infantry), Heroes (superhuman individuals), Lurkers (things that hide and ambush) and Magicians (practitioners of magic). One element is the army's general.

Turns are alternate. In their turn a player dices for Player Initiative Points (PIPs), spell casting and shooting is resolved and finally close combat is resolved. A player's PIPs are used to move elements, cast spells and perform certain other actions. Shooting, spell casting and close combat is resolved using the same mechanisms; shooting and spell casting are resolved between any elements in range, close combat between adjacent elements. Combat results generally cause elements to recoil, flee or be destroyed outright. An army loses if its general is lost, half its points are lost or, if the defender, its stronghold is lost. A game generally lasts less than an hour.

== Units ==
A HOTT army is made up of 24 "points" worth of troop stands, drawn from the following list. Note that each type of troops has a different cost in points.

- Aerial Heroes—Heroes who can fly, or have a flying mount
- Airboats—Large flying platforms, like zeppelins
- Artillery—Powerful, long ranged missile weapons
- Beasts—Savage creatures, like wolves
- Behemoths—Elephants, Giants, Dinosaurs, etc.
- Blades—Well equipped foot soldiers, like the Roman legion
- Clerics—Religious leaders who perform an anti-Magician role
- Dragons—Large, super-intelligent flying creatures
- Fliers—Giant Eagles or other dangerous flying creatures
- Gods—Powerful supernatural entities, like Zeus
- Heroes—Mighty warriors of renown
- Hordes—Endless seas of poorly trained and equipped fighters
- Knights—Armored horsemen who charge ferociously into mêlée
- Lurkers—Creatures that hide in dark places; water lurkers are a specialised version that live in aquatic terrain
- Magicians—Spell casters, sorcerers and conjurers
- Paladins—Warriors of Great Virtue
- Riders—Mounted soldiers who fight with missile weapons in preference to mêlée
- Shooters—Soldiers who fight with missile weapons, such as archers and crossbow men
- Sneakers—Ninjas and other sneaky assassin types
- Spears—Well ordered soldiers fighting in phalanx
- Warband—Ferocious soldiers who lack discipline but not bravery
