= Charles Grant (game designer) =

Scottish game author

- Born: 1915; Lauder, Scotland
- Died: May 1979 (aged 63–64)
- Occupations: Game designer, author
- Known for: The War Game (1971)

Charles Grant (1915 — May 1979) was a Scottish game author who helped popularize the hobby of tabletop wargaming. He is best known as the author of The War Game.

Grant was born in Lauder, Scotland in 1915. He served in the Royal Air Force in World War II and later in Scotland Yard's Special Branch. He was a contributor to Military Modelling and Battle and occasionally an editor of Slingshot the Journal of the Society of Ancients.

Grant has had influence among the war-game designers. Jeff Jonas of Warhammer Ancient Battles describes his writings as inspirational. War-game designer Rick Priestley has said reading Grant's Battle: Practical Wargaming got him into the career.

== Personal life ==
Grant died in May 1979. He is survived by his son Charles S. Grant, who is also a published wargamer, and his daughter Nina. They lived in Kent, England. His son wrote his obituary in the July 1979 Military Modelling edition.

== Books ==
- Ancient Battles for Wargamers, Charles Grant, Model and Allied Publications, 1977. ISBN 0-85242-553-8
- Battle of Fontenoy (Background books for wargamers and modellers) 1975
- Battle: Practical Wargaming, Charles Grant, Model and Allied Publications, 1970.
- Napoleonic Wargaming, Charles Grant, Model and Allied Publications, 1974. (To be re-published by Caliver Books, Summer 2008)
- The Ancient War Game, Charles Grant, A. & C. Black, 1974, ISBN 0-7136-1448-X.
- The War Game, Charles Grant, A. & C. Black, 1971, (Back in print as in May 2008)
- Wargame Tactics, Charles Grant, Cassell, 1979. ISBN 0-304-30470-0
