= Donald Featherstone (wargamer) =

British physiotherapist, military historian, author & wargamer

Donald F. Featherstone (20 March 1918 – 3 September 2013) was a British author of more than forty books on wargaming and military history.

== Life ==
Donald Featherstone was born on 20 March 1918 in London. and during the Second World War, he joined the Royal Armoured Corps. An account of his war experiences with the 51st (Leeds Rifles) Royal Tank Regiment can be found in his book Lost Tales.

Professionally, he was a physiotherapist living in Southampton, who worked for both Southampton Football Club and Hampshire County Cricket Club. Featherstone was first introduced to wargaming by reading H. G. Wells' Little Wars and his first opponent was his brother. His second opponent was Tony Bath many years later in 1955. His wife saw a description of a solo wargame being played in Southampton by Tony Bath and Featherstone then got in touch.

Tackle Model Soldiers This Way 1963

In 1960, the two of them began editing the UK version of the War Game Digest, a seminal wargaming newsletter started by Jack Scruby in the United States. Featherstone expressed disapproval of a trend towards articles "attempting to spread an aura of pseudo-science over what is a pastime". In 1962, he started his own periodical, Wargamer's Newsletter. He produced this each month without a gap, with 214 editions until January 1980.

In 1961, he organised the first UK wargames convention at his home in Southampton. Two years later, he organized the first National Wargames Championships Convention at a local hotel, which was attended by about a hundred wargamers from all over the country.

In 1977, he was one of the founder members of the British Commission for Military History. In 1978, Featherstone appeared on the BBC to promote the hobby.

After a discussion with Paddy Griffith, Featherstone realised that wargaming as a hobby could aid considerably in understanding military history.

== Death ==
Donald Featherstone died on 3 September 2013, aged 95, from complications following a fall at home.

== Bibliography ==
- War Games (1962), A revised edition has been printed as part of the History of Wargaming Project (see here), ISBN 1291851429
- Tackle Model Soldiers This Way, Stanley Paul, London, (1963), "Accident history for B0000CLY2B". Aviation Safety Network.
- Naval War Games, Stanley Paul, London, (1965), ISBN 0-09-076581-8, Updated edition 2009
- Air War Games, (1966), ISBN 9798813009402
- Bowmen of England, (1967), ISBN 0850529468
- At Them with the Bayonet! The First Sikh War New English Library, (1968), ISBN 9780450016752
- Advanced War Games, Stanley Paul, London, (1965), ISBN 0-09-087350-5, reprinted 2008
- War Game Campaigns, Stanley Paul (1963), Sport Shelf reprinted (1970) ISBN 9780392002769
- War Game Campaigns, History of Wargaming Project, Sport Shelf; First Edition (1 Jan. 1970), ISBN 978-0091024901
- Handbook For Model Soldier Collectors, (1969), ISBN 0392000040
- Battles with Model Soldiers, (1970), ISBN 0715349252
- Military Modelling, (1970), ISBN 0498078329
- MacDonald of the 42nd, Seeley, (1971), ISBN 0450020991
- Conflict In Hampshire, Publisher: HAMPSHIRE THE COUNTY MAGAZINE, (1 Jan. 1972)
- Poitiers 1356: Knight's Battles for Wargamers, Hippocrene Books, (1 Jun. 1972), ISBN 0882542125
- War Games through the Ages: Vol. 1 3000BC-1500AD, Stanley Paul, (1972), ISBN 0-09-110240-5
- All for a Shilling a Day, New English Library, (1973), ISBN 978-1846771965. Reprinted 2007
- Solo Wargaming, Kaye & Ward, London, (1973), ISBN 0 7182 0921 4. Reprinted 2009
- Tank battles in miniature: A wargamers' guide to the Western Desert Campaign in 1940-1942, P. Stephens, (1973), ISBN 9780850592757
- Battle Notes for Wargamers, David & Charles, 1973; ISBN 0-7153-6310-7 Revised 2011
- Captain Carey's Blunder (1973) ISBN 0850520606
- War Games through the Ages: Vol. 2 1420-1783, Stanley Paul, 1974; ISBN 0-09-118760-5
- War Games through the Ages: Vol. 3 1792-1879, Stanley Paul, 1975; ISBN 0-09-121250-2
- Skirmish Wargaming, Patrick Stephens Limited, (1975), ISBN 0-85059-197-X; new edition 2009
- Wargaming: Ancient and Medieval Periods. David & Charles, UK, (1975), ISBN 0-7153-6939-3. Hippocrene Books, USA, (1975), ISBN 0-88254-353-9.
- War Games through the Ages: Vol. 4 1861-1945 Stanley Paul, (1976) ISBN 0091265207
- Wargaming Airborne Operations, Kaye & Ward, (1975), ISBN 0-7182-1172-3, reprinted 2009
- Wargaming Pike and Shot, (1977), Revised 2010
- Better Military Modelling Kaye & Ward,(1977), ISBN 9780718214470
- Tank battles in miniature: A wargamers' guide to Mediterranean Campaigns 1943-1945, Patrick Stephens Limited, (1977), ISBN 0-85059-275-5
- Weapons and Equipment of the Victorian Soldier Littlehampton Book Svs Ltd, (1978), ISBN 978-0713708479
- Battles With Model Tanks TBS The Book Service Ltd, (19 April 1979), ISBN 978-0354012287
- Featherstone's Complete Wargaming, David & Charles, (1989); ISBN 0-7153-9262-X
- Victoria's Enemies: An A-Z of British Colonial Warfare Blandford, (1989), ISBN 978-0713720815
- The Peninsular War, Argus Books, (1991), ISBN 1 85486 028 3
- Victorian Colonial Warfare: Africa, from the Campaigns Against the Kaffirs to the South African War, (1992), ISBN 0-304-341746
- Victorian Colonial Warfare: India: From the Conquest of Sind to the Indian Mutiny, (1992), ISBN 0-304-34172-X
- Khartoum 1885: General Gordon's last stand, Osprey, (1993), ISBN 978-1855323018
- Tel El-Kebir 1882 : Wolseley's Conquest of Egypt Osprey, (1993), ISBN 978-1855323018
- The History of the English Longbow, Dorset Press, (1995), ISBN 978-1566196772
- Omdurman 1898 : Kitchener's victory in the Sudan, Osprey, (1994), ISBN 978-1855323681
- Redcoats for the Raj, Valda Publishing, UK, (1996), ISBN 0-9526861-0-4
- Warriors and Warfare in Ancient and Medieval Times (1997), ISBN 978-0094768505
- Khaki & Red: Soldiers of the Queen in India and Africa Arms & Armour Press, (1997), ISBN 978-1854094254
- Bowmen of England Pen & Sword Books,(2003), ISBN 978-0850529463
- The Battlefield Walker's Handbook Airlife Publishing Ltd, (2005), ISBN 978-1853108815
- Donald Featherstone's Lost Tales, (2009), ISBN 978-1-4092-9431-3
- Donald Featherstone's The Badgered Men: A novel describing the life of the Victorian cavalry man at the time of the First Sikh War 1845-1846 (2011) ISBN 978-1470944018
- Donald Featherstone's Wargaming Commando Operations: (2013) ISBN 978-1291398915
