= Warhammer Ancient Battles =

Miniature wargame

The Cover of the Warhammer Ancient Battles rulebook.

Warhammer Ancient Battles (often referred to as "WAB" and sometimes Warhammer Historical) is a ruleset for miniatures wargames produced by Games Workshop's Warhammer Historical Wargames imprint. It is a rulebook for historical wargames developed from the popular Warhammer Fantasy Battle by Jervis Johnson, Rick Priestley and the Perry brothers. On 24 May 2012, Warhammer Historical closed their website and are now defunct.

== Playing the game ==
Games of Warhammer Ancient Battles model hypothetical battles between historical armies. Battles are fought between armies of miniatures. The game is played on a table laid out with model scenery to look like a battlefield, on which the units of miniatures are manoeuvred. Large numbers of dice are needed to resolve combat and shooting.

== Development ==
Several of Games Workshop's staff had begun experimenting with using Warhammer rules to play historical games before Warhammer Ancient Battles was written, and Wargames Illustrated magazine included some articles that had been written on the subject. This led to the development of Warhammer Ancient Battles as a spare-time project. It was published under the name "Warhammer Historical Wargames." Based as it was on Warhammer Fantasy, Warhammer Ancient Battles served as a bridge for fantasy wargamers to discover historical wargaming but also attracted wargamers who had never played the fantasy version. Games Workshop eventually brought the project back in-house, with Rob Broom running the Warhammer Historical Wargames department that promoted an increasing number of books.

To accusations that the rules were only a throwback to an earlier era of wargaming, Jervis Johnson pleaded guilty. He said the rules were intended to be fun and informal, rather than dominated by requirements of super-detailed historical accuracy. And the designers had rejected the approach of contemporary rule sets as being too abstract.

The game rules were heavily based on the fifth edition of Warhammer, with magic dropped and more detail added for ancient weapons and formations. The two games subsequently developed in different directions. Modifications to the core rules have been included in some of the more recent supplements. The WAB 2nd edition consciously took the rules even further from its fantasy origins.

Following the success of Warhammer Ancient Battles, Warhammer Historical branched out into other areas:

- Gladiator
- Kampfgruppe Normandy
- Legends of the High Seas
- Legends of the Old West
- Richthofen's Flying Circus
- The Great War
- Trafalgar
- Warhammer English Civil War
- Warmaster Ancients - the application of the epic scale rules for Warhammer Fantasy to non-fantasy armies.
- Waterloo

== Rules ==
The rules are written for individually-based figures and this approach was in marked contrast to the element-based rulesets current among ancient historical wargames when the rules were first published. Standard bearers, musicians and officer figures are given specific advantages - seen by some as giving the rules more character.

=== Second edition ===
A second edition ruleset was released in April 2010, written by Martin Gibbins. The revision aimed to encourage linear battle formations and to make flank attacks easier. The first edition had had some elements that derived from its origin as a fantasy set and the revision aimed to remove them. Hence, the influence of characters was reduced.

== Supplements ==
The core rulebook includes army lists for "Early Imperial Roman" and "Barbarian" armies. A range of supplementary books has been released to provide more army lists, each focusing on a particular period and place.

- Armies of Antiquity. Released soon after the rulebook, this was intended to help players get started, by providing a large number of basic summary army lists. Many of the lists have been superseded by later supplements.
- Chariot Wars. Covers armies of the ancient civilisations in the Bronze Age Near East, and the Trojan War.
- Fall of the West. Covers Roman and Barbarian armies of the 4th-5th centuries.
- Shieldwall. Covers the British Isles, France and Scandinavia in the Dark Ages.
- El Cid. Covers the Spanish Reconquista in the 10th-13th centuries.
- Alexander the Great. The armies of Alexander the Great and his enemies.
- Armies of Chivalry. Designed to extend Warhammer Ancient Battles to a slightly later medieval period, this includes new rules as well as a set of summary army lists covering Europe in the 14th-16th centuries.
- Spartacus. Based around a campaign following Spartacus' slave revolt.
- Byzantium : Beyond the Golden Gate. Covers the Byzantine Empire from 6th-12th centuries.
- Hannibal and the Punic Wars. Covers the Punic Wars between Rome and Carthage in the 3rd-2nd centuries BC.
- Vlad the Impaler. Covers the general time and region of the Ottoman Turks.
- The Art of War. Details the armies of Chinese history and prehistory, as well as those of its neighbours at the time (such as the Hsiung-nu), up until the Three Kingdoms era.
- Age of Arthur. Features armies from Sub-Roman Britain.
- Siege and Conquest. This features rules for raids, sieges and settlements. It does not include any army lists though it does include things that can be added to the armies derived from the lists in the other books. The reviewer in Wargames Illustrated considered a key feature of this supplement in that it facilitates battles that take more varied forms than a simple head to head battle.

== Community ==
The game was supported by a high-traffic discussion group on Yahoo! Groups, the WABlist, and Warhammer Historical Forums (the former a non-Yahoo message board). In addition. another group WABMedievalBattles, focused on the medieval period.

== Reception ==
In Issue 19 of The Ancible, Robey Jenkins compared Warhammer Ancient Battles to Warhammer Fantasy Battle and noted that the game "cannot provide an epic spectacle to compare with the large-scale fantasy battle games (war elephants cannot, ultimately, compete with dragons and giant spiders), but it can still speak to a player's armchair general with more clarity and reality than the finest fantasy game precisely because those bells and whistles no longer exist to act as a crutch."
