= Echelons of Fury =

1995 card game by Medallion Simulations

- Card back to Echelons of Fury CCG
- Publishers: Medallion Simulations
- Players: 2 or more
- Setup time: < 5 minutes
- Playing time: < 60 minutes

Echelons of Fury is an out-of-print collectible card game by Medallion Simulations.

== Publication history ==
It was released in May 1995 alongside Echelons of Fire. The First Edition set had at least 70 cards though some sources claim 57 cards. It had two other expansions, one released in October 1995, called Second Edition and it contained at least 95 cards; the second expansion was called Pacific Campaign and it contained at least 105 cards. The Second Edition was believed to have unannounced cards in the set as well and one card suspected as missing called U.S. M-26 Pershing. Both the First and Second editions had incomplete card lists supplied by the manufacturer. A future expansion called Echelons Freedom Fighters was scheduled for 2002 but never materialized. Other expansions were announced including a Russian front, as well as a modern-day war against North Korea, but they too were never released.

== Gameplay ==
The game was based on the World War II between the Americans and the Germans. The game was considered "hard to pick up" due to the "dense rulebook" and its rules were compared to miniature wargaming. The Pacific Campaign expansion adapted the war versus Japan with cards geared toward island war. The Allied player had to land their craft onto shore, while the Japanese player had to respond with counters via bombers and booby traps.

== Reception ==
Allen Varney reviewed the game as a "worse clone" of Magic: the Gathering.
