= Skirmisher Publishing =

Skirmisher Publishing LLC is a publisher of wargames, roleplaying games and historic reprints based in Spring Branch, Texas, USA. It was founded by the author, editor and game designer Michael J. Varhola and is co-owned by Robert "Mac" McLaughlin, Oliver Cass and Geoffrey Weber. The Skirmisher Game Development Group is creates, playtests and evaluates games for Skirmisher Publishing LLC.

== Products ==
About half of Skirmisher's products have been published under the d20 System, a system of game mechanics for role-playing games published in 2000 by Wizards of the Coast, that is based on the third edition of Dungeons & Dragons and named after the 20-sided die which is central to the core mechanics of the system.

Skirmisher products created for the d20 system include the books Experts (2002), Warriors (2003), Tests of Skill (2004), Nuisances (2005) and Experts v.3.5 (2005). Artists whose work appears in these books include Brendan Cass, Dragan Ciric, Sharon L. Daugherty, William Hazzard II, Phil "Shade" Kightlinger, and Lissanne Lake (noted for her numerous Dragon magazine covers), and Geoffrey Weber.

Other notable Skirmisher publications include a reprint of the H.G. Wells 1913 wargaming classic Little Wars (2004) — which the company republished in a self-standing form for the first time in 27 years, a reprint of Wells' 1911 work Floor Games (2006), which includes a foreword by the game designer James F. Dunnigan, and the third edition of the Cthulhu Live live-action roleplaying game.

The company also has a line of Orc miniatures that it has dubbed the "Orcs of the Triple Death" and which it supports with a series of products that include d20 game statistics and descriptive text.

== History ==
Skirmisher Publishing LLC was founded by the author, editor and game designer Michael J. Varhola and is co-owned by Robert "Mac" McLaughlin, Oliver Cass and Geoffrey Weber. It was incorporated in early 2005, but before then had simply been "doing business as" Skirmisher Publishing since mid-2001. According to information posted on the company website, however, its origins are much older, and date immediately to a miniature wargaming development group founded by Varhola and Weber in the mid-1990s and ultimately to the gaming circle based in Munich, Germany, in the early 1980s that included Varhola, McLaughlin and friends Paul Knorr and George Sieretski. The latter helped to develop the "skirmish wargaming" rules from which the company derived its name.

When Skirmisher published its first d20 book, Experts, in 2002, publisher Varhola decided to dedicate it to the Dungeons & Dragons creator Gary Gygax and to ask him to write a foreword to the book, believing that such an implicit endorsement would be an auspicious sign for his fledgling venture.

"No reader should be surprised at finding this prefatory piece herein," wrote Gygax in the first paragraph of this foreword. "As the principle one to whom this book is dedicated, there was no conceivable way I could refuse writing a short introduction for it without seeming to be a total ingrate. I mention this merely to point out the clever tactics of the authors, for the same ingenuity is certainly applied to the contents of the work proper." Skirmisher retained the same dedication and foreword in the revised, expanded and redesigned Experts v.3.5, which it released in 2005.

In 2004, Skirmisher became the first gaming company to publish in its books maps created using digital images of three-dimensional models. Publications using this technique include Tests of Skill and Experts v.3.5, examples of which are available as free downloads on the company website.

After the rights to Call of Cthulhu was transferred from Fantasy Flight Games to Skirmisher Publishing, Skirmisher published a third edition in 2006. Fantasy Flight Games and Skirmisher Publishing also kept the Cthulhu Live live-action role-playing game going.

== The Skirmisher Game Development Group ==
The Skirmisher Game Development Group is composed of several writers, artists and filmmakers and one current and several former military intelligence officers. Its functions include creating, playtesting and evaluating games of all sorts for Skirmisher Publishing LLC, particularly role-playing games and tactical-level miniature wargames, exploring the principles of game theory and applying those principles and the concept of role-playing to problem solving.
