= Echelons of Fire =

Collectible card game

- Cardback to Echelons of Fire CCG
- Publishers: Medallion Simulations
- Players: 2 or more
- Setup time: < 5 minutes
- Playing time: < 60 minutes

Echelons of Fire is an out-of-print collectible card game by Medallion Simulations.

== Publication history ==
Echelons of Fire was derived from the Tactical Command miniatures game. It was released in May 1995 alongside Echelons of Fury. The First Edition set had at least 70 cards though some sources claim 69 cards. It had one other expansion, released in October 1995, called Second Edition and it contained at least 95 cards. The Second Edition introduced British and Serbian forces. Both the First and Second editions had incomplete card lists supplied by the manufacturer.

== Gameplay ==
The game was based on the Cold War between the U.S. and the U.S.S.R. The game was considered "hellishly complex" and its rules were compared to miniature wargaming.

Players used aircraft, anti-aircraft guns, amphibious vehicles, tanks, mine-fields, engineers, and about a dozen other special cards and abilities. Players first have to build a battlefield: Each starter comes with five Terrain cards, each with a modifier regarding specific types of Combatants. (Tanks don't do well in towns, but soldiers do.) Each turn, players draw a card, play a Supply card (either ammo or fuel), and brings troops, vehicles and Support cards (guns, gear) into play face down. Supply points limit the amount of equipment you can have in play. When you're feeling tough, you can flip some guys over and send them marching through a specific Terrain using a Maneuver card. The game was compared to Magic: the Gathering in terms of gameplay, but, with all of the other special cards and abilities.

== Reception ==
Allen Varney reviewed the game as a "worse clone" of Magic: the Gathering.
