= Cthulhu Live =

Live-action horror roleplaying game

Cthulhu Live is a live-action roleplaying game (LARP) version of the popular horror roleplaying game Call of Cthulhu, based on the works of horror author H. P. Lovecraft.

== Publication history ==
Created by game designer Robert "Mac" McLaughlin, the first edition of the game was published in 1997 by Chaosium as a 154-page softcover book, with cover art by Bob Berta.

A second edition and four supplements were published over the following years by Fantasy Flight Games.

In 2006, a third edition was published by Skirmisher Publishing LLC.

== Setting ==
Like Call of Cthulhu, this game is set in the 1920s. Players take on the role of ordinary folk (lawyers, private eyes, etc.) who are drawn into investigating the rise of occult horrors in their neighbourhood.

== Gameplay ==
Rules have been deliberately streamlined to accommodate the live-action aspect. Character have only four attributes: Dexterity, Education, Constitution, and Power, as well as a number of Sanity Points that represent mental stability. The player can then buy a number of skills from a list.

When a character wants to try a task, the referee assigns the task a difficulty, and then compares the difficulty to the character's relevant skill. If the skill equals or exceeds the difficulty of the task, then the character succeeds.

== Reception ==
Andrew Rilstone reviewed Cthulhu Live for Arcane magazine, rating it a 9 out of 10 overall, and stated that "This is a game which only the most ambitious playing group is going to be able to run – but the information and advice it contains could hardly be improved on. My overall score reflects this."

In the November 1997 edition of Dragon (Issue 241), Rick Swan "adored" the game, although he admitted it had a few problems. Swan believed the live-action game needed 10-15 participants, far more than a normal role-playing game. And he found the combat system "awkward". Nonetheless he gave the game a thumbs up, saying, "You'll find Cthulhu Live to be a great way to spend a weekend, a theatrical extravaganza that captures the flavor of the RPG and doesn’t take itself too seriously."

== Reviews ==
- Shadis #34 (1996)
- Backstab (Issue 3 - May/Jun 1997)
- Casus Belli #106
- Pyramid (Issue 26 - Jul 1997)
