= Bolt Action (wargame) =

Tabletop wargame

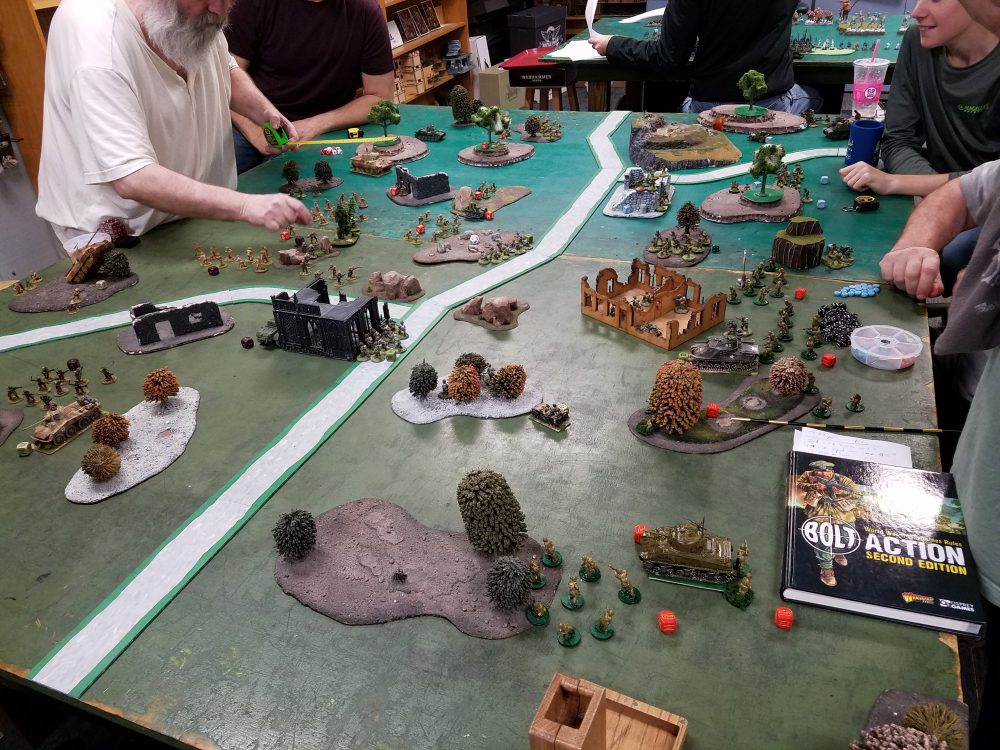
- A game of Bolt Action.
- Manufacturers: Warlord Games
- Designers: Alessio Cavatore and Rick Priestley
- Publishers: Osprey Publishing
- Years active: 2012–present
- Genres: Miniature wargame
- Players: 2+
- Website: boltaction.com

Bolt Action is a miniature wargame produced by Warlord Games. It is set during World War II and uses 28mm-sized models. The game was developed by Alessio Cavatore and Rick Priestley. The first edition of the rulebook was published in 2012, and the second edition was published in 2016. The most recent edition of the game is the third edition published in 2024. Supplements for the game include The Korean War, an alternate history setting Operation Sea Lion and Konflikt '47, set in a Dieselpunk and supernatural alternate history of World War II.

The game has multiple playable armies such as the Soviet Union, British Empire, United States, German Third Reich, and Empire of Japan. The game also has a few smaller or supporting armies such as France, British Commonwealth, Greece, Australia, Belgium, Finland, Poland, Bulgaria, Kingdom of Romania, China and Kingdom of Italy as well as rules for major battles such as The Battle of Stalingrad, Pegasus Bridge, Battle of Berlin and D-Day. Some starter Boxes can symbolize the Campaigns done in World War 2 like the American Island Hopping Campaign against the Empire of Japan in the Island Assault box and African Campaign with the British Empire and German Third Reich in the A Gentleman's War box.

== Gameplay ==
A Game of Bolt Action is usually played on a table with a playing area of 6ft by 4ft. Players will need six sided dice, a tape measure, and the unique Bolt Action "order dice". Bolt Action is played over a series of turns, with a typical game lasting six or seven turns. Unlike games such as Warhammer 40,000, where one player will play their full turn and then the second player will play theirs, Bolt Action uses a system of alternating activations. Players place their order dice into a container or bag and draw, at random, to see which player will activate a unit next.

When a unit is activated it can perform one of six actions, these are;

- Advance - Allows a unit to be moved, and then shoot with reduced accuracy
- Ambush - Allows a unit to skip its activation, in order to be activated later during an opponent's move
- Down - A unit forgoes the ability to move or shoot, but is more resilient to incoming attacks
- Fire - Allows a unit to shoot, though it cannot move
- Rally - A unit forgoes any other action to attempt to remove pin markers
- Run - A unit forgoes the ability to shoot in order to move faster

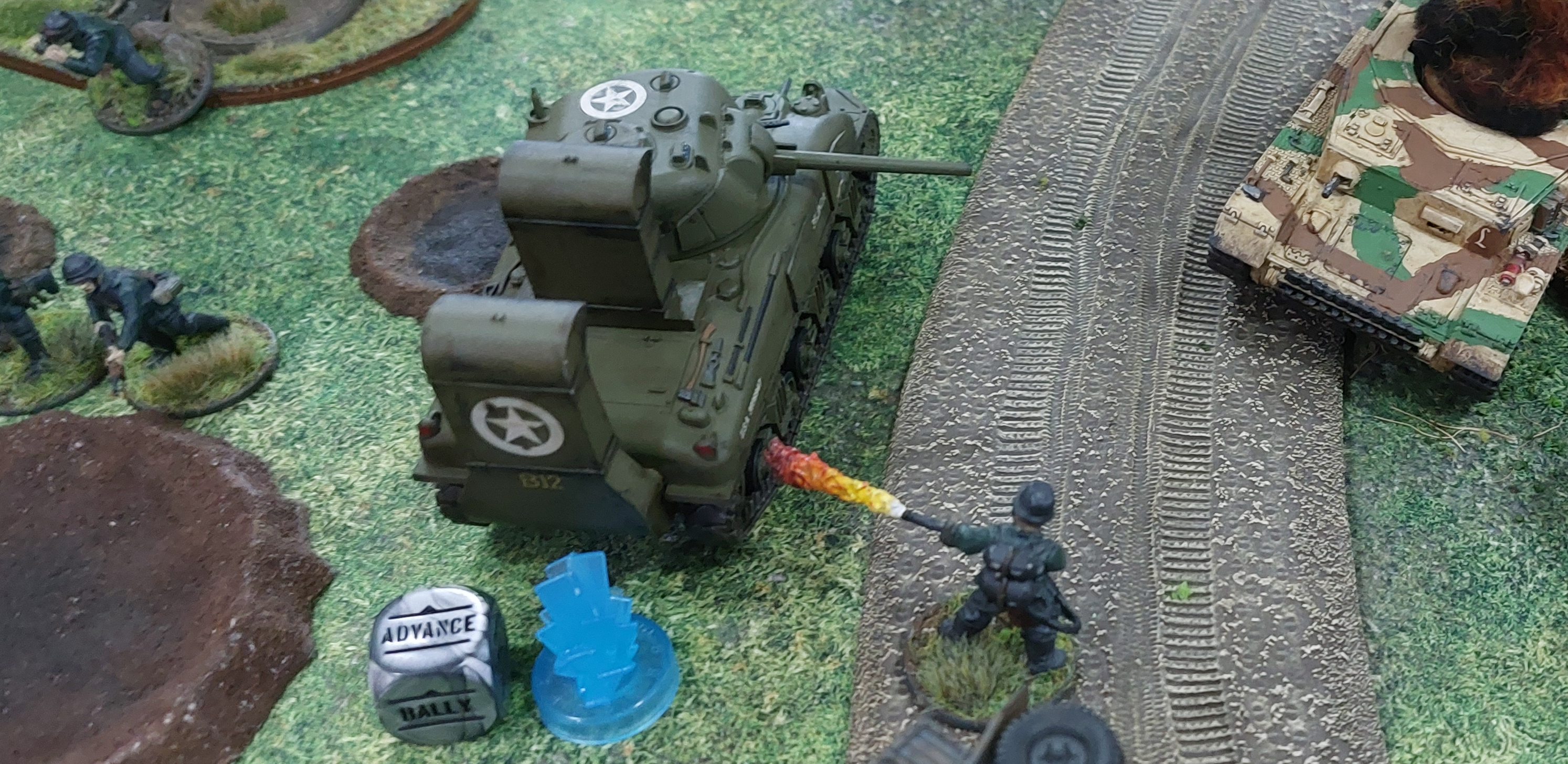
A game of Bolt Action, showing pin markers and order dice, unique to the system.

Once all order dice have been removed from the container or bag, and all used, the turn ends. At the beginning of the next turn surviving units have their order dice placed back into the container or bag, and the sequence begins again.

Another core mechanic of the game is its use of "pin markers". As a unit takes damage during a game it can accumulate pin markers. If a unit gets too many pin markers it may disobey orders, or leave the field of play.

Originally the game featured an infantry platoon per side with some supporting elements. The release of the third edition of the game expanded the scope to include several platoons per side and thus allowed for the inclusion of more vehicles.

== Rules and sourcebooks ==
The following core rules were published for Bolt Action:

- 2012 Bolt Action
- 2016 Bolt Action Rulebook Second Edition
- 2016 Konflikt ’47: Weird World War II Wargames Rules
- 2024 Bolt Action Rulebook Third Edition

The rules of the second edition were also translated into Spanish, French, Italian, and German.

In addition, several expansions were published:

The following expansions were published for Bolt Action:

- 2014 – Bolt Action: Battleground Europe D-Day to Germany
- 2015 – Bolt Action: Ostfront – Barbarossa to Berlin
- 2015 – Bolt Action: Germany Strikes! – Early War in Europe
- 2015 – Bolt Action: Empire in Flames – The Pacific and Far East
- 2016 – Bolt Action: Duel in the sun – The African and Italian Campaigns
- 2019 – Bolt Action Second Edition: Korea

The following army-expansions were published for Bolt Action:

- 2012 – Bolt Action: Armies of Germany
- 2013 – Bolt Action: Armies of the United States
- 2013 – Bolt Action: Armies of the Soviet Union
- 2013 – Bolt Action: Armies of Great Britain
- 2013 – Bolt Action: Armies of France and the Allies
- 2013 – Bolt Action: Armies of Imperial Japan
- 2013 – Bolt Action: Armies of Italy and the Axis
- 2014 – Bolt Action: Tank War
- 2016 – Bolt Action Second Edition: Armies of Germany
- 2025 - Bolt Action: Armies of Germany: Third Edition
- 2025 - Bolt Action: Armies of the United States: Third Edition
- 2025 - Bolt Action: Armies of Great Britain: Third Edition
- 2025 - Bolt Action: Armies of the Soviet Union: Third Edition
- 2026 - Bolt Action: Armies of Imperial Japan: Third Edition
- 2026 - Bolt Action: Armies of Italy: Third Edition

The following campaign expansions were published for Bolt Action:

- 2017 – Bolt Action Second Edition: Campaign Battle of the Bulge
- 2017 – Bolt Action Second Edition: Campaign New Guinea
- 2017 – Bolt Action Second Edition: Campaign The Road to Berlin
- 2018 – Bolt Action Second Edition: Campaign Market Garden
- 2018 – Bolt Action Second Edition: Campaign Battle of France
- 2019 – Bolt Action Second Edition: Campaign D-Day: Overlord
- 2021 – Bolt Action Second Edition: Campaign D-Day: US Sector
- 2021 – Bolt Action Second Edition: Campaign D-Day: British & Canadian Sectors
- 2020 – Bolt Action Second Edition: Campaign Mariana & Palau Islands
- 2021 – Bolt Action Second Edition: Campaign Italy: Soft Underbelly
- 2023 – Bolt Action Second Edition: Campaign Italy: Tough Gut
- 2018 – Bolt Action Second Edition: Campaign The Western Desert
- 2020 – Bolt Action Second Edition: Campaign Stalingrad
- 2023 – Bolt Action Second Edition: Campaign Case Blue
- 2017 – Bolt Action Second Edition: Campaign Sea Lion
- 2017 – Bolt Action Second Edition: Campaign Gigant – Operation Sea Lion: The Second Front
- 2019 – Bolt Action Second Edition: Campaign Fortress Budapest

The following expansions were published for Konflikt '47:

- 2017 – Konflikt ’47: Resurgence
- 2018 – Konflikt ’47: Defiance

== Reception ==
Bolt Action has been awarded a 7.8 out of 10 overall rating by BoardGameGeek. In 2014 Bolt Action won the Best Historical Game in the 2014 Annual Gaming Awards hosted by Wargaming news site Beasts of War. The game has also been described as the leading World War 2 wargame by many people worldwide.

== Adaptations ==
A faithful digital video game adaptation of the Bolt Action tabletop miniatures system from Warlord Games was announced in the Slitherine Next 2025 showcase on December 9, 2025. It is produced by Pakistan-based developer, FRAG Games, and publisher Slitherine. A Steam release was planned for 2026.

The PC game's environments are fully 3D, and units are shown like miniature pieces on a board. It also uses the system's mechanics like morale check, suppression, and realistic line-of-sight model. The battlefields are designed as wargaming dioramas. The game includes a dynamic single-player campaign set in a period from D-Day landings to battles of Normandy and northern France. Skirmish battles and multiplayer modes are included as well. The initial battle factions include US, UK, and German forces. They come with infantry, armour, and support units. The adaptation also mimics the painting hobby of miniature wargaming with an Army Painter mode. It lets players customize digital units.
