= Floor Games =

1911 book by H. G. Wells

- First edition (UK)
- Author: H. G. Wells
- Illustrator: J.R. Sinclair
- Language: English
- Publisher: Frank Palmer (UK); Small, Maynard & Co (US)
- Publication date: December 1911 (UK); 1912 (US)
- Pages: 71
- Followed by: Little Wars
- Text: Floor Games at Wikisource

Floor Games is a book published in 1911 by H. G. Wells. This light-hearted volume argues in a humorously dictatorial tone that "The jolliest indoor games for boys and girls demand a floor." Illustrated with photographs and drawings, it briefly describes a number of games that can be played on "well lit and airy" floors with "four main groups" of toys: soldiers about two inches high (Wells regrets the "curse of militarism" that makes civilians hard to find), largish wooden bricks, boards and planks, and electric railway rolling stock and rails. Various remarks show that the book is based on Wells's experience of playing such games with his two sons, George Philip "Gip" Wells (1901–1985) and Frank Richard Wells (1903–1982), identified here only by their initials at their family home, 17 Church Row, in the north west London district of Hampstead.

Although Floor Games is often characterized as a "companion book" to Wells's Little Wars (1913), the earlier book was conceived of as a self-standing volume so that the author might later write a book devoted purely to war games. Floor Games describes mostly specific games for young children, whereas Little Wars describes war games for older children and adults.

Wells describes how the boards and planks can be used to set up various imaginative geographies to play the "game of wonderful islands" in which the floor is the sea, create the setting for "twin cities" (to allow his two sons a measure of independence in their creations), or undertake engineering projects (he describes the building of funiculars in some detail).

During World War II, the toy soldiers that inspired Floor Games and Little Wars were among the possessions confiscated by the police from Wells's son (by Rebecca West) Anthony West, on account of his pacifism.

Floor Games has been regarded as a precursor not only of learning through play but also of nonverbal child psychotherapy. Along with Little Wars, the book has often been reprinted. A recent edition of the book was published by Skirmisher Publishing LLC in 2006 and includes a foreword by game design giant James F. Dunnigan an introduction by game designer and author Michael J. Varhola.
