= Wargames Illustrated =

Game magazine

Wargames Illustrated is a magazine dedicated to miniature wargaming which is focused on historical tabletop wargames. The monthly magazine has both paper and digital editions and maintains editorial, design and administrative staff in Nottingham, England.

The magazine reviews new products, provides advice on painting miniatures, produces campaign settings, and researches historical battles. It is in a large part based on submission of content from wargaming enthusiasts around the world.

Wargames Illustrated was conceived and originally owned and edited by Duncan Macfarlane (ex-Games Workshop manager). In January 2009 Macfarlane sold the magazine to Battlefront Miniatures of New Zealand. Battlefront employed Dan Faulconbridge as the UK Editor and Dave Taylor as the US Editor. In May 2015 Battlefront Miniatures sold Wargames Illustrated Limited to UK Editor Dan Faulconbridge, who since then has been the sole owner and editor.

== Wargame Rulesets ==
In addition to the magazine itself, the publisher also produces and publishes game rules, including notably Never Mind the Billhooks. The author of the rules, Andy Callan, observed over the years that most tabletop wargames take several hours or days to play, and are not well suited to small skirmishes such as the Battle of Nibley Green. Whilst less historically significant, he discovered that these smaller battles actually make for better gameplay. In response he produced a ruleset aimed at medieval battles of around 100 combatants per side, allowing games closer in duration to a traditional boardgame. Wargames Illustrated obtained the rights to publish the rules.

The ruleset has been well received by the gaming community, which, due to the interesting turns of events that typically take place during a game, often produces battle reports.

== Reviews ==
- Perfidious Albion #89 (April 1995) p.22
