= Historicon =

Gaming convention for historical wargames

Coordinates: 38.31576°N 77.50779°W

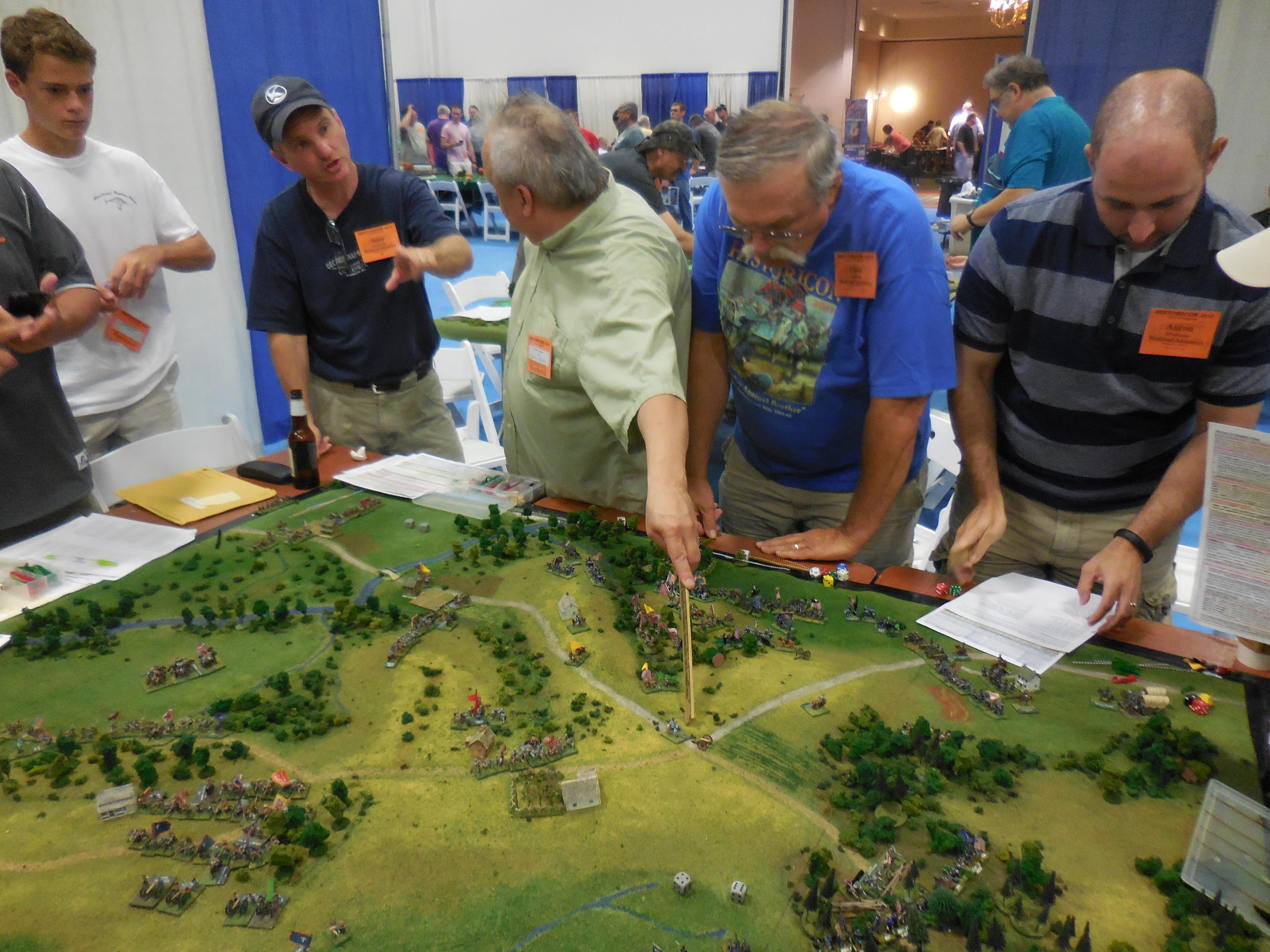
Scene at 2015 Historicon

Historicon is the largest gaming convention in North America devoted to solely historical miniature wargaming. It is sponsored by the Historical Miniatures Gaming Society, a nonprofit organization. The Wall Street Journal has described Historicon as the "mother of all wargaming conventions."

Historicon was held in Lancaster, Pennsylvania, at the Lancaster Host Resort, a hotel located on U.S. Route 30 in the heart of Pennsylvania Dutch and Amish country for many years.

== Description ==
Typically, Historicon is a four-day convention held in July each year since 1994. Thousands of miniature gamers and military history enthusiasts gather to play in hundreds of tabletop games, tournaments, and demonstrations. The convention is accompanied by a flea market of used gaming items and accessories, a large dealer hall offering new merchandise, a series of seminars and training sessions, painting competitions, and similar events. The majority of events are history-related, with the remainder being fantasy, science fiction, steampunk, or horror miniature games.

Each year, Historicon has a different theme and focal point (such as the American Civil War or World War II), and many games and supporting events are geared around the theme. Awards are presented to the Best Theme Event, as well as best games in specific time slots and other honors for particularly popular or impressive games.

== History ==
For many years it was held in Lancaster County, Pennsylvania. In 2012 it moved to Fredericksburg, Virginia at the Fredericksburg Expo Center, a convention center a mile from Interstate 95, the main highway on the East Coast of the United States. In 2018 Historicon moved back to Lancaster, Pennsylvania and was held at its previous home, the Lancaster Host Resort (now known as the Wyndham Lancaster Resort and Convention Center). In 2019 Historicon was held at its new home, the Lancaster County Convention Center.

In 2020, HMGS cancelled all of its conventions, including Historicon, due to COVID-19. In 2021, HMGS was again unable to hold Historicon during the usual mid-July timeframe; however, instead of cancelling again, they held it in mid-November, replacing the Fall In! convention that usually occurs at that time. The 2022 edition of the event was held at the Lancaster County Convention Center.

== Convention dates and themes ==
July 22–25, 2004 — "D-Day: 6 June 1944 and the Liberation of Western Europe"
July 21–24, 2005 — "The Age of Fighting Sale"
July 20–23, 2006 — "Africa's Independence – The Wars of Africa" 1905–2006
July 26–29, 2007 — "The Wars of South Asia: Afghanistan, Burma, India and Pakistan, 1800–2007"
July 24–27, 2008 — "The World on Fire – The first world war: The Seven Years and French & Indian Wars, 1754–63"
July 16–19, 2009 — "Ride to the Sound of the Guns… – Napoleon's 1809 Campaign and the Spanish Ulcer"
July 8–11, 2010 — "Pike and Shotte: Seventeenth Century Warfare" 1600–1699
July 8–10, 2011 — "Brother Against Brother: The American Civil War" 1861–1865
July 19–22, 2012 — "Colonial Warfare, Imperialism and Gunboat Diplomacy, 1836-1937"
July 18–21, 2013 — "American Civil War, 1863 – the Year of Decision"
July 17–20, 2014 — "Big Wars, Little Soldiers – World Wars throughout time"
July 16–19, 2015 — "End of Empires"
July 14–17, 2016 — "Cavalry, Mounted warfare through the ages"
July 13–16, 2017 — "100 Years of Tanks"
July 12–15, 2018 — "Wars of Conquest and Those That Lead Them"
July 11–14, 2019 — "Extreme Terrain Edition: Jungle Warfare"
July 8–12, 2020 — Cancelled due to Covid restrictions
November 10–14, 2021 — "Aircraft of War: Balloons, Bombers, Helicopters, and more..."
July 20–24, 2022 — "World in Conflict: Italy" July 19–23, 2023 — "America: Expansion and Civil War, 1789 to 1897"
