= Jack Scruby =

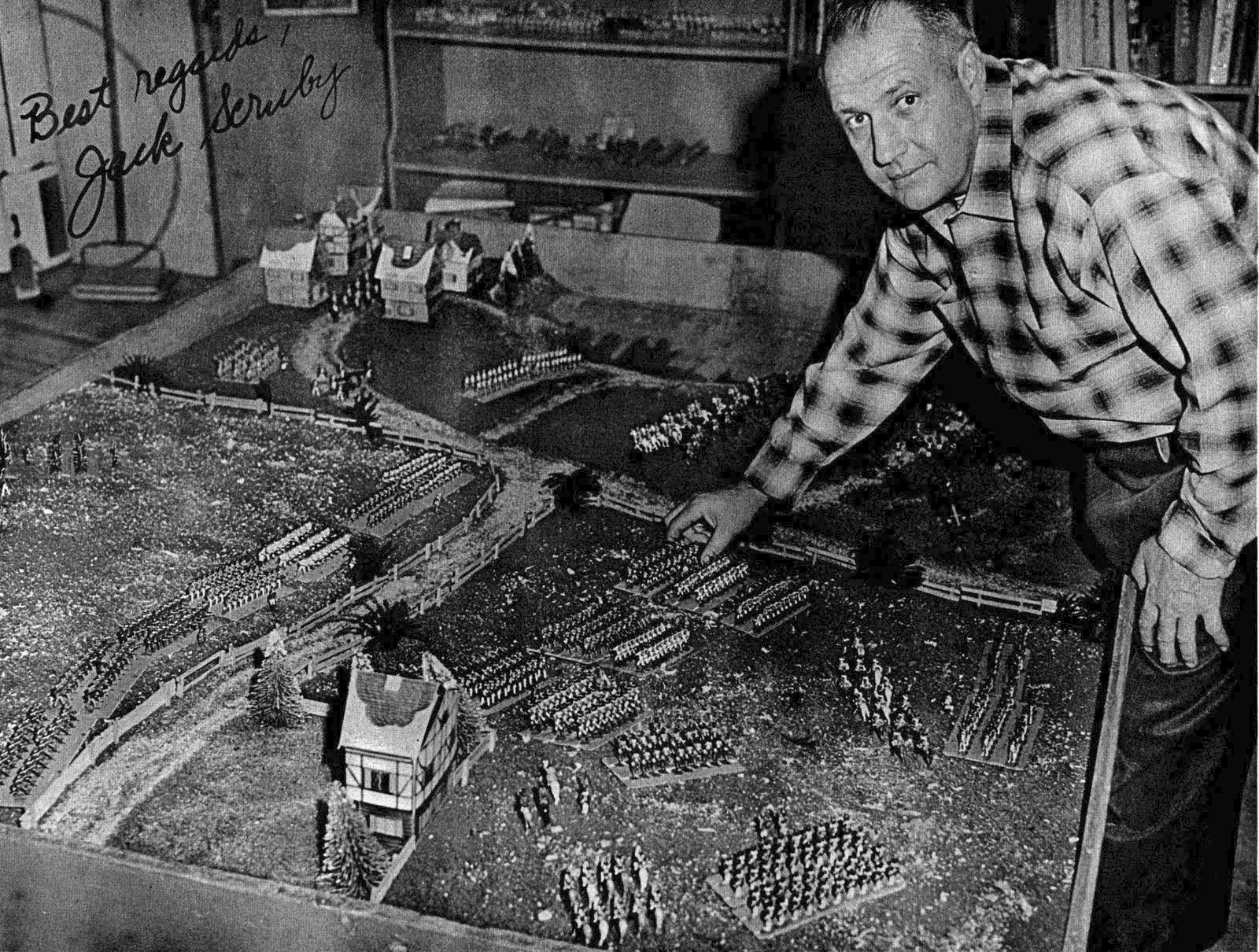
Jack Scruby, 1962

John Edwin Scruby (October 24, 1915 – September 1988) was a manufacturer of military miniatures whose efforts led to a rebirth of the miniature wargaming hobby in the late 1950s.

== Scruby and wargaming ==
To meet the needs of wargamers for inexpensive but historically accurate miniatures, Scruby began casting figures made of type metal in 1955 and selling them from his shop in central California. Scruby made innovative use of RTV rubber molds. In 1958 Scruby began selling figures of his own design which he sold for 15 cents apiece as late as 1962. In 1963 he began using the 50/50 tin/lead alloy that would remain the industry standard into the 1990s.

In 1956, he organized the first US (and perhaps first anywhere) miniatures convention in California, and in 1957, he launched War Game Digest, the first publication devoted to military miniatures gaming (initially with 50 subscribers). Published quarterly, War Game Digest became the publication around which the early miniatures hobby coalesced. In 1962, Scruby began to publish Table Top Talk, intended as a promotional publication for his lines of miniatures and sets of miniatures rules, and ceased publishing War Game Digest in 1963.

Jack Scruby was also a founder of a miniature wargaming club in 1971 along with Robert (Bob) Casey, Stephen (Steve) R. Casey, Elliot M. Derman, Michael (Mike) W. Frank, Raymond (Ray) James Jackson, Wayne Ludvickson, David Rusk, Ronald (Ron) Vaughan, and Harold (Hal) Windell. This Club was very informal and had no name until the meeting on October 7, 1972, when on a motion by Ray Jackson, his proposal to call the Club the San Joaquin Valley War Gaming Association (SJVWGA), was unanimously accepted. The Club then became a formal organization with dues and officers, but no written BY-Laws. The SJVWGA on the same date became a chapter of the now defunct Spartan International. The San Joaquin Valley War Gaming Association still exists to this day as a subdivision of the War Gaming Society (WGS).

From the late 1950s until October 1973, Jack Scruby's miniatures business was in Tulare County, specifically in or near Visalia. Then he moved to Cambria in San Luis Obispo County (the California coast near Hearst Castle) where he opened a retail shop, called like his mail-order business, The Soldier Factory. It was there that Charles Kuralt and his CBS On The Road crew came in August 1977 to film a segment for the CBS Evening News.

In 1975 Scruby introduced a line of fantasy figures using the 30mm scale advocated by Gary Gygax in Chainmail and appropriate for use with Dungeons & Dragons.

Jack Scruby's map of Mafrica

In addition to miniature figures, Scruby sold gaming newsletters and rulebooks alongside campaign maps of Mafrica, a fictional continent used as a campaign setting for miniature wargaming that he invented for use in 19th-century African Colonial period campaigns. A map of Mafrica was designed and marketed by Scruby. Publication of the map has been continued by HistoriFigs/Table Top Talk Press.

== Literature ==
=== Periodicals ===
- War Game Digest (1957-1963, 1971)
- Table Top Talk (1962-1967)
- Miniatures Parade (1967-?)
- The Soldier Factory News (1973-1974)

=== Rulebooks ===
- All About Wargames (1957)
- The Strategic-Tactical War Game (1961)
- Fire and Charge (1964)
