= Warlord Games =

Tabletop game company

Warlord Games Ltd
- Type: Private
- Industry: Miniature wargaming and Board game publisher
- Founded: 2007
- Headquarters: Nottingham, UK
- Key people: John Stallard, Paul Sawyer, Alessio Cavatore, Rick Priestley
- Products: Bolt Action (wargame)
- Website: Warlord Games

Warlord Games is a British miniatures and wargame publisher, based in Nottingham, UK.

== History ==
Warlord Games was started in 2007 by former Games Workshop employees John Stallard and Paul Sawyer. With Bob Naismith their first production was Roman legionary models. The Black Powder rules were bought from Rick Priestley; Rick then wrote Hail Caesar rules for Warlord. In July 2023, Warlord sold 25% of shares to Hornby for £1.25 million.

== Description ==
Warlord Games produces both miniatures for wargames as well as the wargames themselves. Black Powder, set in the era of the "horse and musket", is mentioned in several books dedicated to wargames set in this period. For example, Donald Featherstone, in his 2010 book Battle Notes for Wargamers, cites the rules used in Black Powder as especially suitable for recreations of the Battles of Wynendael, Prestonpans,(Jacobite uprising) Guilford Courthouse (American Revolution), Maida, Aliwal (Anglo-Sikh war), Wilson's Creek (American Civil War), Little Big Horn, and Modder River (Boer War)

Warlord Games's most popular game to date is the Second World War setting Bolt Action.

Their games are well known enough that they were used several times by Rick Priestley and John Lambshead in their 2016 book Tabletop Wargames: A Designers' and Writers' Handbook to illustrate various points. For example, Priestley and Lambshead point to the "Blunder Table" in the wargame Black Powder, using it as an example of a mechanism that "introduces a moment of high drama into the game. It drives the narrative of the battle. Although the result affects only one side the roll engages the attention of both." Likewise, Priestley and Lambshead use Bolt Action to explore nested systems of sequential mechanics, giving as the example "shooting that results in one or more hits (primary rolls) results in a morale effect (represented by a 'pin' state) even where all those hits fail to cause casualties (secondary rolls)."

Javier Gomez in his 2015 book Painting Wargaming Figures, used figurines produced by Warlord Games as examples to demonstrate various ways to paint historically accurate figurines for use with specific battles, including a Thirty Years War gun and crew, a Roman centurion and a Celtic warrior.

Their first standalone retail store is due to open in Wigan in Spring 2026, the location was chosen due to its North West location between Manchester and Liverpool.

=== Games ===
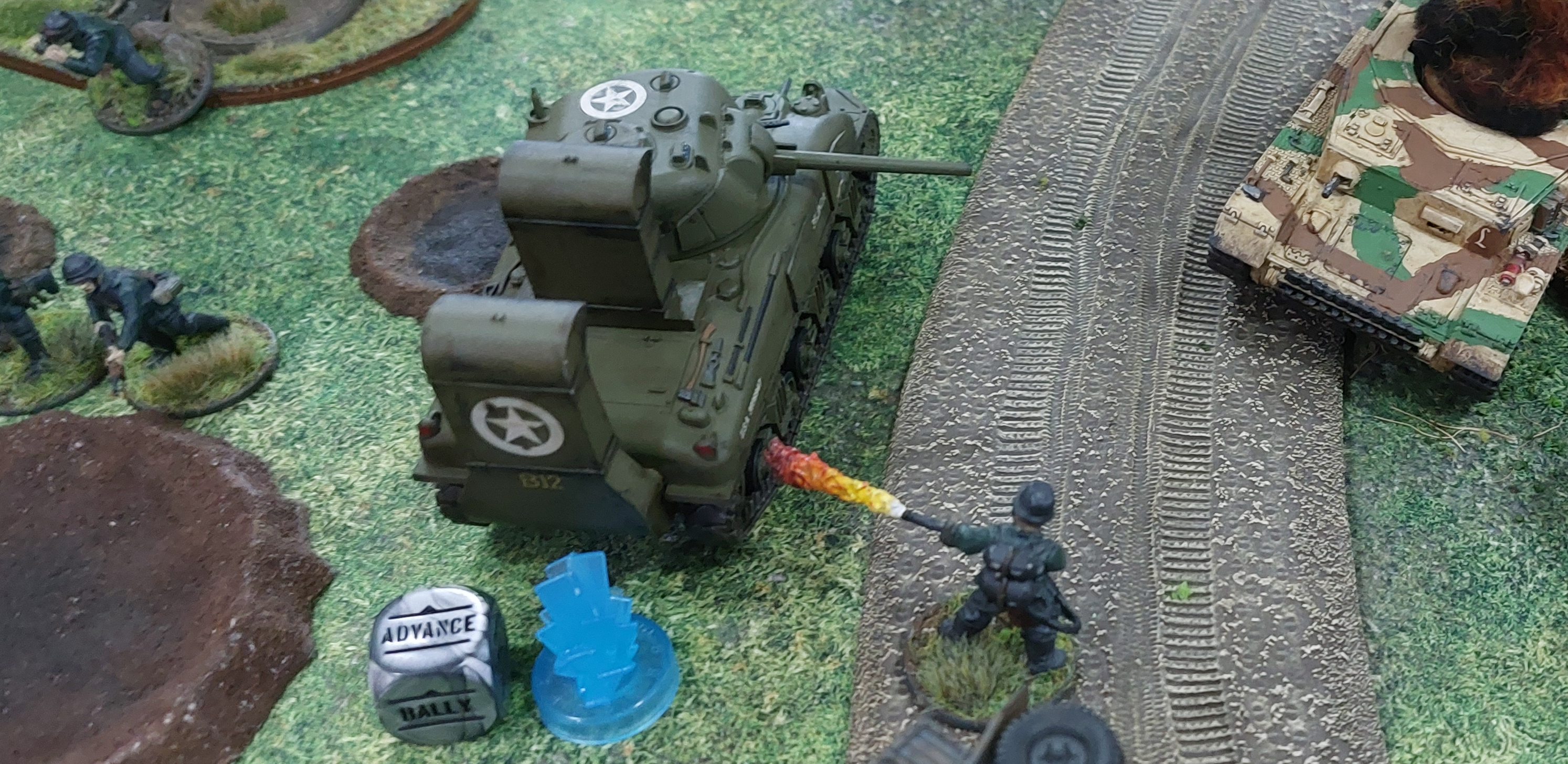
A game of Bolt Action, showing pin markers and order dice, unique to the system.

- Hail Caesar!
- Pike & Shotte (English Civil Wars and the Thirty Years' War)
- Black Powder
- Black Seas
- Bolt Action
- Blood Red Skies
- Konflikt '47 (alternate WWII history mixed with alien technology)
- Judge Dredd Miniatures Game (in conjunction with Mongoose Games)
- Beyond the Gates of Antares.
