= Michael O. Varhola =

American game designer

Michael O. Varhola (born September 24, 1966) is an author, publisher, and lecturer. He has written numerous books, games, and articles, and founded game development company and manufacturer Skirmisher Publishing LLC. He also served as the assistant editor of The Hilltop Reporter, a weekly newspaper located in Texas Hill Country.

== Education ==
Varhola is a 1993 graduate of University of Maryland, College Park, from which he received a B.S. in journalism. Other schools he attended include the Metropolitan State University of Denver, Colorado, and the American University of Paris. He graduated from high school at Carson Long Military Institute in New Bloomfield, Pennsylvania.

== Career ==
Varhola founded game development company and manufacturer Skirmisher Publishing LLC. He also served as the assistant editor of The Hilltop Reporter, a weekly newspaper located in Texas Hill Country.

Varhola has authored or co-authored the non-fiction books Everyday Life During the Civil War (1999), Fire and Ice: The Korean War, 1950-1953 (2000), D-Day: The Invasion of Normandy, June 6, 1944 (2001), Shipwrecks and Lost Treasure of the Great Lakes (2007), Ghosthunting Virginia (2008), Ghosthunting Maryland (2009), Life in Civil War America (2011), Texas Confidential: Sex, Scandal, Murder, and Mayhem in the Lone Star State (2011). He also wrote the fiction title Swords of Kos: Necropolis (2012).

Varhola is the co-author of several gaming books, including Experts (2002), Warriors (2003), Tests of Skill (2004), Nuisances (2005), Experts v.3.5 (2005), Nation Builder (2005), Gary Gygax's Gygaxian Fantasy Worlds Volume 6: Nation Builder (2006), H.G. Wells' Little Orc Wars (2007), Nuisances: Director's Cut (2007), and City Builder: A Guide to Designing Communities (2011).

Varhola published and wrote introductions to editions of H.G. Wells' Little Wars (2004) and Floor Games (2006) and Robert Louis Stevenson's Stevenson at Play.

== Personal life ==
In 1997, Varhola married Diane Varhola. In 2003, he changed his middle name from James to Odysseus, but did not start using it publicly until 2011.

== Bibliography ==
=== Non-fiction ===
- Everyday Life During the Civil War. Cincinnati: Writers Digest, 1999. ISBN 1-58297-337-7
- D-Day. El Dorado Hills, CA: Savas, 2000. ISBN 1-882810-46-5 (with Randy Holderfield)
- Fire and Ice: The Korean War, 1950-1953. El Dorado Hills, CA: Savas, 2000. ISBN 1-882810-43-0
- Armchair Reader: Civil War. Chicago: Publications International, 2007. ISBN 1-4127-1563-6 (with the Editors of Publications International)
- Shipwrecks and Lost Treasure of the Great Lakes. Guilford, CT: Globe Pequot, 2007. ISBN 0-7627-4492-8 (with Frederick Stonehouse and Paul G. Hoffman)
- Ghosthunting Virginia. Cincinnati: Clerisy Press, 2008. ISBN 1-57860-327-7, ISBN 978-1-57860-327-5
- Ghosthunting Maryland. Cincinnati: Clerisy Press, 2009. ISBN 1-57860-351-X, ISBN 978-1-57860-351-0 (with Michael H. Varhola)

=== Gaming books ===
- Experts. Skirmisher, 2002. ISBN 0-9722511-0-3 (with Paul O. Knorr)
- Warriors. Skirmisher, 2003. ISBN 0-9722511-1-1 (with Paul O. Knorr, Sharon Daugherty, and David L. Thomas)
- Tests of Skill. Skirmisher, 2004. ISBN 0-9722511-2-X (with Paul O. Knorr)
- Nuisances. Skirmisher Publishing, 2005. ISBN 0-9722511-4-6 (with Sharon Daugherty)
- Experts v.3.5. Skirmisher, 2005. ISBN 0-9722511-9-7 (with Paul O. Knorr and Perry Frix)
- Nation Builder. Little Rock, AR:Troll Lord Games, 2005. ISBN 1-931275-80-7 (with Gary Gygax)
- H.G. Wells' Little Orc Wars Quick-Play Rules. Skirmisher Publishing, 2007. ISBN 0-9777211-2-4 (with H.G. Wells)
