= Rick Priestley =

English miniature wargame designer and writer (born 1959)

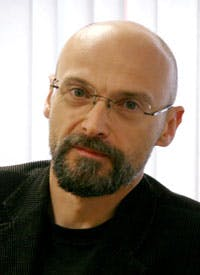
- Priestley in 2008
- Born: Richard Priestley; 29 March 1959 (age 67); Lincoln, England
- Education: Lancaster University
- Occupations: Miniature wargame designer, writer
- Known for: Co-creating Warhammer Fantasy Battle and Warhammer 40,000

Richard "Rick" Priestley (born 29 March 1959) is an English miniature wargame designer and writer. He co-created the miniature wargame Warhammer Fantasy Battle and its science fiction counterpart Warhammer 40,000 during his tenure at Games Workshop in the 1980s and 1990s. Following his time at Games Workshop, he went on to establish Warlord Games and co-create other titles such as Bolt Action.

== Early life and education ==
Priestley was born on 29 March 1959 in Lincoln, England. He studied Archaeology at Lancaster University, graduating in 1981.

== Career ==
Rick Priestley, with Bryan Ansell and Richard Halliwell, designed the fantasy miniature wargame Warhammer Fantasy Battle for Games Workshop. The company released the game in 1983. Priestley also developed a science fiction counterpart for this wargame, which was released as Warhammer 40,000: Rogue Trader in October 1987. Priestley, with Andy Jones and Marc Gascoigne of Warhammer, developed the idea for the Black Library which, as a result, produced the magazine Inferno! (July 1997–November 2004). In 2000, Priestley designed the 10mm-scale mass combat Fantasy wargame Warmaster.

Rick left Games Workshop in 2009, complaining that the corporate culture had grown too focused on sales and no longer cared about innovation in game design. He does consulting work on a freelance basis and is a consultant at River Horse Games. He was co-owner of Warlord Games, which sold 25% of its shares to Hornby in July 2023 for £1.25 million.

At the end of 2011 he was elected to the committee of the Society of Ancients. Priestley helped design the World War II miniature wargame Bolt Action prior to its 1st edition in 2012. In December 2012 he announced plans to launch a new science fiction game The Gates of Antares with an initial attempt at funding raised through Kickstarter. It was released as Beyond the Gates of Antares through Warlord Games in 2015.

== Works ==
Priestley worked extensively for Games Workshop. He is credited with designing or co-designing the following games:

- Reaper (1978; with Richard Halliwell; for Tabletop Games)
- Warhammer Fantasy Battle (1983; with Bryan Ansell and Richard Halliwell)
  - Terror of the Lichemaster, a set of three linked scenarios using the Warhammer Fantasy Battle rules (1986)
- Warhammer 40,000 (1987; with Andy Chambers, Jervis Johnson and Gavin Thorpe in later editions)
- Warhammer Ancient Battles (1998; with Jervis Johnson, Alan and Michael Perry)
- 1644 (1990)
- Confrontation (1994; with Bryan Ansell and Nigel Stillman)
- Necromunda (1995; with Andy Chambers and Jervis Johnson), a skirmish game set in the 40K setting
- Warmaster (2000; with Alessio Cavatore and Stephan Hess)
- Warmaster Ancients (2005)
- The Battle of Five Armies (2005)
- Legends of the Old West Alamo: Victory or Death (2006; with Mark Latham)
- The Lord of the Rings Strategy Battle Game (with Alessio Cavatore)

Since joining Warlord Games, he has designed or co-designed the following games:

- Black Powder (2009; with Jervis Johnson and John Stallard)
- Hail Caesar (2011)
- Bolt Action (2012; with Alessio Cavatore)
- All Quiet on the Martian Front (2014; with Ernest Baker and Alessio Cavatore; for Alien Dungeon)
- Beyond the Gates of Antares (2015)
- Warlords of Erehwon (2019)
- The Red Book of the Elf King (2018; for Lucid Eye Publications)
- Space Battles: A Spacefarers Guide (for Wombat Wargames)
