= Crossfire (miniatures game) =

Crossfire (commonly abbreviated as CF) is a tabletop miniatures wargame designed by Arty Conliffe and first published in 1996, later supplemented by "Hit the Dirt" containing a number of rules clarifications and scenarios. Crossfire was originally designed to allow for company-sized battles and World War II scenarios. It employs an innovative rules system eliminating the need for a ruler.

== Game Mechanics ==
The game needs neither a ruler nor fixed game turns. Essentially, CF knows only two ranges, point blank (in close assaults) and everything else, the basic assumption being that everything on the map is within rifle range - in other words, everything that can be seen can be hit. As a consequence, CF works only properly on tables where much terrain is used in order to allow movement unseen by the opponent.

In order to overcome traditional turn-based systems CF operates with "initiatives". A player can order his troops in any way (movement, fire or rally actions) and in any order during his initiative, and keeps on doing so until one of his actions fails; then the initiative passes on to his opponent.

CF in its basic form is mainly concerned with infantry combat, leaving not much room for the employment for AFVs. Nevertheless using AFVs in scenarios has become very popular with wargamers; therefore a number of different unofficial "home rules" have been published on fan sites, allowing the inclusion of AFVs in battles.

== Figure and Ground Scale ==
CF uses an abstract figure scale - a basic infantry stand (usually holding three figures) represents a squad of about 10 infantrymen while 2-3 heavy infantry weapons are represented by a single model; it is also playable on a 1/1 figure scale, though this is unsupported by the official rules and only a minority of gamers seem to prefer this. Crossfire takes place within small arms range. Though standard Crossfire gives no fixed ground scale Hit the Dirt gives one from around 1:300 to 1:500. The ground scale is a matter of discussion among CF wargamers; Ground scales from 1:1700 to 1:72 have been proposed and are in use. Others see it as variable ie urban combat would be denser than fighting at long range in the country side. Hit the Dirt supports the first interpretation, Crossfire supports the second.
