= Historical Miniatures Gaming Society =

The Historical Miniatures Gaming Society (or HMGS) promotes the hobby of historical miniature wargaming in the United States, as a registered non-profit charitable and educational foundation.

== Chapters ==
The organization consists of a loose-knit group of regional chapters, primarily located throughout the United States:

East
The largest chapter, East, has over 2,000 members worldwide, although the vast majority are from the East Coast of the United States. HMGS East sponsors three major gaming conventions (Historicon, Cold Wars, and Fall In!), as well as special events and seminars by distinguished historians.

Great Lakes
Runs the historicals events at the annual Origins Game Fair in Columbus, Ohio.

Midwest
Founded in 1984, the main event is hosting the Little Wars Convention. This is a 4 day gaming convention held at the end of April. Attendance varies from 500-700 people. Also running a series of smaller events throughout the year. There is a Monthly HMGS Night, running miniature games at Games Plus, in Mt. Prospect IL.
- The War Chest - A two day giant Swap Meet/Flea Market with games.
- Wars in Woodstock - A one day gaming event.
- Autumn Wars - A two day mini convention.
- Naval Wars - A one day naval gaming event.
- Tanksgiving (Toys 4 Tots) In conjunction with Battlefront and local hobby shops, in the area
HMGS-Midwest also runs a slate of games at other local conventions. Nexus, Origins, Air Wars, Gencon, Rockcon, Gamehole Con, Adepticon, and Garycon.: More information can be found at https://www.hmgsmidwest.com/ and https://www.facebook.com/HMGSMidwest:

South
Founded in March 1996, HMGS-South hosts two large gaming conventions ("Recon" in April and "Hurricon" in September) in Orlando, Florida.

Mid-South
Hosts the Siege of Augusta in Augusta, Georgia during mid January, as well as Nashcon in Nashville, TN, during the summer.

West
Founded in March 1997, HMGS-West assists large gaming conventions.
