= Tactical Command =

Tactical Command is a 1995 board game published by Medallion Simulations.

== Gameplay ==
Tactical Command is a game in which detailed terrain and miniature armored units are included.

== Publication history ==
Tactical Command was designed by Scot Hunt and published by Medallion Simulations. Echelons of Fire was derived from the Tactical Command miniatures game.

== Reception ==
Pyramid magazine reviewed Tactical Command and stated that "It was here that I saw my first 1/285th scale tank battle. I took in the eight-foot table in front of me covered with small armored companies fighting it out among miniature trees, hills, and buildings. The only drab counters on the hexless battlefield seemed almost incidental to the highly detailed tanks dominating the board. I wanted to play right then. I hung around watching for about an hour and my excitement began to fade. The players spent most of their time bickering over the multiple copies of rule books strewn about. At one point I saw them consult a calculator to determine the line-of-sight between two units."
