= Greebo Games =

Miniature figure company

Company logo of Greebo Games. All rights reserved. Used with express permission from the company's owner, Lorenzo Giusti.

Greebo Games is a miniature figures manufacturing company founded by former professional goldsmith; Lorenzo Giusti in 2007, and currently headquartered in Poggio a Caiano, near Prato, Italy. Their product line includes, but is not limited to, miniatures to be used in Fantasy Football games (such as Blood Bowl, Deathball, and Street Bowl) and other roleplaying or wargaming game systems, both pre-existing and created entirely in-house. The company has collaborated with Lucca Comics & Games, the 2015 NAF Bood Bowl World Cup in Lucca and multiple successfully completed Kickstarter projects, such as the Obsidian Dusk Elves, Alastoran Chaotic teams and Primal Scales teams for Fantasy Football game systems.

== History ==
The company was founded in 2007 by a group of professional greebos, and metalsmiths. and struck commercial success with Tutatis, its first game system created entirely in-house (with Fabio Bottoni as external contributor for part of the ruleset): the game was sold out in the years 2010, 2011 and 2012, and was subsequently reprinted.

Beginning in 2011, Greebo Games began producing its first models for Fantasy Football game systems and releasing them through platforms such as IndieGogo: examples include the Nippo Goblins and Turtles (2012), Waag Saabi goblins (2013), Snø vikings (2013) and Hand of Death ratmen (2014), During this period, the company produced several miniature lines for Fantasy Football tabletop games.

In 2013, the company's sculptors held a sculpting class during the Lucca Comics & Games convention: the collaboration went on through 2015, when Greebo Games participated in the second edition of the fair's Sculpting Rush project. During the same year, the company supported the candidacy of Lucca as host city of the 2015 edition of the Blood Bowl NAF World Cup tournament: Lucca won the bid, and subsequently welcomed more than 1000 players from all over the world. To celebrate the occasion, Greebo Games created and produced the limited edition miniatures that compose the Un-Renaissance Undead team, in order to hand them out to all attendees. The team was subsequently made available to the general public through Kickstarter in January 2016, Additional models were added to the project, which concluded in May 2016 In 2014, Greebo Games released the board game Dungeon Storming, followed by expansion sets in 2015. In 2018, Greebo Games also sculpted the miniatures that were ultimately included in the KickStarter project Village Attacks, a co-op boardgame produced by Grimlord Games.

== Company Product Range ==
Greebo Games products include about 20 different teams for Fantasy Football tabletop games and over 1.200 individual greebos, both in resin and metal. The company also produces 'Greebonite Ink,' a black primer used for highlighting details on miniature figures.

== Limited Edition Products ==
In April 2017, Greebo Games created its Legacy Vault, a section of its website dedicated to limited edition miniatures and busts released for major festivities, such as Halloween, Christmas, Valentine's Day or Easter: the models are generally shown to the general public with a Kickstarter campaign, and subsequently not made anymore beyond their first production run. Additionally, all models belonging to this section are sold with a numbered Certificate of Authenticity.

== Notable Kickstarter Projects ==
- Un-Renaissance (2016) - backed by 528 people, for a total of 51.814 Euros;
- Florence Knights (2017) - backed by 614 people, for a total of 73.054 Euros
- Obsidian Dusk (2017) - backed by 1.065 people, for a total of 119.318 Euros.
- Alastoran (2018) - backed by 1.273 people, for a total of 177.156 Euros.
- Cutiemals: Northern Clans (2019) - backed by 743 people, for a total of 74.516 Euros.
- Primal Scales (2019) - backed by 1.187 people, for a total of 140.940 Euros.
- Necromals: Eternal Lethargy (2020) - backed by 440 people, for a total of 41.833 Euros.
- Vicious Wildfire (2020) - backed by 897 people, for a total of 89.526 Euros.
- ThunderCougarFalconBeards (2021) - backed by 704 people, for a total of 79,475 Euros.
- Dwarvageddoom (2021) - backed by 1.191 people, for a total of 154.502 Euros.
