= Miniature wargame =

Wargame genre

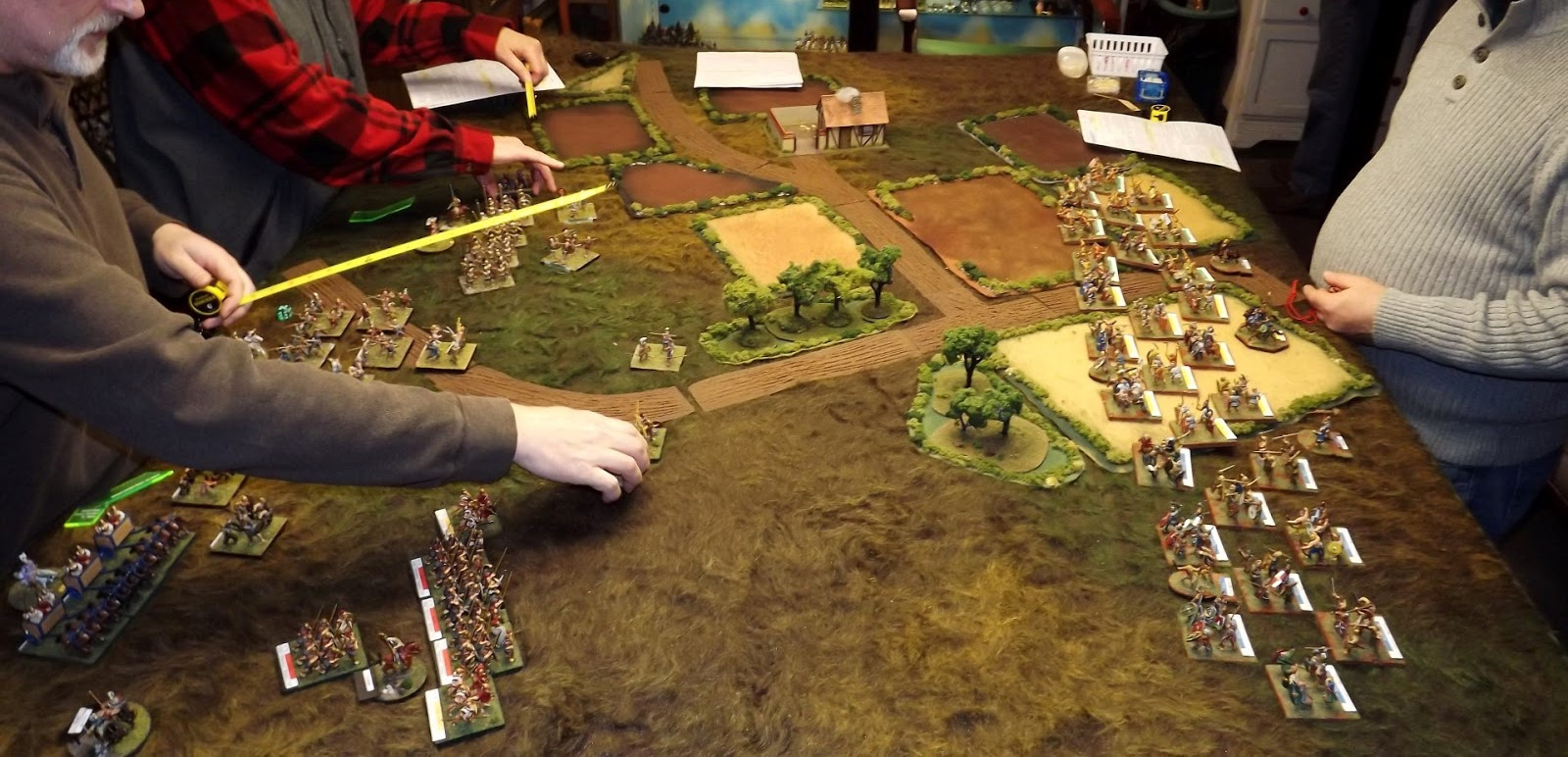
Players re-enacting the Battle of Thebes, using the homebrew ruleset Hannibal at the Gates

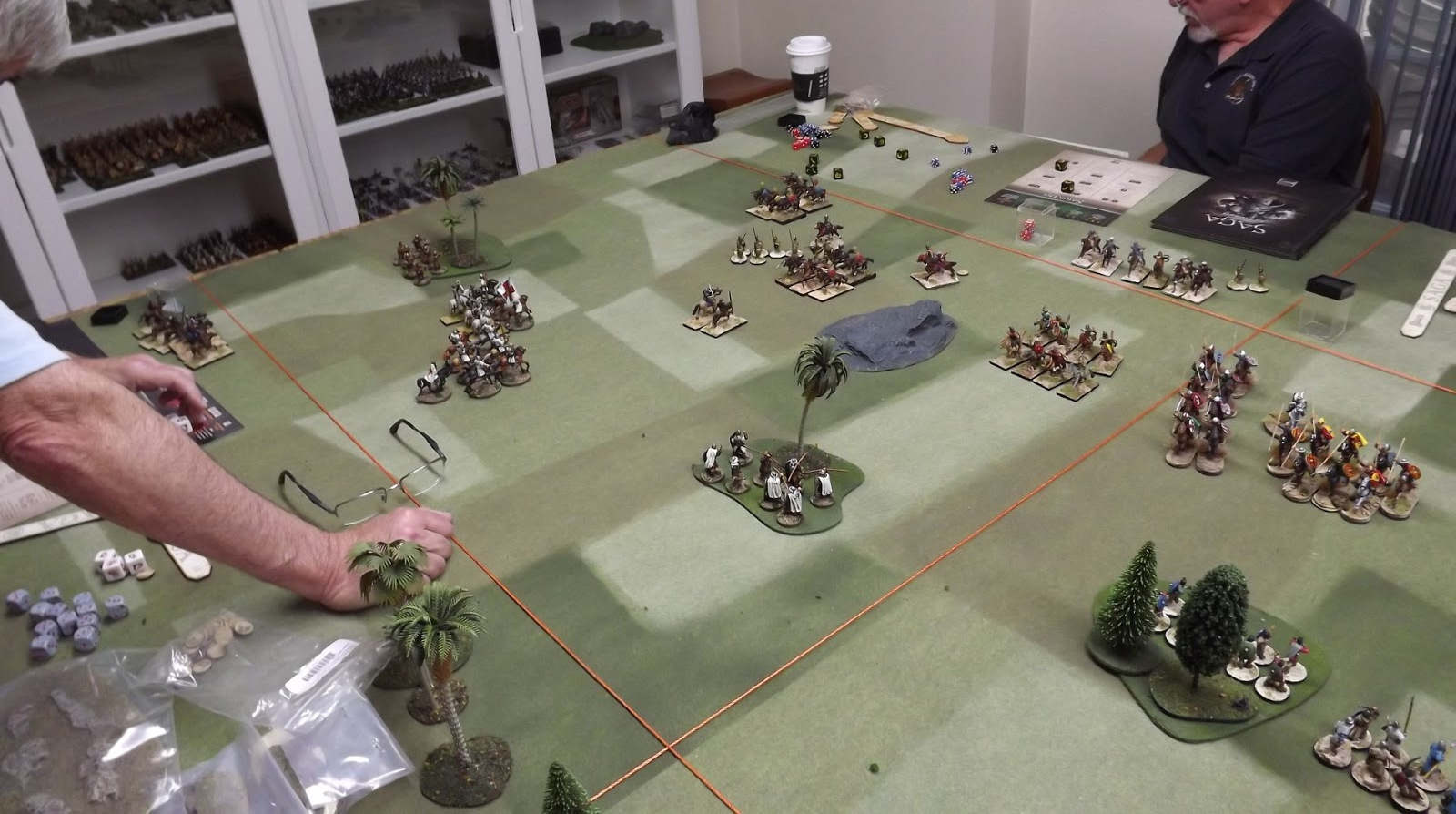
A miniature wargame

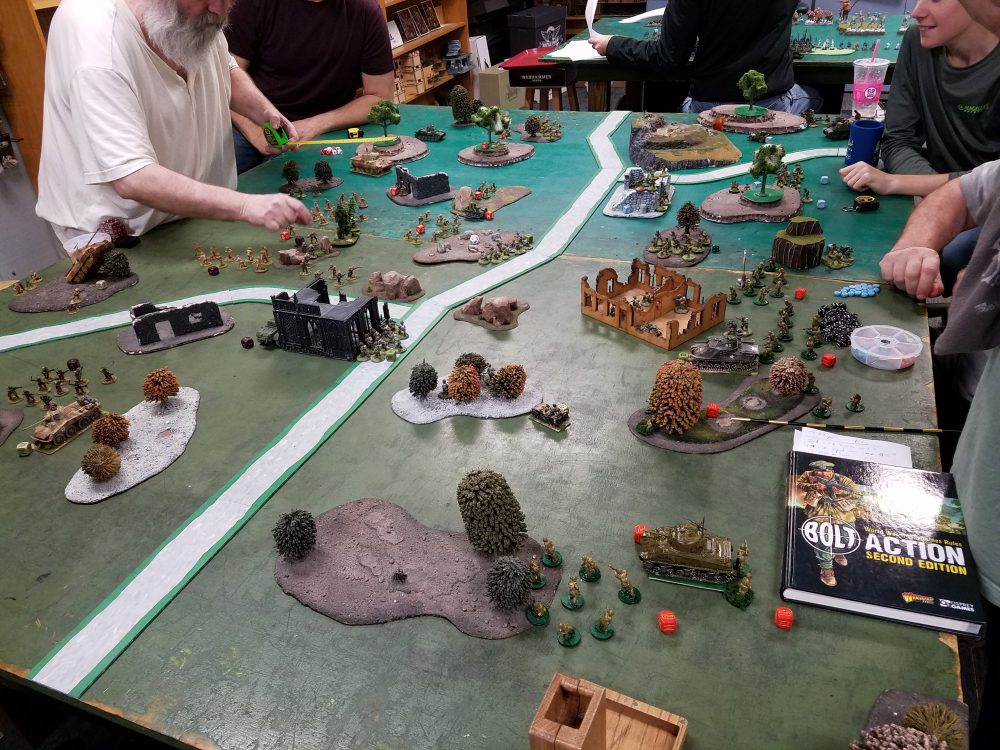
A game of Bolt Action, with the rule book and some "order dice" in view

A miniature wargame is a type of tabletop wargame in which military units are represented by miniature figurines on a model battlefield. These wargames are played with the primary appeal being recreational rather than operational, using model soldiers, vehicles, and artillery on custom-made battlefields, often with modular terrain, and abstract scaling is used to adapt real-world ranges to the limitations of table space. The use of physical models to represent military units is in contrast to other tabletop wargames that use abstract pieces such as counters or blocks, or computer wargames which use virtual models. The primary benefit of using models is immersion, though in certain wargames the size and shape of the models can have practical consequences on how the match plays out. Models' dimensions and positioning are crucial for measuring distances during gameplay. Issues concerning scale and accuracy compromise realism too much for most serious military applications.

Miniature wargames can be skirmish-level, where individual warriors are controlled, or tactical-level, where groups are commanded. Most wargames are turn-based, involving movement and combat resolved through arithmetic and dice rolls. The setting of a game determines the type of units used, with popular historical themes including WWII, the Napoleonic Wars, and the American Civil War, while Warhammer 40,000 is the leading science fiction setting. Models, historically made from lead or tin, are now typically made of plastic or resin, with larger companies favoring plastic for its mass-production advantages. While some companies sell pre-painted models, most require assembly and customization by players. In historical miniature wargames, generic models are used, but fantasy wargames, like Warhammer, feature proprietary models, making them more expensive.

The community is social, with conventions and clubs playing a significant role. Painting and assembling models are integral aspects of the hobby. The hobby primarily attracts older enthusiasts due to the time, skill, and financial investment required.

== Overview ==
A miniature wargame is played with miniature models of soldiers, artillery, and vehicles on a model of a battlefield. The benefit of using models as opposed to abstract pieces is primarily an aesthetic one. Models offer a visually-pleasing way of identifying the units on the battlefield. In most miniature wargame systems, the model itself may be irrelevant as far as the rules are concerned; what really matters is the dimensions of the base that the model is mounted on. Distances between infantry units are measured from the base of the model. The exception to this trend may be models of vehicles such as tanks, which do not require a base to be stable and have naturally rectangular shapes; in such cases, the distances between units may be measured from the edge of the model itself. Some miniature wargames use the dimensions of the model to determine whether a target behind cover is within line-of-fire of an attacker.

Most miniature wargames are turn-based. Players take turns to move their model warriors across the model battlefield and declare attacks on the opponent. In most miniature wargames, the outcomes of fights between units are resolved through simple arithmetic, usually combined with dice rolls or playing cards.

All historical wargames have a setting that is based on some historical era of warfare. The setting determines what kind of units the players can deploy in their match. For instance, a wargame set in the Napoleonic Wars should use models of Napoleonic-era soldiers, wielding muskets and cannons, and not spears or automatic rifles. A fantasy wargame has a fictional setting and may thus feature fictional or anachronistic armaments, but the setting should be similar enough to some real historical era of warfare so as to preserve a reasonable degree of realism. For instance, Warhammer Age of Sigmar is mostly based on medieval warfare, but includes supernatural elements such as wizards and dragons. The most popular historical settings are World War 2, the Napoleonic Wars, and the American Civil War (in that order). The most popular fantasy setting is Warhammer 40,000.

Miniature wargames are played either at the skirmish level or the tactical level. At the skirmish level, the player controls the warriors individually, whereas in a tactical level game he or she controls groups of warriors—typically the model warriors are mounted in groups on the same base. Miniature wargames are not played at the strategic or operational level because at that scale the models would become imperceptibly tiny.

Miniature wargames are generally played for recreation, as the physical limitations of the medium prevents it from representing modern warfare accurately enough for use in military instruction and research (see the section below on abstract scaling for one reason). A historical exception to this is naval wargaming before the advent of computers.

== Models ==
Historically, these models were commonly made of tin or lead, but nowadays they are usually made of polystyrene or resin. Plastic models are cheaper to mass-produce but require a larger investment because they require expensive steel molds. Lead and tin models, by contrast, can be cast in cheap rubber molds. Larger firms such as Games Workshop prefer to produce plastic models, whereas smaller firms with less money prefer metal models.

Wargaming figurines often come with unrealistic body proportions. Their hands may be oversized, or their rifles excessively thick. One reason for this is to make the models more robust: thicker parts are less likely to bend or break. Another reason is that manufacturing methods often stipulate a minimum thickness for casting because molten plastic has difficulty flowing through thin channels in the mold. Finally, odd proportions may actually make the model look better for its size by accentuating certain features that the human eye focuses on.

=== Assembly and painting ===
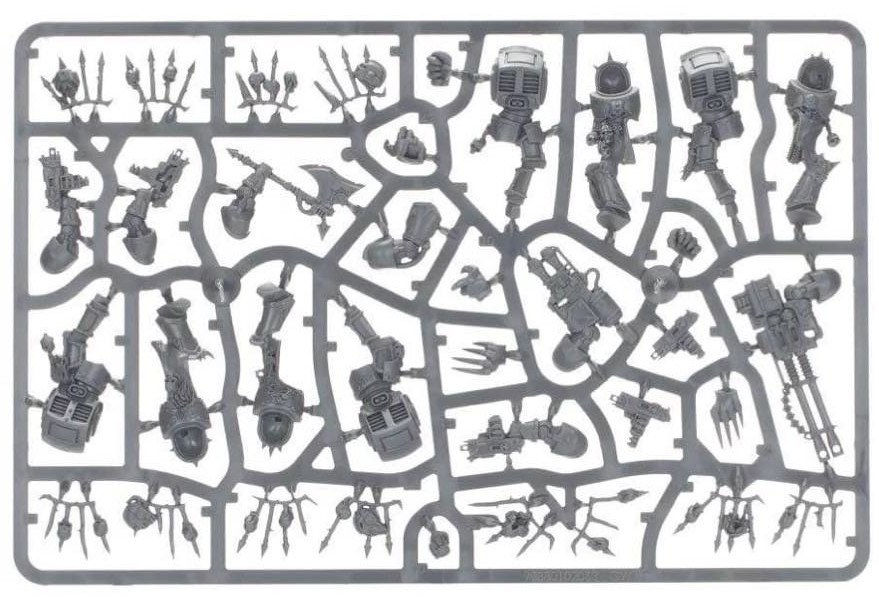
Wargaming miniatures are usually sold in parts, with plastic ones still attached to their sprues. The parts must be cut out and glued together.

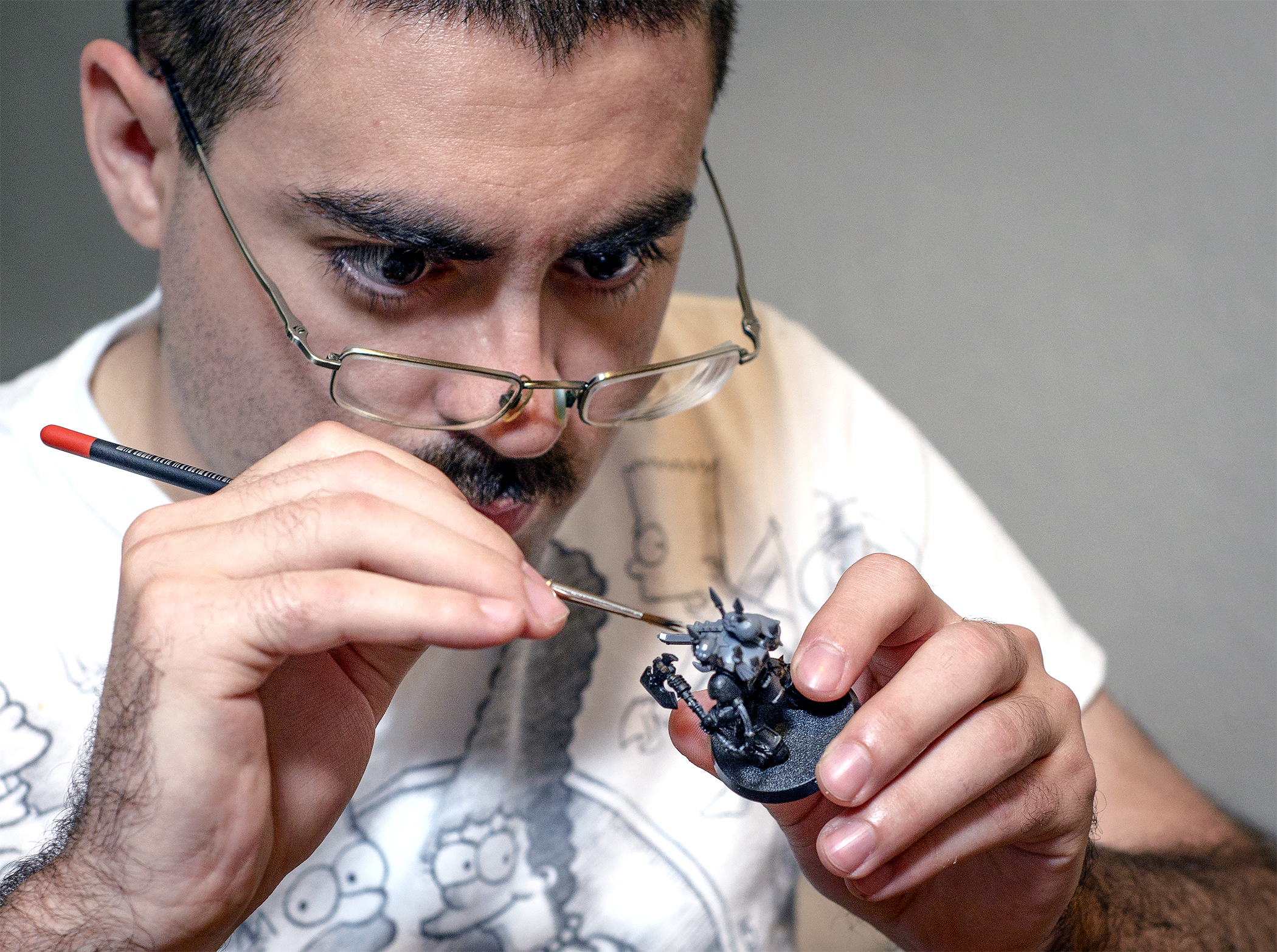
The assembly and painting of models is a major aspect of the hobby, as much as the actual game.

Wargaming models are often sold in parts. In the case of plastic models, they're often sold still affixed to their sprues. The player is expected to cut out the parts and glue them together. This is the norm because, depending on the design of the model, it may not be possible to mold it whole, and selling the parts un-assembled saves on labor costs. After assembling the model, the player should then paint it to make it more presentable and easier to identify on the game table. Understandably, the time and skill involved in assembling and painting models deters many people from miniature wargaming. Some firms have tried to address this by selling pre-assembled and pre-painted models, but these are rare because, with current technologies, it is hard to mass-produce ready-to-play miniatures that are both cheap and match the beauty of hand-painted models. The other options for players are to buy finished models second-hand or hire a professional painter.

=== Proprietary models vs generic models ===
Historical miniature wargames are typically designed to use generic models. It is generally not possible to copyright the look of a historical soldier. Anyone, for instance, may freely produce miniature models of Napoleonic infantrymen. A player of a Napoleonic-era wargame could thus obtain their models from any manufacturer who produces Napoleonic models at the requisite scale. Consequently, it is difficult if not impossible for a historical wargame designer to oblige players to buy models from a certain manufacturer. By contrast, fantasy wargames feature fictional warriors, and fictional characters can be copyrighted. By incorporating original characters into their wargame, a wargame designer can oblige the player to purchase their models from a specific manufacturer who is licensed to produce the requisite models. An example of this is Warhammer 40,000 which features many original characters who have a distinctive aesthetic, and Games Workshop and its subsidiaries reserve the exclusive right to manufacture models of these characters. Games Workshop models tend to be expensive because competing manufacturers are not allowed to offer cheaper copies of official Warhammer 40,000 models. While there's nothing to stop players using foreign wargaming models (generics or proprietary models from other wargames), doing so could spoil the aesthetic and cause confusion.

== Playing field ==
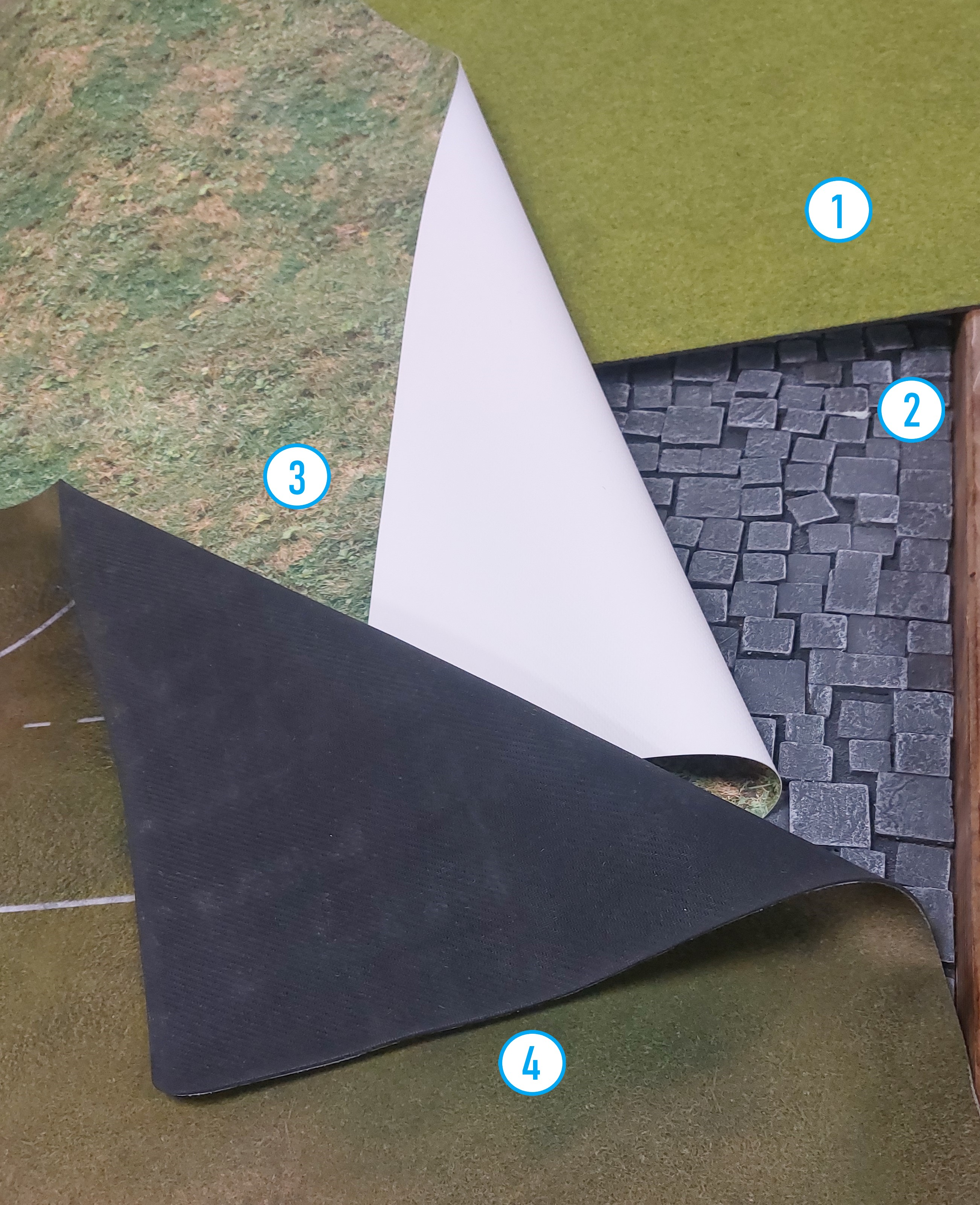
Different gaming table surfaces 1: Gaming board with artificial grass 2: Modelled gaming plate 3: Plastic mat with printed grass 4: Mousepad mat with printed grass

A miniature wargame is played on a model of a battlefield. The model battlefield is usually mounted on a table. As far as size goes, every part of the battlefield should be within arm's reach of the players; a width of four feet is recommended.

Most miniature wargames are played on custom-made battlefields made using modular terrain models.

Historical wargamers sometimes re-enact historical battles, but this is relatively rare. Players more often prefer to design their own scenarios. The first advantage is that they can design a scenario that fits the resources they have at hand, whereas reconstructing a historical battle may require them to purchase additional models and rulebooks, and perhaps a larger game table. The second advantage is that a fictional scenario can be designed such that either player has a fair chance of winning.

Miniature wargames are rarely set in urban environments. The first reason is that it is harder to reach models when there are many buildings in the way. Another reason is that the buildings may highlight the abstract scale at which the wargame operates. For instance, in the 28 mm wargame Bolt Action, a rifle's range is 24 inches, which is barely the length of a few houses at 28 mm scale. If placed in an urban environment, a rifleman would not be able to hit a target at the far end of a small street, which shatters the illusion of realism.

== Scale ==
=== Model size ===
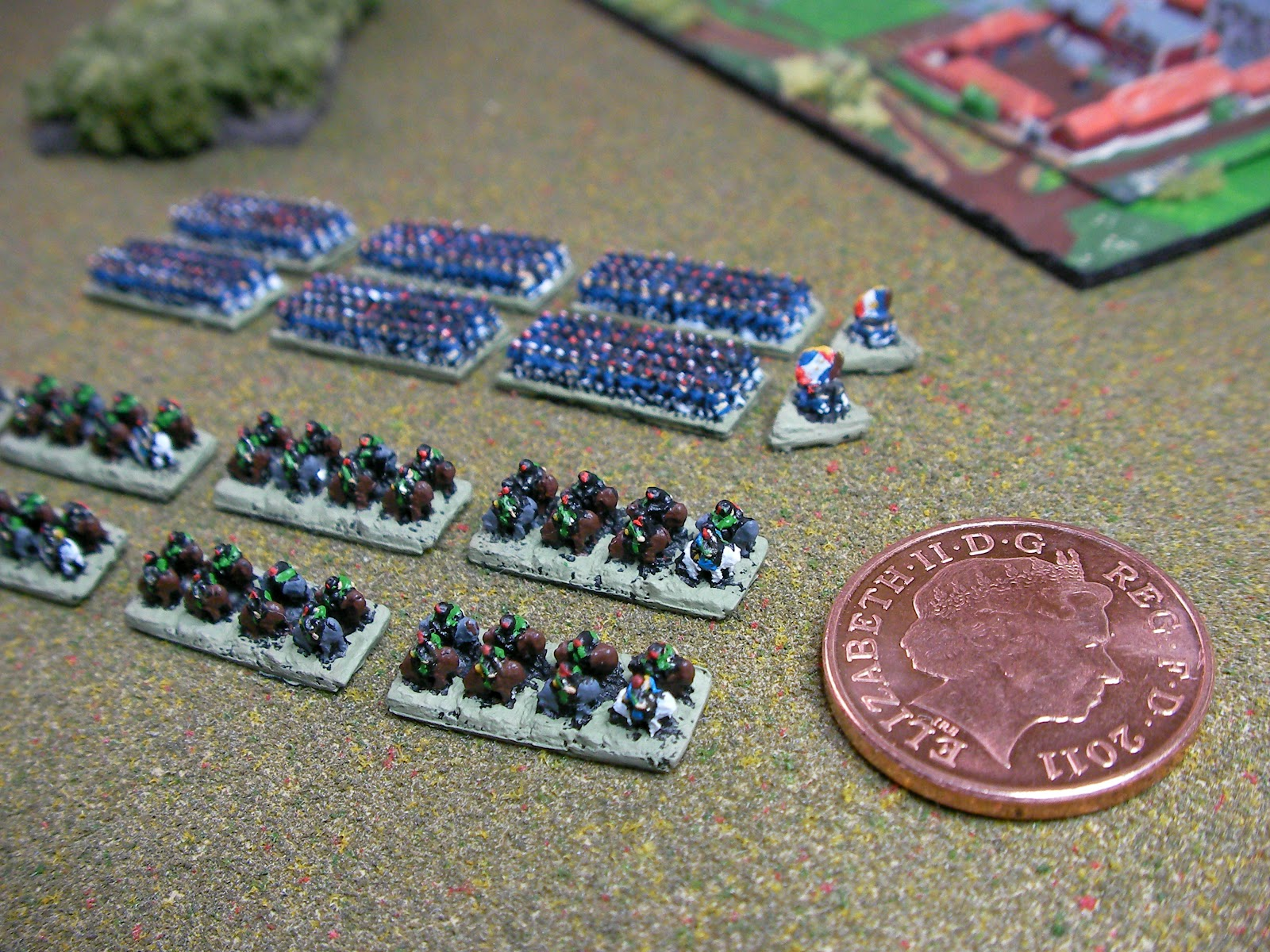
2 mm wargaming models

The scale of a model vehicle can be expressed as a scale ratio. A scale ratio of 1:100 means that 1 cm represents 100 cm; at this scale, if a model car is 4.5 cm long, then it represents a real car that is 4.5 m long.

When it comes to figurines of humans, the preferred method of expressing scale is the height of a figurine in millimeters. There is no standardized system of measuring figurine size in the wargaming hobby. Some manufacturers measure the height of a figurine up to the crown of the head, whereas others may measure it up to the eyes (the latter is more sensible if the figurine is wearing a hat). Furthermore, the advertised scale of a model may not reflect its actual scale. In order to make their products stand out against their competitors, some manufacturers make their models a little oversized, e.g. a model from a certain manufacturer that is advertised as suitable for 28 mm wargames could actually be 30 mm tall in practice. This makes the model look more imposing, and allows for more detail.

Manufacturers of generic wargaming models are generally obliged to build their models to some standard scale so as to ensure compatibility with third-party wargames. Manufacturers who make proprietary models designed exclusively for use in a specific wargame do not have this concern. For instance, Warhammer 40,000 officially does not have a scale. It doesn't need to conform to a standard scale, because Games Workshop is the exclusive manufacturer of official Warhammer 40,000 models, said models are intended exclusively for use in Warhammer 40,000, and Games Workshop doesn't want players using foreign models from other manufacturers.

Figurine sizes and roughly equivalent scale ratios (Note: This table assumes the figurine represents a 1.78 m man, which is the average height of a modern European man, and that the figurine is measured from the base of the feet to the crown of the head.)
mm	90	54	45	28	25.4(1")	25	20	15	6	2
scale	1:20	1:32	1:40	1:64	1:72	1:73	1:89	1:120	1:300	1:890

=== Abstract scaling ===
Most miniature wargames do not have an absolute scale, i.e. where the figurines, terrain, movement and firing ranges all conform to single scale ratio. This is largely because of the need to compress the battle into the confined space of a table surface. Instead, miniature wargames prefer to use abstract scaling.

For example, a 28 mm model rifleman realistically ought to be able to hit a target from 20 feet away, (Note: If the 28 mm scale corresponds to a ratio of 1:64, then an M1 Garand rifle, which has an effective range of about 500 yards, should be able to hit a target 23 feet away at this scale.) but this is larger than most tables. A miniature wargame would not be much fun if the models could shoot each other from opposite ends of the table, and thus not have to maneuver around the battlefield. The 28 mm wargame Bolt Action solves this problem by compressing the range of a rifle to just 24 inches; likewise, a sub-machine gun's range is 12 inches and a pistol's range is 6 inches. These ranges may not be realistic, but at least their proportions do make intuitive sense, giving an illusion of realism.

Abstract scaling may also be applied to figures and terrain features, e.g. model houses and trees may be a little undersized compared the scale so as to make more room on the table for the warriors. Like wise model figures will often be oversize for the scale, for example many games use 25 mm figures appropriate to a 1:60 scale when the game is played at a larger scale such as 1:360.

=== Time ===
Most miniature wargames do not have a fixed time scale (i.e. how many seconds a turn represents). Most wargame rulebooks instead prefer to define how far a unit can move in a turn, and this movement range is proportioned to the size of a typical game table. For example, Bolt Action sets a movement range of six inches in a turn for most units.

== Rules ==
There are many miniature wargaming rules, not all of which are currently in print, including some which are available free on the internet; many gamers also write their own, creating so-called "house rules" or "club sets". Most rules are intended for a specific historical period or fictional genre. Rules also vary in the model scale they use: one infantry figure may represent one man, one squad, or much larger numbers of actual troops.

Wargaming in general owes its origins to military simulations, most famously to the Prussian staff training system Kriegsspiel. Consequently, rules designers struggle with the perceived obligation to actually 'simulate' something, and with the seldom compatible necessity to make an enjoyable 'game'. Historical battles were seldom fair or even, and the potential detail that can be brought to bear to represent this in a set of rules always comes at the cost of pace of the game and enjoyment. In Osprey Publishing's book about the Battle of Crécy, from its series on historical campaigns, there is included a detailed section on wargaming the battle, in which Stuart Asquith writes:

When refighting a particular battle, it is important to adhere as closely as possible to the original historical engagement. The counter-argument is that the wargamer(s) know who is going to win. Fair comment, but knowing the outcome of any battle does not usually prevent one from reading about that action, so why should such knowledge debar a refight?

He adds that unless at least the initial moves are recreated, "then an interesting medieval battle may well take place, but it will not be a re-creation of Crécy." Still, rules aimed at the non-professional hobby market therefore inevitably contain abstractions. It is generally in the area of the abstraction liberties taken by the designers that the differences between rules can be found. Most follow tried and true conventions to the extent that a chess player would recognize wargaming merely as a different scaled version of their own game.

=== Role-playing games ===
During the 1960s and 1970s, two new trends in wargaming emerged: First were small-unit rules sets which allowed individual players to portray small units down to even a single figure. These rules expanded the abilities of the smaller units accordingly, to magnify their effect on the overall battle.

Second was an interest in fantasy miniatures wargaming. J.R.R. Tolkien's novel The Hobbit and his epic cycle The Lord of the Rings were gaining strong interest in the United States, and as a result, rules were quickly developed to play medieval and Roman-era wargames, where these eras had previously been largely ignored in favor of Napoleonic and American Civil War gaming.

The two converged in the early 1970s. The first known occurrence, from 1970, is a set of rules by Len Patt published in The New England Wargames Association's bulletin, The Courier. In 1971 a set of medieval miniatures rules entitled Chainmail, published by a tiny company called Guidon Games, headquartered in Belfast, Maine included a fantasy supplement detailing rules for battle involving fantastic creatures. Later, in 1974, TSR designer E. Gary Gygax wrote a set of rules for individual characters under Chainmail, and entitled it Dungeons & Dragons. Further developments ensued, and the role-playing game hobby quickly became distinct from the wargaming hobby which preceded it.

=== Naval wargames ===
Although generally less popular than wargames set on land, naval wargaming nevertheless enjoys a degree of support around the world. Model ships have long been used for wargaming, but it was the introduction of elaborate rules in the early 20th century that made the hobby more popular. Small miniature ships, often in 1:1200 scale and 1:1250 scale, were maneuvered on large playing surfaces to recreate historical battles. Prior to World War II, firms such as Bassett-Lowke in England and the German company Wiking marketed these to the public. After World War II, several manufacturers started business in Germany, which remains the center of production to this day, while other companies started in England and the United States.

Rules can vary greatly between game systems; both in complexity and era. Historical rulesets range from the ancient and medieval ships to the fleets of the Age of Sail and the modern era. Often the hobbyists have to provide their own models of ships. The 1972 game, Don't Give Up The Ship!, called for pencil and paper, six-sided dice, rulers and protractors, and model ships, ideally of 1:1200 scale. The elaborate rules cover morale, sinking, fires, broken masts, and boarding. Dice determined wind speed and direction, and hence the ship's speed and the use of its cannon by measuring angles with the protractor.

In naval wargaming of the modern period, General Quarters, primarily (though not exclusively) using six-sided dice, has established itself as one of the leading sets of World War I and II era rules.

Some land-based miniature wargames have also been adapted to naval wargaming. All at Sea, for example, is an adaptation of The Lord of the Rings Strategy Battle Game rules for naval conflicts. The game's mechanics centered around boarding parties, with options for ramming actions and siege engines. As such, the ship's scale ratio corresponds to the 25 mm scale miniatures used by The Lord of the Rings. Model ships are built by hobbyists, just as normal miniature terrain, such as "great ships" of Pelargir, cogs of Dol Amroth and Corsair galleys.

=== Air wargames ===
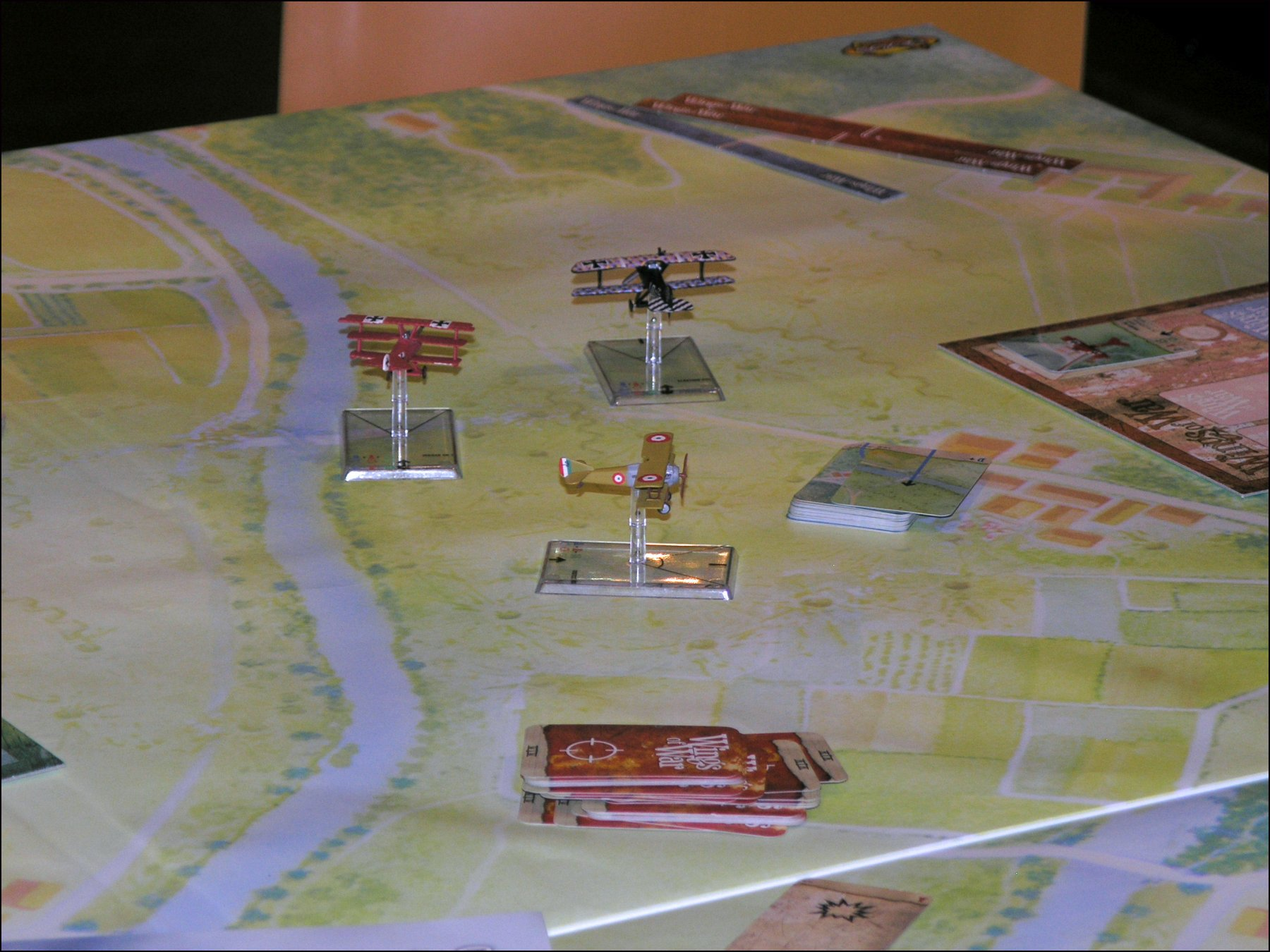
Wings of War, which simulates World War 1 aerial combat

Air wargaming, like naval wargaming, is a smaller niche within the larger hobby of miniatures wargaming. Aerial combat has developed over a relatively short time compared with naval or land warfare. As such, air wargaming tends to break down into three broad periods:

- World War I – from the earliest days of air combat to the 1920s
- World War II – 1930s to the early 1950s
- "Modern" – the missile age

In addition there are science fiction and "alternative history" games such as Aeronefs and those in the Crimson Skies universe.

== History ==
=== Precursors ===
Wargaming was invented in Prussia near the end of the 18th century. The earliest wargames were based on chess; the pieces represented real military units (artillery, cavalry, etc.) and squares on the board were color-coded to represent different terrain types. Later wargames used realistic maps over which troop pieces could move in a free-form manner, and instead of chess-like sculpted pieces they used little rectangular blocks because they were played at smaller scales (e.g. 1:8000). The Prussian army formally adopted wargaming as a training tool in 1824. After Prussia defeated France in the Franco-Prussian War of 1870, wargaming spread around the world and was played enthusiastically by both officers and civilians.

=== Birth ===
In 1881, the Scottish writer Robert Louis Stevenson became the first documented person to use toy soldiers in a wargame, and thus he might be the inventor of miniature wargaming, although he never published his rules. According to an account by his stepson, they were very sophisticated and realistic, on par with German military wargames. Stevenson played his wargame on the floor, on a map drawn with chalk.

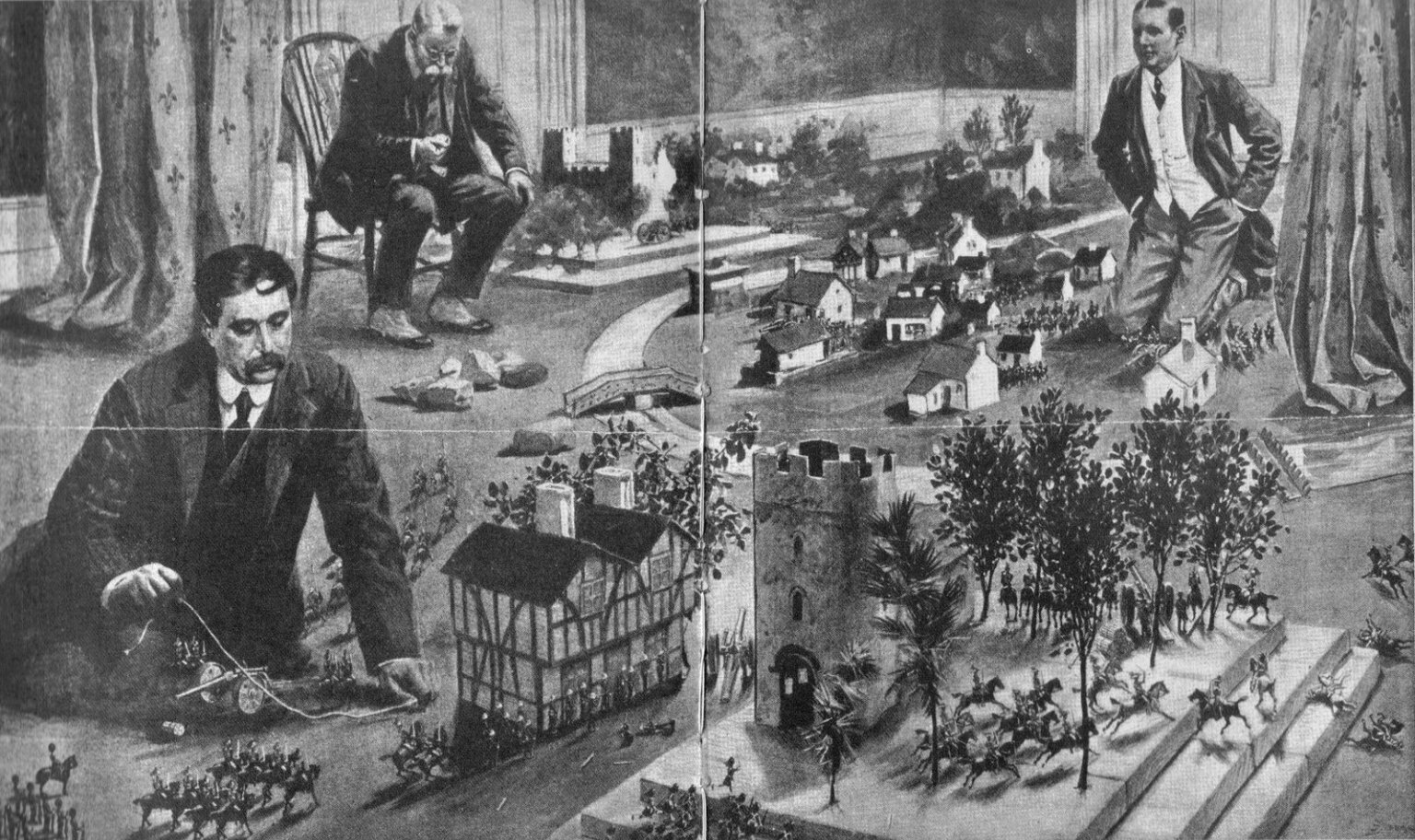
H. G. Wells and his friends playing Little Wars

The English writer H. G. Wells developed his own codified rules for playing with toy soldiers, which he published in a book titled Little Wars (1913). This is widely remembered as the first rulebook for miniature wargaming. Little Wars had very simple rules to make it fun and accessible to anyone. Little Wars did not use dice or computation to resolve fights. For artillery attacks, players used spring-loaded toy cannons which fired little wooden cylinders to physically knock over enemy models. As for infantry and cavalry, they could only engage in hand-to-hand combat (even if the figurines exhibited firearms). When two infantry units fought in close quarters, the units would suffer non-random losses determined by their relative sizes. Little Wars was designed for a large field of play, such as a lawn or the floor of a large room, because the toy soldiers available to Wells were too large for tabletop play. An infantryman could move up to one foot per turn, and a cavalryman could move up to two feet per turn. To measure these distances, players used a two-foot long piece of string. Wells was also the first wargamer to use models of buildings, trees, and other terrain features to create a three-dimensional battlefield.

Wells' rulebook was for a long time regarded as the standard system by which other miniature wargames were judged. However, the nascent miniature wargaming community would remain very small for a long time to come. A possible reason was the two World Wars, which de-glamorized war and caused shortages of tin and lead that made model soldiers expensive. Another reason may have been the lack of magazines or clubs dedicated to miniature wargames. Miniature wargaming was seen as a niche within the larger hobby of making and collecting model soldiers.

=== Post-War growth ===
In 1955, an American named Jack Scruby began making inexpensive miniature models for miniature wargames out of type metal. Scruby's major contribution to the miniature wargaming hobby was to network players across America and the UK. At the time, the miniature wargaming community was minuscule, and players struggled to find each other. In 1956, Scruby organized the first miniature wargaming convention in America, which was attended by just fourteen people. From 1957 to 1962, he self-published the world's first miniature wargaming magazine, titled The War Game Digest, through which wargamers could publish their rules and share game reports. It had less than two hundred subscribers, but it did establish a community that kept growing.

Around the same time in the United Kingdom, Donald Featherstone began writing an influential series of books on wargaming, which represented the first mainstream published contribution to wargaming since Little Wars. Titles included : War Games (1962), Advanced Wargames, Solo Wargaming, Wargame Campaigns, Battles with Model Tanks, Skirmish Wargaming. Such was the popularity of such titles that other authors were able to have published wargaming titles. This output of published wargaming titles from British authors coupled with the emergence at the same time of several manufacturers providing suitable wargame miniatures (e.g. Miniature Figurines, Hinchliffe, Peter Laing, Garrison, Airfix, Skytrex, Davco, Heroic & Ros) was responsible for the huge upsurge of popularity of the hobby in the late 1960s and into the 1970s.

In 1956, Tony Bath published what was the first ruleset for a miniature wargame set in the medieval period. In 1971, Gary Gygax developed his own miniature wargame system for medieval warfare called Chainmail. Gygax later produced a supplement for Chainmail that added magic and fantasy creatures, making this the first fantasy miniature wargame. This supplement was inspired by the growing popularity of The Lord of the Rings novels by J. R. R. Tolkien.

Gygax later went on to develop the first tabletop role-playing game: Dungeons & Dragons. Dungeons & Dragons was a story-driven game, but adapted wargaming rules to model the fights players could get in. Battles in Dungeons and Dragons rarely featured more than a dozen combatants, so the combat rules were designed to model the capabilities of the warriors in very great detail. Strictly speaking, Dungeons & Dragons did not require miniature models to play, but many players found that using miniature models made the fights easier to arbitrate and more immersive.

=== Commercial wargames with proprietary models ===
In 1983, a British company called Games Workshop released a fantasy miniature wargame called Warhammer, (Note: It was originally titled Warhammer Fantasy Battle, then shortened to simply Warhammer in subsequent editions, and often referred to as Warhammer Fantasy to better distinguish it from Warhammer 40,000. It was supplanted by Warhammer Age of Sigmar, which is officially a new product line but uses the same setting as Warhammer Fantasy.) which was the first miniature wargame designed to use proprietary models. Games Workshop at the time made miniature models for use in Dungeons & Dragons. Warhammer was meant to encourage customers to buy more of these models. Whereas miniature models were optional in Dungeons & Dragons, Warhammer mandated their use and the battles tended to be larger. Initially, Warhammer had a threadbare fictional setting and used generic stock characters common to fantasy fiction, but as time went on, Games Workshop expanded the setting with original characters with distinctive visual designs. Games Workshop's official line of models for Warhammer eventually took on such a distinctive look that rival manufacturers could not produce similar-looking models without risking a lawsuit over copyright infringement. Although there was nothing to stop players of Warhammer from using foreign models from third-party manufacturers, doing so could spoil the aesthetic and cause confusion.

In 1987, Games Workshop released a science-fiction spinoff of Warhammer called Warhammer 40,000. Like Warhammer, Warhammer 40,000 obliged players to buy proprietary models from Games Workshop. Warhammer 40,000 became even more successful than Warhammer. The success of the Warhammer games promoted the sales of Games Workshop's line of gaming models.

Other game companies sought to emulate Games Workshop's business model. Examples include Mantic Games, Fantasy Flight Games, Privateer Press, and Warlord Games, all of which have released their own miniature wargame systems that were designed to promote sales of their respective lines of proprietary gaming models. This business model has proven lucrative, and thanks to the marketing resources of these companies, sci-fi / fantasy wargames have displaced historical wargames in popularity.

== Community and culture ==
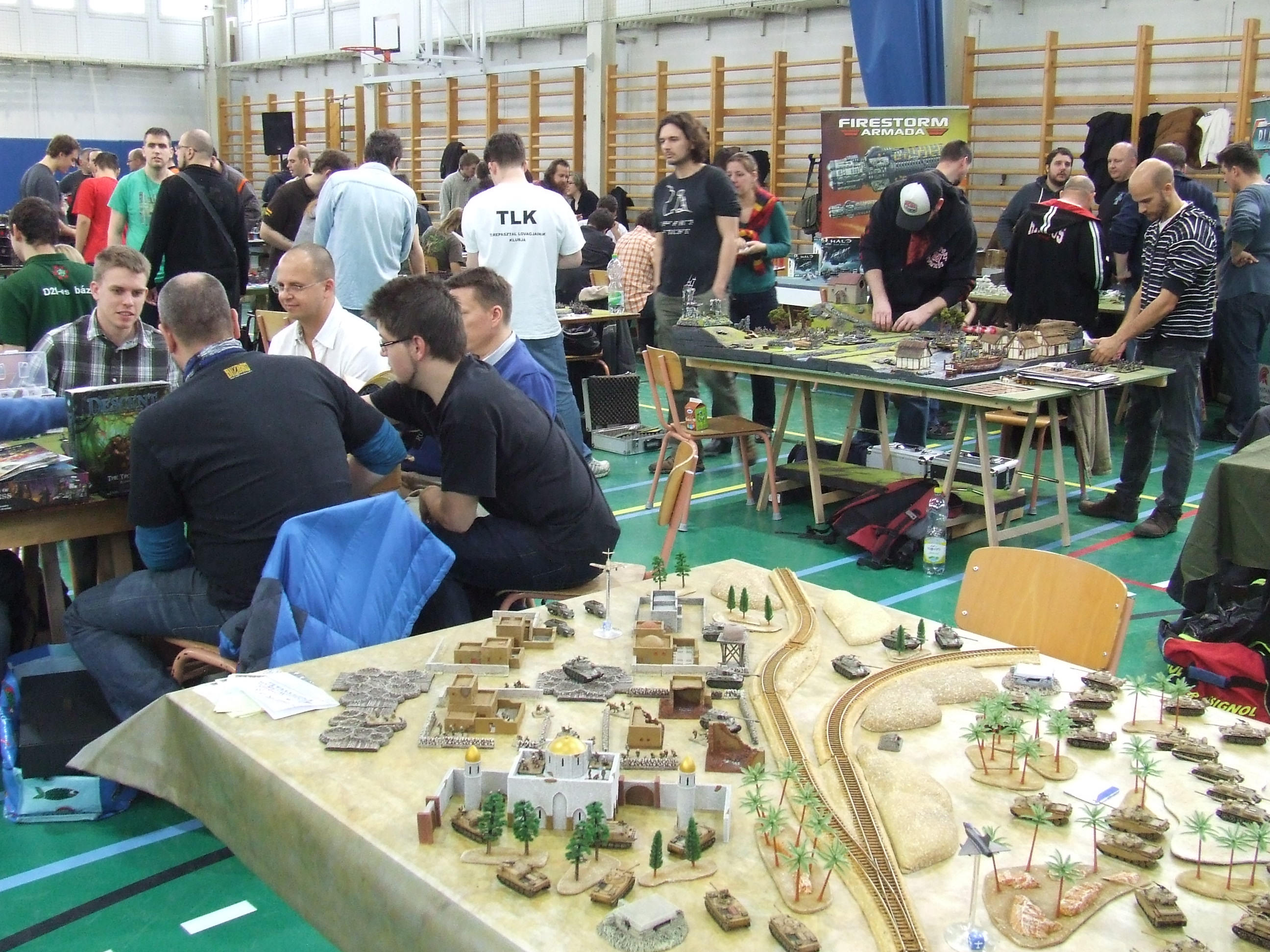
A miniature wargaming convention (Games Day Budapest 2015)

Players of miniature wargames tend to be more extroverted than players of board wargames and computer wargames. Players of miniature wargames are obliged to meet in person and play in the same room around a table, whereas board wargames can be played via correspondence and computer wargames can be played online; therefore miniature wargaming places a premium on sociability. (This has changed somewhat with the onset of the COVID-19 pandemic. Wargamers (miniature and board) have become quite creative in devising ways to play games while maintaining social distancing.)

Consequently, conventions and clubs are important to the wargaming community. Some conventions have become very large affairs, such as Gen-Con, Origins and Historical Miniatures Gaming Society's Historicon, called the "mother of all wargaming conventions". Players also tend to be middle-aged or older. One reason is that the hobby is expensive and needs higher disposable income that older people tend to have.

=== Organizations ===
- International Wargames Federation (IWF) promotes historical wargaming competitions between players or teams from different countries.
- Johnny Reb Gaming Society – the leading international gaming society devoted exclusively to wargaming the American Civil War; publishes the quarterly CHARGE! newsletter for members of the society.
- Wargame Developments (WD) was founded by game designer and author Paddy Griffith in 1980, and is an international group dedicated to developing all types of wargames. It publishes a journal, The Nugget, nine times per year and holds a 3-day long conference, COW (The Conference of Wargamers), every July.
- Historical Miniatures Gaming Society (HMGS) - HMGS, Inc. is a non-profit, charitable and educational 501(c)3 organization whose purpose is to promote the study of military history through the art of tabletop miniature wargaming. HMGS holds several of the largest wargaming conventions in the United States annually.
- Mind Sports South Africa started as the South African Wargames Union in 1984. It was the first wargaming body to have wargames recognized as a sport in the same way as which chess is so recognized. As a result, South African teams were awarded Springbok Colours (1991–1994) and Protea Colours (1995 to date).
- The Solo Wargamers Association (SWA) founded in 1976 supports solo players in all branches of wargaming – historical, science fiction, fantasy, miniatures, board games etc. Publishes a quarterly journal Lone Warrior.
- The British Historical Games Society (BHGS) promotes historical wargaming in Britain, holding events including tournaments periodically.
- The War Gaming Society (WGS) was founded in May 1975. The Joaquin Valley War Gaming Association (SJVWGA), founded in 1972 by Jack Scruby, Ray Jackson and other miniature wargamers, is a subdivision of the War Gaming Society.
- The Society of Ancients, founded in the 1960s, promoting ancient wargaming and historical research through Slingshot, the society journal.
- Warhammer Player's Society. Dedicated to all versions (Fantasy, Ancients and Science-Fiction) of Warhammer
- Society of Twentieth Century Wargamers. (SOTCW) covers all periods from 1900 to present [land, sea or air] the society has a magazine, The Journal, which is produced quarterly.
- Society of Fantasy and Science Fiction Wargamers (SFSFW). For fantastical and future, including retro-future, wargames. Publishers of Ragnarok magazine.
- Naval Wargames Society. The NWS is an international society devoted to the advancement of naval wargames, publishing a quarterly journal, Battlefleet.

=== Wargamers and designers ===
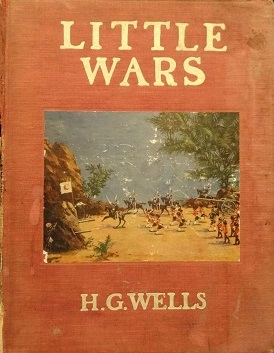
Little Wars, by H. G. Wells (1913)

- H. G. Wells – Known as the "Father of Miniature Wargaming" and author of the miniature wargaming classic Little Wars.
- Jack Scruby – The "Father of Modern Miniature Wargaming". Popularized modern miniature wargaming and organized perhaps the first miniatures convention in 1956. Jack Scruby was also a manufacturer of military miniatures whose efforts led to a rebirth of the miniature wargaming hobby in the late 1950s.
- Gary Gygax – Co-creator of Dungeons & Dragons and a number of miniature wargames.
- Dave Arneson – Co-creator of Dungeons & Dragons
- MAR Barker -Creator of Tékumel: Empire of the Petal Throne, professor, linguist, and author.
- Peter Cushing -Actor, and star of films.
- Duke Seifried – Sculptor of over 10,000 miniatures, one of the earliest American miniature manufacturers: Heritage, Custom Cast, Der Kreigspielers Napoleonic, and Fantastiques Fantasy Figures.
- Bruce Rea Taylor - Designer of the Firefly, Challenger, Corps Commander and Korps Commander rules.
- Charles Grant – Author and founder member of the UK wargaming scene in the 1960s. Helped popularize miniature wargaming.
- Donald Featherstone – A respected military historian, introduced to the hobby in 1955. Since then, he was one of the most prolific authors on the subject, and very influential in the development of the hobby.
- Fletcher Pratt – Science fiction writer (often in collaboration with L. Sprague de Camp) and originator of a popular set of rules for naval miniature wargaming.
- Walter ("Wally") Simon – One of the original founders of the Historical Miniature Gaming Society. First President of HMGS and Organizer of the Potomac Wargamers, publisher of the PW Review.
- David Waxtel – Publisher of over 20 sets of rules, and supplement books.
- George Gush – Noted for A Guide to Wargaming (1980) as well as the WRG Renaissance Rules
- John Hill – Known for his classic Squad Leader and other Avalon Hill board games, also the author of the popular Johnny Reb miniatures rules.
- Frank Chadwick – Author of the Command Decision and Volley & Bayonet rules, Space: 1889 and Traveller, and co-founder of Game Designers' Workshop.
- Richard Clarke - Founder of TooFatLardies and Reisswitz Press. Author of thirteen award winning rule sets including Chain of Command and Sharp Practice. Publisher of over 30 rule sets and long-serving wargames magazine columnist. Awarded the HMGS Legion of Honor for service to the wargaming hobby.
- Gene McCoy – Founder of the Wargamers Digest magazine and creator of the Wargamers Digest WW2 Rules game framework.
- Phil Barker – Founder of the Wargames Research Group, and inventor of the De Bellis Antiquitatis game series.
- Arty Conliffe – Designer of Armati, Crossfire, Spearhead, Shako and Tactica rules.
- Bob Jones – Founder of Piquet and designer of the Piquet wargame series.
- Phil Dunn – Founder of the Naval Wargames Society and author of Sea Battle Games.
- Tony Bath – Author and veteran wargamer, founding member of the Society of Ancients, best known as umpire of one of the longest running and well known of all wargames campaigns, set in the fictional land of Hyboria.
- David Manley – Author of many sets of naval rules including Action Stations, Fire When Ready, Iron and Fire, Bulldogs Away, and Form Line of Battle, as well as numerous articles and technical papers on naval wargaming, history, and warship design.
- Scott Mingus – founder of the international Johnny Reb Gaming Society and one of the world's most prolific authors of American Civil War scenario books.
- Neville Dickinson – One of the original members of the UK wargaming scene and founder of Miniature Figurines, the first firm in the UK to popularize metal miniatures.
- Larry Brom - designer of The Sword and The Flame, one of the most popular colonial era wargames.
- Andy Chambers – Known for his work in rules design and revision for Games Workshop Inc. and Mongoose Publishing. Notable games he helped develop include Warhammer 40,000 and Starship Troopers: The Miniatures Game.
- Bryan Ansell - Creator of Laserburn, Rules with No Name, co-creator/co-author of Warhammer, author Warhammer 40,000 and a host of other game credits. Associated primarily with Games Workshop and Citadel Miniatures, also Asgard Miniatures
- Rick Priestley – co-creator/co-author of Warhammer, author of Warhammer 40,000 and a host of other game credits. Associated primarily with Games Workshop and Citadel but earlier work included co-authoring the seminal fantasy wargame rulebook Reaper.
- Paddy Griffith - Military historian and founder of Wargame Developments, he devised and ran the first Megagames as well as many experimental wargames that were designed to give military historians a greater insight into how battles and campaigns were actually fought. Many of his wargames posed ethical and moral dilemmas for the players and challenged orthodox thinking.
- Alessio Cavatore - Writer of many popular rulesets. Famous for his work with Games Workshop, Mantic and Warlord.
- Lorenzo Giusti - One of the most popular Fantasy Football sculptors with over 800 figures and models for these kind of games, founder and owner of Greebo Games
- Andy Callan - has produced many sets of wargame rules over a span of several decades, including Never Mind the Billhooks published by Wargames Illustrated magazine.

== See also ==
- Simulation game
- Nation-simulation game
- Grand strategy
- Fantasy wargame
- Tabletop game
  - List of miniature wargames
  - List of wargame publishers
  - Scale model
- Computer and video games
- Computer-assisted gaming
- Card game
- Dice game

== Sources ==
- Harrigan, Pat; Kirschenbaum, Matthew G., eds. (2016). Zones of Control: Perspectives on Wargaming. MIT Press. ISBN 9780262033992.
- Priestley, Rick; Lambshead, John (2016). Tabletop Wargames: A Designers' and Writers' Handbook. Pen & Sword Books Limited. ISBN 9781783831487.
