= List of miniature wargames =

Miniature wargames are a form of wargaming designed to incorporate miniatures or figurines into play, which was invented at the beginning of the 19th century in Prussia. The miniatures used represent troops or vehicles (such as tanks, chariots, aircraft, ships, etc.). The games may reflect historical situations and armies, or may be futuristic or fantasy-based.

This list compiles published miniature wargames categorized by their subject matter, genre, or time period covered in their rules. Where known, the publisher is given (or, in a few cases, the designer(s) in the case of self-published or freely distributed games), as well as the date of first publication (many games have been published in several updated editions).

== Ancients ==
- A Fistfull of Miniatures (North Shore Press, 1986; Precis Intermedia Gaming, 2009)
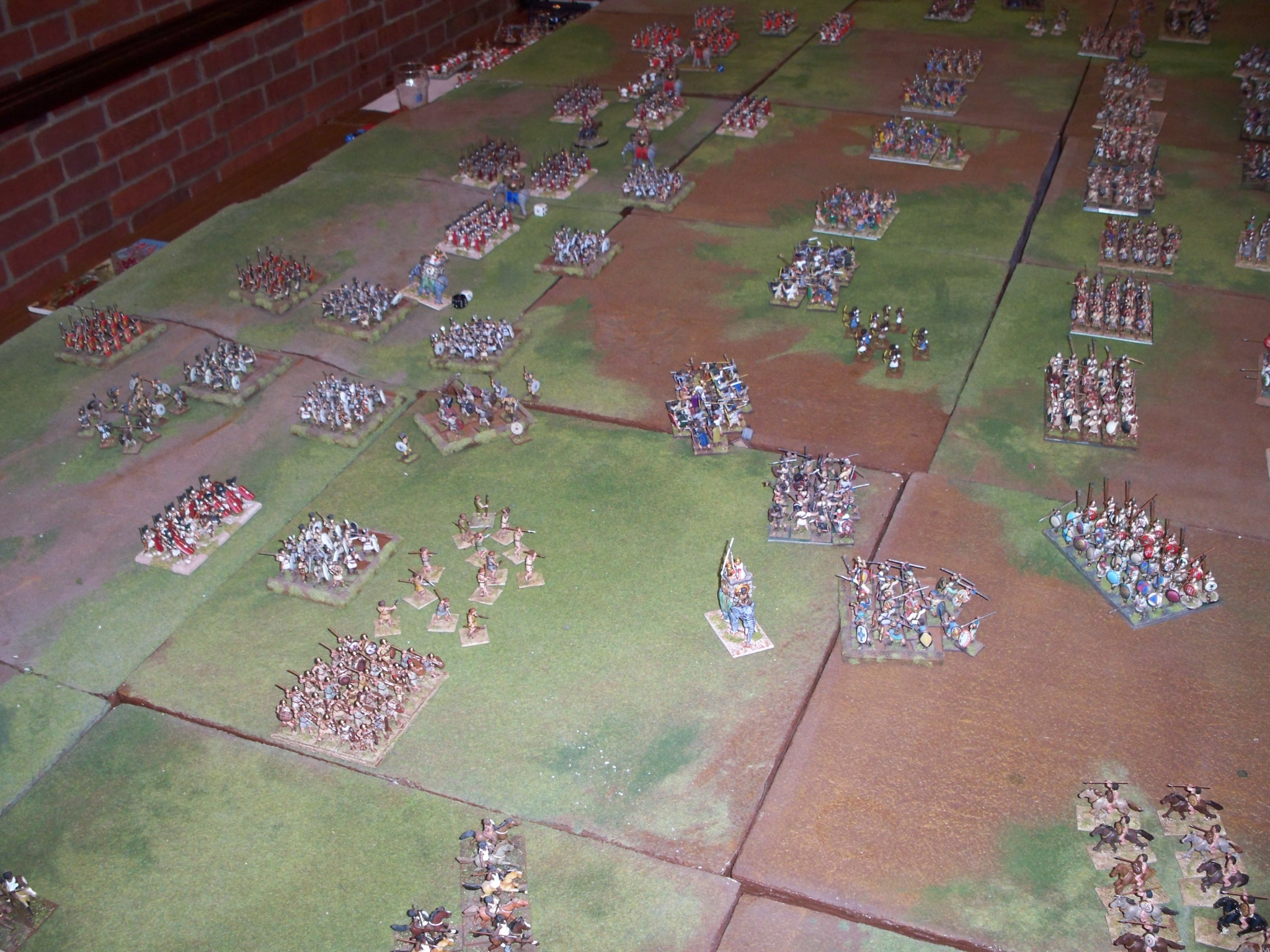
  A game in play using the Warhammer Ancient Battles ruleset.
- Age of Battles (Zvezda, 2007)
- Age of Hannibal (Little Wars TV, 2018)
- Age of Heroes - Biblical Era V 6 (Computer Moderated Miniature Wargame Rules) (Computer Strategies, 2007)
- Ancient & Medieval Wargaming (Sutton Publishing, 2007)
- Ancient Empires (The Emperor's Press, 1991)
- Ancient Warfare (Milgamex, 1975, designed and written by Arnold Hendrick)
- Ancient Warfare (A to Z Rules, 1997)
- Ancient Warfare (Saga Publishing, 1998)
- Arcane Warfare (Jerboa Development Team, 2002)
- Armati (Quantum Printing, 1994)
- Basic Impetus (Dadi & Piombo, 2006)
- Battlestandard Ancient Rules (Battlestandard Miniatures and Games, 2004)
- Clash of Empires (Great Escape Games, 2011)
- Classical Hack (LMW Works Publications, 2002)
- Classic Warfare (Tactical Studies Rules, 1975)
- Conquerors and Kings (Peter Pig, 1999)
- Crusader (Crusader Miniatures, 2007)
- De Bellis Antiquitatis (Wargames Research Group, 1990)
- De Bellis Magistrorum Militum (Caliver Books, 2007)
- De Bellis Multitudinis (Wargames Research Group, 1993)
- Fast Play Rules for Ancient Warfare (Newbury Rules, 1985)
- Field of Glory (Osprey Publishing, 2008)
- Gordian Knot (Agema Publications, 2007)
- Greek Naval Warfare (London Wargames Section, 1972)
- Hail Caesar (Warlord Games, 2011)
- Hex Command Ancients (Imagine Image Multimedia, 2000)
- Holy Hack First Edition (LMW Works, 1996)
- Holy Hack Second Edition (LMW Works, 2007)

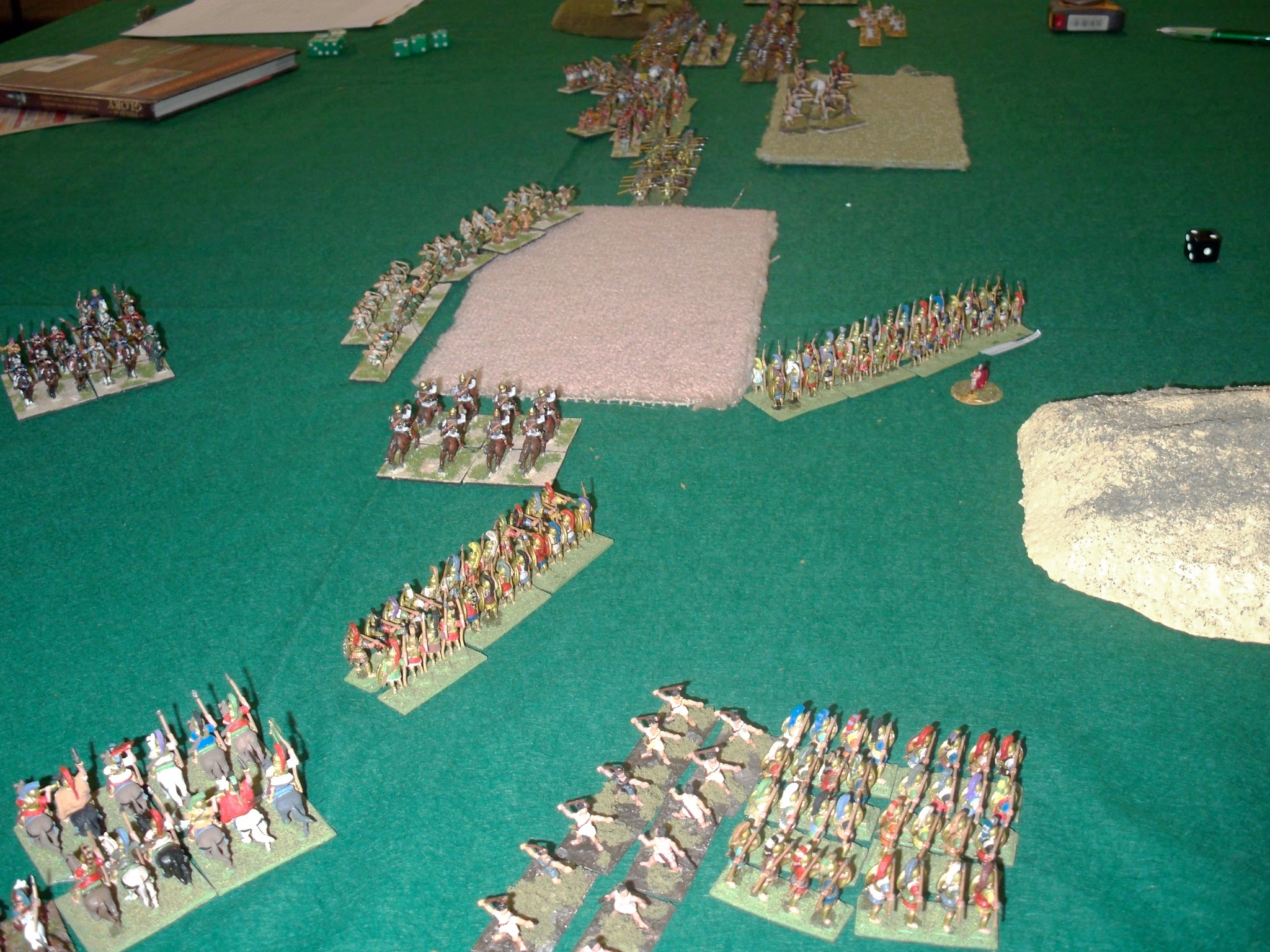
A game in play using the Field of Glory ruleset

- Homeric Hack (LMW Works, 2004)
- Hoplon (Nicolas A. Protonotarios, 2003)
- Impetus (Dadi & Piombo, 2008)
- In Death Ground (Ruga-Ruga Publications, 2010)
- Infamy, Infamy! (Too Fat Lardies, 2020)
- Justified Ancients (Amazon Miniatures, 2005)
- King David (Signifer Club Vicenza, 2004)
- L'Art de la Guerre (Onyx éditions, 2008)
- Legion (Fantasy Games Unlimited, 1976)
- Lost Battles (Philip Sabin, 2008)
- Macedon and Rome V 6 (Computer Moderated Miniature Wargame Rules) (Computer Strategies, 2007)
- Melees Gloriosus (David P. Gundt, 1999)
- Might of Arms (Colonnade Publishing, 1996)
- Mortem et Gloriam (SHALL Enterprises Ltd, 2016)
- Peltast and Pila (Tony Bath, Tabletop Warfare Limited, 1976)
- PMG Ancients (Jeff Hunt, Portsmouth Miniatures and Games, 1997)
- Salamis Ad Actium (David Manley, 2005)
- Shieldbearer (Michel J Young)
- Swordpoint (Gripping Beast, 2016)
- Tactica (Quantum Printing, 1989)
- The Art of War (Doug Larsen & Rocky Russo, 2005)
- The Shock of Impact (Tabletop Games, 1981)
- To the Strongest! (BigRedBat Ventures, 2014)
- Vis Bellica (Ordered Flexibility, 2002)
- War & Conquest (Scarab Miniatures, 2011)
- Warfare in the Ancient World (Newbury Rules, 1980)
- War Games Rules 1000 B.C to 500 A.D (Ancient War Games Research Group, 1969)
- War Games Rules 1000 B.C. to 1000 A.D. (War Games Research Group, 1971)
- War Games Rules 3000 B.C - 1250 A.D (Wargames Research Group, 1976)
- War Games Rules 3000 BC to 1485 AD (Wargames Research Group, 1980)
- Wargames Rules - Ancient Period (480 B.C. - A.D. 61) (Athena, 1986)
- Warhammer Ancient Battles (Warhammer Historical Wargames, 1998)
- Warlord (Partizan Press, 2007)
- Warmaster Ancients (Warhammer Historical Wargames, 2005)
- Warrior (Four Horsemen Enterprises, 2002)
- Warrior Kings (Two Hour Wargames, 1998)
- Wars Ancient (Magni Games, 2010)

== Early Middle Ages ==
- A Fistfull of Miniatures (North Shore Press, 1986; Precis Intermedia Gaming, 2009)
- Ancient & Medieval Wargaming (Sutton Publishing, 2007)
- Ancient Warfare (A to Z Rules, 1997)
- Arcane Warfare (Jerboa Development Team, 2002)
- Armati (Quantum Printing, 1994)
- L'Art de la Guerre (Onyx éditions, 2008)
- The Art of War (Doug Larsen & Rocky Russo, 2005)
- Basic Impetus (Dadi & Piombo, 2006)
- Battlelust (Columbia Games, 1992)
- Battlestandard Ancient Rules (Battlestandard Miniatures and Games, 2004)
- Clash of Empires (Great Escape Games, 2011)
- Comitatus (Simon MacDowall, 2011)
- Conquerors and Kings (Peter Pig, 1999)
- De Bellis Antiquitatis (Wargames Research Group, 1990)
- De Bellis Magistrorum Militum (Caliver Books, 2007)
- De Bellis Multitudinis (Wargames Research Group, 1993)
- Dux Brittaniarum (Too Fat Lardies, 2012)
- Field of Glory (Osprey Publishing, 2008)
- Hack In the Dark (Philip Viverito/LMW Works LLC 2008)
- Hail Caesar (Warlord Games, 2011)
- Hoplon (Nicolas A. Protonotarios, 2003)
- Impetus (Dadi & Piombo, 2008)
- Might of Arms (Colonnade Publishing, 1996)
- Mortem et Gloriam (SHALL Enterprises Ltd, 2016)
- Saga Dark Ages (Studio Tomahawk, published through Gripping Beast)
- The Shock of Impact (Tabletop Games, 1981)
- Swordpoint (Gripping Beast, 2016)
- To Me! V 6:Computer Moderated Miniature Wargames Rules (Computer Strategies, 2007)
- To the Strongest! (Simon Miller)
- War & Conquest (Scarab Miniatures, 2011)
- War Games Rules 1000 B.C. to 1000 A.D. (War Games Research Group, 1971)
- War Games Rules 3000 B.C - 1250 A.D (Wargames Research Group, 1976)
- War Games Rules 3000 BC to 1485 AD (Wargames Research Group, 1980)
- Warhammer Ancient Battles (Warhammer Historical Wargames, 1998)
- Warlord (Partizan Press, 2007)
- Warmaster Ancients (Warhammer Historical Wargames, 2005)
- Warrior (Four Horsemen Enterprises, 2002)
- Warrior Kings (Two Hour Wargames, 1998)

== Middle Ages ==
- A Fistfull of Miniatures (North Shore Press, 1986; Precis Intermedia Gaming, 2009)
- Ancient & Medieval Wargaming (Sutton Publishing, 2007)
- Arcane Warfare (Jerboa Development Team, 2002)
- Armati (Arty Conliffe, 1994) followed by Armati II (Arty Conliffe, 2004)
- L'Art de la Guerre (Onyx éditions, 2008)
- The Art of War (Doug Larsen & Rocky Russo, 2005)
- Basic Impetus (Dadi & Piombo, 2006)
- Battlestandard Ancient Rules (Battlestandard Miniatures and Games, 2004)
- Chainmail (Guidon Games, 1971)
- Clash of Empires (Great Escape Games, 2011)
- Crusader (Crusader Miniatures, 2007)
- De Bellis Antiquitatis (Wargames Research Group, 1990)
- De Bellis Magistrorum Militum (Caliver Books, 2007)
- De Bellis Multitudinis (Wargames Research Group, 1993)
- Ex illis (Chinchilla Games, 2013)
- Field of Glory (Osprey Publishing, 2008)
- HAVOC: Tactical Miniature Warfare (Brent Spivey, Voodoo Ink Publishing, 2009)
- Impetus (Dadi & Piombo, 2008)
- Knight Hack (LMW Works, 2007)
- Medieval Campaign and Battle Rules (One-to-One), 2nd Edition (Compiled and Published by W.H. Lamming and T.H. Houtlby, copyright 1976)
- Might of Arms (Colonnade Publishing, 1996)
- Mortem et Gloriam (SHALL Enterprises Ltd, 2016)
- Retinue Medieval Skirmish Rules (David Cliff, Tabletop Games, 1978)
- Shattered Lances (Outpost Wargame Services, 2005)
- Swordpoint (Gripping Beast, 2016)
- Tactica Medieval (Quantum Printing, 1992)
- To Me! V 6:Computer Moderated Miniature Wargames Rules (Computer Strategies, 2007)
- To the Strongest! (Simon Miller)
- WarChu (www.warchu.com, 2011)
- War Games Rules 3000 B.C - 1250 A.D (Wargames Research Group, 1976)
- War Games Rules 3000 BC to 1485 AD (Wargames Research Group, 1980)
- Warhammer Ancient Battles (Warhammer Historical Wargames, 1998)
- Warheads: Medieval Tales (Urban Mammoth, 2010)
- Warlord II (Partizan Press, 2008)
- Warmaster Ancients (Warhammer Historical Wargames, 2005)
- Warrior (Four Horsemen Enterprises, 2002)
- Warrior Kings (Two Hour Wargames, 1998)

== Renaissance ==
- Basic Impetus (Dadi & Piombo, 2006)
- De Bellis Renationis (Wargames Research Group, 1997)
- Field of Glory: Renaissance (Osprey Publishing, 2010)
- Flashing Steel (Ganesha Games, 2010)
- Forged in Blood (Ganesha Games, 2018)
- Impetus (Dadi & Piombo, 2008)
- Pike & Shotte (Steve Morgan, Warlord Games, 2012)
- Rulettes for 16th Century Naval Warfare (Wargames Research Group, 1978)
- Samurai Warfare (Adams & Clarke, ~1979)
- Sword And Pistol (Tabletop Games, 1985)
- The Road To Osaka (Daisho Publications, 1995)
- The Universal Soldier (RAFM Company, 1977)
- Wargames Rules - Sixteenth and Early Seventeenth Century (1490–1660) (George Gush, Wargames Research Group, 1976)
- Wargames Rules For Fifteenth to Seventeenth Centuries (1420–1700) (George Gush, Wargames Research Group, 1979)
- Warlord II (Partizan Press, 2008)

== Early Modern ==
- 1644 (Rick Priestley, Wargames Foundry, 1990)
- Age of Musket (Peter Morffew, 2003)
- Bayonet and Ideology (Peter Pig, 1994)
- Before I was a Marshal, I was a Grenadier (Sergeants 3, 1967/2001)
- Black Powder (Rick Priestley, Warlord Games, 2009)
- Black Powder Battles (Two Hour Wargames, 2004)
- Blenheim To Balaclava (Brian Gregory, Brigade Games, 1988)
- Blood & Plunder (Michael Tuñezm, Firelock Games, 2016)
- Blood, Bilge, and Iron Balls (Age of Sail, Alan Abbey, Pen & Sword, 2011)
- Carnage & Glory (Nigel P. Marsh, 1991)
- Carnage & Glory II (Nigel P. Marsh, 2001)
- Cavaliers and Roundheads (TSR, Inc., 1973)
- Classic Napoleonics (Raymond [Ray] James Jackson, 1971)
- Close Action (Clash of Arms Games, 1998)
- Column, Line, & Square (Fred Vietmeyer, 1966)
- Corps d'Armee: Napoleonic Rules for Large Scale Wargames (Geoffrey Wootten, Wargames Research Group, 1989)
- De Bellis Renationis (Wargames Research Group, 1997)
- Divisional Commander (Studio Capitan)
- Don't Give Up The Ship! (Tactical Studies Rules, 1972)'t Give Up The Ship!Tactical Studies Rules

Don't Give Up The Ship! Rulebook (1975).

- Dutchman Spaniard Switzer Swede (Douglas Hubbard, Tactical Realities Inc., 1993
- Eagles, Swords & Bayonets(Richard Kohlbacker/LMW Works 2014 LMW Works: publishing tabletop wargame rules sets, historical non-fiction, spiritual texts, & retail catalogs since 1998))
- Empire (Napoleonic) (Scotty Bowden, 197 no5)
- Empires, Eagles, and Lions (Napoleonic Era) (New Jersey Association of Wargamers, 1980)
- Ever Victorious Armies (Honourable Lead Boiler Suit Company, 2000)
- Field of Glory: Napoleonic (Osprey Publishing, 2012)
- Final Argument of Kings (Seven Years' War) (Dean West, 1996)
- File Leader! (English Civil War) (Peter Berry, Partizan Press, 1987)
- Forlorn Hope (English Civil War) (Peter Berry & Ben Wilkins, Partizan Press, 1987)
- Form Line of Battle (David Manley, 2000)
- Frappé (Napoleonic) (Ray Johnson and Duke Seifried, The Wargamers' Library, Volume 1, c1970)
- From Valmy to Waterloo (Tactical to Grand Tactical, 1792–1815) (William Keyser, Clash of Arms Games, 1995)
- Game of War Napoleonic and 18th century (Agema.org.uk, 2007)
- Grand Battles Napoleon (Napoleonic) (Siege Works Studios, 2014)
- Grande Armée (Napoleonic) (Sam A. Mustafa, 2002)
- Grand Manoeuvre (Napoleonic) (Michael Collins, 2011)
- Great Captains - Linear Warfare V 6 (Computer Moderated Miniature Wargame Rules) (Computer Strategies, 2007)
- Gunpowder Revolution - Renaissance Warfare V 6 (Computer Moderated Miniature Wargame Rules) (Computer Strategies, 2007)
- Guns of Liberty (American War of Independence) (Eric Burgess, 1998)
- Gå På (Great Northern War, War of the Spanish Succession) (Thomas Årnfelt)
- Habitants and Highlanders (French and Indian War) (Canadian Wargamers Group, 1992)
- Honours of War (Seven Years' War) (Osprey Publishing, 2015)
- Imperial Lances (Napoleonic Wars) (The Tin Dictator | Bob Rodgers, 2009)
- In the Heart of Africa (Colonial Africa 1860–1899) (Honourable Lead Boiler Suit Co., unknown)
- In the Name of Glory (David Marks, 2005)
- Iron Duke - Napoleonics V 6 (Computer Moderated Miniature Wargame Rules) (Computer Strategies, 2007)
- It is Warm Work- Age of Sail Naval (Frank Capotorto, 2011)
- John Company (Colonial India) (n/a, unknown)
- King of the Battlefield (18th-century European) (Ian Godwin, unknown)
- King's War (Pike & Shot Era) (Bruce Bretthauer, 2004)
- Kiss Me Hardy (Napoleonic Naval) (Too Fat Lardies, 2003)
- Koenig Krieg (1740–1786), War of Austrian Succession, Seven Years' War, American War of Independence) (Siege Works Studios, 2009)
- La Grande Armée (Napoleonic) (Simulations Publications Inc, 1972)
- La Grande Armée (Napoleonic) (TSR, Inc., 1987)
- Lasalle (Napoleonic) (Honour - Sam Mustafa, 2009)
- Le Feu Sacré (Napoleonic) (Too Fat Lardies, 2004)
- Le Petite Armee v4.1 (Napoleonic) (Signifer/LPA Games, 2001)
- Marlburian Commander (Studio Capitan)
- Matchlock; ECW Rules for 1/300th scale (Mike Smith, Partizan Press, 1988)
- Might & Reason (18th-century European)
- Napoleon's Campaigns in Miniature, A wargamers' guide to the Napoleonic Wars 1796-1815 (3rd Impression, 1986, Patrick Stephens, Text copyright Bruce Quarrie 1977)
- Napoleonic Wargaming, Airfix Magazine Guide 4 (Patrick Stephens Ltd and Airfix Products, Ltd, 1974) (Bruce Quarrie)
- Napoleonic Wargaming (Model and Allied Publications, Argus Books, Ltd, 1974) (Charles Grant)
- Napoleonique (Napoleonic Era) (Jim Getz, Duke Seifried, The Wargamers' Library Vol IV, 1971)
- Napoleonique Encore (Napoleonic Era) (Glenn Davis, Jim Getz, Duke Seifried, 1992)
- Napoleon's Battles (1989 Avalon Hill; Lost Battalion Games 2009)(Robert Coggins and Craig Taylor)
- Pas de Charge! (Napoleonic Era) (George Nafziger, Z & M Enterprises, 1977)
- Patrols in the Sudan (19th century colonial) (Peter Pig, 2004)
- Pike Hack Road to Dunbar (Philip Viverito/LMW Works LLC 2013 LMW Works: publishing tabletop wargame rules sets, historical non-fiction, spiritual texts, & retail catalogs since 1998)
- Piquet (Multiple periods)
- Pirates & Buccaneers (16th-18th century skirmish) (Tactical Command Games, 1988)
- Pirates of the Spanish Main (WizKids, 2004)
- Principles of War (16th century to WWI)
- Rank and File (Horse and Musket 1740–1900) (Crusader Publishing)
- Regiment of Foote (English Civil War) (Peter Pig, 2004)
- Republique (Napoleonic)
- Rocket's Red Glare (War of 1812) (Canadian Wargamers Group, 1994)
- Rough Riders (SCW)
- Rebels and Patriots
- Senso (Samurai)
- Shako I & II (Napoleonics) (Arty Conliffe)
- Spanish Fury (Renaissance)
- The British are Coming (American War of Independence)
- The British Are Coming, Second Edition, (American Revolutionary War, American War of Independence), (Design: Chris Bell; Development: Mark A. Campbell; Tempest Games Co., 1990)
- The Last Days of the Grande Armée (Napoleonic) (Operational Studies Group, 1998)
- The Sword and The Flame (Colonial) (Yaquinto, And That's the Way It Was..., 1979)
- The Thin Red Line (Crimean War) (Rank and File Figures, 1994)
- To Glory We Steer (Age of Sail) (Atkins wargames) Free Rules
- To the Banners (Renaissance)
- To the Sound of the Guns (Napoleonic) (Tabletop Games, 1983)
- Tricolor (Napoleonic) (TSR, Inc., 1975)
- Tricorne (Seven Years War) {Ken Bunger, Z & M Enterprises, 1977)
- Tricorne (18th century) (M.O.D. Games, 1985)
- Two Hundred Years (5mm for 1700–1900) (Tabletop Games, 1988)
- Vive L′Empereur (Napoleonic) (Chaosium Rulesbook, 1981)
- Volley & Bayonet (GDW Games, 1994), followed by Volley & Bayonet: Road to Glory (Test of Battle Games, 2008)
- War by Sail (Ostfront Publishing, 2019)
- Warfare in the Age of Discovery
- Warfare in the Age of Reason
- Wargamer's Guide to the English Civil War (William B. Protz jr., 1977)
- Wargames Rules 1750-1850 (Wargames Research Group, 1971)
- Wargames Rules 1685-1845 (Wargames Research Group, 1979)
- Wargaming the Age of Marlborough (Editions Brokaw, 1985)
- Warhammer English Civil War (Warhammer Historical Wargames Ltd, 2002)
- The Whites of Their Eyes (American War of Independence) (Canadian Wargamers Group, 1997)

== American Civil War ==
Hardtack Rulebook (1971).

- A Glint of Bayonets (Sergeants 3, 2005)
- Altar of Freedom (Greg Wagman, 2013)
- American Civil War (Cliff Knight & Peter Dennis, 1986)
- American Battlelines (ODGW LLC, 1999)
- Blue-Light Manual (Fantasy Games Unlimited, 1976)
- Brother Against Brother (Stratagem Publications Ltd, 1997)
- Call to the Colors free rules for ACW 15mm miniatures. (Fred Ehlers, 2010)
- Circa 1863 (Bob Cooper, Tabletop Games, 1978)
- Enduring Valor: Gettysburg in Miniature (Marek/Janci Designs, Vol.1 2002, Vol. 2 2004)
- Fire and Fury (Quantum Publishing, 1990)
- Hardtack (Guidon Games, 1971)
- Iron and Fire (David Manley, 2005)
- Ironclad (Guidon Games, 1973)
- Gettysburg Soldiers (Larry Reber and Justin Reber, 2010)
- Honor & Glory (David Marks, unknown)
- Johnny Reb (John Hill, Game Designers' Workshop, 1988), Johnny Reb III (The Johnny Reb Gaming Company, 1996)
- Kepi and Musket (Peter Morffew, 2006)
- Mr. Lincoln's War ([Stephen Phenow, Terry Gore (game designers)], [Quantum Printing], 2000)
- Mr. Lincoln's War: Army of the Potomac and Mr. Lincoln's War: Army of the Tennessee (3W (World Wide Wargames), 1983)
- On To Richmond (The Courier Publishing Co. Inc., 1983)
- Rally Round the Flag (Battleline, 1975)
- Rally Once More! V 6 (Computer Moderated Miniature Wargame Rules) (Computer Strategies, 2007)
- Some Wore Blue and Some Wore Gray (Raymond (Ray) James Jackson, 2012)
- The American Civil War, 2nd Edition (T.J. Halsall, Newbury Rules, 1977)
- The American Civil War (A to Z Rules, 1994)
- Whipping Bobby Lee (Ragnar Brothers, 1990)
- Hex Command Gunpowder (Terry Cabak, 2000)

== Colonial ==
- A Good Dusting
- Age of Empires
- Blood and Sand
- Colonial Adventures by Two Hour Wargames
- Imperial Wars, Colonial Warfare Rules 1860-1900 (M.O.D. Games, 1985)
- Little Wars By H. G. Wells (Victorian Colonial Wars) (H. G. Wells, 1913; DBA Skirmisher Publishing, 2004)
- Rules for Wargames in the 1880 Period Including Colonial Wars (Typescript, Donald F. Featherstone)
- Savage Wars of Peace (Victorian Colonial) (Mark Hayes, Tim Goodlett, Poor Beggars in Red Games, 1989)
- Science versus Pluck, or "Too Much for the Mahdi"
- Soldiers of the Queen (Tabletop Games)
- Sons of the Desert (French Foreign Legion in North Africa) (Old Glory, unknown)
- The Colonial Skirmish Wargame Rules, C. 1850-1900 (Michael R. Blake, Ian M Colwill, Stephen Curtis, Edwin J. Herbert, 1972)
- The Sword and the Flame
- The New Zealand Wars (Ostfront Publishing, 2016)
- Muskets & Tomahawks (Skirmishes in North America during the 18th century) (Alexandre Buchel, Studio Tomahawk, 2012)
- The Men Who Would be Kings (Osprey Publishing)

== Industrial ==
- Bugles, Boots and Saddles (Sergeants 3, 2010)
- Chassepot & Needlegun (Franco-Prussian War) (Frontier Miniatures, 1985)
- Grande Bataille, Grande Victoire (European Land Warfare from 1853-1871 by JW Brown) (Absinthe Press, 1991)
- Gutshot (American Old West) (Mike Mitchell, Mike Murphy & Paul Mauer, Hawgleg Publishing, 2005)
- Hey You in the Jail! (American Old West) (Peter Pig, unknown)
- Ikonki - Russo-Japanese Land Wars (Ostfront Publishing, 2016)
- Imperial Splendour V 6 (Computer Moderated Wargame Rules) (Computer Strategies, 2007)
- In Her Majesty's Name (Osprey Publishing, 2013)
- Legends of the Old West (Warhammer Historical Games Ltd, 2004)
- Once Upon a Time in the West: Rules for Gunfight Wargames (Ian S. Beck and John D. Spencer, 1978)
- Pony Wars, or 'B' Troop Ain't Coming Back (Indian Wars) (Ian S. Beck, Tabletop Games, 1980)
- Red Actions (Russian Civil War) (The Perfect Captain, unknown)
- Santa Anna Rules! (Mexican and Texas Wars of Independence, Mexican–American War) (Buck Surdu and Pete Panzeri, 1998)
- Sebastopol, Sadowa, and Sedan (19th Century Warfare) (T.J. Halsall, J.G. Kew, and A.M. Roth, Newbury Rules, 1981)
- Six-Gun Sound: Blaze of Glory (American Old West) (Two-Hour Wargames, 2007)
- The Genuine and Original Old West Skirmish Rules, 1816-1900, 3rd Edition (Steve Curtis, Mike Blake, and Ian Colwill, Lou Zocchi, 1975)
- Tombstones n' Tumbleweeds (American Old West) (Game Werks, 2004)
- Warpaint (Indian Wars) (Emperor's Press/Old Glory Miniatures, 1996)
- Western Gunfight Wargame Rules (American Old West) (Curtis Brothers, 1971)
- Yellow Ribbon (Indian Wars, 1850–1890) (Greg Novak, Mike Gilbert illustrations) (Ulster Imports, 1988)
- The Great Powers - Post-Napoleonic Warfare V 6 (Computer Moderated Miniature Wargame Rules) (Computer Strategies, 2007)
- They Died For Glory (Franco-Prussian War) (Quantum Printing Company, 1992)

== World War I ==
- A War Transformed: WWI on the Doggerland Front (OSprey Games, 2023)
- Age of Dreadnoughts (Mongoose Publishing, 2009)
- Air War 1918 (David Manley, 2007)
- Aces at Dawn (Majestic Twelve Games, 2005)
- Algernon Pulls it Off (Too Fat Lardies, 2006)
- Blue Max (board game) Phil Hall
- Canvas Eagles (Eric Hotz, unknown)
- Challenge & Reply! WW1 Naval (Agema.org.uk, 2000)
- Contemptible Little Armies (HLBS Publishing, 2002)
- Cordite and Steel (TSR, Inc., 1977)
- Desert Column V 6 (Computer Moderated Miniature Wargame Rules) (Computer Strategies, 2007)
- Dogfight Over Flanders, WWI Aerial Combat Rules (Mike Thomas and Kev Smith, Tabletop Games, 1992)
- Dogfight! (Ostfront Publishing, 2016)
- Fear God & Dread Naught (Clash of Arms Games, 2000)
- Fleet Action Imminent (Old Dominion GamesWorks, 2008)
- Grand Fleets (Majestic Twelve Games, 2004)
- Great War (Terry Sirk and Fred Haub, 1985)
- If the Lord Spares Us (Too Fat Lardies, 2005)
- Mein Panzer WW1 Data Book (ODGW LLC, unknown)
- October Revolt (Russian Civil War) (B & B Miniatures, 1994)
- Over the Top (Greg Novak) (Command Decision series) (Game Designers' Workshop, 1990)
- Price of Glory (Iron Ivan Games, 2006)
- Square Bashing 1914–1918 (Peter Pig, 1997)
- Tanks & Yanks WWI Late War 1917 to 1918 (Philip Viverito/LMW Works LLC 2017 LMW Works: publishing tabletop wargame rules sets, historical non-fiction, spiritual texts, & retail catalogs since 1998)
- The Last Crusade (Great War in Palestine, Mesopotamia, Africa) (Tim Goodlett, Mark Hayes, Poor Beggars in Red Games, 1991)
- Trench (Tabletop Games, 1975)
- Trench Storm (The Tin Dictator/Ivan Sorensen, 2003)
- Trench Wars (Old Glory, 2004)
- Triumph and Tragedy (Tischrabauken Productions - Björn Reichel Triumph & Tragedy Adventure Wargame Rules/ 2007 )
- Triumph of the Will (Russian Civil War, Spanish Civil War) (Too Fat Lardies, 2001)
- World War 1 Wargames Rules (Skytrex, unknown)(Roger Edward Bigg, The Mailed Fist Wargames Group)
- Westfront (Ostfront Publishing, 2016)

== World War II ==
- 1-48COMBAT (Baueda Wargames, 2009)
- 1944, 3rd Edition (Arnold Hendrick, Dick Bryant, Peter Lowry) (New England Wargamers Association, 1974)
- Action Stations (David Manley, 2000)
- Air Combat (T.H. Halsall, Leicester Micromodels Ltd, and Heritage Models, Inc., 1977)
- Air War 1940 (David Manley, 2011)
- Ambush Blitz! (2007)
- Angriff! (Z&M Publishing Enterprises, 1968)
- Arc of Fire (TAC Publications, 2002)
- Art of Tactic (Zvezda LLC, 2012)
- Armour & Infantry 1925 - 1950 (War Games Research Group, 1973)
- Assault Gun (David Kershaw, 2006)
- Axis & Allies Miniatures (Wizards of the Coast, 2004)
- Axis & Allies Naval Miniatures: War at Sea (Wizards of the Coast, 2007)
- ADMIRAL (LuxLu, 2010)
- Bag the Hun (Too Fat Lardies, 2005)

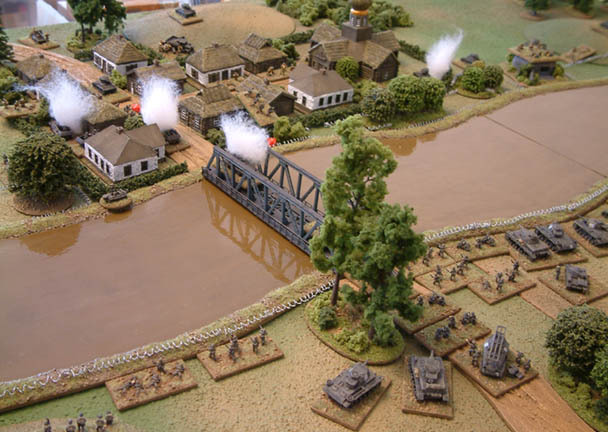
Blitzkrieg Commander

- Battlefield Evolution: World At War (Mongoose Publishing, 2008)
- Battlefront WWII (Fire and Fury Games, 2000)
- Battlegroup (Kursk, Overlord, Fall of the Reich, Blitzkrieg and Barbarossa) (Iron Fist Publishing, 2011, Written by Warwick Kinrade)
- Blitzkrieg (Onyx Editions, 2006)
- BlitzkriegCommander (Specialist Military Publishing, 2009)
- "Bullet" (Richard Bailey, Tiny Wargames 2015)
- Bolt Action (Rick Priestley & Alessio Cavatore, Warlord Games, 2012)
- Chain of Command (Richard Clarke, TooFatLardies, 2013)
- Combined Arms (Ian Shaw, Tabletop Games, 1983)
- Command Decision (Game Designers' Workshop, 1986) followed by version 2 and 3 (Emperor's Press 1996) and Command Decision: Test of Battle (Test of Battle Games 2006)
- Command at Sea Vols I-VII (Clash of Arms Games, 1994)
- Crossfire (Quantum Printing, 1996)
- Disposable Heroes & Coffin for Seven Brothers (Iron Ivan Games, 2004)
- Easy Eight's Battleground WWII (Easy Eight Enterprises)
- eRules World War II (WargameSystems, 2001)
- The Face of Battle (Meramic Enterprises, 2001)
- Fast Micro-Armour Rules for World War II (Reginald D. Steiner, 1981)
- Fast Rules (Armored Operations Society, 1970)
- Final Combat (Britton Publishers, 2004)
- Final Round (n/a, 2006)
- Firefly (Table Top Games, 1987)
- Flames of War (Battlefront Ltd, 2002)
- The Fletcher Pratt Naval Wargame (Fletcher Pratt, 1943)
- G.I. Commander (Enola Games/Navwar, 1984)
- General Quarters (World War Two Naval Warfare, 1/2400 scale) (L.L. Gill, CinC Soft Metal Castings, 1975)
- General Quarters 2 (20th Century Naval Warfare, 1/2400) (L.L. Gill, CinC Soft Metal Castings, 1977)
- General Quarters (Old Dominion GameWorks, unknown)
- Great Battles of World War II (Bruce McFarlane, The Canadian Wargames Group, 1995)
- Grey Storm, Red Steel (Firebase Games, 1995)
- Guts 'N Glory (GTB, 2006)
- Hour of Glory (Warm Acre, 2004)
- I Ain't Been Shot Mum! (Too Fat Lardies, 2002)
- Iron Tigers V 6 (Computer Moderated Miniature Wargame Rules) (Computer Strategies, 2007)
- Jagdpanzer (World War Two armor combat) (Kevin Cabai, 1975)
- Jagdpanzer, 2nd Edition (World War Two armor combat) (Kevin Cabai, 2012)
- Kampfgruppe (Historical Alternatives, 1979)
- Lacquered Coffins (WWII Air Combat) (Ostfront Publishing, 2017)
- Korps Commander - The Road to Berlin (TableTop Games, 1988)
- Lightning War - Red Storm v3 (Andrew Stevenson, 2013)
- Look Sarge No Charts (LMW Works, 2007)
- Mein Panzer (Old Dominion GameWorks, 1998)
- Mein Panzer Core Rules (Old Dominion GameWorks, 2002)
- Micro Armour: The Game - WWII (GHQ, 2001)
- Micro Tactics: Brightly Illustrated, Simplified rules for 1:144 Scale Armor (Seth Koukol, 2012)
- Naval Action: A Simple Combat Resolution System for Model Fleets of the 1898-1945 Era (Louis R. Coatney, 1997)
- Naval Warfare '39--'45 (Keith Robinson, Leicester Micromodels and Heritage Models, Inc., 1976)
- Nuts! (Two Hour Wargames, 2005)
- Operation Warboard (World War II, 20-25mm) (Gavin Lyall, Adam and Charles Black, London, 1976)
- Ostfront (Ostfront Publishing, 2016)
- Panzer Marsch! (North Hull Wargames Club, 1999)
- Panzer Miniatures (StrikeNet Games, 2004)
- PanzerTruppe (LMW Works, 2004)
- Panzer Warfare (TSR Games, Inc., 1975)(Brian Blume)
- Patrol: WWII (Skirmish, WWII) (Damond Crump, 2006)
- Poor Bloody Infantry (PBI) and Poor Bloody Infantry 2 (Peter Pig, 2000, 2006)
- Rapid Fire! (Stratagem Publications Ltd, 1994)
- Rules of Engagement (Great Escape Games, 2007)
- Salvo! WW2 Naval (Agema.org.uk, 2007)
- Schwere Kompanie (RitterKrieg, 2001)
- Spearhead (Quantum Printing, 1995)
- Spitting Fire (Majestic Twelve Games, 2006)
- Sturmovik Commander (Marcin Gerkowicz, 2008)
- Tactical Commander; Rules for World War II Skirmish Wargames (Andrew Rathmell, Tabletop Games, 1982)
- The Wargame Battletracker (Hobby Pursuit LLC, 2009)
- Tide of Iron (Fantasy Flight Games, 2007; Re-print 1A Games, 2014)
- Tigers and Stalins—Micro Armor Tank Rules (Mind Games, unknown)
- Tractics (Guidon Games, 1971)
- Troops, Weapons & Tactics (Too Fat Lardies, 2007)
- T-34 (Strategy & Tactics Magazine, 1970)
- Victory at Sea (Nassau Naval & Military Historical Society, 1971)
- Victory at Sea (Mongoose Publishing, 2006)
- War Games Rules Armour & Infantry 1925-1950, (Wargames Research Group, June 1973)
- World War II Infantry Action (Mid-20th Century Section/Platoon combat) (Mike Klaka, Trevor Halsall, Newbury Rules, 1986)
- Hex Command Mechanized (Terry Cabak, 2000)

== Modern ==
- Armis Armis Board Game
- Force on Force (Ambush Alley Games, 2011)
- A Fistful of TOWs (A Fistful of Games, 1998)
- AK47 Republic (Peter Pig, 1997)
- Ambush Alley! (Ambush Alley Games, 2007)
- Armour & Infantry 1950 - 1975 (War Games Research Group, 1975)
- Boocoo Fire Mission (Vietnam War) (Ostfront Publishing, 2022)
- Battlegroup (Ian Clarke, 2009)
- Bulldogs Away (David Manley, 2006)
- Charlie Company (Ulster Imports, 1986)
- Combined Arms (Command Decision series) (Game Designers' Workshop, 1988)
- Command Decision (2nd edition, Game Designers' Workshop, 1992)
- Conflict 2000 (Tactical Command Games, 1996)
- Cold War Commander (Specialist Military Publishing, 2006)
- Cornered Wolf (Chechen Wars) (Ostfront Publishing, 2018)
- Corps Commander - Operational Manoeuvre Group (Bruce Rea Taylor, 1986)
- Desert Whirlwind V 6 (Computer Moderated Miniature Wargame Rules) (Computer Strategies, 2007)
- Dogs of War (modern skirmish) (JC McDaniel, Devil Dog Design, 2002)
- Flashpoint Vietnam (Flashpoint Miniatures, 2006)
- Fox Two (David Manley, 1995)
- Harpoon (Clash of Arms Games)
- Hind & Seek (Soviet-Afghan War) (Ostfront Publishing, 2017)
- Land and Airborne Assault (Peter Morffew, updated May 2009 )
- Lethal Skies (Talion Games 2018)
- Megablitz (Multi-period 20th century) (Tim Gow, unknown)
- Mekong...Vietnam (Vietnam War) (Martin Fenelon) (GHQ, 1987)
- The Men of Company B (Vietnam) (Peter Pig, unknown)
- Micro Armour: The Game - Modern (1946–present days) (GHQ, 2004)
- Missile Threat (Air Combat 1960 - 2000) (Ostfront Publishing, 2018)
- Modern Ops (Great White Games, 2005)
- Modern Spearhead (Quantum Printing, 2000)
- Operation Nam (A Squad to Platoon Level Wargame for Miniatures by JW Brown) (Absinthe Press, 1992)
- Phoenix Command (Leading Edge Games, 1986)
- Sand, Oil, and Blood, Armored Combat in the 1990s (Martin Fenelon, Kevin Cabai) (Sutton Hoo Games 1991)
- SeaTac (Modern naval surface/air/submarine rules) (William Likens, Q-Games, 1980)
- Shipwreck (Vandering Publications, 1999)
- Special Forces (M.O.D. Games, 1982)
- Spectre Operations (Spectre Miniatures, 2017)
- TacForce (Game Designers' Workshop)
- Team Yankee (Cold War 1983) (Battlefront Miniatures Ltd, 2015)
- Tractics (WW2 and Modern) (Mike Reese, Leon Tucker, Gary Gygax, Guidon Games, 1971)
- Wargames Research Group Armour and Infantry 1950–1975

== Other historical/alternate history ==
- .45 Adventures (Pulp Era) (Rattrap Productions, 2005)
- All Things Zombie (Zombies) (Two Hour Wargames, 2006)
- Ambush Z! (Zombies) (Ambush Alley Games, 2008)
- Apocalypse: Earth Open source rules under development by JM Games
- Battlelust (Columbia Games, 1992)
- Chinese Takeout (Atkins Wargames) Kung Fu and Magic
- Crimson Skies (1930s Pulp Aerial Combat) (FASA, 1998)
- Carnevale - The Miniatures Game (Venetian alternate horror) (TTCombat, 2017)
- Cthulhu: Xothic Wars (Cthulhu Mythos Monster Combat) (Gobbotown Games, 2018)
- Down Styphon! (Pike and Shot) (Fantasy Games Unlimited, 1977)
- Dystopian Legions (Victorian steampunk) Spertan games, 2012
- Dystopian Wars (Victorian steampunk) Spartan games, 2010
- Dust Warfare (WW2, alternate timeline, mecha, pulp) Fantasy Flight Games, 2012
- G.A.S.L.I.G.H.T. (Victorian Science Fiction) (Surdu, Palmer and Beattie, 2003)
- Gear Krieg (WW2 mecha combat) (Dream Pod 9, 2000)
- Hard Vacuum (WW2 spaceship combat) (Fat Messiah Games, 2000)
- Iron Stars (Edwardian spaceship combat) (Majestic Twelve Games, 2004)
- Ironclads & Ether Flyers (Victorian science fiction naval combat) (Game Designers' Workshop 1990, Heliograph, Inc. 2000)
- Konflikt 47 (WW2 alternate timeline, mech, pulp, base on Bolt Action)
- Occult Wars
- Pulp City (1980s superheroes and action adventure) (Pulp Monsters, 2004)
- Secrets of the Third Reich (alternative WW2) (West Wind Miniatures/Grindhouse Games, 2008)
- Soldier's Companion (Victorian science fiction) (Game Designers' Workshop 1989, Heliograph, Inc. 2001)
- Trench Crusade (alternative WWI, horror fantasy) (independent, 2016)
- Zombie-A-Go-Go (zombies co-operative players) (Monomer Games, 2010)

== Abstract/generic/multiple time periods ==
- Argad! (multiple time periods, RPG minded)
- Brikwars (N/A, 1995)
- Digital Empires (Ancients, Medieval, World War I, World War II, Science Fiction, Fantasy) (Crunchy Frog Enterprises, 1996)
- Fistful of Lead (Wiley Games, 2019)
- Full Command (Setting agnostic) (Serious Lemon, 2015)
- Gear Krieg (Mecha WW2) (Dream Pod 9, 2001)
- PUMMEL! ("Pick-Up, Multigenre Miniatures, Easy to Learn") (Polymancer Studios, Inc.)
- Sharp Practice! (Multi-Period Black Powder) (TooFatLardies, 2008)
- Skirmish Wargaming (Donald Featherstone, 1975)
- ShockForce (Universal rules for miniatures) (Demonblade Games, unknown)
- Tempus Mortis (Blight Games 2022)
- The Portable Wargame generic/multiple time periods (Bob Cordery 2016) Uses hex and square grid system. ISBN 9781326904586
- "Table Top Battles" generic/multiple time periods (Mike and Joyce Smith 2007) Uses a 2" (50mm) and 4" (100mm) grid system. 2nd Edition ISBN 978-1-5272-3437-6 generic/multiple time periods (Mike and Joyce Smith 2018)
- "Wings at War" (Aerial, WWI-Falklands War) (Chris Sulley)

== Science fiction ==
- 2184 Generation War (avril 2016)
- 5150 (Two Hour Wargames, 2006)
- Aeronautica Imperialis (Forge World, 2007)
- Aeronef (Wessex Games, unknown)
- “All Quiet on the Martian Front” (Alien Dungeon)
- Alien Squad Leader (15mm.co.uk, 2005)
- A Call to Arms: Babylon 5 Space Combat (Mongoose Publishing, 2004)
- A Fistful of Sardaukar (A Fistful of Games, unknown)
- AT-43 (Rackham, 2006)
- Attack Vector: Tactical (Ad Astra Games, 2004)
- Atomic Super Humans (Radioactive Press, 2010)
- Babylon 5 Wars (Agents of Gaming, 1998)
- Batman Miniature Game (Knight Models, 2012)
- Battlefield Evolution (Mongoose Publishing, 2007)
- Battlefleet Gothic (Games Workshop, 1999)
- BEAMSTRIKE (Open source, Unknown)
- Beyond the Gates of Antares (Warlord Games)
- CAV: Combat Assault Vehicle (Reaper Miniatures, 2006)
- Chain Reaction (Two Hour Wargames, 2000)
- Battletech (FASA, 1984)
- Combat Zone (EM4 Miniatures, 2011)
- Critter Commandos (Crunchy Frog Enterprises, 1989)
- CyborGladiators (Firefly Games, 2004)
- Dark Age (Cool Mini Or Not, 2002)
- Dark Horizon: Escape (Advanced Primate Entertainment Games, 1996)
- Dark Potential (MiniWarGaming, 2011)
- DC Universe Miniature Game (Knight Models, 2017)
- Defiance (Majestic Twelve Games, 2001)
- Dirtside (Ground Zero Games, 1989)
- Dirtside II (Ground Zero Games, 1993)

Second Edition Full Thrust Rulebook.

- Dropfleet Commander (Hawk Wargames, 2016, TT Combat as of 2017)
- Dropzone Commander (Hawk Wargames, 2012, TT Combat as of 2017)
- Epic, various editions known as Adeptus Titanicus/Space Marine (1988/89), Warhammer Epic 40,000 (1997) and Epic Armageddon, (Games Workshop, 1988 onwards)
- Fast And Dirty (Ivan Sorensen, 2004)
- Firestorm: Armada (Spartan Games, 2009)
- Flashpoint! (Virtual Fusion Press, unknown)
- Full Thrust (Ground Zero Games, 1992)
- Future War Commander (Specialist Military Publishing, 2008)
- Galactic Control (Armchair Assassin, 2011)
- Galactic-Conflict in the Stars (Arbron Imagineering / Iron Wind Metals, 2011)
- Galactic Warfare (Skytrex, 1973)
- Gangs of Mega-City One (Mongoose Publishing, 2005)
- Gaslands (Osprey Publishing, 2017)
- Giant Monster Rampage (Radioactive Press, 2002)
- Giants: The Action Figure Game of Colossal Combat (Ken Lewis, 2019)
- Gorkamorka (Games Workshop, 1997)
- Gruntz 15mm SCI-FI (Rottenlead, 2010)
- Halo: Fleet Battles (Spartan Games, 2015)
- Halo OTT (The OTTgameteam, 2007)
- Heavy Gear (Dream Pod 9, 1989)
- Holes (Tri Tac Systems, 1995)
- Hostile Stars (Dark Realm Miniatures, 2010)
- The Hunt: The Ultimate Arena Sport (Maverick Games, 1991)
- Infinity (Corvus Belli, 2005)
- Iron Cow 2103ad (Wessex Games, 1995, reprinted 2002)
- Jovian Chronicles (Dream Pod 9, 1992)
- Jump Trooper (A Fistful of Games, unknown)
- Kryomek (Fantasy Forge Ltd, 1991)
- Laserburn (Bryan Ansell, Tabletop Games, 1980)
- LaserGrenadiers (Godfox Enterprises, unknown)
- Legions of Steel (Global Games Company, 1992)
- Mars Ascendant - Sci-Fi V 6 (Computer Moderated Miniature Wargame Rules) (Computer Strategies, 2007)
- Mecha Carnage (Gomi Designs, 1996)
- MechWarrior: Dark Age, MechWarrior: Age of Destruction (WizKids, 2002, 2006)
- Mega Bots (Radioactive Press, 2010)
- MERCS (Mercs Minis, 2010)
- Mighty Monsters (Ganesha Games, 2011, also published in Italian language as Megamostri )
- Mindstalkers (ManorHouse Miniatures, 2004)
- Mobius (Ioan Davies-John, 2020)
- Monster Island: The Game of Giant Monster Combat (Firefly Games, 2002)
- Monster Mash (Radioactive Press, 2011)
- Monsters! (Dark Tower Enterprises, 1990)
- Mutants and Death Ray Guns (Ganesha Games, 2008)
- Necromunda (Games Workshop, 1998)
- Necromunda (Games Workshop, 1995)
- New World Disorder (Precis Intermedia Gaming, 2008)
- Nuclear Renaissance (Ramshackle Studios, 2007)
- OGRE Miniatures (Steve Jackson Games, 1992)
- OHMU War Machine, 1992 (TBA Games)
- Omega Warrior (Flagship Games, 1998)
- Planet 28 (Mammoth miniatures, 2020)
- Power Warriors (Radioactive Press, 2009)
- Princess Ryan's Space Marines (Simulations Tacticals (SIMTACS), 1991)
- Railgun 2100 (A Fistful of Games, unknown)
- Renegade Legion (FASA, 1987)
- Rezolution (Aberrant Games, 2004)
- "Ronin: Duels" (Cell Entertainment AB)
- "Ronin: Wars" (Cell Entertainment AB)
- "Robotech: RPG Tactics" (Palladium Books/Ninja Division/Soda Pop Miniatures/Cipher Studios, June 2014 – present)
- Saganami Island Tactical Simulator (Ad Astra Games, 2005)
- Samurai Robots Battle Royale (Ganesha Games, 2013)
- Seeds of War (Dark Realm Miniatures, 2008)
- Sentai Heroes (Radioactive Press, 2011)
- Shockforce (Demonblade, 1998)
- Slammer (Chris and Alex Nicole, unknown)
- Skirmish Tactics Apocalypse (2013)
- Space Marines (Fantasy Games Unlimited, 1980)
- Space Fleet (Games Workshop, 1991)
- Spacerfarers(Games Workshop Ltd., 1981)
- Spinespur(Comfy Chair Games., 2007)
- Squadron Commander 3600 (Mariner Games, 1997)
- Squadron Strike (Ad Astra Games, 1st Ed. 2008, 2nd Ed. 2016)
- $tar Corp$: Call to Battle! (Lance and Laser Models Inc., Crunchy Frog Enterprises, 1992)
- Star Fleet Battles (Task Force Games, 1979)
- Star Wars Legion (Fantasy Flight Games, 2017)
- Star Wars Miniatures (Wizards of the Coast, 2004)
- Star Wars Miniatures Battles (West End Games, 1991)
- Star Trek: Starship Tactical Combat Simulator (Fasa Corporation, 1986)
- Stargrunt II (Ground Zero Games, 1996)
- Starguard! (McEwan Miniatures, 1974)
- Starmada (Majestic Twelve Games, 2000)
- Starship Marine (Jim Wallman, 1974)
- Starship Troopers: The Miniatures Game (Mongoose Publishing, 2005)
- StarSoldier (Simulations Publications, Inc., 1977)
- Strike Team Alpha (Gamescience, 1978)
- Striker (Game Designers' Workshop, 1981)
- Striker II (Game Designers' Workshop, 1996)
- Stellar Fire (Tactical Command Games 1996, 2000)
- Stellar Conflicts & Uprisings (Tactical Command Games 1996, 2000)
- Strikeforce (Agema.org.uk, 2007)
- Survive: Mob Rool (The OTTgameteam, 2009)
- Swatters: Large Scale Bug Hunting Rules (Ganesha Games, 2013)
- Tactical Strike (Atlantis Games, 1999)
- Total Extinction (Sentinel Games, 2013)
- Universal War (Black Skull Games 2007)
- Urban War (Urban Mammoth, 2005)
- Vehicular Homicide (Radioactive Press, 2010)
- Verge of War (IFG Gaming, 2018)
- VOID (i-Kore Miniatures, 2000)
- VOR: The Maelstrom (FASA, 1999)
- Warbots & Death Machines (1985)
- Warcosm (Precis Intermedia Gaming, 2008)
- WarEngine (Universal Rules for Sci-Fi miniatures and more.)
- Warhammer 40,000 (Games Workshop, 1987)
- Warlands (Aberrant Games, 2009)
- Warzone (Target Games, 1995)
- Warpath (Mantic Games, 2011)
- Wrath of Kings (Cool Mini Or Not, 2013)

== Fantasy ==
- A Fistfull of Miniatures (North Shore Press, 1986; Precis Intermedia Gaming, 2009)
- A Song of Ice and Fire: Tabletop Miniatures Game (CMON Limited, Dark Swords Miniatures, Inc., 2018)
- Alkemy (Kraken Editions, 2008; Alchemist Miniatures, 2013)
- Aminouch! (Camberley Area Wargames Society (CAWS), 1995)
- Anima: Tactics (Cipher Studios/Fantasy Flight Games, 2006)
- Archworld (Fantasy Games Unlimited, 1977)
- ArcWorlde ( Warp Miniatures, 2020)
- Armies of Arcana (Thanes Games, 1997)
- Battle of Five Armies (Games Workshop, 2001)
- Battle Masters (Games Workshop, MB, 1992)
- Battle Rage (Goblin Games)
- Battlelust (Columbia Games, 1992)
- Battlestorm (Ral Partha Publishing, 1997)
- Bladestorm (Iron Crown Enterprises, 1990)
- Bellicose Fantasy Battles (Sanity Studios, 2009)
- Blood Bowl (Games Workshop, 1987)
- Bushido (GCT Studios, 2011)
- Burrows and Badgers( Osprey games, 2018)
- Brushfire (On The Lamb Games, 2010)
- Brutal quest (Mammoth miniatures, 2021)
- Celtos (Brigade Models, 2002)
- Citadel (Fantasy Games Unlimited, unknown)
- Confrontation (Rackham, 2000)
- Dungeons & Dragons Miniatures (Wizards of the Coast, 2003)
- Dwarf Wars (West Wind Productions, unknown)
- Ex illis (Chinchilla Games, 2009)
- Fairy Meat (Kenzer & Company, 2000)
- Fantasy Warlord (Gary Chalk & Ian Bailey, Folio Works, 1990)
- Fantasy Rules! 2nd Ed (Chipco)
- Fantasy Warriors (Grenadier Miniatures UK, 1990)
- Fear and Faith Horror Miniatures Rules (Ganesha Games, 2009)
- For the Masses (Majestic Twelve Games, 2004)
- Freebooter's Fate (Freebooter Miniatures, 2010)
- Frostgrave (Osprey Games, 2015)
- Godslayer (Megalith Games, 2008)
- Golem Arcana (Harebrained Schemes, 2014)
- HAVOC: Tactical Miniature Warfare (Brent Spivey, Voodoo Ink Publishing, 2009)
- Hell Dorado (Asmodée Editions, 2007. Re-release by Cipher Studios, 2011)
- HeroClix (Superhero) (WizKids, 2002)
- Heroscape (Hasbro/Wizards of the Coast, 2004)
- HORDES (Privateer Press, 2006)
- Kings of War (Mantic Games)
- Knights and Magick (Heritage, 1980)
- Hordes of the Things (Wargames Research Group, 1991)
- Legions of the Petal Throne (TSR 1977) ASIN B001ANZ3XK
- Legions Unleashed (Tactical Command Games, 1983, 1996)
- Lord of the Rings Strategy Battle Game (Games Workshop, 2005)
  - War of the Ring (Games Workshop, 2009)
- Mage Knight (WizKids, 2001)
- Malifaux (Wyrd Miniatures, LLC, 2005 )
- Man O' War (Games Workshop, 1993)
- Mazes & Miniatures (Daring Dwarf Games, 2013)
- Middle Earth Wargame Rules (Decalset, 1976)
- Mighty Armies (Mongoose Publishing, 2004)
- Mordheim (Games Workshop, 1999)
- Occult Wars (Stealthy Spider Publishing, 2006)
- Realm - Fantasy Warfare (Serious Lemon, 2012)
- Ring of Rule (Zvezda, 2003)
- Rippers: The Horror Wars (Pinnacle, 2004)
- Royal Armies of the Hyborian Age (Fantasy Games Unlimited, 1975)
- RUMBLESLAM - A game of Fantasy Wrestling (Fantasy Wrestling) (TTCombat, 2017)
- Runewars Miniatures Game (Fantasy Flight Games, 2017)
- Shieldbreaker (HoDstuff/Carnalithic Press, 2011)
- Skull Cleaver - Fantasy V 6 (Computer Moderated Miniature Wargame Rules) (Computer Strategies, 2007)
- Song of Blades and Heroes (Ganesha Games, 2007)
- Supersystem (West Wind Productions, 2000)
- The Age of Might and Steel (Alternative Armies, 2009)
- The Ninth Age: Fantasy Battles (The Ninth Age, 2015)
- Third Kingdom Skirmish Game (Wargame involving animals) (Whimsical Entertainment, unknown)
- Vis Magica (Ordered Flexibility, 2002)
- Waken The Storm (The (Virtual) Armchair General, 2006)
- Warband (Steve Hardy/Pendraken Miniatures, 2015)
- Wargods of Ægyptus (Crocodile Games, 2002)
- Wargods of Olympus (Crocodile Games, 2008)
- Warhammer Fantasy Battle (Games Workshop, 1983)
- Warhammer Age of Sigmar (Games Workshop, 2015)
- Warheads: Medieval Tales (Urban Mammoth, 2010)
- Warlord (Gamer's Guild, 1983)
- Warlord (Reaper Miniatures, 2004)
- WARMACHINE (Privateer Press, 2003)
- Warmaster (Rick Priestley, Games Workshop, 2000)
- Whack & Slaughter (CatZeyeS Entertainment, 2010)
