= FFT (disambiguation) =

A fast Fourier transform is a numerical algorithm used in signal processing.

FFT may also refer to:

== Games ==
- Final Fantasy Tactics, a video game
- A Fistful of TOWs, a miniatures wargame
- Fédération Française de Tarot, the French tarot federation

== Sport ==
- Fédération Française de Tennis, the French Tennis Federation
- Firefighters Upsala CK, a Swedish cycling team
- Football Tasmania, formerly Football Federation Tasmania, a football organisation in Australia
- Four Four Two (4-4-2), a football formation
  - FourFourTwo, a football magazine
  - FourFourTwo (TV series), an Asian football TV series
  - 4-4-2, a band formed to record the song "Come on England" for the England football team for the Euro 2004 championship
- Tajikistan Football Federation (Tajik: Federosijuni futʙoli Toçikiston)

== Science and technology ==
- 2,1-fructan:2,1-fructan 1-fructosyltransferase
- Faculty of Food Technology, Latvia University of Agriculture
- Final-Form Text, part of IBM's Document Control Architecture
- Future Fibre Technologies, an Australian fibre optic company
- Faecal (or fecal) flotation test, a method used in veterinary parasitology to detect helminth eggs in faecal samples

== United States aviation ==
- Frontier Airlines
- Capital City Airport (Kentucky)

== See also ==
- Finite Fourier transform (disambiguation)
