= BKC =

BKC may refer to:

- Bandra Kurla Complex in Mumbai, India
  - BKC metro station, a station of the Mumbai Metro
- Berkman Klein Center for Internet & Society at Harvard University
- Benzalkonium chloride, a type of cationic surfactant
- Beyoncé Knowles-Carter, known as Beyoncé, an American entertainer and pop icon
- BlitzkriegCommander, a tabletop wargame
- Buckland Airport (IATA: BKC), an airport in Alaska
- Burger King, whose NYSE stock symbol was formerly BKC

== See also ==
- ВКС (in cyrillic letters) : the Russian Aerospace Forces (Russian: Воздушно-космические силы)
