= The Eleven Schill Officers =

The Eleven Schill Officers (German: Die elf Schillschen Offiziere) may refer to:

- The Eleven Schill Officers (1926 film), a silent German film directed by Rudolf Meinert
- The Eleven Schill Officers (1932 film), a German sound remake directed by Rudolf Meinert
