= The Eleven Schill Officers (1926 film) =

1926 film directed by Rudolf Meinert

- Directed by: Rudolf Meinert
- Written by: Max Jungk; Julius Urgiß
- Produced by: Rudolf Meinert
- Starring: Rudolf Meinert; Gustav Adolf Semler; Grete Reinwald; Leopold von Ledebur
- Cinematography: Ludwig Lippert
- Production company: Internationale Film
- Distributed by: Meinert Film
- Release date: 27 August 1926
- Country: Germany
- Languages: Silent; German intertitles

The Eleven Schill Officers (German: Die elf Schill'schen Offiziere) is a 1926 German silent historical film directed by Rudolf Meinert and starring Meinert, Gustav Adolf Semler, Grete Reinwald, and Leopold von Ledebur. The film depicts the failed 1809 uprising of Prussian soldiers led by Ferdinand von Schill against the occupying French during the Napoleonic War. The film received poor reviews from critics, but earned enough at the box office to offset its production costs.

According to IMDB, it was released in the USA as "Eleven Who Were Loyal" in 1929. A NY Times review which also covers several other movies of that same date is available online dated from May 20, 1929.

It was part of the cycle of Prussian films. The film was remade by Meinert as a sound film The Eleven Schill Officers in 1932 with Carl de Vogt cast as Schill.

== Cast ==
- Rudolf Meinert as Major von Schill
- Gustav Adolf Semler as König Friedrich Wilhelm III von Preußen
- Grete Reinwald as Königin Luise
- Leopold von Ledebur as Freiherr von Wedel
- Mary Nolan as Marie von Wedel, his daughter
- Ernst Rückert as Fritz von Wedel, his son
- Werner Pittschau as Udo von Reckenthin
- Fritz Greiner as Freiherr von Mallwitz
- Albert Steinrück as Französischer Kommmandant
- Charles Willy Kayser as französischer Offizier
- Camilla von Hollay as Minne
- Henri Peters-Arnolds as Franz, ein Knecht
- John Mylong as Freischärler
- Else Reval
- Aruth Wartan
- Fred Immler
- Edgar Hellwald
- Jaro Fürth
- Mark Asarow
- Clementine Plessner
- Emmerich Hanus
- Rudolf del Zopp
- Kurt Thormann
- Bobbie Bender

== Bibliography ==
- Bock, Hans-Michael; Bergfelder, Tim, eds. (2009). The Concise Cinegraph: Encyclopaedia of German Cinema. New York: Berghahn Books. ISBN 978-1-57181-655-9.
- Mustafa, Sam A. (2008). The Long Ride of Major Von Schill: A Journey Through German History and Memory. Lanham, MD: Rowman & Littlefield. ISBN 978-0-7425-5743-7.
