= Nuclear Renaissance (wargame) =

- Manufacturers: Ramshackle Games
- Designers: Gil Harrison and Curtis Fell
- Illustrators: Curtis Fell
- Publishers: Ramshackle Games
- Years active: 2005 to present
- Players: 2+
- Playing time: Varies
- Chance: Dice rolling
- Skills: Tactical, arithmetic
- Website: http://www.ramshacklegames.co.uk/

Nuclear Renaissance is a tabletop miniature wargame produced by Ramshackle Games, set in a science fiction, Post-apocalypse Earth setting. Nuclear Renaissance was created by Gil Harrison and Curtis Fell in 2005

== Setting ==
Nuclear Renaissance takes place in some undetermined time in Earth's future, in the aftermath of a long forgotten war. "Wars, over-consumption and the wanton destruction of [the] environment has left the earth as a barren rock". Nuclear bombs, biological agents, and poisons have scoured the Earth's surface leaving only a handful of humans alive. A nuclear winter has occurred devastating the biodiversity of the planet, leaving the remaining humans to scavenge and battle for what limited resources were left. The radiation has deformed and mutated many humans, so they appear in a wide range of sizes. Makeshift vehicles cobbled together from old wrecks form an important part of the survival of the marauding bands that roam the scorched earth.

== Gangs ==
Each character a player buys is classed as Hero, Soldier, or Goon in descending order of cost/ability. They have 650 points to construct a gang and equip them with weapons, skills, and vehicles. Thus, a gang may consist of 2 or 3 highly valued members, or 20 expendable ones.

Players may also purchase specialists, who are classed as soldiers. Types of specialist are:

- Mechanic – can fix damages vehicles on the field.
- Medics – can treat wounds of injured characters.
- Bards – can rally troops and remove shock tokens.

Alternatively, characters may have these skills purchased for them individually.

== Character Statistics ==
Each character has 7 statistics

- Aptitude – Dictates order of play and general ability of character
- Combat – Shows relative close-quarters combat ability
- Ranged – Shows ranged weapon ability
- Dodge – Shows ability to avoid ranged attacks
- Dodge Dice – Number of dice player rolls when dodging
- Action Points – How many different actions a character can make in a turn
- Points – Overall value/cost of character

== Game Mechanics ==
Nuclear Renaissance is turn-based, with each player activating one figure at a time during that turn. When all players have activated all figures the turn ends and a new turn begins. 10-sided dice (D10) are used.

Each figure has a set number of Action Points that they can use to move, shoot, aim, &c. When all Action Points are used up, that figure's turn is over and the next player moves a figure. No figure may move more than once per turn.

Figures are activated in order of Aptitude, so a hero with high aptitude will always move before a goon with low aptitude on the same team. The hero may skip his turn and go later in the sequence, if so then the opposing player gets to activate their next figure.

== Shock ==
"During the hurly-burly of a battle, unexpected events, injuries and close calls can all spook a fighter."

A unique aspect of Nuclear Renaissance is Shock. A model is penalised with shock tokens when it is involved in a vehicular crash, a near miss from a gun or combat, &c. Shock tokens accumulate and each one reduces the core statistics of the character. They can be removed by expending action points during the game.
