= Pulp City =

Miniatures game

Pulp City is a superhero tabletop miniatures game created by Pulp Monsters, set in the 1980s in a fictional location called Pulp City, which is located on the West Coast of the US. Pulp City is skirmish game for anywhere from 3+ Supremes per Team (recommended). Players use a system of Action Points to regulate use of Actions when models are Activated. Activations usually alternate between players, although specific special abilities allow interruptions to this sequence.

Two or more players choose Teams and fight out Encounters in the streets of Pulp City. Teams are selected from the two available Factions (Heroes or Villains; some characters belong to both Factions), and within these Factions there are Sub-factions representing established Teams of Supremes. Sub-factions allow various bonuses through Actions, Skills and Team Powers. Sub-factions can generally readily mixed within any Team selection.

A Team comprises a number of Supremes as determined by the designated Encounter Level (as agreed between the players involved), and these Supremes are supported by Minions (a type of Resource) and can use Resources to add extra bonuses, benefits and Actions.

The abilities of individual Supremes are defined by Traits, Skills, Actions and Team Powers.

The rules were originally available as a free download and since November 2010 a print version (Pulp City Guide) became available.

== Gameplay ==
Like other tabletop wargames, players assemble (and paint) a combat force (Team) of several miniatures. As a skirmish wargame, only a relatively small number of miniatures are actually required to play, and the number of miniatures used is determined by an agreed-upon Encounter Level.

Players take turns to Activate models during the course of a Round. When a model is activated, Action Points (AP) are spent to carry out Exclusive Actions (unique to that model/Supreme) or Universal Actions.

The game resolves most Actions, and therefore effects, through an Opposed Roll. When making an Opposed Roll, both players roll d6 and add the relevant Trait. This roll can be further modified by using a Trump Roll (roll 2d6, and choosing the best for the Opposed Roll total), and/or by using a Power-Up die (costs 1 AP, uses one of a limited pool of Power-Up dice and adds d3 to the total).

== Rules and sourcebooks ==
Pulp City Guide, core rules and background (Pulp Monsters, 2010).
