= Armati: Rules and Lists for Ancient, Medieval & Renaissance Wargaming =

Armati: Rules and Lists for Ancient, Medieval & Renaissance Wargaming is a 1994 board game designed by Arty Conliffe.

== Gameplay ==
Armati: Rules and Lists for Ancient, Medieval & Renaissance Wargaming is a game in which the rules are straightforward, well-organized, and written in plain English. Armati offers an immersive look into ancient, medieval, and renaissance warfare and the drama of historical battles—from Macedonian phalanxes to Mongol cavalry.

== Publication history ==
Armati was designed by Arty Conliffe and published by Quantum Printing. Conliffe also wrote the Advanced Armati supplement.

== Reception ==
Pyramid magazine reviewed Armati and stated that "Armati is the opposite of everything non-miniatures players hate about miniatures rules. Armati is clean and concise. It can be picked up after a quick read-through. Its cover is bright and attractive. It's well laid-out with plenty of examples given. You don't have to spend hundreds of dollars on miniatures to field an army. You'll seldom run up against a rules lawyer. And the rules are written in English."
