= Future Fibre Technologies =

Australian company

- Type: Public
- Industry: Manufacturing
- Founded: 1994
- Headquarters: Melbourne, Australia
- Area served: Worldwide
- Website: www.fftsecurity.com

Future Fibre Technologies (FFT) is a fiber optic sensing technologies company based in Melbourne, Australia, with its US head office in Mountain View, California, Middle East head office in Dubai, Indian head office in New Delhi and European head office in London. Founded in 1994, Future Fibre Technologies product line provides optical fiber intrusion detection systems for perimeters, buried oil and gas pipelines and data communication networks.

FFT currently hold a number of patents for its fiber optic sensor and signal processing technologies, and is recognized as a global Tier One supplier in the Global Perimeter Intrusion Market.

FFT is listed on the Australian Securities Exchange (ASX: FFT).

== History ==
FFT was established in Melbourne, Australia in 1994 as a research and development company. In 1998, in response to the demand for cost-effective, optical fiber sensors to protect large perimeters, buried pipelines and physical network communication links, FFT developed technology that could pinpoint the location of intrusions over many miles of deployed optical fiber.

The first FFT products based on this new technology were commercialised in 2002, providing a fiber optic sensor intrusion detection system with the capacity to detect a perimeter intrusion to within 25 metres over up to 80 kilometres of deployed fiber optic cable on a single system.

Subsequently, FFT developed patented Advanced Recognition and Discrimination (ARaD) technology, which overcame the problem of nuisance alarms. Advanced artificial intelligence technology uses signature recognition and signal processing software to identify the difference between an environmental event and an attempted intrusion, reducing the effect of nuisance alarms.

This has led to hundreds of installations throughout the world, with notable installations for Unlimited Technologies Dulles International Airport, US Military JFPASS, and critical naval, infrastructure and airport site perimeters.
