= Warbots & Death Machines =

Warbots & Death Machines is a 1985 board game published by The Quartermaster.

== Gameplay ==
Warbots & Death Machines is a game in which players build custom fighting machines and battle using an extensive arsenal and detailed combat rules.

== Reviews ==
- Abyss #38 (Summer, 1986)
