= Reaper Miniatures =

- Company type: Incorporation (Inc.)
- Industry: Miniature wargaming manufacturer
- Founded: 1992
- Headquarters: Denton, Texas, United States
- Key people: Ed Pugh (President, CEO) (1958-2022), David Pugh.
- Website: Reapermini.com

Reaper Miniatures is an American manufacturer of pewter and plastic figurines in the 25–35 mm scale, which include fantasy and science fiction figures. Founded in 1992 by brothers Ed and David Pugh, the company was originally based in Fort Worth, then moved to Lewisville, and then to Denton, where it is based today. The company also has developed tabletop miniature game systems that may be played with their figures. The Reaper Miniatures mascot is a succubus named Sophie.

== History ==
Reaper Miniatures started in Fort Worth, Texas on July 4, 1992. Initially, two lines of miniatures were produced: Distinguished Flying Collectibles (a line of World War II aircraft) and Renaissance Dreams (a line of fantasy jewelry).

Reaper moved to Lewisville, Texas, in April 1993, and at this location they reactivated several old miniature lines that the company owned and combined them into the Dungeon Dweller 25 mm fantasy line.

Reaper saw further growth and need for expansion in August 1994, and moved into a 2,500-square-foot (230 m^{2}) warehouse in Lewisville. Late in 1994, they launched the Scrye Counter series of collectible card game accessories and over 500,000 have been sold worldwide. The Dark Heaven 25 mm fantasy line was launched in 1996, and is the top-selling fantasy role-playing game (RPG) miniature line in the world. Reaper has also expanded into the European market through a partnership with a miniatures company in England.

In July 1998, Reaper launched the CAV N-scale sci-fi line (Combat Assault Vehicle), Reaper Box Sets, Reaper Pro Paints, and Reaper Masters Series Paints. January 2004 saw Reaper move once again, to a new production facility in Denton, Texas.

The company has had five Bones Kickstarter campaigns. These have been used to launch and expand their lines of plastic miniatures in a new material. The first ended on August 26, 2012, with participants pledging over US$3 million, making it the third highest overall Kickstarter at the time. The second campaign also reached above $3 million and as of the end of 2013 both were among the ten highest Kickstarters ever. The third campaign was the shortest, running from July 7 to July 25, 2015. It raised $2.7 million dollars. The fifth began October 1, 2019 and will end October 31st.

Reaper also manufactures two acrylic water-based paint lines designed for painting the miniatures which they manufacture.

== Community and web presence ==
Reaper has an online community, from their online forum.

Reaper also maintains an on site research and development facility for their games called "The Asylum". The Asylum is open to the public and also serves as a sort of company store, offering not only Reaper products, but a wide area of family board games and various role-playing games.

== Miniature lines ==
=== Current miniature lines ===
As of 2013, Reaper has five major lines of miniatures and two minor lines:

- Dark Heaven Legends: Primarily aimed at fantasy role players. It contains many models designed for running role playing campaigns; from models to represent characters and monsters to familiars, weapons and accessories. This line provides the bulk of miniatures, which has now passed 3000 serial numbers.
- Warlord (miniature game): Reaper's highly successful skirmish game. Set in the fictional world of Taltos, ten factions fight in the provinces for control. Players battle across the world, and then log into the Reaper website to report wins and losses, thus allowing a dynamic, evolving world.
- Bones: Bones takes the most popular miniatures from the Dark Heaven Legends and Chronoscope lines and casts them in plastic along with many new designs, including some too large to produce in metal. "Ready to Paint" right out of the package, they are priced significantly less than more traditional metal miniatures. The Bones line has been funded by several successful Kickstarter crowdfunding campaigns.
- Combat Assault Vehicle (CAV): A game similar to BattleTech. Much like Warlord, players battle across the world and post results online as 10 fighting companies battle for dominance over 6 planets. CAV 2 is currently being developed.
- Chronoscope: A new line of non-fantasy pewter miniatures in the tradition of Dark Heaven Legends was released in 2008. The initial launch consisted of 8 miniatures including some science fiction pieces and a cowgirl. The line has since expanded to include additional genres, such as superheroes and espionage. The set also includes a handful of models based on historic figures such as Buffalo Bill Cody and classic literary characters such as Sherlock Holmes and Zorro.
- Reich of the Dead: A line of miniatures dedicated to a game of the same name that is currently in development. The game and miniature line both focus on an alternate World War II in which an Alien species called the Kroid possess and reanimate German casualties and battle American GIs.
- Master Series Miniatures: A line dedicated to larger scale or show-piece miniatures. Of the initial ten models in the series, eight have been issued in 54 mm scale.

=== Previous miniature lines ===
- Legendary Encounters was their line of non-random pre-painted plastics. The lineup was drawn from existing sculpts in the Dark Heaven line, with some sculpts from the Warlord line. It was introduced in 2007.
- P-65 Heavy Metal: A line featuring re-issued miniatures from previous Reaper product lines, particularly Dark Heaven Legends, cast in a 60% lead alloy. Production of this line ceased in February 2013.
- Legend of the Five Rings (L5R): Another miniature line directed at a specific role playing setting: the Rokugan setting. This has an Asian flair, with samurai and ninjas for characters and enemies. Reaper's license for L5R expired on October 31, 2005.
- Exalted: This line of miniatures was made specifically for White Wolf's Exalted RPG. Reaper's license to produce this line expired at the end of 2005, and it is no longer in production.

== Paint lines ==
Two paint lines are produced: Pro Paints, and the Masters Series.

== Reception ==
Scott Haring reviewed Reaper Miniatures for Pyramid #7 (May 1994) and stated that "In many ways, Reaper Miniatures is a throwback to the good old days of miniatures. No fancy four-color backing cards, foam packing and blister packs; Reaper's minis come in a small plastic bag with a red title card stapled over the top. But while the packaging may not be the best, the savings mean lower prices at the hobby shop."

== ReaperCon ==
Reaper miniatures hosts a yearly painting and gaming convention, known as Reapercon. It normally lasts 4 days over Labor Day Weekend, with painting classes and roleplaying games held each day, and the results of the painting competition delivered Saturday night. It started in Reaper's Denton factory but expanded several times. Since 2018 it has been held at the Embassy Suites by Hilton, Denton convention center. Except for 2020 when the physical convention was canceled and held virtually. The convention has always had a painting competition and the photos of entries since 2013 can be found online. Judging is based on comparing each submission to a standard and awarded a gold, silver, bronze medal, or certificate of merit. The best are judged against each other for trophies in the categories of Painting, Open (sculpting), Diorama, and Ordinance.
