= Monsters! (board game) =

1990 board game

Monsters! is a 1990 board game published by Dark Tower Enterprises.

== Gameplay ==
Monsters! is a game in which players become giant monsters rampaging through a city and battling each other using maps, character sheets, and stand‑up cardboard figures.

== Reviews ==
- Abyss Quarterly #50 (Winter, 1992)
