= 2,1-fructan:2,1-fructan 1-fructosyltransferase =

Class of enzymes

1,2-beta-fructan 1F-fructosyltransferase

Identifiers
- EC no.: 2.4.1.100
- CAS no.: 73379-55-2

Databases
- IntEnz: IntEnz view
- BRENDA: BRENDA entry
- ExPASy: NiceZyme view
- KEGG: KEGG entry
- MetaCyc: metabolic pathway
- PRIAM: profile
- PDB structures: RCSB PDB PDBe PDBsum
- Gene Ontology: AmiGO / QuickGO
Search
- PMC: articles
- PubMed: articles
- NCBI: proteins

In enzymology, a 2,1-fructan:2,1-fructan 1-fructosyltransferase (EC 2.4.1.100) is an enzyme that catalyzes the chemical reaction

[beta-D-fructosyl-(2->1)-]m + [beta-D-fructosyl-(2->1)-]n $\rightleftharpoons$ [beta-D-fructosyl-(2->1)-]m-1 + [beta-D-fructosyl-(2->1)-]n^{+}1

Thus, the two substrates of this enzyme are [[[beta-D-fructosyl-(2->1)-]]m]] and [[beta-D-fructosyl-(2->1)-]]n]], whereas its two products are [[beta-D-fructosyl-(2->1)-]]m-1]] and [[beta-D-fructosyl-(2->1)-]]n+1]].

This enzyme belongs to the family of glycosyltransferases, specifically the hexosyltransferases. The systematic name of this enzyme class is 2,1-beta-D-fructan:2,1-beta-D-fructan 1-beta-D-fructosyltransferase. Other names in common use include 1,2-beta-D-fructan 1F-fructosyltransferase, fructan:fructan fructosyl transferase, FFT, 1,2-beta-fructan 1F-fructosyltransferase, 1,2-beta-D-fructan:1,2-beta-D-fructan, 1F-beta-D-fructosyltransferase, and fructan:fructan 1-fructosyl transferase.
