= Burrows and Badgers =

Burrows and Badgers is an RPG style wargame produced by Osprey Games. Its characters are anthropomorphic animals.

== Gameplay ==
Burrows and Badgers is a skirmish style miniature wargame. Each character is played as an individual hero, meaning that no ranks of units or sorting is required. Instead of armies, each player has a group of such heroes, known as a warband. Players keep a log of the individual experience gained by all characters in their band.

== Characters and Classes ==
Players can have a variety of species fight in their warbands. The characters include rabbits, mice, badgers, snakes, shrews, and birds. The classes that characters can assume include wizards, barbarians and rogues.

== Release ==
The first edition of Burrows and Badgers was released in 2016. A second edition was published on April 17, 2018, by Osprey Games.
