= Warhammer Historical Wargames =

Warhammer Historical Wargames, also known as Warhammer Historical, was the publisher of Warhammer Ancient Battles and other game systems. It was an imprint from the BL Publishing division of Games Workshop. From a leaked email from Rob Broom, who was the director of Warhammer Historical, it appears that Warhammer Historical is now a property of Forge World and his position has become redundant. In November 2010, it was reported that Games Workshop had dissolved the Warhammer Historical corporate structure.

On 25 May 2012, Games Workshop closed Warhammer Historical as a publishing and distribution arm of the company. These games are no longer available to purchase new, and presumably, production of any new systems has also ceased.

== Game Systems ==
- Gladiator
- Hannibal
- Kampfgruppe Normandy
- Legends of the High Seas
- Legends of the Old West
- Richthofen's Flying Circus
- The Great War
- Trafalgar
- Warhammer Ancient Battles
- Warhammer English Civil War
- Warmaster Ancients
- Waterloo
