= Wyrd (company) =

US miniatures and games company

Wyrd Miniatures
- Company type: Limited liability company (LLC)
- Industry: Miniature wargaming manufacturer
- Founded: 2005
- Headquarters: 2197 Canton RD STE 108 Marietta, GA 30066, United States
- Key people: Nathan Caroland and Eric Johns
- Products: Malifaux; The Other Side; Through The Breach
- Website: www.wyrd-games.net

Wyrd Miniatures produces a range of 32 mm metal and plastic miniatures, in several genres, for painters and gamers. Established and offering its first miniatures in 2005, the company is owned by Nathan Caroland and Eric Johns.

The first years the company focused on casting miniatures for the wargaming and miniature painting market. According to Eric Johns, it started with Nathan putting together a few fun minis after having gotten friendly with a sculptor. It was only in 2007 he and Nathan decided to push forward as a real company and started developing their own game rules to go with their miniatures line.

After the release of Malifaux in 2009, which incorporated most of the miniature range, came a time of rapid expansion, and in March 2011 the company moved for the second time in 16 months allegedly to accommodate its growth, settling into a larger office and warehouse facility.

In 2012 the partnership with Ghost Studio led to Wyrd introducing a new line of plastic miniatures for Malifaux using an all-digital manufacturing workflow, the so-called Freeform 3D solution from Geomagic. According to Geomagic, their platform for designing organic shaped products can sculpt, texture or emboss products with detail and articulation that traditional geometric CAD solutions simply cannot handle.

== Games ==
=== Malifaux ===
In 2009, Wyrd published its first game, Malifaux, set in a dystopian city in a parallel world. Currently utilizing the Fourth Edition of its rule-set, this skirmish miniatures game sees two players fighting over control of the mysterious Malifaux City and its surrounding areas. With its introduction, Malifaux introduced the primarily conflict system used in many of Wyrd's products—The Fate Deck. Fate Decks are standard Poker Decks (54 cards, 13 cards of four suits, with two Jokers) that are used to determine the outcome of any conflicts within a game of Malifaux.

=== Through the Breach ===
Following a successful Kickstarter campaign in 2013, the tabletop role-playing game Through the Breach puts players into the world of Malifaux, the setting established by Wyrd's miniature games. Players, referred to as Fated, are guided through this world by a Fatemaster, fighting against the inhabitants of Malifaux in order to pursue their character's destiny. A second edition of the Core Rules for Through the Breach was published in 2017.

=== The Other Side ===
In 2017, once again using Kickstarter, Wyrd published its second miniatures game, The Other Side. Acting as a counterpart to Malifaux, The Other Side is a company-scale wargame, often pitting miniature armies of 40–50 combatants against each other in a fast-paced wargame. The game takes place within the same history as Malifaux, focusing on the conflicts of Earth and an alternate history 1908 where the world is tearing itself apart in war, fighting against amphibious hordes of monsters from the depths of an alien ocean and cultists worshiping a being of chaos floating through the skies of earth.

=== Other games ===
- Puppet Wars (2011)
- The World Needs a Jetpack Unicorn (2013)
- Showdown: Icons (2013)
- Kings of Artifice (2013)
- Darkness Comes Rattling (2015)
- Darkness Comes Rattling: War of the Spirits Expansion (2018)
- Bayou Bash (2021)
- Vagrantsong (2021)
