= Combat Assault Vehicle =

Miniatures wargame

Cover Art by Neil Nowatzki

CAV or Combat Assault Vehicle is a miniatures wargame by Reaper Miniatures.

== Story ==
Combat Assault Vehicle is named after the 30-foot-tall (9.1 m) war machines that walk the battlefields of the galaxy.

The Second Galaxy War began in 2274, following 11 years of relative peace among the galactic governments. Because of undisclosed diplomatic arrangement, military power struggle, the racial, religious and nationalistic governments across the galaxy have begun grabbing resources, nationalizing UCORs and mercenaries and folding everything into vast war machines capable of intergalactic domination and destruction.

== Game concepts ==
=== Reaper Adventure Game Engine ===
CAV combat and movement rules use the Reaper Adventure Game Engine (R.A.G.E.), a generic game system developed by Reaper for use with their miniatures wargames such as CAV and Warlord. This allows players to switch from game to game without having to learn a new combat and movement system for each game.

=== CAV Models ===
CAV models are all cast in N-Scale by Reaper Miniatures. Currently, there are around 100 different models available for the game, with prices starting around $8.00(US) and reaching $25.00(US).

The models cover the wide array of units available in the game, ranging from the namesake CAVs to aircraft, infantry, fighting vehicles, tanks, armored personnel carriers, support models and weapons packs.

When CAV was first released, all the aircraft and APC models were cast in 2/3 N-Scale to make them more affordable for customers. Thanks to numerous requests from the CAV community, Reaper has changed this practice and has begun to re-cast all aircraft and APC models in true N-Scale as of mid-2005. These new "true scale" models carry a different SKU from the old models, so gamers on a budget can still purchase the smaller, less expensive models. The old models are still legal for all CAV events.

=== Data Card ===
Dictator Data Card

Each model in the game has a set of ratings that dictate how well it performs in the game. These ratings are listed on a Data Card, which is an easy to read record sheet. CAV 2 Data Cards are the size of a standard playing card. All CAV Data Cards are available for free download from.

A key component of CAV, and all R.A.G.E. games, is the Damage Track. Each row of stats on the Data Card represents a Damage Track, or the total points of damage that the model can sustain before being destroyed and removed from play. When undamaged, you use all of the stats listed across the 0 Dmg row. If your model takes two points of damage, you use the stats on the 2 Dmg row. If your model has more points of damage than it has rows in the Dmg column, its destroyed.

=== Army building ===
Ritterlich Task Force painted by Jason Pape

When planning a game of CAV, the first thing that you must decide on is the Game Size. The Game Size is the number of points that each player will be allowed to spend on models for his army. Each model has its own corresponding Point Value. After choosing the models that you want to use for your Task Force, you total up their Point Values to determine your Army Size. Your Army Size must be equal to or less than the Game Size for it to be legal.

A Task Force is composed of several smaller groups of models called Sections. Each Section is made up of a number of models based on its type. Sections are separated into two categories: Primary and Secondary. No Task Force may have more Secondary Sections than it has Primary ones.

The different Section types are outlined below:

Primary sections

- Armor sections have 4-6 CAV or Vehicle models in them. At least 3 of the models must be Model Role: Attack.
- Mechanized Infantry sections have 4-8 Infantry models plus Transports to carry them.
- Rifle sections have 6-10 Infantry models.
- Specialist sections have 1-4 models of any type. They are the catchall of sections and each Task Force may only have one Specialist Section.

Secondary sections

- Fire Support sections have 4-6 CAV or Vehicle models, 3 of which must be Model Role: Fire Support.
- Flight sections consists of 2 Gunship models.
- Mortar platoons have 4-6 Infantry models with the Fire Support role and Transports to carry them.
- Recon sections have 4-6 CAV or Vehicle models with Model Role: Recon.
- Transport sections have 4-6 models with Model Role: Transport.

=== Game Play ===
CAV games are usually played on either a 4’x6’ or 4’x8’ area. 4’x4' areas are also acceptable for games 2,000 points or smaller. Each Task Force will have its own Deployment Zone; this is the area where all of a player's models begin the game. Each player's Deployment Zone is usually as far away from the other players’ as possible. In a game with two sides, this usually means opposite sides of the table. If there are multiple players or sides involved, the Zones are usually equally spread out around the table.

To determine when each player gets to take a turn, CAV utilizes an Initiative Deck. Using a standard set of playing cards, each player is assigned a color, suit or number, depending on the number of players involved. They are then given 1 card for each Section that they have in their Task Force. These cards are all combined to create the Initiative Deck, which now has one card for each Section in the game. The Initiative Deck is shuffled and the first card turned over. The player who “owns” that card gets to select one of his Sections to Activate.

When a Section is Activated, each model in the Section gets to perform two Actions. Actions come in two varieties: Repeatable and Non-Repeatable. Non-Repeatable Actions cover things like firing a model's weapons, performing special actions, initiating close combat or using a models electronics (ECM/Targeting). Each model may only perform a Non-Repeatable action once per turn. Repeatable Actions consist of things like moving, loading or unloading infantry from a transport and a model attempting to repair itself. Each model may perform the same Repeatable Action twice in the same turn.

The two basic mechanics of the game are Movement and Ranged Combat. Each model has a Mov rating on its Data Card that is the number of inches it can move when performing a Movement Action. So a model with a Mov of 12 could move up to 12” during its turn. Since Movement is a Repeatable Action, the model could perform two Movement Actions during its turn and move up to 24”. However a model's movement may be slightly altered by terrain on the battlefield. Items such as rough terrain, water, trees and hills can hinder a model, forcing it to pay additional movement costs.

Ranged Combat deals with four primary stats in CAV: # of Attacks (#DA or #IA), Ranged Attack Value (RAV), Range (Rng) and Defensive Value (DV). First off, there are two different types of Ranged Attacks: Direct Attacks (DA) and Indirect Attacks (IA). Direct Attacks may only be performed in there is an un-interrupted Line Of Sight between the acting model and its target. Indirect Attacks may be performed against any target, regardless of Line Of Sight. All weapon systems in CAV are designated as either DA or IA and may only be used to perform those types of attacks.

The basics of resolving an attack are:

- Declare which of your models is attacking, the type of attack it is using (DA or IA) and its target.
- Roll 1d10 and add your model's RAV to the die roll
- Subtract any modifiers the target might have for range or cover
- If your modified roll is equal to or greater than the target's DV, you inflict a point of damage.

CAV also has a mechanic for Critical Hits, which can inflict multiple points of damage.

After all of the models in the active Section have performed their attacks, any enemy models that were attacked get a chance to perform Defensive Fire. The Defensive Fire mechanic represents the level of automation and advanced technology that exists in the CAV game world. Each time a model is attacked, its on-board computer automatically retaliates by firing back at its attacker. In game terms, when a model is the target of one or more Ranged Attacks during an enemy Section's Activation phase, it gets to perform one Defensive Shot. The player who controls the targeted model gets to choose one of the attacking models to be the target of his Defensive Shot. The model may only perform one Defensive Shot per Activation, regardless of how many models attacked it or how many Ranged Attacks were performed against it. However Defensive Fire is triggered by the simple act of declaring a Ranged Attack against a model, so even if the attacks do no damage, the target model still gets to perform his Defensive Shot.

If any models ever sustain more points of damage than they have Damage Tracks, they are destroyed. Destroyed models may be replaced with counters to represent their location or simply laid on their side.

Once all of the models in the active Section are finished with their Actions, their turn is over. The next card in the Initiative Deck is turned over and the “owner” of the next card gets to activate one of his Sections. When all of the cards in the deck have been flipped over, the current Turn is over. If any Sections were removed from the game by either being totally destroyed or by Regrouping with another partially destroyed Section, those Sections' cards are removed from the Initiative Deck. The ratio of Initiative Cards to Sections should always be 1:1 at the beginning of a turn.

== See also ==
- Wargaming
- Reaper Miniatures
- R.A.G.E.
