= The Hunt: The Ultimate Arena Sport =

The Hunt: The Ultimate Arena Sport is a 1991 board game published by Maverick Games Co.

== Gameplay ==
The Hunt: The Ultimate Arena Sport is a game in which a brutal miniatures game has players portray televised Hunters competing in a deadly maze to track, kill, and outscore criminal Prey and the dangerous Fox for winner‑take‑all glory.

== Reviews ==
- Abyss Quarterly #50 (Winter, 1992)
