= Critter Commandos =

1989 miniatures wargame

Critter Commandos is a miniatures wargame involving battling cartoon characters that was published by Crunchy Frog Enterprises in 1989.

== Description ==
Critter Commandos is a miniatures wargame of combats between cartoon characters, featuring weapons such as glue guns, rubber mallets and pies, and equipment such as jet packs, giant banana peels and tricycles.

The original rules were written by Paul Arden Lidberg and published in 1989. A revised and expanded version with more cartoon characters, and role-playing rules for individual characters was released in 1991.

=== Links to other games ===
In the October–November 1989 edition of Space Gamer (Issue 87), the creator of Critter Commandos, Paul Lidberg, published a system to convert Warhammer 40K to the Critter Commandos rules system.

== Reception ==
In the May 1993 edition of Dragon (Issue #193), Lester W. Smith called Critter Commandos "a rather strange game" but he recommended it, saying, "Overall, it's a nice package at a reasonable price. Even if you haven’t been hankering to run mobs of crazed gorillas with cream pies against giant robots, this game may give you that desire. And in any event, it's a good read."

In his 1990 book The Complete Guide to Role-Playing Games, game critic Rick Swan liked the game, commenting "What makes Critter Commandos so much fun are its cartoon elements." However Swan felt the game was too combat-oriented at the expense of role-playing, saying, "The [role-playing] material is far too underdeveloped to be of much use for role-playing adventures, though ambitious referees might be able to do something with it." Swan concluded by giving the game a rating of 3 out of 4.
