= Flashpoint! =

Flashpoint! is a 1994 game published by Virtual Fusion Publishing.

== Gameplay ==
Flashpoint! is a game in which squad-level combat plays using 23rd century corporate guilds.

== Reception ==
Denys Bakriges reviewed Flashpoint! in White Wolf Inphobia #50 (Dec., 1994), rating it a 4 out of 5 and stated that "Warhammer 40K may have more atmosphere, but at what cost? Flashpoint! offers a complete miniatures game. It's professionally done and thoroughly enjoyable. If you're deciding on a sci-fi skirmish game, there are two words of advice: buy American."

== Reviews ==
- Shadis #16
