= Brother Against Brother =

Brother Against Brother is a popular set of rules for miniature wargaming, recreating small skirmishes primarily of the American Civil War, as well as the French and Indian War and similar time periods. First written by Ivor M. Janci in 1996 for the Civil War, the rules were republished in 1997 by H.G. Walls, who expanded them to include F&I conflicts, artillery, and other enhancements.

The rules are for company-level fights, with each player commanding at least a squadron or similar small group of 9-10 soldiers. Each miniature figure represents 1 combatant within the squad, led by a Sergeant or similar non-commissioned officer. Multiple squads (usually 4 or 5 in number) are commanded by a Company Officer such as a lieutenant or captain.

The 44-page rules cover infantry, cavalry, and artillery. Play is based upon initiative, and standard playing cards randomly determine which groups are activated when during each game turn. Each figurine may take one individual action per turn—fire, load (certain weapons require loading before firing), move, charge. Being outside of a Sergeant's command radius limits a soldier's actions; and soldiers can charge only if directly ordered to do so by a Company Officer. Taking casualties or charging requires a group to draw one of 19 Morale Cards, often causing 'skeedaddling' (stragglers), out of ammunition conditions, or other consequences. Optional rules cover troop quality, special event cards, types of fire, and allow leaders to be "personalized."

Each game typically lasts 3-4 hours. One infantry/cavalry figurine represents 1-2 men. The ground scale is 1" = 5 yards. One Action Phase represents 1-3 minutes.
