= Mecha Carnage =

Mecha Carnage is a 1996 miniatures wargame published by Gomi Designs.

== Gameplay ==
Mecha Carnage is a game in which a miniatures wargame offers mechanics for anime-style robot combat at 1/300th and 1/295th scale. The rules are divided into core chapters covering construction, movement, and combat, with additional appendices exploring system upgrades, campaign design, and large-scale units. The game features a points-based system tied to tech level and size. The book includes a cardstock quick-reference sheet and counters for immediate play. It provides newcomers with a curated list of viewing inspirations. Mecha Carnage includes ready-made units and weapon options to ease setup.

== Reception ==
Jim Swallow reviewed Mecha Carnage for Arcane magazine, rating it a 6 out of 10 overall, and stated that "There are some nice ideas and spins that only a long-time gamer might think of in the text, and while a few glitches and omissions do show up here and there - the rules for mecha transformations into submarine varieties, for instance - by and large Mecha Carnage does its job neatly and with a minimum of fuss."
