= Warmaster =

Tabletop wargame ruleset

- The Warmaster rulebook.
- Manufacturers: Games Workshop
- Publishers: Games Workshop
- Players: 2+
- Setup time: 4–10 minutes
- Playing time: 45-150 minutes, depending on rules version
- Chance: Low (Dice)
- Age range: 10+
- Skills: Strategy, Probability
- Website: GW Website

Warmaster is a ruleset for tabletop wargames written by Rick Priestley, published by Specialist Games (a division of Games Workshop), and set in the Warhammer Fantasy setting. It is different from Warhammer Fantasy Battles in both appearance and gameplay. It is intended for 10 –12 mm miniatures. Basic troops are based on stands, of which typically three make a unit. Generals, Heroes and Wizards are mounted individually or with their retinue.

Gameplay focuses on command and control. While magic is used in the game, its effect on the game is limited. The game is designed to focus on the general's ability to command rather than just his army's ability to fight.

In the Warhammer 40,000 universe, Epic fills much the same "large scale battle" role as Warmaster does in Warhammer Fantasy, though the two systems do not share rules, and Epic is intended for slightly smaller 6 mm miniatures.

== Releases ==
The original version, the fantasy ruleset Warmaster, was first released in 2000. As with most of the "specialist" games products, the support strategy from Games Workshop has evolved over time. Once a part of the Specialist Games division, Warmaster was then directly supported by Games Workshop itself, albeit at a reduced level. In 2013 Games Workshop stopped producing the miniatures and started to remove them from their webstore as stocks ran out. A freely downloadable "Living Rulebook", along with supplements and archived magazine articles, are available through the fan-administered site Specialist Games.

In mid-2006, a new online supplement was added to the Specialist Games website, known as Warmaster Armies. This supplement includes slightly revised lists for the six original armies (High Elves, Empire, Dwarfs, Chaos, Orcs and Goblins, and Tomb Kings of Khemri), alongside new lists for eight forces (Dark Elves, Skaven, Bretonnians, Lizardmen, Kislevites, Vampire Counts, Daemonic Hordes, and Araby).

This was followed in 2009 by a fan-based supplement release. This included a large number of alternative, trial or fan designed army lists. The Warmuster publication aimed to promote ongoing development of the game but has since been superseded and refined (see below for Warmaster Revolution).

In 2010 Warmaster 2nd Edition was released, which compiled and clarified the siege rules written for the game over the preceding 10 years.

Since 2017 a revamped ruleset was released by the Warmaster community called Warmaster Revolution. Bringing together elements of Warmaster Ancients and some extra 'house rules', Warmaster Revolution has quickly established itself as the ruleset of choice for Warmaster players. Its release coincided with a marked upturn of interest with the game, due in no small part to the launch of Warmaster Podcast in 2016. With a growing FB community, YouTube videos and more tournaments globally, Warmaster is experiencing a renaissance with an expanding base of new converts and returning players. The new ruleset incorporates many of the 2009 supplement army lists but has a working committee that looks to refine the lists to make them balanced and playable as well as tweak current army lists.

=== Battle of Five Armies ===
Contents of Game.

In 2005 Games Workshop released a boxed game called Great Battles of Middle Earth: The Battle of Five Armies based on the battle from the book "The Hobbit". The rules are heavily based on Warmaster, and it uses the same miniature scale. The boxed set contains rules, 10 mm plastic miniatures, and scenery (plastic hills, ruins and a cardboard river).

Additional miniatures for this game were cast in white metal. While detailed in the box set rule book, these extra miniatures were sold separately. They were discontinued shortly after being released. The box set remained in print for a longer while. It was removed before the launch of the 28 mm line based on the movie "The Hobbit: An Unexpected Journey".

=== Warmaster Ancients ===
The Warmaster Ancients rulebook.

Also in 2005 Warhammer Historical published Warmaster Ancients, a modified version of the Fantasy rules suitable for battles covering a period from early Biblical times to 1066. The rules are different from the original 'fantasy' version to better represent historical battles and units. Cavalry, for example, was made weaker in relation to infantry in favour of armies such as the Romans and the Norse.

October 2006 saw the release of Warmaster Ancient Armies, which includes 20 new army lists (all of which are set prior to 1000 AD), along with rules for campaign play and a number of new rule clarifications and unit modifications. The campaign rules have been described as a good way of linking battles, but are not suitable for historical campaigns.

A new supplement for a later period, Warmaster Medieval Armies was released in December 2008. This supplemental book contains 30 new army lists and a number of significant rule changes from the Fantasy and Ancients version. Knights are introduced as a powerful unit shifting the game balance back towards cavalry, like in the original, Fantasy version. Special rules are provided for sieges, period equipment, and larger command elements called batailles.

== Warmaster Gameplay ==
Warmaster works at a higher organisation level than Warhammer Fantasy to represent very large battles in the Warhammer world. The components of an army are divided into two basic types: units and characters. In the original 10 mm Games Workshop-produced miniatures, figures are cast 6 men to a strip, though many gamers base their miniatures with other maker's figures to produce 4-12 figure-per-base bases in order to create a variety of mass effects. Standard bases for Warmaster Ancients are 40 mm x 20 mm elements. Units are normally made of three such elements each. Infantry are based along the 40 mm edge, while cavalry, chariots, monsters and artillery are based along the 20 mm edge. Characters represent commanders such as generals, heroes and wizards and may be based as the player desires, generally on round diorama-sculpted coins or 40 or 20mm wide bases in order for them to be included directly in combat alongside the troops.

Gameplay proceeds with the rolling of dice. Units in Warmaster must be activated and moved by rolling against the command value of a character; units can be activated multiple times, though the roll becomes progressively more difficult. If a commander fails his activation roll, he can no longer command units in that turn. Units may be moved into contact with enemy troops and are considered charging. To enable commanders to move their armies around, units can be formed into brigades of up to four units.

Once all units have been moved eligible units are allowed to shoot and wizards may attempt to cast a spell. Shooting is not very deadly, but any hits scored may force an enemy unit to fall back and cost the player further command rolls to draw back into combat. Shooting is therefore primarily aimed at disrupting enemy formation and cohesion rather than destroy them.

After the shooting phase follows the combat phase, all units involved in combat may roll a number of six-sided dice equivalent to their attack value. Units based along the 20 mm edge have a tremendous advantage against units based on the 40 mm edge, allowing them to pack all their attacks in a narrow frontage, with two units being able to combine their attacks onto a single enemy unit. Once two units have exchanged blows the number of hits are totalled. The loser with the lowest total hits is forced to fall back, while the winner has the option to stand, pursue or fall back. Fights may continue, even against multiple enemy units in succession, until one side is destroyed or the attacker does not wish to pursue the enemy.

== Warmaster Ancients gameplay ==
Even before Warmaster Ancients were published, there had been attempts to use the fantasy rules for purely historical armies. However, they had significant drawbacks – cavalry under the fantasy rules were too powerful, skirmishers too weak and some historical troop types were not catered for at all.

The gameplay for Warmaster Ancients follows the same basic procedure as Warmaster Fantasy, but differs in the following way:

- Magic, dragons and other such are naturally not present in this rule set (although historical large creatures, such as elephants, are present in some armies).
- Units may only receive three consecutive orders.
- Combat is limited to two exchanges, unlike the fantasy version, where units may continue to attack as long as they have valid targets in range. This allows players to reinforce their troops under attack.
- There are special rules for many historical unit types. Units based on the 20 mm edge are designated as "shock troops" and include heavy cavalry, elephants and phalanges using pikes – their greater hitting power is offset by their shorter frontage which opens them to outflanking. Among the most important new troop types are skirmishers, mobile light troops that can evade an enemy charge and can be used to delay an enemy advance.

== Spin-offs for other periods ==
Quite a few rulesets have been written using the basic Warmaster mechanics.

- Battle of the Five Armies - covering the conflicts from Tolkien's Middle Earth.
- Warmaster Ancients - covering ancient and Dark Ages historical periods.
- Warmaster Medieval - covering the medieval period.
- Blitzkrieg Commander - covering World War II
- Cold War Commander - covering post-war to modern periods (derived from Blitzkrieg Commander).
- Future War Commander - covering near-future and sci-fi (derived from Blitzkrieg Commander).

== Reviews ==
Warmaster was reviewed in Backstab magazine #21
