= Malifaux =

Tabletop wargame

- Manufacturers: Wyrd Miniatures
- Years active: 2009 to present
- Players: 2+
- Playing time: 2–5 hours
- Chance: Deck of cards used for task resolution
- Website: www.wyrd-games.net/malifaux/

Malifaux is a skirmish-level miniatures wargame created by Wyrd Miniatures in 2009 that simulates gang warfare in the ruins of the eponymous city of Malifaux and its surrounding wilderness. The publisher has created several expansions for the game through four editions.

== Description ==
Malifaux is a tabletop miniatures wargame for two players set in the ruined city of Malifaux, now inhabited by gangs and monsters. The setting is Victorian horror steampunk. The game box includes instructions, miniatures, terrain tiles that can be glued together to form battle maps, character cards and a "Fate Deck". In lieu of dice, the game uses cards from the Fate Deck to generate random numbers. Various game mechanics allow players to manipulate its results.

Each player constructs a team of characters, all of whom have, in addition to standard combat and movement abilities, special powers. At the start of the combat, each player is given a random objective for the game, such as assassinating the opposing team leader or controlling certain portions of the game map.

Each player alternates activating one of their characters, using movement, combat and special powers to inflict damage on opposing characters.

== Publication history ==
Malifaux was designed by Nathan Caroland, Eric Johns, and Dan Weber and released at Gen Con in August 2009 by Wyrd Games, with cover art by Melvin de Voor.

The game proved popular and Wyrd Games quickly published expansions with more characters and miniatures, including Rising Powers (2010) and Twisting Fates (2011).

In 2013, Wyrd Games released a second edition of the game, followed by a third edition in 2019, and a fourth in 2025.

For their 3rd Edition, Wyrd Games collaborated with developer Damien Zeke Liergard to create and support their gaming app called Malifaux Crew Builder. It allows users to manage their games while referencing all the characters and associated rules.

The open beta of Malifaux 4e was announced in April 2025 with the objective of making the game faster to play, taking two hours rather than three or four.

== Reception ==
In Issue 16 of the French games magazine Blogurizine, Marvin Le Rouge noted, "Since its release in 2009, Malifaux has managed to establish itself and persist in the difficult skirmish game sector. A fantastic western universe, quality figurines and a solid game system have brought many players on board. And this despite some complicated rules that may seem difficult at first; the game is nevertheless worth the effort." After lengthy examinations of seven of the expansions for the game, Le Rouge pointed out that Wyrd Games was switching from metal or plastic miniatures: "The most significant is the abandonment of metal figurines. Ever-increasing costs have forced Wyrd to enter into a process of reflection in order to find another solution, and this is the use of plastic. However true to spirit, Wyrd made sure to find the best possible technology so as not to lose too much quality. The results obtained are encouraging: the plastic is rigid, the poses remain dynamic and the inevitable loss of details is most acceptable."

In Issue 19 of The Ancible, Robey Jenkins thought that what set Malifaux apart was three qualities. The first: "its innovative random number generating mechanics." The second: "its use of named characters. Malifaux doesn't use named characters as simply colour elements on the battlefield, but effectively implements them as complex building blocks that must be fitted together to give the perfect combination." And the third: "combinations. Whoever initiates their combo first usually wins."

In their 2016 book Tabletop Wargames : A Designers' and Writers' Handbook, Rick Priestley and John Lambshead used Malifaux as an example of game using "the technique of highly characterised models [exporting] complex and detailed rules about individual characters out of the core rules and onto cards, which are placed onto the tabletop in front of players to be consulted as and when they are needed."

In a review for Dicebreaker, Michael Whelan wrote that "Malifaux is incredibly evocative and comes with some interesting new takes on the miniature wargaming formula" but noted that "the small and quite finicky models can be absolute hell to put together."

== Publications ==
=== First Edition ===
- Malifaux
- Rising Powers
- Twisting Fates
- Storm of Shadows

=== Second Edition ===
- Malifaux 2E
- Crossroads
- Shifting Loyalties
- Ripples of Fate
- Broken Promises

=== Third Edition ===
- Malifaux 3rd Edition - Core Rulebook
- Guild
- Resurrectionists
- Arcanists
- Neverborn
- Outcasts
- Bayou
- Ten Thunders
- Explorer's Society
- Malifaux Burns
- Madness of Malifaux
- Ashes of Malifaux
