= Warheads: Medieval Tales =

Role-playing game

- Designers: Mark Brendan, John Robertson
- Illustrators: Stuart Beel, Nick Sawyer, Debbie Keys
- Publishers: Urban Mammoth, Scotia Grendel
- Players: 2+
- Age range: 14+
- Website: Home page

Warheads: Medieval Tales is a tabletop medieval wargame produced by Urban Mammoth.

The game is played with 28mm white metal miniatures, manufactured by Urban Mammoth and representing fantasy characters from the bimonthly Warheads: Medieval Tales magazine. Each issue of the magazine builds upon the rule base, provides new scenarios and expands the comical narrative, which is set in medieval Britain shortly after the Norman invasion. Warheads: Medieval Tales has an unusual, super deformed anime style and the fiction is in a humorous and irreverent style inspired by T. H. White.

In 2015, the property was acquired by Scotia Grendel.

== Fiction ==
The fiction for the game has an historical context, taking place in and around the area known as the Welsh Marches in the late 11th century. It tells the story of a feud between the two central playable characters, Sir Hugo of Deangard and his half brother Gui le Bȃtard. History and fantasy are blended in terms of locations, characters who appear throughout the narrative and the enemies that are encountered.

== Gameplay ==
The core gameplay is a blend of pen and paper fantasy role playing and miniatures based tabletop wargaming. The game is presented as a strongly character and narrative driven episodic campaign, in which the characters fight set piece battles against each other and earn experience points which can be used to improve their core stats and skills. Treasure and money can also be earned to improve their equipment.

Issue 1 introduces the basic gameplay concepts such as movement and combat. Central to the gameplay mechanic in Warheads: Medieval Tales is a test table which is used any time a character has to perform an action or determine the outcome of an event. In one axis of the test table is the POWER value and in the other is the RESISTANCE value, and by cross referencing these values, a player finds out how many standard six-sided dice to roll. How the power and resistance values are determined varies depending on the situation, but in general they are composed of the core stats of characters involved in the test, and any equipment or powers being used, and in some cases the difficulty of the action being attempted. Each die roll that scores 4 or more is considered a success (so in this way success is generally measured in degrees rather than being a binary success/failure result—though not in all cases). Dice rolls are modified by environmental factors and the skills of the characters involved, and as a consequence of these open-ended modifiers, dice rolls of 1 are always considered to be failures and dice rolls of 6 are always successes, regardless of modifiers. Each successful die roll made by a character earns it a point of experience (or XP). XP is also earned by achieving specific objectives in the set piece battles.

The rules are presented as an ongoing tutorial, so following on from the rules learned in issue 1, each new issue introduces new characters with new abilities, new situations, and new rules to accompany them.

== Releases ==
Warheads: Medieval Tales was first published in June 2010. All the issues published so far are available as free pdf downloads at from the Warheads: Medieval Tales website, though paper copies are also available through retail outlets. Warheads: Medieval Tales is expected to run for six issues.

- Warheads: Medieval Tales Issue 1 - June 2010 - Introduces the main characters of Sir Hugo of Deangard and Gui le Bȃtard and their starting followers. The narrative also covers the back story for the campaign and the lead up to the three battles contained in the issue. Issue 1 contains the core rules for playing the game and some advanced rules, including movement, combat, spending experience points and prayers (which result in divine intervention on the battlefield). The miniature boxed sets to accompany this issue are Hugo’s Heroes and Gui’s Gits.
- Warheads: Medieval Tales Issue 2 - August 2010 - In issue 2 the narrative moves on to Dunswold, the manor of Sir Hugo’s follower, Sir Penhaligon, for a grand tournament in the king’s honour for Christmas week. In this issue several new characters are introduced that Sir Hugo and Gui can add to their parties. There are no battles per se in this issue, but rather a variety of medieval tournament based mini-games in which the characters can compete, such as jousting and single combats, with a grand melee to close the tournament. The final encounter is a royal hunt with rabbits, wild boars and a great hart as the quarry. New rules in this issue include critical damage and character death, equipment repair and upkeep between missions. The miniature boxed sets to accompany this issue are Jolly Jousters and Tourney Tyrants.
- Warheads: Medieval Tales Issue 3 - November 2010 - Issue 3 takes the campaign deep into the Forest of Dean, where both parties encounter and fight bandits, and culminates in a three-way fight in which Hugo and Gui face the first truly supernatural foes in Warheads in the form of Slithy Toves and the Jabberwock (drawn from Lewis Carroll’s poem Jabberwocky). Again, there are several new characters that can be added to the parties, and new rules include using birds of prey in combat with falconry skill, herbalism, poisons, poaching and chirurgery (surgery). The miniature boxed sets to accompany this issue are Bolshy Bandits and Odious Outlaws.
- Warheads: Medieval Tales Issue 4 - July 2011 - Issue 4 takes the campaign into the Medieval Village of Much Stoatley. It adds options to the campaign for characters to work for income, for the effects of alcoholic drinks, and for allies to temporarily join the campaign. It also includes rules for character abilities berserking and fateweaving.
- Warheads: Medieval Tales Issue 5 - TBC
- Warheads: Medieval Tales Issue 6 - TBC

== Other media ==
A free-to-play video game based on the Warheads license was programmed by DNA Interactive and published by Glu Distribution for Apple and Android-based phones in 2012.

== Reception ==
Industry reception to Warheads: Medieval Tales has been cautious but mainly positive and the line is now distributed in a number of countries including the UK, USA, Australia, France, Germany, Spain and Hungary. Translations of the magazines are now also being planned in French, Spanish and German.

Critical reception to Warheads: Medieval Tales is limited but at this stage is generally positive.

Consumer reaction to the unique miniature style has been mixed. Whilst many consumers have enjoyed the fresh approach to miniature war gaming, some have commented that the range's style is a little too similar to bobblehead style toys. Other consumers have commented that they would like to have seen the miniatures in plastic and pre-painted to suit younger audiences. Further consumers have commented that they would like to see actual photographs of the painted metal miniatures as opposed to the computer renditions currently on the website.
