= Blood & Plunder =

2016 Miniature wargame

- Designers: Michael Tuñez
- Publishers: Firelock Games
- Publication: 2016; 10 years ago
- Genres: Miniature wargame
- Players: 2
- Playing time: 60–90 minutes
- Age range: 12+

Blood & Plunder is a miniature wargame designed by Michael Tuñez, and first published in 2016 by Firelock Games. Two players control sides in a historical conflict set during the Golden Age of Piracy, fighting to eliminate their opponent's commander or side's morale through tactical movement of units through a miniature terrain.

== Publishing history ==
Following a successful Kickstarter which raised $215,594, Blood & Plunder was first published by Firelock Games in December 2016. Pirate historian Benerson Little was consulted about the game in order to ensure its historical accuracy. Following this, Firelock Games released the expansions Blood & Plunder: No Peace Beyond the Line in 2018, and Blood & Plunder: Fire on the Frontier in early 2022.

Firelock Games launched the Kickstarter for Blood & Plunder: Raise the Black in October 2020, but release was delayed due to late 2022 the COVID-19 pandemic. Blood & Plunder: Raise the Black is a starter kit recreating the final battle between Blackbeard and Robert Maynard, and featuring miniatures at the 28mm scale.

== Gameplay ==
Blood & Plunder is played on a terrain map and each player receives a model ship, a crew of miniatures, a commander miniature, marking tokens, and an Activation Deck. Each round, players draw a cards from their Activation Deck equal to the number of units they control, and choose cards to assign to each unit. Order of play of the units is determined by card suit. Actions, such as moving, rallying, pushing, melee, shooting, and reloading, can be taken in any order but the number of actions a unit takes must sum to the number listed on the card, which is determined by the piece's level of experience (Experienced, Trained, of Veteran). Both commanders gains Command Points at the start of each round, which they can spend to give units additional actions.

A d10 is rolled for each attacking unit, which must be greater than or equal to the defending unit's attack score in order to hit; on successful hits, the defending player rolls a saving throw to see if they lose a miniature from that unit. The defender then takes Resolve Tests based on number of casualties and gains a Fatigue Point on a failure. Units also gain Fatigue Points by pushing, and these points negatively affect their ability to act proportional to the amount it has, with the unit being destroyed if it acquires seven points. Players receive a Strike Point if they take casualties or the other player completes a scenario-specific victory condition, and must take a Strike Test of their commander's morale if they ever have two more Strike points than their opponent. A player loses if they fail a Strike Test or if their commander dies.

== Reception ==
The game was nominated for the Miniatures category of the 2018 Origins Awards. In a brief review for IGN, Charlie Theel and Matt Thrower praised the game for its cinematic, yet historical accurate gameplay, concluding that the "details add a sharp texture to play and help anchor the experience to its rich Caribbean setting." Chris King, writing for Wargames Soldiers & Strategy Magazine, praised the "well-organized, helpfully unambiguous, clearly indexed, and beautifully presented" rules, intuitive mechanics, and variety of model pieces.
