= Occult Wars =

Tabletop war game

Occult Wars cover

Occult Wars is a tabletop skirmish war game designed by Stealthy Spider Publishing. Players represent rival gangs, clans, or packs of humans, vampires, werewolves, angels, zombies, demons, and other similar creatures. Also included are rules for making mixed gangs consisting of, for example, humans and werewolves.

The game rules include methods for designing creatures with different types of strengths and weaknesses. For example, players can create vampires that are invulnerable to sunlight and crucifixes, but have weaknesses to electricity and gold. The rules also include a system for character advancement, similar to those of many role-playing games, allowing players to create campaigns linking together multiple games.

According to the publishers, Occult Wars is recommended for people aged 14 years and older.
