= Shockforce: Battles in the Remnants of America =

Tabletop game

Shockforce: Battles in the Remnants of America is a miniatures game published by Demonblade Games in 1998.

== Contents ==
Shockforce: Battles in the Remnants of America is a wargame using miniatures.

== Reception ==
The reviewer from the online second volume of Pyramid stated that "The line was originally built upon pieces commissioned but not paid for by Grenadier, but since has been expanded to great effect. Each month's releases have been getting better and better, and I think we can expect great things from Demonblade in the near future."

== Reviews ==
- Shadis #48 (June, 1998)
- Backstab #9
