= OHMU War Machine =

OHMU War Machine is a 1992 game published by TBA Games.

== Gameplay ==
OHMU War Machine is a game in which battalion and regimental level encounters are conducted using Oversized Heavy Mechanized Units.

== Reception ==
Robert DeVoe reviewed OHMU War Machine in White Wolf #48 (Oct., 1994), rating it a 3.5 out of 5 and stated that "This would be a great system for people who already have an interest in tabletop warfare, or for a group whose members wish to pool their money. This would be a great game for tournaments."

== Reviews ==
- Mecha Press #13
