= Sam A. Mustafa =

American author and historian (born 1965)

Sam Ali Mustafa (born 1965) is an American author and historian, and professor of history in the School of Humanities and Global Studies at Ramapo College of New Jersey. He earned a B.S. at Virginia Commonwealth University, an M.A. at the University of Richmond and a Ph.D. at the University of Tennessee. Mustafa specializes in German history, the Napoleonic era, military history, and historiography.

He is also the founder of Sam Mustafa Publishing, which produces historical games such as the Honour series, Lasalle, Might and Reason, and Grande Armée.

== Scholarly and academic publications ==
=== Books ===
- Napoleon's Paper Kingdom: The Life and Death of Westphalia, 1807-13. Rowman & Littlefield, 2017.
- Germany in the Modern World: A New History (Second Edition). Rowman & Littlefield, 2016.
- Germany in the Modern World: A New History. Rowman & Littlefield, 2011.
- The Long Ride of Major von Schill: A Journey Through German History and Memory. Rowman & Littlefield, 2008.
- Merchants and Migrations: Germans and Americans in Connection, 1776-1835. London: Ashgate Press, 2001.

=== Articles ===
- "The Plunder State: French Confiscations in Germany, 1807-1813." Journal of the International Napoleonic Society Vol. 1, No. 7 (December 2016).
- "Loyal Rebels and Unruly Prussians: Two Centuries of the Napoleonic Wars in German School History Texts." Internationale Schulbuchforschung (The Journal of International Textbook Research), Vol. 30 (Spring 2008).
- "The Politics of Memory: Rededicating Two Historical Monuments in Postwar Germany." Central European History, Vol. 41, No.2 (June 2008).
- "The Long Ride of Major von Schill: A Historiographic Re-Assessment of Schill’s Rebellion." Proceedings of the Consortium on Revolutionary Europe (2004).
- "Merchant Culture in Germany and America in the Late 18th Century." The Yearbook of German-American Studies, Volume 34 (2000).
- "Arnold Delius and the Hanseatic 'Discovery' of America." German History, Volume 18, No. 1 (Winter 1999).
- "The Role of the Hanseatic Cities in Early US-German Relations." Maryland Historical Magazine, (Fall 1998).

== Games from Sam Mustafa Publishing ==
- Eisenhower
- Nimitz
- Rommel (2017)
- Freejumper (2016)
- Blücher (2015)
- Aurelian (2015)
- Longstreet (2013)
- Maurice (2012)
- Lasalle (2009)
- Might and Reason (2007)
- Grande Armée (2003)
