= BlitzkriegCommander =

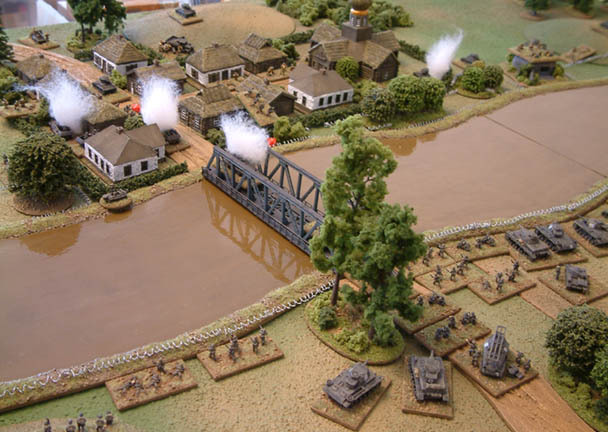
A game in action. This details a combined Italo-German river crossing in Russia, late 1941. The miniatures are N scale (the figures are approximately 12 mm high) from Miniature Figurines, the buildings are from Musket Miniatures.

BlitzkriegCommander is a tabletop wargame designed to re-create battles of the Second World War and the Spanish Civil War using miniatures. Originally published by Specialist Military Publishing, the rules were purchased by Pendraken Miniatures in 2015, along with Cold War Commander and Future War Commander.

== BlitzkriegCommander game play ==
Players can command units ranging from a company up to a division. For Blitzkrieg Commander III, this was standardised to one unit = one platoon. A typical game lasts 2 or 3 hours.

BlitzkriegCommander is derived from the Warmaster family of rules and uses activation rolls to simulate command and control. Commanders can activate a single unit (or group of units) multiple times in a single turn, but each attempt is at an increasing penalty. This compels players to weigh carefully the risk and reward of each decision (e.g., should I move into firing position—which exposes my unit to fire if I fail the next activation roll—or should I wait in cover?).

Combat is resolved with one or two dice rolls, but differs from Warmaster and Warmaster Ancients in that combat is most often ranged.

BlitzkriegCommander contains a collection of army lists, allowing players to fight any engagement of the Spanish Civil War or Second World War. The Spanish Civil War lists were dropped for 3rd Edition and will be placed into a separate supplement. There are no specified basing or miniature scale requirements, although 50x25mm and 50x50mm bases were recommended in 3rd Edition.

== Cold War Commander ==
Cold War Commander is an adaptation of the BlitzkriegCommander ruleset that is designed to re-create battles from the First Indo-China War right up to the present day using miniatures. It was also published by Specialist Military Publishing, before being purchased by Pendraken Miniatures in 2015.

== Future War Commander ==
Future War Commander is an adaptation of the BlitzkriegCommander ruleset that is designed to create battles from a large selection of different science fiction settings using miniatures. It was also published by Specialist Military Publishing, before being purchased by Pendraken Miniatures in 2015.
