= A Fistful of TOWs =

Series of miniatures wargame rules

Cover of 3rd edition, 2011

A Fistful of TOWs, often abbreviated FFT, is a series of modern warfare miniatures wargame rules first published in 2000. The first edition was self-published, subsequent editions were published by Fistful of Games.

== Description ==
A Fistful of TOWs – TOW stands for "tube-launched, optically tracked, wire-guided missiles" — is a set of rules designed for wargames with 6 mm miniatures at a scale of either 1" = 100 metres or 1 cm = 100 metres. The rules for modern combat have specifically been designed to provide relatively fast play.

Unlike boxed set wargames like Panzergruppe Guderian or War in Europe that include a map, counters and set of rules focussed on a particular conflict or series of conflicts, FFT is not designed for specific battles or conflicts. Instead the generic rules outline how combat and movement happen in any scenario — including airborne and amphibious assaults, airstrikes, and chemical weapons — and provide statistics on various army units, vehicles, tanks, and aircraft as well as army lists so that players can design their own scenarios for any modern conflict.

The much-expanded third edition includes 96 pages of army lists including:

- World War II lists for German, American, British, French, and Polish units.
- American army from the Korean War to present
- Russian Army from 1970 to 2015
- most NATO armies in the 1980s-1990s
- Arab-Israeli units involved in the Six-Day War and the Yom Kippur War
- Australian units 1966–2015
- North Vietnam/Vietcong during American involvement in the Vietnam War from 1964 to 1973

In addition to core and supplemental rules, the third edition also includes 128 pages of data for armaments, armored vehicles, artillery, and aircraft from the First World War to the present.

This gives players the ability to design scenarios for almost any historical global conflict of the twentieth century. These rules have become popular for designing modern conflict scenarios in time-limited settings such as wargaming conventions. FFT has also been used by Rand Corporation in developing modern wargaming concepts for the U.S. Department of Defense.

=== Gameplay ===
Each turn, which covers 5–7 minutes of game time, uses an "I Go, You Go" (IGOUGO) format where one player moves and fires, then the other player has the same opportunities.

=== Movement ===
Each unit can either move normally or strategically (double movement). A unit that moves strategically cannot participate in combat during the rest of that turn, and defensively is more vulnerable.

=== Combat ===
For ranged combat, the active player chooses a target at which to fire, and rolls a number of six-sided dice equal to the Rate of Fire of the attacking unit. The die roll required is equal to the range rating of the attacker's weapon. Depending on terrain, the target may get a saving throw to negate the attack.

During close combat, the same rules are used, but the defender fires first. If the attacker survives, the attacker returns fire. This continues until either the attacker or defender has been destroyed.

== Publication history ==
In the late 1990s, Ty Beard became frustrated with slow-moving wargames. After a particularly trying session of Combined Arms — a miniatures wargame published by Games Designers Workshop — in which only four turns were completed in 8 hours, Beard decided to design a streamlined system to produce faster-moving games. The result was a set of rules for modern combat titled A Fistful of TOWs, a coil-bound paperback self-published in 2000 written by Beard with contributions by Dave Burnett, Paul Minson, and Bob Mackenzie. In 2010, Fistful of Games released a second edition of the rules, a 204-page coil-bound softcover book written by Ty Beard that expanded the timeline of the rules back as far as 1946.

In 2011, Fistful of Games released a greatly-expanded 458-page third edition written by Ty Beard and Paul Minson that expanded the timeline back to 1915.

Future planned additions to the series are FFT:2030, covering the hypothetical wars of the mid-21st century, and Railgun: 2100, covering science fiction armored combat.

== Reception ==
Mark Severin thought that despite the length of the second edition, the rules were "easy to read and very well presented." He also liked the executive summary included with each chapter and the detailed table of contents.

In 2020, researchers at Rand Corporation looked for a commercial wargame that would serve their combat simulation research purposes and wrote that "Ground combat experts on the research team determined that FFT3 represented ground combat at the required level of granularity to allow our research team to simulate [remotely operated] and fully autonomous combat vehicles." The authors concluded that they were able to obtain the research results they needed using FFT3, saying, "Using the FFT3 commercial wargame as a basis, the researchers demonstrated how postulated [artificial intelligence and machine learning] capabilities could be incorporated into a tactical ground combat wargame."
