= List of Warhammer Fantasy novels =

After the creation of the Warhammer Fantasy universe by Games Workshop, novels were published by GW Books and Boxtree Limited, but subsequently novels have been published by the Black Library, including translations to French and German. More than 160 novels have been set in the shared universe of Warhammer Fantasy since 1989. (Note: As of July 2026, the following Warhammer Fantasy novels and anthologies are not available as e-books from Black Library (although stories from the anthologies have appeared in other compilations): A Massacre in Marienburg, A Murder in Marienburg, Day of the Daemon, Death's City, Death's Legacy, Death's Messenger, Empire in Chaos, Honour of the Grave, Hour of the Daemon, Invasion!, Keepers of the Flame, Konrad, Liar's Peak, Lords of Valour, Mark of Chaos, Mark of Damnation, Mark of Heresy, Masters of Magic, Necromancer, Night of the Daemon, Plague Daemon, Realm of Chaos, Runefang, Sacred Flesh, Shadowbreed, Star of Erengrad, Storm Warriors, Taint of Evil, Tales of the Old World, The Battle for Skull Pass, The Cold Hand of Betrayal, The Corrupted, The Enemy Within, The Island of Blood, The Laughter of Dark Gods, The Wine of Dreams, Vermintide, Warblade, Warhammer: Ignorant Armies, Warhammer: Red Thirst, Warhammer: Wolf Riders, and Zaragoz.)

According to Marc Gascoigne the idea of Chaos in Warhammer was inspired by The Eternal Champion and its sequels, written by Michael Moorcock, who made use of ideas from Three Hearts and Three Lions by Poul Anderson. The Warhammer elves were inspired by The Broken Sword by Poul Anderson as well the Middle-earth canon of J. R. R. Tolkien.

== Gotrek and Felix ==
Gotrek and Felix

=== Gotrek & Felix: The First Omnibus ===
These novels were collected in omnibus in 2003 and 2006 and with additional short stories in 2013 and 2018 (ISBN 9781784967857).

- Trollslayer by William King (1999, anthology, incorporates Geheimnisnacht originally published 1989 in Warhammer: Ignorant Armies, Wolf Riders originally published 1989 in Warhammer: Wolf Riders, The Dark Beneath the World originally published 1990 in Warhammer: Red Thirst, The Mutant Master originally published 1997 in Inferno! issue 1, and Ulric's Children originally published 1999 in Inferno! issue 11, reissue 2019, ISBN 9781781939345)
- Skavenslayer by William King (1999, incorporates Skaven's Claw originally published 1992 in White Dwarf issues 152 and 153)
- Daemonslayer by William King (1999)
- A Place of Quiet Assembly by John Brunner (short story, originally published 2010 in Hammer and Bolter issue 1)
- Blood Sport by Josh Reynolds (short story, originally published 2012 in the 15th Birthday Collection)
- Kineater by Jordan Ellinger (short story, originally published 2012 in Gotrek and Felix: The Anthology)
- Mind-Stealer by C. L. Werner (short story, originally published 2012 in Gotrek and Felix: The Anthology)
- Death and Glory! by William King (short story, originally published 1993 in Warhammer Armies: The Empire)

=== Gotrek & Felix: The Second Omnibus ===
These novels were collected in omnibus in 2004 and 2006 and with additional short stories in 2013 and 2019 (ISBN 9781784968762).

- Dragonslayer by William King (2000)
- Beastslayer by William King (2001)
- Vampireslayer by William King (2001)
- The Tilean's Talisman by David Guymer (short story, originally published 2011 in Hammer and Bolter issue 14)
- A Cask of Wynters by Josh Reynolds (short story, originally published 2012 in Gotrek and Felix: The Anthology)
- Prophecy by Ben McCallum (short story, originally published 2012 in Gotrek and Felix: The Anthology)
- Lord of Undeath by William King (short story, originally published 1994 in Warhammer Armies: Undead)
- The Two Crowns of Ras Karim by Nathan Long (short story, 2006)

=== Gotrek & Felix: The Third Omnibus ===
These novels and short story were collected in omnibus in 2009 and with additional short stories in 2013 and 2019 (ISBN 9781784969875).

- Giantslayer by William King (2003)
- Redhand's Daughter by William King (short story, originally published 2003 in Inferno! issue 36)
- Orcslayer by Nathan Long (2006)
- Manslayer by Nathan Long (2007)
- The Oberwald Ripper by L. J. Goulding (short story, originally published 2012 in Hammer and Bolter issue 18)
- Red Snow by Nathan Long (short story, originally published 2010 in Death & Dishonour)
- Last Orders by Andy Smillie (short story, originally published 2012 in Gotrek and Felix: The Anthology)

=== Gotrek & Felix: The Fourth Omnibus ===
These novels, novella and short stories were collected in omnibus in 2013 and 2019 (ISBN 9781781939598).

- Elfslayer by Nathan Long (2008)
- Slayer of the Storm God by Nathan Long (novella, originally published 2009 as an audio drama)
- Shamanslayer by Nathan Long (2009)
- Zombieslayer by Nathan Long (2010)
- The Funeral of Gotrek Gurnisson by Richard Salter (short story, originally published 2012 in Gotrek and Felix: The Anthology)
- Slayer's Honour by Nathan Long (short story, originally published 2012 in Gotrek and Felix: The Anthology)

=== Gotrek & Felix: The Fifth Omnibus ===
These novels and short stories were collected in omnibus in 2020 (ISBN 9781789992922).

- Road of Skulls by Josh Reynolds (2013)
- The Serpent Queen by Josh Reynolds (2014)
- Lost Tales (2013, ISBN 9781849704106)
  - Charnel Congress by Josh Reynolds
  - The Reckoning by Jordan Ellinger
  - Into the Valley of Death by Frank Cavallo
  - Curse of the Everliving by David Guymer
- Marriage of Moment by Josh Reynolds (short story, 2014)
- Berthold's Beard by Josh Reynolds (short story, originally published 2012 in Black Library Weekender: Volume One)
- The Contest by Jordan Ellinger (short story, previously part of the Advent Calendar 2012 eBundle)

=== Gotrek & Felix: The Sixth Omnibus ===
These novels and short story were collected in omnibus in 2021 (ISBN 9781800260047).

- City of the Damned by David Guymer (2013, ISBN 9781849705288)
- Kinslayer by David Guymer (2014, ISBN 9781849707299, paperback 2016, ISBN 9781784963798)
- Rememberers by David Guymer (short story, 2015)
- Slayer by David Guymer (2015, ISBN 9781849708401, paperback 2016, ISBN 9781784964368)

=== Other stories ===
- The Lost Kinsmen by William King (short story, originally published 1990 in Realm of Chaos: The Lost and the Damned, ISBN 1869893522, republished 2013 in Gotrek and Felix: Myths and Legends, ISBN 9781782511328)

== Warhammer Chronicles ==
=== The Legend of Sigmar ===
These novels and short stories were authored by Graham McNeill and collected in omnibus in 2012 and with an additional short story in 2017 (ISBN 9781784965730) and 2025. Heldenhammer won the David Gemmell Legend Award in 2010.

- Heldenhammer (2008)
- Empire (2009)
- God King (2010)
- Let The Great Axe Fall (short story, 2012)
- Gods of Flesh and Blood (short story, originally published 2012 in Black Library Weekender: Volume One)
- Sword Guardian (short story, originally published 2012 in the 15th Birthday Collection)

=== The Rise of Nagash ===
These novels were authored by Mike Lee and collected in omnibus in 2012 and with an additional short story in 2017 (ISBN 9781784966188) and 2025.

- Nagash the Sorcerer (2008)
- Nagash the Unbroken (2010)
- Nagash Immortal (2011)
- Picking the Bones (short story, 2012)

=== Vampire Wars: The von Carstein Trilogy ===
These novels and short stories were authored by Steven Savile and collected in omnibus in 2008 and 2018 (ISBN 9781784966287).

- Inheritance (2006)
- Dominion (2006)
- Retribution (2007)
- Death's Cold Kiss (short story, originally published 2006 in The Cold Hand of Betrayal)
- The Court of the Crimson Queen (short story, 2008)

=== The Sundering ===
These novels and stories were authored by Gav Thorpe and collected in omnibus in 2012 and 2018 (ISBN 9781784966447).

- Malekith (2009)
- The Bloody-Handed (novella, 2010)
- Shadow King (2009)
- Caledor (2011)
- The Dark Path (short story, originally published in the Black Library Live! 2009 Chapbook)

=== Champions of Chaos ===
These novels and short stories were collected in omnibus in 2018 (ISBN 9781784966775).

- Sigvald by Darius Hinks (2011)
- Valkia the Bloody by S. P. Cawkwell (2009)
- Bloodraven by S. P. Cawkwell (short story, originally published 2012 in Age of Legend)
- Blood Blessing by S. P. Cawkwell (short story, originally published 2012 in the 15th Birthday Collection)
- Reaper by S. P. Cawkwell (short story, originally published in the Black Library Live! 2012 Chapbook)
- Harbinger by S. P. Cawkwell (short story, 2014)
- Van Horstmann by Ben Counter (2013)

=== The War of Vengeance ===
These novels were collected in omnibus in 2015 and 2018 (ISBN 9781784966935).

- The Great Betrayal by Nick Kyme (2012)
- Master of Dragons by Chris Wraight (2013)
- The Curse of the Phoenix Crown by C. L. Werner (2015)

=== Mathias Thulmann: Witch Hunter ===
These novels and short stories were authored by C. L. Werner and collected in omnibus in 2008 and 2018 (ISBN 9781784967086).

- A Choice of Hatreds (short story, originally published 2001 in Inferno! issue 22)
- Meat Wagon (short story, originally published 2003 in Inferno! issue 35)
- Witch Work (short story, 2008)
- Witch Hunter (2004, reissue 2022, ISBN 9781844160716)
- Witch Finder (2005)
- Witch Killer (2006)

=== Ulrika the Vampire ===
These novels were authored by Nathan Long and collected in omnibus in 2018 (ISBN 9781784967291).

- Bloodborn (2010)
- Bloodforged (2011)
- Bloodsworn (2012)

=== Masters of Stone and Steel ===
These novels and short story were collected in omnibus in 2011 under the name Dwarfs and with an additional novel and short story in 2018 (ISBN 9781784967703).

- The Doom of Dragonback by Gav Thorpe (2014)
- Ancestral Honour by Gav Thorpe (short story, originally published 2001 in Inferno! issue 23)
- Grudge Bearer by Gav Thorpe (2005)
- Oathbreaker by Nick Kyme (2008)
- Honourkeeper by Nick Kyme (2009)
- City of Dead Jewels by Nick Kyme (short story, originally published 2012 in Age of Legend)

=== The Tyrion & Teclis Omnibus ===
These novels were authored by William King and collected in omnibus in 2018 (ISBN 9781784968359).

- Blood of Aenarion (2011)
- Sword of Caledor (2012)
- Bane of Malekith (2013)

=== Warriors of the Chaos Wastes ===
These novels were authored by C. L. Werner and collected in omnibus in 2019 (ISBN 9781784968571).

- Palace of the Plague Lord (2007)
- Blood for the Blood God (2008)
- Wulfrik (2010)

=== Knights of the Empire ===
These novels and short stories were collected in omnibus in 2019 (ISBN 9781784968939).

- Hammers of Ulric by Dan Abnett, Nik Vincent, and James Wallis (2000, incorporates The Dead Among Us originally published 1998 in Inferno! issue 5, A Company of Wolves originally published 1998 in Inferno! issue 7, Wolf in Sheep's Clothing originally published 1998 in Inferno! issue 9, and The Bretonnian Connection originally published 1999 in Inferno! issue 13, reissue 2020, ISBN 9781789992212)
- Reiksguard by Richard Williams (2009)
- Knight of the Blazing Sun by Josh Reynolds (2012)
- Dead Calm by Josh Reynolds (short story, originally published 2011 in Hammer and Bolter issue 13)
- Stromfel's Teeth by Josh Reynolds (short story, originally published 2012 in Hammer and Bolter issue 17)
- Lords of the Marsh by Josh Reynolds (short story, originally published 2012 in Hammer and Bolter issue 20)
- Dead Man's Party by Josh Reynolds (short story, originally published 2012 in Hammer and Bolter issue 21)
- Bernheimer's Gun by Josh Reynolds (short story, 2014)

=== Warlords of Karak Eight Peaks ===
These novels and stories were collected in omnibus in 2019 (ISBN 9781784969080).

- Skarsnik by Guy Haley (2013, reissue 2023, ISBN 9781849703512)
- Headtaker by David Guymer (2013)
- Thorgrim by David Guymer (novella, 2014)
- The Karag Durak Grudge by David Guymer (short story, 2013)
- The King of Black Crag by Guy Haley (short story, 2013)

=== Skaven Wars: The Black Plague Trilogy ===
These novels were authored by C. L. Werner and collected in omnibus in 2015 and with additional short stories in 2019 (ISBN 9781784969349).

- Dead Winter (2012)
- Blighted Empire (2013)
- Wolf of Sigmar (2014)
- Plague Priest (short story, originally published 2012 in the Black Library Games Day Anthology 2011/12)
- Plague Doktor (short story, originally published 2012 in Age of Legend)
- A Question of Faith (short story, 2014)
- The Last Man (short story, originally published 2013 in The Black Library Anthology 2013/14)

=== The Orion Trilogy ===
These novels were authored by Darius Hinks and collected in omnibus in 2019 (ISBN 9781784969967).

- The Vaults of Winter (2012)
- Tears of Isha (2013)
- The Council of Beasts (2014)

=== Brunner the Bounty Hunter ===
These novels and short story were authored by C. L. Werner and collected in omnibus in 2010 (ISBN 9781844168668) and 2019 (ISBN 9781781939420).

- What Price Vengeance? (short story, rewritten version, originally published 2002 in Inferno! issue 33)
- Blood Money (2002, omnibus incorporates a rewritten version of Wolfshead originally published 2010 in Death & Dishonour)
- Blood and Steel (2003, omnibus incorporates Sickhouse originally published 2005 in Inferno! issue 46)
- Blood of the Dragon (2004)

=== Thanquol and Boneripper ===
These novels and short stories were authored by C. L. Werner and collected in omnibus in 2019 (ISBN 9781781939888).

- Grey Seer (2009, reissue 2025, ISBN 9781844167388)
- Temple of the Serpent (2010)
- Thanquol's Doom (2011)
- Mind-Stealer (short story, originally published 2012 in Gotrek and Felix: The Anthology)
- Thanquol Triumphant (short story, previously part of the Advent Calendar 2012 eBundle)

=== Heroes of the Empire ===
These novels and short stories were authored by Chris Wraight and collected in omnibus in 2012 under the name Swords of the Emperor, in 2016 under the name Total War: The Emperor's Armies, and with an additional novel and short story in 2020 (ISBN 9781789990416).

- Sword of Justice (2010)
- Feast of Horrors (short story, originally published in the Black Library Live! 2010 Chapbook)
- Sword of Vengeance (2011)
- Duty and Honour (short story, 2012)
- Luthor Huss (2012)
- The March of Doom by Chris Wraight (short story, originally published 2012 in the Black Library Games Day Anthology 2011/12)

=== Elves: The Omnibus ===
These novels and short stories were authored by Graham McNeill and collected in omnibus in 2012 and 2020 (ISBN 9781789991390).

- Kinstrife (short story, originally published 2006 in The Cold Hand of Betrayal)
- Defenders of Ulthuan (2007)
- Sons of Ellyrion (2011)
- Deathmasque (short story, originally published in the Black Library Live! 2011 Chapbook)
- Guardians of the Forest (2005)
- Freedom's Home or Glory's Grave (short story, originally published 2007 in Tales of the Old World)

=== Undeath Ascendant: A Vampire Counts Omnibus ===
These novels and short stories were collected in omnibus in 2011 under the name Vampires (ISBN 9781849701655) and with an additional novel in 2021 (ISBN 9781789998306).

- The Red Duke by C. L. Werner (2011, ISBN 9781849700733)
- Ancient Blood by Robert Earl (2008, ISBN 9781844165377)
- Curse of the Necrarch by Steven Savile (2008, ISBN 9781844166565)
- Portrait of My Undying Lady by Gordon Rennie (short story, originally published 2000 in Inferno! issue 21)
- The Vampire Hunters by Robert Earl (short story, originally published 2004 in Inferno! issue 41)
- Three Knights by Graham McNeill (short story, originally published 2002 in Inferno! issue 29)

=== The Chronicles of Malus Darkblade: Volume One ===
These novels and short story were authored by Dan Abnett and Mike Lee and collected in omnibus in 2008 (ISBN 9781844166589) and 2021 (ISBN 9781789990782).

- The Blood Price (short story, 2008)
- The Daemon's Curse (2005, reissue 2021, ISBN 9781784968212)
- Bloodstorm (2005)
- Reaper of Souls (2006)

=== Knights of Bretonnia ===
These novels, novellas and short story were authored by Anthony Reynolds and collected in omnibus in 2011 (ISBN 9781849700306) and 2021 (ISBN 9781800260061).

- Knight Errant (2008, ISBN 9781844165513)
- Knight of the Realm (2009, ISBN 9781844166947)
- Rest Eternal (short story, originally published 2010 in Death & Dishonour)
- Questing Knight (novella, originally published 2010 in Hammer and Bolter issue 1)
- Grail Knight (novella, originally published 2011 in Hammer and Bolter issue 6)

=== The Chronicles of Malus Darkblade: Volume Two ===
These novels and short story were collected in omnibus in 2009 (ISBN 9781844167821) and 2022 (ISBN 9781800261396).

- Warpsword by Dan Abnett and Mike Lee (2007)
- Lord of Ruin by Dan Abnett and Mike Lee (2007)
- Deathblade by C. L. Werner (2015)
- Bloodwalker by C. L. Werner (short story, originally published 2012 in Black Library Weekender: Volume Two)

=== Empire at War ===
These novels and short stories were collected in omnibus in 2014 under the name The Empire (ISBN 9781849705868) and, using a different selection, in 2022 (ISBN 9781789990485). Warrior Priest won the David Gemmell Morningstar Award in 2011.

- Riders of the Dead by Dan Abnett (2003, ISBN 184416019X, reissue 2024, ISBN 9781844160198)
- Grimblades by Nick Kyme (2010)
- Warrior Priest by Darius Hinks (2010)
- Swords of the Empire edited by Marc Gascoigne and Christian Dunn (2004, ISBN 1844160882)
  - The Vampire Hunters by Robert Earl (originally published 2004 in Inferno! issue 41)
  - Meat Wagon by C. L. Werner (originally published 2003 in Inferno! issue 35)
  - The Case of the Scarlet Cell by Gordon Rennie
  - Rest for the Wicked by James Wallis (originally published 2002 in Inferno! issue 32)
  - The Nagenhof Bell by Jonathan Green (originally published 2001 in Inferno! issue 27)
  - Swords of the Empire by Dan Abnett
- Shyi-Zar by Dan Abnett (short story, originally published 2004 in the Chaos Rising booklet, ISBN 1844161374)
- As Dead As Flesh by Nick Kyme (short story, originally published 2004 in Inferno! issue 45)
- Dead Man's Hand by Nick Kyme (short story, originally published 2007 in Tales of the Old World)
- Sanctity by Nick Kyme (short story, originally published 2007 in Invasion!)
- The Miracle at Berlau by Darius Hinks (short story, originally published 2010 in Death & Dishonour)

=== Blackhearts ===
These novels and short stories were authored by Nathan Long and collected in omnibus in 2007 (ISBN 9781844165100) and 2023 (ISBN 9781789996722).

- Hetzau's Follies (short story, originally published 2005 in Inferno! issue 46)
- Valnir's Bane (2004)
- Rotten Fruit (short story, originally published 2007 in Tales of the Old World)
- The Broken Lance (2005)
- Tainted Blood (2006)

=== The End Times: Fall of Empires ===
These novels and short stories were collected in omnibus in 2016 under the name Lords of the Dead (ISBN 9781784961510) and with an additional novella in 2024 (ISBN 9781804075388).

- Sigmar's Blood by Phil Kelly (novella, 2013, ISBN 9781849705707)
- The Return of Nagash by Josh Reynolds (2014)
- The Fall of Altdorf by Chris Wraight (2014)
- The Bone Cage by Phil Kelly (short story, 2014)
- With Ice and Sword by Graham McNeill (short story, 2015)
- Marienburg's Stand by David Guymer (short story, 2015)

=== The End Times: Doom of the Old World ===
These novels and short stories were collected in omnibus in 2016 under the names The End Times: Doom of the Elves (ISBN 9781784961626) and The End Times: Death of the Old World (ISBN 9781784961756) and in 2024 (ISBN 9781804075418).

- The Curse of Khaine by Gav Thorpe (2014)
- The Rise of the Horned Rat by Guy Haley (2015, ISBN 9781849708821, paperback 2015, ISBN 9781849709460)
- The Lord of the End Times by Josh Reynolds (2015, ISBN 9781849708968)
- The Siege of Naggarond by S. P. Cawkwell (short story, 2015)
- Bride of Khaine by Graeme Lyon (short story, 2015)

== Warhammer Fantasy ==
=== The Adventures of Florin & Lorenzo ===
These novels and short story were authored by Robert Earl and collected in omnibus in 2009 (ISBN 9781844166817).

- The Burning Shore (2004)
- Haute Cuisine (short story, originally published 2007 in Tales of the Old World)
- Wild Kingdoms (2004)
- Savage City (2005)

=== The Ambassador Chronicles ===
These novels were authored by Graham McNeill and collected in omnibus in 2005 (ISBN 9781844161997).

- The Ambassador (2003, incorporates The Ambassador originally published 2001 in Inferno! issue 25)
- Ursun's Teeth (2004)

=== Angelika Fleischer ===
These novels and short stories were authored by Robin D. Laws and collected in omnibus in 2010 under the name The Fleischer Omnibus (ISBN 9781844169139).

- Meat & Bone (short story, originally published 2002 in Inferno! issue 28)
- Honour of the Grave (2003, ISBN 1844160041)
- Sacred Flesh (2004, ISBN 1844160912)
- Liar's Peak (2005, ISBN 9781844162338)
- Head Hunting (short story, originally published 2002 in Inferno! issue 31)

=== Archaon ===
These novels and short story were authored by Rob Sanders and collected in omnibus in 2016 under the name Total War: Lord of Chaos (ISBN 9781784964047). They serve as a prequel to The End Times.

- Archaon: Everchosen (2014, ISBN 9781849708326)
- Archaon: Lord of Chaos (2015)
- Archaon: The Fall and the Rise (short story, 2014)

=== Blood of Nagash ===
These novels were authored by Josh Reynolds.

- Neferata (2012, ISBN 9781849705363)
- Master of Death (2013, ISBN 9781849705264)

=== Blood on the Reik ===
These novels were authored by Alex Stewart under the pen name Sandy Mitchell.

- Death's Messenger (2005, ISBN 9781844160938)
- Death's City (2005, ISBN 9781844162406)
- Death's Legacy (2006, ISBN 9781844163922)

=== Daemon Gates ===
These novels were authored by Aaron Rosenberg.

- Day of the Daemon (2006, ISBN 9781844163663)
- Night of the Daemon (2007, ISBN 9781844163670)
- Hour of the Daemon (2007, ISBN 9781844163687)

=== Gilead ===
These novels and short story were authored by Dan Abnett and Nik Vincent.

- Gilead's Blood (2001, incorporates Gilead's Wake originally published 1997 in Inferno! issue 3, Gilead's Fate originally published 1998 in Inferno! issue 8, and Gilead's Test originally published 1999 in Inferno! issue 13, reissue 2013, ISBN 9781849703802)
- Gilead's Curse (2013, ISBN 9781849703567, originally serialized 2011 and 2012 in Hammer and Bolter issues 13 to 26)

=== The Konrad Saga ===
These novels were authored by David S. Garnett under the pen name David Ferring and collected in omnibus in 2005 (ISBN 9781841542768).

- Konrad (1989, reissue 2001, ISBN 1841541567)
- Shadowbreed (1990, reissue 2002, ISBN 1841542083)
- Warblade (1993, reissue 2002, ISBN 1841542334)

=== Marienburg ===
These novels were authored by David Bishop.

- A Murder in Marienburg (2007, ISBN 9781844164745)
- A Massacre in Marienburg (2008, ISBN 9781844166701)

=== Marks of Chaos ===
These novels were authored by James Wallis and collected in omnibus in 2010 (ISBN 9781844169054).

- Mark of Damnation (2003, ISBN 1841542792)
- Mark of Heresy (2003, ISBN 1844160491)
- No Rest for the Wicked (short story, originally published 2002 in Inferno! issue 32)
- A Night Too Long (short story, originally published 2003 in Inferno! issue 37)

=== Slaves to Darkness ===
These novels were authored by Gav Thorpe and collected in omnibus in 2012 (ISBN 9781849702669).

- The Claws of Chaos (2002, ISBN 1841542571)
- The Blades of Chaos (2003, ISBN 1844160181)
- The Heart of Chaos (2004, ISBN 1844161145)

=== Stefan Kumansky ===
These novels were authored by Neil McIntosh.

- Star of Erengrad (2002, ISBN 1841542652)
- Taint of Evil (2003, ISBN 1844160459, rewritten version of The Gifts of Tal Dur originally published 2000 in Inferno! issue 20)
- Keepers of the Flame (2005, ISBN 1844161862, rewritten version of Debt of Blood originally published 2001 in Inferno! issue 23)

=== Storm of Magic ===
- Razumov's Tomb by Darius Hinks (2011, ISBN 9781849701150)
- Dragonmage by Chris Wraight (2011, ISBN 9781849701174)
- The Hour of Shadows by C. L. Werner (2011, ISBN 9781849701198)

=== Tales of Orfeo ===
These novels were authored by Brian Stableford under the pen name Brian Craig.

- Zaragoz (1989, reissue 2002, ISBN 1841542318)
- Plague Daemon (1990, reissue 2002, ISBN 1841542539)
- Storm Warriors (1991, reissue 2002, ISBN 1841542598)

=== The Vampire Genevieve ===
These novels were authored by Kim Newman under the pen name Jack Yeovil and collected in omnibus in 2005 (ISBN 9781844162444) and 2021 (ISBN 9781800260733).

- Drachenfels (1989, reissue 2019, ISBN 9781784968823)
- Genevieve Undead (1993, reissue 2019, ISBN 9781784969820)
- Beasts in Velvet (1993, reissue 2019, ISBN 9781784968946)
- Silver Nails (2002, reissue 2019, ISBN 9781784969097)
  - Red Thirst (originally published 1990 in Warhammer: Red Thirst)
  - No Gold in the Grey Mountains (originally published 1989 in Warhammer: Wolf Riders)
  - The Ignorant Armies (originally published 1989 in Warhammer: Ignorant Armies)
  - The Warhawk
  - The Ibby the Fish Factor

=== Warhammer Online: Age of Reckoning ===
- Empire in Chaos by Anthony Reynolds (2008, ISBN 9781844165278)
- Dark Storm Gathering by Chris Wraight (2009, ISBN 9781844166787)
- Forged by Chaos by C. L. Werner (2009, ISBN 9781844167814)

=== Zavant Konniger ===
This novel and short story were authored by Gordon Rennie and collected in omnibus in 2011 (ISBN 9781844168378).

- Zavant (2002, ISBN 1841542032, incorporates The Affair of the Araby Exhibit originally published 1999 in Inferno! issue 10 and Red Moon Over Altdorf originally published 1999 in Inferno! issue 14)
- The Case of the Scarlet Cell (short story, originally published 2004 in Swords of the Empire)

=== Stand-alone novels ===
- The Wine of Dreams by Brian Stableford under the pen name Brian Craig (2000, ISBN 1841541230)
- The Dead and the Damned by Jonathan Green (2002, ISBN 1841542660, incorporates The Hounds of Winter originally published 1997 in White Dwarf issue 210, Dark Heart originally published 1998 in Inferno! issue 5, and The Plague Pit originally published 2000 in Inferno! issue 20)
- Magestorm by Jonathan Green (2004, ISBN 1844160742)
- Forged in Battle by Justin Hunter (2005, ISBN 1844161536)
- Necromancer by Jonathan Green (2005, ISBN 1844161587)
- Vermintide by Bruno Lee (2006, ISBN 9781844162864)
- Fell Cargo by Dan Abnett (2006, ISBN 9781844163014, originally serialized 2003 in Inferno! issues 35 and 37 to 39, reissue 2010, ISBN 9781844169092)
- The Corrupted by Robert Earl (2006, ISBN 9781844163977)
- Mark of Chaos by Anthony Reynolds (2006, ISBN 9781844163960)
- The Enemy Within by Richard L. Byers (2007, ISBN 9781844164448)
- Masters of Magic by Chris Wraight (2008, ISBN 9781844165339)
- Runefang by C. L. Werner (2008, ISBN 9781844165483)
- The Battle for Skull Pass by Nathan Long (2009, ISBN 9781844167685)
- Iron Company by Chris Wraight (2009, reissue 2020, ISBN 9781789993479)
- Call to Arms by Mitchel Scanlon (2010, ISBN 9781844168125)
- The Island of Blood by Darius Hinks (2010, ISBN 9781844168521)
- Broken Honour by Robert Earl (2011, ISBN 9781849700269)
- Dreadfleet by Phil Kelly (2011, ISBN 9781849701235)
- Lords of the Lance by Graham McNeill (2024, ISBN 9781804072080)
- Blood of the Bastion by Evan Dicken (2026)

=== Anthologies ===
- Warhammer: Ignorant Armies edited by David Pringle (1989, reissue 1993, ISBN 1852833734)
  - Geheimnisnacht by William King
  - The Reavers and the Dead by Charles Stross under the pen name Charles Davidson
  - The Other by Nicola Griffith
  - Apprentice Luck by Paul McAuley under the pen name Sean Flynn
  - A Gardener in Parravon by Brian Stableford under the pen name Brian Craig
  - The Star Boat by Steve Baxter
  - The Ignorant Armies by Kim Newman under the pen name Jack Yeovil
  - The Laughter of Dark Gods by William King
- Warhammer: Wolf Riders edited by David Pringle (1989, ISBN 1855150042, reissue 1995, ISBN 0752208691)
  - Wolf Riders by William King
  - The Tilean Rat by Alex Stewart under the pen name Sandy Mitchell
  - The Phantom of Yremy by Brian Stableford under the pen name Brian Craig
  - Cry of the Beast by Ralph T. Castle
  - No Gold in the Grey Mountains by Kim Newman under the pen name Jack Yeovil
  - The Hammer of the Stars by Pete Garratt
  - Pulg's Grand Carnival by Simon Ounsley
  - The Way of the Witchfinder by Brian Stableford under the pen name Brian Craig
- Warhammer: Red Thirst edited by David Pringle (1990, ISBN 1872372074, reissue 1995, ISBN 0752209752)
  - Red Thirst by Kim Newman under the pen name Jack Yeovil
  - The Dark Beneath the World by William King
  - The Spells Below by Neil Jones
  - The Light of Transfiguration by Brian Stableford under the pen name Brian Craig
  - The Song by Steve Baxter
  - The Voyage South by Nicola Griffith
- Realm of Chaos edited by Marc Gascoigne and Andy Jones (2000, ISBN 1841541079)
  - Birth of a Legend by Gav Thorpe (originally published 1997 in Inferno! issue 2)
  - The Hounds of Winter by Jonathan Green (originally published 1997 in White Dwarf issue 210)
  - Hatred by Ben Chessel (originally published 1997 in Inferno! issue 2)
  - Grunsonn's Marauders by Andy Jones (originally published 1997 in Inferno! issue 1)
  - The Doorway Between by Rjurik Davidson (originally published 1999 in Inferno! issue 12)
  - Mormacar's Lament by Chris Pramas (originally published 1998 in Inferno! issue 6)
  - The Blessed Ones by Rani Kellock (originally published 1999 in Inferno! issue 11)
  - Dark Heart by Jonathan Green (originally published 1998 in Inferno! issue 5)
  - The Chaos Beneath by Mark Brendan (originally published 1998 in Inferno! issue 7)
  - Paradise Lost by Andy Jones (originally published 1998 in Inferno! issue 4)
  - Wolf in the Fold by Ben Chessel (originally published 1998 in Inferno! issue 9)
  - The Faithful Servant by Gav Thorpe (originally published 1997 in Inferno! issue 3)
- Lords of Valour edited by Marc Gascoigne and Christian Dunn (2001, ISBN 1841541508)
  - Faith by Robert Earl (originally published 2000 in Inferno! issue 17)
  - A Choice of Hatreds by C. L. Werner (originally published 2001 in Inferno! issue 22)
  - Tybalt's Quest by Gav Thorpe (originally published 2000 in Inferno! issue 18)
  - Who Mourns a Necromancer? by Brian Stableford under the pen name Brian Craig (originally published 2000 in Inferno! issue 17)
  - Son and Heir by Ian Winterton (originally published 2000 in Inferno! issue 21)
  - The Judas Goat by Robert Earl (originally published 1999 in Inferno! issue 15)
  - The Sound Which Wakes You by Ben Chessel (originally published 2000 in Inferno! issue 21)
  - Portrait of My Undying Lady by Gordon Rennie (originally published 2000 in Inferno! issue 21)
  - The Plague Pit by Jonathan Green (originally published 2000 in Inferno! issue 20)
  - Ancestral Honour by Gav Thorpe (originally published 2001 in Inferno! issue 23)
  - A Gentleman's War by Neil Rutledge (originally published 1999 in Inferno! issue 15)
  - The Ultimate Ritual by Neil Jones and William King (originally published 1999 in Inferno! issue 16)
- The Laughter of Dark Gods edited by David Pringle (2002, ISBN 1841542431)
  - The Laughter of Dark Gods by William King (originally published 1989 in Warhammer: Ignorant Armies)
  - The Reavers and the Dead by Charles Stross under the pen name Charles Davidson (originally published 1989 in Warhammer: Ignorant Armies)
  - The Phantom of Yremy by Brian Stableford under the pen name Brian Craig (originally published 1989 in Warhammer: Wolf Riders)
  - The Other by Nicola Griffith (originally published 1989 in Warhammer: Ignorant Armies)
  - The Song by Steve Baxter (originally published 1990 in Warhammer: Red Thirst)
  - Apprentice Luck by Paul McAuley under the pen name Sean Flynn (originally published 1989 in Warhammer: Ignorant Armies)
  - The Light of Transfiguration by Brian Stableford under the pen name Brian Craig (originally published 1990 in Warhammer: Red Thirst)
  - The Spells Below by Neil Jones (originally published 1990 in Warhammer: Red Thirst)
  - Cry of the Beast by Ralph T. Castle (originally published 1989 in Warhammer: Wolf Riders)
  - A Gardener in Parravon by Brian Stableford under the pen name Brian Craig (originally published 1989 in Warhammer: Ignorant Armies)
  - The Tilean Rat by Alex Stewart under the pen name Sandy Mitchell (originally published 1989 in Warhammer: Wolf Riders)
- Way of the Dead edited by Marc Gascoigne and Christian Dunn (2003, ISBN 1844160130)
  - Glow by Simon Spurrier (originally published 2003 in Inferno! issue 34)
  - Head Hunting by Robin D. Laws (originally published 2002 in Inferno! issue 31)
  - The Small Ones by C. L. Werner (originally published 2001 in Inferno! issue 26)
  - Three Knights by Graham McNeill (originally published 2002 in Inferno! issue 29)
  - The Road to Damnation by Brian Stableford under the pen name Brian Craig
  - Mark of the Beast by Jonathan Green (originally published 2003 in Inferno! issue 34)
  - Jahama's Lesson by Matthew Farrer (originally published 2002 in Inferno! issue 24)
  - A Good Thief by Simon Jowett (originally published 2002 in Inferno! issue 32)
  - What Price Vengeance? by C. L. Werner (originally published 2002 in Inferno! issue 33)
- The Cold Hand of Betrayal edited by Marc Gascoigne and Christian Dunn (2006, ISBN 9781844162888)
  - Kinstrife by Graham McNeill
  - Small Mercy by Richard Ford
  - Perfect Assassin by Nick Kyme (originally published 2004 in Inferno! issue 40)
  - Sickhouse by C. L. Werner (originally published 2005 in Inferno! issue 46)
  - In the Service of Sigmar by Adam Troke
  - Blood and Sand by Matt Ralphs
  - Son of the Empire by Robert Allan
  - The Daemon's Gift by Robert Baumgartner
  - Death's Cold Kiss by Steven Savile
- Tales of the Old World edited by Marc Gascoigne and Christian Dunn (2007, ISBN 9781844164523)
  - Freedom's Home or Glory's Grave by Graham McNeill
  - Ancestral Honour by Gav Thorpe (originally published 2001 in Inferno! issue 23)
  - A Gentleman's War by Neil Rutledge (originally published 1999 in Inferno! issue 15)
  - The Doorway Between by Rjurik Davidson (originally published 1999 in Inferno! issue 12)
  - Birth of a Legend by Gav Thorpe (originally published 1997 in Inferno! issue 2)
  - Haute Cuisine by Robert Earl
  - Paradise Lost by Andy Jones (originally published 1998 in Inferno! issue 4)
  - Night Too Long by James Wallis (originally published 2003 in Inferno! issue 37)
  - Grunsonn's Marauders by Andy Jones (originally published 1997 in Inferno! issue 1)
  - The Man Who Stabbed Luther van Groot by Alex Stewart under the pen name Sandy Mitchell
  - The Faithful Servant by Gav Thorpe (originally published 1997 in Inferno! issue 3)
  - The Sound Which Wakes You by Ben Chessel (originally published 2000 in Inferno! issue 21)
  - The Sleep of the Dead by Darius Hinks (originally published 2003 in Inferno! issue 38)
  - The Path of Warriors by Neil McIntosh (originally published 2002 in Inferno! issue 33)
  - Rat Trap by Robert Earl
  - Rotten Fruit by Nathan Long
  - Faith by Robert Earl (originally published 2000 in Inferno! issue 17)
  - Portrait of My Undying Lady by Gordon Rennie (originally published 2000 in Inferno! issue 21)
  - The Seventh Boon by Mitchel Scanlon (originally published 2004 in Inferno! issue 43)
  - Rattenkrieg by Robert Earl (originally published 2004 in Inferno! issue 45)
  - Mormacar's Lament by Chris Pramas (originally published 1998 in Inferno! issue 6)
  - The Chaos Beneath by Mark Brendan (originally published 1998 in Inferno! issue 7)
  - Wolf in the Fold by Ben Chessel (originally published 1998 in Inferno! issue 9)
  - The Blessed Ones by Rani Kellock (originally published 1999 in Inferno! issue 11)
  - Dead Man's Hand by Nick Kyme
  - Shyi-Zar by Dan Abnett (originally published 2004 in the Chaos Rising booklet, ISBN 1844161374)
  - Tybalt's Quest by Gav Thorpe (originally published 2000 in Inferno! issue 18)
  - A Choice of Hatreds by C. L. Werner (originally published 2001 in Inferno! issue 22)
  - Who Mourns a Necromancer? by Brian Stableford under the pen name Brian Craig (originally published 2000 in Inferno! issue 17)
  - The Hanging Tree by Jonathan Green (originally published 2004 in Inferno! issue 42)
  - The Doom that Came to Wulfhafen by C. L. Werner (originally published 2002 in Inferno! issue 29)
  - Hatred by Ben Chessell (originally published 1997 in Inferno! issue 2)
  - Son and Heir by Ian Winterton (originally published 2000 in Inferno! issue 21)
  - Ill Met in Mordheim by Robert Waters
  - Totentanz by Brian Stableford under the pen name Brian Craig (originally published 2001 in Inferno! issue 27)
  - The Ultimate Ritual by Neil Jones and William King (originally published 1999 in Inferno! issue 16)
- Invasion! edited by Marc Gascoigne and Christian Dunn (2007, ISBN 9781844164806)
  - None So Blind by Nathan Long
  - Premonition by Chris Wraight
  - Purification by Robert E. Vardeman
  - Sanctity by Nick Kyme
  - Spoils of War by Rick Wolf
  - The Gift by Jesse Cavazos V
  - River of Blood by Steven Eden
  - Lies of the Flesh by Steven Savile
  - Perilous Visions by Mike Lee
- Death & Dishonour edited by Alex Davis, Nick Kyme and Lindsey Priestley (2010, ISBN 9781844168064)
  - Red Snow by Nathan Long
  - The Assassin's Dilemma by David Earle
  - Rest Eternal by Anthony Reynolds
  - The Miracle at Berlau by Darius Hinks
  - Noblesse Oblige by Robert Earl
  - The Last Ride of Heiner Rothstein by Ross O'Brien
  - Broken Blood by Paul Kearney
  - The Judgement of Crows by Chris Wraight
  - Wolfshead by C. L. Werner
- War Unending edited by Christian Dunn (2010, ISBN 9781844169108)
  - Swords of the Empire by Dan Abnett (originally published 2004 in Swords of the Empire)
  - The Small Ones by C. L. Werner (originally published 2001 in Inferno! issue 26)
  - Rattenkrieg by Robert Earl (originally published 2004 in Inferno! issue 45)
  - Redhand's Daughter by William King (originally published 2003 in Inferno! issue 36)
  - Portrait of My Undying Lady by Gordon Rennie (originally published 2000 in Inferno! issue 21)
  - Virtue's Reward by Darius Hinks
  - The Blood Price by Dan Abnett and Mike Lee (originally published 2008 in The Chronicles of Malus Darkblade: Volume One)
  - Glow by Simon Spurrier (originally published 2003 in Inferno! issue 34)
  - Three Knights by Graham McNeill (originally published 2002 in Inferno! issue 29)
  - The Seventh Boon by Mitchel Scanlon (originally published 2004 in Inferno! issue 43)
  - Broken Blood by Paul Kearney (originally published 2010 in Death & Dishonour)
- Age of Legend edited by Christian Dunn (2012, ISBN 9781849701006)
  - A Small Victory by Paul S. Kemp
  - Bloodraven by S. P. Cawkwell
  - City of Dead Jewels by Nick Kyme
  - The Last Charge by Andy Hoare (originally published 2011 in Hammer and Bolter issue 10)
  - The Ninth Book by Gav Thorpe
  - The Gods Demand by Josh Reynolds (originally published 2011 in Hammer and Bolter issue 11)
  - Plague Doktor by C. L. Werner
  - The City is Theirs by Philip Athans
  - The Second Sun by Ben Counter
  - Aenarion by Gav Thorpe (originally published 2010 as an audio drama)
- 15th Birthday Collection (2012, ISBN 9780857876683)
  - Blood Blessing by S. P. Cawkwell
  - Blood Sport by Josh Reynolds
  - Cankerworm by Darius Hinks
  - Voices by David Guymer
  - Gilead's Craft by Nik Vincent
  - Sword Guardian by Graham McNeill
- Black Library Games Day Anthology 2011/12
  - The March of Doom by Chris Wraight
  - Plague Priest by C. L. Werner
- Black Library Games Day Anthology 2012/13
  - Master of Mourkain by Josh Reynolds
- Black Library Weekender: Volume One (2012, ISBN 9781849703543)
  - Gods of Flesh and Blood by Graham McNeill
  - Berthold's Beard by Josh Reynolds
- Black Library Weekender: Volume Two (2012, ISBN 9781849703703)
  - The Great Maw by L. J. Goulding
  - Bloodwalker by C. L. Werner
- Advent Calendar 2012 eBundle (2013, ISBN 9780857879615)
  - The Riddle of Scorpions by Josh Reynolds (2012)
  - Never Forgive by Gav Thorpe (2012)
  - Thanquol Triumphant by C. L. Werner (2012)
  - Voyage of the Sunspear by Ben Counter (2012)
  - The Contest by Jordan Ellinger (2012)
  - The Last Little Bit by Robert Earl (2012)
  - Like Father, Like Son by Mark Latham (2012)
- Inferno! Volume 1 (2018, ISBN 9781784967338)
  - Waking the Dragon by Josh Reynolds
  - How Vido Learned the Trick by Josh Reynolds

=== Other stories ===
==== White Dwarf magazine ====
- Issue 117 (1989)
  - No Gold in the Grey Mountains by Kim Newman under the pen name Jack Yeovil (preview of Warhammer: Wolf Riders)
- Issue 136 (1991)
  - The Magician's Son by Barrington J. Bayley
- Issue 142 (1991)
  - The Black Sail by Neil McIntosh
- Issue 152 (1992)
  - Skaven's Claw Part 1 by William King
- Issue 153 (1992)
  - Skaven's Claw Part 2 by William King

==== Apocrypha Now ====
- Fire & Earth by James Wallis (1995, ISBN 1899749039)

==== Inferno! magazine ====
- Issue Zero (White Dwarf issue 210, 1997)
  - The Hounds of Winter by Jonathan Green
- Issue 1 (1997, ISBN 1869893301)
  - The Mutant Master by William King
  - Grunsonn's Marauders by Andy Jones
- Issue 2 (1997, ISBN 186989331X)
  - Hatred by Ben Chessel
  - Birth of a Legend by Gav Thorpe
- Issue 3 (1997, ISBN 1869893328)
  - Gilead's Wake by Dan Abnett
  - The Faithful Servant by Gav Thorpe
- Issue 4 (1998, ISBN 1869893336)
  - Paradise Lost by Andy Jones
- Issue 5 (1998, ISBN 1869893344)
  - The Dead Among Us by James Wallis
  - Dark Heart by Jonathan Green
- Issue 6 (1998)
  - Mormacar's Lament by Chris Pramas
- Issue 7 (1998)
  - A Company of Wolves by Dan Abnett
  - The Chaos Beneath by Mark Brendan
- Issue 8 (1998, ISBN 1869893379)
  - Gilead's Fate by Dan Abnett
- Issue 9 (1998, ISBN 186989359X)
  - Wolf in the Fold by Ben Chessel
  - Wolf in Sheep's Clothing by Dan Abnett
- Issue 10 (1999, ISBN 1869893603)
  - The Affair of the Araby Exhibit by Gordon Rennie
- Issue 11 (1999, ISBN 1869893611)
  - Ulric's Children by William King
  - The Blessed Ones by Rani Kellock
- Issue 12 (1999, ISBN 186989362X)
  - The Doorway Between by Rjurik Davidson
- Issue 13 (1999, ISBN 1869893727)
  - Gilead's Test by Dan Abnett
  - The Bretonnian Connection by James Wallis
- Issue 14 (1999, ISBN 1869893735)
  - Red Moon Over Altdorf by Gordon Rennie
- Issue 15 (1999, ISBN 1869893743)
  - A Gentleman's War by Neil Rutledge
  - The Judas Goat by Robert Earl
- Issue 16 (1999, ISBN 1841541117)
  - The Ultimate Ritual by Neil Jones and William King
- Issue 17 (2000, ISBN 1841541125)
  - Faith by Robert Earl
  - Who Mourns a Necromancer? by Brian Stableford under the pen name Brian Craig
- Issue 18 (2000, ISBN 1841541133)
  - Tybalt's Quest by Gav Thorpe
- Issue 19 (2000, ISBN 1841541141)
- Issue 20 (2000, ISBN 184154115X)
  - The Gifts of Tal Dur by Neil McIntosh
  - The Plague Pit by Jonathan Green
- Issue 21 (2000, ISBN 184154129X)
  - The Sound Which Wakes You by Ben Chessel
  - Son and Heir by Ian Winterton
  - Portrait of My Undying Lady by Gordon Rennie
- Issue 22 (2001, ISBN 1841541303)
  - A Choice of Hatreds by C. L. Werner
- Issue 23 (2001, ISBN 1841541311)
  - Debt of Blood by Neil McIntosh
  - Ancestral Honour by Gav Thorpe
- Issue 24 (2001, ISBN 184154132X)
  - Jahama's Lesson by Matthew Farrer
- Issue 25 (2001, ISBN 1841541338)
  - The Ambassador by Graham McNeill
  - Tybalt's Battle by Gav Thorpe
  - A Fool's Bargain by Brian Maycock
  - The Deep by Rjurik Davidson
- Issue 26 (2001, ISBN 1841542148)
  - The Winter Wind by Brian Stableford under the pen name Brian Craig
  - The Small Ones by C. L. Werner
- Issue 27 (2001, ISBN 1841542156)
  - The Nagenhof Bell by Jonathan Green
  - Totentanz by Brian Stableford under the pen name Brian Craig
- Issue 28 (2002, ISBN 1841542164)
  - Meat & Bone by Robin D. Laws
- Issue 29 (2002, ISBN 1841542466)
  - The Doom that Came to Wulfhafen by C. L. Werner
  - Three Knights by Graham McNeill
- Issue 30 (2002, ISBN 1841542474)
- Issue 31 (2002, ISBN 1841542482)
  - Head Hunting by Robin D. Laws
  - A Matter of Evidence by Brian Stableford under the pen name Brian Craig
- Issue 32 (2002, ISBN 1841542490)
  - A Good Thief by Simon Jowett
  - Rest for the Wicked by James Wallis
- Issue 33 (2002, ISBN 1841542504)
  - What Price Vengeance? by C. L. Werner
  - The Path of Warriors by Neil McIntosh
- Issue 34 (2003, ISBN 1841542512)
  - Glow by Si Spurrier
  - Mark of the Beast by Jonathan Green
- Issue 35 (2003, ISBN 1841542520)
  - A Ship Called Rumour by Dan Abnett
  - Meat Wagon by C. L. Werner
- Issue 36 (2003, ISBN 1844160319)
  - Redhand's Daughter by William King
- Issue 37 (2003, ISBN 1844160327)
  - The Doom of the Sacramento by Dan Abnett
  - Night Too Long by James Wallis
- Issue 38 (2003, ISBN 1844160335)
  - Dry Land and Clean Drinking by Dan Abnett
  - The Sleep of the Dead by Darius Hinks
- Issue 39 (2003, ISBN 1844160343)
  - Threading the Teeth by Dan Abnett
  - Wind of Change by C. L. Werner
- Issue 40 (2004, ISBN 1844160351)
  - Cold Light of Day by Rob Sanders
  - Perfect Assassin by Nick Kyme
- Issue 41 (2004, ISBN 184416036X)
  - The Vampire Hunters by Robert Earl
  - Vespertine by David Griffiths
- Issue 42 (2004, ISBN 1844160378)
  - A Storm Rising by Nick Kyme
  - The Hanging Tree by Jonathan Green
- Issue 43 (2004, ISBN 1844160386)
  - The Seventh Boon by Mitchell Scanlon
  - The Cuckoo of Hammerbilt by James Peaty
  - To Guard the Dead by Brian Maycock
- Issue 44 (2004, ISBN 1844160394)
- Issue 45 (2004, ISBN 1844161404)
  - Rattenkrieg by Robert Earl
  - As Dead as Flesh by Nick Kyme
- Issue 46 (2005, ISBN 1844161412)
  - Hetzau's Follies by Nathan Long
  - Sickhouse by C. L. Werner

==== Hammer and Bolter ====
- Issue 1 (2010)
  - A Place of Quiet Assembly by John Brunner
  - Questing Knight by Anthony Reynolds
- Issue 2 (2010)
  - The Dark Path by Gav Thorpe (originally published in the Black Library Live! 2009 Chapbook)
  - The Rat Catcher's Tail by Richard Ford
- Issue 3 (2010)
  - Virtue's Reward by Darius Hinks (originally published 2010 in War Unending)
  - Charandis by Ben McCallum
- Issue 4 (2011)
  - The Barbed-Wire Cat by Robert Earl
- Issue 5 (2011)
  - Feast of Horrors by Chris Wraight (originally published in the Black Library Live! 2010 Chapbook)
- Issue 6 (2011)
  - The First Duty by Josh Reynolds
  - Grail Knight by Anthony Reynolds
- Issue 7 (2011)
  - Manbane by Andy Hoare
- Issue 8 (2011)
  - Marshlight by C. L. Werner
- Issue 9 (2011)
  - Sir Dagobert's Last Battle by Jonathan Green
- Issue 10 (2011)
  - Mountain Eater by Andy Smillie
  - The Last Charge by Andy Hoare
- Issue 11 (2011)
  - The Gods Demand by Josh Reynolds
- Issue 12 (2011)
  - Aenarion by Gav Thorpe (originally published 2010 as an audio drama)
- Issue 13 (2011)
  - Dead Calm by Josh Reynolds
- Issue 14 (2011)
  - The Tilean's Talisman by David Guymer
- Issue 15 (2011)
- Issue 16 (2012)
- Issue 17 (2012)
  - Stromfel's Teeth by Josh Reynolds
- Issue 18 (2012)
  - The Oberwald Ripper by L. J. Goulding
  - Slayer of the Storm God by Nathan Long (originally published 2009 as an audio drama)
- Issue 19 (2012)
- Issue 20 (2012)
  - The Talon of Khorne by Frank Cavallo
  - Lords of the Marsh by Josh Reynolds
- Issue 21 (2012)
  - Dead Man's Party by Josh Reynolds
- Issue 22 (2012)
  - Butcher's Beast by Jordan Ellinger
  - Leechlord by Frank Cavallo
- Issue 23 (2012)
  - The Hunter by Graeme Lyon
  - Let the Great Axe Fall Part 1 by Graham McNeill
- Issue 24 (2012)
  - Let the Great Axe Fall Part 2 by Graham McNeill
- Issue 25 (2012)
  - The Court Beneath by Phil Kelly
  - The Problem of Three-Toll Bridge by Josh Reynolds
- Issue 26 (2012)
  - The Fangs of the Asp by Josh Reynolds

==== E-shorts ====
- Unseen by David Guymer (2013, ISBN 9781782510154)
- Golfgag's Revenge by Justin D. Hill (2013, ISBN 9781782510246)
- Tomb of the Golden Idol: Part 1 by Andy Hoare (2013, ISBN 9781782512066)
- Tomb of the Golden Idol: Part 2 by Andy Hoare (2013, ISBN 9781782512073)
- Ghoul King 1: Conqueror of Worms by Josh Reynolds (2014, ISBN 9781782512523)
- Ghoul King 2: Empire of Maggots by Josh Reynolds (2014, ISBN 9781782512530)
- Sticks and Stones by Jonathan Green (2014, ISBN 9781782515999)
- The Battle of Whitestone by Justin D. Hill (2014, ISBN 9781782516026)

==== Total War: Warhammer stories ====
- The Peasant Knight
- The Nocturne for Mousillon
- The Epic Saga of Wulfrick the Sarl
- All Tunnels Lead to Skavenblight by Andy Hall and Chris Gambold (2017)
- The Forked Tongue by Andy Hall and Chris Gambold (2017)
- The Mage and the Sorceress by Andy Hall and Chris Gambold
- Prince of Altdorf by Andy Hall (2017)
- The Siren of the Storm by Andy Hall (2018)
- Son of Kislev by Andy Hall (2022)
- Master of the Meteor Wind by David Guymer (2023)
- Things in the Wood by David Guymer (2024)

== Path to Victory gamebooks ==
- Beneath the City of the White Wolf by M. F. Bradshaw (2012, ISBN 9781849701679)
- Shadows over Sylvania by Jonathan Green (2013, ISBN 9781849703437)

== Warhammer Fantasy background books ==
- The Loathsome Ratmen by Mitchel Scanlon (2004, ISBN 1844161161)
- Blood on the Reik by Matt Ralphs (2005, ISBN 1844160971)
- The Life of Sigmar by Matt Ralphs (2005, ISBN 9781844162505)
- Liber Chaotica by Marijan von Staufer and Richard Williams (2006, ISBN 9781844163946)
- Liber Necris by Alessio Cavatore, Jervis Johnson, William King, Tuomas Pirinen, and Marijan von Staufer (2006, ISBN 9781844163380)
- The Empire at War by Matt Ralphs (2006, ISBN 9781844164158)
- The Witch Hunter's Handbook by Darius Hinks (2006, ISBN 9781844164073, reissue 2022, ISBN 9781789992168)
- Warhammer Quiz Book by Adam Troke (2007, ISBN 9781844164141)
- Grudgelore by Nick Kyme and Gav Thorpe (2008, ISBN 9781844165032)

== Warhammer Fantasy graphic novels ==
- Ulli & Marquand (2002, ISBN 1841542113)
- The Complete Tales from the Ten-Tailed Cat edited by Marc Gascoigne and Christian Dunn (2005, ISBN 1844161455)
- The Call of Chaos edited by Marc Gascoigne, Andy Jones, and Christian Dunn (2005, ISBN 1844161447)
- Darkblade: Reign of Blood by Dan Abnett and Kev Hopgood (2005, ISBN 1844162060), reissued with an additional story as Darkblade, The graphic novel (2011, ISBN 9781844168347)
  - Darkblade Book I: Born of Blood (2000, ISBN 1841541249)
  - Darkblade Book II: World of Blood (2001, ISBN 1841541478)
  - Darkblade Book III: Throne of Blood (2003, ISBN 1841542415)
  - Darkblade Book IV: Banner of Blood
- Hellbrandt Grimm by Mitchel Scanlon and the Sharp Brothers (2005, ISBN 9781844162079)
- Blood of the Empire (2008, ISBN 9781934506721)
  - Forge of War by Dan Abnett and Ian Edginton (2007, reissue 2016, ISBN 9781784964634)
  - Condemned by Fire by Dan Abnett and Ian Edginton (2008, reissue 2016, ISBN 9781784964610)
  - Crown of Destruction by Kieron Gillen (2008, reissue 2016, ISBN 9781784964665)
- Warhammer Online: Prelude To War by Graham McNeill (2008, published as part of the collector's edition of Warhammer Online: Age of Reckoning)

== Blood Bowl ==
=== The Blood Bowl Omnibus ===
These novels were authored by Matt Forbeck and collected in omnibus in 2007 and 2020 (ISBN 9781789999426).

- Blood Bowl (2005)
- Dead Ball (2005)
- Death Match (2006)
- Rumble in the Jungle (2007)
- A Guide to Blood Bowl

=== Death on the Pitch ===
These short stories were collected in omnibus in 2018 (ISBN 9781784968328) and with two additional short stories in 2020 (ISBN 9781789991895).

- Manglers Never Lose by Josh Reynolds
- Fixed by Robbie MacNiven
- Da Bank Job by Andy Hall
- The Hack Attack by Matt Forbeck
- Mazlocke's Cantrip of Superior Substitution by Graeme Lyon
- Pride and Penitence by Alex Worley
- The Skeleton Key by David Annandale
- Scrape to Victory by Gav Thorpe
- Doc Morgrim's Vow by Josh Reynolds
- A Last Sniff of Glory by David Guymer
- Foul Play by Andy Hall
- Hoppo's Pies by Guy Haley
- The Freelancer by Robert Rath
- Dismember the Titans by Graeme Lyon (originally published 2019 in Inferno! Volume 3, ISBN 9781784969295)

=== Blood Bowl Comics ===
- Blood Bowl: Killer Contract by Matt Forbeck and Lads Helloven (2008, ISBN 9781934506349)
- Blood Bowl: More Guts, More Glory by Nick Kyme and Jack Jadson (2018, ISBN 9781785858628)

== Warhammer Age of Sigmar ==
=== The Realmgate Wars: Volume 1 ===
These novels and short story were collected in omnibus in 2018 (ISBN 9781784967574).

- The Gates of Azyr by Chris Wraight (2015)
- War Storm (2015)
  - Borne by the Storm by Nick Kyme
  - Storm of Blades by Guy Haley
  - The Gates of Dawn by Josh Reynolds
- Ghal Maraz (2015)
  - War in the Hidden Vale by Josh Reynolds
  - The Eldritch Fortress by Guy Haley
- Hammers of Sigmar (2015)
  - Stormcast by Darius Hinks
  - Scion of the Storm by C. L. Werner
- Wardens of the Everqueen by C. L. Werner (2016)
- Black Rift by Josh Reynolds (2016)
- Pantheon by Guy Haley (short story, 2016)

=== The Realmgate Wars: Volume 2 ===
These novels and short stories were collected in omnibus in 2018 (ISBN 9781784967666).

- Warbeast by Gav Thorpe (2016)
- Call of Archaon (2015)
  - Beneath the Black Thumb by David Guymer (short story)
  - Eye of the Storm by Rob Sanders (short story)
  - The Solace of Rage by Guy Haley (short story)
  - Knight of Corruption by David Annandale (short story)
  - The Trial of the Chosen by Guy Haley (short story)
  - In the Lands of the Blind by Rob Sanders (short story)
  - Blood and Plague by David Annandale (short story)
  - See No Evil by Rob Sanders (short story)
- Fury of Gork by Josh Reynolds (2016)
- Bladestorm by Matt Westbrook (2016)
- Mortarch of Night (originally published 2015 as an audio drama)
  - The Prisoner of the Black Sun by Josh Reynold (short story)
  - Sands of Blood by Josh Reynold (short story)
  - The Lords of Helstone by Josh Reynold (short story)
  - Bridge of Seven Sorrows by Josh Reynold (short story)
  - The Beasts of Cartha by David Guymer (short story)
  - Fist of Mork, Fist of Gork by David Guymer (short story)
  - Great Red by David Guymer (short story)
  - Only the Faithful by David Guymer (short story)
- Lord of Undeath by C. L. Werner (2016)

=== Legends of the Age of Sigmar ===
These novels were collected in omnibus in 2017 (ISBN 9781784964474).

- Fyreslayers (2016)
  - Four Thousand Days by David Guymer
  - The Keys to Ruin by David Annandale
  - Shattered Crucible by David Annandale
  - The Volturung Road by Guy Haley
- Skaven Pestilens by Josh Reynolds (2016)
- Sylvaneth (2016)
  - The Resolute by Josh Reynolds
  - Heartwood by Robbie MacNiven
  - The Splintered by Rob Sanders
  - Wrathspring by Gav Thorpe
  - The Outcast by Josh Reynolds

=== Age of Sigmar novels ===
- Nagash: The Undying King by Josh Reynolds (2018)
- Soul Wars by Josh Reynolds (2018)
- Callis & Toll: The Silver Shard by Nick Horth (2018)
- The Tainted Heart by C. L. Werner (2018)
- Scourge of Fate by Robbie MacNiven (2018)
- Hamilcar: Champion of the Gods by David Guymer (2019)
- Gloomspite by Andy Clark (2019)
- The Court of the Blind King by David Guymer (2019)
- Lady of Sorrows by C. L. Werner (2020)
- Realm-Lords by Dale Lucas (2020)
- Sons of Behemat by Graeme Lyon (audio drama, 2020)
- Warcry Catacombs: Blood of the Everchosen by Richard Strachan (2020)
- Heirs of Grimnir (audio drama, 2020)
- Covens of Blood by Anna Stephens, Liane Merciel, and Jamie Crisalli (2020)
- Bonereapers by David Guymer (2020)
- Stormvault by Andy Clark (2021)
- The End of Enlightenment by Richard Strachan (2021)
- Cursed City by C. L. Werner (2021)
- A Dynasty of Monsters by David Annandale (2021)
- Dominion by Darius Hinks (2021)
- Kragnos: Avatar of Destruction by David Guymer (2022)
- Hallowed Ground by Richard Strachan (2022)
- Godsbane by Dale Lucas (2022)
- Prince Maesa by Guy Haley (2022)
- The Vulture Lord by Richard Strachan (2022)
- The Hollow King by John French (2022)
- The Arkanaut's Oath by Guy Haley (2022)
- Hammers of Sigmar: First Forged by Richard Strachan (2022)
- Godeater's Son by Noah Van Nguyen (2023)
- Bad Loon Rising by Andy Clark (2023)
- The Last Volari by Gary Kloster (2023)
- Children of Teclis by Evan Dicken (2023)
- Yndrasta: The Celestial Spear by Noah Van Nguyen (2023)
- Temple of Silence by Richard Strachan (2023)
- The Ghosts of Barak-Minoz by Guy Haley (2024)
- Callis & Toll by David Annandale (2024)
- Skaventide by Gary Kloster (2024)
- Darkoath by Chris Thursten (2024)
- The Dead Kingdom by John French (2024)
- Lioness of the Parch by Evan Dicken (2024)
- Anvils of the Heldenhammer: The Ancients by Dale Lucas (2024)
- Starseer's Ruin by Adrian Tchaikovsky (2025)
- Ushoran – Mortarch of Delusion by Dale Lucas (2025)
- Abraxia: Spear of the Everchosen by Chris Thursten (2025)
- Queen of the Rose Throne by Gary Kloster (2025)
- Shade of Khaine by Evan Dicken (2025)
- First Marshal by Evan Dicken (2026)
- Blood of the Godeater by Noah Van Nguyen (2026)
- Whisperblade by Hal Wilson (2026)
- Herald of the Horned Rat by Robbie MacNiven (2026)

=== Age of Sigmar anthologies ===
- Call of Chaos (2015)
- Hammerhal & Other Stories (2017)
- Sacrosanct & Other Stories (2018)
- Gods and Mortals (2019)
- Myths & Revenants (2019)
- Warcry (2019)
- Oaths and Conquests (2020)
- Direchasm (2020)
- Champions of the Mortal Realms (2021)
- Thunderstrike & Other Stories (2021)
- Harrowdeep (2022)
- Grombrindal: Chronicles of the Wanderer (2022)
- Conquest Unbound (2022)
- Untamed Realms (2023)
- On the Shoulders of Giants and Other Stories (2024)
- Grombrindal: Ancestor's Burden (2025)
- Grombrindal: The Legend of the White Dwarf (2026)

=== Blacktalon ===
- First Mark by Andy Clark (2018)
- Blacktalon by Liane Merciel (2023)
- Shadow of the Silver Wolf by Gary Kloster (2026)

=== Eight Lamentations ===
- Spear of Shadows by Josh Reynolds (2017)
- War-Claw by Josh Reynolds (audio drama, 2018)

=== Gotrek Gurnisson ===
- Realmslayer by David Guymer (audio drama, 2018, hardcover 2019, ISBN 9781781939406)
- One, Untended by David Guymer (2018)
- Realmslayer: Blood of the Old World by David Guymer (audio drama, 2019)
- Blightslayer by Richard Strachan (2023, paperback 2024, ISBN 9781804073551)
- Realmslayer: Legend of the Doomseeker by David Guymer (2023)
- Verminslayer by David Guymer (2025)

=== Gotrek and Maleneth: The Omnibus ===
These novels and short stories were collected in omnibus in 2022 (ISBN 9781804071779) and with additional short stories in 2025 (ISBN 9781804071779).

- The Bone Desert by Robbie MacNiven (short story, 2018)
- The Neverspike by Darius Hinks (short story, 2018)
- Ghoulslayer by Darius Hinks (2019, paperback 2020, ISBN 9781789990553)
- Gitslayer by Darius Hinks (2021, ISBN 9781789992090, paperback 2022, ISBN 9781800261044)
- Death on the Road to Svardheim by Darius Hinks (short story, 2020)
- Soulslayer by Darius Hinks (2022, paperback 2023, ISBN 9781800262478)
- The Crown of Karak-Khazhar by Darius Hinks (short story, 2022)
- The Dead Hours by David Guymer (short story, 2020)

=== Hallowed Knights ===
- Plague Garden by Josh Reynolds (2017)
- Black Pyramid by Josh Reynolds (2018)
- The Denied by Josh Reynolds (audio drama, 2018)

=== Kharadron Overlords ===
- Overlords of the Iron Dragon by C. L. Werner (2017)
- Profit's Ruin by C. L. Werner (2020)
- City of Secrets by Nick Horth (2017)

=== Neferata ===
- Mortarch of Blood by David Annandale (2018)
- The Dominion of Bones by David Annandale (2019)

=== The Khul ===
- The Red Feast by Gav Thorpe (2019)

=== Warhammer Underworlds ===
- Shadespire: The Mirrored City by Josh Reynolds (2018)
- Beastgrave by C. L. Werner (2019)
- Shadespire: The Darkness in the Glass by David Annandale, David Guymer, Guy Haley (audio drama, 2018)
- The Palace of Memories and other stories by David Annandale, David Guymer, Guy Haley (audio drama, 2019)

=== Warhammer Horror ===
- Castle of Blood by C. L. Werner (2019)
- Dark Harvest by Josh Reynolds (2019)
- Gothghul Hollow by Anna Stephens (2020)
- Briardark by C. L. Werner (2022)
- Black-Eyed Saint by Dale Lucas (2023)
