= List of Warhammer 40,000 novels =

After the 1987 release of Games Workshop's Warhammer 40,000 wargame, a military and science fantasy universe set in the far future, the company began publishing background literature to expand on existing material, introduce new content, and provide detailed descriptions of the universe, its characters, and its events.

Since 1997, most of the background literature has been published by the affiliated imprint Black Library. An expanding roster of authors contributes to a growing collection of fiction across various formats and media, including audio, digital and print. These works, which range from full-length novels and novellas, to short stories, graphic novels, and audio dramas, are parts of named book series.

== The Horus Heresy ==
=== Novel series ===
- Book 001 - Horus Rising by Dan Abnett (2006, reissue 2018, ISBN 9781849707435)
- Book 002 - False Gods by Graham McNeill (June 2006)
- Book 003 - Galaxy in Flames by Ben Counter (October 2006)
- Book 004 - The Flight of the Eisenstein by James Swallow (March 2007)
- Book 005 - Fulgrim by Graham McNeill (July 2007)
- Book 006 - Descent of Angels by Mitchel Scanlon (October 2007)
- Book 007 - Legion by Dan Abnett (March 2008)
- Book 008 - Battle for the Abyss by Ben Counter (August 2008)
- Book 009 - Mechanicum by Graham McNeill (December 2008)
- Book 010 - Tales of Heresy by "various authors", edited by Nick Kyme and Lindsey Priestley (anthology) (April 2009)
- Book 011 - Fallen Angels by Mike Lee (July 2009)
- Book 012 - A Thousand Sons by Graham McNeill (March 2010)
- Book 013 - Nemesis by James Swallow (August 2010)
- Book 014 - The First Heretic by Aaron Dembski-Bowden (November 2010)
- Book 015 - Prospero Burns by Dan Abnett (January 2011)
- Book 016 - Age of Darkness by "various authors", edited by Christian Dunn (anthology) (May 2011)
- Book 017 - The Outcast Dead by Graham McNeill (November 2011)
- Book 018 - Deliverance Lost by Gav Thorpe (January 2012)
- Book 019 - Know No Fear by Dan Abnett (February 2012)
- Book 020 - The Primarchs by "various authors", edited by Christian Dunn (anthology) (May 2012)
- Book 021 - Fear to Tread by James Swallow (August 2012)
- Book 022 - Shadows of Treachery by "various authors", edited by Christian Dunn and Nick Kyme (anthology) (September 2012)
- Book 023 - Angel Exterminatus by Graham McNeill (January 2013)
- Book 024 - Betrayer by Aaron Dembski-Bowden (March 2013)
- Book 025 - Mark of Calth by "various authors", edited by Laurie Goulding (anthology) (April 2013)
- Book 026 - Vulkan Lives by Nick Kyme (August 2013)
- Book 027 - The Unremembered Empire by Dan Abnett (January 2014)
- Book 028 - Scars by Chris Wraight (April 2014)
- Book 029 - Vengeful Spirit by Graham McNeill (May 2014)
- Book 030 - The Damnation of Pythos by David Annandale (November 2014)
- Book 031 - Legacies of Betrayal by "various authors", edited by Graham McNeill (anthology) (February 2015)
- Book 032 - Deathfire by Nick Kyme (November 2015)
- Book 033 - War Without End by "various authors" (anthology) (January 2016)
- Book 034 - Pharos by Guy Haley (February 2016)
- Book 035 - Eye of Terra by "various authors" (anthology) (March 2016)
- Book 036 - The Path of Heaven by Chris Wraight (April 2016)
- Book 037 - The Silent War by "various authors", edited by Laurie Goulding (anthology) (May 2016)
- Book 038 - Angels of Caliban by Gav Thorpe (June 2016)
- Book 039 - Praetorian of Dorn by John French (August 2016)
- Book 040 - Corax by Gav Thorpe (anthology) (October 2016)
- Book 041 - The Master of Mankind by Aaron Dembski-Bowden (December 2016)
- Book 042 - Garro by James Swallow (anthology) (February 2017)
- Book 043 - Shattered Legions by "various authors", edited by Laurie Goulding (anthology) (April 2017)
- Book 044 - The Crimson King by Graham McNeill (June 2017)
- Book 045 - Tallarn by John French (anthology) (August 2017)
- Book 046 - Ruinstorm by David Annandale (October 2017)
- Book 047 - Old Earth by Nick Kyme (December 2017)
- Book 048 - The Burden of Loyalty edited by Laurie Goulding (anthology) (contains the novellas The Wolf King (Chris Wraight) and Cybernetica (Rob Sanders) as well as the short stories "Perpetual" (Dan Abnett), "The Binary Succession" (David Annandale), "Into Exile" (Aaron Dembski-Bowden), "Ordo Sinister" (John French), "The Heart of Pharos" (L J Goulding), and "The Thirteenth Wolf" (Gav Thorpe)) (February 2018)
- Book 049 - Wolfsbane by Guy Haley (May 2018)
- Book 050 - Born of Flame by Nick Kyme (anthology) (June 2018)
- Book 051 - Slaves to Darkness by John French (August 2018)
- Book 052 - Heralds of the Siege by "various authors", edited by Nick Kyme and Laurie Goulding (anthology) (October 2018)
- Book 053 - Titandeath by Guy Haley (December 2018)
- Book 054 - The Buried Dagger by James Swallow (February 2019)

The saga chronologically continued with the Siege of Terra novels.

=== Siege of Terra novel series ===
- Book 001 - The Solar War by John French (May 2019)
- Book 002 - The Lost and the Damned by Guy Haley (October 2019)
- Book 003 - The First Wall by Gav Thorpe (March 2020)
- Book 004 - Saturnine by Dan Abnett (June 2020)
- Book 005 - Mortis by John French (January 2021)
- Book 006 - Warhawk by Chris Wraight (October 2021)
- Book 007 - Echoes of Eternity by Aaron Dembski-Bowden (September 2022)
- Book 008 - The End and the Death: Volume I by Dan Abnett (February 2023)
- Book 009 - The End and the Death: Volume II by Dan Abnett (November 2023)
- Book 010 - The End and the Death: Volume III by Dan Abnett (January 2024)

=== Primarchs of The Horus Heresy ===
- Roboute Guilliman: Lord of Ultramar by David Annandale (short novel) (2016)
- Leman Russ: The Great Wolf by Chris Wraight (short novel) (2017)
- Magnus the Red: Master of Prospero by Graham McNeill (short novel) (2017)
- Perturabo: The Hammer of Olympia by Guy Haley (short novel) (2017)
- Lorgar: Bearer of the Word by Gav Thorpe (short novel) (2017)
- Fulgrim: The Palatine Phoenix by Josh Reynolds (short novel) (2018)
- Ferrus Manus: The Gorgon of Medusa by David Guymer (short novel) (2018)
- Jaghatai Khan: Warhawk of Chogoris by Chris Wraight (short novel) (2018)
- Vulkan: Lord of Drakes by David Annandale (short novel) (2018)
- Corax: Lord of Shadows by Guy Haley (short novel) (2018)
- Angron: Slave of Nuceria by Ian St. Martin (short novel) (2019)
- Konrad Curze: The Night Haunter by Guy Haley (short novel) (2019)
- Lion El'Jonson: Lord of the First by David Guymer (short novel) (2020)
- Alpharius: Head of the Hydra by Mike Brooks (short novel) (2021)
- Mortarion: The Pale King by David Annandale (short novel) (2022)
- Rogal Dorn: The Emperor's Crusader by Gav Thorpe (short novel) (2022)
- Sanguinius: The Great Angel by Chris Wraight (short novel) (2022)
- Sons of the Emperor by "various" (anthology) (2018)
- The Lords of Terra by "various" (audio anthology) (2018)
- Scions of the Emperor by "various" (anthology) (2019)
- Blood of the Emperor by "various" (anthology) (2021)

=== The Scouring novel series ===
- Book 001 - Ashes of the Imperium by Chris Wraight (2025)
- Book 002 - Wrath of Terra by John French (2026)

=== Other characters from The Horus Heresy ===
- Valdor: Birth of the Imperium by Chris Wraight (novel) (February 2020)
- Luther: First of the Fallen by Gav Thorpe (novel) (March 2021)
- Sigismund: The Eternal Crusader by John French (novel) (May 2022)
- Eidolon: The Auric Hammer by Marc Collins (novel) (October 2024)
- Zardu Layak: The Crimson Apostle by Rich McCormick (novel) (2026)
- Raldoron: Revenant by Guy Haley (novel) (2026)

=== Other novels and anthologies ===
- Lupercal's War by "various authors" (anthology) (2022)
- Cthonia's Reckoning by "various authors" (anthology) (2022)
- Dropsite Massacre by John French (2025)

=== Novellas ===
- Promethean Sun by Nick Kyme (limited edition) (May 2011) ... also included in the book no. 50
- Aurelian by Aaron Dembski-Bowden (limited edition) (October 2011) ... also included in the book no. 35
- The Reflection Crack'd by Graham McNeill (ebook) (May 2012) ... also included in the book no. 20
- Feat of Iron by Nick Kyme (ebook) (May 2012) ... also included in the book no. 20
- The Lion by Gav Thorpe (ebook) (May 2012) ... also included in the book no. 20
- The Serpent Beneath by Rob Sanders (ebook) (May 2012) ... also included in the book no. 20
- The Crimson Fist by John French (ebook) (July 2012) ... also included in the book no. 22
- Brotherhood of the Storm by Chris Wraight (limited edition) (October 2012) ... also included in the book no. 31
- Corax: Soulforge by Gav Thorpe (limited edition) (April 2013) ... also included in the book no. 40
- Scorched Earth by Nick Kyme (short novel) (September 2013) ... also included in the book no. 50
- Macragge's Honour by Dan Abnett (limited graphic novel) (November 2013)
- Tallarn: Executioner by John French (short novel) (November 2013) ... also included in the book no. 45
- Ravenlord by Gav Thorpe (short novel) (May 2014) ... also included in the book no. 40
- The Purge by Anthony Reynolds (limited edition) (July 2014) ... also included in the book no. 37
- The Seventh Serpent by Graham McNeill (limited edition) (December 2014) ... also included in the book no. 43
- Tallarn: Ironclad by John French (limited edition) (February 2015) ... also included in the book no. 45
- Cybernetica by Rob Sanders (limited edition) (July 2015) ... also included in the book no. 48
- Wolf King by Chris Wraight (limited edition) (October 2015) ... also included in the book no. 48
- The Honoured by Rob Sanders (ebook) (November 2015)
- The Unburdened by David Annandale (ebook) (November 2015)
- Garro: Vow of Faith by James Swallow (limited edition) (December 2015) ... also included in the book no. 42
- Meduson: Ultimate Edition by "various artists" (anthology, limited edition) (May 2016) ... also included in the book no. 43
- Weregeld by Gav Thorpe (exclusive novel) (October 2016) ... also included in the book no. 40
- Sons of the Forge by Nick Kyme (limited edition) (November 2016) ... also included in the book no. 50

=== Siege of Terra novellas ===
- Sons of the Selenar by Graham McNeill (April 2020)
- Fury of Magnus by Graham McNeill (August 2020)
- Garro: Knight of Grey by James Swallow (2023)
- Era of Ruin by Various (anthology) (2025)

=== Audio Dramas ===
- The Dark King by Graham McNeill (June 2008) ... also included in the book no. 22
- The Lightning Tower by Dan Abnett (June 2008) ... also included in the book no. 22
- Raven's Flight by Gav Thorpe (February 2010) ... also included in the book no. 22
- Garro: Oath of Moment by James Swallow (December 2010) ... also included in the book no. 42
- Garro: Legion of One by James Swallow (April 2011) ... also included in the book no. 42
- Butcher's Nails by Aaron Dembski-Bowden (August 2012) ... also included in the book no. 31
- Grey Angel by John French (August 2012) ... also included in the book no. 37
- Prince of Crows by Aaron Dembski-Bowden (September 2012) ... also included in the book no. 22
- Garro: Burden of Duty by James Swallow (October 2012) ... also included in the book no. 42
- Warmaster by John French (special edition) (December 2012) ... also included in the book no. 31
- Strike and Fade by Guy Haley (special edition) (December 2012) ... also included in the book no. 31
- Veritas Ferrum by David Annandale (special edition) (December 2012) ... also included in the book no. 31
- Garro: Sword of Truth by James Swallow (December 2012) ... also included in the book no. 42
- The Sigillite by Chris Wraight (March 2013) ... also included in the book no. 37
- Wolf Hunt by Graham McNeill (May 2013) ... also included in the book no. 37
- Honour to the Dead by Gav Thorpe (September 2013) ... also included in the book no. 31
- Censure by Nick Kyme (October 2013) ... also included in the book no. 31
- Thief of Revelations by Graham McNeill (November 2013) ... also included in the book no. 31
- Khârn: The Eightfold Path by Anthony Reynolds (special edition) (December 2013) ... also included in the book no. 31
- Lucius: The Eternal Blade by Graham McNeill (special edition) (December 2013) ... also included in the book no. 31
- Cypher: Guardian of Order by Gav Thorpe (special edition) (December 2013) ... also included in the book no. 31
- Hunter's Moon by Guy Haley (January 2014) ... also included in the book no. 31
- Wolf's Claw by Chris Wraight (March 2014) ... also included in the book no. 31
- Master of the First by Gav Thorpe (October 2014) ... also included in the book no. 35
- Templar by John French (November 2014) ... also included in the book no. 37
- Garro: Shield of Lies by James Swallow (December 2014) ... also included in the book no. 42
- The Long Night by Aaron Dembski-Bowden (January 2015) ... also included in the book no. 35
- The Eagle's Talon by John French (January 2015) ... also included in the book no. 35
- Iron Corpses by David Annandale (February 2015) ... also included in the book no. 35
- Garro: Ashes of Fealty by James Swallow (February 2015) ... also included in the book no. 42
- Raptor by Gav Thorpe (June 2015) ... also included in the book no. 40
- Red-Marked by Nick Kyme (January 2016) ... also included in the book no. 35
- The Heart of the Pharos by L.J. Goulding (March 2016) ... also included in the book no. 48
- Echoes of Imperium by Andy Smillie, Nick Kyme, C.Z. Dunn & Gav Thorpe (the anthology includes "The Herald of Sanguinius" (also included in the book no. 35), "Stratagem" (also included in the book no. 35), "The Watcher" (also included in the book no. 37) & "The Shadowmasters" (also included in the book no. 40) (September 2016)
- Children of Sicarus by Anthony Reynolds (October 2016) ... also included in the book no. 52
- The Thirteenth Wolf by Gav Thorpe (November 2016) ... also included in the book no. 48
- Virtues of the Sons / Sins of the Father by Andy Smillie (January 2017) ... also included in the book no. 33 / also included in the book no. 35
- The Binary Succession by David Annandale (March 2017) ... also included in the book no. 48
- Echoes of Revelation by Dan Abnett, Chris Wraight & Gav Thorpe (the anthology includes "Perpetual" (also included in the book no. 48), "The soul, severed" (also included in the book no. 52) & "Valerius" (also included in the book no. 52) (May 2017)
- Dark Compliance by John French (July 2017) ... also included in the book no. 52
- Blackshields: The False War by Josh Reynolds (September 2017)
- Blackshields: The Red Fief by Josh Reynolds (May 2018)
- Hubris of Monarchia by Andy Smillie (December 2018)
- Nightfane by Nick Kyme (January 2019)
- Blackshields: The Broken Chain by Josh Reynolds (July 2019)

=== Omnibus ===
- Crusade's End (March 2016)

This omnibus edition contains the books Horus Rising, False Gods and Galaxy in Flames, and also the stories "The Wolf of Ash and Fire", "Lord of the Red Sands" and "Death of a Silversmith" included in book #35, #33, and #22 respectively

- The Last Phoenix (May 2016)

This omnibus edition contains the books Fulgrim and Angel Exterminatus, the novellas The Crimson Fist and The Reflection Crack'd, and also the stories "The Phoenician", "Iron Within", "Imperfect", "Chirurgeon" and "Lucius the Eternal Blade" included in book #22, #20, #33, #16, #33, #33, and #31 respectively

- The Razing of Prospero (July 2016)

This omnibus edition contains the books A Thousand Sons and Prospero Burns, and also the stories "Howl of the Hearthworld", "Rebirth", "Hunter's Moon" and "Thief of Revelations".

== The Beast Arises ==
- I Am Slaughter by Dan Abnett (January 2016)
- Predator, Prey by Rob Sanders (February 2016)
- The Emperor Expects by Gav Thorpe (March 2016)
- The Last Wall by David Annandale (April 2016)
- Throneworld by Guy Haley (May 2016)
- Echoes of the Long War by David Guymer (June 2016)
- The Hunt for Vulkan by David Annandale (July 2016)
- The Beast Must Die by Gav Thorpe (July 2016)
- Watchers in Death by David Annandale (August 2016)
- The Last Son of Dorn by David Guymer (September 2016)
- Shadow of Ullanor by Rob Sanders (October 2016)
- The Beheading by Guy Haley (November 2016)

== Adepta Sororitas ==
- Faith and Fire by James Swallow (novel) (March 2006)
- Red and Black by James Swallow (audio drama) (October 2011)
- Hammer and Anvil by James Swallow (novel) (December 2011)
- Celestine by Andy Clark (novel, limited) (January 2019)
- Our Martyred Lady by Gav Thorpe (audio drama, boxed set) (February 2019)
- Requiem Infernal by Peter Fehervari (novel) (April 2019)
- Mark of Faith by Rachel Harrison (novel) (November 2019)
- Broken Saints by Alec Worley (audio drama) (March 2020)
- The Book of Martyrs by Daniel Ware, Alec Worley & Phil Kelly (2021)
- Pilgrims of Fire by Justin D. Hill (novel) (March 2023)
- The Rose in Darkness by Danie Ware (novel) (2023)
- Daemonbreaker by Jude Reid (novel) (2024)
- Morvenn Vahl: Spear of Faith by Jude Reid (novel) (August 2024)
- Paragon of Faith and Other Stories by "various" (anthology) (2025)
- Aestred Thurga: Pyre of Faith by Danie Ware (novel) (2026)
- Sisters of Battle: The Omnibus by James Swallow (This omnibus contains the novels Faith and Fire and Hammer and Anvil as well as the prose version of the audio drama Red and Black and the short story "Heart & Soul".)
- Saints and Martyrs: An Adepta Sororitas Omnibus (This omnibus contains the stories "Celestine: The Living Saint" and "Celestine: Revelation" by Andy Clark, and "Ephrael Stern: The Heretic Saint" and "The Triumph of Saint Katherine" by Danie Ware.) (2024)

=== Short stories ===
- "Lesser Evils" by Toby Frost
- "Mercy" by Danie Ware
- "Soulfuel" by Rob Sanders

== Adeptus Mechanicus ==
=== Forge of Mars series ===
- Priests of Mars by Graham McNeill (novel 1) (July 2012)
- Lords of Mars by Graham McNeill (novel 2) (September 2013)
- Gods of Mars by Graham McNeill (novel 3) (November 2014)

=== Adeptus Mechanicus duology ===
- Adeptus Mechanicus : Skitarius by Rob Sanders (novel) (April 2015)
- Adeptus Mechanicus : Tech-Priest by Rob Sanders (novel) (June 2015)

=== Other stories ===
- Imperator: Wrath of the Omnissiah by Gav Thorpe (novel) (April 2018)
- Servants of the Machine-God by "various" (anthology) (August 2018)
- Belisarius Cawl: The Great Work by Guy Haley (novel) (September 2019)
- Day of Ascension by Adrian Tchaikovsky (February 2022)
- Dominion Genesis by Jonathan D. Beer (novel) (2024)
- Belisarius Cawl: Archmagos by Guy Haley (novel) (2025)

== Adeptus Titanicus ==
- Titanicus by Dan Abnett (novel) (October 2008)
- Warlord: Fury of the God-Machine by David Annandale (novel) (April 2017)
- Imperator: Wrath of the Omnissiah by Gav Thorpe (novel) (April 2018)
- God-Machines - A Warhammer 40,000 Omnibus (this omnibus contains the novels Imperator: Wrath of the Omnissiah(Gav Thorpe), Kingsblade (Andy Clark), Knightsblade (Andy Clark), and Warlord: Fury of the God-Machine (David Annandale). It also contains the novella Knights of the Imperium (Graham McNeill) and the short stories "Vengeance of the Immortal" (Gav Thorpe), "Gates of the Devourer" (David Annandale), "Becoming" (Andy Clark), "Defiant" (Andy Clark), and "Hunting Ground" (Ian St. Martin).)

== Aeldari ==
=== Path of the Eldar ===
Authored by Gav Thorpe

- Path of the Warrior (July 2010)
- Path of the Seer (September 2011)
- Path of the Outcast (September 2012)

=== Phoenix Lords ===
- Asurmen: Hand of Asuryan by Gav Thorpe (novel) (September 2016)
- Asurmen: The Darker Road by Gav Thorpe (audio drama) (February 2017)
- Jain Zar: The Storm of Silence by Gav Thorpe (novel) (April 2017)

=== Other stories ===
- Eldar Prophecy by Cassern S. Goto (February 2007)
- Voidscarred by Mike Brooks (October 2025)

== Aeronautica Imperialis ==
- Outgunned by Denny Flowers (novel) (2022)
- Above and Beyond by Denny Flowers (novel) (2024)

== Alpha Legion ==
- Truth is My Weapon by Justin D. Hill (short story) (November 2016)
- Shroud of Night by Andy Clark (novel) (July 2017)
- Sons of the Hydra by Rob Sanders (novel) (July 2018)
- The Brightest and Best by Mike Brooks (short story) (June 2022)
- Renegades: Harrowmaster by Mike Brooks (novel) (October 2022)
- The Long Promise: A Solomon Akurra Short Story by Mike Brooks (short story) (December 2023)
- Ghost Legion by Mike Brooks (novel) (February 2026)

== Astra Militarum ==
=== Novels ===
- Fifteen Hours by Mitchell Scanlon (June 2005)
- Death World by Steve Lyons (December 2006)
- Rebel Winter by Steve Parker (July 2007)
- Desert Raiders by Lucien Soulban (December 2007)
- Ice Guard by Steve Lyons (January 2009)
- Gunheads by Steve Parker (May 2009)
- Cadian Blood by Aaron Dembski-Bowden (October 2009)
- Redemption Corps by Rob Sanders (May 2010)
- Dead Men Walking by Steve Lyons (December 2010)
- Imperial Glory by Richard Williams (August 2011)
- Iron Guard by Mark Clapham (July 2012)
- Commissar by Andy Hoare (January 2013)
- Baneblade by Guy Haley (April 2013)
- Straken by Toby Frost (novel) (December 2014)
- Shadowsword by Guy Haley (novel) (October 2016)
- Honourbound: Severina Raine by Rachel Harrison (novel) (February 2019)
- Steel Tread by Andy Clark (novel) (December 2021)
- Traitor Rock by Justin D. Hill (novel) (2021)
- Catachan Devil by Justin Woolley (novel) (March 2022)
- Kasrkin by Edoardo Albert (novel) (2022)
- Witchbringer by Steven B. Fischer (novel) (December 2022)
- Creed: Ashes of Cadia by Jude Reid (novel) (2023)
- Longshot by Rob Young (novel) (August 2023)
- The Fall of Cadia by Robert Rath (novel) (August 2023)
- Shadow of the Eighth by Justin D. Hill (novel) (2023)
- Deathworlder by Victoria Hayward (novel) (April 2024)
- Leontus: Lord Solar by Rob Young (novel) (January 2025)
- Hell's Last by Justin D. Hill (novel) (2025)
- Final Deployment by R S Wilt (novel) (August 2025)
- Demolisher by Andy Clark (novel) (December 2025)
- Chem Dog by Callum Davis (novel) (2026)
- Ghosts of Cadia by Rob Young (novel) (2026)
- Voice of Command by Richard Swan (novel) (august 2026)
- Cold Covenant by Peter fehervari (novel) (august 2026)
- Auxilia by Russel Zimmerman (novel) (august 2026)
- Crucible of Fire by Tom R Pike (novel) (November 2026)

=== Death Korps of Krieg ===
- Krieg (novel) by Steve Lyons (December 2022)
- Siege of Vraks (novel) by Steve Lyons (June 2024)
- The Relentless Dead (novel) by Steve Lyons (October 2025)
- Death Rider (novel) by Rhuairidh James (February 2026)

=== Other stories ===
- Scions of Elysia by Chris Dows (audio drama) (June 2017)
- Renegades of Elysia by Chris Dows (audio drama) (December 2017)
- Martyrs of Elysia by Chris Dows (audio drama) (June 2018)
- Taker of Heads by Ian St. Martin (audio drama) (September 2018)
- Death and Duty by "various" (anthology) (2025)
- Veterans of the Fall by William Crowe (collection, 2026)

== Bastion Wars ==
Authored by Henry Zou

- Emperor's Mercy (August 2009)
- Flesh and Iron (April 2010)
- Blood Gorgons (March 2011)

== Black Templars ==
Authored by Jonathan Green

- Crusade for Armageddon (July 2003)
- Conquest of Armageddon (December 2005)

=== Other stories ===
- Bitter Salvage (September 2013)
- Visage of Zeal (September 2013)
- The Emperor’s Chosen (2013) (e‑short)
- And They Shall Know No Fear (2013)
- Dishonoured (November 2016)
- Circle of Honour (November 2014) (Anthology)
- The Black Pilgrim (2013)
- Helbrecht: The Crusader Advent Calendar (2013)
- Eternal Crusader (2013)
- Blood and Fire (2013) (Armageddon Anthology)
- Helsreach (April 2010)
- Only Blood (2014) (Anthology)
- Season of Shadows (2014)
- Vengeful Honour (December 2014) (e‑short)
- Champions All (2019) (e‑short)
- Helbrecht: Knight of the Throne (July 2022)
- Throne of Light (April 2022)
- The Iron Kingdom (February 2023)
- The Martyr’s Tomb (July 2023)
- Broken Crusade (November 2024)
- Helbrecht: Sin of Hope by Mike Vincent (novel) (September 2026)

== Blood Angels ==
=== Novel series ===
Authored by James Swallow

- Deus Encarmine (December 2004)
- Deus Sanguinius (April 2005)
- Red Fury (September 2008)
- Black Tide (February 2010)

=== Other stories ===
- Heart of Rage (novella) (July 2009)
- Bloodline (novella) (September 2010)
- Bloodquest : Prisoners of the Eye of Terror (audio drama) (December 2012)
- Bloodspire (audio drama) (January 2013)
- Dante by Guy Haley (novel) (March 2017)
- Blood Angels: The Complete Rafen Omnibus by James Swallow (This omnibus contains The Fury, Deus Encarmine, Blood Debt, Deus Sanguinius, Redeemed, Red Fury, Black Tide, Bloodline, and Reflection in Blood.)
- Darkness in the Blood by Guy Haley (novel) (2019)
- Astorath: Angel of Mercy by Guy Haley (novel) (2022)
- Wrath of the Lost by Chris Forrester (a "Flesh Tearers" novel) (2023)

=== Mephiston trilogy ===
Authored by Darius Hinks

- Blood of Sanguinius (novel 1) (September 2017)
- The Revenant Crusade (novel 2) (July 2018)
- City of Light (novel 3) (December 2019)

== Carcharodons ==
- The Reaping Time by Robbie MacNiven (short story) (December 2016)
- Red Tithe by Robbie MacNiven (novel 1) (January 2017)
- Death Warrant by Robbie MacNiven (short story) (August 2017)
- Outer Dark by Robbie MacNiven (novel 2) (March 2018)
- Silent Hunters by Edoardo Albert (novel) (March 2021)
- Void Exile by Robbie MacNiven (novel 3) (June 2025)

== Chaos Space Marines ==
=== Abaddon the Despoiler ===
- Extinction by Aaron Dembski-Bowden (novel 0) (August 2013)... Collected in Gamesday Anthology 2012/13
- The Talon of Horus by Aaron Dembski-Bowden (novel 1) (November 2014)
- Black Legion by Aaron Dembski-Bowden (novel 2) (August 2017)

=== Fabius Bile ===
- Primogenitor by Josh Reynolds (novel 1) (December 2016)
- Clonelord by Josh Reynolds (novel 2) (December 2017)
- Manflayer by Josh Reynolds (novel 3) (April 2020)

=== Huron Blackheart ===
- Huron Blackheart: Master of the Maelstrom by Mike Brooks (novel) (2022)
- Blackheart: Claws of the Maelstrom by Marc Collins (novel) (2026)

== Ciaphas Cain ==
Authored by Alex Stewart under the pseudonym Sandy Mitchell

=== Novel series ===
- For the Emperor (November 2003)
- Caves of Ice (January 2004)
- The Traitor's Hand (May 2005)
- Death or Glory (February 2006)
- Duty Calls (May 2007)
- Cain's Last Stand (November 2008)
- The Emperor's Finest (December 2010)
- The Last Ditch (February 2012)
- The Greater Good (January 2013)
- Choose Your Enemies (September 2018)
- Vainglorious (August 2023)

=== Other stories ===
- Short Story 1: Fight or Flight (2002)
- Short Story 2: The Beguiling (2003)
- Short Story 3: Echoes of the Tomb (2004)
- Short Story 4: Sector Thirteen (2005)
- Short Story 5: Traitor's Gambit (2009)
- Audio Book 1: Dead in the Water (2011)
- Short Story 6: A Mug of Recaff (2012)
- Novella: Old Soldiers Never Die (2012)
- Short Story 7: The Smallest Detail (2012)
- Short Story 8: The Little Things (2012)
- Audio Book 2: The Devil You Know (2014)

== Commisar Yarrick ==
Authored by David Annandale

- Chains of Golgotha (novella) (January 2013)
- Imperial Creed (novel 1) (June 2015)
- The Pyres of Armageddon (novel 2) (May 2016)
- Yarrick: The Omnibus (Imperial Creed, The Pyres of Armageddon, Chains of Golgotha, A Plague of Saints, The Wreckage, Evil Eye, The Gallows Saint, Sacrificial, Sarcophagus) (2023)

== Crimson Fists ==
- Legacy of Dorn by Mike Lee (novel) (April 2018)

== Dark Angels ==
=== Legacy of Caliban trilogy ===
- Ravenwing by Gav Thorpe (January 2013)
- Master of Sanctity by Gav Thorpe (June 2014)
- The Unforgiven by Gav Thorpe (May 2015)

=== Other stories ===
- Eye of Terror by Barrington J. Bayley (novel) (November 1999)
- Angels of Darkness by Gav Thorpe (novel) (February 2003)
- The Purging of Kadillus by Gav Thorpe (a "Space Marines Battles" novel) (February 2011)
- Dark Vengeance by C.Z. Dunn (novella) (September 2012)
- The Book of the Lion by various (anthology) (January 2013)
- Lords of Caliban by Gav Thorpe (anthology) (June 2015)
- Azrael by Gav Thorpe (a "Space Marines Legends" novel) (May 2017)
- Knights of Caliban - A Warhammer 40,000 Omnibus (this omnibus contains the novels The Purging of Kadillus, Angels of Darkness, and Azrael.) (May 2019)
- The Lion: Son of the Forest by Mike Brooks (novel) (April 2023)
- Cypher: Lord of the Fallen by John French (novel) (July 2023)
- Lazarus: Enmity's Edge by Gary Kloster (novel) (April 2024)

== Dark Heresy ==
Authored by Sandy Mitchell

- Scourge The Heretic (February 2008)
- Innocence Proves Nothing (November 2009)

== Dawn of Fire ==
- Avenging Son by Guy Haley (novel 1) (August 2020)
- The Gate of Bones by Andy Clark (novel 2) (February 2021)
- The Wolftime by Gav Thorpe (novel 3) (November 2021)
- Throne Of Light by Guy Haley (novel 4) (April 2022)
- The Iron Kingdom by Nick Kyme (novel 5) (February 2023)
- The Martyr's Tomb by Marc Collins (novel 6) (July 2023)
- Sea of Souls by Chris Wraight (novel 7) (January 2024)
- Hand of Abaddon by Nick Kyme (novel 8) (September 2024)
- The Silent King by Guy Haley (novel 9) (July 2025)

== Dawn of War ==
=== Novel trilogy ===
Authored by Cassern S. Goto

- Dawn of War (November 2004)
- Ascension (November 2005)
- Tempest (September 2006)

=== Other stories ===
- Dawn of War 2 by Chris Roberson (novel) (February 2009)
- Dawn of War 3 by Robbie MacNiven (novel) (April 2017)

== Death Guard ==
- The Lords of Silence by Chris Wraight (novel) (August 2018)
- Realm of Silence by Chris Wraight (novel) (December 2026)

== Deathwatch ==
=== Novel duology ===
Authored by Cassern S. Goto

- Warrior Brood (September 2005)
- Warrior Coven (May 2006)

=== Other stories ===
- Xenos Hunters by various (anthology) (September 2012)
- Deathwatch: Ignition by various (anthology) (March 2016)
- Deathwatch: The Last Guardian by C.Z. Dunn (audio drama) (August 2016)

=== Novel Series ===
- Deathwatch by Steve Parker (novel 1) (May 2013)
- Shadowbreaker by Steve Parker (novel 2) (April 2019)

== Drukhari ==
Authored by Andy Chambers

=== Novel trilogy ===
- Path of the Renegade (February 2012)
- Path of the Incubus (February 2013)
- Path of the Archon (2014)

=== Other stories ===
- The Masque of Vyle (novella) (February 2013)
- Lelith Hesperax: Queen of Knives (2024)

== Emperor's Children ==
- Renegades: Lord of Excess by Rich McCormick (novel) (January 2025)
- Fulgrim – The Perfect Son by Jude Reid (novel) (2025)

=== Lucius the Eternal ===
- The Faultless Blade by Ian St. Martin (novel 1) (August 2017)
- The Embrace of Pain by Ian St. Martina (audio drama)

== Exorcists ==
- Oaths of Damnation by Robbie MacNiven (novel) (2024)

== Gathering Storm ==
=== Novel series ===
- Dark Imperium by Guy Haley (novel 1) (June 2017)
- Plague War by Guy Haley (novel 2) (October 2018)
- Godblight by Guy Haley (novel 3) (May 2021)

=== Other stories ===
- Cadia Stands by Justin D. Hill (novel) (September 2017)
- The Lords Of Silence by Chris Wraight (novel) (August 2018)
- Spear of the Emperor by Aaron Dembski-Bowden (novel) (June 2019)
- Lords and Tyrants by "various" (anthology) (April 2019)
- Cadian Honour by Justin D. Hill (novel 1) (April 2019)

== Gaunt's Ghosts ==
Authored by Dan Abnett

=== Novel series ===
- First and Only (August 1999)
- Ghostmaker (May 2000)
- Necropolis (November 2000)
- Honour Guard (August 2001)
- The Guns of Tanith (April 2002)
- Straight Silver (November 2002)
- Sabbat Martyr (August 2003)
- Traitor General (September 2004)
- His Last Command (October 2005)
- The Armour of Contempt (November 2006)
- Only in Death (November 2007)
- Blood Pact (November 2009)
- Salvation's Reach (October 2011)
- The Warmaster (December 2017)
- The Anarch (January 2019)
- Ghost Dossier 1: The Vincula Insurgency (June 2022)

=== Other stories ===
- Sabbat Worlds (anthology) (2010)
- Sabbat Crusade (anthology) (2014)
- Sabbat War (anthology) (2021)
- Double Eagle (novel) (2004)
- Interceptor City (novel) (2024)

== Genestealer Cults ==
- Cult of the Warmason by C.L. Werner (novel 1) (March 2017)
- Cult of the Spiral Dawn by Peter Fehervari (novel 2) (March 2018)
- Day of Ascension by Adrian Tchaikovsky (February 2022)

== Gothic War ==
Authored by Gordon Rennie

- Execution Hour (June 2001)
- Shadowpoint (March 2003)

== Grey Knights ==
=== Novel trilogy ===
Authored by Ben Counter

- Grey Knights (May 2004)
- Dark Adeptus (January 2006)
- Hammer of Daemons (February 2008)

=== Other stories ===
- The Emperor's Gift by Aaron Dembski-Bowden (May 2012)

=== Castellan Crowe series ===
- Warden of the Blade by David Annandale (novel 1) (November 2016)
- Castellan by David Annandale (novel 2) (July 2018)

== Imperial Knights ==
- Kingsblade by Andy Clark (novel 1) (February 2017)
- Knightsblade by Andy Clark (novel 2) (February 2018)
- Throne Questoris by Victoria Hayward (December 2026)

== Inquisitors ==
=== Eisenhorn ===
Authored by Dan Abnett

- Xenos (May 2001)
- Malleus (December 2001)
- Hereticus (January 2002)
- The Magos (February 2018)
- Master Imus's Transgression (audio drama)
- Regia Occulta (audio drama and short story)
- Thorn and Talon (audio drama) (includes the audio dramas Regia Occulta, Master Imus's Transgression, and Ravenor's Thorn Wishes Talon)

=== Ravenor ===
Authored by Dan Abnett

- Ravenor (March 2005)
- Ravenor Returned (June 2006)
- Ravenor Rogue (January 2008)
- "Playing Patience" (short story)
- Thorn Wishes Talon (audio drama)

=== Bequin ===
Authored by Dan Abnett

- Pariah: Ravenor vs. Eisenhorn (November 2012)
- Penitent (March 2021)

=== Czevak ===
Authored by Rob Sanders

- Necessary Evil (novella) (March 2011)
- Atlas Infernal (novel) (July 2011)

=== Astor Sabbathiel ===
Authored by George Mann

- Awakenings (July 2023)

== Inquisition ==
=== Vaults of Terra trilogy ===
- The Carrion Throne by Chris Wraight (novel 1) (May 2017)
- The Hollow Mountain by Chris Wraight (novel 2) (July 2019)
- The Dark City by Chris Wraight (novel 3) (July 2022)

=== The Horusian Wars trilogy ===
- Resurrection by John French (novel 1) (July 2017)
- Incarnation by John French (novel 2) (July 2018)
- Divination by John French (anthology) (October 2019)

=== Agent of the Throne audio drama series ===
- Blood & Lies by John French (August 2017)
- Truth & Dreams by John French (April 2018)
- Ashes & Oaths by John French (May 2019)

=== Watchers of the Throne trilogy ===
- The Emperor's Legion by Chris Wraight (novel 1) (September 2017)
- The Regent's Shadow by Chris Wraight (novel 2) (February 2020)

=== Other stories ===
- Rites of Passage by Mike Brooks (novel) (August 2019)
- Daemonhammer by Darius Hinks (an "Imperial Agents" novel) (2024)

== Inquisition War ==
Authored by Ian Watson

- Inquisitor (1990) (reprinted as Draco in 2002)
- Harlequin (1994)
- Chaos Child (1995)

== Iron Hands ==
- Iron Hands by Jonathan Green (novel) (2004)
- Medusan Wings by Matt Westbrook (novella) (July 2016)
- The Eye of Medusa by David Guymer (novel 1) (April 2017)
- The Voice of Mars by David Guymer (novel 2) (April 2018)

== Iron Warriors ==
Authored by Graham McNeill – these works are closely linked to the Ultramarines Series

- Storm of Iron (novel) (May 2002)
- Iron Warrior (novella) (April 2010)
- Iron Warriors The Omnibus (This omnibus contains the novel Storm of Iron, the novella Iron Warrior along with the short stories "The Enemy of My Enemy", "The Heraclitus Effect", "The Skull Harvest", "The Iron Without", and "The Beast of Calth") (2012)

== Last Chancers ==
Authored by Gav Thorpe

- Thirteenth Legion (December 2000)
- Kill Team (October 2001)
- Annihilation Squad (March 2004)
- Armageddon Saint (December 2019)

== Leagues of Votann ==
- The High Kâhl's Oath by Gav Thorpe (novel) (2024)

== Legends of the Dark Millennium ==
- Farsight by Phil Kelly (novel) (October 2015)
- Deathwatch by Ian St. Martin (novel) (August 2016)
- Genestealer Cults by Peter Fehervari (novel) (September 2016)
- Ultramarines by various (anthology 1) (August 2016 - paperback)
- Shas'o by various (anthology 2) (September 2016 - paperback)
- Sons of Corax by George Mann (anthology 3) (November 2016 - paperback)
- Astra Militarum by various (anthology 4) (December 2016 - paperback)
- Space Wolves by various (anthology 5) (February 2017 - paperback)

== Macharian Crusade ==
- Angel of Fire by William King (July 2012)
- Fist of Demetrius by William King (May 2013)
- Fall of Macharius by William King (July 2014)

== Necromunda ==
=== Novel series ===
- Survival Instinct by Andy Chambers (May 2005)
- Salvation by Cassern S. Goto (May 2005)
- Blood Royal by Gordon Rennie and Will McDermott (July 2005)
- Junktion by Matthew Farrer (October 2005)
- Fleshworks by Lucien Soulban (February 2006)
- Cardinal Crimson by Will McDermott (May 2006)
- Back from the Dead by Nick Kyme (August 2006)
- Outlander by Matt Keefe (December 2006)
- Lasgun Wedding by Will McDermott (April 2007)
- Terminal Overkill by Justin D. Hill (March 2019)
- Kal Jerico: Sinner's Bounty by Josh Reynolds (February 2020)
- Road to Redemption by Mike Brooks (March 2020)
- Soulless Fury by Will McDermott (July 2020)
- Fire Made Flesh by Denny Flowers (March 2021)

=== Other stories ===
- Underhive by "various" (anthology) (July 2019)
- "Status:Deadzone" by "various" (anthology) (November 2000)

== Necrons ==
=== The Twice-Dead King ===
Authored by Nate Crowley

- Ruin (October 2021)
- Reign (January 2022)

=== Other stories ===
- Severed by Nate Crowley (2019)
- The Infinite and the Divine by Robert Rath (October 2020)
- Tomb World by Jonathan D. Beer (novel) (2025)
- The Wicked and the Warped by Robert Rath (2026)

== Night Lords ==
Authored by Aaron Dembski-Bowden

=== Novel series ===
- Soul Hunter (March 2010)
- Blood Reaver (May 2011)
- Void Stalker (May 2012)

=== Other stories ===
- Throne of Lies (audio drama) (August 2010)
- Lord of the Night by Simon Spurrier (novel) (2005)
- The Remnant Blade by Mike Vincent (novel) (2025)

== Officio Assassinorum ==
- Assassinorum Kingmaker Robert Rath (novel) (2022)

== Orks ==
- Sanctus Reach: Evil Sun Rising by Guy Haley (novella) (July 2014)
- Claw of Mork Guy Haley (audio drama) (July 2014)
- Prophets of Waaagh! by Guy Haley (audio drama) (October 2018)
- Brutal Kunnin by Mike Brooks (novel) (September 2020)
- Da Gobbo's Revenge by Mike Brooks (novella) (November 2021)
- Ghazghkull Thraka: Prophet of the Waaagh! by Nate Crowley (March 2022)
- Warboss by Mike Brooks (novel) (August 2022)
- Da Gobbo's Demise by Denny Flowers (novella) (November 2022)
- Da Gobbo Rides Again by Rhuairidh James (novella) (November 2023)
- Da Big Dakka by Mike Brooks (novel) (February 2024)
- Da Red Gobbo Collection (anthology) (November 2024)
- Long Live Da Red Gobbo by Justin Woolley (novel) (2024)
- Grotsnik: Da Mad Dok by Denny Flowers (novel) (May 2025)
- Da Red Gobbo's Last Stand by Andi Ewington (novella) (2025)
- Ghazghkull Thraka: Warlord of Warlords by Denny Flowers (novel) (2026)
- Da Freebooterz Code by Justin Woolley (novel) (2026)
- Da Red Gobbo’s Reckoning by Callum Davis (novella) (November 2026)

== Raptors ==
- Raptors: War and Shadow by William Crowe’ (novel) (November 2026)

== Raven Guard ==
Authored by George Mann

- Hellion Rain (audio drama) (February 2011)
- Labyrinth of Sorrows (audio drama) (February 2012)
- The Unkindness of Ravens (novella) (May 2012)
- With Baited Breath (audio drama) (November 2012)
- The Geld (audio drama) (November 2017)
- Soulbound (audio drama) (August 2018)

== Rise of the Ynnari ==
- Ghost Warrior by Gav Thorpe (novel 1) (October 2017)
- Wild Rider by Gav Thorpe (novel 2) (November 2018)

== Rogue Trader ==
=== Novel trilogy ===
Authored by Andy Hoare

- Rogue Star (August 2006)
- Star of Damocles (August 2007)
- Savage Scars (March 2011)

=== Blackstone Fortress ===
- Blackstone Fortress by Darius Hink (novel 1) (May 2020)
- Ascension by Darius Hink (novel 2) (September 2020)
- The Beast Inside by Darius Hink (audio drama) (September 2019)
- Vaults of Obsidian by "various" (anthology) (May 2020)
- Augur of Despair by Chris Dows (audio drama) (September 2020)

=== Other stories ===
- Corsair: The Face of the Void by James Swallow (audio drama) (January 2018)
- Void King by Marc Collins (July 2023)

== Salamanders ==
Authored by Nick Kyme

=== Tome of Fire trilogy ===
- Salamander (September 2009)
- Firedrake (November 2010)
- Nocturne (November 2011)
- Tome of Fire (anthology) (December 2012)
- Lords of Nocturne (Omnibus) (September 2024)

=== Circle of Fire trilogy ===
- Rebirth (November 2016)

== Shira Calpurnia ==
Authored by Matthew Farrer

- Crossfire (June 2003)
- Legacy (July 2004)
- Blind (July 2006)
- Enforcer The Shira Calpurnia Omnibus (This omnibus includes Crossfire, Legacy, Blind, and bonus dossiers on each book plus a new introduction by the author) (2010)

== Silver Skulls ==
- Silver Skulls: Portents by S.P. Cawkwell (November 2015)

== Soul Drinkers ==
Authored by Ben Counter

=== Novel series ===
- Soul Drinker (September 2002)
- The Bleeding Chalice (December 2003)
- Crimson Tears (February 2005)
- Chapter War (April 2007)
- Hellforged (April 2009)
- Phalanx (April 2012)

=== Other stories ===
- Daenyathos (novella) (August 2010)

== Space Marine Battles ==
=== Novels and Anthologies ===
- 001: Rynn's World by Steve Parker (February 2010)
- 002: Helsreach by Aaron Dembski-Bowden (May 2010)
- 003: The Hunt For Voldorius by Andy Hoare (September 2010)
- 004: The Purging of Kadillus by Gav Thorpe (February 2011)
- 005: The Fall of Damnos by Nick Kyme (April 2011)
- 006: Battle of the Fang by Chris Waight (June 2011)
- 007: The Gildar Rift by Sarah Cawkwell (December 2011)
- 008: Catechism of Hate (Novella) Gav Thorpe (January 2012)
- 009: Legion of the Damned by Rob Sanders (April 2012)
- 010: Architect of Fate by "various" (this anthology includes the novellas "Accursed Eternity, Endeavour of Will, Fateweaver and Sanctus") (May 2012)
- 011: Wrath of Iron by Chris Wraight (June 2012)
- 012: The Siege of Castellax by C.L. Werner (December 2012)
- 013: The Death of Antagonis by David Annandale (February 2013)
- 014: The Death of Integrity by Guy Haley (September 2013)
- 015: Malodrax by Ben Counter (January 2014)
- 016: Overfiend by David Annandale (this anthology includes the novellas "Stormseer, Shadow Captain and Forge Master") (June 2014)
- 017: Pandorax by C.Z. Dunn (November 2014)
- 018: Damocles by "various" (this anthology includes the novellas "Blood Oath, Broken Sword, Black Leviathan and Hunter's Snare") (March 2015)
- 019: The World Engine by Ben Counter (April 2015)
- 020: Sanctus Reach by "various" (this anthology includes the novellas "Evil Sun Rising and Blood on the Mountain" and short stories) (December 2015)
- 021: Flesh Tearers by Andy Smillie (the anthology includes the novellas "Flesh of Cretacia, Sons of Wrath and Trial by Blood") (February 2016)
- 022: Blades of Damocles by Phil Kelly (April 2016)
- 023: The Plagues of Orath by "various" (this anthology includes the novellas "Plague Harvest, Engines of War and Armour of Faith") (July 2016)
- 024: Crusaders of Dorn by Guy Haley (this anthology includes short stories) (August 2016)
- 025: Calgar's Siege by Paul Kearney (September 2016)
- 026: Storm of Damocles by Justin D. Hill (September 2016)
- 027: Tyrant of the Hollow Worlds by Mark Clapham (December 2016)
- 028: Shield of Baal by "various" (this anthology includes the novellas "Deathstorm, Tempestus and Devourer") (January 2017)
- 029: Scythes of the Emperor by L.J. Goulding (includes the novel "Slaughter at Giant's Coffin" and five short stories) (February 2017)
- 030: The Eye of Ezekiel by C.Z. Dunn (March 2017)

=== Space Marine Legends series ===
- Lemartes by David Annandale (2015)
- Ragnar Blackmane by Aaron Dembski-Bowden (December 2016)
- Cassius by Ben Counter (February 2017)
- Shrike by George Mann (March 2017)
- Azrael by Gav Thorpe (May 2017)

=== Lords of the Space Marines series ===
- Mephiston: Lord of Death by David Annandale (novella) (January 2013)
- Arjac Rockfist: Anvil of Fenris by Ben Counter (novella) (March 2014)
- Lemartes: Guardian of the Lost by David Annandale (novel) (March 2016)

=== Omnibus ===
- Armageddon by Aaron Dembski-Bowden (this omnibus includes the novel Helsreach and the novella Blood and Fire) (July 2013)
- Damnos by Nick Kyme (this omnibus includes the novel Fall of Damnos and the novella Spear of Macragge) (September 2013)
- The War for Rynn's World by Steve Parker and Mike Lee (this omnibus includes the novel Rynn's World, the novella Traitor's Gorge, and short stories) (August 2014)
- War of the Fang by Chris Wraight (this omnibus includes the novel Battle of the Fang and the novella Hunt for Magnus) (January 2015)
- Defenders of Mankind by David Annandale and Guy Haley (this omnibus includes the novels The Death of Antagonis and Death of Integrity along with the short stories "The Tribute of Flesh", "The Rite of Holos", "Blood Calm", and "Final Journey". It features the space marine chapters of the Black Dragons, Blood Drinkers, and Novamarines) (2015)

== Space Marine Conquests ==
=== Novels ===
- 001: The Devastation of Baal by Guy Haley (November 2017)
- 002: Ashes of Prospero by Gav Thorpe (March 2018)
- 003: War of Secrets by Phil Kelly (June 2018)
- 004: Of Honour and Iron by Ian St. Martin (September 2018)
- 005: Apocalypse by Josh Reynolds (July 2019)
- 006: Fist of the Imperium by Andy Clark (February 2020)
- For Glory and Honour (this omnibus includes the novels Of Honour and Iron, Apocalypse and Fist of the Imperium) (2023)

=== Space Marines Heroes series ===
- Blood Rite by Rachel Harrison (novella) (September 2019)

=== Other stories ===
- On Wings of Blood by "various" (anthology) (September 2019)

== Space Wolves ==
=== Ragnar series ===
- Space Wolf by William King (December 1999)
- Ragnar's Claw by William King (July 2000)
- Grey Hunter by William King (February 2002)
- Wolfblade by William King (October 2003)
- Sons of Fenris by Lee Lightner (January 2007)
- Wolf's Honour by Lee Lightner (March 2008)
- The Space Wolf Omnibus by William King (this omnibus includes the novels Space Wolf, Ragnar's Claw, and Grey Hunter) (2017)

=== Sagas of the Space Wolves series ===
- Sons of Russ (e-book anthology of previously published short stories) (July 2012)

=== Blood of Asaheim series ===
- Blood of Asaheim by Chris Wraight (April 2013)
- Stormcaller by Chris Wraight (September 2014)
- The Helwinter Gate by Chris Wraight (December 2020)

=== War Zone: Fenris series ===
- Curse of the Wulfen by David Annandale (novel) (2016)
- Legacy of Russ I: The Lost King by Robbie MacNiven (short story) (2016)
- Legacy of Russ II: The Young Wolf's Return by Robbie MacNiven (short story) (2016)
- Legacy of Russ III: Lying in Flames by Robbie MacNiven (short story) (2016)
- Legacy of Russ IV: The Broken Crown by Robbie MacNiven (short story) (2016)
- Legacy of Russ V: Infurnace by Robbie MacNiven (short story) (2016)
- Legacy of Russ VI: Wolf Trap by Robbie MacNiven (short story) (2016)
- Legacy of Russ VII: The Wild King by Robbie MacNiven (short story) (2016)
- Legacy of Russ VIII: Fate Unbound by Robbie MacNiven (short story) (2016)
- Vox Tenebris by Robbie MacNiven (audio drama) (October 2016)
- Legacy of the Wulfen by David Annandale & Robbie MacNiven (this anthology includes "Curse of the Wulfen" & "Legacy of Russ" (June 2017)

=== Other stories ===
- Deathwolf (audio drama) (January 2013)
- Hunter's Moon (audio drama) (November 2013)
- Wolves of Fenris (anthology) (April 2014)
- Lukas the Trickster by Josh Reynolds (novel) (February 2018)
- Krakenblood by Marc Collins (novel) (October 2025)
- Bjorn: The Fell-Handed by Justin D. Hill (novel) (August 2026)

== T'au Empire ==
- Fire Warrior by Simon Spurrier (September 2003)
- Shadowsun By Braden Campbell (novella) (March 2013)
- Farsight: Crisis of Faith by Phil Kelly (novel 1) (July 2017)
- Farsight: Empire of Lies by Phil Kelly (novel 2) (February 2020)
- Shadowsun: The Patient Hunter by Phil Kelly (novel) (November 2022)
- Elemental Council by Noah Van Nguyen (December 7, 2024)
- Farsight: Blade of Truth by Phil Kelly (novel 3) (April 2025)

=== Short stories ===
- "The Arkunasha War" by Andy Chambers
- "Aun'shi" by Braden Campbell
- "A Sanctuary of Wyrms" by Peter Fehervari

== Thousand Sons ==
=== Ahriman ===
- Exile by John French (novel 1) (June 2013)... Also collected in Ahriman: The Omnibus
- Sorcerer by John French (novel 2) (December 2014)... Also collected in Ahriman: The Omnibus
- Unchanged by John French (novel 3) (January 2016)... Also collected in Ahriman: The Omnibus
- Eternal by John French (novel 4) (July 2022)
- Undying by John French (novel 5) (May 2025)

== Ultramarines ==
Authored by Graham McNeill – these works are closely linked to the Iron Warriors Series

=== Novel series ===
- Nightbringer (January 2002)
- Warriors of Ultramar (March 2003)
- Dead Sky Black Sun (October 2004)
- The Killing Ground (June 2008)
- Courage and Honour (June 2009)
- The Chapter's Due (June 2010)
- The Swords of Calth (2021)

=== Other stories ===
- Eye of Vengeance by Graham McNeill (audio drama) (May 2012)
- Calgar's Fury by Paul Kearney (novel) (October 2017)
- Blood of Iax by Robbie MacNiven (novel) (September 2018)
- Knights Of Macragge by Nick Kyme (novel) (July 2019)
- Indomitus by Gav Thorpe (novel) (July 2020)
- Leviathan by Darius Hinks (novel) (January 2023)
- Master of Rites by Rob Young (novel) (2025)

== White Scars ==
- Savage Scars by Andy Hoare (novel) (March 2011)
- The Last Hunt by Robbie MacNiven (novel) (November 2017)

== Word Bearers ==
The original novel series is authored by Anthony Reynolds.

=== Novel series ===
- Dark Apostle (September 2007)
- Dark Disciple (December 2008)
- Dark Creed (January 2010)
- Word Bearers: The Omnibus (This omnibus contains the novels Dark Apostle, Dark Disciple, and Dark Creed along with the short story "Torment")
- Apostle by David Annandale (novel) (2025)

== World Eaters ==
=== Khârn the Betrayer ===
- Eater of Worlds by Anthony Reynolds (novel) (March 2015)
- The Red Path by Chris Dows (anthology) (September 2016)

== Warhammer Crime ==
- Bloodlines by Chris Wraight (August 2020)
- Flesh and Steel by Guy Haley (September 2020)
- Grim Repast by Marc Collins (September 2021)
- The Wraithbone Phoenix by Alec Worley (August 2022)
- King of the Spoil by Jonathan D. Beer (July 2023)

=== Anthologies ===
- Broken City (August 2021)
- No Good Men (August 2020)
- Sanction and Sin (September 2021)
- The Vorbis Conspiracy (September 2022)
- Once a Killer (October 2023)

=== Audio dramas ===
- Dredge Runners by Alec Worley (August 2020)

== Warhammer Horror ==
- The Watcher in the Rain by Alec Worley (Audio Drama) (November 2019)

== Warhammer 40k other releases ==
=== Anthologies ===
- Deathwing edited by David Pringle (1990)
- Into The Maelstrom edited by Marc Gascoigne and Andy Jones (September 1999)
- Dark Imperium edited by Marc Gascoigne and Andy Jones (January 2001)
- Deathwing edited by Neil Jones and David Pringle (November 2001) (re-release of deathwing (1990))
- Words of Blood edited by Marc Gascoigne and Christian Dunn (July 2002)
- Crucible of War edited by Marc Gascoigne and Christian Dunn (May 2003)
- What Price Victory edited by Marc Gascoigne and Christian Dunn (April 2004)
- Bringers of Death edited by Marc Gascoigne and Christian Dunn (August 2005)
- Let The Galaxy Burn edited by Marc Gascoigne and Christian Dunn (April 2006)
- Tales from the Dark Millennium edited by Marc Gascoigne and Christian Dunn (October 2006)
- Planetkill edited by Nick Kyme and Lindsey Priestley (July 2008)
- The Book of Blood edited by Christian Dunn (April 2010) contains
  - Space Hulk by Gav Thorpe
  - Crimson Night by James Swallow
  - The Blood of Angels by C.S. Goto
  - Heart of Rage by James Swallow
  - At Gaius Point by Aaron Dembski-Bowden
  - Blood Debt by James Swallow
- Fear The Alien edited by Christian Dunn (September 2010)
- The Space Marine Script Book edited by Christian Dunn (collects audio drama scripts) (December 2012)
- There Is Only War edited by Christian Dunn (January 2014)
- Galaxy of Horrors (2023)
- Blood of the Imperium (2024)
- Darkness Eternal (2025)
- No Peace Among Stars (2025)
- Carnage Unending (2026)
- World Ablaze (2026)
- Treachery Unbound (2026)

==== Space Marines anthology series ====
- Heroes of the Space Marines edited by Nick Kyme and Lindsey Priestley (May 2009)
- Legends of the Space Marines edited by Christian Dunn (May 2010)
- Victories of the Space Marines edited by Christian Dunn (April 2011)
- Treacheries of the Space Marines edited by Christian Dunn (October 2012)
- Honour of the Space Marines By "various" (2014)

=== Audio dramas ===
- Thunder from Fenris by Nick Kyme (December 2009)
- The Madness Within by Steve Lyons (August 2011)
- Mission: Purge by Gav Thorpe (September 2012)
- Perfection by Nick Kyme (October 2012)
- Chosen of Khorne by Anthony Reynolds (October 2012)
- Doomseeker by Nick Kyme (e-audio drama short) (November 2012)

=== Gamebooks ===
- Hive of the Dead by Christian Dunn (September 2011)
- Herald of Oblivion by Jonathan Green (July 2012)

=== Novels ===
- Space Marine by Ian Watson (1993)
- Pawns of Chaos by Brian Stableford (April 2001)
- Farseer by William King (May 2002)
- Daemon World by Ben Counter (April 2003)
- Relentless by Richard Williams (April 2008)
- Brothers of the Snake by Dan Abnett (May 2008)
- Assault on Black Reach by Nick Kyme (September 2008)
- Space Hulk: The Novel by Gav Thorpe (September 2009)
- Sons of Dorn by Chris Roberson (January 2010)
- Daenyathos by Ben Counter (novella) (August 2010)
- Accursed Eternity By Sarah Cawkwell (novella) (2012)
- Endeavour of Will by Ben Counter (novella) (2012)
- Fateweaver by John French (Novella) (2012)
- Sanctus by Darius Hinks (novella) (2012)
- The Unkindness of ravens by George Mann (novella) (2012)
- Old Soldiers Never Die by Sandy Mitchell (novella) (2012)
- Knights of the imperium By Graham McNeill (novella) (2014)
- Genefather by Guy Haley (October 2023)
- Angron: The Red Angel by David Guymer (novel) (2024)
- Vagabond Squadron by Robbie MacNiven (novel) (2025)
- HIVE by Dan Abnett (novel) (2026)
- Armageddon: Season of Fire by Jude Reid (novel) (2026)

==== E-shorts ====
- "For The Fallen" * by Aaron Dembski-Bowden (March 2012)
- "Kill Hill" * by Dan Abnett (March 2012)
- "The Weakness of Others" * by Laurie Goulding (March 2012)
- "All is Dust" by John French (April 2012)
- "Evil Eye" * by David Annandale (April 2012)
- "Eclipse of Hope" by David Annandale (July 2012)

==== Hammer and Bolter stories ====
Hammer and Bolter was a download-only Black Library monthly e-magazine published between October 2010 and November 2012. It included short stories, novel extracts, and serialized novellas in text and audio formats.

- "Hunted" by John French (Issue 4)
- "Action & Consequence" by Sarah Cawkwell (Issue 5)
- "Tower of Blood" by Tony Ballantyne (Issue 6)
- "Flesh" by Chris Wraight (Issue 7)
- "Cause and Effect" by Sarah Cawkwell (Issue 8)
- "A Commander Shadow" by Braden Campbell (Issue 8)
- "The Arkunasha War" by Andy Chambers (Issue 9)
- "We Are One" by John French (Issue 10)
- "Bitter End" by Sarah Cawkwell (Issue 12 - October 2011)
- "Aenarion" by Gav Thorpe (Issue 12 - October 2011)
- "The Inquisition" by Ben Counter (Issue 12 - October 2011)
- "Reparation" by Andy Smillie (Issue 13)
- "Lesser Evils" by Tom Foster (Issue 13)
- "Hunted" by Braden Campbell (Issue 13)
- "In the Shadow of the Emperor" by Chris Dows (Issue 14)
- "The Pact" by Sarah Cawkwell (Issue 15)
- "The Shadow in the Glass" by Steve Lyons (Issue 16)
- "Vermilion" by Ben Counter (Issue 17)
- "Irixa" by Ben Counter (Issue 19)
- "In Hrondir's Tomb" by Mark Clapham (Issue 20)
- "The Shadow of the Beast " by Laurie Goulding (Issue 21)
- "The Mouth of Chaos" by Chris Dows (Issue 22)
- "Tyrant's Chosen" by Sarah Cawkwell (Issue 23)
- "The Rite of Holos" by Guy Haley (Issue 24)

==== Inferno! stories ====
Inferno! was a bi-monthly print magazine published by the Black Library between July 1997 and January 2005.

- "Altar of Cyrene" by Lucien Soulban (Issue 45) (November–December 2004)

== See also ==
- Warhammer 40,000 comics
