= Ghoul King =

Ghoul King may refer to:

- Two e-short stories from the Warhammer Fantasy setting from 2014 by Josh Reynolds:
  - Ghoul King 1: Conqueror of Worms
  - Ghoul King 2: Empire of Maggots
- The Ghoul King, a 2016 novel by Guy Haley

== Fictional characters ==
- Doresain, a fictional demigod and demon lord in the Dungeons & Dragons game, wearing the title Ghoul King
- Ghoul king, an antagonist in the Scooby-Doo! Classic Creep Capers video game
