= Nathan Long =

Nathan Long is the name of:

- Nathan Long (author), American fantasy author
- Nathan Long (rugby league) (born 1973), Australian rugby league player
