= Klaus Scherwinski =

German science fiction and role playing game illustrator

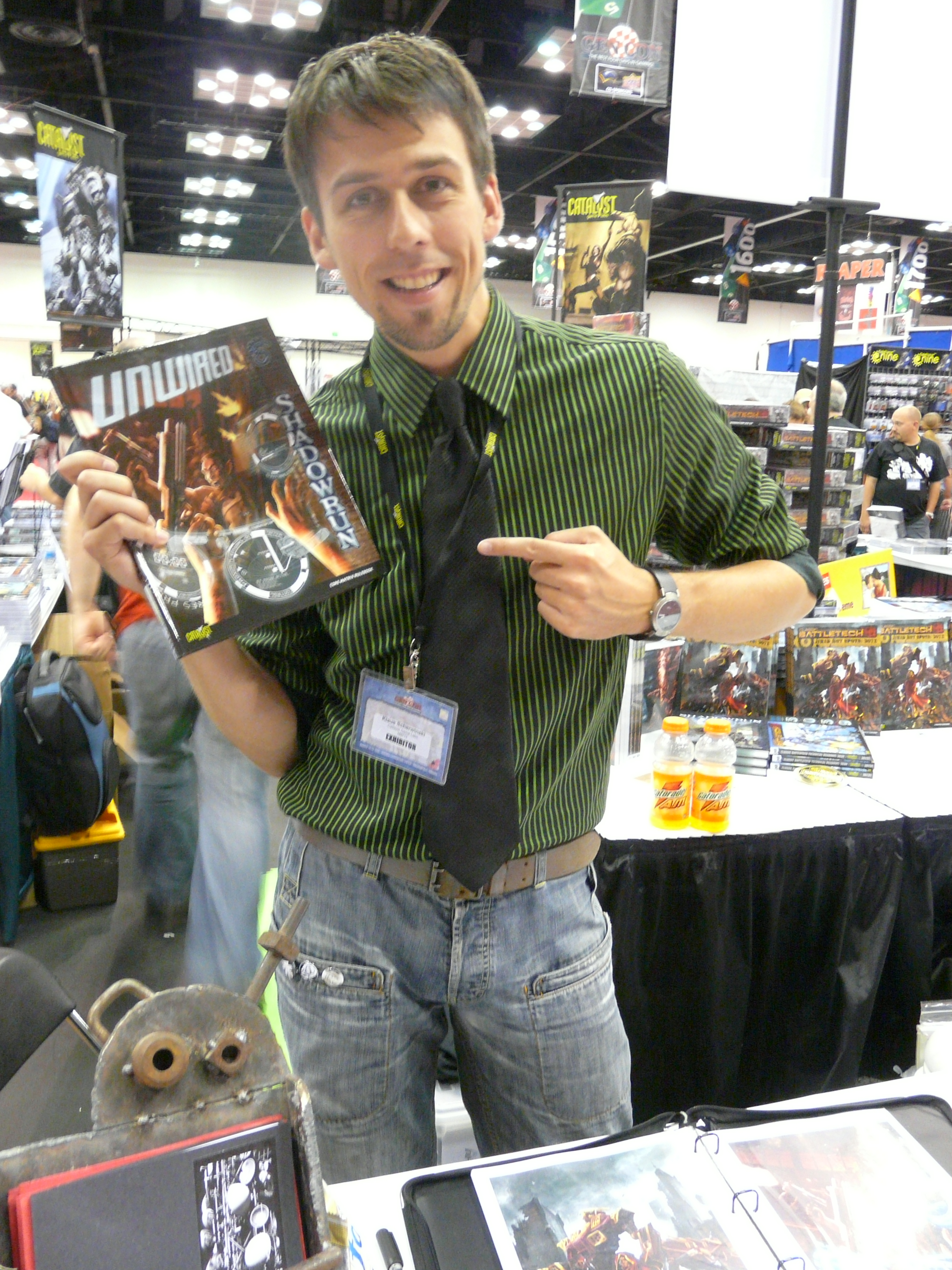
- Klaus Scherwinski at Gen Con in 2008
- Born: 1976 (age 49–50); Minden, Ostwestfalen-Lippe, Germany
- Known for: Fantasy art

Klaus Scherwinski (born 1976) is a German science fiction and role playing game illustrator.

== Career ==
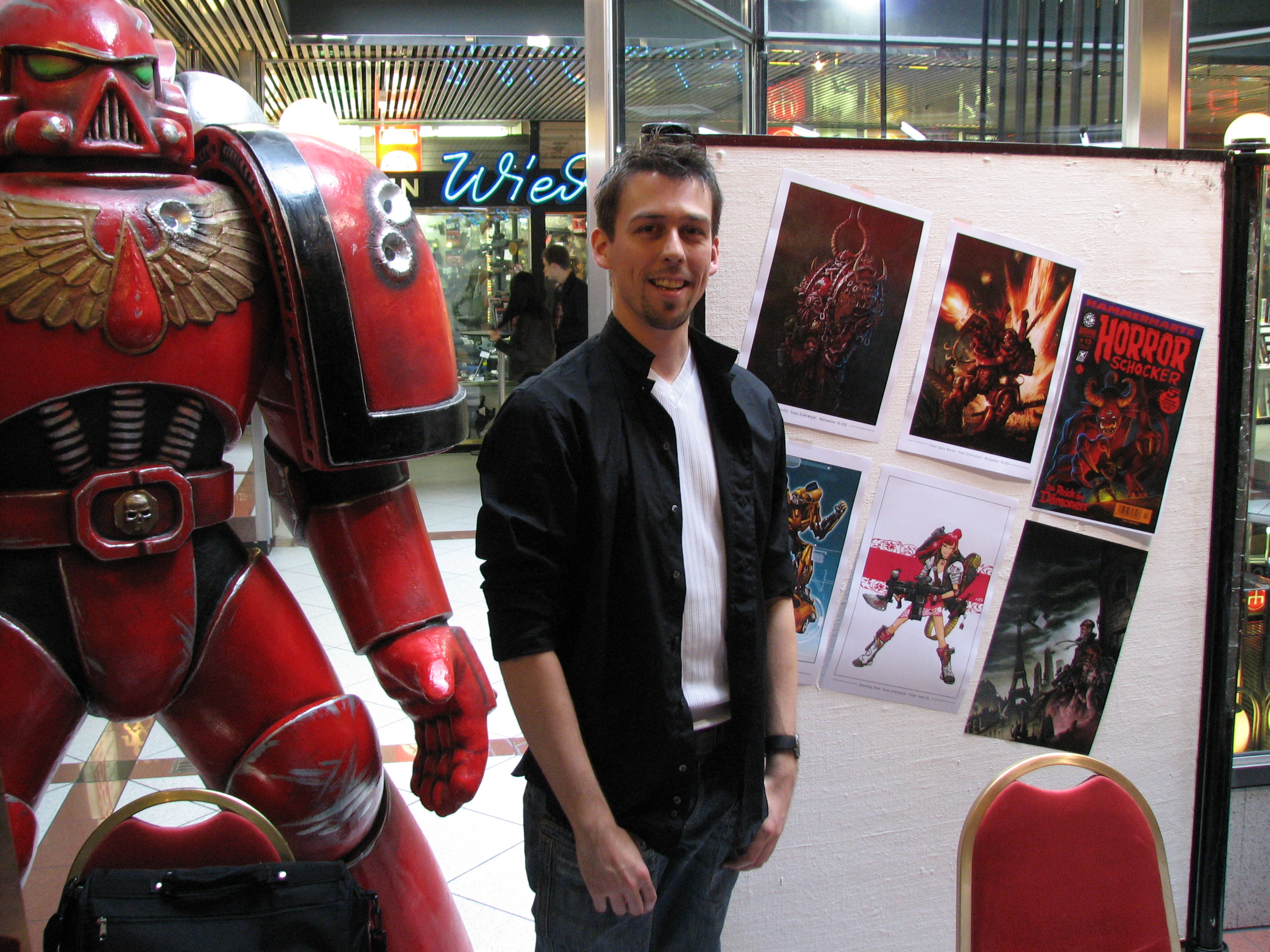
Klaus Scherwinski in Berlin.

Klaus Scherwinski's first major project was his Kopeck superhero comic series published in 1999. He provided the cover art for the Warhammer 40,000 novel Fifteen Hours (2005) by Mitchel Scanlon. Scherwinski drew several stories for writers Josef Rother and Boris Koch which were published in Horrorschocker.

Scherwinski's role-playing game work includes books for Shadowrun, GURPS, and MechWarrior. His comic book work for the U.S. market includes the G.I. Joe and Transformers series from IDW Publishing.
