= Nathan Long (author) =

American writer

- Occupations: Author and Screenwriter
- Writing career
- Genres: Screenplays and fantasy novels
- Website: Official website

Nathan Long is an American fantasy author. He is well known for his Gotrek and Felix novels, along with The Blackhearts Trilogy and Jane Carver of Waar.

== Early history ==
Long has been writing since the age of twelve. Once he broke into the industry, he wrote screenplays for fifteen years. His work resulted in three films and many animated and live-action TV episodes. He lives in Los Angeles, where he writes as well as playing regularly with his band, MI-6.

== Warhammer Novels ==
=== The Blackhearts ===
Long is responsible for a set of infamous characters in the Warhammer Fantasy universe, the Blackhearts. A gang of renegades and rebels thrown together by unfortunate circumstances, they are given the choice of being hanged for their crimes, or completing secret missions, both highly classified and suicidally dangerous. There have been three novels, published in an omnibus, along with two short stories, one serving as a prologue.

=== Gotrek and Felix ===
When William King stepped back from authoring the series to pursue other projects, the ongoing narrative of Gotrek's quest to seek out his doom was, as yet, unfinished. Black Library then approached Long, at the time a newly established, popular author in the Warhammer Fantasy universe, and asked him to continue the series. Since the release of Orcslayer, Long has written four additional novels, along with an audio-book, making it one of the longest-running Black Library runs in the imprint's history, along with Dan Abnett's Gaunt's Ghosts series.

Long has been both hailed and criticised for his writing style, which differs substantially from that of King's, who was known for very flowery descriptive text. Long, however, writes with pace and emphasis on the brutal side of the two traveller's lifestyle. Long has also been quoted in an interview as stating that he has "... a rough idea ..." of how Gotrek's eventual death will occur. Audiences may assume this will emerge sooner rather than later, due to the naming format of the books (each a combination of a race or role, and the word "slayer"), and the limited number of races and roles left to cover.

Long was also one of the first few authors to publish an audio-book for the Black Library imprint, titled Slayer of the Storm God. Along with several short stories (mostly exclusive to events held by Games Workshop), these have helped fill out the universe immediately around Gotrek and Felix.

His last book in the series, Zombieslayer, was released in September 2010.

=== Ulrika the Vampire ===
In addition to his work on Gotrek and Felix, Long also wrote Bloodborn, the first novel in a series surrounding Ulrika, a love interest of Felix Jaeger in the Gotrek and Felix novels, who has become a vampire and is learning to cope with her new form and its wants and needs. Bloodborn was released in June 2010, and was followed by a sequel, Bloodforged, and finally Bloodsworn, the final novel in the trilogy, which was released in 2012. Bloodborn won the Scribe Award for Best Original Speculative novel in 2011.

== Other work ==
Long has also contributed to Black Library's range of novellas, with a short novel titled Battle for Skull Pass, released in 2008 and available exclusively to Games Workshop customers. The novella was based around the Dwarfs, and their battle to save the township of Karak Grom from greenskin invaders. It was written to accompany the Battle for Skull Pass box set, released by Games Workshop.

In March 2012, Night Shade Books published Long's first original book, Jane Carver of Waar. The official blurb from Night Shade Books calls it "... a loving tribute and scathing parody of the swashbuckling space fantasies of yore ...," while Publishers Weekly describes it as an "... affectionate and often raunchy parody of Edgar Rice Burroughs’s John Carter of Mars books ...," with a biker heroine in the John Carter role.

Nathan Long is lead writer for Wasteland 2, Wasteland 3, and a co-writer for Torment: Tides of Numenera, all of which were developed by InXile Entertainment. He was the lead writer and casting/voice over director for The Bard's Tale IV: Barrows Deep and also composed 4 of the songs in the game.

== Bibliography ==
- Valnir's Bane (2004) - ISBN 978-1-84416-166-9
- The Broken Lance (2005) - ISBN 978-1-84416-243-7
- Tainted Blood (2006) - ISBN 978-1-84416-371-7
- Orcslayer (2006) - ISBN 978-1-84416-391-5
- Manslayer (2007) - ISBN 978-1-84416-509-4
- Battle for Skull Pass (2008) - ISBN 978-1-84416-768-5
- Elfslayer (2008) - ISBN 978-1-84416-663-3
- Slayer of the Storm God (Audio Book) (2009) - ISBN 978-1-84416-756-2
- Shamanslayer (2009) - ISBN 978-1-84416-772-2
- Gotrek and Felix: The Third Omnibus (2009) - ISBN 978-1-84416-732-6
- Bloodborn: Ulrika the Vampire Book One (2010) - ISBN 978-1-84416-824-8
- Zombieslayer (2010) - ISBN 978-1-84416-880-4
- Bloodforged (2011) - ISBN 978-1-84970-013-9
- Jane Carver of Waar (2012) - ISBN 978-1-59780-396-0
- Bloodsworn (2012) - ISBN 978-1-84970-172-3
- Swords of Waar [Jane Carver; 2] (2012) - ISBN 978-1-59780-429-5

== Filmography ==
- Gehenna: Where Death Lives (2016) - Screenplay (co-written with Hiroshi Katagiri and Brad Palmer)
- Guyver: Dark Hero (1994) - Screenplay (also appeared as Cop #1)
- The Sender (1998) - Writer

== Television Credits ==
- Kamen Rider: Dragon Knight (2009–2010, head writer)
  - ”Search for the Dragon” (ep.1)
  - ”The Power of Two” (ep.5)
  - ”Kamen Rider Thrust” (ep.9)
  - ”The Hero of Gramercy Heights” (ep.16)
  - ”Letter from the Front Line” (ep.20)
  - ”A Rider’s Resolve” (ep.22)
  - ”Kamen Rider Siren” (ep.23)
  - ”Dark Temptation” (ep.24)
  - ”Swan Song” (ep.30)
  - ”Xaviax’s Wrath” (ep.31)
  - ”Advent Master Returns” (ep.32)
  - ”Dark Deception” (ep.36)
  - ”The Enemy Within” (ep.37)
  - ”For Ventara and Earth, Part 1” (ep.38)
  - ”For Ventara and Earth, Part 2” (ep.39)
  - ”A Dragon’s Tale” (ep.40)
- L.A. Heat (1999)
  - ”Words Will Never Hurt Me” (ep.9)
  - ”Killing on Lily Lane” (ep.19, co-written with Nick Stone)
  - ”When Irish Eyes Are Smiling” (ep.21, co-written with William Applegate Jr., Shari Lane Bowles, and William Lawlor)
  - ”Captain Crimestopper” (ep.23, co-written with Mark Sikes)
  - ”Wake Up Call” (ep.26)
  - ”The Bigger They Are” (ep.37)
  - ”Bad Reputation” (ep.42)
- Ultimate Book of Spells (2002)
  - ”Big Girls Don’t Cry” (ep.22)
