= Liber Necris =

Warhammer Fantasy sourcebook

Liber Necris is a sourcebook of background material relating to the different kinds of undead creature and concepts of necromancy that appear in the fictional Warhammer Fantasy setting. Written by Polish author Marijan Von Staufer, it was first published by The Black Library, an imprint of Games Workshop's publishing division BL Publishing, in June 2006.

== Fictional book ==
Liber Necris can also be considered a fiction book. It is written in an entirely in-game style, purportedly by Mannfred von Carstein, one of the vampire counts of the Warhammer Fantasy setting.

== Reviews ==
- Rue Morgue #66
