= Gavin Thorpe =

British game designer and author

- Occupations: Game designer, author
- Website: https://gavthorpe.co.uk

Gavin Thorpe is a game designer who has worked primarily on board games. He has also authored a number of novels and short stories for the Black Library.

== Career ==
Gav Thorpe was a games designer for Games Workshop beginning in 1994. His credits include the Inquisitor skirmish game, as well as work on several editions of Warhammer and Warhammer 40,000, and supplements for both game systems. He also designed the board game Gobbo's Banquet, and has written dozens of novels for the Black Library. He also wrote the script for the Mark of Chaos computer game. Thorpe stopped working at Games Workshop in 2008 to become a freelancer writer, but returned in 2009 with the Novella Space Hulk, and the short stories Call of the Lion and Renegades.

His 2024 novel for Games Workshop, The High Kâhl's Oath, was the first full-length novel of the faction "Leagues of Votann".

Thorpe lives in Nottingham, England.

== Bibliography ==
=== Legacy of Caliban trilogy ===
- Ravenwing (January 2013)
- Master of Sanctity (June 2014)
- The Unforgiven (July 2015)

=== Last Chancers ===
- Thirteenth Legion (December 2000)
- Kill Team (October 2001)
- Annihilation Squad (March 2004)
- Deliverance (short story)
- Liberty (short story)

=== Path of the Eldar ===
- Path of the Warrior (July 2010)
- Path of the Seer (September 2011)
- Path of the Outcast (September 2012))

=== Short stories ===
- Aenarion Published in Issue 12 of Hammer and Bolter October 2011
- The Divine Word Published in Black Library Weekender Anthology November 2012

=== Novels ===
- Space Hulk: The Novel (July 2010)

== Reception ==
In reviewing the Warhammer novel The Blades of Chaos (2003), critic Don D'Ammassa wrote that it is "better written than most similar novels", although it has "little to offer readers who aren't fond of this subgenre." D'Ammassa also reviewed The Heart of Chaos (2004), stating that "Thorpe always does a competent job and this one has a rousing finish."
