= Inferno! =

Inferno! (originally Carnage) was a bi-monthly magazine published from 1997 to 2004 by Games Workshop's publishing division, Black Library, which was initially just the name of the team brought together to work on Inferno!.

It presented fiction, artwork, and comics set in the fictional universe's of Games Workshop's fantasy and science fiction games. These initially included Warhammer Fantasy Battle, Warhammer 40,000, and Necromunda, and later added the Mordheim and Gorkamorka settings.

== Publication ==
Rick Priestley and Andy Jones of Warhammer, and author Marc Gascoigne, developed the idea for the Black Library which produced the magazine Inferno! as a result beginning in July 1997.

Inferno! was launched with a trial "issue zero" as a section in the Games Workshop house magazine White Dwarf (issue 210).

Issue 1 of the actual magazine was launched shortly afterwards under the editorship of Games Workshop staffer Andy Jones. The magazine settled into a standard format of two fantasy and two science fiction stories per issue, with ancillary features such as standalone artwork, comics, cutaway diagrams of fictional machines from the stories, maps of fictional battles, and mocked-up books, dossiers, or correspondence by characters in the settings. With the exception of one early comic series, Inferno! published individual, complete stories, not serials.

== Creators ==
Inferno! had a policy of accepting unsolicited submissions and publishing new authors. Many writers who went on to publish novels for Black Library, such as C.L. Werner and Ben Counter, began their professional writing careers with short stories in Inferno! The magazine also published stories by established science fiction authors such as Barrington J. Bayley and Brian Stableford.

== Warhammer Monthly ==
The success of Inferno!, along with the lessons learned and the contacts made during its early days, led to a spin-off comic, Warhammer Monthly. This produced longer comic stories in an anthology format common in British comics like 2000 AD (with whom it shared a lot of creators). As Marc Gascoigne puts it "It became obvious very quickly that the occasional comic strip in Inferno! along with the short stories was OK, but very soon what we needed to do was a proper comic, so about a year after Inferno! kicked in, Warhammer Monthly made its debut."

== Novels ==
Black Library's novel range also started life in Inferno!, "we had stories that were immediately thought of, at least internally by us, as pilots, tasters for a novel range"

== Cancellation ==
Inferno! was cancelled in November 2004 after publishing 46 issues.

== Relaunch ==
In 2018, Black Library relaunched Inferno! as a quarterly anthology series. The new Inferno! runs 300-400 pages and features serial and one-off short stories from both veteran Black Library authors and new writers. Each new volume has been accompanied by a limited time reprinting of issues of the original magazine: Issues 1–5 with Volume 1, 6–10 with Volume 2, 11–15 with Volume 3, and 16–25 with volume 4.

== See also ==
- Science fiction magazine
- Fantasy fiction magazine
- Horror fiction magazine
