= Mitchel Scanlon =

Mitchel Scanlon is a British writer of science fiction novels and comics. He wrote novels for the Warhammer 40,000 franchise, and novels featuring 2000 AD character Judge Anderson. He also writes a comic series called Tales of Hellbrandt Grimm.

== Biography ==
=== Warhammer 40,000 books ===
- Fifteen Hours (Black Library, 2005)
- Descent of Angels (Black Library, 2007)
- Call to Arms (Black Library, 2010)

=== Judge Anderson books ===
- Fear the Darkness (Black Flame, 2006)
- Red Shadows (Black Flame, 2006)
- Sins of the Father (Black Flame, 2007)

== Sources ==
- Lexicanum
- FictionDB
