= Guy Haley =

UK science fiction writer

- Born: 1973 (age 52–53); Yorkshire, England
- Occupation: Writer
- Writing career
- Period: 1993–present
- Genres: science fantasy, fantasy, science fiction

Guy Haley (born 1973) is an English writer of speculative fiction, predominantly known for his Richards & Klein Investigations series, as well as numerous fiction contributions to various Warhammer 40,000 series.

== Bibliography ==
=== Warhammer 40,000 ===
Contributed over 30 works to the greater Warhammer universe, with another 50 works to the following Warhammer 40,000, Warhammer Fantasy (setting), and Warhammer Age of Sigmar series:

- Adeptus Mechanicus (2019)
- Angels of Death (2013)
- Astra Militarum (2020)
- Blood Angels (2017–2022)
- Dark Imperium (2018–2021)
- Dawn of Fire (2020)
- Imperial Guard (2013–2016)
- Lords of the Space Marines (2013)
- Space Marine Battles (2013–2017)
- The Arkanaut’s Oath (2022)
- The Beast Arises (2016–2018)
- The Death of Integrity (2013)
- The End Times: Doom of the Old World (2015)
- The Ghosts of Barak-Minoz (2024)
- The Horus Heresy (2016–2020)
- The Realmgate Wars (2015–2016)
- The Siege of Terra (2019)
- Warlords of Karak Eight Peaks (2013)

=== Richards & Klein Investigations Series ===
- Nemesis Worm (2011)
- Reality 36 (2011)
- Omega Point (2012)

=== The Dreaming Cities Series ===
- The Emperor's Railroad (2016)
- The Ghoul King (2016)

=== Standalone Novels ===
- Champion of Mars (2012)
- Crash (2013)

=== Nonfiction ===
- Sci-Fi Chronicles: A Visual History of the Galaxy's Greatest Science Fiction. Nominated for a Grand Prix de l'Imaginaire award in 2016.

=== Critical studies and reviews of Haley's work ===
Sci-Fi Chronicles

- Sakers, Don (April 2015). "The Reference Library". Analog Science Fiction and Fact. 135 (4): 104–107.
