= List of Warhammer publications =

This is a list of supplements published for the Warhammer fantasy tabletop miniatures wargame.

== First edition (1983) ==
- Forces of Fantasy (1984)

== Second edition (1985) ==
- Blood Bath at Orc's Drift (1985)
- Blood on the Streets (1985)
- Terror of the Lichemaster (1986)
- Ravening Hordes: The Official Warhammer Battle Army Lists (1987)

== 4th edition (1992) ==
- Warhammer: Battle Magic (1992)
- Warhammer Armies: The Empire (1993)
- Warhammer Armies: High Elves (1993)
- Warhammer Armies: Dwarfs (1993)
- Warhammer Armies: Orcs & Goblins (1993)
- Warhammer Armies: Skaven (1993)
- Warhammer Armies: The Undead (1994)
- Warhammer Armies: Chaos (1994)
- Warhammer Armies: Dark Elves (1995)
- Warhammer Armies: Wood Elves (1996)
- Chronicles of War (1995)

== 5th edition (1996) ==
- Warhammer Armies: Bretonnia (1996)
- Warhammer Armies: Lizardmen (1997)
- Warhammer Armies: High Elves (1997)
- Champions of Chaos (1998)
- Warhammer Armies: Dogs of War (1998)
- Warhammer Armies: Vampire Counts (1999)

== 6th edition (2000) ==
- Warhammer Armies: The Empire (2000)
- Warhammer Armies: Orcs & Goblins (2000)
- Warhammer Armies: Dwarfs (2001)
- Warhammer Armies: Vampire Counts (2001)
- Warhammer Armies: Dark Elves (2001)
- Warhammer Armies: High Elves (2001)
- Warhammer Armies: Skaven (2002)
- Warhammer Armies: Hordes of Chaos (2002)
- Warhammer Armies: Tomb Kings (2003)
- Warhammer: Chronicles (2003)
- Warhammer Armies: Lizardmen (2003)
- Warhammer Armies: Beasts of Chaos (2003)
- Warhammer Armies: Bretonnia (2004)
- Warhammer Armies: Storm of Chaos (2004)
- Warhammer Armies: Ogre Kingdoms (2005)
- Warhammer Realms: Lustria (2005)
- Warhammer Armies: Wood Elves (2005)

== 7th edition (2006) ==
- The Battle for Skull Pass (2006)
- Warhammer Armies: Dwarfs (2006)
- Warhammer Armies: Orcs & Goblins (2006)
- Warhammer Armies: The Empire (2007)
- Warhammer Armies: High Elves (2007)
- Warhammer Armies: Vampire Counts (2008)
- Warhammer Armies: Daemons of Chaos (2008)
- Warhammer Armies: Dark Elves (2008)
- Warhammer Armies: Warriors of Chaos (2008)
- Warhammer Armies: Lizardmen (2009)
- Warhammer Armies: Skaven (2009)
- Warhammer Armies: Beastmen (2010)

== 8th edition (2010) ==
- Island of blood (2010)
- Warhammer Armies: Orcs & Goblins (2011)
- Warhammer Armies: Tomb Kings (2011)
- Warhammer Armies: Ogre Kingdoms (2011)
- Warhammer Armies: Vampire Counts (2012)
- Warhammer Armies: The Empire (2012)
- Warhammer Armies: Warriors of Chaos (2013)
- Warhammer Armies: Daemons of Chaos (2013)
- Warhammer Armies: High Elves (2013)
- Warhammer Armies: Lizardmen (2013)
- Warhammer Armies: Dark Elves (2013)
- Warhammer Armies: Dwarfs (2014)
- Warhammer Armies: Wood Elves (2014)

== See also ==
- Warhammer Army Book
