= List of Warhammer Army Books and Supplements =

The following is a list of Army Books and Supplements for the various armies released for the Games Workshop Warhammer Fantasy Battle game.

An Army Book in the Warhammer Fantasy tabletop wargame, is a rules supplement containing information concerning a particular army, environment, or worldwide campaign. Army Books for particular armies were introduced for the fourth edition of the game (prior to that all armies were included in the main rulebook). The sixth edition rendered these obsolete. Until superseded by newer versions, the 6th edition and later books remain valid for the newer editions of Warhammer.

Games Workshop has also released various expansions over the years, including a siege rules supplement and campaign expansions. Expansions and Supplements may or may not be valid over multiple editions, though generally they cycle similarly to the Army Books.

An Army Book normally contains:

- Background - Information about the race and its place in the Warhammer world. This includes artwork, short stories, maps, timelines and copies of fictional documents.
- Bestiary - A list of the units, characters and war machines that can be chosen for use in a battle. This includes their characteristic values, information on their weapon options, and any limitations on their use, as well as background information on each unit. An Army's special magic lore (if applicable) and special magic items are listed here.
- Hobby section - Information on collecting, building and painting an army from the army book. This features outstanding example models painted by the Games Workshop 'Eavy Metal Team as well as Games Workshop's Army Painters and veteran hobbyists.
- Army List - Each entry from the bestiary is arranged by type (Lord, Hero, Core, Special, Rare) and given a points value, with more powerful units costing more points, so that battles are fought between balanced armies. Options and costs are listed here.

== Warhammer: The Old World ==
In January 2024 Warhammer Fantasy Battle was relaunched as Warhammer: The Old World. Warhammer Age of Sigmar had replaced WFB in 2015 with the narrative that the Warhammer World had been destroyed.

Warhammer: The Old World Army books
Army book	Release date	ISBN	Notes
Forces of Fantasy	January 2024	ISBN 978-1837790142	expansion to the Old World Rulebook with lists for "Dwarfen Mountain Holds, Empire of Man, Kingdom of Bretonnia, Wood Elf Realms, High Elf Realms"
Ravening Hordes	January 2024	ISBN 978-1837790111	expansion to the Old World Rulebook - covered "Orc and Goblin Tribes, Warriors of Chaos, Beastmen Brayherds, Tomb Kings of Khemri"
Arcane Journal: Kingdom of Bretonnia	January 2024	ISBN 978-1837790531	
Arcane Journal: Tomb Kings of Khemri	January 2024	ISBN 978-1837790500	
Arcane Journal: Orc & Goblin Tribes	May 2024	ISBN 978-1837790579	
Arcane Journal: Dwarfen Mountain Holds	August 2024	ISBN 978-1837790609	
Arcane Journal: Warriors of Chaos	September 2024	ISBN 978-1837790630	
Arcane Journal: Empire of Man	January 2025	ISBN 978-1837790678	
Arcane Journal: High Elf Realms	March 2025	ISBN 978-1837790746	
Arcane Journal: Wood Elf Realms	June 2025	ISBN 978-1837790852	
Arcane Journal: Beastmen Brayherds	June 2025		
Arcane Journal – Armies of Grand Cathay			
Arcane Journal: Dawn of the Storm Dragon			Further rules for the Armies of Grand Cathay. Includes allying with Empire of Man

== Previous edition Warhammer army books ==
Army lists were published in Ravening Hordes (subtitled "The Official Warhammer Battle Army Lists) in 1987

In 1988 and 1990, the forces of Chaos were given army lists through two books Realm of Chaos: Slaves to Darkness (forces of Khorne and Slaanesh), and Realm of Chaos: The Lost and the Damned (Nurgle and Tzeentch) respectively

Starting with the 4th edition rules, individual Army books were published for various races and realms of the Warhammer world that had coinciding miniatures armies to play the Warhammer Fantasy Battles tabletop game. Earlier versions of the Warhammer Fantasy Battle Game did not have individual Army books

=== 4th Edition ===
4th Edition WFB was released in October 1992; it was the first edition to use separate army books. They were softbound and carried "Warhammer Supplement" on their covers.

4th Edition Army books
Book/army	Release date	ISBN	Replaced by
Warhammer Armies: Wood Elves	May 1996	ISBN 1-872372-45-7	Ravening Hordes
Warhammer Armies: Dark Elves	July 1995	ISBN 1-872372-88-0	Ravening Hordes
White Dwarf Presents: Chaos Dwarfs (Note: A compilation of articles published in White Dwarf magazine)	December 1994	ISBN 1-872372-80-5	Ravening Hordes, then discontinued, then Tamurkhan: Throne of Chaos from Warhammer Forge
Warhammer Armies: Chaos	August 1994	Boxed set, no ISBN	5th Edition Realm of Chaos Box
Warhammer Armies: Undead	May 1994	ISBN 1-872372-67-8	5th Edition Vampire Counts Army Book and Ravening Hordes for Tomb Kings
Warhammer Armies: Skaven	December 1993	ISBN 1-872372-69-4	Ravening Hordes
Warhammer Armies: Dwarfs	June 1993	ISBN 1-872372-66-X	Ravening Hordes
Warhammer Armies: Orcs & Goblins	April 1993	ISBN 1-872372-64-3	Ravening Hordes
Warhammer Armies: High Elves	February 1993	ISBN 1-872372-63-5	5th Edition High Elves Army Book
Warhammer Armies: The Empire	January 1993	ISBN 1-87237235-X	Ravening Hordes

=== 5th Edition ===
5th Edition was released in October 1996.

5th Edition
Army	Release date	ISBN	Replaced by
Vampire Counts	June 1999	ISBN 1-869893-75-1	Ravening Hordes
Dogs of War	September 1998	ISBN 1-872372-02-3	Regiments of Renown, then discontinued
Champions of Chaos (Chaos Special Characters)	May 1998	ISBN 1-872372-29-5	Ravening Hordes
Realm of Chaos	January 1998	ISBN 1-872372-60-0 (2nd Edition); ISBN 1-869893-90-5 (1st Edition)	Ravening Hordes
High Elves	May 1997	ISBN 978-1-872372-21-1 (2nd edition)	Ravening Hordes
Lizardmen	February 1997	ISBN 1-872372-56-2	Ravening Hordes
Bretonnia	November 1996, 1999	ISBN 1-872372-59-7	Ravening Hordes

=== 6th Edition ===
6th Edition was released in October 2000. All army books for 5th Edition were initially replaced by a 36-page publication Ravening Hordes (described as "a collection of 15 “get-you-by” army lists for veteran Warhammer generals"), distributed for free.

6th Edition
Army	Release date	ISBN	Replaced by
Ravening Hordes	October 2000	ISBN 1-84154-063-3	Each Army's 6th edition army book—15 "Get You By" Army Lists for Warhammer - the Game of Fantasy Battles
The Empire	October 2000	ISBN 1-84154-059-5	7th Edition The Empire Army Book
Orcs & Goblins	November 2000	ISBN 1-84154-060-9	7th Edition Orcs & Goblins Army Book
Dwarfs	January 2001	ISBN 1-84154-066-8	Second 6th Edition Dwarfs Army Book (2006)
Dwarfs	January 2006	ISBN 1-84154-690-9	8th Edition Dwarfs Army Book
Wood Elves	September 2005	ISBN 1-84154-680-1	8th Edition Wood Elves Army Book
Beasts of Chaos	August 2003	ISBN 1-84154-387-X	7th Edition Beastmen Army Book
Ogre Kingdoms	January 2005	ISBN 1-84154-531-7	8th Edition Ogre Kingdoms Army Book
Bretonnia	February 2004	ISBN 1-84154-450-7	6th Edition was the final edition published
Lizardmen	May 2003	ISBN 1-84154-356-X	7th Edition Lizardmen Army Book
Tomb Kings	January 2003	ISBN 1-84154-336-5	8th Edition Tomb Kings Army Book
Hordes of Chaos	June 2002	ISBN 1-84154-222-9	7th Edition Warriors of Chaos and Daemons of Chaos Army Books
Skaven	March 2002	ISBN 1-84154-185-0	7th Edition Skaven Army Book
High Elves	January 2002	ISBN 1-84154-175-3	7th Edition High Elves Army Book
Dark Elves	June 2001	ISBN 1-84154-083-8	7th Edition Dark Elves Army Book
Vampire Counts	April 2001	ISBN 1-84154-080-3	7th Edition Vampire Counts Army Book

In White Dwarf magazines "Warhammer Chronicles" previewed army lists for Lizardmen (WD no. 256, April 2001), Bretonnia (WD261, September 2001), Wood elves (wd269, May 2002), and Beast of chaos (WD275, November 2002), that replaced their Ravening Hordes list, and was replaced by their army books later in the 6th edition. Dogs of War got their main list and Regiments of Renown -list in back to back issues (White Dwarf 251 and 252) that were never replaced. Daemon horde got the same sort of preview army list in Annual 2002 (November 2001). The preview lists were also published in Warhammer Annual 2002 and Warhammer Chronicles 2003 compliations

=== 7th Edition ===
7th edition was released in September 2006.

7th Edition Army Books
Army	Release date	ISBN	Replaced by
Orcs & Goblins	October 2006	ISBN 978-1-84154-785-5	8th Edition Orcs & Goblins Army Book
The Empire	January 2007	ISBN 978-1-84154-799-2	8th Edition The Empire Army Book
High Elves	November 2007	ISBN 978-1-84154-846-3	8th Edition High Elves Army Book
Vampire Counts	March 2008	ISBN 978-1-84154-863-0	8th Edition Vampire Counts Army Book
Daemons of Chaos	May 2008	ISBN 978-1-84154-883-8	8th Edition Daemons of Chaos Army Book
Dark Elves	August 2008	ISBN 978-1-84154-850-0	8th Edition Dark Elves Army Book
Warriors of Chaos	November 2008	ISBN 978-1-84154-898-2	8th Edition Warriors of Chaos Army Book
Lizardmen	February 2009	ISBN 978-1-84154-918-7	8th Edition Lizardmen Army Book
Skaven	November 2009	ISBN 978-1-84154-943-9	No army book was published for 8th edition
Beastmen	February 2010	ISBN 978-1-84154-956-9	No army book was published for 8th edition

7th Edition supplement
Supplement	Release Date	Notes	ISBN
Mighty Empires	2007	Campaign Expansion	ISBN N/A
Legendary Battles	2008	Large Army Campaign Expansion from White Dwarf	ISBN N/A

=== 8th Edition ===
8th Edition was released July 2010. 8th Edition Army Books are hardcover and full colour.

8th Edition Army Books
Army	Release Date	ISBN
Wood Elves	May 2014	ISBN 978-1782532873
Dwarfs	February 2014	ISBN 978-1-78253-239-2
Dark Elves	October 2013	ISBN 978-1782530947
Lizardmen	August 2013	ISBN 978-1782530534
High Elves	May 2013	ISBN 978-1782530084
Daemons of Chaos	March 2013	ISBN 978-1908872838
Warriors of Chaos	February 2013	ISBN 978-1908872647
The Empire	April 2012	ISBN 978-1907964688
Vampire Counts	January 2012	ISBN 978-1907964275
Ogre Kingdoms	September 2011	ISBN 978-1-907964-11-4
Tomb Kings	May 2011	ISBN 978-1841549965
Orcs & Goblins	March 2011	ISBN 978-1841549866

== Supplements ==
=== 3rd Edition ===
Supplement	Notes	Release date
Warhammer Siege	Siege warfare expansion - covered both WFB and WH40K - released alongside "The Mighty Fortress", a modular castle produced in expanded polystrene	1992

=== 4th edition ===
4th edition supplements
Supplement	Notes	ISBN	Release date
Battle Magic	Box set of cards and rules for magic in WFB 4th Edition	unknown	December 1992
Arcane Magic	Second Magic Expansion for 4th Edition. Box set of rules, cards and counters	unknown	February 1995
Chronicles of War (White Dwarf Presents)	Box set of card scenery (three buildings), new magic items, and a compilation of articles from White Dwarf Magazine,	ISBN 978-1872372914	December 1995

=== 5th edition ===
Supplement	Notes	ISBN	Release date
Warhammer Magic	5th Edition Magic rules and cards	ISBN 1-872372-09-0	December 1996
Tears of Isha	Campaign expansion, Card scenery	unknown	1998
Perilous Quest	Campaign expansion, Card scenery	unknown	1997
Circle of Blood	Campaign expansion, Card scenery	unknown	1997
Idol of Gork	Campaign expansion, Card scenery	unknown	1997
The Grudge of Drong	Campaign expansion, Card scenery	unknown	1997
Warhammer Siege	Siege Warfare expansion	ISBN 1-869893-44-1	August 1998

=== 6th edition ===
Supplement	Notes	ISBN	Release date
Dark Shadows	Campaign expansion	ISBN 978-1-84154-198-3	August 2001
Warhammer Annual 2002	Q&A, errata, etc.	ISBN 1-84154-165-6	2001
Warhammer Skirmish	Skirmish scenarios	ISBN 978-8374600125	2002
Warhammer Chronicles 2003	Q&A, Errata, etc.	ISBN 1-84154-296-2	2003
The General's Compendium	Campaigns, scenarios & More	ISBN 1-84154-436-1	2003
Warhammer Chronicles 2004	Q&A, Errata, etc.	ISBN 1-84154-422-1	2003
Storm of Chaos	Campaign expansion	ISBN 1-84154-460-4	June 2004
Lustria	Campaign expansion	ISBN 1-84154-644-5	May 2005
Conquest of the New World	Campaign expansion	ISBN 978-1841545929	2005

=== 7th edition ===
Supplement	Notes	ISBN	Release date
Mighty Empires	Campaign expansion (Note: The 1990 Mighty Empires board game could be used to add strategic layer to WFB as well as played standalone)	ISBN N/A	2007
Legendary Battles	Large Army Campaign expansion from White Dwarf	ISBN N/A	2008

=== 8th edition ===
8th Edition supplements
Supplement	Notes'	ISBN	Release Date
The End Times: Archaon	Volume 5 of the End Times Expansion, contains the Grand Legion of the Everchosen list	ISBN 978-1849709422	March 2015
The End Times: Thanquol	Volume 4 of the End Times Expansion	ISBN 978-1849709415	January 2015
The End Times: Khaine	Volume 3 of the End Times Expansion, contains the combined Elves army lists	ISBN 978-1849709408	November 2014
The End Times: Glottkin	Volume 2 of the End Times Expansion, contains the Legions of Chaos army list	ISBN 978-1849709392	October 2014
The End Times: Nagash	Volume 1 of the End Times Expansion, contains the Undead Legions army list	ISBN 978-1849709385	August 2014
Warhammer Battlefields: The Underway	Campaign expansion	Digital Release	February 2014
Sigmar's Blood	Campaign expansion	ISBN 978-1782531470	December 2013
Crypt Scavengers	Ghoul Themed Formation	Digital Release	December 2013
Creatures of the Chaos Wastes	Chaos Monster Themed Formation	Digital Release	December 2013
The Restless Dead	Skeleton Themed Formation	Digital Release	December 2013
Be'lakor, The Dark Master	Lord unit for Daemons and Warriors of Chaos	Digital Release	December 2013
Scrolls of Binding Compendium	Monster Expansion for Storm of Magic	Digital Release	December 2013
Blood in the Snow	Seasonal Scenario	Digital Release	December 2013
Vanguard Clash	Linked Battles Scenario	Digital Release	December 2013
Triumph and Treachery	Multiplayer Games Expansion	ISBN 978-1782530756	November 2013
Warhammer Battlefields: Northern Wastes	Campaign expansion	Digital Release	October 2013
Warhammer Battlefields: Border Wars	Campaign expansion	Digital Release	August 2013
Warhammer Battlefields: Lustria	Campaign expansion	Digital Release	August 2013
Civil War	White Dwarf rules for battles between forces from the same Army Book, also released Digitally	N/A	June–August 2012
Monstrous Arcanum	Monsters and Campaign expansion by Warhammer Forge	ISBN 978-1907964916	April 2012
Blood in the Badlands	Campaign expansion, Siege rule	ISBN 978-1907964466	December 2011
Tamurkhan: Throne of Chaos	Campaign expansion by Warhammer Forge; Contains the Chaos Dwarf army list	ISBN 978-1907964657	October 2011
Storm of Magic	Magic and Monsters Expansion	ISBN 978-1907964077	July 2011
