= Warhammer armies =

Warhammer armies or Armies can refer to either

- Armies of Warhammer within the Warhammer Fantasy Battle or Warhammer 40,000 games
- A series of publications, Warhammer Army Book or Codex (Warhammer 40,000), that contain the rules and story for the armies in the game
