= Night Goblins =

Night Goblins may refer to:

- Night Goblins (1923 book), a 1923 book by William Hughes Mearns illustrated by Ralph L. Boyer
- Night Goblins in Orcs and Goblins (Warhammer)
