= Blood on the Streets =

Blood on the Streets is a game supplement published by Games Workshop in 1985 for the fantasy tabletop miniature wargame Warhammer Fantasy Battle.

== Contents ==
Blood on the Streets contains a 22-page Gamemaster's Booklet, and sixteen cardstock sheets from which twelve model buildings can be cut out and constructed. The book was designed by A.V. Szczepankiewicz, and the cut-out buildings were designed by Dave Andrews.

The twelve 25 mm scale buildings that can be constructed include:

- a town hall
- a tavern
- a manor house
- a cottage
- a shop
- a hovel,
- stables,
- a bakery (can also be used as a smithy or mill)
- a temple
- a jail
- a two-story house
- a brewery

The Gamemaster's Book contains statistics for each of the buildings, as well as details of "The Riding", a small county that contains three villages — Shoodthorpe, Maybie, and Averidge. Important non-player characters that live in the region are described. Regular events such as the annual Shoodthorpe–Maybie Skullball match, and the Maybie Frog Swallowing Day are also detailed.

== Reception ==
In the July 1988 edition of Dragon (Issue #135), Ken Rolston called this supplement "a surprisingly amiable collection of village settings." Although he admired the buildings, which he called "convincingly medieval... pleasingly rough and irregular", he also thought that "the accompanying booklet describing three villages turns out to be a real treat too." Rolston commented that the descriptions of the local personalities "have imaginative backgrounds and motivations, well devised for generating FRPG [fantasy role-playhing game] narrative conflicts." He concluded that "The most attractive features of the pack are the cardboard model buildings, which are first class. The villages and personalities described in the Gamesmaster’s Guide are clever and colorful... There are plenty of narrative hooks here to inspire a game master."
