= Orcs and Goblins (Warhammer) =

Game supplement

Orc & Goblins
- Seventh edition
- Author: Matthew Ward, et al.
- Cover artist: Alex Boyd
- Series: Warhammer Armies
- Genre: Wargaming
- Publisher: Games Workshop
- Publication date: 2011
- ISBN: 978-1-84154-785-5
- Preceded by: Orcs & Goblins 8th Edition

Orcs & Goblins is a supplemental book for the Warhammer Fantasy Battle tabletop game, first published in 1993. The phrase "orcs & goblins" also refers collectively to all of the races that are described in this book, which includes other "greenskins" as well. The book includes background information, illustrations, and game rules for these races. The Orcs and Goblins represent a generic Dark Ages warband army with little internal cohesion and discipline, and relying on the ferocious charge and individual fighting skills rather than organized generalship.

== Contents ==
Orcs & Goblins contains a number of short stories that provide an illustrative fictional history of the Orcs in the Warhammer Fantasy universe. These stories center around the formation of WAAAGH!s and the resulting campaigns.

=== Gorbad Ironclaw ===
Gorbad Ironclaw, atop his vicious boar Gnarla, was the mightiest Warlord that ever lived (in the warhammer fantasy universe). Gorbad Ironclaw and his tribe, the Ironclaw Orcs, absorbed the Broken Tooth tribe along with the local Goblin and Night Goblin tribes, to create a massive force of Greenskin warriors. The tribe marched through Black Fire Pass to attack the Empire under the Emperor Sigismund. Gorbad's army conquered the territories of Solland and Wissenland, but Gorbad himself was wounded in the fighting. At the fortress of Altdorf, the Waaagh! was kept at bay outside the city walls. Gorbad unleashed Wyverns upon the city, who threw the defenders into disarray but were ultimately repelled without achieving their main objective, which was to destroy the city gates. Eventually, the lack of progress and Gorbad's injury took their toll on morale, and the army disintegrated. The remnants of Gorbad's tribe were ambushed and defeated on their way home by a Dwarf army under the King of Karaz-a-Karak. It is not known if Gorbad survived the encounter.

=== Azhag the Slaughterer ===
An already powerful warlord who ruled over a great many tribes in the Badlands, Azhag's tale truly began after he unearthed an ancient magic crown in the ruined city of Todtheim. But this was no simple trinket: this was the Crown of Sorcery, an ancient artifact of the Great Necromancer, Nagash, and the ancient Liche's insidious spirit still clung to the artifact. When Azhag put the crown on, Nagash's spirit began to dominate the Orc's crude, uncomplicated psyche, and from then on, Azhag's primal power was combined with Nagash's tactical genius and arcane fury.

The power of the Crown allowed Azhag to destroy the rival Warbosses and ensure the loyalty of his followers. Prior to battle, Azhag would lay out his plan of attack, speaking in a decidedly un-Orcy voice heavy with the weight of centuries, then bellow at his ladz to get moving. However, Azhag's continued victories ensured the support of his greenskin followers: they didn't care that he "talked funny," only that he showed them "where da fighting wuz!"

Armed with Nagash's tactical skill and sorcerous might, which granted Azhag impressive magical skill, and mounted on the back of his pet wyvern Skullmuncha, Azhag's uncannily organised and tactically skilled WAAAGH! invaded the Empire, laying waste to the eastern province of Ostermark. They ravaged the province for many long months before Azhag's force was finally defeated at the Battle of Osterwald. In the ferocious fighting, Werner von Kriegstadt, Grand Master of the Knights Panther, killed Azhag in single combat and recovered the Crown of Sorcery. Without his tactical mind and force of will to lead them, the Orcs that had followed Azhag fled into the forests and hills of Ostland. As for the Crown of Sorcery, after much debate between those who wanted it preserved and studied, and those who wanted it destroyed so its evil could pose no more threat, the Grand Theogonist took it back to Altdorf and sealed it in the Imperial Vaults, where it would remain for all eternity.

=== Grimgor Ironhide ===
Grimgor Ironhide is the most violent Black Orc Warboss ever to exist. He leads tribes of vicious Orcs to lay waste all across the Old World. His personal bodyguard of Black Orcs are known as "Da Immortulz" and they are almost as dangerous as he is. Grimgor is a fearsome fighter who can inflict enormous casualties upon opposing units. He "rests" by going into the tunnels of Red Eye Mountain (the Former Dwarf hold of Karak Ungor) that is held by Night Goblin allies. Here he slaughters vast numbers of Skaven, who are constantly trying to take the keep from the Greenskins. Unknown to Grimgor he has often got close to the Skaven area known as "Hell Pit", where the Skaven carry out their twisted experiments. Grimgor leaves the tunnels when he tires of killing Skaven, but invariably returns for another "rest" when the urge to explore and kill reasserts itself.

Grimgor's fighting skill is such that he has been fought to a standstill only once - by the Champion of Chaos Crom the Conqueror. This is partly explained by the mauling of Grimgor's army on that occasion and the fleeing of the survivors, which left Grimgor alone on the field of battle.

=== Units ===
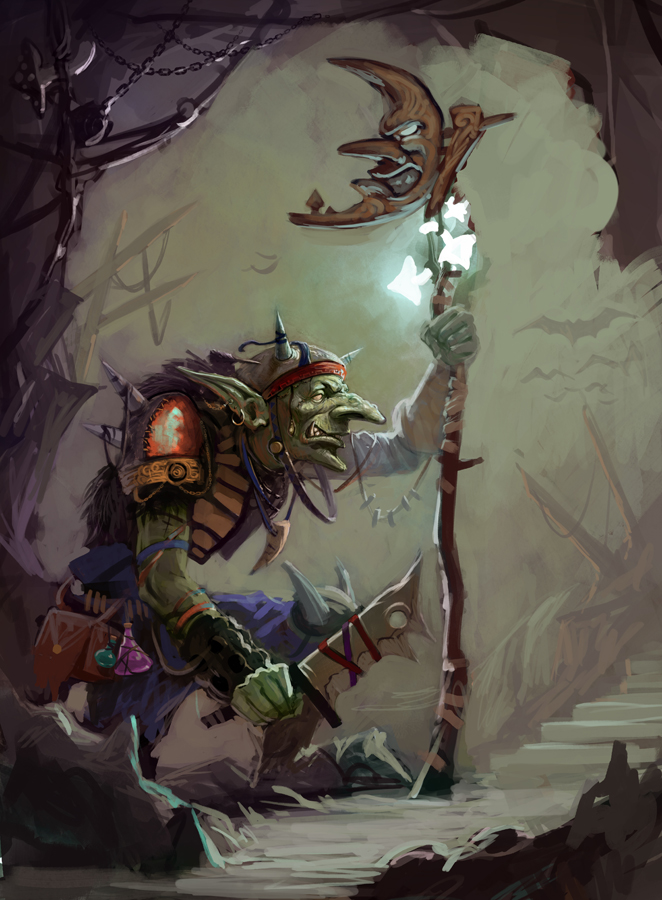
A Goblin

- Orcs are large creatures with long arms and short legs, huge slabs of muscle move under tough green skin, and their jaws are lined with vicious fangs that jut out from their underbite. They have beady red eyes, a generally foul demeanor, and are naturally bald. Normally six feet tall, they are up to seven feet tall when stretched out of their characteristic stoop. They respect power and strength, and naturally tend towards becoming bigger and stronger as they rise through their society. While they lack the education of more advanced races, Orcs possess immense cunning and are quick learners, but rarely adopt new tactics to replace their fondness for close quarters brutality.
- Goblins are much smaller and skinnier than the Orcs and have long, pointed noses. They are between 4 and 5 feet high, seldom reaching the height of a man. Goblins are more common than orcs, and deceitful to a fault. They prefer attacking their opponents in the back or from a safe distance. When pressed into battle Goblins seek safety in numbers, attacking in large mobs. They are afraid of Elves because they "stink funny."
- Snotlings are smaller and weaker than goblins; about half their height, although there is no set point where a large snotling becomes a small goblin, or vice versa. They are far less intelligent than goblins and can do little except in imitation of others. They congregate on the edges of greenskin villages, hunting (and being hunted by) squigs, although they are often too terrified to approach these strange creatures.
- Gnoblars were not well known to the Old World until expeditions from the Ogre Kingdoms became commonplace. They serve as "pets" who are used to scavenge battlefields and carry luggage. Gnoblars are between normal goblins and snotlings in size and hence hierarchy. Gnoblars are not part of the Orcs & Goblins army in Warhammer Fantasy. Gnoblars do jobs for the Ogres in return for the Ogres' protection.

== Reception ==
=== Reviews ===
In Issue 203 of Dragon #203 (March 1994), Bob Bigelow liked the fact that the details were told through stories that "details animosity levels between orc and goblin and the importance of shamans." He also noted that "The armies list is split between the different types of orcs and goblins, as well as monsters' allies." Bigelow concluded that the book has "excellent line drawings and action illustrations as well as [its] practical game value [...] well worth the price to anyone who wishes to campaign."

Other reviews:

- Świat Gier Komputerowych #135
