= High elf =

High elf may refer to:

- Calaquendi, an elvish race from J. R. R. Tolkien's The Lord of the Rings
- High Elves, a race in the Warhammer Fantasy setting
  - Aeldari a.k.a. Eldar, their Warhammer 40,000 counterparts
- Quel'Dorei, descendants of the Night Elves in the Warcraft universe who later mostly became Blood Elves
- Altmer, a race of elves in the Elder Scrolls universe
- In Dungeons & Dragons, High Elves is one of the terms for:
  - Grey Elves
  - Moon Elves
  - Gold Elves
  - Sun Elves

== See also ==
- Dark elf (disambiguation)
- Elves in fiction
