= Warhammer Age of Sigmar: Storm Ground =

2021 video game

- Developer: Gasket Games
- Publisher: Focus Home Interactive
- Series: Age of Sigmar
- Platforms: Microsoft Windows; Nintendo Switch; PlayStation 4; Xbox One
- Release: May 27, 2021
- Genre: Turn-based strategy
- Modes: Single-player, multiplayer

Warhammer Age of Sigmar: Storm Ground is a turn-based strategy game developed by Gasket Games and published by Focus Home Interactive in collaboration with Games Workshop. Based on the Warhammer: Age of Sigmar miniature wargame, the game released for Windows, Nintendo Switch, PlayStation 4 and Xbox One on May 27, 2021.

== Gameplay ==
Age of Sigmar: Storm Ground is a turn-based strategy game. It features three different factions: the Stormcast Eternals, the Nighthaunt and the Maggotkin. Each faction has their own unique hero units and characteristics. For instance, the Stormcast Eternals are equipped with sturdy armor, making them hard to kill, while the Maggotkin can change the landscape of a map. In a hex map, players can cast spells and perform various ranged and melee attacks with their units. As the player progresses, they can unlock new weapons, armor, and spells for their units and heroes. Unlocks may also show up in a hex as items stored inside loot containers. In addition to a campaign mode, which incorporates elements commonly found in roguelike games, the game also features online competitive multiplayer modes.

== Development ==
The game was developed by Gasket Games, a video game development studio based in Vancouver, Canada. The team included veterans who previously worked on the Dawn of War series at Relic Entertainment, and Homeworld: Deserts of Kharak at Blackbird Interactive. It was the first video game adaptation of the Age of Sigmar universe. Despite this, Games Workshop gave Gasket Games freedom to create new lore and story that add to the Black Library.

Publisher Focus Home Interactive announced its partnership with Gasket Games in April 2019. The game was officially announced during Gamescom: Opening Night Live in August 2020. The game was released on May 27, 2021 for Windows, PlayStation 4, Xbox One and Nintendo Switch.

== Reception ==
Warhammer Age of Sigmar: Storm Ground received "mixed or average" reviews for Microsoft Windows and PlayStation 4, according to review aggregator Metacritic.

Reception

Aggregate score
Aggregator	Score
Metacritic	PC: 64/100; PS4: 61/100

Review scores
Publication	Score
IGN	5/10
Nintendo Life	5/10
PC Gamer (US)	59/100
PCGamesN	7/10
