= Dark elf =

Dark elf may refer to:

- Dökkálfar or dark elves, a type of elf in Norse mythology.
- Svartálfar or black elves, a type of elf in Norse mythology
- Moriquendi, a fictional race of elves in J. R. R. Tolkien's legendarium
- Drow, or dark elves, a fictional subrace of elves in Dungeons & Dragons
  - The Dark Elf Trilogy, a series of novels by R. A. Salvatore set in the Dungeons & Dragons universe
- Dark Elves (Marvel Cinematic Universe), a fictional race of elves and the antagonists of Thor: The Dark World
- Dark Elves (Warhammer), a type of elf in the Warhammer fantasy series
  - Drukhari a.k.a. Dark Eldar, their Warhammer 40,000 counterparts
- Dunmer, a type of elf in the Elder Scrolls fantasy series

== See also ==
- High elf (disambiguation)
