= Mighty Empires =

Board game by Games Workshop

- Manufacturers: Games Workshop
- Designers: Rick Priestley, Nigel Stillman
- Publishers: Games Workshop
- Years active: 1990
- Players: 2-3
- Chance: Dice rolling

Mighty Empires was a board game published by Games Workshop. It was intended to add a strategic layer to Warhammer Fantasy Battle giving rise to campaigns where the results of one battle would affect later battles, although the game included simple point based rules if the players did not have Warhammer Fantasy Battle or were unwilling to play out each battle.

== Gameplay ==
=== Setup ===
Prior to starting, the game map has to be assembled. The board consists of 112 separate map hexagons representing coastal, highland and lowland ( plains) and river valley terrain, which are to be placed together to form a unique playing field. Players took turns to draw from face down stacks separated into the four types and place the tile on the map touching two existing tiles. Specific rules direct how the map tiles can be placed in order to maintain a sense of realism about the geography. Beyond the new tile having to match at least one edge on an already placed tile, a river should continue until it terminates in a coastal, lake or swamp tile, rather than terminating abruptly by a blocking mountain or plains tile. Players alternately drew and placed the tiles starting around a central 'Highlands' (mountain tile) until all were placed.

Players then chose starting positions (certain map hexes are designated as "capital spots") and then roll a six-sided die to see what settlements already exist in the map hexes immediately surrounding their capital.

The points worth of starting armies are then determined, either randomly (a number of dice rolled according to the number of settlements in that player's realm) or based on the players' available models. These are then divided into army "banners" (Note: The points value of each banner was left to the players to record during the course of the game.) (a playing piece representing an army) and placed anywhere in the player's realm.

Play is then commenced.

=== Campaign Season ===
Each year was split into the spring equinox, six summer months (during which the banners moved and fought), autumn equinox and winter (a "book keeping" phase).

Spells could be cast during the equinoxes which could have significant effects on the campaign season. The spells available between the spring and autumn equinoxes differ.

During each summer month, the active player first calculates subsistence costs for each army. Subsistence represents the food and supplies an army would require and can be taken by foraging from the currently occupied map tile. Any shortfall must be made by baggage the army carries, else it can suffer troop loss.

Each army then scouted in the direction they wished to move to. If the tile was unexplored, the contents of the tile was determined by a random rolling against a chart with outcomes differing according to the tile type. Depending on the results, the army could encounter a friendly settlement, an independent settlement, nothing at all or a random event.
If a settlement was revealed the appropriate playing piece was put in the tile.

The army could then move into the map tile if desired, provided there was no blocking terrain. Since a scouting roll was required every time an army wished to move, it was possible that the army could head in the wrong direction or not move at all, even if the target tile had been previously explored.

In the event that a hostile settlement or an opposing army was encountered, a battle was then fought. The outcome of the battle could be determined by a simple points based system or the players could use their Warhammer Fantasy Battle armies and rules to determine the result. (Note: The points value of the banner(s) was used 1-for-1 to determine the size of the army the player could use in WFB.) In the case of sieges, the battle could be played out using the additional Warhammer Siege rules for Warhammer Fantasy Battle.

After any battles had been fought, an army could raze the map tile, rendering it useless for further subsistence for a period of time, and then reorganise any armies in the same tile, including their baggage.

The next player then took their turn, following the same procedure. After all players took their turn, the next month began, with a random player starting first for that month.

After all six months had been completed, the autumn equinox spells were cast, then the winter season procedure began.

During the winter season, revenue (taxes) was collected, new units could be recruited, diplomacy and espionage could be performed and new settlements constructed. Existing settlements could be upgraded (a village to a fortress or a city), changing the playing piece for one representing the new status. The winter season also had a random element with "Winter Events" determined by a random roll for each player. The events could be positive or negative effects with extreme rolls of 2 and 12 triggering the "Dragon Rage" which results in razing of tiles. (Note: The Winter Events Dragon Rage was a more extreme form of a Dragon Rage that could be triggered during scouting in the summer months)

The game turn then restarted with the spring equinox.

Simple rules for naval warfare were also included, although the later released Man o' War system could ostensibly be substituted.

== Additional rules ==
The main rules were written so they world could be that of a part of the larger Warhammer Old World setting or a "completely different fantasy world" that shared Warhammer races and creatures. Expanded rules for the different races featured in Warhammer were included with different benefits and limitations for each for example orcs and goblins suffered double penalties for shortfalls as the Orcs and Goblins cannibalise the smaller individuals in the army, while Skaven (rat creatures) could only subsist from razed tiles.

A random name generator for several races was also included.

White Dwarf published additional rules for buildings (such as Wizard towers and bridges), massive siege units and printed additional map tiles.

== 2007 Edition ==
This game was re-released in 2007 with new plastic pieces with a scaled down version of the rules, to be used to drive a campaign of miniature battles.
