= Blood Bath at Orc's Drift =

Blood Bath at Orc's Drift is a supplement published by Citadel Miniatures in 1985 for the second edition of the fantasy wargame Warhammer.

== Contents ==
Blood Bath at Orc's Drift is a wargame pack consisting of four scenarios that form a lead up to a major battle scenario. The contents include:

- a scenario book
- command sheets
- cardstock buildings
- cardboard counters
- a poster map
- a badge

== Publication history ==
Blood Bath at Orc's Drift was designed by Gary Chalk, Joe Dever and Ian Page, with artwork by Chalk and cartography by David Andrews. Citadel Miniatures also produced a line of 25 mm miniatures to match the warriors in each scenario, and offered consumers a special deal to buy them for use with this supplement.

Chalk designed the supplement after the 1964 British movie Zulu starring Michael Caine and Stanley Baker.

== Reception ==
Jon Sutherland reviewed Blood Bath at Orc's Drift for White Dwarf #68, giving it an overall rating of 9 out of 10, and stated that "If you like Warhammer, you'll love Blood Bath at Orcs Drift - it's not often that something like this is attempted and never has it been done so well. The years of wargaming experience behind it really show through. Unreservedly recommended, it's a must for all Warhammer addicts."
