= Forces of Fantasy =

Forces of Fantasy is a 1984 game supplement for Warhammer published by Games Workshop.

== Contents ==
Forces of Fantasy is a set of three volumes of material to expand the Warhammer system, and corrects errors found in the original game.

== Reception ==
Jon Sutherland reviewed Forces of Fantasy for White Dwarf #55, giving it an overall rating of 7 out of 10, and stated that "I would recommend Forces of Fantasy to those people who enjoyed Warhammer but were unhappy with some parts of it - the additions will undoubtedly improve it and hopefully not just complicate it."

Richard Lee reviewed Forces of Fantasy for Imagine magazine, and stated that "On the rules front [...] FoF falls just as flat as WH did. But in a sense that is irrelevant. WH sells because it is simple, and because it is nicely figure-oriented. And In that context FoF proves an excellent supplement."

Edwin J. Rotondaro reviewed Forces of Fantasy in Space Gamer No. 73. Rotondaro commented that "Overall, this is a nice package, but you need WH to use it to its fullest. Some elements could be adapted to other systems, but at [the price] it's a risky investment."
