= Warhammer: Battle Magic =

Tabletop miniatures game supplement

Warhammer: Battle Magic is a 1992 supplement for Warhammer published by Games Workshop.

== Contents ==
Warhammer: Battle Magic is a supplement in which rules for the use of magic are included.

== Reception ==
Chris McDonough reviewed Warhammer: Battle Magic in White Wolf #36 (1993), rating it a 5 out of 5 and stated that "All in all, my biggest complaint with this supplement is that some aspect of it should have been included in the basic Warhammer game. Still, if you've already shelled out your [money] on Warhammer and were excited by what you saw there, this will make an invaluable addition to your game, perhaps even adding new life to a lackluster campaign."
