= Ravening Hordes: The Official Warhammer Battle Army Lists =

Board game supplement

Cover art by Christos Achilleos, 1987

Ravening Hordes: The Official Warhammer Battle Army Lists is a supplement published by Games Workshop in 1987 game for the second edition of the tabletop fantasy miniatures wargame Warhammer.

== Contents ==
Ravening Hordes provides a set of ten army lists, special rules and more, ensuring that both sides in a combat are roughly equivalent, and that the members of each army are thematically uniform. There are also new rules for tactical considerations such as magical weapons, equipment, manoeuvers, and unit leaders. The army lists cover:

- Orc
- Undead
- Dark elves
- Skaven
- Chaos
- Nippon
- Norse
- Empire
- Dwarfs
- Elves

There is also a chapter devoted to potential allies of each army.

== Publication history ==
Games Workshop first published Warhammer in 1983, and produced a second edition in 1984. Ravening Hordes, an 82-page softcover book by Richard Halliwell with contributions by Bryan Ansell, interior art by Tony Ackland, Dave Andrews, Nick Bibby, John Blanche, Colin Dixon, Jes Goodwin, Aly Morrison, Trish Morrison, and Christos Achilleos, and cover art by Achilleos, was published in 1987 for use with the 2nd edition.

== Reception ==
Rick Priestley reviewed Ravening Hordes: The Official Warhammer Battle Army Lists for White Dwarf #90, and stated that "Ravening Hordes is packed with information for Warhammer Battle – more than in any one source other than the rules. It's not a scenario, but a scenario construction kit."

== Reviews ==
- Jeux & Stratégie #53 (as "Hordes Sauvages")
- Magia i Miecz
- Casus Belli #46 (as "Les Hordes Sauvages")
