= Realm of Chaos: Slaves to Darkness =

RPG supplement published in 1988

Realm of Chaos: Slaves to Darkness is a 1988 supplement for Warhammer Fantasy Battle, Warhammer Fantasy Roleplay and Warhammer 40,000: Rogue Trader published by Games Workshop.

== Contents ==
Realm of Chaos: Slaves to Darkness is a supplement in which two chaos gods are covered: blood god Khorne, and pleasure lord Slaanesh.

Slaves to Darkness features extensive descriptions of the gods Khorne and Slaanesh, complete with a pantheon of their Daemons and rules for including these in tabletop battles as demonic armies.

It also features rules on the creation of Chaos Champions and their warbands, Daemon weapons, demonic possession and the Horus Heresy of WH40K. To give flavour for the background and attributes of followers of Chaos it contained material such as a list of over 120 "Chaos Attributes"—mutations that the followers of Chaos were often afflicted by. This included some mutations that were advantageous, such as those that made the mutant extra strong or taller, and those that confer a disadvantage, such as ones that made the mutant small, weak or stupid. Other mutations were purely cosmetic, such as giving the mutant brightly coloured skin or eyes on stalks, whilst some mutations were clearly comical, such as one that gave the mutant a silly walk (possibly inspired by the Monty Python sketch The Ministry of Silly Walks) and even a mutation that bestowed the "gift" of uncontrollable flatulence.

It introduced the Imperium's Daemonhunters of the Ordo Malleus and their associated Space Marine chapter—the Grey Knights.

The volume is also notable for having provided the first complete and coherent narrative of the Horus Heresy, an event which, albeit mentioned as the background justification of the internecine battles featured in the 1/300 scale boxed wargames Adeptus Titanicus and Space Marine, lacked a proper explanation in the WH40K milieu at large.

The Horus Heresy firmly locked the concept of chaos and demon influence in the SF universe of WH40K for good, establishing, as a consequence, that the "Realm of Chaos" was actually the Warpspace that intergalactic farers had to traverse in order to defeat the relativistic distances involved in space voyage.

The link between the Warhammer and Warhammer 40,000 worlds is explicitly stated in the first pages of the book.

== Publication history ==
Realm of Chaos was written by Bryan Ansell, Mike Brunton, and Simon Forrest, with Matt Connell, Graeme Davis, and Rick Priestley, with a cover by John Sibbick, and was published by Games Workshop in 1990 as a 280-page hardcover book.

Shannon Appelcline noted that "Games Workshop was putting even more focus on their new miniatures games, inherited from Citadel. The third edition of Warhammer Fantasy Battle was soon supplemented by Warhammer Armies (1988), Realm of Chaos: Slaves to Darkness (1988), and Realms of Chaos: The Lost and the Damned (1990)."

== Reception ==
Paz Newis reviewed Realm of Chaos: Slaves to Darkness for Games International magazine, and gave it 3 stars out of 5, and stated that "All in all the book will be useful if you are a player of a campaign level game of Warhammer Fantasy Battle, of moderate interest if you play Warhammer 40K, but only a completist WFRP player would need to purchase it. if you like this sort of thing, you will love this product. If not ..."

Lawrence Schick called Realm of Chaos "The biggest wallow in chaos ever published."

== Reviews ==
- Casus Belli #49
