= Warhammer Age of Sigmar =

Miniature wargame

- Manufacturers: Games Workshop
- Publishers: Games Workshop
- Years active: 2015–present
- Genres: Miniature wargaming
- Players: 2 or more
- Setup time: Varies depending on size of game, usually 15 to 30 minutes.
- Playing time: Varies depending on size of game, usually from one to four hours
- Chance: Medium (dice rolling)
- Skills: Military tactics, miniature painting
- Website: www.games-workshop.com/Warhammer-Age-of-Sigmar

Warhammer Age of Sigmar (Note: Often abbreviated as Age of Sigmar or AoS) is a miniature wargame produced by Games Workshop that simulates battles between armies by using miniature figurines. Games are typically played on a relatively flat surface such as a dining table, bespoke gaming table, or an area of floor. The playing area is often decorated with models and materials representing buildings and terrain. Players take turns taking a range of actions with their models: moving, charging, shooting ranged weapons, fighting, and casting magical spells; the outcomes of which are generally determined by dice rolls. Besides the game itself, a large part of Age of Sigmar is dedicated to the hobby of collecting, assembling and painting the miniature figurines from the game.

Whereas some wargames recreate historical warfare, Age of Sigmar has a fantasy theme heavily inspired by the fiction of J. R. R. Tolkien and Michael Moorcock. Players' armies fight with medieval-era weaponry and cast magical spells, and the warriors are a mixture of humans and fantasy creatures such as elves, dwarves, and orks.

Age of Sigmar is the sequel to the game Warhammer (specifically Warhammer Fantasy Battle). Due to this, the game contains many of the same characters, themes, and models as its predecessor. Warhammer Fantasy Battle effectively made a return with Warhammer: The Old World in 2024.

== Editions ==
The first edition of Age of Sigmar in 2015 replaced Warhammer Fantasy Battle. Another set released for the first edition was Spire of Dawn, which reused the High Elf and Skaven models from the Isle of Blood (Warhammer 8th edition starter set). The initial release of AoS did not include point values for individual units – these were added later – and instead imbalance was to be mitigated by number of models. If one side started the game with one-third more models than the other, the smaller side could choose a "sudden death" win condition for itself. (Note: Such rules included: the smaller side killing a certain model owned and nominated by the larger side.; the smaller side keeping a certain model of its own, nominated by itself, alive until the end of the sixth turn.; the smaller side having any of its models alive at the end of the fourth turn within 3" of a certain point it nominated in enemy territory.) Summoning new units used the same mechanics as spellcasting and required the dedication of reinforcement points for each summonable unit.

The initial release is notable for having included many absurd rules such as:

Pride of the Reiksguard: Helborg's skill is as legendary as his moustache is magnificent. You can re-roll any failed hit rolls when attacking with the Runefang so long as you have a bigger and more impressive moustache than your opponent.

Escapist Magazine noted that such ridiculous rules could easily be exploited since nothing in the rules said the moustache had to be real and suggested players buy novelty moustaches to satisfy the condition. Other such rules included re-rolls for players pretending to ride and talk to an imaginary horse, screaming a guttural warcry, and keeping a straight face when their opponent tries to make them laugh. Some contemporary reviews were highly critical of such rules saying that while they may have been intended as jokes to encourage roleplaying, they opened up players to ridicule.

The second edition of Age of Sigmar was released in 2018 following the Malign Portents event. It brought multiple significant changes to the rules, notably an overhaul of the summoning system, the elimination of reinforcement points, and the introduction of endless spells.

The third edition of Age of Sigmar was released in June 2021, following the Broken Realms campaign series – in which the status quo of the setting was drastically altered. The new edition featured an overhaul of the Battalion system, objectives, and the introduction of a new Path to Glory narrative campaign.

The fourth edition of Age of Sigmar was released in July 2024, following the Dawnbringer Crusade campaign. Taking place in Aqshy (the Realm of Fire), this edition sees the retirement of the Beastmen and Bonesplitterz factions.

== Setting ==
Age of Sigmar is set in a universe known as the Mortal Realms, a collection of diverse realms each characterised by the eight winds of magic. The Mortal Realms were formed from the remnants of the "World That Was", which was destroyed during the End Times of the Warhammer Fantasy universe. The realms are interconnected by magical portals known as Realmgates, allowing for travel and conflict between them.

Realms:

- Azyr: The Realm of Heaven, ruled by Sigmar, is characterised by its bright skies and celestial bodies. It is home to the Stormcast Eternals, elite warriors forged from the souls of the worthy to combat chaos.
- Ghur: Known as the Realm of Beasts, Ghur is a wild and untamed land filled with primal beasts and savage tribes. Its landscapes range from dense jungles to vast plains, inhabited by feral tribes and monstrous creatures.
- Aqshy: The Realm of Fire, dominated by volcanic landscapes and raging flames, is inhabited by factions that harness the destructive power of fire, including the Fyreslayers, a dwarf faction known for their fiery tempers and relentless pursuit of Ur-gold.
- Ghyran: The Realm of Life is characterised by lush landscapes, vibrant flora, and the forces of nature. It is a place of regeneration and vitality, where the Sylvaneth protect the natural world from corruption.
- Shyish: The Realm of Death is ruled by Nagash, the god of death. It is a land of eternal twilight, filled with tombs, spectral entities, and the undead, where Nagash's followers seek to expand his influence over the living.
- Ulgu: Known as the Realm of Shadow, Ulgu is a place of darkness and illusion. The landscape is filled with twisted forests and shadowy terrains, where light struggles to penetrate. Its inhabitants often utilise deception and cunning tactics.
- Hysh: The Realm of Light is characterised by enlightenment, wisdom, and knowledge. Its radiant landscapes are filled with brilliant colours and vibrant flora, where the Lumineth Realm-lords strive to preserve balance and promote order.
- Chamon: The Realm of Metal is defined by its mineral wealth and magical properties. It is home to various factions that manipulate metal and earth magic, characterised by stunning landscapes filled with gleaming ores and intricate machinery.

== Gameplay ==
Age of Sigmar emphasises the narrative aspect of the wargaming experience, encouraging the play of story-driven scenarios, recreation of battles from lore, and player-created stories. The ruleset is designed to make the game easy to learn but hard to master. Basic rules of play are simple and quick to understand, but more advanced mechanics can be found in unit-specific "Warscrolls" that detail more rules and stats of the individual unit. The art of the game lies in understanding how your units work together and exploiting synergies to use them as a cohesive army. The rules and Warscrolls are free, and can be downloaded from the Games Workshop website or viewed in the Age of Sigmar app.

== Factions ==
Each faction in Age of Sigmar is a part of one of four super-factions, called Grand Alliances. In the lore, factions within a Grand Alliance are generally united by common goals and aims. Conflict still occurs within Grand Alliances, however, as each faction will often have its own agenda that clashes with the agenda of other factions.

In early periods of Age of Sigmar – specifically First Edition – armies could be built from multiple factions within the same Alliance (e.g. Stormcast Eternals, Seraphon, and Sylvaneth), with an allegiance corresponding to that particular Grand Alliance but not to any of the individual factions. In more recent editions, armies are built mostly from individual factions (e.g. a Stormcast Eternals army) with an option to include a limited number of allies from related factions within the alliance (e.g. a Stormcast Eternals army with 200 points of Seraphon allies). An army consisting of Factions usually synergise best with their own units, and faction-specific armies receive bonuses and additional rules that are not available to mixed Grand Alliance armies.

Grand alliance

Chaos The Grand Alliance of Chaos is made up of factions that embrace the corrupting influence of the Chaos Gods. These factions revel in destruction, bloodshed, and the pursuit of power, often vying for dominance over one another.

- Blades of Khorne: The followers of Khorne, the Blood God, revel in battle and bloodshed, seeking to spill blood in his name. Their forces include fierce warriors and bloodthirsty demons.
- Disciples of Tzeentch: Servants of Tzeentch, the Changer of Ways, they wield powerful magic and engage in complex schemes and deceptions, with units like Horrors and Tzeentchian Sorcerers.
- Hedonites of Slaanesh: Worshippers of Slaanesh, the Dark Prince of Excess, embodying indulgence and pleasure. Their armies feature alluring units that seduce and deceive.
- Maggotkin of Nurgle: Followers of Nurgle, the Plague God, thrive in decay and disease. They are characterised by resilient, grotesque warriors who spread rot and despair.
- Slaves to Darkness: Mortals who have pledged themselves to the Chaos Gods, forming the backbone of many Chaos armies. They include a variety of warriors, champions, and monstrous allies.
- Skaven: A race of malevolent, rat-like humanoids that worship the Horned Rat. Known for their treachery, they employ cunning tactics and overwhelming numbers.
- Helsmiths of Hashut: A spurned race of dwarves twisted by the betrayal of the dwarven gods. Led by, Hashut: The Father of Darkness.

Death This Grand Alliance encompasses the forces of the undead and other beings that thrive in death. The factions within Death seek to expand their influence over the living and manipulate the cycles of life and death. They serve the will of Nagash, the god of death.

- Flesh-Eater Courts: A sinister faction of undead ghouls who believe they are noble knights and ladies, perpetually seeking to satisfy their insatiable hunger for flesh. led by Ushoran, the Mortarch of Delusion.
- Nighthaunt: Ghostly spirits bound to serve Nagash, the god of death. They are known for their stealth and terror, using ethereal abilities to haunt their enemies. Led by Lady Olynder, the Mortarch of Grief.
- Ossiarch Bonereapers: Constructed from the bones of the dead, they serve Nagash as disciplined warriors, bringing order to the chaos of death. Led by Orpheon Katakros, the Mortarch of the Necropolis, and Arkhan the Black, the Mortarch of Sacrament.
- Soulblight Gravelords: Undead lords and their vampire minions who seek to dominate the living and control the realm of Shyish. Led by Neferata, the Mortarch of Blood, and Mannfred von Carstein, the Mortarch of Night.

Destruction The Grand Alliance of Destruction consists of factions that embrace savagery and anarchy, often prioritising violence and mayhem. The forces of Destruction are characterised by their primal instincts and their desire to reclaim the realms through brute force and unrelenting aggression. In one way or another they all worship Gorkamorka, the twin-headed god of destruction and savagery

- Gloomspite Gitz: Grots (similar to fantasy goblins) who worship the Bad Moon, known for their cunning and trickery, utilising ambush tactics and overwhelming numbers.
- Ogor Mawtribes: Massive, hulking ogors that roam the realms, driven by their insatiable hunger. They form tribes that raid and devour anything in their path.
- Orruk Warclans: This faction includes Orruk tribes:
  - Ironjawz: Brutal warriors clad in heavy armour, known for their overwhelming force and direct combat style.
  - Kruleboyz: Cunning and tactical, they utilise guerrilla warfare and ambush tactics to outsmart their foes.
- Sons of Behemat: Colossal gargants that bring destruction wherever they tread, often viewed as forces of nature.

Order This Grand Alliance comprises factions dedicated to maintaining peace, stability, and civilisation in the Mortal Realms. The forces of Order strive to counteract the chaos and destruction wrought by their enemies.

- Cities of Sigmar: civilised realms that unite various factions to defend against chaos, featuring a diverse array of troops and heroes.
- Daughters of Khaine: Fierce, bloodthirsty aelf warriors who serve the goddess Khaine, known for their speed and deadly combat abilities.
- Khazalite Holds: Hardy Duardin warriors gathering to retake their ancient empire and avenge former grudges.
- Idoneth Deepkin: Aelf sea-folk who have a unique connection to the oceans, employing swift tactics and ambushes in battle.
- Kharadron Overlords: A faction of sky-dwelling Duardins who utilise advanced technology and airships to engage in warfare.
- Lumineth Realm-lords: Aelf warriors who embody the ideals of order and enlightenment, utilising powerful magic and disciplined tactics.
- Seraphon: Ancient guardians created by the Old Ones, characterised by their lizard-like forms and mastery of primal magic.
- Stormcast Eternals: Divine warriors resurrected by Sigmar to combat chaos, clad in enchanted armour and wielding powerful weapons.
- Sylvaneth: Spirits of nature that protect the forests and balance of life, embodying the primal forces of the natural world.

Factions removed in 4th edition:

- Bonesplitterz: A savage tribe of Orruks who wield bone weapons and tap into the power of the WAAAGH! to enhance their ferocity in battle, often engaging in rituals to honour their ancestors.
- Beasts of Chaos: A faction of corrupted creatures and humanoid beasts that worship the Dark Gods, embodying the primal forces of nature and chaos, and employing ambush tactics to reclaim territory from civilisation.
- Fyreslayers: Duardin Warriors driven by their obsession with gold and honor, known for thir powerful runic magic and combat skills. The Fyreslayers were removed as their own independent faction and merged with the Khazalite Holds in late 2026.

== Boxed sets ==
=== Starter Sets ===
- Warhammer: Age of Sigmar Starter Set: An army of the Stormcast Eternals Warrior Chamber against the Khorne Bloodbound.
- Soul Wars: The Stormcast Eternals of the Sacrosanct Chamber against the Nighthaunt.
- Dominion: The Thunderstrike Stormcast Eternals against the Kruleboyz Orruks.
- Skaventide: Age of Sigmar 4th Edition starter set, pitting the Stormcast Eternals against the Skaven.

=== Stand-Alone Battleboxes ===
- Blightwar: features the Maggotkin of Nurgle against the Stormcast Eternals
- Wrath and Rapture: features the Blades of Khorne against the Hedonites of Slaanesh
- Carrion Empire: features the Flesh-Eater Courts against the Skaven
- Looncurse: features the Gloomspite Gitz against the Sylvaneth
- Feast of Bones: features the Ogor Mawtribes against the Ossiarch Bonereapers
- Aether War: features the Disciples of Tzeentch against the Kharadron Overlords
- Shadow and Pain: features the Daughters of Khaine against the Hedonites of Slaanesh
- Echoes of Doom: features the Skaven against the Sylvaneth
- Arcane Cataclysm: features the Disciples of Tzeentch against the Lumineth Realm-Lords

== Reception ==
=== Criticism ===
Warhammer Age of Sigmar was widely criticised by the fanbase upon release for replacing the setting and gameplay of its predecessor, Warhammer Fantasy Battle. With the advent of the game's Second Edition, reception towards the game has improved, with Tom Senior in PC Gamer in 2018 saying "it still can't match the history and dense charactisation of the armies of the old world, but that takes time, and the game is on a good trajectory" under a headline "Age of Sigmar second edition brings Warhammer close to its former glory".

== Video games ==
Age of Sigmar video games include Storm Ground in 2021 and Realms of Ruin in 2023.
