= Warhammer Fantasy (setting) =

High-fantasy setting, created by Games Workshop

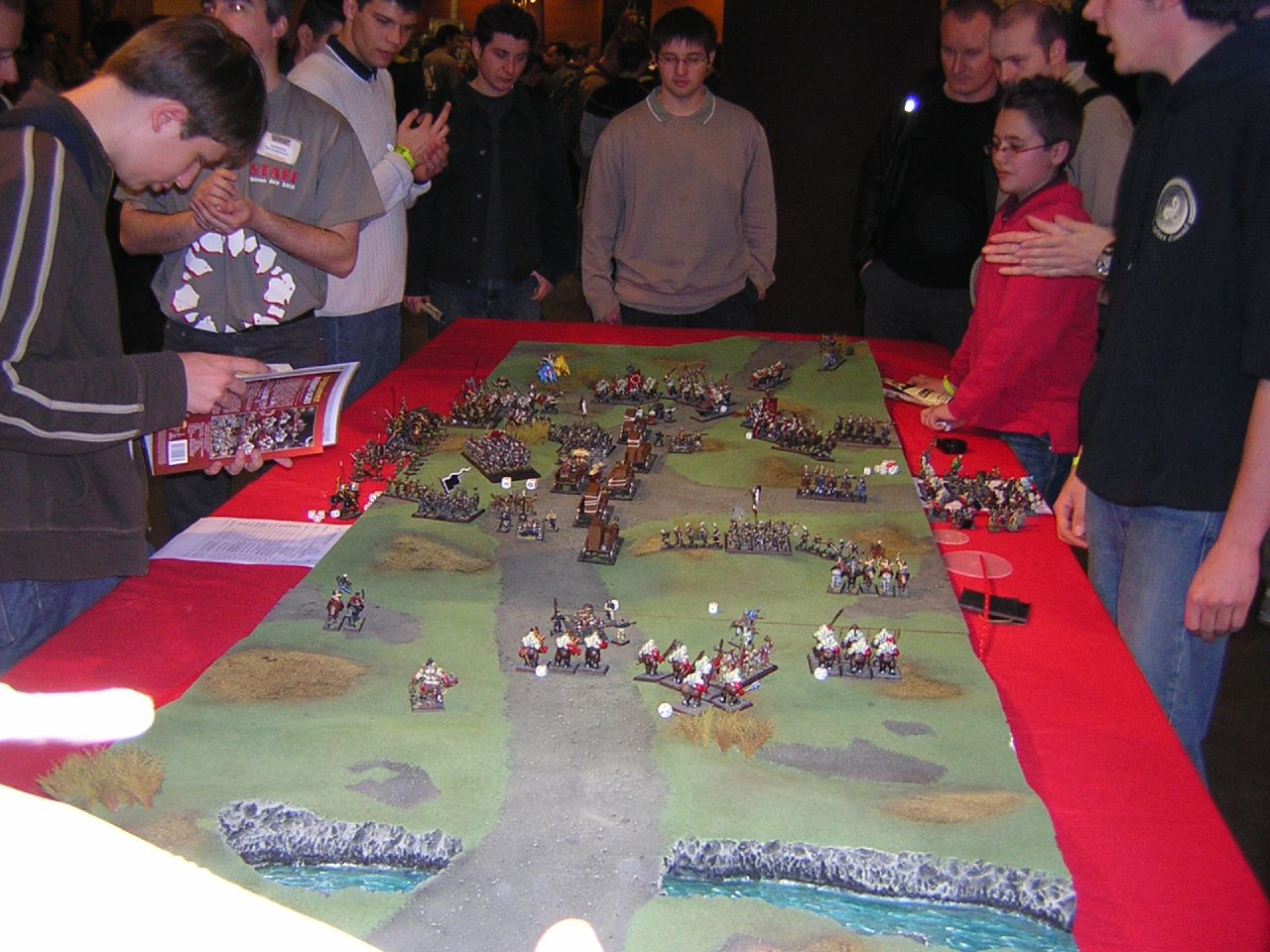
A crowd gathered around a Warhammer set-up

Warhammer Fantasy (later renamed Warhammer: The Old World) is a fictional fantasy universe created by Games Workshop and used in many of its games, including the table top wargame Warhammer (originally Warhammer Fantasy Battle), the Warhammer Fantasy Roleplay (WFRP) pen-and-paper role-playing game, and a number of video games: the MMORPG Warhammer Online: Age of Reckoning, the strategy games Total War: Warhammer, Total War: Warhammer II, Total War: Warhammer III, and the two first-person shooter games in the Warhammer Vermintide series, Warhammer: End Times – Vermintide and Warhammer: Vermintide 2, among many others.

Warhammer is notable for its “grim-dark” background world, which references a range of historical cultures such as the Holy Roman Empire, Mesoamerica, ancient Egypt, and medieval France, and is populated with a variety of races such as humans, high elves, dark elves, wood elves, dwarfs, undead, orcs, lizardmen, and other creatures familiar to many fantasy/role-playing settings.

The development of the setting began with the release of a game simply called “Warhammer” in 1983. In 2014, Games Workshop introduced The End Times, a setting-wide event that culminated in the destruction of the Warhammer world. The setting is followed by a soft reboot known as Warhammer Age of Sigmar, created in 2015. In 2024, Warhammer Fantasy was brought back in a reboot known as Warhammer The Old World, which brings a new version of the old rules and updated models.

== Background ==
The Warhammer world drew inspiration from Tolkien’s Middle-earth, but also from Robert E. Howard (Conan the Barbarian) and Michael Moorcock (Elric of Melniboné), as well as real-world history, particularly European history. What is recognisable as the Warhammer World began with the expansion material to the first edition of the game Warhammer, but was formulated as a distinct setting with a world map in the second edition.

The Warhammer World borrowed considerably from historical events and other fantasy fiction settings. The Old World is recognisably Europe approximating to various historical periods including the Renaissance—the Empire being set over what was the Holy Roman Empire—medieval France, Roman Italy and Celtic Britain. Many events are lifted and modified directly from history, including the Black Plague and the Moorish invasion of Spain, and others from original fantasy sources. Like Middle-earth, Warhammer's Dwarfs are declining in population, the Elves have mostly departed for homelands in the West, and a Great Necromancer is reborn after the defeats in his Southern stronghold.

== Races and nations ==
The world of Warhammer Fantasy has some of the largest distribution of races and cultures in pop fantasy.

=== Mankind ===
One of the world's most prominent, and often one of the most susceptible to the corrupting influence of Chaos. Most of the featured human nations are based in the Old World (analogous to real Europe): The Empire (Holy Roman Empire), Bretonnia (France and Arthurian Britain), Tilea and Dogs of War (Renaissance Italy and Condotierri) and Kislev (Slavs of Russia, Poland, and Ukraine). Further east of them is another powerful human civilisation known as Grand Cathay (corresponding to China). There is also Nippon (Japan), Ind (India) and Araby (based loosely on the various Middle Eastern powers that ruled throughout the Middle Ages and Renaissance, most notably the Ottoman Empire).

=== Old Ones ===
Many factions, such as the Elves, the Lizardmen, the Ogres and the Halflings, have been created by the Old Ones: star-travelling gods responsible for the creation of most of the setting's sentient races. These Old Ones were brought low by the daemonic forces inadvertently unleashed by the collapse of their Warp Gates (one on the North Pole and one on the South Pole), leaving their creations to fend for themselves. This backstory also provides an easy explanation for the presence of a variety of familiar fantasy races. Ogres and Halflings, for example, are closely related. Both are resistant to the mutating effects of Chaos energies (fuelled by hearty appetites and efficient metabolisms), but have opposite physical templates.

=== Elves ===
The Elves were the first civilised race to walk the Warhammer world. Brought into creation by the Old Ones, the Elves showed a natural talent for magic and superlative martial skills. The once thriving civilisation of the Elves was torn asunder many thousands of years ago by a bitter civil war, resulting in the sundering of the race into three distinct kindreds: the cruel, twisted, slave-trading Dark Elves, the proud, noble and magical High Elves who continue the ancient traditions from before the sundering, and a third group as the rustic, sylvan and mysterious Wood Elves. The High Elves inhabit the magical island of Ulthuan (analogous to Atlantis), while the Dark Elves inhabit the continent of Naggaroth (correspondent to North America in the real world), a desolate icy wilderness and the Wood Elves live in the forests of Athel Loren in the Old World.

=== Chaos ===
Many races have fallen to, or been corrupted by Chaos. The barbaric Warriors of Chaos (formerly called "Hordes of Chaos") invade the civilised nations from the far northern Chaos Wastes. Beastmen, the human-animal hybrid products of Chaos, are found in the dark forests of the entire Warhammer world.

The Chaos forces are the personified flaws of sapient beings; the inner daemons of living things come back through a magic medium as literal daemons to torment and kill. The ultimate victory of these forces is often hinted at, highlighting a strong assumption that sentient beings are fundamentally flawed and will eventually bring about their own destruction via the forces of Chaos. The possibility of the victory of Chaos is a major theme in the End Times campaign.

=== Dwarfs ===
Dwarfs are an ancient, gritty, and determined race integral in the founding of the Empire. A large amount of the Empire's industry and mechanisms were provided by the Dwarfs. Dwarfs are the greatest craftsmen in the Warhammer World, a skill largely matched by the Chaos Dwarfs who split from their brothers after being corrupted by Chaos.

Their language is called Khazalid, written using a runic-like script called Klinkarhun.

=== Lizardmen ===
In the jungles of the Lustria continent (Central and South America) are the Lizardmen who were created by the Old Ones to aid in their great works. The Slann, who act as leaders and priests, now lead the Lizardmen blindly, via ancient prophecies containing almost incomprehensible instructions left by the Old Ones. They rise from spawning pools, each of the subspecies made to perform certain tasks. The Skinks are craftsmen, spellcasters, or scouts. The Saurus are the warriors, and Kroxigors serve as builders as well as heavy troops. The culture and aesthetic of the Lizardmen are heavily inspired by those of the Aztec and Mayan cultures.

=== Orcs, Goblins ===
Orcs, Goblins, and their kin (also known as Greenskins), are relatively primitive and disorganised, but their instinctive belligerence threatens the various nations. Their violent nature commonly causes wars against not only the neighbouring peoples, but also their own kind. They are found predominantly in the forests and mountains of the Old World, as well in the jungles to the south and stretched across the steppes to the East, but their kin can be found all over the world, inhabiting almost all continents and adapting to their environments. Thus there are many sub-species of Orcs and Goblins such as Black Orcs and Night Goblins. They are described in the supplemental book Orcs and Goblins, first published in 1993. The phrase “orcs & goblins” also refers collectively to all of the races that are described in this book, which includes other “greenskins” as well. The book includes background information, illustrations, and game rules for these races. The Orcs and Goblins represent a generic Dark Ages warband army with little internal cohesion and discipline, and relying on the ferocious charge and individual fighting skills rather than organised generalship. In issue 203 of Dragon #203 (March 1994), Bob Bigelow liked the fact that the details were told through stories that “details animosity levels between orc and goblin and the importance of shamans.” He also noted that “The armies list is split between the different types of orcs and goblins, as well as monsters’ allies.” Bigelow concluded that the book has “excellent line drawings and action illustrations as well as [its] practical game value [...] well worth the price to anyone who wishes to campaign.”

=== Skaven ===
Living underneath much of the known world are the Skaven, diabolical ratmen living in a subterranean dog-eat-dog Machiavellian society, called the “Under-empire.” They are divided into clans such as Clan Eshin, master assassins, Clan Skryre, master engineers, Clan Moulder, masters of body melding, and Clan Mors, masters of infantry and war tactics. It is believed that they are so numerous that if they worked together they would be able to destroy the surface world, however their innate predilection for cowardice and betrayal makes long term cooperation unlikely.

=== Undead ===
Besides these, there are the Undead, who are a result of the black sorceries of the first necromancer, Nagash, in the long distant past. His legacy has left the Tomb Kings, who are the resurrected armies of the first human civilisation, in the hot desert lands of Nehekhara to the south of the Old World (based on Ancient Egypt with some inspiration from mummies in fiction), the Vampire Counts in the Old World (based upon Dracula which is set in Transylvania), the zombie pirates of Luthor Harkon's Vampire Coast found on the eastern coast of Lustria (based on stereotypical pirates of the 18th century), and Nagash in his own city of undead. Prior to Games Workshop retconning the backstory, there was previously a unified Undead Army.

== Fiction ==
Outside of games, there have been novels, novellas and short stories by various authors set in the Warhammer world, the most famous of which are the novels featuring Gotrek and Felix by William King. The Gotrek and Felix series was taken over by Nathan Long, starting with Orcslayer in 2006.

Warhammer Fantasy author Stephen Baxter has stated that according to Marc Gascoigne the idea of Chaos in Warhammer was inspired by The Eternal Champion and its sequels, written by Michael Moorcock, who made use of ideas from Three Hearts and Three Lions by Poul Anderson. The Warhammer elves were inspired by The Broken Sword by Poul Anderson as well the Middle-earth canon of J. R. R. Tolkien.

Early in his career, Kim Newman wrote Warhammer novels under the pen name Jack Yeovil. Some elements from these books (in particular his heroine Genevieve Dieudonné) later reappeared in the award-winning Anno Dracula series.

Early novels were published as “GW Books” by Boxtree Ltd, but more recently novels have been under Games Workshop's publishing arm, the Black Library. Warhammer Monthly was a comic book, published by Black Library, which ran for over 5 years and included strips set in the other areas of the Warhammer Universe. Generally running concurrently with Warhammer Monthly was Inferno! – also published by Black Library – a magazine which compiled short stories and occasional unconnected illustrations set in the fictional backgrounds of Games Workshop.

Games Workshop licensed out the rights for comic books. Boom! Studios have been working on a series of Warhammer and Warhammer 40,000 comics, written by Dan Abnett and Ian Edginton. The first was the Warhammer 40k strip Damnation Crusade, but this was followed by one in the fantasy universe Forge of War. When this was finished, they started a new series located in the Warhammer Fantasy universe, called Warhammer – Condemned by Fire. This series features a witch-hunter fighting the Chaos minions in the remote regions of the Empire.

== Locations ==
=== Realm of Chaos ===
The Realm of Chaos (also called the Warp, the Aethyr, the Empyrean, the Realm of Souls or the Immaterium) is an alternate dimension which is found in several of Games Workshop's fictional universes, including Warhammer Fantasy. It is separate to the physical world of Warhammer, and draws inspiration from depictions of hell, the underworld and cosmic horror. The normal laws of physics and linear time/causality do not apply in the Realm of Chaos, and it is said that mortals who enter or even glimpse it tend to go insane.

The Realm itself is composed of raw magical energy generated by the emotions and thoughts of sapient creatures such as humans. Thus, the Realm of Chaos is the source of magic in the Warhammer World, and this is why magic is such an unwieldy, dangerous and often mutating force. The Realm is inhabited by malevolent daemonic creatures made of magic, the souls of mortal creatures, and most notably the four evil Chaos Gods. These four “Ruinous Powers” exert a corrupting influence upon mortals in the physical world. Their ultimate goal is to expand the Realm of Chaos, engulfing and destroying the physical world entirely.

=== Chaos Wastes ===
In contrast to the Realm of Chaos, the Chaos Wastes (also known as the Umbra Chaotica) are a part of the physical world. They are a vast, warped, cold and barren wasteland surrounding the northern polar region (and probably also the southern polar region) of the world. The Wastes border Grand Cathay, the Eastern Steppes, the Ogre Kingdoms, Norsca and Naggaroth. Norsca and the Eastern Steppes are sometimes considered to be part of the Wastes. At the north pole, there is a great collapsed Chaos Portal which allows travel between the physical world and the Realm of Chaos. This Portal spews dangerous, raw magical energy into the physical world, causing mutations to any person or creature in the north, and even to the land, climate and flow of time.

The Chaos Wastes are inhabited by various mutated flora and fauna, Daemons, Chaos monsters (including Beastmen), Greenskins and the barbaric human tribes of the Norse, Kurgan, Hung and Tong. These Warriors of Chaos worship the evil Chaos Gods whose influence is strong in the Wastes. In order to guard against incursions from the north, Grand Cathay has constructed a Great Bastion (similar to the real-world Great Wall of China), while the Dark Elves of Naggaroth have constructed a series of Watchtower fortresses.

=== The Old World ===
The Old World is a northerly region, roughly an analogue to Europe. It is a broadly temperate area dominated by several large human countries as well as smaller states controlled by Dwarfs and Wood Elves. There are also some areas controlled by Undead lords, or marauding Beastmen, Orcs, or Goblins.

==== The Empire ====
The Empire of Man, known to most as the Empire, is the largest and oldest human civilisation in the Old World. It is culturally, technologically, and geographically based on early modern Germany, with its name being an allusion to the historical Holy Roman Empire. To the east lie the World's Edge Mountains, to the west Bretonnia, to the south the Border Princes/Badlands and to the north is Kislev and the sea. The main cities (which mostly lie in the south) are Altdorf (the current capital), Middenheim, Nuln, Talabheim and Averheim.

The Empire was originally founded thousands of years ago, when the Warrior-King Sigmar Heldenhammer (a Conan the Barbarian and Charlemagne-type figure) united several bronze-age tribes, and allied with the Dwarfs, to face the greater threats of Orcs and Goblins, Undead and Chaos. Sigmar has since become the primary god worshipped in the Empire, representing justice and strength, although there are also other important ones such as Ulric (god of wolves, winter and battle), Shallya (goddess of mercy and healing), Rhya (goddess of harvest and family) and Morr (god of death and the afterlife).

The Empire is a large, diverse country based around several large rivers: the Reik, Talabec, Stir and Aver. The various Provinces are each ruled by an Elector Count or equivalent, who elect an Emperor to rule for life. Despite this, the provinces have a great deal of autonomy to govern and defend themselves, and there has been centuries-long periods of civil war and contending-Emperors/Empresses. The centre and north of the country is dominated by huge forests, which often house bandits, Chaos cultists, Orcs/Goblins or Beastmen who prey on isolated settlements. The south of the country has a warmer climate and is dominated by grassland and extensive fields. Despite the great differences between the provinces, the people of the Empire are kept united by their “steel, gunpowder, and faith in Sigmar” as well as a common language: Reikspiel.

- Marienburg: in the west of the Empire, at the mouth of the River Reik, lies the free city-state of Marienburg, the largest and wealthiest city in the Old World. It is dominated by merchants and based on early modern Amsterdam. Marienburg is culturally linked to the Empire but politically entirely independent, having bribed a past Emperor in order to secede.
- Sylvania is a region of the Empire developed in the setting as a home to vampires, ghouls and other undead creatures, inspired by real-world Transylvania, as well as Hungary. It is a cursed land plagued by the restless dead and suffers from warpstone meteorite falls. Sylvania was once ruled openly by the Vampire Counts, the Von Carsteins, who raised undead armies to invade the rest of the country in a series of devastating wars. Today it is nominally ruled by human nobles but secretly ruled by vampire aristocrats. Treaties between the vampires and human nobles have created an uneasy peace. It is considered a backwater and generally shunned by the rest of the Empire.
- The Moot is a semi-autonomous area in the Empire, granted to the Halflings. It bears similarities to the Shire from Tolkien's Middle-Earth.

==== Bretonnia ====
Bretonnia lies west of the Empire, across the Grey Mountains, and north of Estalia. Bretonnia is a temperate land with a mild climate and fertile soils, inspired by Medieval France and legends of King Arthur. In the centre of the country lie the Forest of Arden and Massif Orcal, two wild regions inhabited by Beastmen and Orcs/Goblins, respectively. Dominated by feudal dukedoms and ruled by a King, Bretonnia has a stark class divide between the wealthy knightly nobility, and the peasants who live in poverty and squalor, with very low class mobility. The nobility are supposed to follow a code of chivalry, and a small number eventually complete religious pilgrimage, becoming virtuous Grail Knights. However the majority of the upper classes are fiercely oppressive towards the peasants.

The main god of the nobility is the Lady of the Lake, although the peasant classes worship the polytheistic gods of the rest of the Old World, particularly Rhya. Bretonnia nominally includes the forest of Loren, although in reality most Bretonnians fear and avoid the Woodland Realm, and have many superstitions about it.

- Athel Loren is an enchanted forest in the southeast of Bretonnia. In a similar manner to the Chaos Wastes, the flow of time may distort and warp in the forest. Different sections may experience different times of day, or different seasons. A person may spend a day in the forest and emerge to find that only minutes have passed, or conversely that 100 years have gone by. Though nominally part of Bretonnia, the forest is actually ruled by the reclusive Wood Elves (descendants of breakaway High Elf colonists), who are in an uneasy alliance with ancient, xenophobic Forest Spirits such as Dryads and Treemen (similar to the Ents of Tolkien). At the forest's centre lies the enormous Oak of Ages, drawing influence from various world tree myths.

==== Kislev ====
Kislev is a cold land, north of the Empire but south of Norsca. It is primarily based on Russia, with some references to other Eastern European and Slavic nations, such as the unit called 'Winged Lancer' – a reference to the Polish winged hussar, as well as the prominent fortified city of Praag - its namesake being that of the real-world capital of the Czech Republic. Much of Kislev is cold steppe, although there is an extensive taiga forest in the east. To the northwest, there is an ill-defined border between Kislev and Troll Country, a marshy, frigid wilderness infested with monsters. Historically, Kislev has been inhabited by a succession of human ethnic groups: first the Roppsmenn, then the Ungols and most recently the Gospodars who have united the region.

The state is ruled by Tzars (female title: Tzarina) and the current ruler is Tzarina Katarin, the “Ice Queen.” Tzars rule over Boyars (the middle nobility) and the Druzhina (the lowest nobility, mostly composed of ethnic Gospodars). There's also the Chekist, the secret police and the analogue of the Empire's Inquisition that's used by the Tzars against heritics and political enemies alike. Kislev's military is primarily composed of rotas of the Streltsi (firearm-welding infantry, hence the name) and the Winged Lancers – also known as “the Riders of the Dead,” for “they are mourned as if already deceased.”

The country's recently established official religion is the Great Orthodoxy. The country's most important god is Ursun, the bear-god of winter and strength, and the Kislevites seem to have a special affinity with bears. Other important gods include Dazh (god of fire, the sun, summer, family and hospitality) and Tor (god of storms). The main cities of Kislev are the eponymous Kislev, Erengrad and Praag The Cursed, which rule over the vast Oblasts surrounding them.

Kislev is a northern realm exposed to incursions from the Chaos wastes. Its climate and terrain—including severe winters and poor farmland—shape life across the country. Kislev maintains longstanding ties with the Empire and the Dwarfs, with opposition to Chaos forming one part of those relationships.

==== Other ====
- Estalia is the Warhammer equivalent of the Iberian Peninsula, located on a peninsula to the south-west of Bretonnia bordered by the Irrana and Abasko Mountains to the east, the Great Western Ocean to the north and west and the Southern Sea to the south. Far from hostile factions, Estalia is politically fractured, rival kingdoms (notably Bilbali and Magritta) vie against each other and neighbouring Tilea. Estalia bore the brunt of Sultan Jaffar's invasion from Araby, which was eventually driven out by a combined force of Bretonnian Knights and Tilean Legionnaires. Estalians take great offense at being referred to as Tileans, or at being addressed in the Tilean language by accident. The peninsula is renowned for its Diestros, skilled duelists who ply their skills across the Old World. Like the Tileans, the Estalians’ revere Myrmidia as their highest goddess.
- Tilea is on a peninsula on the southern coast of the Old World, equivalent to Renaissance Italy with some Roman influences. To the north and east lies the high mountains of The Vaults, and to the south and west lies the sea. Due to this geographic protection, Tilea never had to unite, and has become dominated by rival city-states with a great wealth in trade. The most important gods in Tilea are Myrmidia, goddess of soldiers, justice, and wisdom and Mannann, god of the sea. Tilean mercenaries and traders can be found across the old world, and are famed for their skills in battle and haggling. Tilean explorers have also been at the forefront of contact with the New World and the Far East.
- Albion is an island in the great ocean northwest of the Empire, southwest of Norsca. Based on Britain and Ireland, inhabited by people similar to pre-Roman Gaelic and Celtic Briton tribes. Not much information has been published about it, although it was the setting for Dark Shadows, an early-2000s event held by Games Workshop.
- The Border Prince Confederacy is a collection of petty Human kingdoms, bandits, mercenaries, pirates and other fugitives. It is analogous to the Balkans.

=== Dark Lands ===
The Dark Lands lie east of the Old World and west of the Far East, between the World's Edge Mountains and Mountains of Mourn. It lacks any real-world equivalent, but is similar to Mordor of Tolkien’s Middle-earth, with a dry climate and many volcanoes.

In the northern Dark Lands is the empire of the Chaos Dwarfs. They are the most powerful faction in the region, and mesh industrialisation and Mesopotamian influences. Outside of this area, the Dark Lands are mostly dominated by barbaric Orcs and Goblin tribes. The River Ruin is the only major River in the Dark Lands, and it is heavily polluted by Chaos Dwarf industry.

To the southwest is the Plain of Bones where the remains of many dead dragons can be found. This area draws practitioners of necromancy and the Undead. To the southeast are the Dragon Isles which are often cited as a desirable, if dangerous, location for voyages in search of riches to aim for. On its southern coastline in the river delta region lies the frontier human settlement Pigbarter.

=== Ogre Kingdoms ===
East of the Dark Lands lie the Mountains of Mourn and Ancient Giant Lands, extremely high mountains with a cold climate, which resemble the Himalayas of the real world. This region is inhabited by fierce monsters resembling pleistocene megafauna. The brutish, semi-nomadic Ogre Kingdoms dominate here. They are primarily based on the nomadic Mongol Empire, as well as on cavemen tropes. The Ogres also have a race of slave Gnoblars (relatives of Goblins), and are said to be always hungry, valuing food as much as gold.

=== Far East ===
This area of the Warhammer World is equivalent to East/Southeast Asia. It is not greatly developed in the published games or fiction, but there are human civilizations there, specifically Ind, Grand Cathay, and Nippon (which are equivalents of India, China and Japan respectively). To the south lies the Hinterlands of Khuresh (which is inhabited by Nāgas) and Lost Isles of Ethlis, equivalent to Southeast Asia.

Grand Cathay is the largest human empire in Warhammer Fantasy, ruled by the Celestial Dragon Emperor and Moon Empress, who are immortal dragons able to shapeshift into human form. They delegate most governing of Cathay to five of their children, who are also immortal shapeshifting dragons and each rule a different region of the empire. Grand Cathay have long ago constructed an enormous fortification called the Great Bastion on their northern border, to guard against incursions from Hobgoblins and the forces of Chaos who dwell on the Eastern Steppes. There is some trade with the human nations of the Old World (via the “Ivory Road”) and the High Elves (via the sea), as well as coastal raids by the Dark Elves. But overall, contact between the east and west is quite limited, and Grand Cathay is fairly isolationist.

For the videogame Total War: Warhammer III, Games Workshop has worked together with British developer Creative Assembly to create background information for Grand Cathay, so that the faction may be included in the game.

=== The Underground ===
Various tunnels, caverns and entire cities, lie beneath the Old World, World's Edge Mountains and the rest of the world. Most cities of the Dwarfs are underground, and many Orc/Goblin settlements are as well (the Night Goblins are especially known for being cave-dwellers and rarely come to the surface during daylight).

In ages past, the Dwarfs built the Underway, a great system of highways, mines and settlements which stretched huge distances between their great underground fortress-cities. Today, much of the underway is in ruins and highly dangerous. Many former Dwarf cities and Underway sections are now occupied by Night Goblins and Skaven (a race of evil, intelligent anthropomorphic rats, about the size of a human). The Dwarfs, Skaven and Orcs/Goblins are locked in a constant three-way war for control of the underground.

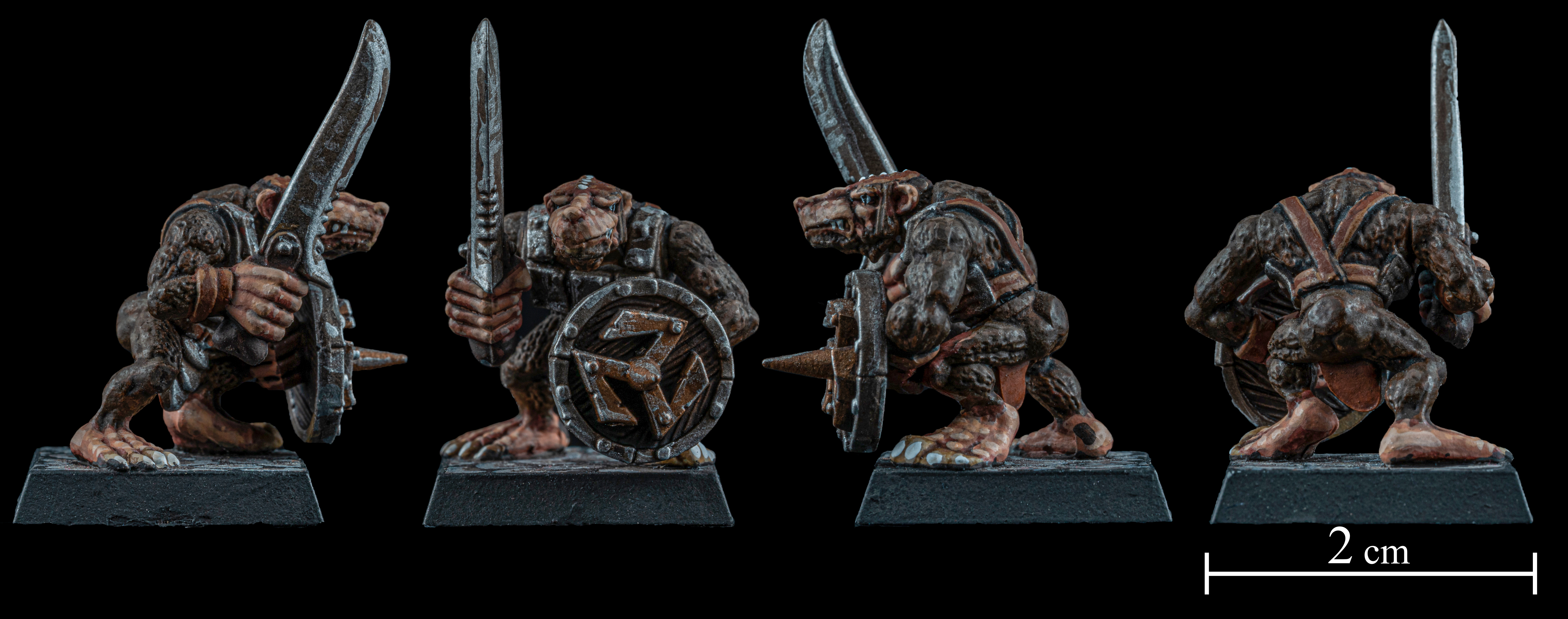
A skaven clanrat miniature

The Skaven Under-Empire is a huge subterranean realm, comprising many repurposed Dwarf areas, as well as many Skaven-dug tunnels and settlements called “Under-Cities” beneath most human and Dwarf cities. Their capital and greatest city is Skavenblight, which lies in remote marshland between Estalia and Tilea. It is here that the secretive “Council of Thirteen” collectively rule the Under-Empire. The Skaven are perhaps the most numerous race in the Warhammer world, and often use mass numbers to overwhelm enemies, rising suddenly and unexpectedly from underground. They care little for casualties, and lack empathy for others even of their own kind, so their arcane war machines and mutant monsters often kill as many Skaven soldiers as enemies. Skaven worship only one god, the Great Horned Rat, with the Grey Seers (pale-furred, horned Skaven) serving as a caste of priests and spellcasters. Clan Pestilens are a breakaway sect who worship the Horned Rat in his aspect as a bringer of plagues and diseases.

=== Ulthuan ===
Ulthuan is a ring-shaped island continent, controlled by the High Elves. It lies in the ocean (equivalent to the Atlantic) to the west of the Old World, and east of the New World. It draws inspiration from Atlantis, Melniboné and Numenor. The Annuli Mountains run through the centre of the island. The capital and largest city of the High Elves is Lothern, located at a strait connecting the outer Ocean and Ulthuan's Inner Sea. Politically, the island is divided up into 10 Kingdoms, although they all owe loyalty to the Phoenix King (High King) in Lothern and the Everqueen in Avelorn. Prior to the High Elves, Ulthuan was inhabited by many Dragons, and many still slumber here under the mountains.

Outside of infrequent invasions, the only threats on Ulthuan are monsters in the Annuli Mountains. As Ulthuan is a magical floating island, the Underway and Under-Empire do not extend to it.

At the centre of the Inner Sea lies the Great Vortex, a magical storm that drains excess magical energy from the world, fed by a global network of waystones maintained by the High Elves. If the Vortex were to fail, magical energy would build up and allow large scale invasions of Daemons from the Realm of Chaos.

=== The New World ===
==== Naggaroth ====
Naggaroth is the cold, bleak land analogous to North America. It is dominated by the cruel Dark Elves, who broke away from the High Elves following a destructive civil war called the Sundering. Dark Elf society is tightly stratified and hierarchal, centered around the Witch King Malekith and the aristocracy. Worshipping Khaine, the god of murder, Dark Elves excel in hit-and-run tactics, slave-trading and sadism. Those Dark Elves who disobey the strict hierarchy are either killed or driven into exile. In general, Naggaroth is quite wild and sparsely inhabited. In the north it has a tundra climate, while in the centre pine forests grow, inhabited by Beastmen. In the south lie steaming subtropical swamps and a land bridge to Lustria. The Dark Elves dwell primarily in large cities in the northeast: Naggarond (the capital), Ghrond, Clar Karond, Karond Kar and Har Ganeth. In the west lie the Black Spine Mountains, home to outcast Dark Elves called Shades, and the dry west coast. To the north, Naggaroth borders the Chaos Wastes and the Dark Elves have constructed a system of Watchtowers to defend against Chaos incursions.

==== Lustria ====
Lustria is a tropical southern continent equivalent to South America. Most of the continent is covered in extremely dangerous tropical rainforest full of poisonous and venomous creatures. The Lizardmen (the oldest race) are the dominant power on the continent, and their ancient Temple-Cities (the greatest of which are Itza and Hexoatl) can be seen deep in the Jungle. Despite their bestial appearance, the Lizardmen are actually staunch opponents of Chaos and protectors of Order, although they are often apathetic towards the other races and hostile to those who trespass on Lustria. The wildlife of Lustria is dominated by large reptiles resembling dinosaurs and pterosaurs, and large insects which form the main food source of the Lizardmen. There is also various human, elven colonies along the coast, and undead (resulting from shipwrecked vampires) dominate The Vampire Coast in the east. In Lustria's west there is the volcanic Spine of Sotek mountains, and to the west of that is the more arid west coast. To the east of Lustria, across the Great Ocean, lies the Southlands. To the north, across an isthmus, lies Naggaroth.

=== Nehekhara ===
Nehekhara, also called “the Land of the Dead” lies to the South of the Badlands and Old World, west of the Dark Lands. To the west lies Araby and to the south, the Southlands.

Nehekhara is inhabited by the Tomb Kings, an undead faction based heavily on Ancient Egypt and pop culture undead mummies. Nehekhara has a dry climate, with much of it being desert. The western half of the country contains the Great Mortis (formerly Great Vitae) River and the largest city, Khemri as well as other cities. The east of the country, across the Charnel Pass and World's Edge Mountains, contains the infamous city of Lahmia.

The Tomb Kings/Nehekharans were formerly a living civilisation of humans. Their first King and uniter was Settra the Imperishable, who began the tradition of attempting to prolong life and avoid death. Thousands of years and many dynasties later, a new leader called Nagash came to power. Nagash became the first necromancer and indirectly created the first vampires in Lahmia, leading to civil war. Later, Nagash enacted a great ritual to kill everyone in Nehekhara and raise them again as undead slaves. During the ritual, Nagash was killed by the last King of Nehekhara, Alcadizzar. With the ritual gone awry, the mummified Nehekharan Kings and their skeletal soldiers awoke not to the promised afterlife, but to a nightmare of living death, and were very angry about this.

=== Norsca ===
Norsca is isomorphic in position within the “Old World” to Scandinavia, and similar in shape and climate. Its human occupants, the “Norse,” were originally based upon historical Vikings, though as the setting developed the Norse departed from the historical template increasingly and are now one of the main tribes of the Warriors of Chaos.

Norsca abuts the Realm of Chaos (also called Shadowlands by Norse, Kurgans and Hung and known as Chaos Wastes) to its north. To its south beyond the Sea of Claws lies the Empire and to the east and Southeast the Eastern Steppes and Kurgan nation and the Kingdom of Kislev, respectively. Between Norsca and Kislev is a wilderness area called Troll Country.

Norsca was originally populated by both High Elves and Dwarfs. Humans came to this land long after them. Norse Dwarves still remain and often come into conflict with the Norse tribes, but Elves have left the land. There are many ancient elven ruins. One of these mysterious places is the Forest of Knives, in the middle of Norsca, where an ancient Elven temple is located.

Some novels involving mostly Norse characters and places are C. L. Werner's Palace of the Plague Lord, Forged by Chaos and the Wulfrik, Valkia and Sigvald novels for Warhammer Heroes. The Legend of Sigmar novels also displays the Norse as the main antagonists of the first two books. Slaves to Darkness, by Gav Thorpe, also shows the Norse tribes as important supporting characters to the Imperial born Chaos Champion protagonist.

==== Norse Dwarfs ====
The Norse Dwarfs are the most northerly of the Dwarfs of the Old World. While related to the Dwarfs in their strongholds to the South, the separation over the years has led to some changes and the Norse Dwarfs have taken on some more wild characteristics compared to the mainstream of Dwarf society.

Norse Dwarfs are featured in the Warhammer Fantasy Roleplay (WFRP1) supplement Dwarfs: Stone & Steel and also in the (WFRP2) supplement Tome of Corruption.

- The main stronghold (capital) of Norse Dwarfs in Norsca is Kraka Drak. Other major holds included Sjoktraken port, Kraka Dorden, Kraka Onsmotek, Kraka Ravnvake.
- The 2008 Warhammer Fantasy Battle (7th edition) book: Warriors of Chaos, features story about the destruction of Kraka Drak. This is done by High King Valmir Aesling. Valmir was a great general of the mighty Chaos Champion and Everchosen Asavar Kul, so this story probably happens during the time of “World War III” (IC circa 2300), but it is implied to have happened shortly after the defeat of Asavar Kul. Even though the story gives the idea that Kraka Drak is totally destroyed, it is still featured in many sources that are dated after the war. One possibility is that hold was retaken by the Norse Dwarfs sometime after the war (or not totally taken by the invading Chaos Horde). Or it could be a simple oversight on the part of the writers.

==== The Norse ====
The Norse are, like the historical Norsemen, great seaborne explorers, traders, reavers, and slavers who have built and maintain colonies in Lustria (the Warhammer world's version of South and Mesoamerica).

Through the 1980s, the Norse troops and characters in Warhammer Fantasy were closely based on the historical Vikings. Later, the Norse were largely merged into the Chaos faction as the Warriors of Chaos (main human footsoldiers of Chaos). (Note: Main information about Norse can be found from the Liber Khorne which is Volume I of Liber Chaotica (other Volumes also have stories involving Norse characters), Warhammer Fantasy Roleplay (WFRP2) supplement Tome of Corruption and Hordes of Chaos supplement for Warhammer Fantasy Battle. Some information can be found from many other Warhammer sourcebooks, for example Warhammer Fantasy Roleplay (WFRP2) supplement Realm of the Ice Queen, which has little information about Norsii migration. There was also the large article about Norse for the use of Warhammer Fantasy Battle in the Citadel Journal Issue 6. Also Norse Marauders make an appearance in the mercenary supplement Dogs of War and Warhammer Fantasy Roleplay (WFRP3) Liber Carnagia adventure Crimson Rain (there is some information present on Norse customs and culture as well), which is part of Omens of War supplement. Various novels dealing with Norse characters, such as Wulfrik, Palace of the Plague Lord, Valkia and so on, also includes a lot of information regarding their culture.)

=== The Southlands ===
The Southlands correspond to real world West Africa. The Southlands lie south of the Land of the Dead and are dominated by dense swamplands and rain forest. These are inhabited by Lizardmen, savage orcs and forest goblins, and small tribes of what adventurers call the ‘Dark Men,’ who are content to live at peace with nature and seem to have the protection of the Lizardmen.

Lizardmen are the primary power in the Southlands and have five temple-cities, though one is ruined. Due to centuries of separation from their Lustrian brothers, the spawnings of saurus have become slightly rare and so skinks dominate in both civil life and warfare. Although similar in climate and culture to Lustria, the Southlands remain much less explored by human or High Elves and thus the Slann of the Southlands are said to have a much more complete set of Old One prophecies as they have not been pillaged by treasure hunters. However, the Slann practice of embalming their dead under pyramids is said to have had a major influence on the early Khemrian civilisation in the Land of the Dead, which suggests they were not always so isolated. They are reported to have come in conflict with the fabled “Lost Hold” of the Dwarfs, Karak Zorn, which is said to be located somewhere in the mountains of the Southlands.

The Southlands are believed to be the original homeland of the Dwarfs, where they began as simple cave dwellers using crude stone tools, before following the chain of mined riches up the mountain chain towards the north.

When the Skaven Clan Pestilens ravaged Lustria, they were driven out by Sotek and they migrated to the Southlands. Sotek also took action against them here by sending jungle swarms to destroy the clan.

=== Worlds Edge Mountains ===
The Worlds Edge Mountains are a significant geographic location in the fictional setting of the game of Warhammer Fantasy.

To the east of the Old World lies the ancient and impossibly high Worlds Edge Mountains. This snow-capped mountain range officially extends from the Nehekhara in the far south, up into the far north past Kislev, before branching west into Norsca. They separate the desolate Dark Lands in the east from the civilised lands of The Empire and Kislev in the west.

Though the unbroken chain of mountains reaches into the Southlands from the Worlds Edge Mountains, the peaks south of the Nehekharan deserts are technically part of the Great Mountains chain.

They are a prominent scene for many main events in the histories of the Dwarf, Orc and Goblin races.

==== Notable features ====
The High Pass is the northernmost route traversing the range, and descends into the lands of the Troll Country before its road leads eventually into the city of Praag in Kislev. A very popular invasion route for the marauder tribes of the west and the Orcish Warlord Grimgor Ironhide's greenskins hordes.

Peak Pass is the next most northerly passage across the mountains. It is overlooked at its eastern starting point by the greenskin fortress of Gnashrak's Lair, and at its western end by the Dwarf Stronghold of Karak Kadrin. In olden times it enabled Dwarfs to travel between the western and eastern fronts of the range. Though its importance has much declined since then and after the Dwarfs had forsaken the mines and watchposts on the eastern frontier. In the present times it must be guarded vigilantly for invading Orcs and Goblins moving from their eastern lairs use it as one of their main attack routes. The Karak Kadrin Dwarfs guard it fiercely against these intruders

The Silver Road is a central route that comes in from the easterly Wolf Lands. Its western opening bypasses The Dwarfen capital city Karaz-a-Karak, while its east is haunted by the Orc-infested ruins of the old Dwarf mine, Mount Silverspear, which is now known more commonly as Mount Grimfang, after the Orcish warlord who captured it. In olden times the pass was the scene of the bloody battles of the Silver Road Wars.

Black Fire Pass is originally named Haz-Drazh-Kadrin by the Dwarfs, which literally translates into human tongue as Passage of Black Flame. It forms a divider between the Black mountains and the World's Edge Mountains and is the main route between the lands of the Border Princes, Karaz-a-Karak and the southern regions of The Empire, travelling along the historical Old Dwarf Road. It is essentially a deep chasm, created when volcanic eruptions tore the peaks in ages past. Orc and goblin tribes in the south use this as their principal route of invasion through the mountains. More importantly, The Battle of Black Fire Pass was played out here, which an alliance of tribes of men of the time before the Empire, and the Dwarfs, engaged a massive invading greenskin army in the pass. The ensuing victory was the beginning of the founding of the nation of men under Sigmar.

Mad Dog Pass, alternately known as Varag Kadrin, was in the days of the Dwarf's greatest power, the chief thoroughfare to the isolated mines of the Dark Lands and the eastern front of the ranges. It is now only occasionally used, and studded with Night Goblin fortresses and their tunnels riddle its steep sides.

Black Water is an immense mountain lake high in the western highlands, and its Black Falls empty down into the Skull River. The lake is actually a vast crater, and was filled up with melted ice water from the surrounding snowy mountains. In ancient times a meteor fell from the heavens and punched this massive crater into the rock. Valuable metals and ores can be found all around the lake. Many Dwarf strongholds were founded around Black Water to mine and refine these meteoric ores, and to take advantage of the raging torrents gushing down the mountainside from the Black Falls, powering waterwheels and machinery. Its black depths are home to ancient and dark monsters. The Battle of Black Falls also took place here, when Dwarf and Goblin armies met on the shores of Black Water. The High King Alrik and the Goblin Warlord Gorkil Eyegouger were both slain while fighting along the edge of the Black Falls.

==== Volcanoes ====
The South World's Edge Mountains are more volcanically active than the northern regions. The largest volcanoes are named Fire Mountain, Red Cloud Mountain and Thunder Mountain. They continually bring up new minerals from the planet's interior, and thus attract many miners, although their settlements are frequently destroyed by eruptions and earthquakes.

==== Major locations ====
The Worlds Edge Mountains are a barren wilderness. The Dwarf Strongholds are the only enclaves of civilisation in the region. The Greenskins also have many crude settlements in the mountains, as do the Skaven. The fallen Holds are also home to these two races.

Karaz-a-Karak means Pinnacle of the Mountains and is also known to men as The Everpeak. This Dwarfen Hold is the largest and most powerful, and is also their capital city. Its lord is the High King of all the Dwarfs. Currently ruled over by High King Thorgrim Grudgebearer. The temples of the venerable Ancestor Gods are here, and is also home to the Great Book of Grudges, a vast account of all wrongdoings and breaches of faith against the Dwarfen race.

Karak Ungor, now known as Red Eye Mountain. It is now overrun by the Red Eye Tribe of the Night Goblins, and was the first Dwarfen Hold to fall. It sits in the north, overlooking western Kislev.

Karak Kadrin, has a reputation as being home to fierce Dwarf clans. Known commonly as Slayer Keep. Home to the Shrine of Grimnir, and where the Dwarf Slayer Cult makes pilgrimages to. Its King is bound by two incompatible Oaths. That of A King to his People, and that of his family's hereditary Slayer Oath, neither of which he can successfully fulfil without failing in the other.

Cripple Peak is the mountain spire in the south overlooking the Sour Sea. It is riddled with the tainted rock known as Warpstone, which is highly prized by the Skaven and Necromancers. It is the home of the Supreme Lord of the Undead, Nagash. A massive army of skeletal warriors patrols the ramparts of the fortified mountain while their master regains his power after the last time he was defeated. Nagash ordered the mountain to be mined for all of its Warpstone for his use in Necromancy, by his legions of undead and local human tribes which pledged allegiance to him out of terror. The lower regions are known as the Cursed Pit.

==== Dragons ====
The Worlds Edge Mountains are also home to many great Dragons. Throughout history there have been many dragon nests discovered by miners, and their hoards are of great proportions. Most of the time these dragons are in a deep slumber. Notable dragons include Skaladrak Incarnadine, Mordrak, Fyrskar and Graug the Terrible.

== See also ==
- Total War: Warhammer
- Warhammer 40,000
- Warhammer Age of Sigmar
- Warhammer Fantasy Roleplay
- Warhammer: Invasion
