= Warhammer (game) =

Miniature wargame

Warhammer Fantasy Battle
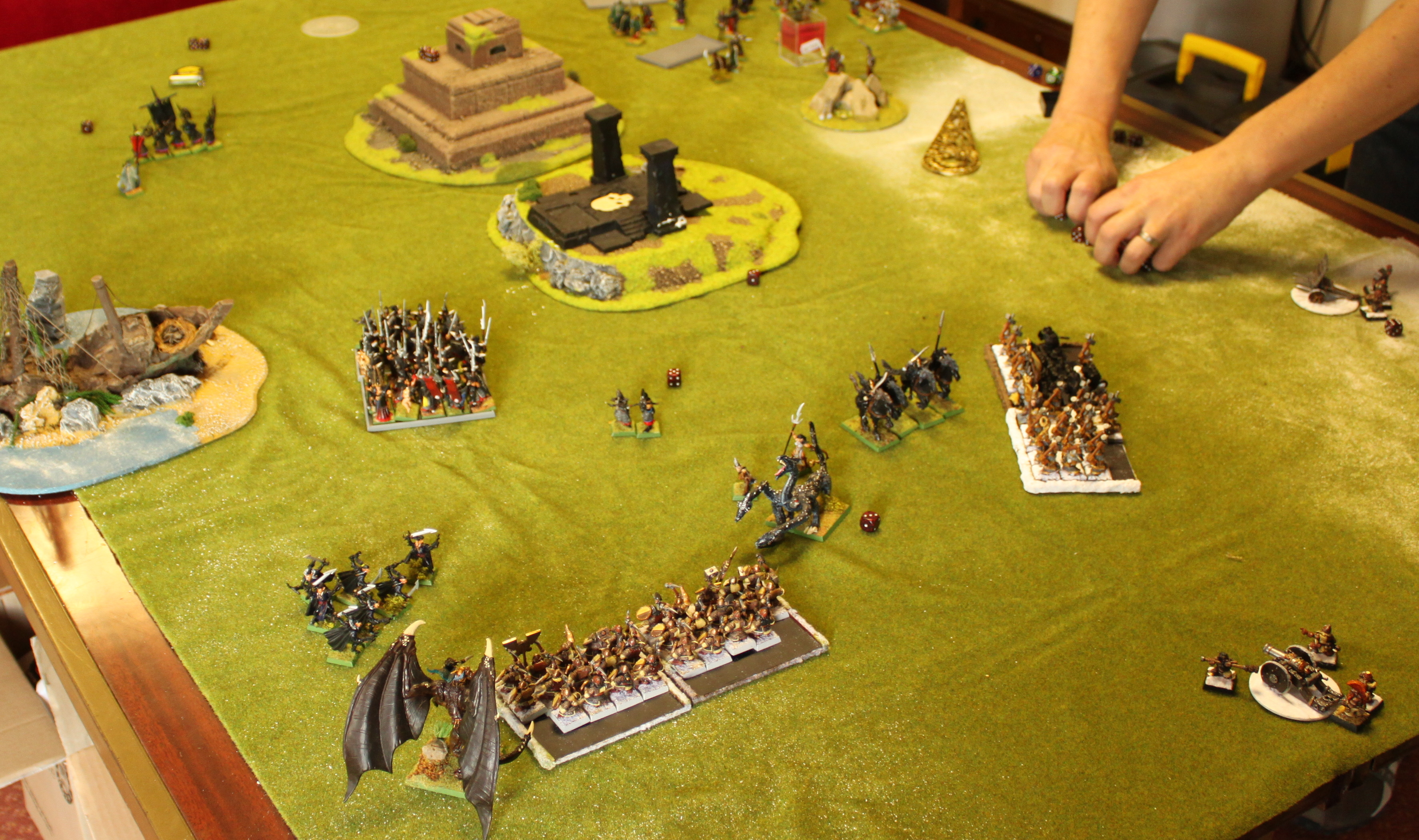
- Manufacturers: Games Workshop
- Publishers: Games Workshop
- Years active: (Original) 1983–2015 (The Old World) 2024-Present
- Genres: Miniature wargame
- Players: 2+
- Setup time: Varies, depending on the size of the game, but usually around 10 to 20 minutes
- Playing time: Varies, depending on the size of the game, but usually around three hours
- Chance: Medium – dice rolling
- Skills: Military strategy, arithmetic, spatial awareness
- Succeeded by: Warhammer Age of Sigmar
- Website: www.warhammer.com

Warhammer (formally Warhammer: The Mass Combat Fantasy Roleplaying Game, Warhammer: Fantasy Battle, and Warhammer: The Game of Fantasy Battles. Informally just Warhammer Fantasy) is a British tabletop miniature wargame with a medieval fantasy theme. The game was created by Bryan Ansell, Richard Halliwell, and Rick Priestley, and first published by the Games Workshop company in 1983.

As in other miniature wargames, players use miniature models (minis) to represent warriors. The playing field is a model battlefield comprising models of buildings, trees, hills, and other terrain features. Players take turns moving their model warriors across the playing field and simulate a battle. The outcomes of fights between the models are determined by a combination of dice rolls and simple arithmetic. Though the gameplay is mostly based on medieval warfare, it incorporates fantasy elements such as wizards, dragons, and magical spells.

Warhammer was the first commercial miniature wargame designed to use proprietary models. Prior to this, miniature wargames rulesets were designed to use generic models that could be bought from any manufacturer.

The first edition rulebook for Warhammer was released in 1983, and the line was supported for thirty years by model releases, supplementary rulebooks, and new editions of the core rules. The eighth edition of the core rules was released on 10 July 2010. The game is no longer supported by Games Workshop, and the last supplementary rulebook was released in 2015, this came after The End Times, a setting-wide event that culminated in the destruction of the Warhammer world. It was replaced later that year by Warhammer Age of Sigmar, which uses the models created for the Warhammer line in a new setting and game system. In 2024, Warhammer Fantasy was brought back in a reboot known as Warhammer The Old World, which brings a new version of the old rules and updated models.

The Warhammer setting is inspired by the fiction of J. R. R. Tolkien, Poul Anderson and Michael Moorcock. The fictional background for the game was developed in rulebooks, White Dwarf magazine, Inferno! magazine, and more than 150 novels set in the Warhammer universe. Many of these novels are still in print under the Warhammer Chronicles imprint.

== Gameplay ==
Warhammer is a tabletop wargame where two or more players compete against each other with "armies" of 25 mm – 250 mm tall miniatures. The rules of the game have been published in a series of books which describe how to move miniatures around the game surface and simulate combat in a "balanced and fair" manner. Games may be played on any appropriate surface, although the standard is a 6 by 4 ft (1.8 by 1.2 m) tabletop decorated with model scenery in scale with the miniatures. Any individual miniature or group of similar miniatures in the game is called a "unit".

The core game rules are supplied in a single book, with supplemental Warhammer Armies texts giving guidelines and background for army-specific rules. Movement of units about the playing surface is generally measured in inches, and units' combat performance is dictated randomly by either the roll of a 6-sided die (a 'D6') or a 6-sided 'scatter' die. The latter is often used to generate direction, commonly alongside an 'artillery' die, for cannons, stone-throwers, and other artillery. Each unit and option within the game is assigned a point value for balancing purposes. A game will commonly have armies of 750 to 3,000 points, although smaller and larger values are possible.

== The Warhammer world ==
Warhammer is set in a fictional universe notable for its "dark and gritty" background world, which features influences from Michael Moorcock's Elric stories, and also many historical influences.

The geography of the Warhammer world closely resembles that of Earth because of manipulation by an ancient spacefaring race known as the Old Ones. This mysterious and powerful race visited the Warhammer World in the distant past. Establishing an outpost, they set about manipulating the geography and biosphere of the planet. With the assistance of their Slann servants, they moved the planet's orbit closer to its sun, and arranged the continents to their liking.

To travel between worlds, the Old Ones used portals to another dimension ("warp gates"), which they built at the north and south poles of the Warhammer World. Eventually, however, these gates collapsed, allowing raw magical energy and the daemonic forces of Chaos to pour forth into the Warhammer world. At this point, the Old Ones disappeared. Before leaving, however, they had established the Lizard men (ruled over by the Slann) as their servants. In addition they had created the races of Elves, Dwarfs, Humans, Halflings and presumably the Ogres (who are assumed to be an unfinished attempt by the Old Ones to create the ultimate race). Orcs and Goblins were not created by the Old Ones, nor were they part of their plan, and their origin is not made clear in the setting. Beastmen and Skaven were the result of mutation from raw magical energy at this time. Eventually the Chaos Daemons were driven back by Lizardmen and Elves, with the Elves performing a great ritual to drain out the raw magic that was flowing into the world and sustaining the Daemons. Some creatures, such as Dragons and Dragon-Ogres, are stated to have existed prior to the arrival of the Old Ones.

After this, Elves and Dwarfs flourished and created mighty empires, but eventually they were set into a slow decline. A series of civil wars amongst the Elves split them into two groups – the malicious Dark Elves and righteous High Elves. A petty war between the High Elves and Dwarfs served only to diminish both races and caused the High Elves to abandon their colonies. Some of the colonists refused to leave their homes in a magical sapient forest and over time developed into the enigmatic and isolationist Wood Elves. A period of seismic activity caused by the Slann decimated the underground holds of the Dwarfs, while attacks by Skaven and Goblins, who breached the Dwarf strongholds from below, only made things more desperate.

The Humans were the slowest to develop, but ultimately formed several strong nations able to defend themselves from aggressors. The Nehekharan Empire (based on Ancient Egypt) was the first great Human empire, but due to a curse by Nagash (the first necromancer) they became an undead faction known as the "Tomb Kings" who now dwell in The Land of the Dead (former Nehekhara). Nagash, in his efforts to find eternal life, also created the first Vampires, an entirely separate undead faction.

At the time of the setting's destruction (according to the setting's fictional timeline) there were two prominent Human nations: The Empire which is based on a combination of aspects of the Holy Roman Empire and Renaissance Germany, and Bretonnia, which is based on Arthurian legends and medieval France. Sigmar, founder of The Empire, wielded a mighty Dwarf-made Warhammer from which the name of the "Warhammer Fantasy" setting is derived. There are also numerous other nations which are fleshed out in the background information but are not represented by playable factions in the tabletop game, some of which are loosely based on real-world nations from various historical periods. These include the southern realms of Estalia and Tilea, representing medieval Spain and Renaissance Italy respectively, as well as the far eastern Empire of Grand Cathay, analogous to a fantastic version of Imperial China.

The forces of disorder are often depicted as not a localised threat, but a general menace consisting of disparate factions, many of which are typically also at odds with each other. The Skaven exist in an "Under Empire" (an extensive network of tunnels beneath the planet's surface), while the war-loving Orcs and Goblins are nomadic (although they are most common in the Badlands, Southlands, and Dark Lands) and regularly amass large numbers and stage raids without warning. Similarly, Ogres are most common in the Ogre Kingdoms and in the eastern Mountains of Mourn, but are depicted as unscrupulous wandering warriors who are always hungry, and who sometimes hire themselves out as mercenaries to both the forces of order and disorder.

In addition to the chaos-worshiping Warriors of Chaos who live in strange Chaos Wastes north of the other faction's lands, chaos cults often arise within human and elven nations. Beastmen are depicted as mutants dwelling deep in forests and impossible to fully eradicate. Vampires and necromancers raising armies of undead are also depicted often as an internal threat. Chaos Daemons are restricted to manifesting themselves where magical energy is strongest, but this could be almost anywhere.

The 8th Edition Empire Army Book describes the Warhammer World to currently be in the year 2522 (Empire calendar), whilst the current Lizardmen Army Book puts the collapse of the warpgates at −5700 on the same calendar, thus the fictional history spans at least 8200 years.

== Armies ==
There are a number of playable armies for Warhammer, which are representative of one or other of the factions or races that are present in the Warhammer world setting. For the first few editions of the game armies were presented in collective books like Warhammer Armies. Starting in the 4th edition individual books were released for each army.

In the 8th edition of the game, the following armies had individual army books:

- Beastmen
- Bretonnia
- Daemons of Chaos
- Dark Elves
- Dwarfs
- The Empire
- High Elves
- Lizardmen
- Ogre Kingdoms
- Orcs and Goblins
- Skaven
- Tomb Kings
- Vampire Counts
- Warriors of Chaos
- Wood Elves

During the 6th edition, the following armies had official rules available from the Games Workshop website, and were usable throughout the 6th and 7th editions. These rules have since been taken down, and they were unplayable in the 8th edition.

- Chaos Dwarfs: The White Dwarf Presents army book was released during the 4th Edition as a collection of White Dwarf articles, but is still considered an official rule book. An official Chaos Dwarf army list was included in Ravening Hordes at the start of the 6th edition. The army list was included in the reference section of the 7th edition, but has been removed from the 8th edition rulebook. This model line was discontinued at the end of the 5th edition and is no longer supported by the main rules. Forge World released Chaos Dwarf models under their Warhammer Forge line.
- Dogs of War: The official army book was released during the 5th Edition; Regiments of Renown and Mercenary Army lists for the 6th edition were released on the website. Regardless, some of this line remained available for direct order from Games Workshop as late as 2013.
- Kislev: The army book was given away free with White Dwarf magazine during the 6th edition. This model line has since been discontinued and is no longer supported.

Armies that were left unsupported prior to the 6th edition:

- Fimir

Whilst armies would have a typical aesthetic some players would use a method of customisation known as converting, or 'kitbashing'. To convert a model, a player would take parts of other model kits and them it to make aesthetic/cosmetic changes to another model. A kitbash would typically have no effect on rules or gameplay.

== Editions ==
Throughout the eight editions of the game, the core movement, combat and shooting systems remained generally unchanged, with only minor revisions between editions. The most significant changes which ensure incompatibility between editions have been made to the magic, army composition systems, and specialist troop types.

The starter armies in the box sets have grown more detailed with each succeeding generation, and the 7th edition (2006) was the first to be titled as a scenario ("The Battle for Skull Pass") instead of just Warhammer Fantasy Battle. For example, the High Elves have appeared in the 4th edition (1992) and the 8th edition (2010); while the 4th edition only contained Spearmen and Bowmen figures (essentially, just two types of figurines) plus cardboard cutouts for the general and a warmachine, the 8th edition contained a more widely varied army (including cavalry, Sword Masters, mage, and a general mounted on a griffon).

=== Inspiration ===
Published in November 1981 for its second edition (1978 for the very first one), and written by Richard Halliwell and Rick Priestley, Reaper is considered the ancestor of Warhammer Fantasy Battle. Reaper is more a skirmish game for up to 30 miniatures rather than a large-scale wargame.

=== First edition (1983) ===
The first edition, written by Bryan Ansell, Richard Halliwell and Rick Priestley was published in 1983 as Warhammer The Mass Combat Fantasy Role-Playing Game and consists of a boxed set of three black and white books illustrated by Tony Ackland: Vol 1: Tabletop Battles, which contains the core rules, turn sequence, creature lists, potion recipes and features an introductory battle 'The Ziggurat of Doom'. Vol 2: Magic which explains rules for wizards of four different levels and the higher order 'arch magi'. Higher level wizards have access to more powerful spells. In this system, a wizard picks his spells at the start of the game, must have the correct equipment (usually Amulets), and as he casts each one it depletes a store of 'constitution' points, until at zero points he could cast no more. Vol 3: Characters introduces 'personal characteristics' statistics, rules for roleplaying (including character advancement through experience points and statistic gains, random encounters, equipment costs, and alignment) and has a sample campaign "The Redwake River Valley".

Very little world background is given at all and the race descriptions are kept to a minimum, and most of the background given is in describing the origins of magic items. Some notable differences to later editions are the inclusion of Night Elves (later Dark Elves), the appearance of Red Goblins – and that Citadel Miniatures order codes are given.

==== Critical reaction ====
In the July 1983 edition of White Dwarf, (Issue 43), Joe Dever gave the system a positive review, saying, "If you regularly wargame with miniatures, or have been wondering what additional fun you could have from your rapidly growing collection of fantasy figures, then I recommend you check out Warhammer and let battle commence!"

Chris Hunter reviewed Warhammer for Imagine magazine, and stated that "if you are looking for a mass fantasy combat system, I would recommend Warhammer; but if all you want is a fantasy role-playing game, it would perhaps be better to look elsewhere".

In the May 1984 edition of Dragon (Issue 85), Katherine Kerr was not impressed, and called it "one of the most irritating new games I’ve ever read." She found the manuscript full of typographical errors, and "On top of it all, the authors have a miserable command of the English language. Their prose is even more awkward than the usual low level of gaming writing and is studded with grammatical errors." She found the game system divided between a good combat system and a poor roleplaying system, and called the effort "two separate games with a weak attempt to link them together. The first, a set of rules for tabletop battles with miniature figures, is very good; the second, pieces of a fantasy role-playing game, is embarrassingly bad." In the same issue, Ken Rolston also reviewed Warhammer, and although he agreed that the rules were "hardly a model of English usage or proofreading," they were well-organised and readable. Rolston agreed with Kerr that the miniatures rules were the strong suit of the system, but he also admired the psychology rules that determined how classic fantasy racial types behave towards each other. However, he found the role-playing system to be "primitive".

In the January–February 1985 edition of Space Gamer (Issue No. 72), Edwin J. Rotondaro also thought the system was divided between good miniatures rules and bad roleplaying rules. "Overall, I have to say that Warhammer is a good miniatures game, but a terrible roleplaying game. The system is flexible enough to be used as a mass combat module in most RPGs, but you have to decide whether it's worth [the price] for a set of fantasy miniatures rules."

==== Expansion ====
The first edition was extended with Forces of Fantasy boxed set in 1984.

=== Second edition (1985) ===
The second edition of Warhammer was released in January 1985. It split the rules into three rulebooks — Combat, Battle Magic and Battle Bestiary, with full-colour artwork by John Blanche. There were few substantive changes in rules, but major clarifications of the original rules were included. New rules included uses and effects of standards and musicians, flying, fortifications, fire, artillery, chariots, reserve units, specialist spellcasters, and poisons.

This edition also further developed "The Known World", which was geographically and socially based upon Earth. Expansions to WFB had linked scenario battles and some included card buildings to assemble for scenery and card figures to use instead of miniatures. The expansions included Magnificent Sven, The Tragedy of McDeath, Bloodbath at Orc's Drift, and Terror of the Lichemaster. (Note: The titles being puns on The Magnificent Seven, Shakespear's Macbeth and Rorkes Drift)

==== Critical reaction ====
Paul Mason reviewed Warhammer II for Imagine magazine, and stated that "All in all, Warhammer is a much improved package, which covers the field of Fantasy Figures Wargaming with simple rules, and yet more comprehensively than virtually any other product."

In the June 1985 edition of White Dwarf (Issue #66), Robert Alcock called the second edition "a predictable expansion of the original", although he noted that this edition had "not ironed out all the problems." Alcock especially disliked the mechanic of "throwing a bucket full of dice to cause casualties and then find that your opponent gets most of them back with a saving throw." However, despite these issues, Alcock concluded that "Warhammer does remain the only viable set of fantasy mass battle rules", and gave the second edition an overall rating of 8 out of 10.

==== Reviews ====
- Jeux & Stratégie #49

=== Third edition (1987) ===
The Third Edition of the game was published as a single hardback book in December 1987. It had the most in-depth and complex movement and manoeuvre system of any edition. Other changes included a variety of new specialist troop types, rules for war machines and a more finely tuned system of representing heroes and wizards. It kept the same magic system and open-ended army design system as the first two editions. However, by this stage the use of army lists was very much encouraged. Army lists for this edition were published in a separate book called Warhammer Armies in 1988; until then, use of the 2nd Edition's Ravening Hordes list was encouraged. This is partly because it was the last edition published before Games Workshop took a different commercial approach, leading to competition from former GW employees in the briefly published competing Fantasy Warlord.

The third edition was expanded with the Realm of Chaos: tome one, Slaves To Darkness, followed by tome two, The Lost and the Damned; and Warhammer Siege books. Realm of Chaos and Siege gave background and rules for both WFB and WH40K.

==== Critical reaction ====
In Issue 37 of Challenge, Timothy B. Brown commented, "I admire miniatures use in role-playing games, and I feel Warhammer Fantasy Battle, though not futuristic, is a terrific set of rules." Overall, Brown thought this game "accomplishes handily what it sets out to do. [...] All the elements are there — monsters, magic, heroic characters — the works. I've never seen as complete a rules set as this one." He concluded, "Can I recommend buying it? Well, yes I can, since I have an interest in all types of gaming. If you’re a science-fiction gamer and that's it, Warhammer Fantasy Battle probably isn't for you. However, if you get the chance to look through it, you might change your mind."

In the February 1989 edition of Dragon (Issue 142), Ken Rolston gave the third edition high praise, saying, "If you’re serious about fantasy tabletop gaming, Warhammer Fantasy Battle (WFB) is probably your only choice. Rolston liked the "fast-paced" rules system and developed fantasy background, and his only reservations were about presentation: "The text is dense and wordy. The wealth of diagrams is good, but their captions aren’t always clear. The abundance of photos, illustrations, and paintings is often visually stimulating, but many of these graphics are of marginal or negligible relevance to the accompanying text. The black-and-white photographic reproduction is surprisingly poor." He concluded with a strong recommendation: "The fantasy campaign setting is simply super. The series of revised editions, supplements, and magazine support articles indicates that Games Workshop is interested in and capable of catering to the gamer’s appetite for new features, refined editions, and elaborated fantasy campaign materials."

=== 4th edition (1992) and 5th edition (1996) ===
The fourth and fifth editions of the game, released in October 1992 and October 1996, respectively, were similar to each other but quite different from the third. The fifth edition in particular became known pejoratively as "Herohammer" because of the imbalance between the very powerful heroes, monsters and wizards in the game and blocks of troops which existed effectively as cannon fodder. Both editions of the game were sold as box sets containing not only the rulebooks and a variety of other play aids but also sufficient plastic miniatures to be able to play the game "out of the box". The rules underwent a re-write compared to the 3rd Edition. A completely re-worked magic system was produced which was available as a boxed expansion set. Rather than selecting spells they were drawn at random and the magic phase was based on the play of these cards, making magic a bit like a game within a game. The magic system was further expanded by the Arcane Magic box set and the magic element of the Chaos box set.

The fourth edition was also the first edition to enforce the use of army lists in the form of separate Warhammer Army books for the separate racial groupings. These books prescribed for each army a limited number of unit choices; specifying limits on the number of points that could be spent on "characters", troops and monsters and so on. The books also included background on the particular army, illustrations and photographs showing models and have remained with the game though updated with the rules.

The magic system was reworked and re-released in December 1996 as a single box covering the magic for all the armies. The magic was "toned down" (WD204) with spell casting limited to the players' own turn. The multiple card packs of the Colours of Magic system was replaced by 20 Battle Magic spell cards but the Colour Magic spells were in the rule book for players to use if they wanted.

Several boxed campaign packs were produced, Tears of Isha for example, gave a campaign for High Elves and included a card "building" to assemble. Likewise, the Orc and Goblin themed campaign Idol of Gork included card idols of the Orc deities Gork and Mork. The others were Circle of Blood (Vampire Counts vs Bretonnians), Grudge of Drong (Dwarves vs High Elves) and Perilous Quest (Bretonnians vs Wood Elves).

The fourth edition featured High Elves versus Goblins. The fifth edition, released in 1996, re-introduced the Bretonnian forces, which had been left out of the 4th edition, and re-worked the Slann heavily to create the Lizardmen armies.

In 1997, the fifth edition of Warhammer Fantasy Battles won the Origins Award for Best Fantasy or Science Fiction Miniatures Rules of 1996.

==== Critical reaction ====
Chris McDonough reviewed Warhammer in White Wolf #34 (Jan./Feb., 1993), rating it a 3 out of 5 and stated that "Overall, flaws aside, the rules are fun and it's a nice set for those looking to join the fantasy battle hobby. Unfortunately, because of the miniature choices and the lack of magic, it's not the 'everything in one box' game that I hoped it would be."

Mark Donald reviewed Warhammer for Arcane magazine, rating it a 7 out of 10 overall, and stated that "This is an excellent launch pad into a virtually bottomless wargames system with a great background."

==== Reviews ====
- Australian Realms #8
- Backstab (Issue 1 - Jan/Feb 1997)
- Magia i Miecz #51 (March 1998) (Polish)

=== 6th edition (2000) ===
The sixth edition, released in 2000, was also published as a box with soft-cover rulebook and miniatures (Orcs and Empire). The Rulebook was also available for separate sale, hard-cover in the first printing and soft-cover after that. After the fifth edition, this edition put the emphasis back on troop movement and combat: heroes and wizards were still important but became incapable of winning games in their own right. There was also an all-new magic system based on dice rolling.

==== Reviews ====
- Pyramid
- Backstab #24

=== 7th edition (2006) ===
The seventh edition rules were released on 9 September 2006. It was available in two forms: as a single hardback rulebook for established gamers and as a complete boxed set game complete with plastic miniatures (Dwarfs and Goblins), The Battle for Skull Pass supplement book and a soft-cover rulebook that has less artwork and background material than the hardback version. The smaller rulebook from the boxed set was approximately half the size of the large book both in size of the cover and page count. The "Basic Rules" and "Advanced Rules" sections of both books were identical in text, layout, illustrations, credits, page numbering and ISBN. The two books had different front pieces and the larger rulebook has two extensive addition sections "The Warhammer World" (68 pages) and "The Warhammer Hobby" (56 pages) plus slightly expanded appendices.

=== 8th edition (2010) ===
The 8th edition of Warhammer was made available for pre-order on 14 June 2010 and was released 10 July 2010.

The new starter set named Island of Blood contained armies of High Elves and Skaven, a condensed mini-rulebook, as well as 10 standard dice, one scatter and one artillery die, two 18 inch rulers, and three blast templates. The High Elf and Skaven miniatures from Island of Blood were reused for the Age of Sigmar set Spire of Dawn.

The Orcs and Goblins, Dwarfs, Wood Elves and Tomb Kings army books were updated for this edition.

The 8th edition was expanded with the Storm of Magic 'supplement' in 2011, featuring rules for using more destructive magic and monsters. The second expansion was release shortly after: Blood in the Badlands, which included some special scenarios and introduced rules for siege warfare. In 2013, Triumph and Treachery (an expansion that allows multi-player games of between 3 and 5 players) and Sigmar's Blood (a 5 scenario short campaign between Empire and Vampire Counts following the crusade led by Volkmar to destroy Mannfred von Carstein) were released. Another series of five books was released in 2014–15, entitled The End Times. This expansion saw the appearance of every major character of the setting. The last book, Archaon, described the end of the Warhammer world at the hand of the book's namesake.

==== Reviews ====
- Casus Belli (v4, Issue 15 - Jun/Jul 2015)

=== Warhammer: The Old World (2024) ===
Warhammer: The Old World was released on 20 January 2024. While not described by Games Workshop as the 9th edition of Warhammer, Warhammer: The Old World features a base rules system similar to previous Warhammer editions. Ten factions are actively supported, nine of which are factions returning from previous editions and one which is a brand new faction (Empire of Grand Cathay). The returning faction rules are split over two books, Forces of Fantasy (Empire of Man, Dwarfen Mountain Holds, Kingdom of Bretonnia, Wood Elf Realms, and High Elf Realms), and Ravening Hordes (Orc & Goblin Tribes, Warriors of Chaos, Beastmen Brayherds, and Tomb Kings of Khemri). Seven other factions (Dark Elves, Skaven, Vampire Counts, Daemons of Chaos, Ogre Kingdoms, Lizardmen, and Chaos Dwarfs) received army rules published online, but will not receive any additional support throughout the first edition of the game.

== Derivative games ==
Games based on the core Warhammer mechanics and rules include:

- Warhammer Ancient Battles (often referred to as "WAB" and sometimes Warhammer Historical). Intended to simulate armies of the real world of the Ancient and Medieval periods.
- A science fiction based skirmish wargame using similar rules was developed by Rick Priestley as Warhammer 40,000: Rogue Trader by Games Workshop and released in 1987. Originally using a minor variation of the 2nd edition Warhammer Fantasy Battle rules, the two games have subsequently taken different development paths. This has since developed into the separate Warhammer 40,000 setting.
- The first edition of Blood Bowl uses the same basic turn system and character statistics as Warhammer to simulate a fantasy American football game. Rules for ranged combat applied to ball throwing. Since the second edition of Blood Bowl the game has taken its own development path. A card game inspired by the game has also been developed.
- Games Workshop released a skirmish scale wargame set in the world of Warhammer called Mordheim. It is set in the destroyed city of Mordheim 500 years earlier in the Warhammer world timeline. It uses the same basic rules as the 5th edition of Warhammer, but modified to support activation of individual models in a small gang. It also has a campaign system which you use to improve your warband as they gain experience.
- The Warhammer Fantasy Battles rules led to Warhammer Fantasy Roleplay in 1986, again using the same statistics, although presented as percentiles rather than 1–10 to give more detail and differentiation between characters than is required in a wargame. In 2005 Black Industries released a second edition, later licensing the rights to Fantasy Flight Games. In 2009 Fantasy Flight Games discontinued active support for the second edition due to the release of the third edition. From 2017, the license was granted to Cubicle 7, who have issued a fourth edition and made publications for the previous editions available in digital format.
- Dark Heresy (another role-playing game) was released by Black Industries in 2008 using a variation of the 2nd edition of Warhammer Fantasy Roleplay. The line was transferred to Fantasy Flight Games, which then released Rogue Trader (2009), Deathwatch (2010), Black Crusade (2011), and Only War (2013), each using close variants of the Dark Heresy engine. As of 2019, the license to produce role-playing games in the Warhammer 40,000 setting is held by Cubicle 7.
- Games Workshop released Judge Dredd: The Role-Playing Game (1985) was clearly derived from the same percentile mechanics as Warhammer Fantasy Roleplay.
- Inquisitor is a detailed, percentage based miniatures game set in the derivative Warhammer 40K setting. The mechanics fall somewhere between 1st Edition Warhammer Fantasy Roleplay and Warhammer 40K.

Games based on the Warhammer setting, but not sharing the rules, include:

- Warmaster, representing very large-scale, epic battles. Warmaster uses smaller models than Warhammer using 10 mm as opposed to 28 mm, with different rules regarding troop movement and combat.
- In 1987, GW released a board game Chaos Marauders
- In 1989, GW released another board game, Advanced Heroquest
- In 1993, Games Workshop released a naval wargame set in the world of Warhammer called Man O' War.
- In 1990, Games Workshop released a strategic wargame of empire building, Mighty Empires, intended both as a stand-alone game and as a way to manage a campaign of miniature battles. This was followed in 1991 by Dragon Masters, an introductory game reusing some Mighty Empires assets in which players take the role of competing Elven princes in Ulthuan.
- In 1995 the boardgame Warhammer Quest was released. Based upon the Warhammer Fantasy Battle system it shared many of the same combat mechanics as well as the setting, while building upon the previous game Advanced Heroquest. Warhammer Quest was followed by two expansions, Lair of the Orc Lord and Catacombs of Terror, nine Character Packs and several Card Packs.
- Warhammer Fantasy Battle has been adapted as computer games: the 1995 Warhammer: Shadow of the Horned Rat, its 1998 sequel Warhammer: Dark Omen, Warhammer: Mark of Chaos and the MMORPG, Warhammer Online: Age of Reckoning which was released on 18 September 2008.
- Chaos in the Old World has been released (2009)
- On 1 October 2011, Games Workshop released the one-off game, Dreadfleet.
- Fantasy Flight Games' Warhammer Fantasy Roleplay 3rd edition is a new game engine not derived from the earlier game mechanics. It was released in 2009.
- Warhammer Quest card game has been released (2015)
- Warhammer: End Times - Vermintide is a first-person shooter video game developed and published by Fatshark that was released on 23 October 2015. A sequel titled Warhammer: Vermintide 2 was released on 8 March 2018.
- Total War: Warhammer is a turn-based strategy real-time tactics video game developed by the Creative Assembly and published by Sega that was released on 24 May 2016. It was followed by a sequel that was released on 28 September 2017. The second sequel, Total War: Warhammer III, was released on 17 February 2022.

== See also ==
- Warhammer computer games
- List of Warhammer publications
