= First and Only =

1999 novel by Dan Abnett

- First edition
- Author: Dan Abnett
- Cover artist: Adrian Smith
- Language: English
- Series: Gaunt's Ghosts
- Genre: Military science fiction
- Publisher: Black Library
- Publication date: August 1999
- Publication place: United Kingdom
- Media type: Print (Paperback)
- ISBN: 9781841541013
- Followed by: Ghostmaker

First and Only is a military science fiction novel by Dan Abnett, set in the Warhammer 40,000 universe. Published in 1999, it is the first novel in the Gaunt's Ghosts series, which, as of 2019, consists of 16 novels and multiple short stories, as well as two spin-off novels (Titanicus and Double Eagle) and a companion book that acts as a mock history of the military campaign which forms the setting of the series.

The work is Abnett's first published novel, and was also the first novel published under Games Workshop's Black Library imprint. Prior to then, Games Workshop published short stories in its magazine Inferno!, and a limited number of novels, including Ian Watson's novel Space Marine and Inquisition War trilogy, under the label "Heretic Tomes."

As of 2006, it remained Black Library's best-selling title.

== Publication history ==
Abnett first wrote a set of loosely connected short stories which appeared in Inferno! magazine (issues 4, 8, and 30). The next story, entitled "Vermilion Level", was written out to novel length as First and Only and published in 1999. The earlier-published short stories were subsequently incorporated as flashback-style chapters of Ghostmaker, the second volume of the series.

The first three novels of the series, First and Only, Ghostmaker, and Necropolis were collected, along with the short story "In Remembrance", into the omnibus The Founding, published by Black Library in 2007.

In 2013, First and Only was re-published as one of Black Library's three earliest-published and most influential novels, along with Graham McNeill's Nightbringer (also taking place in the Warhammer 40,000 universe), and William King's Trollslayer (the inaugural novel of the Gotrek and Felix series taking place in the Warhammer Fantasy universe).

In 2019, Black Library announced a limited edition hardcover re-publication to commemorate the novel's 20th anniversary.

== Synopsis ==
In the 41st Millennium, the Tanith First light infantry regiment of the Imperial Guard is part of the massive Imperial force fighting to retake the Sabbat Worlds from the forces of Chaos. The regiment is informally called the "First And Only" (because it was actually formed from the survivors of three regiments raised just before their homeworld of Tanith was destroyed by the enemy), or sometimes "Gaunt's Ghosts", after their commanding officer, Colonel-Commissar Ibram Gaunt, and their superlative skills at stealth and infiltration tactics.

During their latest combat theatre, the Ghosts are instrumental in re-taking the world of Fortis Binary from the enemy, partnered with the Vitrian Dragoons regiment, while another regiment, the Jantine Patricians, feel cheated of glory.

Granted temporary R&R on Pyrites, the Ghosts escape a trap laid for them by the Patricians. Gaunt is contacted by an old friend, Fereyd, who warns him that the army's superior, Lord General Dravere, is conspiring to supplant Warmaster Macaroth as supreme commander of the campaign, and something hidden on the campaign's next target world, Menazoid Epsilon, is vital to the conspiracy.

While en route to Menazoid Epsilon, Gaunt's subordinate, Major Rawne, is abducted by Patrician soldiers and brutally interrogated by Inquisitor Heldane, who is assisting General Dravere's plans. The Ghosts rescue Rawne, and Heldane is badly wounded.

In the midst of the fighting on Menazoid Epsilon, Fereyd rendezvous with Gaunt, who leads him to an underground bunker containing an incredible find from mankind's "Dark Age of Technology": an intact Standard Template Constructor, an automated factory capable of mass-producing "Men of Iron" (self-aware robots). Dravere and Heldane's agents discovered evidence of the factory and realized they could build an army loyal to themselves that was powerful enough for any purpose.

Dravere, aware now that the Ghosts are working against his plans, declares them traitors and orders the Jantine Patricians to wipe them out. The small picket force of 50 Ghosts that Gaunt left behind to guard their rear is killed to the last man by the Patricians, but not before inflicting over seven-to-one casualties on their attackers, which further enrages the Patricians' commander, Colonel Flense.

To Fereyd's surprise, Gaunt insists that the factory must be destroyed immediately. Fereyd is actually a puppet, being controlled by Heldane's psychic powers from his sickbed inside Dravere's headquarters vehicle. Heldane panics and orders Fereyd to kill Gaunt, but Major Rawne (who Gaunt suspected of being brainwashed by Heldane in captivity) saves Gaunt's life by shooting Fereyd in the head. This causes a massive feedback in Heldane's psychic energies that explodes, destroying Dravere's headquarters and killing both conspirators.

The novel is intercut with a series of flashbacks: the young Ibram Gaunt is orphaned when his father is killed in action, and sent to a Military School by his father's commanding officer, General Aldo Dercius. But during his first campaign as a Commissar, Gaunt is approached by an enemy prisoner, a rogue psychic, who tells him the truth: his father died when Dercius fled the battle and left the elder Gaunt to die. Using his ostensible authority to punish cowardice, Gaunt confronts his "Uncle" Dercius and kills him in a chainsword duel.

After blowing up the factory, Gaunt and his small entourage are confronted by Colonel Flense, who reveals that he is General Dercius's son, and was forced to change his name and restart his career from scratch after the family disgrace. Flense tries to kill Gaunt, but Gaunt gains the upper hand and kills him instead.

When the Ghosts emerge from the bunker, they are confronted by the remaining Patricians, who are themselves ambushed and slaughtered by the Vitrian Dragoons, coming to the Ghosts' aid. With Dravere dead, there is no record of his orders declaring the Ghosts renegades, and the Patricians are posthumously disgraced and permanently disbanded.

Before he died, Fereyd tried to convince Gaunt that the Men of Iron could have been used to aid the Imperial forces as much as the Chaos forces. Remembering this, Major Rawne asks Gaunt why he decided to destroy them instead. Gaunt confides that the same psychic who told him the truth about his father's death also predicted his dilemma, years later, on Menazoid Epsilon, and warned him that leaving the Men of Iron intact would lead to nothing but disaster.

== Reception ==
In a review of First & Only in Black Gate, Sean Stiennon said "First and Only is primarily about infighting among the various regiments of the Guard, with the broader conflict against Chaos legions serving as the backdrop. Each regiment of the Imperial guard calls a different world home, and so they have their own cultures, their own warrior traditions, their own combat doctrines under the broad umbrella of Imperium dogma. When the Ghosts reach open battle with the elite Jantine Patricians, there's a tangible sense of the stakes — on both sides."
