= Tyrion =

Tyrion may refer to:

- Tyrion Ingram-Dawkins (born 2003), American football player

== Animals ==
- Tyrion, a California condor in the Oregon Zoo

== Fictional characters ==
- Tyrion Lannister, a character from A Song of Ice and Fire and Game of Thrones
- Tyrion, father of the title character in the animated series Tabaluga
- Tyrion, a High Elf from Warhammer Fantasy

== Other ==
- Tyrian purple, a biological pigment
