= Archaon =

Fictional character from Warhammer Fantasy Battle

Archaon, also known as Archaon the Everchosen, is a fictional character in the Warhammer franchise, leader of the forces of Chaos, and one of the primary antagonists in multiple settings and media owned by Games Workshop. He is considered one of the most powerful characters in the Warhammer multiverse, having brought about the fabled End Times, and is a major antagonist in Warhammer Fantasy Battle, Warhammer Age of Sigmar, Total War: Warhammer, and Total War: Warhammer II.

== Appearances ==
=== Warhammer Fantasy Battle ===
Archaon was responsible for bringing about the End Times, a cataclysmic event which led to the destruction of the Old World and essentially led to the shutting down of Games Workshop's original Warhammer Fantasy setting and the ushering in of the new Age of Sigmar setting in 2015. In order to usher in this world-ending event, Archaon had to gather magical artifacts in the name of the Chaos gods, earning the title 'Everchosen' while doing so. Archaon's actions also led to the rise of the High Elf leader Teclis.

=== Age of Sigmar ===
In the Age of Sigmar, Archaon is one of the primary antagonists of the entire game, on the same level as the Chaos gods themselves. He is allied with - and outranked by - four out of the five gods, outranking everyone else in the Grand Alliance of Chaos. Though Archaon once led armies of Skaven alongside his human warriors, he no longer does so due to his dislike of them, despite their membership in the Grand Alliance. His control of the forces of Chaos was later challenged by the archdaemon Be'lakor. Having overseen the ceremony to crown Archaon in the first place, Be'lakor found the mortal's promotion to be humiliating.

In the standard Age of Sigmar miniature wargame, Archaon is a very powerful unit whose army-level abilities, when supported by his followers known as the Slaves to Darkness, focus mostly on further empowering him. In the skirmish edition of the game Warcry, both the Untamed Beasts and Corvus Cabal war parties fight for the sake of gaining his favor.

=== Total War: Warhammer ===
In Warhammer's first installment of the Total War series, Archaon is both a major antagonist in the overall narrative as well as a playable character. Within the Chaos faction, he's one of three available leaders, functioning as a melee fighter with access to fire-based spells. The Chaos army, when led by Archaon, starts the game with standard Chaos Warriors, Chaos Warriors wielding halberds, and special Chosen infantry wielding two-handed weapons. Unless the player chooses Archaon as their army leader, then the primary objective of the game regardless of faction is to defeat him. Increasing invasions of all provinces by Chaos armies eventually results in a grand appearance by Archaon.

Initially, Creative Assembly wouldn't confirm or deny whether Chaos would be a playable faction at all. Eventually, Chaos was revealed as playable and with Archaon as a playable leader of the faction but for a price as paid downloadable content. In another paid DLC, players of the Norsca faction have the option to either join Archaon's Chaos warband or to challenge him for supremacy. An update late in the game's patch history reduced Archaon's diplomatic relations with all factions, an act which video game journalist Andrew Newton described as "fitting."

=== Total War: Warhammer 2 ===
Like the first installment in the series, the primary objective for players of the second is to defeat Archaon unless playing as him. Non-Chaos players are given the chance to defeat Archaon in a large final battle during the Mortal Empires DLC campaign. When equipped with a magic weapon called the Sword of Khaine, Archaon becomes particularly difficult to defeat even by another player's massed army units. In addition, a separate army general, Ghoritch, was transformed from a leader in the Chaos faction to one in the Skaven faction after being banished to hell by Archaon.

== Design ==
The character's fictional biography is violent and thematically marked by a fall from grace. Archaon was the product of pregnancy from rape, his mother suffered maternal death thereafter, his father rejected and abandoned him on the steps of a church, and he attempted suicide in order to prevent the prophecy that he'd become a world-ending villain. In the Warhammer franchise's narrative, Archaon is described as a former templar of the civilized Empire of Sigmar before his turn to evil. Writer-actor Clint Lienau noted Archaon's possible inspiration springing from J. R. R. Tolkien's Sauron.

In 2015, Archaon's model for the Warhammer miniatures series was given an updated visual aesthetic for the Age of Sigmar, including a new mount, a mutated dragon named Dorghar, with three heads representing three of the four Chaos gods. The model is noticeably large, contains a high number of separate parts for assembly, and functions as a centerpiece model for an army.

== Reception ==
Archaon's portrayal has attracted considerable praise within the gaming community. James Whitbrook of Gizmodo referred to Archaon as the third "most ridiculous badass" of the original Warhammer Fantasy tabletop miniature game, noting that he became the most powerful and evil character not once, but twice. Matthew Pedersen of Gamers Decide ranked Archaon as the top legendary lord playable in Total War: Wahammer and noted him as the clear antagonist of the game's narrative, and Sid Natividad of The Gamer ranked Archaon in the number one spot for playable lords in the second iteration of the game, Total War: Warhammer II, noting him as "too angry to die." Tyler M. of Mengel Miniatures regarded Archaon's backstory, as portrayed in the Black Library novelizations, as tragic due to the circumstances which led the character to become evil.

The character has been compared to historical figures signifying warlike behavior. Archaon's grand appearance in Total War: Warhammer was compared by Richard Scott-Jones of PCGamesN to the grand arrival of Attila the Hun in Total War: Attila. University of Jena staff member Franz Klug compared Archaon to the second of the Four Horsemen of the Apocalypse, War, as well as the Antichrist as described in the First Epistle of John.

Criticisms of both Archaon's portrayal in the novels as well as the creative direction of Black Library's handling of it have also been made. Alex Lucard, writing for Diehard GameFAN, referred to Archaon as a "roided-up Marty Stu" in his review of the Archaon entry in Games Workshop's End Times series of novels. Lucard later referred to Archaon as the "lamest character" in Warhammer and lamented what he viewed as poor creative direction in Archaon killing Nagash, the lord of the undead in the original Warhammer Fantasy, in order to promote Archaon as the new big bad in the franchise.
