= Gaunt's Ghosts =

Series of Warhammer 40,000 novels by Dan Abnett

- Covers for the three omnibus collections
- Author: Dan Abnett
- Country: United Kingdom
- Language: English
- Genre: Science fiction
- Publisher: Games Workshop
- Published: 1999 – December 2022
- Media type: Print
- No. of books: 16

Gaunt's Ghosts is a series of military science fiction novels by Dan Abnett, set in the Warhammer 40,000 universe. It was inspired by the Sharpe series of books written by Bernard Cornwell.

As of 2019, the series spans 16 novels which document the efforts of the Tanith First, a highly skilled yet unappreciated light infantry regiment of the Imperial Guard, during the Sabbat Worlds Crusade. The protagonist is Colonel-Commissar Ibram Gaunt, one of the few political commissars of the Imperium to be officially awarded command of a regiment.

Although Gaunt is the primary character, the perspective from which the novels are told shifts regularly to encompass a wider view of events – it is usually told from the Imperial point of view, though the perspective is occasionally seen through the eyes of antagonists. Elements of the series later reappeared in other series by Abnett, including the Eisenhorn and Ravenor trilogies, and has resulted in two spin-off novels, Double Eagle and Titanicus.

The series began as a continuing set of loosely connected short stories in the Black Library magazine Inferno! (issues 4, 8, and 30). The next short piece, entitled "Vermilion Level", was written out to novel length as First and Only and published as the Black Library's first original novel (the book line up until that point consisting of reprints of novels from the pre-Black Library days and anthologies of short fiction taken from Inferno! magazine). The original short pieces subsequently appeared as flashback-chapters in Ghostmaker, the second book.

There are also ancillary novels devoted to minor characters in the main series and a mock "historical book" about the war in which the books take place, as well as merchandise such as badges, T-shirts, and special editions of the books themselves.

== Publication history ==
The novels fall into a series of four-story arcs, of which three have been completed while publication of the last is still ongoing.

- The Founding (omnibus, 1008 pages, October 2003, ISBN 1-84416-066-1, 768 pages, May 2006, ISBN 1-84416-369-5, 2020, ISBN 9781784966171):
  - First and Only, originally published 1999 – ISBN 1-84416-164-1
  - Ghostmaker, originally published 2000 – ISBN 0-671-78410-2
  - Necropolis, originally published 2000 – ISBN 0-7434-1159-5
- The Saint (omnibus, hardcover, October 2004, ISBN 1-84416-125-0, paperback, 1027 pages, August 2007, ISBN 1-84416-479-9, 2020, ISBN 9781784966270)
  - Honour Guard, originally published 2001 – ISBN 1-84154-151-6
  - The Guns of Tanith, originally published 2002 – ISBN 1-84154-232-6
  - Straight Silver, originally published 2002 – ISBN 1-84154-262-8
  - Sabbat Martyr, originally published 2003 – ISBN 0-7434-4360-8
- The Lost (omnibus, paperback, 1024 pages, March 2010, ISBN 1-84416-819-0, 2020, ISBN 9781784966744)
  - Traitor General, originally published 2004 – ISBN 1-84416-113-7
  - His Last Command, originally published 2005 – ISBN 1-84416-238-9
  - The Armour of Contempt, originally published 2006 – ISBN 1-84416-400-4
  - Only in Death, originally published 2008 – ISBN 1-84416-428-4
  - The Iron Star, originally published 2008 – ISBN 978-1-84416-716-6 (not included in ISBN 978-1-84416-819-4)
- The Victory, Part 1 (omnibus, paperback, 960 pages, November 2018, ISBN 1-78496-815-3, 2019, ISBN 9781784968151)
  - Blood Pact, originally published 2009 – ISBN 978-1-84416-692-3
  - Salvation's Reach, originally published 2011 – ISBN 978-1-84416-820-0
- The Victory, Part 2 (omnibus, paperback, 800 pages, December 2022, ISBN 9781804070789)
  - The Warmaster, originally published 2017 – ISBN 1-84970-530-5
  - Anarch, originally published 2019 – ISBN 1-78496-851-X

After November 2002, the first five novels (from First and Only to The Guns of Tanith) were reprinted with new cover art by Adrian Smith; Smith has since drawn every cover illustration to date, with the exception of The Iron Star which used a stock image of the Tanith regimental badge. Previously, cover artwork had been created by a variety of artists.

The Founding and Saint story arcs have been released as hardcover omnibus editions, with paperback editions which were released in February and August 2007 respectively. The publication of The Iron Star took the form of a 1,200-copy limited edition novelette which was only available for purchase at the 2008 UK Games Day and the 2009 Games Day in Germany.

A prequel novel, titled The Vincula Insurgency, was released in June 2022.

== Synopsis ==
The series follows the exploits of Colonel-Commissar Ibram Gaunt and his regiment of scouts and recon specialists, the Tanith First-and-Only (nicknamed Gaunt's Ghosts), as they serve in the Sabbat Worlds Crusade. Their battles are normally against the forces of Chaos, although they briefly face orks on Typhon Eight. Up until Guns of Tanith the Ghosts are mainly pitted against heretical rebels armies, but on Phantine and in most of the campaigns following it they face the well-trained and elite Blood Pact. By the end of Only in Death, the Ghosts have been serving in the Crusade for roughly twelve years. Each novel begins with an extract from a fictional book called A History of the Later Imperial Crusades, which briefly explains the situation in which the Ghosts have been deployed. These extracts are written in a past tense, implying that they were written after the Sabbat Worlds Crusade ends, and do not normally refer specifically to the Tanith First.

=== First and Only ===
First and Only cover.

First and Only is the first novel in the series (and, in fact, was Abnett's first published novel), introducing Gaunt, his regiment, and the Sabbat Worlds Crusade. While deployed in the theatres of Fortis Binary and Menazoid Epsilon, the Ghosts become embroiled in a plot by an ambitious general officer to supplant Warmaster Macaroth as supreme commander of the Crusade force.

=== Ghostmaker ===
Ghostmaker cover

Ghostmaker is a collection of short stories originally printed in the short fiction magazine Inferno!, published by the Black Library. Through a series of vignettes, Abnett details the fall of Tanith and the founding of the Ghosts, followed by particular episodes focusing on the lives of some of the noteworthy members of the Ghosts, including Gaunt, Col. Colm Corbec, Maj. Elim Rawne, Sgt. Ceglan Varl, and Privates Larkin, Caffran, and Milo. The book also establishes the Ghosts' rivalry with the "Royal Volpone" guard regiment and their commanding officer, Colonel (later General) Sturm, which plays out in the subsequent novel Necropolis. After the fall of Tanith, the book is focused on four main theatres of operation:

==== Voltis City, Voltemond ====
Voltemond is described in Ghostmaker as a temperate world, similar to Earth, with extensive marshlands around Voltis City, the planetary capital, which was under Chaos control before the events of Ghostmaker. The chapter begins with the Tanith First "Gaunt's Ghosts" saving the Ketzok 17th "Serpents" artillery regiment from an ambush by Chaos Space Marines. The Tanith are then ordered to infiltrate and assault the main water-gate and sanitation outfall of Voltis to mine the walls and form a breach for an assault by the Royal Volpone 50th storm troopers, known as the "Bluebloods". The assault on the water-gate is repelled when the traitors open the floodgates and flush the Tanith out; however, Sergeant Cluggan leads a successful attack on the sanitation outfalls, creating a breach for the armoured assault. As the Ghosts withdraw, General Noches Sturm of the Royal Volpone and his adjutant, Major Gilbear, both of whom were disdainful of Gaunt and his "low-born" soldiers, order the Ketzok to bombard the Tanith as they fall back to their base. Three hundred men, including Sergeant Cluggan, are killed and another two hundred wounded. Gaunt almost faces a court-martial when he punches Colonel Ortiz, the Ketzok commander, but is let off when Ortiz claims that his injuries were caused by his Basilisk artillery vehicle's recoil. He proceeds to level a threat at General Sturm.

==== Fortis Binary ====
Fortis Binary is described as a forge-world, a planet-wide factory that fell to Chaos. First and Only describes how the Ghosts manage to sabotage a Chaos ritual after Lord Militant General Hechtor Dravere orders them on a suicidal attack on an enemy trench line. This marks the first demonstration of the hatred that Colonel Draker Flense, the commander of the Jantine Patricians who suggested that Dravere give the assault order, has for Colonel-Commissar Gaunt.

==== Menazoid Epsilon ====
A death world on the edge of the Menazoid Clasp, Epsilon was the site of three shrines to Chaos, designated Primaris, Secundus and Tertius by Imperial tacticians. Beneath Shrine Target Primaris was a Standard Template Constructor, a relic from over ten millennia before the events of First and Only, which made Iron Men, a pattern of robotic warriors; the traitorous General Dravere, assisted by the mutated, radical Inquisitor Heldane, Colonel Draker Flense and his Jantine Patricians attempted to seize power and overturn the commander of the Sabbat Worlds Crusade, Warmaster Macaroth, using the Iron Men. However, the machine was corrupted by Chaos and Commissar Gaunt destroyed it, despite the psychic puppetry of the Inquisitor, who died after his "instrument" – Imperial Agent Fereyd, the man into whom Heldane had extended his consciousness – was explosively killed. Colonel Flense also attempted to get his revenge on Gaunt and the Ghosts, as Gaunt had field-executed Flense's father, General Aldo Dercius, many years previously. The Jantine shock troops annihilated the Tanith Seventh platoon commanded by Sergeant Blane, but were themselves killed to a man by Gaunt's allies, the Vitrian Dragoons. Gaunt stabbed Flense to death beneath Target Primaris, before escaping along with his men.

==== Monthax ====
The jungle world of Monthax is the setting for the end of Ghostmaker, when Gaunt and his men encounter the alien Eldar as they struggle to wipe out a Chaos infestation. The Ghosts have to co-operate once again with the Royal Volpone 50th, and with an inquisitor who had accused Brin Milo of witchcraft. They discover an ancient portal leading to one of the Eldar's craftworlds, self-sustaining cities in space, which the inquisitor, Lilith Abferquan, closes after the alien Farseer guarding the portal dies. At the end of this battle, the Ghosts lost an excellent leader, Sergeant Lerod.

Aside from these battles, Ghostmaker is interspersed with short stories (originally published in Inferno!) in other war zones such as Blackshard, Caligula and Oskray Hive which are used to develop individual characters; for example, the character and leadership qualities of Dermon Caffran are displayed in his actions at Oskray Hive, where he commands an infiltration force which causes the fall of the enemy stronghold, and continue to be exhibited upon his promotion to Sergeant in His Last Command.

=== Necropolis ===
The beginning of the novel is told from many perspectives – ranging from the rich nobility to low-class civilians – and tells of the opening phases of the siege on Vervunhive. The mega-city's neighbouring hive, Ferrozoica, amasses an army and marches on their former rival with an unknown agenda. The Vervun Primary militia prepares to repel the invasion forces, but as Vervunhive's High Master refuses to believe that Ferrozoica has mobilised against them, they are not given permission to arm their defence batteries before the Zoicans fire the opening salvos. Much of Vervunhive is plunged into panic and thousands perish in the first few days, and aid from the Imperial Guard is called for.

The Tanith First-and-Only is deployed as part of the reinforcement army sent by Warmaster Macaroth. They learn that Ferrozoica, whom Vervunhive had fought in the Trade War ninety years before, had silenced communications with its neighbours in recent months and began arming. The influence of Chaos is evident. Colonel-Commissar Gaunt and his Ghosts face opposition from not only the enemy, but also their fellow Guard regiments and the local politicians.

Necropolis is a significant point in the series; at the end of the novel, the under-strength Tanith First receives an influx of replacement soldiers from the militia and general populace of Vervunhive. A number of major characters are introduced in the novel. A short story titled In Remembrance directly follows the siege of Vervunhive, and is included in The Founding (the first Omnibus).

=== Honour Guard ===
The Ghosts are sent to the Shrineworld Hagia, religious capital of the Sabbat worlds and homeworld of the revered Saint Sabbat herself, to reclaim the holy world from the clutches of Pater Sin and his so-called Infardi. During their campaign to reclaim the Doctrinopolis – the planet's central city – Gaunt, who has command of the ground forces, is forced into a trap set in one of the most holy structures in the city. A warp-beacon is activated in the process, and a Chaos fleet advances on Hagia to obliterate the Imperial forces.

With just eighteen days until the fleet (large enough to wipe out the liberation force even if the fleet were a quarter its current size) arrives, Gaunt is given one last chance to redeem himself by the arrogant and pompous Lord-General Lugo: recover the Saint's remains and holy relics from the Shrinehold in the Sacred Hills for evacuation. The Ghosts are appointed as the honour guard of these relics, and together with units from the Pardus armoured regiments they form a convoy and journey into the mountains. However, much of Sin's Infardi horde has pulled back into the hills; leaving the Ghosts with no choice but to fight the heretics while at the same time fighting the elements and navigating the unfamiliar terrain.

Honour Guard introduces new characters who become central figures in the Tanith First, as well as those who play a key role throughout the Saint arc, such as Commissar Viktor Hark, Ayatani Zweil, Lijah Cuu and Pater Sin. It also features spectacular armour clashes and reveals more of Gaunt's character.

=== The Guns of Tanith ===
The novel begins with the Tanith First training to take part in the airborne assault on Cirenholm, a dome-city perched above Phantine's toxic Scald. The archenemy's elite Blood Pact have captured the city, which the Imperial forces plan to use as a staging ground for their campaign to reclaim Ouranberg, one of Phantine's largest cities and a major source of promethium. After the Ghosts successfully infiltrate the Blood Pact's defences and prevent a disastrous loss for the Imperium, Lord-General Van Voytz re-considers his approach on the Ouranberg invasion.

A number of Ghosts are hand-picked to form specialist kill-teams, placed in a regime of additional jump-training and covertly deployed into Ouranberg prior to the invasion. Codenamed Operation Larisel, their mission is to kill Sagittar Slaith; the Chaos commander of the Blood Pact holding Ouranberg. Doing so will break the morale of the Chaos worshippers and enable the Imperial forces to recapture Ouranberg with greater ease. The task is made more daunting with the prospect of thousands of Blood Pact troopers and loxatl mercenaries standing between them and their target. However, the rest of the Tanith First face their own trials as they await deployment; a great unease is brewing between the Tanith and the Verghastite soldiers, and a crime case involving several Ghosts highlights this divide.

The Phantine XX Fighter Corps introduced in The Guns of Tanith appear in a spin-off novel – titled Double Eagle, also by Dan Abnett.

=== Straight Silver ===
Still under the command of Van Voytz, the Tanith First is deployed as part of the Imperial Expeditionary Force to Aexe Cardinal, where a deadlocked land war has been raging for forty years between the Aexe Alliance (a handful of loyal nation-states) and the Chaos-corrupted Shadik Republic. Warmaster Macaroth insists that the Aexe Alliance is to remain in command of the campaign, with strained success. The Alliance employs methods of warfare considered obsolete and inefficient according to the modern standard tactics of the Imperial Guard.

Gaunt is quickly frustrated with the brutal strategies and lack of reliable intelligence, and disagrees with the deployment of the scout-specialist Ghosts as grunts in the trenches. Van Voytz and Count Golke – the Alliance/Imperial liaison – negotiate with Alliance Command and agree to a compromise: one half of the Tanith First is sent to the northern Montorq forests to scout the area, while the other is redeployed to the Seiberq Pocket – the most dangerous section of the war zone – where they are tasked with infiltrating the Shadik lines and destroying the enemy's newly developed siege guns.

Straight Silver is the first novel in which the Tanith First does not see a campaign through to its conclusion: after successfully taking out the siege-guns in the Seiberq Pocket and repelling a Blood Pact flanking manoeuvre in the Montorq Forest, the Ghosts are withdrawn from the front lines and redeployed to Herodor.

=== Sabbat Martyr ===
At the request of the reincarnated Saint Sabbat, the Tanith First-and-Only is summoned to the remote and tactically insignificant world Herodor. The Civitas Beati, a holy city dedicated to the Saint, is under assault from a legion of Blood Pact, led by Enok Innokenti. While the Ghosts prepare to defend the city alongside the local Planetary Defence Force (PDF), Gaunt learns the truth of the situation: the woman posing as the reincarnated Saint is Sanian, an esholi whom the Ghosts encountered on Hagia. Utterly convinced that she is Sabbat, Sanian has clearly lost her mind. Lord-General Lugo – whose career has been unstable since his disgrace at Hagia – plans to use her as propaganda, and does not care that she is an imposter; he believes that he will be forever remembered as the man responsible for a miracle in the Sabbat Worlds. As far as untold thousands of pilgrims, Imperial and archenemy troops are concerned, Sanian is the true Saint.

However, things take a strange turn when Sanian actually does become the host for the Saint's spirit, after Sabbat's true incarnation perishes in the assault. Innokenti deploys nine specialist assassins to the Civitas Beati under the cover of the invasion. Their purpose: kill the Saint and shatter the morale of the Imperials. With the Imperial fleet all but destroyed and surrounded by an enemy who has multiple advantages over them, the Ghosts face one of their most daunting challenges yet.

The title Sabbat Martyr is a reference to the psychic message experienced by a number of Ghosts in Honour Guard. Ultimately, it is one of the Ghost's most beloved leaders who becomes a martyr in Sabbat's name, as he gives his life defending her from the final assassin.

=== Traitor General ===
Lord-General Noches Sturm, the disgraced senior officer relieved of command during the siege on Vervunhive when caught attempting to desert, is captured by the forces of Chaos while en route to a military tribunal. His memories are bound by a mind-lock, preventing him from revealing vital information about the Crusade. As enemy psykers work hard to remove the mind-lock, the Imperial forces move quickly to stop Sturm jeopardising the entire Sabbat Worlds Crusade.

By request of Van Voytz and on his own free will, Colonel-Commissar Gaunt leads a hand-picked team of Ghosts to Gereon; a Chaos-held world where Sturm is undergoing an agonising ordeal to recover his memory. The insertion team is tasked with killing Sturm to prevent him from yielding critical intelligence that would endanger the Crusade war effort. The group links up with the loyalist resistance on Gereon to locate Sturm and evade the heretical forces pursuing them. With countless fanatical soldiers and foul warp-beings standing between the rescue team and their target, Gaunt and his men must not only fight for their lives, but also resist the corruption of Chaos that threatens to overwhelm them.

Traitor General introduces Eszrah ap Niht, a partisan of the Gereon Untill. From this novel on, Eszrah becomes a major character within the series. It is also the first appearance of Mabbon Etogaur, a former commander in the Blood Pact who returns in the Victory arc.

=== His Last Command ===
After sixteen months of fighting as part of the Gereon Resistance, Colonel-Commissar Gaunt and his team escape the Chaos-held world and return to Imperial territory. Instead of praise and acknowledgement of their actions, the Ghosts are met with deep mistrust and abuse. Saved from execution in Camp Xeno on Ancreon Sextus by Junior Commissar Nahum Ludd, Gaunt and the Ghosts are briefly re-united with Lord-General Van Voytz before facing trial by the Commissariat. However, halfway through the hearings all charges are dropped and the Ghosts are prepared to return to active duty. Gaunt is shocked to learn that the Tanith First has been disbanded and merged with an under-strength regiment; the 81st Belladon. Furthermore, Gaunt is relieved of command status and once again a simple field commissar, but separated from his men.

The Ghosts are sent to join the 81st/1st Recon – the merged 81st Belladon and the Tanith First, led by Colonel Lucian Wilder. The regiment is taking part in the campaign to capture the ancient step-city Sparshad Mons, occupied by the Blood Pact and disturbingly warped nocturnal predators. The situation in the Mons is grim; desertion is high, morale is low, and most of the Imperial soldiers are inexperienced grunts. Gaunt is deployed to another section of the step-city and attached to a regiment from Fortis Binary, accompanied by Ludd and Eszrah Night. The situation deteriorates rapidly as the Blood Pact launch a counter-assault against the Imperial forces.

His Last Command introduces troopers from the 81st Belladon, several of whom become key characters in the series. The title refers to both Gaunt and Wilder. When informing Gaunt of his demotion, Van Voytz tells him that the Tanith was "[his] last command". Wilder issues his last command to a platoon of Belladon soldiers participating in a suicidal rearguard for the rest of the regiment, of which Gaunt assumes leadership.

=== The Armour of Contempt ===
The Fifth Crusade Army, led by Lord-General Van Voytz, finally advances to reclaim Gereon from the forces of Chaos after over two thousand days of brutal occupation. The majority of the Crusade force is deployed to assault the coastline fortifications known as K'ethdrac'tt Shet Magir, an action which the newly inducted Dalin Criid participates in as part of an RIP (Retraining, Indoctrination and Punishment) detail. Half of the novel follows Dalin's experiences in basic training and his struggle to survive in the chaos of the battlefield.

The recently re-instated Tanith First is excluded from this part of the invasion and is one of a number of scout/recon regiments inserted deep into the mainland behind enemy lines. As the Ghosts liberate a country town called Cantible, Gaunt is ordered by the Commissariat to make contact with the loyalist resistance in the Gereon Untill, and leads a small team out into the wilderness to do so. However, it becomes apparent that certain individuals have their own agenda for re-taking Gereon.

The storyline of The Armour of Contempt shifts at regular intervals, between the perspectives of Dalin Criid and the rest of the Ghosts. The novel draws its name from a fictional book called The Spheres of Longing written by Inquisitor Gideon Ravenor, the main character of another series written by Dan Abnett.

=== Only in Death ===
On the fortress-world Jago, Lord-General Van Voytz addresses the Tanith First personally. He 'asks' the Ghosts to secure an empty stronghold to the east of Elikon, the central Imperial bastion on the planet. It is clear from the start that Gaunt resents these orders. After six days of marching through Jago's desert-like terrain and enduring dust-storms, the Ghosts reach their objective: Hinzerhaus, dubbed the house at the end of the world.

As they attempt to secure the fortress, the Ghosts make numerous discoveries. There is no water source on site, the maps that they have been given of Hinzerhaus are inconsistent and incorrect, and strange echoes fill the halls. Many of the men become convinced that the place is haunted. These findings only cause more issues when the Blood Pact attempt to storm Hinzerhaus, and the Ghosts are forced to mount a defence against a superior foe. At the same time, strange apparitions begin to eat away at the courage and morale of the men...

The title of the novel is part of an old Imperial proverb; only in death does duty end. The beginning of each chapter opens with an extract from Commissar Viktor Hark's field journal, which is written in a font which resembles handwriting. This style changes slightly at points when Nahum Ludd scribes on Hark's behalf. The novel re-introduces Agun Soric, who was absent from the previous books in the 'Lost' arc.

=== The Iron Star ===
The Iron Star is a short story released as a chapbook. The story forms a coda to Only in Death. It recounts Gaunt's own mentally internalised struggle to survive after being severely wounded in the events of the previous novel; moments of spiritual communion also establish portents for his future. Only 1200 copies were printed for the release date in September 2008, but it has since been included in the Sabbat Worlds anthology, a background book of short stories, edited by Dan Abnett.

=== Blood Pact ===
After the gruelling events on Jago, the Tanith First is removed from active service for the first time since its founding and sent to Balhaut to perform garrison duties. Two years on, however, the Ghosts are becoming restless from the lack of combat and purpose. A number of them go as far as turning to petty crime and other bad habits to amuse themselves. Ibram Gaunt himself becomes increasingly idle and distracted, but remains confident that the Tanith First will return to the front again soon.

Events turn as Gaunt is summoned to Balhaut's Commissariat headquarters. A senior officer of the arch-enemy has been captured, and refuses to speak to anyone but Gaunt. The Inquisition is attempting to secure custody of the prisoner so that they may handle him their own way. The prisoner insists that he wishes to help the Imperium, but this claim is met with speculation by Gaunt. However, he is forced to protect the prisoner and go to ground in the city when a Blood Pact insertion team storms the facility in an attempt to silence the prisoner. With heretical witchcraft influencing the populace and a determined hunter pursuing them, who can Gaunt turn to for aid? And what information does the traitor general know that prompts the enemy to openly assault an Imperial stronghold?

The plot of Blood Pact somewhat mirrors that of Traitor General, with Etogaur Mabbon in place of Noches Sturm, but differs with the assassination squad holding the upper hand over their target's captors. The novel also provides greater detail of Gaunt's past tour on Balhaut during his service with the Hyrkan 8th, before the founding of the Tanith First-and-Only.

=== Salvation's Reach ===
Following the events of Blood Pact, Colonel-Commissar Gaunt and his Ghosts are returned to active duty, and are given one of their most formidable assignments yet; a mysterious space hulk known as Salvation's Reach. According to the turncoat Mabbon Etogaur, the Sons of Sek, a breakaway faction within the Blood Pact commanded by the warlord Anakwanar Sek, have secretly been using Salvation's Reach as an R&D installation; concealing their activities there from all factions, even their overlord, Archon Gaur.

If Sek's covert operations are brought to light, it will shatter the uneasy alliance between Sek and Gaur, sparking an internal feud that will tip the balance of the Sabbat Worlds Crusade in the favour of the Imperium. The Tanith First – reinforced with additional troops drawn from Verghast and Belladon – and a trio of veteran Space Marines are sent to neutralise the facility at Salvation's Reach and gather as much intelligence as possible before they destroy it. However, Gaunt must also see to the protection of the incarcerated Mabbon, deal with the malcontents within the Tanith First, and cope with personal issues that he never anticipated.

A sub-plot in Salvation's Reach follows Doc Dorden's battle against terminal cancer, and his determination to serve the Tanith First until the very end. Another sub-plot explores the relationship between Captain Ban Daur and his new partner, Elodie. Through the latter, readers are granted an insight into the lives of the wives and other civilians that follow Imperial Guard regiments around the galaxy. The novel also features the appearance of Brother Kater Holofurnace of the Iron Snakes, a Chapter of Space Marines that previously appeared in Abnett's novel, Brotherhood of the Snake.

=== The Warmaster ===
After their mission to Salvation's Reach, Colonel-Commissar Gaunt and the Tanith First travel to Urdesh, a forge world besieged by the armies of Anarch Sek. The Imperial forces attempt to divide and conquer their enemy, while Warmaster Macaroth commands the Urdesh campaign. The Archenemy assault may instead aim to decapitate the Imperial command structure by killing Macaroth, leaving Gaunt's Ghosts to defend him against the assembled forces of Chaos.

=== Anarch ===
On the world of Urdesh, the massed forces of the Imperial Crusade engage in a final battle with the Archenemy commander known as the Anarch, and his elite warriors - the barbaric Sons of Sek. A victory for either side will decide more than just the fate of Urdesh... it will determine the outcome of the entire Sabbat Worlds Crusade. Ibram Gaunt – now serving at the right hand of Warmaster Macaroth – finds himself at the heart of the struggle. His regiment, the Tanith First "Ghosts", holds the key to success. But as the forces of the Imperium and Chaos square up for the final confrontation, Gaunt discovers that the threat may come from inside.

== Anthologies and short stories ==
Dan Abnett and various other Black Library authors have released Sabbat World Crusade short stories. Some stories are about Gaunt's Ghosts and the rest are other Sabbat Worlds stories. There are currently 2 anthologies as well as 3 short stories that have not yet been collected into an omnibus or anthology.

- Dan Abnett., ed. (2010). Sabbat Worlds. Nottingham: Black Library. ISBN 978-1-84970-010-8.
- Dan Abnett., ed. (2014). Sabbat Crusade. Nottingham: Black Library. ISBN 978-1-84970-954-5.
- Dan Abnett., ed. (2021). Sabbat War. Nottingham. Black Library. ISBN 1800260288
  - Vermilion Level, 2013 – ISBN 978-1-78251-130-4 (An alternate version of the story in the First and Only novel.)
  - Forgotten, 2014 – ISBN 978-1-78251-832-7
  - Midnight Rotation, 2015 – ISBN 978-1-78572-031-4 (Released as part of an unrelated series titled Call of Chaos.)

== Spin-off titles ==
Dan Abnett has also authored three other titles that share the setting of the Sabbat Worlds Crusade. The first is Double Eagle, focusing on the Phantine Air Corps introduced in The Guns of Tanith and set in the same immediate timeframe as Sabbat Martyr. The second is a fictional history of the Crusade, from the beginnings of the crusade 10 years before the setting of the first novel to a point just after Sabbat Martyr, providing an overview of the crusade as a whole. Most recently published is Titanicus, detailing a Titan Legion's struggles against Chaos invaders and internal schism alike on the Forge World of Orestes. Although not linked with the Sabbat crusade, a man from Tanith features briefly.

- Dan Abnett. (2005). Double Eagle. Nottingham: Black Library. ISBN 1-84416-090-4.
- Dan Abnett. (2005). The Sabbat Worlds Crusade. Nottingham: Black Library. ISBN 1-84416-249-4.
- Dan Abnett. (2008). Titanicus. Nottingham: Black Library. ISBN 978-1-84416-661-9.

A sequel to Double Eagle, titled Interceptor City, has also been published:

- Dan Abnett. (2025) Interceptor City. Nottingham: Black Library. ISBN 978-1836091981

Two other spin-off novels have also been planned. The first is Urdesh: The Serpent and the Saint by Matthew Farrer, focusing on the Iron Snakes and continuing the Sabbat Worlds saga on Urdesh. The second is Volpone Glory by Nick Kyme, focusing on the Volpone Bluebloods on Gnostes.

== See also ==
- List of Warhammer 40,000 novels

== Notes ==
- Abnett, Dan (2000). First and Only. Nottingham: Black Library. ISBN 1-84416-164-1.
- Chambers, Andy; Haines, Pete; Hoare, Andy (2003). Warhammer 40,000 Codex: Imperial Guard (4th ed.). Nottingham: Games Workshop. ISBN 1-84154-410-8.
