= List of Warhammer Fantasy characters =

This is a list of many important or pivotal fictional figures in the history of the Warhammer Fantasy universe.

These characters have appeared in the games set in the Warhammer world, the text accompanying various games and games material, novels by Games Workshop and later Black Library and other publications based on the Warhammer setting by other publishers.

Some have been produced as models^{m}, others have appeared only in text.

== High Elves (Asur) ==
- Aenarion the Defender - The first Phoenix King, whose skills were unrivalled amongst other mortals or immortals. He was granted incredible abilities by his gods to combat the first Great Chaos Incursion. Perished alongside his dragon Indraugnir, after slaying four Greater Daemons while defending the creation of the Great Vortex.
- Astarielle - First (recorded) Everqueen and first wife of Aenarion. Killed during the Great Catastrophe.
- Caledor the Dragontamer - The greatest elven mage ever to have lived and the creator of the Great Vortex. Forged many powerful weapons and artifacts to combat Chaos during the Great Catastrophe.
- Alarielle^{m} the Radiant - Current Everqueen of Avelorn and spiritual leader of the High Elves.
- Alith Anar^{m} - Known as the Shadow King of Nagarythe. Alith Anar is the ruler of the Shadow Warriors.
- Eltharion^{m} the Grim - A Swordmaster, the Prince of Yvresse and the Warden of Tor Yvresse.
- Asarnil^{m} the Dragonlord- An exiled prince and Dog of War, who rides the green dragon Deathfang.
- Finubar the Seafarer - the eleventh and current Phoenix King of the High Elves.
- Imrik^{m} - Ruling Prince of the kingdom of Caledor, Imrik is a direct descendant of Caledor Dragontamer.
- Selafyn of the Annulii^{m}, - Limited edition figure, A Warden of the Annulii and part of the Storm of Chaos event.
- Teclis^{m} - Most powerful wizard in this age of the world. Founder of the Colleges of Magic in Altdorf. Twin brother of Tyrion.
- Tyrion^{m} - Twin brother of Teclis, and direct descendant of Aenarion through his son by Astarielle, Morelion, he is the greatest warrior of the High Elves. He is called the 'Defender of Ulthuan' and is second only to Archaon the Everchosen when it comes to strength at arms.
- Caradryan^{m} - Marked by Asuryan and Captain of the Phoenix Guard.

== Dark Elves (Druchii) ==
- Malekith^{m} - King of the Dark Elves and second son of Aenarion. Also known as the Witch King.
- Malus Darkblade^{m} - A Dark Elf Noble, possessed by the daemon Tz'arkan.
- Morathi^{m} - The first Hag Queen and sorceress of Naggaroth. Second wife of Aenarion and Mother of Malekith.
- Shadowblade^{m} - A highly skilled Dark Elf Assassin, favoured by Hellebron.
- Hellebron^{m} - Religious leader of the Dark Elves and greatest among the 'Brides of Khaine'.
- Lokhir Fellheart^{m} - an infamous captain of one of the Black Arks.
- Kouran Darkhand- captain of the Black Guard, the personal bodyguards of Malekith.
- Tullaris Dreadbringer- the captain of the Executioners, the sacred warriors of Khaine.
- Rakarth^{m} - Called the 'Beastmaster'

== Wood Elves (Asrai) ==
- Ariel^{m} - Queen of Athel Loren. Is one of the most powerful wizards in all of the Warhammer world. Ariel is a demi-goddess and the avatar of Isha.
- Araloth - Lord of Talsyn. Craven in his youth, refusing to hunt that which could hunt him, overcame his fears and slew a daemon to save his goddess.
- Drycha^{m} - A forest spirit that blames the Asrai for all of Athel Loren's woes.
- Durthu^{m} - One of the oldest treemen in Athel Loren.
- Naestra & Arahan^{m} - The mysterious Sister-twins of Athel Loren, who can command the forest.
- Orion^{m} - King of Athel Loren is a demi-god and avatar of Kurnuos. Is the terror of many Bretonnian's towns because of his "Wild Hunt".
- Scarloc - An Asrai champion who, with the aid of his men, killed Morghur with "one hundred arrows". He is considered the greatest archer alive.

Note: Both Ariel and Orion appear to be drawn from the fairy monarchs Oberon and Titania of William Shakespeare's A Midsummer Night's Dream.

== Chaos ==
- Aekold Helbrass^{m} - Once a knight of the Templar Order of the Jade Griffon, he pledged his eternal loyalty to Tzeentch.
- An'ggrath the Unbound- The most powerful Bloodthirster of Khorne, replaced Skarbrand as the Blood God's most favored minion. Noted for having a forked whip.
- Arbaal the Undefeated^{m} - Chosen champion of Khorne, he rides upon Khorne's personal hound and wields the Destroyer of Khorne, a powerful axe.
- Archaon^{m}, - The Everchosen, Lord of the End Times. Archaon led the latest invasion of the Empire in the worldwide campaign Storm of Chaos. He dueled Valten, champion of Sigmar and Luthor Huss, in battle during the Battle of Middenheim - but was then defeated by the Black Orc warlord Grimgor Ironhide and forced to quit the battlefield. These events were later retconed in the end times story to have never occurred. Archeon proceeded to lead chaos to victory leading to the end of the world and was last scene tumbling into the abyss with Sigmar. Later on he emerged alive in age of sigmar.
- Azazel, Prince of Damnation ^{m} - Gerreon is the twin brother to one of Sigmar's dearest friends. Upon this twin's death in battle, Gerreon grew to hate Sigmar, eventually betraying Sigmar, nearly killing him; Sigmar's first love Ravenna, who was also Gerreon's older sister, died by Gerreon's blade. Later ascended to Daemonhood, known as Azazel.
- Be'lakor^{m} - The Harbinger, He Who Heralds the Conquerors, The shadow master of Mordheim. The first Daemon Prince of Chaos, cursed by the god Tzeentch to crown the Everchosen.
- Crom the Conqueror^{m} - A powerful warlord, Vardek Crom is allied with Archaon. During the Storm of Chaos, Crom led his army to attack the Empire from the east while Archaon attacked from the north. Vardek Crom also defeated WAAAGH! Grimgor in the beginning of the campaign. He is believed to have been slain by the undead forces of Mannfred von Carstein whilst trying to lead his army through Sylvania to attack the Empire from the south.
- Dechala the Denied One^{m} - Once a beautiful High Elf princess, Dechala's family gave her to a Daemon Prince of Slaanesh during Aenarion's time as a sacrifice to save themselves. Driven mad by betrayed hate, Dechala sold her soul to Slaanesh for the chance to exact revenge on her family. Slaanesh accepted, and with his aid, Dechala exacted a terrible and bloody vengeance on her kinsmen. Now she is a monstrous daemonic creature, with a beautiful humanoid upper body and the repulsive lower body of a gigantic snake.
- Egrimm von Horstmann^{m}, - Von Horstmann was a wizard of the Light College who had pledged his soul to the Chaos god Tzeentch in return for increased magical power. He rose quickly through the ranks, and corrupted many of his brethren before being found out by the Light wizard Vespasian Kant. Facing the wrath of both the College of Light and the Church of Sigmar, he fled to the Chaos Wastes on the back of the twin-headed Chaos Dragon Baudros. He dwells there still, leading The Cabal, the most powerful cult of Tzeentch in the World.
- Feytor the Tainted^{m} - One of Archaon's four lieutenants. A Chaos Lord devoted to the Plague Lord Nurgle.
- Festus the Leechlord^{m} - Once the best doctor in the Imperial province of Nordland, Festus fell from grace after he sold his soul to Nurgle in exchange for knowing the cure to a disease he couldn't stop. He was left a deranged maniac, seeking only to experiment with the effect of disease on humanity.
- Galrauch^{m}, - First of the Chaos Dragons, and Father of all that monstrous breeds. Originally a mighty and noble Star Dragon who aided the High Elves in their war against Chaos, he mutated into a Chaos dragon after he slew a greater daemon of Tzeentch, which possessed him afterwards. His noble spirit still battles for control of his body and from time to time resurfaces: it is rumoured one day Galrauch will overcome the evil within him.
- Gorthor ^{m} - A Beastlord that is unafraid of killing Shamans. He has a cloak made out of the flayed hides of shamans he has slain. With his vision and skills of persuasion, Gorthor raised an immense warherd and laid waste to two whole Imperial provinces before he was finally killed.
- Ghorros Warhoof ^{m} - A powerful Centigor who has fought in thousands of battles and sired countless offspring, Ghorros is treated with respect and familial loyalty by all Beastmen. On his brow, he wears the skull of Arsil the Prince of Unicorns, a Wood Elf lord whom Ghorros murdered many years ago.
- Haargroth the Blooded One- Haargroth was a peasant boy who proved his mettle in combat, and became a Chaos Lord devoted to the Blood God Khorne and one of Archaon's four lieutenants. He was slain by Ar-Ulric Valgeir during the Battle of Middenheim.
- Harald Hammerstorm^{m} - "Harry the Hammer" is a legendary chaos warrior, roaming the Chaos Wastelands searching for more of the undead to slay. He has an eternal grudge against any of the undead. This character was on the cover of Warhammer 1st Edition.
- Khazrak the One-Eye ^{m} - Said to be the most dangerous of all the beastlords in the Drakwald Forest.
- Kholek Suneater-One of the oldest, largest and most powerful Dragon Ogre Shaggoths in existence.
- Malagor the Dark Omen^{m} Bourne aloft on feathered pinions, Malagor is viewed by mankind as an embodiment of the destruction of all civilisation, while to the Beastmen, he is the embodiment of Mankind's destruction. His mere presence inspires awe in his followers, and utter terror in his enemies.
- Morghur, Master of Skulls ^{m} - Spreads Chaos wherever he goes. His presence can cause those nearby to mutate horrendeously.
- Sigvald ^{m} - An incest spawned bastard, Sigvald murdered his father for trying to exile him after his excesses became too much to put up with. Sigvald, however, soon found a patron who not only approved of his cruel and debauched excesses, but openly rewarded him for them: Slaanesh.
- Skarbrand the Exiled One^{m} - Khorne's former favorite Bloodthirster, tricked by Tzeentch into attacking the Blood God in blind rage. After doing so the daemon was permanently banished from Khorne's forces and realm, forcing him into a mindless frenzy unable to distinguish friend from foe. Noted for being unable to fly and using two axes instead of the standard ax and whip arsenal of a typical Bloodthirster.
- Throgg^{m} - Also known as the 'Troll King', Throgg is an oddity in that he is much smarter than his trollish kin. With his superior intellect and great strength, he has made it his mission to overthrow the race of Men, and bring about a nightmare age of ice and darkness where he and his monstrous brethren will rule the world.
- U'Zuhl the Skulltaker^{m} - Is the Blood God's immortal champion, the strongest of all Khorne's Bloodletters. Appearing before enemy armies he bellows a challenge at the greatest warriors present until one of them is foolish enough to answer. When a foe emerges, Skulltaker charges forward to claim another skull in the name of the Blood God.
- Valkia the Bloody^{m} - When Queen Valkia was slain in battle, Khorne resurrected her into a form more pleasing to him. Now a twisted mix of beautiful woman and monstrous demon, Valkia fights now only to serve her diabolic paramour: Khorne himself.
- Vilitch the Curseling^{m} - The smaller and weaker of two twins, Vilitich was mercilessly beaten and abused by his elder brother, Thomin. After begging Tzeentch to reverse their fates, he awoke to find he and his brother had been fused together. Better still, he had become a sorcerer of phenomenal power, while his brother was now but a shambling automaton. Now Vilitch is master of his tribe, using his brother's strength to kill those his sorcery can't destroy - a rare occurrence indeed.
- Wulfrik the Wanderer^{m} - After arrogantly boasting that he was the equal of any warrior in this world or the next, the Chaos Gods cursed Wulfrik to spend eternity wandering the world, proving his arrogant claim.
- Ku'gath plaguefather- Ku'gath is the chosen greather demon of Nurgle. He brings plague wherever he goes and is the living embodiment of nurgle. Fell into Nurgle’s own cauldron.
- Kairos Fateweaver- Kairos is a twin headed lord of change. His right head see the future while his left sees the past. He knows about every spell in the old world and can read the past and future possibly better than tzeench himself.
- N'kari^{m} - N'kari is slanesh's champion and is always on the hunt for the greatest pleasure ever known. He also has a deep hatred for the twins of Ulthan Tyrion and Teclis

== Orcs and Goblins (Greenskins) ==
- 'Azhag the Slaughterer^{m} - Orc warlord, victor of the Battle for Butcher's Hill, he retrieved the Crown of Sorcery (created by Nagash) from a Chaos Troll's hoard.
- Borgut Facebeater^{m} - Orc warrior of the Red Eye Mountain whose fighting spirit impressed Grimgor enough to now serve directly under the warboss instead of killing him as a potential rival.
- Gorbad Ironclaw^{m} - Orc Warboss, leader of the Ironskin Tribe. He destroyed the Imperial province of Solland, taking its Elector Count's Runefang and besieged the Imperial capital, Altdorf. He is proclaimed as the greatest orc that ever lived.
- Gorfang Rotgut^{m} - Chieftain of the Orcs of Black Crag, the ancient Dwarf hold taken over by Orcs many years ago.
- Grimgor Ironhide^{m} - Black Orc Warboss, Defeated Archaon the everchosen during storm of chaos.
- Grom the Paunch^{m} - Goblin Leader, sacked the Empire and invaded Ulthuan.
- Morglum Necksnapper^{m} - Black Orc Warlord.
- Skarsnik & Gobbla^{m} - Night Goblin warlord, self-proclaimed Warlord of Karak Eight Peaks, a Dwarf hold now inhabited by dwarves, skaven and goblins who fight with each other constantly for supremacy. Gobbla is his pet squig.

== Dwarfs (Dawi) ==
- Alaric the Mad - Runesmith, perhaps the greatest to ever live, he eventually went insane after crafting the Nemesis Crown. He created the 12 Runefangs given to the Elector Counts of the Empire. Sigmar was aided several times throughout his life by a dwarf named Alaric after he rescued the Dwarven King Kurgan Ironbeard, it was Kurgan who gave him Ghal-maraz(Skull-Splitter.) Due to his habit of aiding humans, other Dwarves dubbed him 'Alaric the Mad'.
- Alrik Ranulfsson^{m} - King of Karak Hirn, even his fellow dwarfs consider him extremely dedicated to the customs and traditions of his ancestors. He rides upon his great-great-great-grandfather's shield into battle, carried by two dwarfs.
- Garagrim Ironfist^{m} - The son of Ungrim Ironfist, Garagrim had devised a plan to rid his family line of its dishonour. By dying in combat as his father's champion, Garagrim believed he would prove the worthiness of the bloodline. He was killed when a chaos giant fell on him as it died, thus fulfilling his slayer vow.
- Gotrek Gurnisson^{m} - Slayer whose exploits are chronicled in the Gotrek and Felix series of books. His companion is the human Felix Jaeger^{m}.
- Grimnir - Ancient dwarf god, who legend says carried two huge axes and wandered into the chaos wastes to do battle. He was never seen again. One of his axes now belongs to the dwarf high king Thorgrim Grudgebearer, the other reputedly belongs to Gotrek Gurnisson.
- Grombrindal, the White Dwarf^{m} - A white-bearded dwarf hero, suspected to be Snorri Whitebeard, the first High King of the Dwarfs. Taken from the emblem of White Dwarf.
- Josef Bugman^{m} - The greatest dwarf master brewer of all time, his brewery was destroyed by a band of marauding Goblins and he now wanders the world with his band of rangers hunting and killing Goblins wherever they find them.
- King Kazador - Dwarf King of Karak Azul, the last of the once wealthy southern holds to remain in Dwarf hands.
- Malakai Makaisson^{m} - Slayer Engineer. Possibly one of the most brilliant engineers alive, but also quite mad. He claims he will prove his theories or die trying. He took the slayers crest when his first experimental airship, the Indestructible, killed a score of dwarfs. During the Second Siege of Praag Malakai used his second airship, the Spirit of Grungni, to fight Chaos in two ways. First, he delivered at least 200 Slayers to help the besieged city. Second, the airship was heavily loaded with highly flammable liquids and bombs, which Malakai then dropped upon the Chaos forces massed around the city.
- Snorri Nosebiter^{m} - Slayer who is friend to Gotrek Gurnisson and aids him occasionally. Noteworthy that for his baldness making it impossible for him to have the typical Slayer mohawk, so he instead uses orange painted nails driven into his skull.
- Thorek Ironbrow^{m} - The master runelord of Karak Azul who seeks to restore lost dwarf relics. He fights his foes with his anvil of doom.
- Thorgrim Grudgebearer^{m} - Dwarf High King and King of Karaz-A-Karak as well as Keeper of the Great Book of Grudges.
- Ungrim Ironfist^{m} - Dwarf "Slayer King" and ruler of Karak Kadrin also known as the Slayer Keep.

== Bretonnia ==
- Alberic d'Bordeleaux - Alberic is the current Duke of Bordeleaux and is noted for keeping a small but well trained force as opposed to his neighboring lands.
- Armand d'Aquitaine^{m} - Armand is the Duke of Aquitaine. He only took the post after his brother died and Louen ordered him to fulfill his familial duty, as Armand preferred seeking glory as a Knight Errent.
- Bohemond Beastslayer^{m} - Bohemond is the Duke of Bastonne, and although blood decedent of Gilles le Breton, he is fiercely loyal to Louen Leoncoeur.
- Chilfroy d'Artois - Chilfroy is the Duke of Artois, and is noted for his size and grim nature.
- Fay Enchantress^{m} - The highest mage of the Bretonnian realm. Her fury is legendary. Rides a Unicorn. Although the Fay Enchantress is a Character that can be taken as part of the (Human) Bretonnian army, she is in fact a Wood Elf.
- The Green Knight^{m} - A Spectre, whether he is the spirit of Bretonnia given form, or Gilles le Breton is debated.
- Louen Leoncoeur^{m} - Current King of Bretonnia.
- Repanse de Lyonesse^{m} - Repanse was a Bretonnian Paladin before rising to the rank of Duchess of Lyonesse. She earned her rank due to her assault against a chaos invasion in the land.
- Roland le Marechal^{m} - Roland is the captain in charge of defending Couronne's eastern frontier, a swamp-filled land between Bretonnia and Marienburg.

== Dogs of War ==
- Borgio the Besieger^{m} - Mercenary-prince of Miragliano in Tilea. Famed for being notoriously hard to kill, until his assassination with a poisoned toasting fork.
- Detlef Sierck - The greatest living playwright, slayer of Constant Drachenfels, and lover of Genevieve Dieudonne.
- Lietpold the Black - A mercenary captain and self-made ruler in the Boarder Princes lands.
- Lorenzo Lupo^{m} - Mercenary-prince of the city of Lucinni in Tilea. Possibly modeled on the Roman Hercules, for his incredible physique and training programmes.
- Lucrezzia Belladonna^{m} - Lucresszzia is a Tilean noble known for her beauty and ability to keep control over the province of Pavona. The secret to her success is thought to be the careful "accidents" all surrounding poison.
- Marco Colombo^{m} - Great swimmer, not a fish out of water.

== Empire ==
- Aldebrand Ludenhof^{m} - Aldebrand is the Elector Count of Hochland.
- Balthasar Gelt^{m} - Supreme Patriarch of the Colleges of Magic and Patriarch of the Gold Order.
- Boris Todbringer^{m} - Elector Count of Middenland. Political rival to Karl Franz
- Brunner - a ruthless, feared human bounty hunter known for not only his great skill in combat and tracking his quarry, but also for the variety of exotic and deadly weapons he wields (pistols, a magical sword, a stake capable of slaying a Tomb King, and a Skaven repeating crossbow amongst other, more powerful items). He is a character created by C.L. Werner's novels set in Warhammer Fantasy.
- Constant Drachenfels - The "Great Enchanter". One of the most powerful wizards who ever lived.
- Detlef Sierck - The greatest living playwright, slayer of Constant Drachenfels, and lover of Genevieve Dieudonne.
- Felix Jaeger - Friend and remembrer to Slayer Gotrek.
- Karl Franz^{m} - Prince and current Emperor of the Empire of Man
- Kurt Helborg^{m} - Captain of the Reiksguard Knights, Reiksmarshall of the Imperial armed forces.
- Ludwig Schwarzhelm^{m} - The Emperor's Champion and Imperial Standard Bearer.
- Luthor Huss^{m} - Prophet of Sigmar. Took Valten under his wing and convinced the Emperor of Valten's divine blood. Spends his time preaching against the corruption in the upper ranks of the Sigmarites (never attacks the leader of the Sigmarites Volkmar Von Grimm).
- Magnus the Pious - the Emperor that re-unified the Empire and allowed the creation of the Colleges of Magic.
- Mathias Thulmann - a ruthless witch hunter that hunts down and slays all those thought to be in league with chaos or the undead - chronicled in the Witch Hunter books from Black Library
- Markus Wulfhart - the Huntsmarshal of the Empire, is a legendary scout. After slaying the Drakwald Cyclops, he was given a magical bow from the Imperial vaults and was then tasked by Karl Franz with recruiting a band of like-minded elite scouts.
- Marius Leitdorf^{m} - Marius is the Elector Count of Averland, but is best known as the Mad Count of Averland. Known to have waged war against forests, bees, and imagined foes. He is, however, noted for his martial skill and bravery in battle. Karl Franz considers him a fast ally.
- Morgan Bernhardt - a Mercenary commander who once defeated gigantic hordes of Undead.
- Sigmar Heldenhammer - Deified founder of the Empire. Nowadays worshipped as a god. Created setting ‘Age of Sigmar’
- Thyrus Gormann^{m} - Patriarch of the Bright College of Magic. Former Supreme Patriarch.
- Valten^{m} - The avatar of Sigmar. He was critically wounded by Archaon and went missing. The sickbed on which he had been resting was covered in blood, a Skaven symbol had been carved in the wall, and a "dark, glowing, serrated blade" had been stabbed into the bed.
- Valmir von Raukov^{m} - Elector Count of Ostland.
- Volkmar 'the Grim' von Hindenstern^{m} - Grand Theologian of Sigmar. Holds a vote in the Imperial Electors

== Kislev ==
- Tzarina Katarin^{m} - Current Queen of Kislev, titled the Ice Queen.
- Tzar Boris^{m} - Former Tzar of Kislev, father of Katarin.
- Kostaltyn - Supreme Patriarch of the Ursunite Faith. Notably similar to Rasputin

== Undead ==
- Abhorash - The father of the Blood Dragon bloodline of vampires and the only master vampire to unwillingly take the elixir of eternal life. Abhorash scaled on top of a great mountain and a red dragon of immense size emerged from the crater and descended upon the Vampire Lord. The two fought the entire night and in the end the Vampire was victorious. As the dragon lashed in its death throes, Abhorash seized its throat with his fangs and drank deep. Intoxicated by the blood of the dragon Abhorash cast the carcass of the broken creature down from the mountain top. Because of the dragon's blood, he no longer needs the blood of human men.
- Arkhan the Black^{m} - Former lieutenant of Nagash when living, raised as undead and continued to serve.
- Constant Drachenfels the Great Enchanter alongside Nagash and Teclis possibly the most powerful magic-user of the Warhammer World, despite having been slain more than once he keeps resuscitating himself, his keep, the ominous "Schloss Drachenfels" (or Castle Drachenfels in English) also keeps "growing back" after each successive destruction, thanks to the magic Constant himself imbued in the very earth and stones of the place.
- Dieter Hellsnicht^{m}, Doomlord of Middenheim - A necromancer and leader of an undead army around 1270 IC.
- Dread King - A giant necromancer that leads various types of undead and carries a large sword.
- Genevieve Dieudonné - A vampire who appears in a number of novels by Jack Yeovil. Unusual as an undead character as she can most often be found trying to preserve the realms of humans against evil, rather than destroy them.
- Hand of Ualapt - Servant of the Tomb King's vulture-headed god of scavengers and guardian in the Temple of the Vulture Lord located in the Land of the Dead in Warhammer Online.
- Heinrich Kemmler the Lichemaster^{m} - A mighty necromancer. It is currently rumored that he is a puppet of Nagash.
- High Priest Herakh - High Priest of the Temple of the Vulture Lord located in the Land of the Dead in Warhammer Online.
- Khalida Neferher^{m}, - High Queen of Tomb Kings.
- Krell, Lord of Undeath^{m} - was a mighty Chaos Champion in the days before the birth of Sigmar, the ruler of a barbarian tribe that had been corrupted by the Chaos God Khorne. Though eventually slain by the Dwarf hero Grimbul Ironhelm during his assault on Karak Kadrin, Krell was returned to the mortal realm almost 1500 years later at the mercy of the great Necromancer, Nagash. Krell was finally defeated by Sigmar many years later and the resurrected by Heinrich Kemmler, the Lichemaster. Armed with the Black Axe - a terrifying weapon of immense proportions, Krell will cut a bloody swathe through all in his path.
- Lady Melissa d'Arques - A vampire who is over 1100 years old and is one of the oldest vampires in existence, she is also a member of the Vampire Council under Elder Honorio and is the Grandmother in Darkness of Genevieve Dieudonné who is her Grand Get.
- Melkhior^{m} - A powerful Necrarch vampire, student and slayer of W'Soran and former mentor of Zacharias the Everliving. Believed to have been destroyed by Zacharias. Rumoured to be W'soran.
- Luthor Harkon - a vampire of the Blood Dragon bloodline who was shipwrecked on the coast of Lustria and founded an undead realm using lost sailors in the area now known as the Vampire Coast.
- Nagash^{m}, - First and greatest of necromancers, and one of the three greatest magic users in the entire world. Nagash created the entire scourge of undeath and introduced it to the world, and is likely the most powerful "undead" present.
- Neferata^{m} - Mother of the Lahmia bloodline of vampires and previous queen of all the seven original vampire masters. She currently resides in the Silver Pinnacle.
- The Red Duke - The Red Duke is the former Duke of Aquitaine, who was betrayed and left for dead. Abhorash observed the man and offered to save him with his own blood dragon blood. From this blood, a new vampire was born, slaying his betrayers and friends alike. He was eventually defeated, but resurrected again, taking residence in Mousillion.
- Settra the Imperishable^{m} - The First and Eternal king of all Tomb Kings. He founded the liche priest cult and was the first king to be preserved. He hates all vampires.
- Ushoran - Father of the Strigoi bloodline of vampires. He is believed to be killed in the Orc invasion of the capital of his kingdom of Strigos. He in fact survived and lived on in the empire as the secret patron in of the strigony. He was asked by one of the strigony to exact vengeance on the men who slaughtered his caravan. He agreed to do it. After killing the soldiers. He went on to kill the noble who commanded them to kill the strigony. He continued on to kill the count of averland.
- Usirian's Keeper - Bone giant servant of Usirian, the faceless Tomb King god of the underworld, in the Temple of the Vulture Lord located in the Land of the Dead in Warhammer Online.
- the Von Carstein vampires
  - Vlad^{m} - A powerful vampire count, killed at the Siege of Altdorf by the Grand Theogonist and the treachery of Mannfred. The father of the von Carstein bloodline of vampires. Relative of Nagash and originally a noble of Nehekhara. Holds the von Carstein ring allowing him to be continuously resurrected.
  - Isabella^{m} - The wife of Vlad von Carstein, who committed suicide at the Siege of Altdorf once she heard her beloved Vlad was killed. She did this as she did not wish to carry on her unlife without him.
  - Mannfred^{m} - A descendant of Vlad and a powerful magician defeated but not necessarily killed at the "Battle of Hel Fenn".
  - Konrad^{m} - Another descendant of Vlad and utterly, irredeemably insane. Presumed dead.
- Walach - the favourite of Abhorash's minions, he ruled Blood Keep and was Grand Master of the Blood Knights until Blood Keep was razed by the templars and witch hunters of the Empire during a lengthy siege.
- W'soran - The father of the Necrarch bloodline of vampires and the only master vampire to stay loyal to Nagash. Rumoured to be Melkhior.
- Zacharias the Everliving^{m}, - A powerful Necrarch vampire.
- Count Noctilus Leader of the blessed dread and a powerful warlord, lives in the Maelstrom, and is a descendant of Vlad von Carstein
- Cylostra Direfin - She is the maiden of the drowned deep who once was a famous Bretonnian court singer
- Aranessa Saltspite is the pirate queen of Sartosa, an island located in the south of Tilea,

renowned for being one of the largest hideouts of pirates in the Old World.

== Skaven ==
- Deathmaster Snikch^{m}, - Deathmaster Snikch is the chief assassin and prime agent of Lord Sneek, Lord of Decay and Nightlord of clan Eshin. Possible murderer of Valten.
- Grey Seer Thanquol^{m}, - Thanquol is one of the most powerful and active of the Grey Seers. He is always accompanied by Boneripper, his mechanized undead Rat Ogre. Though he is supremely cunning and a masterful schemer, his plans are nearly always thwarted by Gotrek and Felix (the defeats are often compounded by Skaven cowardice and incompetence), and he hates and fears them in equal measure.
- Ikit Claw^{m} - Ikit Claw has dedicated his long life to the study of all forms of magery, including the spells of Men and Elves. His loyalty is to clan Skryre.
- Lurk Snitchtongue - Grey Seer Thanquol's servant who secretly tries to double cross his master numerous times in the Gotrek and Felix series of novels. He later becomes mutated by sneaking aboard Malakai Makaisson's airship The Spirit of Grungi which ventured into the Chaos Wastes. Lurk eventually believes he is the chosen of the Horned Rat and leads a skaven rebellion.
- Plague Lord Nurglitch^{m} - The first plague lord of clan Pestilens and member of the Council of Thirteen. It was his corrupting disease that now marks clan Pestilens members as different from the other clans.
- Lord Skrolk^{m} - Skrolk was a simple Plague Monk at the beginning of his life, but his devotion to the Horned Rat aided him in the long struggle for power, eventually leading him to Skavenblight to offer his services to Nurglitch, the seventh Arch-Plaguelord.
- Skweel Gnawtooth^{m} - Skweel is clan Moulder's greatest packmaster. Born a runt, his continual fight for survival eventually led to great skill in commanding the larger, more unstable rats like Rat Ogres.
- Thrott the Unclean^{m} - Master mutator of Clan Moulder. Possesses a warpstone eye and three arms, which prove an advantage in combat, as he can wield both a mancatcher and sword at once
- Tretch Craventail^{m} - Tretch is the Clanchief of the Skaven clan Rictus and is known for his cunning and ability to survive any situation. He took his title as Clanchief by disguising himself as a stalactite and falling upon the previous Clanchief, splitting him in two.
- VerminLord Skreech Verminking Lord skreech verminking is the avatar of the horned rat. He was part of the original council of thirteen and when they displeased the horned rat and were imprisoned skreech ate them and turned into the most powerful skaven of all time
- Warlord Queek Headtaker^{m} - Warlord Queek the Head-taker is the right claw of Warlord Gnawdwell, the ruler of Clan Mors and the City of Pillars. Gnawdwell is one of the Lords of Decay and without doubt one of the most powerful warlords in the Under-Empire.

== Ogre ==
- Greasus Goldtooth^{m} - Tradelord Greasus Tribestealer Drakecrush Hoardmaster Goldtooth the Shockingly Obese. Overtyrant of the Goldtooth tribe and the area surrounding his kingdom. The most successful tyrant yet in the Mountains of Mourn
- Skrag the Slaughterer^{m} - a downcast Ogre Butcher and Prophet of the Great Maw
- Jhared the Red - the first true Ogre Hunter. Covered in thick red hair all over his body
- Golgfag Maneater^{m} - Mercenary captain and the first Ogre to coin the phrase Maneater
- Bragg the Gutsman^{m} - is the champion executioner of Ogrekind, a slayer of kings and heroes. To see him on the field of battle is to see death itself at work. Armed with the fearsome Great Gutgouger, a massive poleaxe, Bragg has an affinity for striking just the right point on his foe to cause maximum damage.
- Ghark Ironskin - Chieftain of the Ironskin Tribe and the first Ogre to claim a Rhinox as a personal mount. Allied with the Chaos Dwarves, who have built a mechanical mount to replace his slain Rhinox.

== Lizardmen ==
- Lord Mazdamundi - The most senior living Slann in the world. Speculated to have caused great damage to the early Dwarf empire in the distant past with his geomantic magics.
- Venerable Lord Kroak^{m}, - Greatest of the first generation of the Slann, though his powers are a shadow of what they once were due to his death in ancient times where Khorne sent his 12 Greatest Bloodthristers with his most powerful anti-magic runes burned into their flesh smote him. Exists today only as a mummified relic within which his formidable spirit still lingers.
- Kroq-gar^{m}, - One of the greatest Saurus warriors and perhaps the greatest warrior in the world, he was spawned in Xhotl and hunts down chaos warriors as an outrider. He is worshipped in Albion as a wrathful God. Kroq-Gar has slain the chaos riding demon prince Vashnaar the Tormentor as well other great foes.
- Grymloq^{m} - Is Kroq-Gars Carnosaur steed. Found as part of a brood feasting on a slain Thunder Lizard he was the most ferocious. He is his masters thirteenth steed to date and the most powerful, having slain chaos dragons as well as other warped beasts brought by the enemies of the Old Ones.
- Nakai - A Kroxigor from the first spawning, known to have killed legions of Chaos worshipers and Daemons as well as Dwarfs in the battles of Itza and Albion. Held the Bridge of Stars during the Great Fall against a horde of demons by himself. Thought dead he has reappeared many times during the Lizardmen's greatest hour of need, his scales are exceptionally tough even for other ancient Kroxigors.
- Tehenauin^{m} - leads the faithful of Sotek in a ceaseless war against the vile Skaven of Clan Pestilens.
- Adohi-Tehga Lord of Tlaxtlan - A second generation Slann and second only in power to Mazdamundi.
- Chakax^{m} the eternity warden: The prime guardian of Xlanhuapec. As the eternity warden, he guards the Slanns' Chamber of Eternity against outside intrusion. Considered to the greatest bodyguard of all time, no one has ever fallen beneath his protection. Hundreds of skaven and dark elf assassins have been smashed by his great mace.
- Oxyotl^{m} - An ancient Chameleon Skink whose temple city was sucked into the Realms of Chaos. Alone he sneaked and killed across the wastes for centuries before crossing Naggorth and finally coming back home to Lustria where thousands of years had passed in his wake. No Slann dare read his mind in case of being tainted.
- Tetto'Eko^{m} - A venerable old Skink priest who is a loremaster of Celestial spells. He was given a palanquin like a slann's, in order to carry his frail body and other arcane artifacts.
- Tiktaq'To^{m} - A skink chieftain who rides a terradon. Helped to fight off the Chaos Horde and had command of the city of Hexoatl while Lord Mazdamundi was away.
- Ten Zlati - A skink terradon rider who is known as the Oracle of Kroak, due to the fact that Lord Kroak often uses this skink's body to vassal from.
- Gor-Rok - An ancient white Saurus known as the "Great White Lizard". He is the champion of Itza.

== Deities ==
=== Elves ===
- Asuryan
- Vaul
- Kurnous
- Morai-Heg
- Isha
- Kaela Mensha Khaine
- Lileath
- Loec
- Hoeth

=== Greenskins ===
- Gork and Mork
- The Great Spider (Forest Goblins Only)

=== Dwarfs ===
- Grimnir*
- Grungni
- Valaya
- Rukh
- Morngrim
- Mordred
- Hrungnor
- Alfginnar
- Azram the Mighty

=== Ogre ===
- The Great Maw

=== Human ===
- Sigmar
- Ulric
- Morr
- Taal

=== Chaos ===
- Khorne
- Slaanesh
- Tzeentch
- Nurgle
- Malal
- The Horned Rat
- Hashut
- Zuvassin
- Necoho

=== Law ===
- Solkan
- Alluminas
- Arianka

=== Lizardmen/Slann/Amazon ===
- Chotec, the Solar God
- Sotek, the Serpent God
- Quetzl, the Protector God
- Huanchi, the Jaguar God
- Tzunki, the Water God
- Tlazcotl, the Impassive
- Tepok, the Inscrutable

== Creatures ==
=== Humanoids ===
- Dwarf.
- Halfling
- Human.

Humans have many distinct cultures, including the men of The Empire, Bretonnia, Kislev, Norsca, Albion, Middenheim, Tilea, Estalia as well as more far of places such as Ind, Arabay, Nippon and Cathay. Oh and Of course Amazons.

- Elf: High Elves (7th)"/>

As with Humans Elves have several different cultures, the main ones are the High Elf, Dark Elf and Wood Elf, although the High Elves have further subdivisions such as the Shadow Elves of Nagarythe and the Elves of Caledor who are culturally distinct.

- Ogre
- Giant

=== Greenskins ===
- Orc
  - Savage Orc
- Black Orc
- Goblin
  - Common Goblin
  - Night Goblin
  - Forest Goblin
  - Troglagob (Aquatic Goblin)
  - Boggart (Marsh Goblin)
  - Fire Kobold
  - Dust Goblin (Undead Goblin)
  - Greater Goblin (Also known as a Hill Goblin)
  - Lesser Goblin (Also known as a Hill Goblin - these are also known as Gnoblars)
- Snotling
- Gnoblar
  - Boglar (Aquatic Gnoblar)
- Hobgoblin
- Iron orc
- Squig

=== Undead ===
- Skeleton
- Wraith - failed attempt of necromancer to become Lich, grim-reaper-like appearance
- Banshee
- Spectre
- Zombie
- Ghoul - former bestial humans who turned cannibalised
- Wight - "Skeleton" with mind, but not free-will
- Mummy
- Vampire
- Vhargulf - devolved feral Beast-like vampire
- Carrion - giant undead birds
- Tomb Scorpion
- Bone Giant
- Liche - powerful undead being with free-will, see Nagash
- Strigoi
- Zombie Dragon

=== Beasts ===
- Dragon
  - Green Dragon
    - Forest Dragon
  - Blue Dragon
    - Sea Dragon
  - White Dragon
  - Black Dragon
  - Red Dragon
- Wyvern - dragon like creature with wings but only two limbs
- Hydra
- Kharibdyss
- Chimera
- Griffin
- Hippogriff
- Taurus
- Lammasu
- Manticore
- Giant Scorpion
- Great Eagle
- Tuskgor
- Razorgor
- Mastiff
- Mournfang
- Rhinox
- Sabretusk
- Yhetee
- Cockatrice
- Stonehorn
- Thundertusk
- Cerberus
- Mammoth
- Elephant

=== Daemons ===
- Chaos Undivided
  - Chaos Spawn
    - Wyrd Spawn
  - Daemon Prince
  - Chaos Fury
  - Hellcannon - part machine, part-daemon
- of Khorne
  - Bloodletter
  - Bloodthirster
  - Fleshhound
  - Juggernaught
- of Nurgle
  - Great Unclean One
  - Nurgling
  - Plaguebearer
  - Beast of Nurgle
- of Slaanesh
  - Daemonettes
  - Fiends
  - Keeper of Secrets
  - Steeds of Slaanesh
- of Tzeentch
  - Lord of Change
  - Flamer
  - Pink/Blue Horror
  - Screamer
    - Disk of Tzeentch

=== Elementals ===
- Earth Elemental
- Death Elemental/Mardagg
- Life Elemental/Viydagg
- Water Elemental/Sea Elemental
- Fire Elemental
- Air Elemental
- Mud Elemental
- Wisentlich (WHFRP)
- Spirit Elemental

=== Beast-humanoids ===
- Skaven - rat like humanoids
- Beastmen
- Minotaur - bull humanoids
- Dragon-Ogres
- Dragon-Ogre Shaggoths
- Bull-Centaurs - half chaos dwarf/half bull
- Rat-Ogre - giant bipedla rat creatures
- Centigor - centauroids with the upper body of a beastman atop a horse-like body
- Harpy
- Werewolf
- Centaur - half man/ half horse
- Ghorgon - four-armed bull giants
- Cygor - cyclopsian bull humanoids
- Ganeshan - four-armed giant elephant humanoids

=== Lizard ===
- Zoat
- Troglodyte
- Saurus
- Skink
- Slann
- Stegadon
- Arcanadon
- Cold One
- Carnivorous Snapper/Cold One Warhound
- Carnosaur
- Beeka
- Salamander
- Winged Serpent
- Kroxigor
- Crocodile

=== Sea monsters ===
from Man O' War

- Triton - possibly a demi-god
- Sea Elemental
- Gargantuan - giant snake like creature
- Promethean - a giant crab
- Helldrake - created by dark Elves from dragons
- Kraken - a giant squid
- Megalodon - a giant shark
- Black Leviathan - a giant toothed fish
- Sea Dragon
- Behemoth
- Archelon

=== Other ===
- Ushabti - Anubis-lookalike statues used as guards by Tomb Kings
- Troll
  - Stone Troll
  - River Troll
  - Chaos Troll
  - Cave Troll (From Advanced Heroquest)
  - Snow Troll (From the old Citadel Journal Norse Army List, and the LRB Blood Bowl Norse Team)
  - Forest Troll (From the 7th Ed Orc and Goblin Army book Playtests, however the rules never made it canon)
  - Lava Troll (White Dwarf April 2005. Can be used as a Dogs of War unit.)
- Fimir
- Treeman
  - Dryad
  - Treekin
- Gorger

== See also ==
- Games Workshop
