= Inquisitor (tabletop game) =

Tabletop game

- Designers: Gavin Thorpe and others
- Publishers: Games Workshop
- Players: 2+
- Setup time: 5 - 30 minutes
- Playing time: 30 minutes - 3 hours
- Chance: Dice rolling
- Age range: 12+ (though it is aimed at older, more mature players)
- Website: Inquisitor Homepage

Inquisitor is a 2001 tabletop miniatures game based in Games Workshop's Warhammer 40,000 (Warhammer 40K, or simply 40K) universe. Whereas the main line of Warhammer 40K games is based on squad based tactical warfare, Inquisitor focused on a small group of player characters akin to many role-playing games. Inquisitor miniatures are no longer produced by Games Workshop but, whilst they were, the game had its own website and 54 mm scale models were available as "Specialist Games" from the Games Workshop catalogue.

Players choose a warband, typically made up of an Inquisitor and their henchmen, but also potentially led by any of a huge variety of characters from throughout the 40K universe's Imperium, such as Rogue Traders, Space Marines or Tech-priests. It also offers the chance for players to take on the guise of some of the Imperium's greatest enemies, such as Chaos Lords, the Demonic legions of Chaos, Genestealer Cult Leaders, or twisted Mutants.

== The game ==
The game was supported by Games Workshop's Specialist Games division, which periodically released new rules for the game through the Specialist Games website Home | Games Workshop Webstore. The game was intended for older wargamers, aged 16 and up.

The Inquisitor rulebook was available as a hard copy from Games Workshop, or as a PDF from the Specialist Games website. It gives information about the Inquisition and the Warhammer 40K universe in general. The name, when written, is sometimes shortened to =I=, =][=, or -][- by fans, in homage to the symbol of the Inquisition as depicted on the cover of the rulebook.

Inquisitor uses a rules system in which two 10-sided dice (known together as a d100 or d%) are thrown to generate a percentile value, with one die representing the "tens" and the other representing "units". Standard six-sided dice are also used for several of the game's mechanics.

There are, technically, no limitations on the effective power and equipment of a player character - the rules do not prevent a player from creating a character armed with extremely potent combinations of equipment and skills. The game rulebook does offer an optional "points" system that the organisers of a campaign might use to limit or guide their players, and the general expectation is that players exercise common sense when creating their characters. Unlike a tactical wargame or role-playing game, Inquisitor describes itself as a "narrative" skirmish game, with an emphasis on storytelling in the nature of action movies or adventure novels, as opposed to a focus on winning at all costs.

=== Source books ===
There were several additional companion rulebooks for the Inquisitor game available:

- Thorian Faction Sourcebook:

This book details the background and history of the Thorian philosophy and those who follow it. Amongst other topics, the book focuses on the efforts of Promeus, a semi-legendary figure from the earliest days of the Imperium, and his desire to revive the Emperor of Mankind from his half-life existence on the Golden Throne. It traces his and his followers', the Promeans, attempts to achieve their end, and their conflict with their allies and later rivals led by Moriana. Over millennia, the two factions slowly disappear, but their history and achievements paved the way for two factions, the Thorians and the Horusians, to rise and seek out a new way to approach the divine nature of the Emperor.

The book details additional characters and how the followers of the Thorian philosophy interact with other Ordos of the Inquisition. It also provides additional weapons and powers to be used by the Thorians.

=== Campaigns ===
There are three campaigns in the game and each has a Conspiracies book: These books are no longer available from Games Workshop.

- The Cirian Legacy details the planet of Cirian V, controlled by Tech-Priests of the Adeptus Mechanicus. It includes three individual campaigns, lists and details on important characters, groups that deal with Cirian V, and background on the Scarla sector surrounding Cirian V. The campaign begins as a simple mission for the players to discover why the Adepts of the Conclave have ceased paying their Imperial tithes. But as the situation deteriorates - in a mess of rioting miners, psychotic tech-priests and hallucinogenic smoke - the players are confronted with even more sinister events unfolding.
- Death of an Angel contains three different campaigns. Set on Karis Cephalon, the campaign guides the players both as allies and opponents in a storyline that begins with a simple mutant uprising, which swiftly takes a turn for the worse. Who is trying to release the daemon Phraa'gueotla, and why? And can there really be any substance to rumours of a pre-Imperial superweapon - the Angel - hidden somewhere beneath the planet's surface?
- Heavenfall contains two campaigns with details on important characters and background. The machinations of Inquisitors Scarn and Lichtenstein have collided on the once-beautiful Equinox. Faced with a rogue assassin on the loose and the enigmatic Eldar taking an interest in a world that was once theirs, the players are presented with a dire situation with no obvious hope for success.

== Characters ==
Player characters are usually represented in-game by 54 mm miniatures purchased from Games Workshop, roughly twice as large as the standard 28 mm Heroic scale of WH40K miniatures. The models available represent existing characters (such as Witch-hunter Tyrus, or Inquisitor Eisenhorn) presented in the rulebook. Players wishing to depict their own unique characters are generally required to extensively convert their models, or give them unique paint schemes. However, the distances given in the rulebook are written as yards, so that players can use any scale of miniature they wish, including the same models with which they play standard Warhammer 40,000.

There are many different groups that players can play. Presented here are the archetypes represented in the Rulebook:

- The titular Inquisition: An order that operates as a secret police of the Imperium, charged with rooting out threats to mankind from both within and without, and granted absolute authority in its mission to do so.
- The Adeptus Astartes: They are the "Space Marines," a legion of warriors that serves the Emperor of Mankind, being genetically enhanced supersoldiers, fanatically devoted to the cause of the Imperium.
- The Adeptus Mechanicus: The engineers of the Imperium, focused primarily on technology and research.
- Rogue Traders: Bands of merchant-adventurers or similar people, whose allegiance may vary.
- Cultists and Fanatics: Street preachers and zealots who mostly serve the Ecclesiarchy and worship the Emperor of Mankind.
- The Imperial Guard: The primary military force of the Imperium - unlike the Adeptus Astartes, they are most often normal human beings.
- Desperados: Gunslinging rogues akin to Rogue Traders, their allegiance may vary.
- The Enforcers: They serve the Imperium but may also operate as independent/rogue groups under the command of a disloyal commander of an individual ruler of a world.
- Mutants: Mutants are humans either warped by the power of Chaos or mutated due to genetic deviancy. They are hunted down by those Inquisitors who deem any mutation as a threat against humanity and the Imperium.
- The Ecclesiarchy: The religious organisation of the Imperium, officially known as the Adeptus Ministorum, they maintain and spread the worship of the Emperor of Mankind.
- Arco-Flagellants: Heretics deemed by the Ecclesiarchy only able to gain redemption through their use as mindless living weapons against the enemies of the Imperium.
- The Assassins: Formally known as the Officio Assassinorum, they are trained warriors who specialise in assassination, killing in the name of the Imperium and the Emperor.
- Daemonhosts. Daemons of the Warp which are imprisoned within human hosts. Primarily used by the chaos cults, as well as some factions of the Inquisition.

== Critical reception ==
In Issue 19 of The Ancible, Robey Jenkins wrote, "A true wargamer should be sure to try out a game that so purely supports the idea of a narrative game. If a game of Inquisitor has a weak or insubstantial plot, it rapidly becomes boring and repetitive. If it has an exciting, challenging plot, meanwhile, it will only become more so as the game progresses. We all love to talk about those games when [insert mad and awesome thing] happened. In Inquisitor, these happen in every game."

=== Reviews ===
- Backstab #31
- Świat Gier Komputerowych #101

== History ==
After a good period on release where Inquisitor experienced relatively good popularity when compared with other games outside of Games Workshop's main franchises (Warhammer 40,000, Warhammer Fantasy Battles), the game has slowly lost both appeal and support from Games Workshop.

For a time articles featuring Inquisitor were commonly featured in Games Workshop's flagship magazine White Dwarf together with new miniature releases. Partly due to the introduction of Games Workshop's The Lord of the Rings Strategy Battle Game, and the resultant use of the magazine space for articles relating to it, Inquisitor's coverage was later moved to the game's own magazine, Exterminatus. Exterminatus ran for a short period (10 quarterly issues), until Games Workshop grouped all of its Specialist Games range magazines into one larger magazine named Fanatic (for much of its run, Fanatic was solely an online magazine) which was also later discontinued. Together with this miniatures were restricted to online sales only and some have since gone out of production such as the Kal Jerico model. In 2004 the rulebook was made available as a free PDF within the Specialist Games section of the Games Workshop website.

The decline has also been reflected in the game's online support. In 2007 the game's online forum was removed from Games Workshop's servers (although a replacement is now hosted and run privately by fans at the-conclave.co.uk, where it still has a loyal fanbase).

At the same time, a considerable majority of the Fanatic online articles were taken down from the site. No "official" content has been released by Games Workshop since its site redesign, thus any new articles or updates since then have been fan-written.

Production of Inquisitor miniatures by Games Workshop has now ceased and, following a period when the remaining stock was sold off, the miniatures are no longer available from Games Workshop either online or in store.

While the game is currently no longer supported by Games Workshop, and the models are no longer available in the 54mm scale, the game is still played by players that often review some of Games workshops' older properties.

In recent years, a scaled down version has been created by a loyal group of players. Lovingly referred to as "Inquisimunda", this version of Inquisitor scales down the miniatures to a more accessible 28mm/28mm heroic scale sizing, with players using models kitbashed from other models, or directly using models from the Games Workshop “Warhammer 40,000” or "Necromunda" lines (hence the term "Inquisimunda", a portmanteau of both games).

Beyond the scale change, the game rules remain largely intact, but hardcore devotees can still find models and materials on reseller and auction sites.
