= World of Warcraft: Illidan =

2016 novel by William King

- Author: William King
- Cover artist: Clint Langley
- Language: English
- Series: Warcraft
- Genre: Fantasy novel
- Publisher: Del Rey Books
- Publication date: April 12, 2016
- Publication place: United States
- Media type: Print (hardcover)
- Pages: 336 pp
- ISBN: 978-0399177569

World of Warcraft: Illidan is a Warcraft novel written by William King and published by Del Rey Books on April 12, 2016. In it, more details are revealed about Illidan Stormrage's actions and intentions than was revealed in The Burning Crusade.

== Plot ==
The book starts with Illidan being released from his 10,000-year captivity by Tyrande and his first encounter with Malfurion since he was sealed away. He never wants to be imprisoned again. The book travels into the future, specifically the point where Illidan defeats Magtheridon and is ordered to destroy the Frozen Throne, where Ner'zhul, the current Lich King, and Arthas, the next one defeat him. Afterwards, the story skips ahead again to about six months before he is slain by the WoW player characters.

This book introduces the process of which a Night Elf or Blood Elf becomes a Demon Hunter, by introducing Vandel, a Night Elf who joins Illidan in his quest to annihilate the Burning Legion and their master Sargeras. Later, Illidan and his hunters invade Nathreza, homeworld of the nathrezim, or dreadlords, such as Tichondrius and Varimathras, and it is the world where the Legion's knowledge is stored. Illidan obtains the Seal of Argus and destroys the remaining records. After leaving, Illidan destroys the portal to Nathreza in such a manner, that, more or less like Draenor, Nathreza was blown up.

Illidan reveals to his lieutenants that the demons of the Twisting Nether cannot be slain permanently, unless they either die within the Twisting Nether itself, or an area corrupted by its energies, such as Nathreza. Illidan also reveals that he intends to lead his armies, using the Seal of Argus, to Argus, the Eredar homeworld, where they can annihilate nearly the entire command structure of the Burning Legion since the Eredar control the Legion for Sargeras.

Before his death, Illidan uses a large portion of his power to visit Argus. In a vision while on Argus, he meets an elder naaru who informs him that he will be instrumental in fighting both the Legion, Sargeras, and a threat even greater, the Void, the dark corruption that created the Old Gods, and also is, after a fashion, responsible for the creation of the Burning Legion. The naaru also informs Illidan that he will transcend death. It is assumed that this is a reference to the fact that Demon Hunters, much like the Burning Legion's demons, do not die when they are slain but their soul is returned to the Twisting Nether and then the soul can regenerate inside a body. Or, unlike demons, if Demon Hunters find their original body and return to it, it heals their wounds so that they can live again.

In the last days of Illidan, Maiev Shadowsong, Akama and the player characters siege the Black Temple. Before the raid reaches him, Illidan sends all his Demon Hunters through a portal to attack the Legion; this is the beginning of the Demon Hunter specific questline in Legion. Illidan calmly awaits the raid at the top of the temple and fights back but ultimately is slain. Vandel, who was killed by Maiev earlier, reawakens, to find the Black Temple under the control of the Wardens and Illidan dead. Preparing to fight them, Vandel hears Illidan psychically speak to him, telling him that he must be prepared. Vandel leaves, intending to rebuild the Demon Hunter forces.

== See also ==
- List of novels based on video games
