= Black Library =

British publishing company

- Parent company: Games Workshop
- Founded: April 1997
- Country of origin: United Kingdom
- Headquarters location: Nottingham
- Distribution: Simon & Schuster (US, UK)
- Publication types: Books; Audiobooks
- Fiction genres: Science fantasy Science fiction Fantasy
- Official website: www.blacklibrary.com

The Black Library is a division of Games Workshop (formerly a part of BL Publishing) which is devoted to publishing novels and audiobooks (and has previously produced art books, background books, and graphic novels) set in the Warhammer Fantasy Battle, Warhammer Age of Sigmar and Warhammer 40,000 fictional universes. Some of Black Library's best known titles include the Gaunt's Ghosts and Eisenhorn series of novels by Dan Abnett and the Gotrek and Felix series by William King and Nathan Long.

The authors of these novels, graphic novels, and comics created original storylines and characters that are based on playable armies in the main Warhammer 40,000 game and its many spin-offs (such as Inquisitor or Epic). These works are then promoted with contributions of stories, plot synopses, and rules in the White Dwarf magazine and at the official Games Workshop website. The result is a fusion of tabletop gaming with science fiction and fantasy writing.

== History ==
The publishing company takes its name from the fictional Black Library that appears in the setting of Warhammer 40,000. The fictional Black Library is where the Eldar race keeps their collected knowledge of Chaos and the Necrons.

The Black Library was founded in April 1997 by Andy Jones and Marc Gascoigne to publish Inferno! magazine, a bi-monthly digest-sized anthology of short stories, comic strips and features from the Warhammer worlds. Inferno! was a test bed for new artists and authors and allowed Games Workshop to 'test and learn' by trying new formats of fiction and illustration to explore the depths of Warhammer and Warhammer40,000. Black Library began as a small team at Games Workshop who brought together INFERNO! magazine. Inferno!'s success spawned Warhammer Monthly comic books, and then from September 1999 a lengthy series of fantasy and science fiction novels. Their first art book, Inquis Exterminatus was published in May, 1999. Black Library's catalogue now runs to well over two hundred titles, with a Warhammer and a Warhammer 40,000 novel appearing every month.

In October 2003 BL Publishing started a sister imprint, Black Flame, which applied the same pulp styling to novels featuring New Line Cinema characters such as Freddy Krueger and Jason Voorhees, and 2000 AD comics' Judge Dredd and others. In 2006, Black Flame produced the novel for the New Line Cinema's feature film Snakes on a Plane. In the summer of 2005 BL Publishing announced another fiction imprint, Solaris Books, that will publish original science fiction and fantasy. Solaris Books has subsequently been sold to Rebellion who also own Abaddon Books.

== Background ==
Short stories and other pieces of fiction were created for the White Dwarf magazine, for Warhammer 40,000 rulebooks and gaming guides, for other publications, such as the Citadel Journal, and for each of their official websites. Later, these evolved into larger novels and other works.

A series of Warhammer 40,000 comics were first created for the Games Workshop magazine, Warhammer Monthly as short background filler. In 1999, the first miniature and game tie-in was released as a joint project of Warhammer Monthly and its publisher, the Black Library. This model was the bounty hunter Kal Jerico of the "Specialist Game" Necromunda.

Including rules and a certificate of authenticity, the Black Library created many more limited edition miniatures and expanded the small comics into larger collections while adding many new ones. These novels and graphic novels are accompanied by cross-promotional articles that connect the characters from the novels to the Warhammer 40,000 miniatures game.

While Warhammer Monthly was discontinued in 2004 (although still listed at the Black Library website), there was a short lived continuation under the title Warhammer Comics. However, with the discontinuation of these magazine projects, the Black Library still continues to produce graphic novels and collections that expand upon the fiction behind the tabletop game.

=== Gaming with the Black Library ===
The works produced by the Black Library detail the interactions of the Warhammer 40,000 armies: Chaos Space Marines, Daemonhunters, Dark Eldar, Eldar, Imperial Guard, Necrons, Orks, Space Marines, T'au, Tyranids, and the Witch Hunters. They are collaborated efforts between the authors of the Warhammer 40,000 game rules and the writers of the background.

These works expand on the storylines, characters, armies, and organisations discussed in the Codexes. Combined with contributions to White Dwarf magazine of articles, stories, and rules, and miniature lines produced by both Games Workshop and Forge World, they expand upon the fictional world of the original Warhammer 40,000 game and its other companion games. The column "Chapter Approved" of White Dwarf is a forum for collaborations between authors, model makers, and the rulemakers, allowing for the characters to have their own place amongst Warhammer 40,000 battles.

Alongside of the Warhammer 40,000 game was a short-lived game called Warhammer Warriors. The system was created by Rick Priestley and based on the playing style of LostWorlds. Many of the characters released for the miniature game were given rules and a "gaming book" to be used in playing against others. This series ended before many of the novels were published and production of cross-promotional books was discontinued.

=== Fiction of the Black Library ===
Most of the stories take place thousands of years after the fall of the Emperor of Mankind at the hands of his favoured son Horus, once loyal but corrupted by Chaos. Many millennia have passed since then but the Imperium is still at war with the Chaos Space Marines, along with many new enemies.

The majority of these stories are written in the perspective of humans, primarily those of the Imperial Guard, the mechanic/scientist-mystics of the Adeptus Mechanicus, the female warriors of the Sisters of Battle, the holy Inquisition, and the superhuman Space Marines, although some have been written from the perspective of corrupt Chaos-worshipping humans, as well as the alien Eldar and T'au races. They span the complete Warhammer 40,000 universe.

== Novels and short fiction line ==
=== The Inquisition Trilogies ===
Dan Abnett began a series of trilogies involving the Inquisition, beginning in 2001 with the Eisenhorn trilogy: Xenos, Malleus, and Hereticus. In the omnibus edition, released in 2004, there are two short stories placed between these novels to connect them together.

A second trilogy began in 2004, around the time the Eisenhorn omnibus came out, known as the Ravenor trilogy: Ravenor, Ravenor Returned and Ravenor Rogue. The Ravenor omnibus was released in 2009, also with two connecting short stories.

Abnett revealed in the foreword to the Ravenor omnibus that he was planning a "trilogy of trilogies", and the third set, its title confirmed in an interview with Abnett as the Bequin trilogy - started in October 2012 with Pariah: Ravenor Versus Eisenhorn.

==== Plot ====
The Inquisition (The Holy Orders of the Emperor's Inquisition) is an organisation in the fictional Warhammer 40,000 universe. They act as the secret police of the Imperium, hunting down any and all threats to the stability of the God-Emperor's realm. In the first trilogy, the titular character is Inquisitor Gregor Eisenhorn, a member of the Ordo Xenos (a division of the Inquisition devoted to hunting aliens, though they also uphold the Inquisition's creed of prosecuting "enemies of the state"), as he begins his descent into radicalism and association with daemonhosts and dark sorcery. The second trilogy is focused around Eisenhorn's former student, Inquisitor Gideon Ravenor, also of the Ordo Xenos, as he battles a powerful nemesis and seeks to defeat a conspiracy involving high Imperial officials. The third trilogy (comprising Pariah and Penitent, with the third unreleased book titled Pandemonium) centres on Alizebeth Bequin, an "untouchable" (anti-psychic, or psychic blank) who had been a long-time, trusted member of Eisenhorn's inner circle.

==== Warhammer 40,000 gaming ====
Eisenhorn was made as an official model for the Inquisitor spin-off game. Unlike Inquisitors for the main Warhammer 40,000 game, the Inquisitor version of Eisenhorn is equipped with many beyond the normal standard items: he is equipped with a Power Sword, a special "rune" staff, a "duelling" pistol, grenades and flak armour. He also has the ability to use telepathy.

While the main Warhammer 40,000 games does include two inquisitorial armies (Daemon Hunters and Witch Hunters) official rules for the Alien Hunters of the Ordo Xenos to which Eisenhorn belongs have not been published. Rules for him and Daemonhosts are included in the official Inquisitor rulebook, and generic rules for him and Daemonhosts are included in the Daemonhunters army codex.

=== Gaunt's Ghosts ===
Gaunt's Ghosts are currently collected into three "sequences": The Founding, The Saint, and The Lost. The Founding includes the novels First and Only, Ghostmaker, and Necropolis. The Saint includes the novels Honour Guard, The Guns of Tanith, Straight Silver, and Sabbat Martyr. The Lost includes the novels Traitor General, His Last Command, The Armour of Contempt, and Only in Death,. The planned fourth sequence "The Victory" includes "Blood Pact" and "Salvation's Reach".

==== Plot ====
The Gaunt's Ghosts series follows Colonel-Commissar Ibram Gaunt and the army of Tanith from the creation of the Tanith Regiment of the Imperial Guard and its abandonment of their planet before the destruction of it at the hands of invading Chaos legions. The stories follow the many adventures of the Tanith "First and Only" regiment as they seek to prove themselves. Things are complicated by dissension against their commander, Gaunt, for not letting them die alongside their brethren at the destruction of their planet.

==== Warhammer 40,000 gaming ====
After the success of Gaunt's Ghosts, lines of Gaunt's Ghosts based miniatures were produced by Games Workshop. Unlike the previous models, these were not limited edition sets. The production covered both the main characters of Abnett's works (like the title character Colonel-Commissar Ibram Gaunt and also created a generic Imperial Guard variant called the Tanith First and Only. Rules were originally published for these miniatures in "Chapter Approved" column of White Dwarf UK 269/US 268 and later collected in the Chapter Approved edition for 2003.

With the creation of the 4th edition Imperial Guard codex, the previous rules for the Tanith First and Only were removed and they were instead a "variant" army created using "doctrine" (variations to traditional army rules). While Colonel-Commissar was given specific rules in the Imperial Guard codex, the other special characters, according to the official Games Workshop website, still use the rules presented in Chapter Approved and provide additional modelling types and rules to create more characters based on the Gaunt's Ghost series.

=== Space Wolves ===
Space Wolf, by William King, with additions from Sons of Fenris, describes the Space Wolves and Ragnar Blackmane in the Warhammer 40,000 universe. The Space Wolf Omnibus is a collection composed of Space Wolf, Ragnar's Claw, and Grey Hunter. Space Wolf: The Second Omnibus by William King and Lee Lightner contains the novels, Wolfblade, and Sons of Fenris (by Lightner rather than King) and Wolf's Honour.

==== Plot ====
The Space Wolves series follows the history of Ragnar Blackmane, a young warrior who has to prove himself in combat who later becomes a fierce leader of the Space Wolves. Not only does he battle against the enemies of the Imperium, he also battles against their fellow Space Marines, the Dark Angels, which stems from a long time feud about which is the superior chapter.

==== Warhammer 40,000 gaming ====
Ragnar Blackmane is a special character for the Space Wolves Space Marines chapter. He is unique in the fact that he has a limited edition promotional model produced by the Black Library and a standard piece produced by Games Workshop. The model produced for the Black Library pits Ragnar Blackmane against the Thousand Sons Chaos Space Marine Madox.

Ragnar Blackmane, in the Space Wolves companion codex to the Space Marines army book, is a "Wolf Lord" ranked Space Marine. He was equipped with a "master-crafted" bolt pistol, a "master-crafted" frost blade (a special weapon used by the Space Wolves), grenades, and special clothing/equipment unique to the culture of the Space Wolves (a wolf tooth necklace, a wolf tail, and a wolf pelt). He can be joined with two wolves that accompany him into battle.

Alongside of Ragnar Blackmane and the Space Wolves are members of the Imperial Guard army, the legions of the Adeptus Mechanicus, Inquisition, and the Space Marines.

== Comics and graphic novels line ==
=== Bloodquest ===
Bloodquest: Eye of Terror Trilogy, by Gordon Rennie and Colin MacNeil, is a collection of three works titled Bloodquest, Bloodquest: Into the Eye of Terror, and Bloodquest: The Daemon's Mark. The trilogy involves the founding Space Marines chapter, the Blood Angels, as they struggle first against the Orks and then against the armies of Chaos.

==== Plot ====
Captain of the Blood Angels, Leonatos was given a weapon called "Encarmine," the "Sword of Belarius," as a prize for his prowess as a warrior and for the accomplishments of his men on the battlefield. However, Garshul the Destroyer, an Ork, manages to capture the weapon, causing Leonatos to be dishonoured and then exiled. He wanders with his fellow soldiers as they try to regain their honour by hunting down the sword.

This takes them to the world of Eidolon, but they crash land on the wrong side. They are forced to battle the forces of Chaos that control the planet. They must battle against the armies of each Chaos god that control a separate continent in their path so they can finally regain their treasured weapon and their honour so they could be welcomed back once again amongst their brethren.

==== Warhammer 40,000 gaming ====
The GamesDay Golden Demon Award model of 2001 was a converted "Captain Leonatos" of Bloodquest, painted by Bobby Wong. Previously, Captain Leonatos was produced as a miniature in 1999 as "Blood Angel Captain Leonatos, Commander of the Exile". This was in a limited quantity of only 1,000 models sculpted by Mike McVey. Cloten and Lysander, Captain Leonatos's troops, were also produced the same year and titled "The Exiles." They came together and were produced in a limited quantity of 500 miniatures sculpted by Mark Bedford.

In the Warhammer 40,000 game, Captain Leonatos is a Captain of the Space Marine's chapter, the Blood Angels. While he, and his men, no longer have "canon" rules, they can be used as their generic equivalents. Their original rules accompanied the production models. He did not deviate in equipment from that available for a standard Captain, as with his men. Captain Leonatos and his men also paralleled the "Eye of Terror" Campaign, exploring the "Eye" before the gaming tournament began.

In the Warhammer 40,000 "visual combat game", Warhammer Warriors, the gaming book Warhammer Warriors #2 was created for Captain Leonatos. He equipped with many Blood Angels based weapons, such as a chainsword, bolt pistol and a flamer, but also has new weapons designed for Warhammer Warriors, like Photon Flares and a Bolt Pistol Hotshot. He deals extra damage and has a strong defence based on his Space Marine power armour.

=== Daemonifuge ===
Daemonifuge: Heretic Saint

Daemonifuge, originally published in Warhammer Monthly, is a series of Trade Paperbacks about the life of Ephrael Stern, a member of the Adepta Sororitas, and is collected as Daemonifuge: Heretic Saint. The two books of the series are Daemonifuge, by Kev Walker and Jim Campbell, and Daemonifuge: The Lord of Damnation, by Kev Walker, Gordon Rennie, and Karl Richardson.

In addition to the original series, a smaller series was released called Daemonifuge: The Screaming Cage. This series was produced in three parts, and reproduces the original series with additional pages added/edited into the original plot.

==== Plot ====
Ephrael Stern was a Seraphim ranked Sister for the Order of Our Martyred Lady. Mysteriously, she was the sole survivor out of 12,000 that was sent to the planet Parnis in order to battle a daemonic infestation. Inquisitor Silas Hand originally was sent to identify if she was tainted by Chaos and if that was the reason for her survival. While being locked up and awaiting the Inquisitor's arrival, Stern was attacked by possessed individuals. She removed the daemons from the individuals, and these actions combined with Silas Hand's investigation's inability to psychically look through her mind and detect traces of daemonic taint upon her lead to no conclusion. Hand was forced to return with her to the planet Parnis in order to figure out her role in the destruction of her Sisters.

During the return, their vessel's navigator was possessed by Chaos destroyed their ship the "Hammer of Thor." Escaping, both Hand and Stern were able to land upon the surface, but they were the sole survivors. Shortly after landing upon the planet, they were soon confronted the Daemon Q'tlahsi'issho'akshami. Only Stern managed to live through the battle, and she is now hunted by the Ordo Malleus to be brought in for questioning. Only Stern knows what happened to Silas Hand, what happened to the Daemon, and what the forces of Chaos were doing on the planet.

==== Warhammer 40,000 gaming ====
A limited edition of only 1,000 miniatures was released for Daemonifuge. These miniatures were sculpted by Juan Diaz, Mark Harrison & Alex Hedstrom in 2004 and are no longer in production. Portraying Ephrael Stern and Silas Hand on a diorama base and entering into combat against the Daemons of Chaos.

In the Warhammer 40,000 game, Ephrael Stern is a Seraphim of the Witch Hunters and Silas Hand is an Inquisitor for the Daemonhunters army. While they no longer have "canon" rules, they can be used as their generic equivalents. Their original rules accompanied the production models. Ephrael Stern was armed with a standard bolter, a blessed sword (wounded daemons easily, negated invulnerable saves, and destroyed enemy leadership), a jump pack, general bonuses against daemons and is not allowed to receive "faith" based bonuses standard for the Sisters of Battle. She could not join a unit with her fellow Sisters or an army containing any Inquisitor besides Silas Hand (with Silas, she counted as a "henchman". Silas Hand was armed with a bolter (using "Psycannon bolts", psychically charged weapons used against daemons) and a force field for defence. He could only include Ephrael Stern in his retinue.

In the Warhammer 40,000 "visual combat game", Warhammer Warriors, the gaming book Warhammer Warriors #3 was created for Ephrael Stern. She equipped with many Sisters of Battle-based weapons, such as a powersword, bolter and a flamer, but also has new weapons designed for Warhammer Warriors, like Photon Flares and a Bolt Pistol Hotshot.

Ephrael Stern and Silas Hand are also used as part of an introductory article explaining the background of the Witch Hunters army list, called "Villainy & Infamy." The article is "report" produced by an "unknown" source which describes the history of Silas Hand's investigation from an in-universe perspective.

=== Lone Wolves ===
Lone Wolves is a graphic novel by Dan Abnett and Karl Richardson which describes the interactions of Imperial Guard variant and the Space Marines' chapter, the Space Wolves, when fighting the Tyranids. The story is broken into seven parts, "The Miracle," "Eaters of the Slain" Part 1 and 2, "Payback" Part 1 and 2, and "Bloodgeld" Part 1 and 2. Prefaced to the story are short essays produced by editor, Christian Dunn, about the nature of heroes and following the story is the ending original created by Dan Abnett.

In 2004, a Flash movie and Official Website was created by the Black Library as a limited edition miniature was produced for sale.

==== Plot ====
The Imperial Guard's division titled the "10th Slavok Regiment" are abandoned on the ice-planet Shadrac, which is currently controlled by a Tyranid invasion. Sergeant Poul Marlin narrates the travels of the remaining squads of soldiers as they struggle against hunger, the elements, and the aliens who want to devour them. Joined by the Space Wolves led by Skold Greypelt, the Slavok 10th are able to stand against constant attacks and perform deeds of heroism.

==== Warhammer 40,000 gaming ====
Sergeant Poul Marlin, Skold Greypelt, an unidentified Space Wolf and a wounded Slavok soldier were produced as a miniature "diorama" for Warhammer 40,000 in 2003 as "Lone Wolves." This was in a limited quantity of only 500 models sculpted by Martin Footitt and Adam Clarke.

In the Warhammer 40,000 game, Poul Marlin a sergeant of the Slovok regiment, an Ice World variant of the Imperial Guard army (similar in design and appearance to the established Valhallan Ice Warriors), and Skold Greypelt is a Captain of the Space Marine's army, the Space Wolves. While they, and their men, lack specific additional rules, they follow standard rules for equipment and statistics with the addition of the "Xeno hunter: Tyranids"/"Preferred Enemy: Tyranids" trait (Skold and his "Lone Wolves" are a Space Wolves version of the Ultramarines's special "Tyranid War Veterans" unit).

== Periodicals ==
From 1997 to 2005, Black Library published Inferno!, a magazine of short stories, artwork, and other features set in the various fictional universes of Games Workshop's fantasy and science fiction games. These initially included Warhammer Fantasy Battle, Warhammer 40,000, and Necromunda, and later added the Mordheim and Gorkamorka settings.

From 1998 to 2004, Black Library published the Warhammer Monthly comic book based on the Warhammer Fantasy Battle and Warhammer 40,000 fictional universes. The comics were republished as a series of trade paperback comics.

Black Library discontinued the two periodicals because their sales were meagre compared to the novels.

In August 2010 Black Library announced that it was releasing a new monthly ezine called Hammer and Bolter. Like Inferno! it contains short stories set in the fictional worlds of Warhammer Fantasy Battle and Warhammer 40,000. The magazine also features interviews with Black Library authors, previews of forthcoming novels, and serialised novels. In the first year of Hammer and Bolter the serialised novel was Phalanx by Ben Counter. In the second year (2011–12) the serialised novel was Gilead's Curse by Nik Vincent and Dan Abnett.
