= William King (author) =

Scottish writer

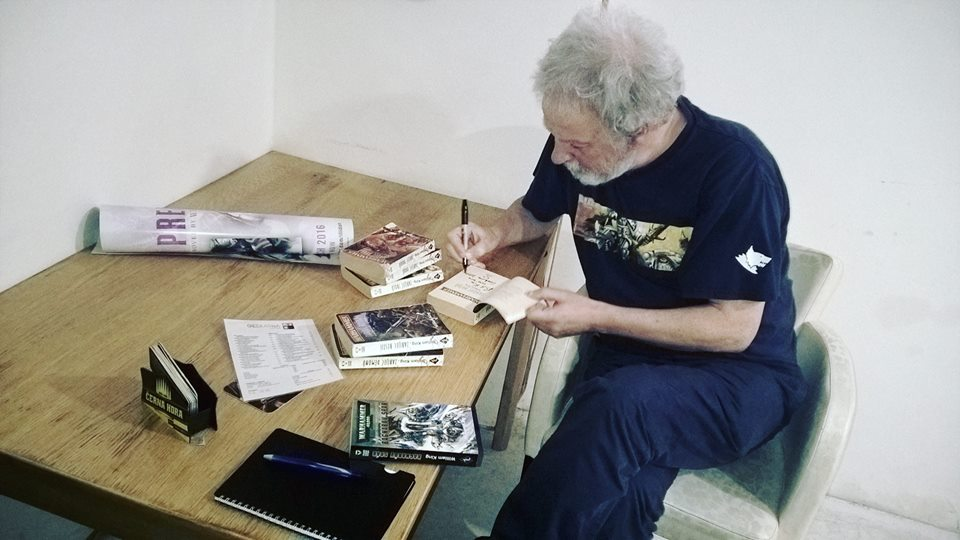
- The author, William King
- Born: Bill King; 7 December 1959 (age 66); Stranraer, Scotland
- Occupation: Writer
- Writing career
- Genres: Science fiction Fantasy

William King (born 7 December 1959), also known as Bill King, is a Scottish writer of a number of science fiction and fantasy books, most notably in Games Workshop's Warhammer and Warhammer 40,000 series, published by Games Workshop's fiction arm Black Library.

== Career ==
King wrote Trollslayer (1999), the first novel published under the Games Workshop's Black Library label.

His most memorable characters, Gotrek and Felix, have appeared in a series of novels, beginning with Trollslayer, a collection of previously published and new short stories. His next-most-famous character is Ragnar Blackmane, a Space Marine from the Warhammer 40,000 game setting universe (although the character was already in existence in the game and background material, King took him and expanded his history in the novel series).

In 2010, he signed a three-book deal with Black Library that will focus on elven brothers Tyrion and Teclis.

Prior to moving to the Czech Republic, King spent a number of years as a designer for GW, contributing to their game universes (where much of his fiction is also set). He has also written a tetralogy of books featuring the Death's Angels which are available in the Czech Republic, Spain and Germany.

He married his long-time girlfriend, Radka, on 24 September 2005, and lives in Prague with his family.

King's latest work has been Illidan: World of Warcraft for Blizzard Entertainment, released in March 2016.

== Bibliography ==
=== Novel series ===
Gotrek and Felix series

- Trollslayer (1999)
- Skavenslayer (1999)
- Daemonslayer (1999)
- Dragonslayer (2000)
- Beastslayer (2001)
- Vampireslayer (2001)
- Giantslayer (2003)

Tyrion and Teclis trilogy

- Blood of Aenarion (2011)
- Sword of Caledor (2012)
- Bane of Malekith (2013)

Macharian Crusade trilogy

- Angel of Fire (2012)
- Fist of Demetrius (2013)
- Fall of Macharius (2014)

Ragnar Blackmane series

- Space Wolf
- Ragnar's Claw
- Grey Hunter
- Wolfblade

Terrarch tetralogy

- Death's Angels
- Tower of Serpents
- The Queen's Assassin
- Armies of the Dead (retitled Shadowblood)

=== Short stories ===
- "Green Troops"
- "Red Garden"
- "Visiting the Dead"
- "Skyrider"
- "The Price of Their Toys"
- "The Laughter of Dark Gods"
- "Geheimnisnacht"
- "Wolf Riders"
- "Dark Beneath the World"
- "Uptown Girl"
- "Deathwing" (with B. Ansell)
- "Devil’s Marauders"
- "Skaven's Claw"
- "Easy Steps to Posthumanity"
- "The Mutant Master"
- "In the Belly of the Beast"
- "Ulric’s Children"
- "Blood and Darkness"
- "The Mark of Slaanesh"
- "The Ultimate Ritual" (with N Jones)
- "The Wrath of Khârn"
- "Redhand's Daughter"
- "The Guardian of the Dawn"
- "The Servants of the Dark Master"

=== Other works ===
- Farseer
- Laughter of Dark Gods (short stories anthology)
- The Inquiry Agent (a Victorian mystery)
- Illidan: World of Warcraft
- Warzone: Mutant Chronicles
