= Trollslayer =

Book by William King

- First edition book cover
- Author: William King
- Language: English
- Series: Gotrek and Felix
- Genre: Fantasy novels
- Publisher: Black Library
- Publication date: 1999
- Publication place: United Kingdom
- Media type: Print (Paperback)
- Pages: 284 pp (first edition, paperback)
- ISBN: 978-1-84154-100-6 (first edition, paperback)
- OCLC: 41832854
- Followed by: Skavenslayer

Trollslayer, a novel written by William King, is the first in a series of twelve books following the adventures of Gotrek and Felix, in the Warhammer Fantasy universe. The book is written in an episodic format, with each chapter featuring a different adventure with different supporting characters and different villains. It shows the background for many important things in Felix's reminiscing in other stories, such as his first encounter with Chaos, his first great love, and where he got his magical sword.

The material in Trollslayer was first released under that title in 1999 and a second edition was released in 2003. It was also included in a volume with the second and third in the series, titled Gotrek & Felix: The First Omnibus, released in 2006. A free ebook edition was made available on the Black Library website in October 2010. Trollslayer was also republished in 2013 as part of the Black Library Classics series.

== Plot summary ==
=== Geheimnisnacht (Night of Secrets) ===
The first chapter finds the adventurers shortly after meeting for the first time and leaving Altdorf together. They are kicked off the coach they were riding on because of Gotrek's comments toward the coach driver and especially his wife. As they continue to travel on foot, they are nearly run down by a black coach, and Gotrek vows to find it and hurt the driver. They reach the Standing Stones Inn, and are able to make their way through the barred door to learn of how on Geheimnisnacht a coven who are based in the Darkstone Ring steal children and other people for sacrifices. They learn that the son of the innkeeper, Gunter, and his wife have both disappeared, and so they vow to find the Darkstone Ring and destroy the coven and save Gunter and his wife. After finding the path to the Ring, they come across a rotting cultist who chants gibberish before being felled. They finally come across the Ring and coven and discover that the leader of the coven is the driver of the Black Coach. They listen in for a while and learn that it is dedicated to Slaanesh, Lord of Pleasure. They finally attack and destroy the coven as they intended to sacrifice a stolen baby, and in the aftermath they discover that Gunter and his wife were both cultists, and so are both dead. They rescue the baby, and move on... This story is frequently alluded to by Felix later in the series, as it was his first true glimpse at Chaos.

=== Wolf Riders ===
The story begins with Felix in a tavern protecting a girl from the attentions of three huge trappers: Hef, Kell, and Lars. He holds his own until Gotrek comes in and drives them out. The girl introduces herself as Kirsten, and explains how her family is part of the von Diehl migration, a cursed noble family and their servants and their families moving to the Border Lands. Gotrek and Felix were on their way to the Dwarf stronghold of Karak Eight-Peaks because of stories of treasure they had heard. They decide to join the von Diehls, as they are heading in the same general direction, and they could use the cover afforded by carts. After traveling through the Grey Mountains, and reaching the Border Lands, Felix falls deeply in love with Kirsten, and she likewise. While camped in the Cursed Hills, the camp is attacked by Undead warriors, and during the fight, Felix kills the trapper Lars, after he goes crazy and attacks him. The men drive off the Undead, and they set off to find a ruined fort, which Gotrek helps repair, hinting at his pre-slayer background as an engineer. Finally, the fort is attacked by Wolf Riders, led by a Goblin Shaman, and during the first siege, Gottfried, the leader of the von Diehls, is struck by an arrow and is carried off by his son, Deiter; his nephew, Manfred; Frau Winter, a sorceress; and Kirsten, Frau Winter's assistant, to be healed. After a day of no word from them, and with the second siege starting, Felix goes off to investigate, leaving Gotrek and the remaining men to fight off the horde ready to break through the gates. Felix comes across Frau Winter and Kirsten, the former who is dead and the latter who is dying. Felix watches her die, and swears to avenge her. He then comes across Dieter, whose head was bashed in, and enters Gottfired's room to see him stabbed to death in his bed with Manfred sitting there wiping off his blade. He then explains that the "curse" of the von Diehls was mutation brought on by a heretic cursing Manfred's grandfather. Manfred, going mad, explains that he broke the curse by killing all of the von Diehls. He and Felix duel, and Felix kills him, uttering "The curse is broken". He goes outside to see Gotrek standing on a pile of goblin, wolf and human bodies, including Hef and Kell. He single-handedly held the gate, killing the Shaman and losing his eye in the process. The surviving humans are taken in by one of the many Border Princes, whilst Gotrek and Felix leave, and the story ends...

=== The Dark Beneath the World ===
The story continues immediately after 'Wolf Riders', with Felix and Gotrek travelling towards Karak Eight Peaks in search of treasure. On the way, they meet a party of men under attack from Orcs. The pair intervene and save the three survivors: Aldred Keppler, a zealous fanatic from the Templars of the Fiery Heart, Johann Zauberlich, a sorcerer, and Jules Gascoigne, a Bretonnian scout, are also journeying to Karak Eight Peaks on a quest. The group decide to travel together. They arrive at a settlement built by the Dwarves close to the ruined city, and ask permission to enter the city, where they learn what the three men are searching for: a magical sword called Karaghul, an heirloom of the Order of the Fiery Heart, left in the city during a previous effort to reclaim part of the city by the Dwarves from the Goblins that infest it. The group are given leave to enter the city, but before they go, a Dwarven Priestess of Valaya warns them that great evil is stirring in the ruins of the city...

The group journey into the depths of the ruined city, battling with Goblins, Orcs, Skaven and Ogres that now infest the ruined halls. As they go deeper, they are followed by ghostly lights. Eventually, the lights reveal themselves as dwarven ghosts, who beg Gotrek to help them. When he asks what has happened, they say that an ancient and powerful evil has desecrated their tombs and dragged them back from their eternal rest in the Hall of Ancestors, and that unless it is slain and the tombs resanctified, they will never find their way back to eternal rest. Gotrek vows to aid them.

The group finally come to a great treasure room-the very one that Felix and Gotrek have been seeking. In pride of place is a great sword, which Aldred recognizes as Karaghul. However, before he can claim it, a huge creature bursts out and kills him, tearing his head from his shoulders. The creature is a great troll, tainted and corrupted by warpstone, twisted and mutated by the power of Chaos that it has become something far more terrible. Gotrek realizes they are in a Dwarven tomb, and that the troll's presence is the reason why the ghosts are stalking the ruins of Karak Eight Peaks. The group attack, but the troll has the ability to heal its wounds almost instantaneously, and they can only slow it. The troll kills Jules and Zauberlich, but not before the sorcerer learns that fire destroys the troll's ability to regenerate. As Gotrek keeps the beast distracted, Felix throws a lamp on it, which ignites, setting the beast on fire and letting Gotrek finally kill it.

A huge army of Goblins arrives, attracted by the commotion. As Gotrek and Felix consign themselves to dying in battle, the ghosts of the tomb form up in a spectral army and attack the goblins, killing them with ease and causing the survivors to flee. Gotrek angrily says that the ghosts have denied him a heroic death, but they reply he is destined for a doom far greater...that is soon approaching. The ghosts bless him for his deed and disappear, finally at peace. Gotrek ignores the treasure, realizing that to take it would desecrate the tomb and raise the ghosts again, though Felix takes Karaghul in honour of their dead comrades. Leaving the bodies of their companions at rest in the tomb, the pair seal it and leave Karak Eight Peaks behind...

=== The Mark of Slaanesh ===
The story picks up after they have left Karak Eight Peaks and come to a small village at the edge of the Drakwald Forest. The village is controlled by a gang of vicious thugs who are also cultists of Slaanesh, who viciously beat up Felix in the village tavern shortly after his arrival. To make matters worse, in a battle with mutants on the road, Gotrek was struck on the head with a slingstone and is suffering amnesia, no longer remembering who he is, nor who Felix is, or his quest to find a heroic death.

Felix takes Gotrek to a local healer called Kryptmann, who promises to create a brew to restore Gotrek's mind, providing Felix brings back certain ingredients from the nearby mountains. Narrowly avoiding the Slaaneshi thugs and a roving band of mutants, Felix gathers the ingredients and brings them to Kryptmann. However, the brew has no effect, and Felix attacks Kryptmann, accusing the healer of lying to him. In the confusion, Gotrek receives another blow to the head, which restores his memory to him. With the Slayer restored to his wits, the pair go to the tavern and revenge themselves on the cultists...

=== Blood and Darkness ===
The story begins with Gotrek and Felix passing through the Drakwald Forest. They find a young girl called Kat, the sole survivor of a beastman attack on her village. The beastmen were led by a female Chaos Champion of the Chaos God, Khorne, who mysteriously spared Kat's life. The story then switches to the perspective of the female Chaos Champion, a woman called Justine, who turned to Chaos after being raped as a young woman by a nobleman. After many years in the Chaos Wastes, she returns to take her revenge, destroying the nobleman's castle with her army of beastmen and murdering the nobleman. Her army has then taken to raiding nearby villages: however, she has to find and kill Kat in order to become a Daemon Prince and achieve immortality, though she has misgivings about killing the girl (it is constantly hinted, and then finally confirmed later in the story, that she is in fact Kat's mother, a pregnancy caused by her rape).

The story then returns to Gotrek and Felix. After slaying a marauding band of beastmen, the three reach another village and warn them of the coming danger. Unfortunately, the Chaos army learns of their location and Justine leads her army in an attack on the village to find Kat. The beastmen break into the village and a vicious battle breaks out between the beasts and the villagers. Justine battles Gotrek, who injures her but cannot kill her (she was gifted with a prophecy that states no warrior can kill her in battle). Upon seeing Kat, Justine abandons her attack and pursues the girl. Realising what the Chaos Champion is after, Felix attacks her in an effort to distract her from Kat, but is swiftly overpowered. As Justine tries to break his neck, Kat intervenes and kills Justine with her own sword, thus fulfilling the prophecy and saving Felix. With their leader dead, the beastmen flee, pursued by the villagers, who slaughter them all.

Gotrek and Felix leave the village the day after the victory. Though Kat asks to go with them, Felix replies they cannot take her with them, as they are bound for more dangerous places where she won't be safe. Kat accepts this, and they leave, the three promising never to forget each other...

=== The Mutant Master ===
The story begins with the pair arriving at the village of Blutdorf, on their way to Nuln. They learn the villagers are being held to ransom by a sorcerer in a nearby castle who has abducted their children: however, out of fear, the villagers drug the pair and hand them over to the sorcerer.

At the castle, the pair wake up in chains. The sorcerer reveals himself to them, and Felix recognizes him as Albericht Kruger, a fellow student from his days at the University of Altdorf, Kruger having disappeared after stealing forbidden texts on Chaos and its mutations. Kruger, now a megalomaniac egotist, arrogantly explains that he plans to use the knowledge in the texts to create an army of mutants with which to conquer the Empire.

However, the pair break free of their captivity and fight back: when Kruger sends Oleg, the most powerful of his mutated soldiers, to kill them, Gotrek strangles the mutant with the chains he was bound with. Kruger tries to make his escape, but Gotrek and Felix pursue, cutting their way through a horde of mutants Kruger sends at them. They corner him in his study, where he explains that the mutants they had just killed were in fact the children of the villagers, Kruger having discovered children were easier to mutate than adults. In a burst of uncharacteristic fury, Felix seizes Kruger by the throat and throws him to his death from the castle battlements, an act that meets with Gotrek's approval. They set light to the castle and leave for the village, to settle a score...

=== Ulric's Children ===
The story begins with Felix and Gotrek heading through the Drakwald Forest in heavy snow, following the tracks of a monster Gotrek believes to be a troll. The forest is unnaturally quiet, but the wolves that dwell in the forest seem unnaturally active...

The pair get separated, and Felix is captured by a group of Imperial soldiers who are actually cultists of the Chaos God Tzeentch. Felix is bound in chains next to another captive, Magdalena, a beautiful young woman the cult have captured for their dark purposes...

The pair are placed in the dungeons of the cult's leader, Count Hrothgar, and are interrogated by his lieutenant, the sorcerer Voorman. Magdalena explains to Felix the cult have abducted her to use as bait to trap her father, who is one of the "Children of Ulric" -- a werewolf.

Felix manages to escape his captivity and works his way through the manor, killing several of the cultists, including Count Hrothgar. He discovers that Voorman plans to perform a spell on the werewolf that will transfer his soul into its body. As he learns this, the werewolf, leading a massive pack of wolves, attacks the manor, easily defeating the cultists. In the main hall, the monster kills Voorman, but not before he completes his spell. As Voorman takes possession of the monster's body, Felix attacks him with a dagger: a dagger with a blade made of pure warpstone, the only thing that will harm the beast. He manages to defeat the beast; as it dies, the wolves attacking the manor flee, as a new arrival joins the fight: Gotrek, who kept on following the tracks until he reached the manor. They capture Magdalena, and although Felix considers her an innocent in the affair, Gotrek believes that as a shapeshifter she is tainted by Chaos and kills her. Felix later states that this act still haunts him. The pair then carry on for Nuln.

== Publication history ==
In his introduction to the 2013 edition of Trollslayer, William King revealed that he wrote Geheimnisnacht as a one-off story, in 1988, in which Gotrek was meant to die at the end, but later revised it based on his liking for the characters. The story led to the commissioning of another by Games Workshop, and then another, which led to Wolf Riders and The Dark Beneath the World.

The success of these three stories led to King being commissioned to write a full-length novel, which he approached by writing three novella-length stories in episodic format, which became The Mark of Slaanesh, Blood and Darkness, and Skaven's Claw, the last of which later formed the first chapter of the subsequent novel Skavenslayer.

However, Games Workshop Books closed unexpectedly, and the publication of the novel was delayed until 1999, when it also included The Mutant Master and Ulric's Children, which had previously been published in Inferno! magazine. The novel also added the prefacing excerpts from Felix's journal.
