= Ben Counter =

English fantasy writer

- Born: 1979 (age 46–47); Cambridge, Cambridgeshire, England
- Occupation: Writer
- Writing career
- Period: 1999–present
- Genres: science fantasy, fantasy

Ben Counter (1979) is an English fantasy writer, predominantly known for his numerous fiction contributions to various Warhammer 40,000 series. He is also the writer for the Out of Place podcast, a work of serialized fiction with over two dozen episodes.

== Select works ==
=== Grey Knights series ===
- Grey Knights (2004)
- Dark Adeptus (2006)
- Hammer of Daemons (2008)

=== Soul Drinkers series ===
- Soul Drinker (2002)
- The Bleeding Chalice (2003)
- Crimson Tears (2005)
- Chapter War (2007)
- Hellforged (2009)
- Phalanx (2012)

=== Space Marine Battles series ===
- Malodrax (2013)
- The World Engine (2015)

=== Space Marine Legends series ===
- Cassius (2014)

=== The Horus Heresy series ===
- Galaxy in Flames (2006)
- Battle for the Abyss (2008)

=== Standalone novels ===
- The Hunt for Logan Grimnar, with Steve Lyons and Rob Sanders (2020)
