= Eisenhorn =

Series of Warhammer 40,000 novels by Dan Abnett

Cover of the Eisenhorn trilogy

Eisenhorn is a trilogy of science fantasy-crime novels by the British writer Dan Abnett, set in the fictional universe of the Warhammer 40,000 tabletop game. It is the first in a series of trilogies and separate novels by Abnett, which are some of the most popular works of Warhammer 40,000 tie-in fiction.

The series follows the inquisitors Gregor Eisenhorn and Gideon Ravenor and their retinue as they hunt heretics and demons, while attempting not to succumb to Chaos – the archenemy of humankind in the setting – in the process.

Eisenhorn has been adapted as a video game, and was in 2019 considered for adaptation as a television series.

== Books ==
The Eisenhorn series includes:

- Eisenhorn (omnibus, 768 pages, 2004, ISBN 1-84416-156-0):
  - Xenos (2001, ISBN 1-84154-146-X)
  - Malleus (2001, ISBN 0-7434-1176-5)
  - Hereticus (2002, ISBN 1-84154-236-9)
- Ravenor: The Omnibus (omnibus, 768 pages, 2009, ISBN 1-84416-736-4)
  - Ravenor (hardcover, 2004, ISBN 1-84416-072-6, paperback, 2005, ISBN 1-84416-073-4)
  - Thorn Wishes Talon (ebook, 2004, ISBN 978-0-85787-256-2)
  - Ravenor Returned (hardcover, 2005, ISBN 1-84416-184-6, paperback, 2006, ISBN 1-84416-185-4)
  - Ravenor Rogue (2007, hardcover, ISBN 1-84416-460-8)
- Bequin
  - Pariah: Ravenor Versus Eisenhorn (2012, ISBN 1-84970-202-0)
  - Penitent (2021, ISBN 1-78999-851-4)
  - Pandaemonium (forthcoming)
- The Magos (720 pages, 8 March 2018, ISBN 978-1784967024)
  - Includes The Definitive Casebook of Gregor Eisenhorn, a prequel short story compilation

== Adaptations ==
=== Video game ===
Eisenhorn: Xenos is a third-person action-adventure game by Pixel Hero Games. It adapts Xenos, the first book of the Eisenhorn trilogy. It was released on Steam for PC on 10 August 2016, and received mixed reviews.

=== TV series ===
In July 2019, the producer Frank Spotnitz announced that he was developing a TV adaptation of the Eisenhorn series as the showrunner, together with Emily Feller as an executive producer. Nothing came of it, and any option had presumably expired by 2022 when Amazon entered into negotiations about Warhammer 40,000 TV rights.
