= Lord commander =

Lord commander may refer to:

- Lord Commander Eidolon, a character from Warhammer 40,000
- Jeor Mormont, a Lord Commander of the Night's Watch in A Song of Ice and Fire
- Jon Snow, a Lord Commander of the Night's Watch in A Song of Ice and Fire
