= James Swallow =

British writer

- Born: London, England
- Website: https://jswallow.com/

James Swallow is a British author. A BAFTA nominee and a New York Times, Sunday Times and Amazon #1 best-seller, he is the author of several original books and tie-in novels, as well as short fiction, numerous audio dramas and video games.

His writing includes the Marc Dane series of action thrillers, the Sundowners series of Western fiction steampunk novels, and fiction from the worlds of Star Trek, Warhammer 40,000, Doctor Who, 24, Stargate, 2000 AD and many more. He has won Scribe Awards for novels and audio dramas based on Star Trek, Watch Dogs: Legion, Tom Clancy's Splinter Cell and Star Cops. He lives and works in London.

In 2022, Capstone Pictures acquired film rights for the Marc Dane series.

== Novels and novellas ==
=== The Marc Dane series ===
- Nomad (2016), audiobook (2016)
- Exile (2017), audiobook (2017)
- Ghost (2018), audiobook (2018)
- Rough Air (novelette) (2019)
- Shadow (2019), audiobook (2019)
- Rogue (2020), audiobook (2020)
- Outlaw (2021), audiobook (2022)
- Moscow Rules (novella) (2024)

=== Stand-Alone novels ===
- Airside (2022), audiobook (2023)
- Dark Horizon (2023), audiobook (2023)

=== The Sundowners series ===
- Ghost Town (2001)
- Underworld (2001)
- Iron Dragon (2001)
- Showdown (2001)

=== Warhammer 40,000 ===
- Deus Encarmine (2004)
- Deus Sanguinius (2005)
- Faith & Fire (2006), partwork edition (2017), audiobook (2018)
- Red Fury (2008)
- The Blood Angels Omnibus (Collected edition of Deus Encarmine, Deus Sanguinius and the short story Blood Debt) (2008)
- Black Tide (2009)
- The Book of Blood (Collected edition including Heart of Rage and the short stories Crimson Night and Blood Debt) (2010)
- Bloodline (Chapbook) (2010), reprinted in Blood Angels: The Second Omnibus, 25 For 25, Hammer & Bolter #23 (2012), The Best of Hammer And Bolter Volume Two (2013) and Blood Angels: The Complete Rafen Omnibus (2018)
- Hammer & Anvil (2011), partwork edition (2018), audiobook (2019)
- Blood Angels: The Second Omnibus (Collected edition of Red Fury, Black Tide, Heart of Rage, Bloodline and the short story Redeemed) (2012)
- Sisters of Battle: The Omnibus (Collected edition of Faith & Fire, Hammer & Anvil, the short story Heart & Soul and an adaptation of Red & Black) (2017)
- Blood Angels: The Complete Rafen Omnibus (Collected edition of Deus Encarmine, Deus Sanguinius, Red Fury, Black Tide and additional short stories) (2019)
- Sisters of Battle Collection (Limited collected edition of Faith & Fire, Hammer & Anvil, an adaptation of Red & Black and the short stories Heart & Soul and Iron & Bone) (2021)

=== The Horus Heresy ===
- The Flight of the Eisenstein (2007), reprinted as Collector's Edition (2012), audiobook (2013), partwork edition (2018)
- Nemesis (2010), audiobook (2015), Collector's Edition (2016)
- Fear To Tread (2012), audiobook (2012), Collector's Edition (2015), partwork edition (2018)
- Vow of Faith (2016), reprinted in Garro: Weapon of Fate (2017)
- Garro: Weapon of Fate (Collected edition, including Vow of Faith and adaptations of Oath of Moment, Sword of Truth, Burden of Duty, Ashes of Fealty, Legion of One and Shield of Lies) (2017), audiobook (2017)
- The Buried Dagger (2019), audiobook (2019)
- Garro: Knight of Grey (2023), audiobook (2023)

=== Star Trek ===
- Star Trek: Terok Nor - Day of the Vipers (2008)
- Star Trek Myriad Universes - Infinity's Prism (features novella Seeds of Dissent) (2008)
- Star Trek: Titan - Synthesis (2009)
- Star Trek - Cast No Shadow (2011)
- Star Trek: The Next Generation - The Stuff of Dreams (2013)
- Star Trek: The Fall - The Poisoned Chalice (2013)
- Star Trek: Titan - Sight Unseen (2015)
- Star Trek - The Latter Fire (2016)
- Star Trek: Discovery - Fear Itself (2018), audiobook (2018)
- Star Trek: Picard - The Dark Veil (2021), audiobook (2021)
- Star Trek: Coda - The Ashes of Tomorrow (2021), audiobook (2021)
- Star Trek: Strange New Worlds - Toward the Night (2025), audiobook (2025)

=== Doctor Who ===
- Peacemaker (2007), audiobook (2008)

=== Space: 1999 ===
- The Armageddon Engine (novella) (2024), audiobook (2024)

=== UFO ===
- Shadow Play (novella) (2024), audiobook (2024)

=== Stargate ===
- Stargate Atlantis: Halcyon (2006)
- Stargate SG-1: Relativity (2007)
- Stargate Atlantis: Nightfall (2009)
- Stargate Universe: Air (2009)

=== 24 ===
- Deadline (2014), audiobook (2014)

=== 2000AD ===
- Judge Dredd: Eclipse (2004)
- Rogue Trooper: Blood Relative (2005)
- Judge Dredd: Whiteout (2005)
- I Am The Law: The Judge Dredd Omnibus (Collected edition including Eclipse) (2006)

=== Deus Ex ===
- Icarus Effect (2011)
- Fallen Angel (novelette) (2013)
- Black Light (2016)
- Hard Line (novelette) (2016)

=== Splinter Cell ===
- Firewall (2022), audiobook (2022), radio adaptation (2022)
- Dragonfire (2023), audiobook (2023)

=== Watch Dogs: Legion ===
- Day Zero (with Josh Reynolds) (2020), audiobook (2021)

=== Tannhäuser ===
- Enigma (2013)

=== Dark Future ===
- Jade Dragon (2006)

=== Other tie-in fiction ===
- The Butterfly Effect (2004)
- Ghost in the Shell (with Abbie Bernstein) (2017)

== Short fiction ==
=== Original fiction ===
- Snowblind - Silent Night (2002)
- Target Market - Full-Throttle Space Tales Volume 3: Space Grunts (2009)
- Screen Burn - Game Over (2015)
- Toy Soldier - Mech: Age of Steel (2017)

=== Warhammer 40,000 ===
- Crimson Night - Inferno! #38 (2003), reprinted in What Price Victory (2004), The Book of Blood (2010) and Sons of Sanguinius (2021)
- Wings of Bone - Inferno! #40 (2004), reprinted in On Wings of Blood (2019)
- Relics - Inferno! #43 (2004)
- Blood Debt – The Blood Angels Omnibus (2008), reprinted in The Book of Blood (2010) and Blood Angels: The Complete Rafen Omnibus (2018)
- Heart of Rage - The Book of Blood (adaptation of audio drama) (2010), reprinted in Victories of the Space Marines (2011), Blood Angels: The Second Omnibus (2012), Space Marines: The Omnibus (2013) and Sons of Sanguinius (2021)
- The Returned - Legends of the Space Marines (2010), reprinted in Space Marines: The Omnibus (2013) and There Is Only War (2013)
- Redeemed - Blood Angels: The Second Omnibus, reprinted in Hammer & Bolter #16 (2012), The Best of Hammer And Bolter Volume Two (2013) and Blood Angels: The Complete Rafen Omnibus (2018)
- Honours - Games Day UK 2012 Official Programme, reprinted in Black Library Advent Calendar 2012 (2012) and Sons of Sanguinius (2021)
- The Fury - Space Marines: Angels of Death (2013), reprinted in Blood Angels: The Complete Rafen Omnibus (2018) and Sons of Sanguinius (2021)
- Vigil - Space Marines: Angels of Death (2013)
- Dante: Lord of the Host - Lords of the Space Marines (2013), reprinted in Sons of Sanguinius (2021)
- The Sanguinor: Exemplar of the Host - Lords of the Space Marines (2013), reprinted in Sons of Sanguinius (2021)
- Reflection in Blood - Black Library Advent Calendar 2014 (2014), reprinted in Blood Angels: The Complete Rafen Omnibus (2018)
- Red & Black - Sisters of Battle: The Omnibus (adaptation of audio drama) (2017), reprinted in Crusade + Other Stories (2017)
- Heart & Soul - Sisters of Battle: The Omnibus (2017)
- Iron & Bone - Sisters of Battle Collection (2021)

=== The Horus Heresy ===
- The Voice - Tales of Heresy (2009), audiobook (2015)
- Liar's Due - Age of Darkness (2011), reprinted in Lupercal's War (2022), audiobook (2011)
- Lost Sons - Black Library Weekender 2012 Anthology Volume One (2012), reprinted in The Silent War (2016), Lupercal's War (2022), audiobook (2017)
- All That Remains - The Imperial Truth (2013), reprinted in War Without End (2016), audiobook (2017)
- Gunsight - Death And Defiance (2014), reprinted in War Without End (2016), audiobook (2017)
- Exocytosis - Black Library Advent Calendar 2016 (2016), reprinted in Heralds of the Siege (2018), audiobook (2018)
- Ghosts Speak Not - Tales of the Knights Errant, reprinted in The Silent War (2016), audiobook (2017)
- Patience - Tales of the Knights Errant, reprinted in The Silent War (2016), audiobook (2017)
- The Chamber at the End of Memory - Scions of the Emperor (2019), reprinted in Heirs of the Emperor (2022)
- Lantern's Light - Black Library Celebration 2019 (2019), reprinted in Heirs of the Emperor (2022)

=== 2000AD ===
- Passive/Aggressive - Judge Dredd Megazine #225 (2004)

=== Star Trek ===
- Closure - Star Trek: Voyager: Distant Shores (2005)
- Ordinary Days - Star Trek The Next Generation: The Sky's The Limit (2007)
- The Black Flag - Star Trek Mirror Universe: Shards and Shadows (2009)
- The Slow Knife - Star Trek: Seven Deadly Sins (2010)
- The Offer - Star Trek: Explorer #1 (2022), reprinted in Star Trek: Explorer Presents: Star Trek "Q And False" and Other Stories (2022)
- The Mission - Star Trek: Explorer #6 (2023), reprinted in Star Trek: Explorer Presents: Star Trek "The Mission" and Other Stories (2023)

=== Doctor Who ===
- Siege Mentality - Bernice Summerfield Something Changed (2006)
- Museum Peace - Doctor Who Short Trips: Dalek Empire (2006), reprinted in Doctor Who Short Trips: Re:Collections (2009), audiobook (2010)
- The Inconstant Gallery - Bernice Summerfield Collected Works (2006)
- Lady of the Snows - Doctor Who Short Trips: Destination Prague (2007)
- Piecemeal - Doctor Who Short Trips: Snapshots (2007)
- Clean-up on Aisle Two - Doctor Who Short Trips: The Quality of Leadership (2008)
- Rewriting History - The Scientific Secrets of Doctor Who (2015)

=== Stargate ===
- Choices - Stargate: The Official Magazine #10 (2006)
- Outsiders - Stargate: The Official Magazine #20 (2007)

=== BattleTech ===
- Straw Man – Battlecorps.com (2008)

=== Halo ===
- Breaking Strain - Halo: Fractures (2016)

=== Other tie-in fiction ===
- The Turn of The Card - Kaiju Rising: Age of Monsters (2014), audiobook (2014)
- Ashes & Iron - Adventures In No Man's Sky (2016)

== Non-fiction ==
- The Manga Collector's Edition, Volume 1 (co-writer with Peter J. Evans) (1995)
- Starlog: Star Trek's Greatest Guest Stars (contributing writer) (1997)
- Dark Eye: The Films of David Fincher (2003)
- Games Writing: Narrative Skills for Videogames (contributing writer) (2006), revised 2nd edition (2021)
- Above the Law: The Unofficial Guide to Star Cops (contributing writer) (2020)

== Scriptwriting ==
=== Star Trek: Voyager ===
- One, episode #193, 4th season (original story concept) (1996)
- Memorial, episode #236, 6th season (original story concept) (1998)

=== Doctor Who audio drama ===
- Doctor Who: Singularity (2005)
- Doctor Who: Kingdom of Silver / Keepsake (2008)
- Doctor Who - The Companion Chronicles: Old Soldiers (2007)
- Doctor Who: Peacemaker (audiobook) (2008)
- Cyberman 2: Outsiders (2009)
- Cyberman 2: Terror (2009)
- Cyberman 2: Machines (2009)
- Cyberman 2: Extinction (2009)
- Doctor Who - Short Trips in Time & Space: Museum Peace (audiobook) (2010)
- Doctor Who - Destiny of the Doctor: Shockwave (2013)
- Cyberman: The Complete Series 1 & 2 (Collected edition including Cyberman 2) (2016)

=== Blake's 7 audio drama ===
- Blake's 7 The Audio Adventures - Liberator (2007)
- Blake's 7 The Early Years - Point of No Return (2008)
- Blake's 7 The Early Years - Escape Velocity (2010)
- Blake's 7 The Liberator Chronicles: Volume 7 - The Hard Road (2014)

=== Stargate audio drama ===
- Stargate SG-1 - Shell Game (2008)
- Stargate Atlantis - Zero Point (2008)
- Stargate SG-1 - First Prime (2009)
- Stargate SG-1 - Half Life (2012)
- Stargate SG-1 Series 1-2 Collected (Collected edition including Shell Game & First Prime) (2022)
- Stargate SG-1 Series 3 Collected (Collected edition including Half Life) (2022)
- Stargate Atlantis Series 1-2 Collected (Collected edition including Zero Point) (2022)

=== Star Cops audio drama ===
- Star Cops: Blood Moon 2 - A Cage of Sky (2024)

=== V audio drama ===
- V UK: Occupation - Episode 4 (2025)

=== 2000AD audio drama ===
- Judge Dredd: Dreddline (2003)
- Judge Dredd: Jihad (2004)
- Judge Dredd: Grud is Dead (2004)
- Judge Dredd: Crime Chronicles - Blood Will Tell (2009)
- Judge Dredd: Crime Chronicles - Double Zero (2010)

=== Warhammer 40,000 audio drama ===
- Heart of Rage (2009), appears in prose form in The Book of Blood (2010), Victories of the Space Marines (2011), Blood Angels: The Second Omnibus (2012) and Space Marines: The Omnibus (2013), in script form in The Space Marine Script Book (2012)
- Red & Black (2011), appears in prose form in Sisters of Battle: The Omnibus (2017)
- Corsair: The Face of the Void (2018)
- Faith & Fire audiobook (2018)
- Hammer & Anvil audiobook (2019)

=== The Horus Heresy audio drama ===
- Oath of Moment (2010), in script form in The Horus Heresy: The Scripts Volume 1 (2012), appears in prose form in Garro: Weapon of Fate (2017)
- Legion of One (2011), in script form in The Horus Heresy: The Scripts Volume 1 (2012), appears in prose form in Garro: Weapon of Fate (2017)
- Liar's Due (audiobook) (2011), appears in prose form in Age of Darkness (2011) and Lupercal's War (2022)
- Sword of Truth (2012), in script form in The Horus Heresy: The Scripts Volume 2 (2014), appears in prose form in Garro: Weapon of Fate (2017)
- Fear to Tread (audiobook) (2012)
- The Flight of the Eisenstein (audiobook) (2013)
- Burden of Duty (2013), in script form in The Horus Heresy: The Scripts Volume 2 (2014), appears in prose form in Garro: Weapon of Fate (2017)
- Shield of Lies (2014), appears in prose form in Garro: Weapon of Fate (2017)
- Nemesis (audiobook) (2015)
- The Voice (audiobook) (2015), appears in prose form in Tales of Heresy (2009)
- Knight Errant (Collected edition of Oath of Moment, Sword of Truth, Burden of Duty, Ashes of Fealty, Legion of One and Shield of Lies) (2015)
- Ashes of Fealty (2015), appears in prose form in Garro: Weapon of Fate (2017)
- Garro: Weapon of Fate (audiobook) (2017)
- Lost Sons - audiobook (2017), appears in prose form in Black Library Weekender 2012 Anthology Volume One (2012), The Silent War (2016) and Lupercal's War (2022)
- All That Remains - audiobook (2017), appears in prose form in The Imperial Truth (2013) and War Without End (2016)
- Gunsight - audiobook (2017), appears in prose form in Death And Defiance (2014) and War Without End (2016)
- Ghosts Speak Not - audiobook (2017), appears in prose form in Tales of the Knights Errant and The Silent War (2016)
- Patience - audiobook (2017), appears in prose form in Tales of the Knights Errant and The Silent War (2016)
- Exocytosis audiobook (2018), appears in prose form in Black Library Advent Calendar 2016 (2016) and Heralds of the Siege (2018)
- The Buried Dagger (audiobook) (2019)
- Garro: Knight of Grey (audiobook) (2023)

=== Dan Dare audio drama ===
- Dan Dare: The Audio Adventures Volume 01 - Episode 2 The Red Moon Mystery (2016)

=== Space 1889 audio drama ===
- The Steppes of Thoth (2005)

== Videogames ==
- Star Trek Invasion (2001)
- Battlestar Galactica (2003)
- Maelstrom (2007)
- Killzone 2 (2009)
- Necrovision (2009)
- Enslaved: Odyssey to the West - Pigsy's Perfect 10 downloadable content (2010)
- Deus Ex: Human Revolution (2011)
- Deus Ex: Human Revolution - The Missing Link downloadable content (2011)
- Fable: The Journey (2012)
- Deus Ex: Human Revolution Director's Cut (2013)
- Deus Ex: The Fall (2013)
- Disney Infinity 3.0 Star Wars: Twilight of the Republic (2015)
- Fractured Space (2016)
- No Man's Sky (2016)
- Deus Ex: Mankind Divided (2016)
- Ghost Recon Wildlands - Fallen Ghosts downloadable content (2017)
- Space Hulk: Tactics (2018)
- The Division 2 (2019)
- Dark Future: Blood Red States (2019)
- Bleeding Edge (2020)
- Phantom: Covert Ops (2020)
- Fracked (2021)
- Marvel's Guardians of the Galaxy (2021)

== Comics ==
=== Commando ===
- Edge of the Sky (July 2019)
- J-For-Judas (October 2019)
- Fog of War (January 2020)
- Target Tomcat (August 2021)
- Old Dogs (April 2022)
- Duel in the Dark (December 2023)
- Fallen Sabre (June 2024)
- Pressure Point (August 2024)

=== Rivers of London ===
- Here Be Dragons #1 (July 2023)
- Here Be Dragons #2 (August 2023)
- Here Be Dragons #3 (September 2023)
- Here Be Dragons #4 (October 2023)

=== Stingray ===
- "The Undefeated" - Tales from the Depths (August 2024), reprinted in Deadly Uprising (April 2025)
- "Triple Cross" - Battle Lines (January 2025), reprinted in Deadly Uprising (April 2025)

== Other credits ==
- Audio Direction on Maelstrom (2007)
- Script Editor on Highlander: The Four Horsemen audio drama series, episodes 1-4 (2011)
- Script Editor on Stargate audio drama series 3, episodes 2-6 (2012)

== Notes ==
Although uncredited, Swallow is the only British writer to have worked on a Star Trek television series, having created the original stories for "One" and "Memorial", two episodes of the series Star Trek: Voyager.

His novel Day of the Vipers won the International Association of Media Tie-in Writers Scribe Award for Best Original Novel (Speculative) in 2009; Day Zero won the Best General & Adapted Novel category in 2022; Firewall won the Best Original Novel (General) category in 2023; and A Cage of Sky won Best Audio Drama in 2025. He was also nominated for Faith & Fire in 2007, Deadline in 2015 and Fear Itself in 2019.

Nominated in 2017 for the Wilbur Smith Adventure Writing Prize for his novel Nomad, and in 2021 for his novel Rogue.

Nominated for the 2018 Dragon Award for Best Media Tie-In Novel for Fear Itself.

Nominated with Mary DeMarle and Jean-François Dugas in 2012 for the BAFTA Video Games Awards Story category, for their work on Deus Ex: Human Revolution.

Co-winner of the 2012 Canadian Videogames Award for Best Writing for Deus Ex: Human Revolution.

Co-winner of the 2016 Canadian Videogames Award for Best Narrative for Deus Ex: Mankind Divided.

His novels The Poisoned Chalice, Fear To Tread and Nemesis were New York Times Bestsellers in 2013, 2012 and 2010. His novel Nomad was a Sunday Times and Irish Times bestseller in 2016; the follow-up novel Exile was a Sunday Times bestseller in 2017.

At the Pegasus 2 convention held in the UK in 2007, James Swallow auctioned off the chance to have a "walk on role" in the Stargate SG-1 novel Relativity. The money was given to charity. He has previously done this with the books Underworld and Whiteout, and the Doctor Who audio drama Destiny of the Doctor: Shockwave.
