= Swallow's nest =

Swallow's nest may refer to:

- The Chinese delicacy (edible bird's nest) literally translated as "swallow's nest"
- The nest of the swiftlet
- Swallow's nest organ, a wall-mounted pipe organ
- Swallow's Nest, an architectural monument in Crimea
- Swallow's Nest (Blanding, Utah), a sandstone building in Blanding, Utah, USA
- Swallow's Nest, Tirilye, Turkey
- Rondine al nido ("Swallow's Nest"), a romance by Italian composer Vincenzo de Crescenzo
- Schwalbennest ("Swallow's nest"), an epaulette of German military bands' uniforms.
