= Memorial (Star Trek: Voyager) =

- Star Trek: Voyager episode
- Episode no.: Season 6 Episode 14
- Directed by: Allan Kroeker
- Story by: Brannon Braga
- Teleplay by: Robin Burger
- Production code: 236
- Original air date: February 2, 2000

Guest appearances
- Scarlett Pomers - Naomi Wildman; Lindsay Ginter - Saavedra; David Keith Anderson - Ens. Ashmore; Fleming Brooks - Soldier One; Robert Allen Colaizzi Jr. - Dying Colonist; Leslie Hoffman - Nakan Villager; Joe Mellis - Young Soldier; Susan Savage - Alien Woman; Maria Spassoff - Female Colonist

Episode chronology
← Previous "Virtuoso"	Next → "Tsunkatse"
- Star Trek: Voyager season 6

"Memorial" is the 134th episode of Star Trek: Voyager, the 14th episode of the sixth season. After returning from an away mission many crew begin having disturbing dreams.

== Plot ==
Having returned from a two-week away mission of scanning planets and gathering dilithium ore, Chakotay, Tom Paris, Harry Kim and Neelix begin experiencing strange visions: Tom dreams he is engaged in an alien battle whilst Harry has an anxiety attack during routine maintenance. Meanwhile, Chakotay suffers from violent dreams about being in battle and Neelix has a battle hallucination and takes Naomi hostage in the mess hall.

The Doctor's tests show they are reacting to what seem to be real memories, not delusions. As Captain Janeway asks them to retrace their mission, they begin having flashbacks of their roles in a military force whose orders are to temporarily evacuate a group of colonists called the Nakan. (No reason is given for the evacuation.) Commander Saavedra wants no bloodshed but fears that a few of the colonists will resist leaving their homes. In fact, a small group of the colonists do begin firing weapons. Chakotay and the others panic in the ensuing chaos and shoot back; Harry kills two people he finds hiding in a cave. In the end 82 Nakan civilians are dead.

Trying to piece together the puzzle, Janeway orders Voyager into the system the away team was scanning and joins Seven of Nine in reviewing the Delta Flyer's sensor logs. As soon as the Captain sees Tarakis, the second planet encountered by the away team, she also begins having flashbacks of the massacre. She remembers pleading with Saavedra to admit their mistake, but he continues to vaporize the evidence of the colonists' bodies. When she wakes up later in sickbay, Janeway learns that other crew members have also begun experiencing the battle memories.

The Captain sets a course for Tarakis and Janeway, Chakotay, Tom, Tuvok and Harry beam to the surface, but there seems to be no trace of a massacre. Harry locates the cave he remembers, still containing the two Nakans' remains—but they have been dead for 300 years.

Meanwhile, Janeway and Chakotay find a large structure erected in the middle of a grassy field. Seven identifies the structure as a synaptic transmitter sending neurogenic pulses throughout the system. Anyone who enters will experience the memories of the battle—a memorial to the victims and a vivid reminder to never let such a tragic mistake happen again. Because the power cells are deteriorating, the memories are fragmented.

As the hallucinatory nature of the experience has put people in danger, Tuvok has no hesitation about planning to shut down the transmitter; Chakotay, still shaken by the disturbing realism of the visions he was forced to endure, is equally certain. But Neelix, although equally disturbed by the experience, argues that if they do, the Nakan will be completely forgotten. Captain Janeway agrees: she orders them to recharge the power cells, and to place a warning buoy into orbit, so any other unsuspecting visitors to the system will know what to expect. They leave the memorial, so that it may continue to spread its hauntingly effective message.

== Production ==
Although not in main writing credits, the premise for this story was written by James Swallow, who contributed to the story for "One" (S4E25) and also worked on the script for the Star Trek: Invasion computer game. Swallow is a BAFTA nominee and New York Times best-seller awardee. The main story was written by Brannon Braga, with the teleplay by Robin Burger.

One of the props in the episode is supposed to be a 1950s-era television. The story also mentions the geometrical shape of a tetragon, which is a polygon with four sides or angles.

== Reception ==
Io9 ranked "Memorial" 83rd out of 100 out of all Star Trek television episodes.

TVGuide.com noted this episode for depicting post traumatic stress disorder of a science fiction nature. The Digital Fix said this episode had a "powerful message about the persecution" but questioned the ending.

== Releases ==
This episode was released as part of a season 6 DVD boxset on December 7, 2004.
