= That Old Black Magic =

- 78 single

Single by Glenn Miller and His Orchestra with Skip Nelson and The Modernaires
- B-side: "A Pink Cocktail For a Blue Lady"
- Released: January 1943
- Recorded: July 15, 1942
- Genre: Swing, jazz, popular
- Length: 3:03
- Label: RCA Victor
- Songwriters: Harold Arlen (music), Johnny Mercer (lyrics)

"That Old Black Magic" is a 1942 popular song written by Harold Arlen (music), with the lyrics by Johnny Mercer. They wrote it for the 1942 film Star Spangled Rhythm, when it was first sung by Johnny Johnston and danced by Vera Zorina. The song was nominated for the Academy Award for Best Original Song in 1943 but lost out to "You'll Never Know".

Glenn Miller reached number one on Billboard with his recording on Victor Records in 1943 featuring Skip Nelson on vocals.

It was first recorded by Gordon Jenkins and his Orchestra on July 9, 1942. Shortly thereafter, on July 26, 1942, Judy Garland recorded her own version, which was released as a single in January 1943 – just after the movie's release on December 30, 1942. Five other recordings (also made in 1942) were released as singles within the next two weeks.

== Composition ==
The song was published in 1942 and has become an often-recorded standard, with versions that include the original single release by Glenn Miller, by the singers Margaret Whiting, Frank Sinatra, Sammy Davis Jr., Mercer himself, and others. Mercer wrote the lyrics with Judy Garland in mind. Garland recorded the song for Decca Records in 1942. Mercer recalled wanting to write a song about magic, and while composing, asking Arlen to write more music so the song could go on longer, but that they still wrote the whole song in about three hours. Billy Daniels recorded the song in 1949 and it became his trademark recording.

== Recordings ==
- The Glenn Miller recording was released by RCA Victor Records as catalog number 20-1523-A, with "A Pink Cocktail For a Blue Lady" as the B side. The vocals were by Skip Nelson and the Modernaires. Glenn Miller recorded the song on July 15, 1942. The release was Glenn Miller's last number-1 hit. It charted in 1943, spending 14 weeks on the Billboard magazine charts, peaking at position number 1 for the week of May 29.
- The Margaret Whiting recording (with the Freddie Slack Orchestra, which got top billing on the label) was released by Capitol Records as catalog number 126. It charted in 1943, spending a week at number 10 on the Billboard chart.
- The Sammy Davis Jr. recording was released by Decca Records as catalog number 29541. It charted in 1955 and spent six weeks on the Billboard charts, peaking at position number 16.
- The duet recorded by Louis Prima and Keely Smith was released as a single in 1958 on the Capitol label. It reached a peak of 18 on the Billboard Hot 100. This particular version was performed on Sam and Friends by Sam and Kermit the Frog, Sam performing as Prima and Kermit dressing in drag and performing as Smith. This sequence became one of the most well-known episodes of Sam and Friends.
- Bobby Rydell had his version released as a single on Cameo in 1961. It reached number 21 on the Hot 100, and number 13 in Canada with co-chart "Don't Be Afraid".
- Frank Sinatra recorded studio versions in 1946, with Alex Stordhal for Columbia – later released as a single – and in 1961, for Capitol, with Billy May for the album Come Swing With Me.

== Popular culture ==
- Marilyn Monroe famously sang the song in her film Bus Stop (1956). Her character Chérie is singing the song (somewhat out of key) to an audience who is not listening and talking loudly, until Don Murray quiets them all down.
- The song appears several times in Star Trek: Voyager. In the 1998 episode "The Killing Game", Seven of Nine sings the song in character in a World War II–themed holodeck program, and in the 2000 season six episode "Virtuoso", The Doctor sings the song along with Harry Kim's band, the Kimtones.
