= Virtuoso (Star Trek: Voyager) =

- Star Trek: Voyager episode
- Episode no.: Season 6 Episode 13
- Directed by: Les Landau
- Story by: Raf Green
- Teleplay by: Raf Green; Kenneth Biller
- Production code: 234
- Original air date: January 26, 2000

Guest appearances
- Kamala Lopez-Dawson – Tincoo; Ray Xifo – Abarca; Paul Williams – Koru; Marie Caldare – Azen; Nina Magnesson – Vinka; Paris Themmen – Fawning Fan

Episode chronology
| ← Previous "Blink of an Eye" | Next → "Memorial" |
- Star Trek: Voyager season 6

"Virtuoso" is the 13th episode of the sixth season of the science fiction television series Star Trek: Voyager, 133rd episode overall. It was aired on January 26, 2000, on United Paramount Network (UPN). USS Voyager, the fictional starship and the show's primary setting, is making its way slowly back to Earth from the other side of the Galaxy when they encounter Qomar aliens. These advanced aliens are intrigued by the singing abilities of The Doctor (played by cast regular Robert Picardo), indeed by music itself which despite their advanced technology they have not yet discovered.

This episode was directed by Les Landau, with a teleplay by Raf Green and Kenneth Biller from a story by Raf Green. This episode includes the Voyager band "Harry Kim and the Kimtones", which have a brief performance in the episode.

== Plot ==
Voyager encounters a technologically advanced race called the Qomar, and renders aid after a Qomar crew suffers minor injuries from a reaction with Voyager's scanners. The Qomar are extremely arrogant and dismissive to everyone, and dislike the Doctor simply for being a holographic entity. However, once the Qomar happen to hear the Doctor singing, they are immediately enthralled by him, since they never conceived the concept of music.

When the Doctor explains how music is used and how many others on the ship can perform it naturally, the Qomar invite the Voyager crew to their home system—previously off limits to outsiders—to learn more about music. The Voyager crew discover thousands of subspace channels encrypted in many ways, and tons of traffic just above the home world. The Qomar decide to transmit the Doctor's singing planet-wide, and make him a star. This accentuates his vanity, making him unpopular with his friends on Voyager. He asks to leave so he can pursue his music career on the planet. This causes more anger, as the crew believes they need his medical skills and have grown to love him as a member of the crew.

The Doctor protests, even preparing Paris to take over his position, and severely upsetting Seven of Nine, who feels like she is being abandoned. However, the aliens replace him with an upgraded singing hologram capable of a greater vocal range. The Doctor's hopes for a new life are dashed. In the end, the Doctor realizes they simply wanted him for his singing, not who he is as a sentient entity. The Voyager crew welcome him back, as symbolized by Seven delivering him a fan letter praising his talent and personality, signed by Seven of Nine.

== Casting ==
"Virtuoso" includes several guest stars, including Kamala Lopez-Dawson, Ray Xifo, Paul Williams, Marie Caldare, and Nina Magnesson.

See also List of Star Trek Voyager cast members

== Production ==
The shot of the Qomar homeworld is the same one previously used in the beginning of the episode "Year of Hell."

The background the Doctor orders for his recital is based on the one from the Teatro alla Scala's set for the opera Pagliacci.

== Reception ==
In 2020, The Digital Fix described "Virtuoso" as a "fun episode" that allowed actor Robert Picardo to show off his singing.

== Releases ==
This episode was released as part of a season 6 DVD boxset on December 7, 2004.

== See also ==
- "I've Been Working on the Railroad", the song whose first verse the Doctor sings in the episode.
- "Rondine al nido" ("Swallow's Nest"), voice over by tenor Agostino Castagnola as The Doctor (EMH) portrayed by Robert Picardo.
- "That Old Black Magic", Played at first by Ensign Harry Kim and then after a chanting request from the audience, it is also sung by the Doctor.
