= Rondine al nido =

Musical work of the Italian composer Vincenzo de Crescenzo

Song
- Language: Italian
- English title: "Swallow's Nest"
- Written: 1926
- Genre: Romance song
- Composer: Vincenzo de Crescenzo
- Lyricist: Luigi Sica

Rondine al nido is a romance and one of the best known works of the Italian composer Vincenzo de Crescenzo, whose music was in the repertoire of Beniamino Gigli, Tito Schipa, Giuseppe Di Stefano, Richard Tucker, Luciano Pavarotti, Luigi Infantino, Ramón Vargas, Robert Dean Smith, Francesco Albanese, among many others.

Written by de Crescenzo in the early 20th century (1926), it deals with lost love. While written and performed as a Neapolitan song, but with lyrics in Italian, it is more like an aria of the late Romantic period, demanding of the singer high intensity, high notes, and excellent breath control. It begins calmly and lightly, and then it becomes a passionate outburst. The second stanza repeats this scheme.

The song was sung by tenor Agostino Castagnola as The Doctor (EMH) portrayed by Robert Picardo in the 13th episode, Virtuoso, of the sixth season of the science fiction television series Star Trek: Voyager. The episode was first aired on 26 January 2000 in the United States. The song is performed in Las Vegas at the fountains of Bellagio, which dances to Luciano Pavarotti's version of the song.

Rondine al Nido is also the title of a short story by Claire Vaye Watkins, from her collection Battleborn.

== Lyrics ==
Every performer interprets the song in his own way and there have been several changes from version to version. The following version is from the booklet of the 1990 album, Carreras Domingo Pavarotti in Concert.

Italian

I
Sotto la gronda de la torre antica
Una rondine amica,
Allo sbocciare del mandorlo è tornata.
Ritorna tutti gli anni,
Sempre alla stessa data,
Monti e mare essa varca
per tornar.
Solo amore
Quando fugge e va lontano
Speri invano
E non torni più,
Speri invano
E non torni più.

II
Nella penombra dolce della sera
Passa la primavera.
Cinguettano le rondini nel volo,
Ebbre di luce e d'aria.
Ed io son triste e solo;
Monti e mare tu non varchi
per tornar.
Mia piccina,
Fosti tutta la mia vita;
Sei fuggita
E non torni più.
Sei fuggita
E non torni più.

Translation in English

I
Under the eaves of the old tower,
as the almond tree blossoms,
a friendly swallow has returned.
Every year she returns,
always in the same day.
She crosses mountains and sea
to get back here.
Only love flees
and does not return.
It makes you hope in vain,
but it does not return.
It makes you hope in vain,
but it does not return.

II
In the soft twilight of evening
springtime is passing.
The swallows chatter in their flight —
they are drunk with light and air.
But I am sad and lonely.
You do not cross mountains and sea
to come back to me.
My little one,
You were my whole life,
but you ran away,
never to return.
You ran away,
never to return!

== Selected recordings ==
The following is a selection of recordings that includes "Rondine al nido" sung by some of its most famous interpreters. Recordings are listed in chronological order by year.

Year	Album
1984	Mamma: Performers: Luciano Pavarotti (tenor), Andrea Griminelli (flute) and Henry Mancini (piano); Conductor and Ensemble: Henry Mancini and his Chorus and Orchestra; Released: 1984; 13 November 2007 (reissue); Recorded: 17–21, 29 January 1984 Gran Casino, Noga Hilton, Geneva; Label: London / Decca; Notes: "Rondine al nido" features on track 12.
1990	O Sole Mio: Performer: Beniamino Gigli; Conductor: Nathaniel Shilkret; Released: 6 March 1990; Label: EMI; Notes: "Rondine al nido" features on track 16.
1990	Carreras Domingo Pavarotti in Concert: Performers: José Carreras, Plácido Domingo and Luciano Pavarotti; Conductor: Zubin Mehta; Ensembles: Orchestra del Maggio Musicale Fiorentino and Orchestra del Teatro dell'Opera di Roma; Released: 1990; Recorded: 7 July 1990 Baths of Caracalla, Rome; Label: Decca; Notes: "Rondine al nido" features on track 5 sung by Pavarotti; released in Audio CD and DVD-Video formats.
1990	Luciano Pavarotti in Concert: Performers: Luciano Pavarotti (tenor) and Andrea Griminelli (flute); Conductor: Emerson Buckley; Ensemble: Emilia Romagna Arturo Toscanini Symphony Orchestra; Released: 25 October 1990; Recorded: 14 August 1985 Piazza Grande, Modena, Italy; Label: CBS; Notes: "Rondine al nido" features on track 7.
1991	Gigli in Song: Performer: Beniamino Gigli; Released: 9 January 1991; Label: Pearl; Notes: "Rondine al nido" features on track 16.
1993	Pavarotti in Central Park: Performers: Luciano Pavarotti (tenor) and Andrea Griminelli (flute); Conductor: Leone Magiera; Ensembles: Boys Choir of Harlem and New York Philharmonic members; Released: 1993; 7 March 1995 (reissue); Recorded: 26 June 1993 Central Park, New York City; Label: Decca; Notes: "Rondine al nido" features on track 13; released in Audio CD and DVD-Video formats.
1994	Celebri melodie italiane: Performers: Gino Bechi; Released: 27 September 1994; Label: RCA; Notes: "Rondine al nido" features on track 14.
1998	Momenti del 900: Performers: Simone Alaimo; Released: 1 November 1998; Label: Agora Musica; Notes: "Rondine al nido" features on track 5.
2000	Star Trek: Voyager – Virtuoso: Released: 2000; 26 January 2000; Recorded: January 2000; Label: Virtuoso; Notes: "Rondine al nido" features in UPN's Star Trek: Voyager episode "Virtuoso", with voice over by tenor Agostino Castagnola as EMH (The Doctor) portrayed by Robert Picardo. "
2001	Neapolitan Café: Ensemble: Quartetto Gelato; Released: 2001; 22 November 2005 (reissue); Label: Linus Entertainment; Notes: "Rondine al nido" features on track 12.
2002	Das Ist Dein Tag: Performers: German Tenors; Released: 21 June 2002; Label: Koch Records; Notes: "Rondine al nido" features on track 6.
2005	Favourite Flavours: Performers: Peter De Sotto (tenor), Cynthia Steljes (oboe), Joseph Macerollo (accordion) and George Meanwell (cello); Ensemble: Quartetto Gelato; Released: 8 November 2005; Label: Koch; Notes: "Rondine al nido" features on track 7 arranged by Shelly Berger.
2007	Ready for More: Performers: Michael Amante; Released: 2007; Label: Agora Musica; Notes: "Rondine al nido" features on track 11.
2007	My Love Songs, Forever: Performers: Palmerio Piras; Released: 30 May 2007; Label: Three Monkeys Music; Notes: "Rondine al nido" features on track 2.
2010	Romanze dell'800: Performers: Claudio Villa; Released: 2010; Label: Fonit Cetra WMI; Notes: "Rondine al nido" features on track 10.
2011	A Napoli: Performers: Marc Hervieux; Released: 2011; Label: ATMA Classique; Notes: "Rondine al nido" features on track 7.
