= The Horus Heresy =

Science fantasy novel series

- Author: Various
- Illustrator: Various (List of artists)
- Cover artist: Neil Roberts; Philip Sibbering
- Country: United Kingdom
- Language: English
- Genre: Science fantasy
- Publisher: Black Library
- Published: 2006–2024
- No. of books: 65
- Website: https://www.blacklibrary.com/the-horus-heresy

The Horus Heresy is a series of science fantasy novels set in the fictional Warhammer 40,000 setting of tabletop miniatures wargame company Games Workshop. Penned by several authors, the series takes place during the Horus Heresy, a fictional galaxy-spanning civil war occurring in the 31st millennium, 10,000 years before the main setting of Warhammer 40,000. The war is described as a major contributing factor to the game's dystopian environment.

The books are published in several media by the Black Library, a Games Workshop division, with the first title released in April 2006. The series consists of 65 published volumes; the concluding story, The End and the Death, was released in three volumes, with the concluding volume of the series, The End and the Death: Volume III, being released in January 2024.

The series has developed into a distinct and successful product line for the Black Library; titles have often appeared in bestseller lists, and overall the work has received critical approval despite reservations. It is an established, definitive component of Games Workshop's Horus Heresy sub-brand, and authoritative source material for the entire Warhammer 40,000 shared universe and its continuing development. A sequel series, The Scouring, began publication in December 2025.

The popularity of the novel series contributed to the development of The Horus Heresy as a tabletop wargame spin-off of the Warhammer 40,000 miniature wargame, launched by Games Workshop's subsidiary Forge World in 2012. Initially it was a specialist game supported through a series of campaign and army books detailing the events of the conflict, alongside a dedicated range of resin miniatures. The game later evolved into a standalone system with its own ruleset and product line, and was relaunched as Warhammer: The Horus Heresy in 2022. Furthermore, publisher Cubicle 7 announced The Horus Heresy Tabletop role-playing game to be released in 2026.

== Overview ==
The Horus Heresy is a dark, far-future military space opera concerning a galactic civil war within the nascent Imperium of Man, and which constitutes a cornerstone event of the dystopian science fantasy Warhammer 40,000 universe. The Horus Heresy is presented as a major chapter of conflict in the Warhammer 40,000 lore: it is caused by a Chaos plot to foil the Imperium's leader and founder, the mysterious Emperor of Mankind, by fomenting rebellion and internecine warfare in the expanding Imperium of Man. The story focuses on the Emperor's 18 genetically engineered sons, the Primarchs, and the legions of genetically enhanced superhuman soldiers that they lead, the Legiones Astartes, which find themselves divided into loyalist and traitor factions as they struggle for victory.

The shared universe was originally created in 1987 by Games Workshop, parent company of series publisher Black Library, as the campaign setting for the Warhammer 40,000 tabletop miniatures wargame and in 2006 Black Library began publishing The Horus Heresy series. The series consists of full-length novels, and novel-length compilations of novellas or short stories, written by a number of authors. The series includes new characters as well as establishing the background of previously established Warhammer 40,000 characters who play an important role in the post-Heresy fictional universe.

The first three novels in The Horus Heresy are an opening book trilogy. This trilogy presents some of the background and causes of the Heresy, and describes the start of the conflict. The arc's focus is on Warmaster Horus, the principal antagonist, and covers about two years in the overall Heresy timeline; most of this period elapses before the rebellion begins. Following the trilogy, the narrative is not strictly sequential and is often presented in nonlinear fashion from book to book. Apart from the initial trilogy, the stories often concern events that happen earlier or later than their position in the series would suggest, or may include time periods already covered in other series titles.

The majority of stories in The Horus Heresy are set around the start of the fictional universe's 31st millennium, in contrast to most Warhammer 40,000 material, which takes place in the 41st millennium. The stories in The Horus Heresy routinely cover the conflict's background, with some going back centuries before the war (and the 31st millennium) begins. In narrower scope, the entire conflict (including the Heresy proper and its proximate formative period), is depicted as having lasted for seven years. With few exceptions, the sequence and dating of Heresy events is implied rather than stated in The Horus Heresy stories.

== Titles ==
The following lists pertain to regular or general-availability UK first editions. For special and other editions, and additional information, see § Media and editions.

Book	Title	Author	Release date	Length
1	Horus Rising; The seeds of heresy are sown	Dan Abnett	April 2006 (paperback) 978-1-84416-294-9; November 2010 (e-book); January 2011 (audiobook) 978-1-84970-016-0	412 pp.
2	False Gods; The heresy takes root	Graham McNeill	June 2006 (paperback) 978-1-84416-370-0; December 2010 (e-book); July 2011 (audiobook)	406 pp.
3	Galaxy in Flames; The heresy revealed	Ben Counter	October 2006 (paperback) 978-1-84416-393-9; December 2010 (e-book); January 2012 (audiobook)	407 pp.
4	The Flight of the Eisenstein; The heresy unfolds	James Swallow	March 2007 (paperback) 978-1-84416-459-2; December 2010 (e-book); December 2012 (audiobook)	407 pp.
5	Fulgrim; Visions of Treachery	Graham McNeill	July 2007 (paperback) 978-1-84416-476-9; December 2010 (e-book); April 2013 (audiobook)	510 pp.
6	Descent of Angels; Loyalty and honour	Mitchel Scanlon	October 2007 (paperback) 978-1-84416-508-7; December 2010 (e-book); May 2013 (audiobook)	413 pp.
7	Legion; Secrets and lies	Dan Abnett	March 2008 (paperback) 978-1-84416-536-0; December 2010 (e-book); February 2014 (audiobook)	412 pp.
8	Battle for the Abyss; My brother, my enemy	Ben Counter	August 2008 (paperback) 978-1-84416-657-2; December 2010 (e-book)	411 pp.
9	Mechanicum; Knowledge is power	Graham McNeill	December 2008 (paperback) 978-1-84416-664-0; December 2010 (e-book)	415 pp.
10	Tales of Heresy [Short story compilation]	Nick Kyme and Lindsey Priestley (editors)	April 2009 (paperback) 978-1-84416-683-1; December 2010 (e-book)	412 pp.
11	Fallen Angels; Deceit and betrayal	Mike Lee	July 2009 (paperback) 978-1-84416-729-6; December 2010 (e-book); July 2013 (audiobook)	412 pp.
12	A Thousand Sons; All is dust...	Graham McNeill	March 2010 (paperback) 978-1-84416-809-5; November 2010 (audiobook, e-book)	558 pp.
13	Nemesis; War within the shadows	James Swallow	August 2010 (paperback) 978-1-84416-869-9; December 2010 (e-book)	507 pp.
14	The First Heretic; Fall to Chaos	Aaron Dembski-Bowden	November 2010 (e-book, paperback 978-1-84416-885-9)	502 pp.
15	Prospero Burns; The Wolves unleashed	Dan Abnett	December 2010 (audiobook, e-book); January 2011 (paperback) 978-1-84416-777-7	444 pp.
16	Age of Darkness [Short story compilation]	Christian Dunn (editor)	May 2011 (audiobook, e-book, paperback 978-1-84970-037-5)	408 pp.
17	The Outcast Dead; The truth lies within	Graham McNeill	November 2011 (audiobook, e-book, paperback 978-1-84970-086-3)	459 pp.
18	Deliverance Lost; Ghosts of Terra	Gav Thorpe	January 2012 (audiobook, e-book, paperback 978-1-84970-062-7)	469 pp.
19	Know No Fear; The battle of Calth	Dan Abnett	February 2012 (audiobook, e-book); March 2012 (paperback) 978-1-84970-134-1	412 pp.
20	The Primarchs [Novella compilation]	Christian Dunn (editor)	May 2012 (audiobook, e-book); June 2012 (paperback) 978-1-84970-208-9	440 pp.
21	Fear to Tread; The angel falls	James Swallow	August 2012 (audiobook, e-book, paperback 978-1-84970-196-9)	508 pp.
22	Shadows of Treachery [Short story and novella compilation]	Christian Dunn and Nick Kyme (editors)	September 2012 (e-book, paperback 978-1-84970-346-8)	409 pp.
23	Angel Exterminatus; Flesh and iron	Graham McNeill	November 2012 (audiobook); January 2013 (e-book, paperback 978-1-84970-358-1)	416 pp.
24	Betrayer; Blood for the Blood God	Aaron Dembski-Bowden	December 2012 (audiobook); March 2013 (paperback) 978-1-84970-388-8	448 pp.
25	Mark of Calth [Short story and novella compilation]	Laurie Goulding (editor)	April 2013 (audiobook, paperback 978-1-84970-415-1)	416 pp.
26	Vulkan Lives; Unto the Anvil	Nick Kyme	August 2013 (audiobook, e-book, hardback 978-1-84970-316-1, paperback 978-1-84970-512-7)	416 pp.
27	The Unremembered Empire; A light in the darkness	Dan Abnett	October 2013 (e-book, hardback 978-1-84970-571-4, paperback 978-1-84970-572-1)	416 pp.
28	Scars; A Legion divided	Chris Wraight	April 2014 (e-book, hardback, paperback 978-1-84970-604-9)	416 pp.
29	Vengeful Spirit; The Battle of Molech	Graham McNeill	May 2014 (e-book, Audiobook, hardback, paperback 978-1-84970-595-0)	416 pp.
30	The Damnation of Pythos; Thinning the veil	David Annandale	July 2014 (e-book, hardback 978-1-84970-714-5, audio)	416 pp.
31	Legacies of Betrayal; Let the galaxy burn	Compilation	February 2015 (e-book, paperback 978-1-84970-836-4)	416 pp.
32	Deathfire; Into the Ruinstorm	Nick Kyme	November 2015 (e-book, paperback 978-1-78496-018-6, audio)	416 pp.
33	War Without End; Heresy begets retribution	Compilation	January 2016 (e-book, hardback 978-1-78496-365-1 and audio); July 2016 (paperback) 978-1-78496-370-5	544 pp.
34	Pharos; The dying of the light	Guy Haley	December 2015 (ebook); February 2016 (hardback and audio); September 2016 (paperback) 978-1-78496-306-4	485 pp.
35	Eye of Terra; I am the Emperor's vigilance	Compilation	March 2016 (ebook, hardback and audio); October 2016 (paperback) 978-1-78496-455-9	416 pp.
36	The Path of Heaven; Riding out from the storm	Chris Wraight	April 2016 (ebook, hardback and audio); November 2016 (paperback) 978-1-78496-312-5	432 pp.
37	The Silent War; Chosen of the Sigillite	Compilation	May 2016 (ebook, hardback and audio); December 2016 (paperback) 978-1-78496-375-0	480 pp.
38	Angels of Caliban; Emperors and slaves	Gav Thorpe	June 2016 (ebook, hardback and audio); December 2016 (paperback) 978-1-78496-348-4	480 pp.
39	Praetorian of Dorn; Alpha to omega	John French	August 2016 (ebook, hardback and audio); January 2017 (paperback) 978-1-78496-437-5	512 pp.
40	Corax; Nevermore	Gav Thorpe	October 2016 (ebook, hardback and audio); April 2017 (paperback) 978-1-78496-504-4	416 pp.
41	The Master of Mankind; War in the webway	Aaron Dembski-Bowden	December 2016 (ebook, hardback and audio); June 2017 (paperback) 978-1-78496-536-5	416 pp.
42	Garro; Weapon of fate	James Swallow	February 2017 (ebook, hardback and audio); August 2017 (paperback) 978-1-78496-564-8	384 pp.
43	Shattered Legions [Short story and novella compilation]	Laurie Goulding (editor)	April 2017 (ebook, hardback and audio); October 2017 (paperback) 978-1-78496-784-0	448 pp.
44	The Crimson King; A soul divided	Graham McNeill	June 2017 (ebook, hardback and audio); December 2017 (paperback) 978-1-78496-834-2	496 pp.
45	Tallarn; War for a dead world	John French	August 2017 (ebook, hardback and audio); February 2018 (paperback) 978-1-78496-640-9	416 pp.
46	Ruinstorm; Destiny unwritten...	David Annandale	October 2017 (ebook, hardback and audio); April 2018 (paperback) 978-1-78496-672-0	384 pp.
47	Old Earth; To the Gates of Terra	Nick Kyme	November 2017 (ebook, hardback and audio); June 2018 (paperback) 978-1-78496-712-3	400 pp.
48	The Burden of Loyalty [Short story and novella compilation]	Laurie Goulding (editor)	February 2018 (ebook, hardback and audio); August 2018 (paperback) 978-1-78496-752-9	432 pp.
49	Wolfsbane; The wyrd spear cast	Guy Haley	May 2018 (ebook, hardback and audio); October 2018 (paperback) 978-1-78496-779-6	432 pp.
50	Born of Flame [Short story, novella, & novel compilation]	Nick Kyme	July 2018 (ebook, hardback and audio); December 2018 (paperback) 978-1-78496-838-0	464 pp.
51	Slaves to Darkness; Chaos undivided	John French	August 2018 (ebook, hardback and audio); February 2019 (paperback) 978-1-78496-859-5	400 pp.
52	Heralds of the Siege [Short story compilation]	Nick Kyme and Laurie Goulding (editors)	November 2018 (ebook, hardback and audio); April 2019 (paperback) 978-1-78496-906-6	400 pp.
53	Titandeath; The God Machines cometh	Guy Haley	December 2018 (ebook, hardback and audio); June 2019 (paperback) 978-1-78496-988-2	369 pp.
54	The Buried Dagger; Doom of the Death Guard	James Swallow	February 2019 (ebook, hardback and audio); September 2019 (paperback) 978-1-78193-970-3	314 pp.
55	The Solar War; Siege of Terra Book 1	John French	May 2019 (ebook, hardback 978-1-78496-926-4 and audio); November 2020 (paperback) 978-1-78999-290-8	384 pp.
56	The Lost and the Damned; Siege of Terra Book 2	Guy Haley	October 2019 (ebook, hardback 978-1-78193-944-4 and audio); April 2020 (paperback) 978-1-78999-074-4	432 pp.
57	The First Wall; Siege of Terra Book 3	Gav Thorpe	March 2020 (ebook, hardback 978-1-78193-932-1 and audio); August 2020 (paperback) 978-1-78999-177-2	460 pp.
58	Saturnine; Siege of Terra Book 4	Dan Abnett	July 2020 (ebook, hardback 978-1-78999-134-5 and audio); March 2022 (paperback) 978-1-80026-113-6	560 pp.
59	Mortis; Siege of Terra Book 5	John French	April 2021 (ebook, hardback 978-1-78999-816-0 and audio); January 2023 (paperback) 978-1-80026-246-1	560 pp.
60	Warhawk; Siege of Terra Book 6	Chris Wraight	October 2021 (ebook and hardback 978-1-78999-952-5); April 2023 (paperback) 978-1-78999-387-5	480 pp.
61	Echoes of Eternity; Siege of Terra Book 7	Aaron Dembski-Bowden	September 2022 (ebook and hardback 978-1-80026-088-7); June 2023 (paperback) 978-1-80026-195-2	560 pp.
62	The End and the Death, Volume I Siege of Terra Book 8	Dan Abnett	February 2023 (ebook and hardback 978-1-80026-120-4); August 2023 (paperback) 978-1-80407-337-7	663 pp.
63	The End and the Death, Volume II; Siege of Terra Book 9	Dan Abnett	November 2023 (ebook and hardback 978-1-80026-878-4)	672 pp.
64	The End and the Death, Volume III; Siege of Terra Book 10	Dan Abnett	January 2024 (ebook and hardback 978-1-80407-488-6)	512 pp.

=== Sequel: The Scouring ===
Book	Title	Author	Release date	Length
1	Ashes of the Imperium; The Scouring Book 1	Chris Wraight	December 2025 (ebook and hardback 978-1-80026-268-3)	512 pp.

== Contributors ==
Contributors of the series include artists, audiobook narrators, and compilation or abridgement editors. Each may have contributed in stories that utilise different forms; where applicable, the number of (multiple) contributions per form – or other pertinent information – is indicated in parentheses.

Artists

- Karl Richardson – Internal illustrations ("premium" editions)
- Neil Roberts – Cover art, front matter illustration; main series artist (all titles except where cited otherwise)
- Philip Sibbering – Cover art, front matter illustration
- Adrian Wood – Front matter map

Audiobook narrators

- Gareth Armstrong – Unabridged novel (4), novella (2), short story (4)
- Sean Barrett – Novella
- Martyn Ellis – Abridged (3) and unabridged (1) novel, short story (3)
- Jonathan Keeble – Unabridged novel (3), novella, short story (6)
- David Timpson – Unabridged novel (2), novella, short story (3)
- Toby Longworth - Unabridged Novel

Editors

- Christian Dunn – Novel abridgement (3); mixed-form compilation, novella compilation, short story compilation
- Laurie Goulding – Mixed-form compilation
- Nick Kyme – Mixed-form compilation, short story compilation
- Lindsey Priestley – Short story compilation

== Synopsis ==
=== Story setting ===
Early in the 31st millennium, the Galaxy is in the throes of the Great Crusade. Originating from Terra (Earth), it is an interstellar crusade that claims the galaxy as the rightful domain of Humankind, and aims to reunite the multitude of scattered human colonies remaining from earlier space exploration under the domain of an "Imperium of Man". Organised in numerous expeditions, the Crusade fields huge fleets and vast armies; at its forefront, led by the Primarchs, are Legions of Space Marines – genetically enhanced supersoldiers numbering in the millions. Over the course of two Terran centuries, the Crusade has reached star systems more than 50,000 light years away from its original staging point in the Sol (Solar) System, has assimilated millions of worlds into the Imperium, and has given Humankind a dominant position among the galaxy's species. Its grand mastermind is the "Emperor of Mankind", a mysterious superhuman of unknown origin.

The Emperor, founder and head of the Imperium, is a being of towering charisma, prowess, conviction, and ability. He has declared an atheistic worldview, the "Imperial Truth", which promotes science, rationalism, and human primacy. Unknown to the common citizenry, he is also the most powerful human (or humanlike) psychic, referred to as psykers, and is overall one of the most formidable psychics in the galaxy. Officially, the Imperium denies the existence of psychic phenomena, including its manifestations as witchcraft and sorcery, and punishes its belief as ignorant and superstitious; yet the Imperium is also dependent on psychic activity in order to achieve faster-than-light travel between its scattered dominions. The Emperor knows that psychic phenomena originate in The Warp, a parallel dimension reflecting the events of the material world at its most emotional. Within the Warp exist Daemons, sentient vortices of concentrated feeling that are chiefly malignant. The Daemons are themselves in service to the Chaos Gods, also known as the Ruinous Powers, titanic collectives of dark will whose rulership over the parallel dimension is supreme. These malign immaterial entities forever seek to breach the material universe and subject all life within it to foul and debased whims. Awareness and perception of the Chaos Gods and their Daemons serves as the basis of numerous faiths and religions in the setting, both human and alien in origin. Knowing followers of the Chaos Gods, though rare, refer to their faith as the Primordial Truth, or the Primordial Annihilator.

Humankind's continuing biological and psycho-spiritual evolution includes the gradual development of widespread Warp-related psychic abilities that will make the species far more susceptible to Chaotic influence; united under the Imperium of Man, the Emperor seeks to protect all of mankind by using faith in the Imperial Truth as a shield. The powers of Chaos desire change and conflict by nature, and seek to destabilise and subvert the Imperium's order over the galaxy from within.

=== Book 1 to Book 10 ===
1. Horus Rising: The seeds of heresy are sown

Horus Rising (Abnett 2006), the series opener, starts in the early years of the 31st millennium, during the 203rd year of the Great Crusade. It describes the rise to power of Horus Lupercal, Primarch of the "Luna Wolves" Legion of Space Marines, and the most versatile and favoured "son" of the Emperor. The Emperor has recently appointed him Warmaster, overall commander of Imperial military forces, while also leaving him in charge of the rest of the Crusade; the Emperor meanwhile returns to Terra, where in relative isolation he undertakes a secret project to which not even Horus is privy. The focus and perspective of the novel centres on a Space Marine Captain, Garviel Loken, leader of the Luna Wolves' 10th Company. He becomes a member of the Mournival, an informal advisory body to Horus, and participates in Crusade campaigns against anti-Imperial human populations and aliens, referred to in the series as "xenos". The story also hints at tensions in the nascent Imperium, exacerbated by the Emperor's absence and contentious actions and inactions – these are common themes in following books.

2. False Gods: The heresy takes root

False Gods (McNeill 2006) picks up a few weeks after the conclusion of Horus Rising in the series timeline, and tells the story of Horus' fall. In a complicated conspiracy implemented by followers of Chaos, Horus is mortally wounded during a Crusade mission by a Chaos-tainted xenos weapon. In a desperate action by his lieutenants to ensure his survival – one taken in strict contradiction to Imperial doctrine – Horus is brought to a local temple with a reputation for healing. The temple is the seat of a powerful Chaos cult, and both Horus' wound and its supposed healing makes him susceptible to Chaos' influence. He ultimately turns against his "father", the Emperor, and sets in motion the entire Heresy. This novel further highlights the institutional and personal tensions that accompany the Imperium's maturity into the preeminent power of the galaxy; they include rifts among the Primarchs, as well as both between and within their Space Marine Legions. Conflicts and characters flaws are repeatedly and effectively manipulated by Chaos in pursuit of their agenda throughout the series. A parallel storyline, also present in several other books, involves the growing influence – both within the Crusade Expeditionary forces and across the wider Imperium – of a forbidden religious cult, whose members, while loyal to the Emperor and Imperium, defy the Imperial Truth by worshipping the Emperor as a god.

3. Galaxy in Flames: The heresy revealed

Galaxy in Flames (Counter 2006) starts shortly after the end of False Gods. It outlines the corrupted Warmaster's descent into madness, which leads to the fomentation of his plot to betray the Imperium. Horus pursues his secret planning of the rebellion in earnest, seeking and finding allies among his disgruntled fellow Primarchs, their Legions, and the Imperium's other organisations and key personalities. The novel details the first open move of the Heresy, the "Betrayal of Isstvan III", wherein factions of four Astartes Legions who were deemed unconvertible by their traitor brethren are ambushed during a planetary invasion of the fictional Isstvan star system. The novel marks the first distinguishment of the "Loyalists" and "Traitor" factions within the Legions and other rebel forces, including the unmodified soldiers of the Imperial Army.

4. The Flight of the Eisenstein: The heresy unfolds

The Flight of the Eisenstein (Swallow 2007) follows the eponymous Eisenstein, a space frigate of the "Death Guard" 14th Legion of Space Marines. The story follows the ship's escape from the Betrayal of Isstvan III, crewed by surviving loyalists of the four Legions present at the battle and commanded by Battle‑Captain Nathaniel Garro of the Death Guard 7th Company and one of the few Commanders in the Traitor Legions that remain loyal to the Emperor – followed by the perilous voyage the vessel must take across the galaxy in an effort to reach Terra and raise the alarm over the developing rebellion. Garro and the others on board the vessel face suspicion and incredulity from Imperial authorities; apart from the inconceivable news of Horus' betrayal, the situation is complicated by the fact that many of the travellers on the Eisenstein now openly proclaim their belief in the Emperor's divinity, itself a heresy.

5. Fulgrim: Visions of Treachery

Fulgrim (McNeill 2007) centers on the eponymous Primarch of the 3rd Legion, the "Emperor's Children". Characterised as flamboyant perfectionists, the novel tracks the descent of Fulgrim and his Legion into the service of Chaos roughly simultaneously with that of Horus in (Book 2). Fulgrim is delivered a warning about Horus' imminent betrayal and the disaster that may follow by the alien Eldar race, but he and his staff dismiss it. The Emperor's Children eventually become the "Chosen" of Slaanesh, one of the four Gods of Chaos, with which Fulgrim is slowly and unwittingly drawn into grotesque communion. Primarch Ferrus Manus and his "Iron Hands" Space Marines (the 10th Legion) also play a prominent role in the novel as Fulgrim attempts to lure them into betrayal, and several other Primarchs and Legions make appearances. Described in passing is the pivotal Battle of Isstvaan V, also known as the Dropsite Massacre, where several entirely Loyalist Legions are slaughtered in another Traitor ambush in the Isstvan star system. The battle fully reveals the scale and ferocity of the rebellion.

6. Descent of Angels: Loyalty and honour

Descent of Angels (Scanlon 2007) is a pre-Heresy story that concludes about 50 years before the start of that conflict. It introduces the "Dark Angels", first of the Space Marine Legions, and their Primarch Lion El'Jonson. The story is mainly told from the viewpoint of Zahariel El'Zurias, a native of the fictional planet Caliban. Caliban is an isolated, low-technology world that resembles a feudal medieval fantasy setting. Zahariel is introduced in the story as an Aspirant of the Order, an organisation of techno-barbarian knights. The first half of the novel is set on Caliban and covers the final battles of the Order under the leadership of Jonson, the future Primarch. The book's second half describes Caliban's unification with the Imperium of Man as well as the actions of the Dark Angels during the early years of the Great Crusade. In this part of the story, Zahariel, selected as a candidate Space Marine, is accepted as a Dark Angel Neophyte. A future schism within the Legion is intimated towards the end of the book.

7. Legion: Secrets and lies

Legion (Abnett 2008) focuses on the "Alpha Legion", the 20th and last of the Space Marine Legions. Characterised in earlier publications as clandestine and inscrutable, the book constitutes a major development of the entire canon of the setting with the revelation that the Legion's Primarch is actually a pair of twins, Alpharius and Omegon. The book also features the Imperial Army, the regular unmodified human fighting force of the Imperium, covering several officers and their units. Lastly, the novel introduces a new organisation to the setting, the enigmatic and ancient Cabal – an interspecies organisation opposed to Chaos. The human John Grammaticus is introduced as a prominent Cabal member. The story takes place over roughly a 6‑month period, about two years before the Heresy starts; it describes the events that eventually lead Alpharius and Omegon (publicly a single figure named Alpharius Omegon) to support Horus.

8. Battle for the Abyss: My brother, my enemy

Battle for the Abyss (Counter 2008) concerns the lead‑up to a Traitor invasion of Ultramar, a remote star system and the home base of the unshakeably-Loyalist 13th Legion, the "Ultramarines" (Book 19 and 24). Early in the Heresy, the Traitor Word Bearers Legion is tasked with organising and leading the invasion; they plan to use an immense, secretly commissioned warship, the Furious Abyss, to spearhead the surprise attack. The vessel, commanded by Fleet Captain Zadkiel, launches from shipyards near Jupiter around the time of the events on Isstvan III (Book 3), and sets course for Macragge, Ultramar's capital world. Leading the cast of Loyalist protagonists is Cestus, Fleet Commander and Captain of the 7th Company of the Ultramarines. They become aware of the powerful capital ship's true purpose, and engage in long pursuit; they will seek to prevent the Furious Abyss from participating in the invasion and from reaching Macragge.

9. Mechanicum: Knowledge is power

Mechanicum (McNeill 2008) is the first book in the series not to focus on either the Primarchs or their Space Marines Legions. The novel centres on the eponymous "Mechanicum", a cult of machine-worshipping technologists based on the real-life planet Mars and which serves as the chief engineering authority in the nascent Imperium. The machinations of Horus and the Chaos-worshipping Traitors affects the Martian cult as much as every other Imperial organisation, leading to a civil war on Mars itself. Kelbor-Hal, Fabricator General of Mars and the technocracy's supreme leader, declares for Horus, and together they carry out a coup d'état to eliminate Techpriest and Magos adherents of the Cult who are loyal to Terra and the Emperor. As the Mechanicum is the sole power responsible for all civil and military technology in the Imperium, the conflict has vast implications for whichever side of the broader intergalactic civil war receives Mars' crucial support.

10. Tales of Heresy

Tales of Heresy (Kyme & Priestley 2009) is a collection of short stories introducing and expanding upon numerous threads within the greater happenings of the Heresy. Various stories centre on the Custodian Guard, the elite Praetorian Guard-esque retinue of the Emperor, and the Sisters of Silence, a classified Imperial organisation of anti-psychic warrior‑nuns originally introduced in Book 4. Most stories are concurrent with the Heresy, with some occurring in the years prior. It includes two stories that take place on Terra, one of which occurs long before the Heresy and adds to the background regarding the Imperial Truth; another entry in the compilation is a Primarch origin story, covering the contentious circumstances under which the gladiatorial Primarch Angron takes command of the 12th Space Marine Legion, which he renames from the "Warhounds" to the "World Eaters". The book contains seven stories by various authors; several stories relate to full-length novels in the series.

This anthology contains the following stories: Blood Games by Dan Abnett, Wolf at the Door by Mike Lee, Scions of the Storm by Anthony Reynolds, The Voice by James Swallow, Call of the Lion by Gav Thorpe, The Last Church by Graham McNeill and After Desh'ea by Matthew Farrer.

=== Book 11 to Book 20 ===
11. Fallen Angels: Deceit and betrayal

Fallen Angels (Lee 2009) continues the Dark Angels tale begun in Book 6, Descent of Angels. The novel starts around the time of Book 6's conclusion, about 50 years before the Heresy, but forwards to just about the time of the Heresy's beginning in the opening chapters. It tells two stories: one concerns the effort of Primarch Lion El'Jonson and a small group of Dark Angels to deny a forge world (a planet devoted to manufacturing, especially of weapons) to Horus' forces; the other is the story of Luther (Lion El'Jonson's second), Zahariel El'Zurias (by now a full Space Marine), and a Dark Angels contingent sent back to Caliban, the Dark Angels Legion home world. They get involved in the fight against a growing insurgency that seeks to free the planet from under the Imperium's thumb.

12. A Thousand Sons: All is dust...

A Thousand Sons (McNeill 2010) is the story of Primarch Magnus and the "Thousand Sons" Space Marines, the 15th Legion; it mainly takes place before the Heresy begins. Following a reprimand by the Emperor for dabbling in sorcery, Magnus and his Legion secretly continue to study the forbidden subjects. Then, around the time of Horus' corruption (Book 2), Magnus learns through sorcery of his brother's impending betrayal. He tries – again through sorcery – to warn the Emperor, believing that the gravity of the news justifies his disobedience. However, he overreaches with his powers and damages the vital and secret project the Emperor is undertaking (Book 1), endangering the safety of Terra itself in the process. The Emperor is enraged and orders Leman Russ, Primarch of the 6th Legion (the "Space Wolves"), to Prospero, the Thousand Sons Legion's in‑series home world. The Space Wolves, accompanied by other Imperial forces, are to bring Magnus and his Legion to Terra to account for themselves.

13. Nemesis: War within the shadows

Nemesis (Swallow 2010) is set about two years after the events on Isstvan V described in Book 5, Fulgrim. It is a look at the war behind the war, the covert operations undertaken by the opposing sides in order to influence the visible conflict. Specifically, it deals with a plan by a secret Imperial organisation, the Officio Assassinorum, to eliminate Horus; an "Execution Force" consisting of operatives from all of the Officio's disciplines, and led by top-rated sniper Eristede Kell, is tasked with the mission. There have been several previous unsuccessful attempts against Horus' life, and this gives a high-ranking officer of the Traitor Word Bearers Legion the idea to field a nemesis weapon of his own: a highly specialised assassin, who is to be used in an audacious scheme to kill the Emperor.

14. The First Heretic: Fall to Chaos

The First Heretic (Dembski-Bowden 2010a) details the fall to Chaos of Primarch Lorgar and the 17th Space Marine Legion, the "Word Bearers". Decades before the start of the rebellion they become heretics relative to the Imperial Truth by introducing religious worship. This results in public and humiliating censure of Lorgar and the entire assembled Legion, by the Emperor himself. The despairing Lorgar is subsequently swayed by two of his most trusted lieutenants, who are in secret allegiance with Chaos; eventually both Primarch and Legion covertly embrace (and promote) the Primordial Truth, many years before Horus' corruption. The story is largely told from the point of view of Argel Tal, a Captain of the Word Bearers, who becomes commander of a Chaos-possessed elite Legion unit. It spans several decades, starting 43 years before the events on Isstvan V (Book 5) and concluding around the time the Word Bearers are on their way to assault Calth (Book 19).

15. Prospero Burns: The Wolves unleashed

Prospero Burns (Abnett 2010) is part of the story arc of Book 12, however it follows a different but related timeline. The story begins more than a century before the Space Wolves-led mission to Prospero, and the concurrent start of the Heresy. It is presented from the point of view of Kasper Hawser, formerly a noted Terran academic who becomes a Crusade Remembrancer, and then the Oral Historian or skjald of the 3rd Company of the Space Wolves Legion. On the surface it is his story; the important understory concerns the long-term machinations of Chaos, whose aim is the destruction of both Space Wolves and Thousand Sons. Chaos attempts to exploit the weaknesses of the Primarchs and their Legions in order to pit them against each other – the ultimate result is the confrontation on Prospero. While this confrontation is taking place, Horus' previously covert rebellion becomes visible (Book 3). The novel also adds background to Horus' fall and to the planning of the Heresy campaign by Chaos and its forces.

16. Age of Darkness

Age of Darkness (Dunn 2011a) is a compilation of nine short stories by various authors. They take place during the seven‑year period between the Dropsite Massacre on Isstvan V (Book 5), and the conclusion of Horus' campaign. The stories present various facets of the unfolding conflict, as suspicion, insecurity, and paranoia spread through the galaxy on the wake of the Warmaster's betrayal. Subjects include: a Primarch prepares for the end of the Imperium; a Traitor PSYOP topples an Imperial planet; an unusual diplomatic contest will decide which side will be chosen by a world on the fence; a non-combatant may be a rebel agent or a herald of unpalatable truths for the Imperium; a Loyalist Space Marine in a Traitor Legion holds his own against his erstwhile brothers. Several of the included stories are linked through continuity; some are also prequels or sequels to stories in other series books.

This anthology contains the following stories: Rules of Engagement by Graham McNeill, Liar's Due by James Swallow, Forgotten Sons by Nick Kyme, The Last Remembrancer by John French, Rebirth by Chris Wraight, The Face of Treachery by Gav Thorpe, Little Horus by Dan Abnett, The Iron Within by Rob Sanders, Savage Weapons by Aaron Dembski-Bowden.

17. The Outcast Dead: The truth lies within

The Outcast Dead (McNeill 2011d) is the first novel-length story in the series to take place almost entirely on Terra. It covers a relatively short period, starting several months before Magnus' catastrophic psychic visit at the Imperial Palace (Book 12), and concluding several months after this event. The unauthorised visit is central to the story: apart from damaging the Emperor's top secret project (Book 1) and the planet's defense, it massively disrupts Terra's long-range communications infrastructure. The ensuing isolation and confusion cause indecision and delays for the Loyalist side. The story's main character is Kai Zulane, previously a gifted Imperial astropath attached to the Ultramarines Legion. He unwittingly becomes the keeper of a secret that could decide the victor in the developing galactic civil war. The secret has additional implications regarding the Heresy's conclusion and the future course of the Imperium of Man. "The Outcast Dead" are other protagonists: a small, disparate group of Space Marines suspected as traitors, with whom Zulane falls in during the second half of the book.

18. Deliverance Lost: Ghosts of Terra

Deliverance Lost (Thorpe 2012a) is mainly concerned with the actions of Primarch Corvus Corax and his Space Marine Command, the 19th Legion or "Raven Guard", during the year following the Dropsite Massacre (Book 5). However, operatives and the Primarch of the Alpha Legion play a prominent role. The story starts about 3 months after the Dropsite Massacre, with the unexpected rescue of Corax and the remnants of his Legion (at less than 5% strength due to casualties in that battle). Arriving at Terra a few months after the events described in The Outcast Dead take place, Corax convinces the Emperor to impart to him the knowledge and material that may accelerate the rebuilding of his Legion. The second part of the novel describes the effort to reconstitute the Raven Guard, undertaken on Deliverance (its home world in Warhammer 40,000 fiction), and the pursuit of opposite objectives by the Alpha Legion. The novel features the reappearance of The Cabal (Book 7), and of other well-known characters; it also adds information about the developing strategies and subterfuge applied by the opposing sides, including reasons for Horus' timetable and for the Emperor's actions during the initial stages of the Heresy.

19. Know No Fear: The battle of Calth

Know No Fear (Abnett 2012) documents the rebels' surprise assault on Calth, an ascendant Ultramar system world. It is planned and led by the Traitor Word Bearers Legion, now fully and openly committed to the spread of the Primordial Truth. The narrative starts close to where the timelines of Book 8 and Book 14 converge (in their respective conclusions), with the invasion force en route to, or near the planet. The rebel mission has aims beyond just delivering a crippling blow to the Ultramarines Legion and their home system; its objectives may affect the entire Heresy campaign. The story tracks the Calth assault from its opening covert phases, and the actions of several characters. Unaware of the developing rebellion and the Word Bearers' true role and allegiance, Primarch Roboute Guilliman and his Ultramarines are unprepared for the underhand invasion: it is total, bloody war, with ritualistic undertones, scorched earth tactics, decisive use of technology, and the considerable involvement of Chaos; the inconceivable treachery and its implications forever change the Loyalists' view of reality.

20. The Primarchs

The Primarchs (Dunn 2012a) is a compilation of four novellas by different authors, each story starring one of the "sons" of the Emperor. The novellas further develop these characters, who make multiple appearances in the series: following the Dropsite Massacre (Book 5), Fulgrim, perversely empowered by his own corruption, reveals his true nature and future plans to top officers of his compromised Legion; during a Great Crusade campaign against the enigmatic Eldar, Ferrus Manus, already beset by unsettling dreams, is subjected by alien sorcerers to stark, portentous visions and warnings about his future and role in the soon to be revealed Heresy; with Horus' rebellion in full swing after the events of Isstvan V, a suspicious and isolated Lion El'Jonson accepts the newly revealed realities of the Warp and decides on an independent course of action for the Dark Angels in the unfolding conflict; around the same time, and plotting a typically indecipherable course in the expanding war, the twinned Primarch of the Alpha Legion is involved in a unique counterintelligence operation that extends the Legion's customary deceptions inwards.

This anthology contains the following stories: The Reflection Crack'd by Graham McNeill, Feat of Iron by Nick Kyme, The Lion by Gav Thorpe and The Serpent Beneath by Rob Sanders.

=== Book 21 to Book 30 ===
21. Fear to Tread: The angel falls

Fear to Tread (Swallow 2012b) describes an operation by the forces of Chaos that is supposed to turn Primarch Sanguinius and the 9th Space Marine Legion, the "Blood Angels", to their cause. To succeed, Chaos plans to take advantage of a genetic flaw in Sanguinius' and the Legion's DNA. As the Heresy is getting under way, the outwardly still loyal Warmaster orders the entire 9th Legion and their unsuspecting Primarch to a remote star system. There they find themselves isolated and ambushed, fighting a new kind of war – against Chaos entities and daemons – designed to trigger the Legion's flaw. The plan almost succeeds; yet conflicting agendas among anti-Imperial protagonists, as well as the fortitude and unorthodox tactics of quick-to-adapt Blood Angels, narrowly result in Loyalist victory. In the meantime Horus' rebellion erupts openly and the Loyalists suffer catastrophic losses in the Dropsite Massacre (Book 5). Sanguinius and his Legion, now fully aware of the great betrayal and the reality of Chaos, race to the defense of Terra and the Emperor while buffeted by unprecedented navigational difficulties; it is hinted that these are related to the action in the Ultramar system of Calth (Books 19 and 24).

22. Shadows of Treachery

Shadows of Treachery (Dunn & Kyme 2012a) is a compilation that collects five short stories previously published in limited editions, art books, or other formats, and also contains two new novellas. Most of the stories involve the 7th or 8th Space Marine Legions, respectively the Loyalist "Imperial Fists" and Traitor "Night Lords", and their Primarchs Rogal Dorn and Konrad Curze. Other Legions and Primarchs are also featured, while one short story takes place on Mars and illuminates an aspect of the Traitor Mechanicum's conspiracy. One of the novellas is mainly about an all-out close-quarters space battle, between a Loyalist Retribution Fleet sent to punish Horus following the events of Isstvan III (Book 3) and the Traitor fleet that ambushes it; the other new novella deals with the aftermath of another naval engagement in space that cripples the Night Lords Legion. The narratives of all stories fill gaps in the series or add further details about the Heresy and its actors; they cover periods that range from several decades before the conflict to around the time frame of Book 18 (one short story is a prequel to that novel).

This anthology contains the following stories: The Crimson Fist by John French, The Dark King by Graham McNeill, The Lightning Tower by Dan Abnett, The Kaban Project by Graham McNeill, Raven's Flight by Gav Thorpe, Death of a Silversmith by Graham McNeill and Prince of Crows by Aaron Dembski-Bowden.

23. Angel Exterminatus: Flesh and iron

Angel Exterminatus (McNeill 2012) covers a Traitor operation in uncharted and dangerous galactic space, that may purportedly decide the war in favour of the rebels. The story provides further glimpses of disparate motivations and conflicting objectives among traitor factions as the Heresy campaign continues. It is taking place some time after the Dropsite Massacre (Book 5), shortly following the events described by two novellas (Books 20 and 22). Featured are the 4th Legion of Space Marines, the "Iron Warriors", renowned siege masters of the Great Crusade, and their Primarch Perturabo. However the core plot is set in motion by Fulgrim and the Emperor's Children, who share the spotlight. The embittered Iron Warriors have aligned with Horus out of frustration with the ignominious and unheralded role assigned them by the Imperium; before the story begins, they lash out in unforgivable genocide. In the story, they are invited to the freelance operation (which is unknown to the Warmaster) by Fulgrim and his Legion, who have their own agenda. The operation's true goal is kept secret from Perturabo and his Space Marines, who come to realise that not all fellow rebels can be trusted. A side thread involves Fabius Bile, the chief medical officer of the Emperor's Children, and the Traitors' top geneticist; he is on a no-holds-barred quest to exceed the Emperor's genetic achievements.

24. Betrayer: Blood for the Blood God

Betrayer (Dembski-Bowden 2012) returns the series to the action in the Ultramar theatre; it starts around the time the events of Book 19 begin to unfold. Unlike that story, Betrayer is presented from the perspective of the rebels, in this case the World Eaters and Word Bearers Legions, and often through the particular viewpoint of Khârn, Captain of the 8th Company of the World Eaters and Equerry to Primarch Angron. In tenuous and fragile cooperation, the two very different Traitor Legions lay waste to worlds across Ultramar; it is a "Shadow Crusade" meticulously planned by Primarch Lorgar of the Word Bearers, who deploys Abyss-class spaceships. The campaign's strategic goal is the destruction or isolation of the powerful Ultramarines Legion, its home star system, and the system's considerable resources; removing Ultramar as a factor in the war is one of Horus' primary objectives. The scheming Primarch of the Word Bearers orchestrates genocide in unprecedented scale, as a way to summon the powers of Chaos. With their help, he hopes to generate the so-called Ruinstorm, an immense interdimensional disturbance that will create an impenetrable veil around Ultramar. As the final piece of his plan, Lorgar engineers the "ascension" into daemonhood of the increasingly unstable Angron: the event is to act as the conduit for the unnatural storm.

25. Mark of Calth

Mark of Calth (Goulding 2013) is the fifth compilation to appear in the series; it contains seven short stories and one novella, each by a different author. The stories further describe aspects of the rebels' Ultramar campaign, as close prequels or sequels of Books 19 and 24. "Premium" editions and the e‑audiobook version were released April 2013; text-based general release editions were expected mid-to-late 2013.

This anthology contains the following stories: The Shards of Erebus by Guy Haley, Calth That Was by Graham McNeill, Dark Heart by Anthony Reynolds, The Traveller by David Annandale, A Deeper Darkness by Rob Sanders, The Underworld War by Aaron Dembski-Bowden and Unmarked by Dan Abnett.

26. Vulkan Lives: Unto the Anvil

Vulkan Lives is the first book where the story of Vulkan is shown with a significant background. His memories coming back to him after his capture by his brother Konrad Curze aboard his ship modified by Perturabo himself. He learns more about his immortality, which seems to be a gift and a curse, one he preferred not to bear at all. The book adds more background concerning the battle at Isstvan V, at the same time showing the drama of a squad of his surviving sons and the shattered legions while they fight to retrieve an unknown artifact that will change the course of history in the coming days of the rebellion.

27. The Unremembered Empire: A light in the darkness

Unremembered Empire happens after the events of the Battle of Phall, the Lion's capture of Konrad Curze, the return of Guilliman to Maccragge after the battle for Armatura and the Blood Angels trial at the battle for Signus Prime. An ancient device has been found on Sotha, one which could guide the mighty warships out of the impenetrable veil that cut off Ultramar from the rest of the Imperium. Strange events start to happen after the arrival of members of the Cabal organization; a Word Bearer Legionnaire seeking redemption for his Legion and the Night Lords' Primarch begin their search for an unknown "object" that fell from orbit straight to the hands of Guilliman. Secrecy between him and the Lion might bring undesired conflict between the brothers in this time of treachery, while Sanguinius manages to come back from his trial on Signus Cluster to learn from Guilliman's plan for a new Empire.

28. Scars: A Legion divided

Scars is the first book that centers on the White Scars. The White Scars have not yet received news of the civil war waging across the Imperium. For the past two years, the legion has been cleansing the Chondax System of an Ork infestation. Because of the artificial warp storms created by the Alpha Legion, the Chondax system has been completely cut off from all communication. With the destruction of the device responsible for maintaining the warp storms (as detailed in the short story, The Serpent Beneath, found in Book 20), the White Scars begin to receive a flood of conflicting information. Some reports say that Leman Russ has turned traitor and killed Magnus on Prospero. Other reports indicate that Horus has turned against the Emperor. Perhaps most consequentially, the White Scars receive a distress call from the Space Wolves, who are under attack from the Alpha Legion. Not knowing what to believe, the Khan orders the White Scars to Prospero in a search for answers, leaving the Space Wolves to fend for themselves. Meanwhile, the warrior lodges embedded within the White Scars activate, intending to force the Khan into declaring for Horus. The book centers around the Khan's decision of which side to join: his traitor friend and brother, or his lying, tyrant father.

29. Vengeful Spirit: The Battle of Molech

Sometime after the creation of the Ruinstorm (Book 24), Horus conquers the world of Dwell. There, he learns a secret about the Emperor: long ago, at the start of humanity's great diaspora to the stars, the Emperor travelled to a planet called Molech. There, the Emperor made a bargain with the Chaos Gods for power and knowledge. With this power, the Emperor became a god; with this knowledge, he created the primarchs. After obtaining this power and knowledge from the Gods, however, the Emperor broke the bargains he made with them. Seeking this power for himself, Horus enlists Mortarion (after facing Jaghatai in Book 28) and Fulgrim (after his ascension to daemonhood in Book 23) to help him retrace the Emperor's steps on Molech. Meanwhile, Garviel Loken is charged by Malcador to infiltrate Horus’ flagship, the Vengeful Spirit, to prepare the way for an assassination attempt on Horus by Leman Russ. Loken leads a band of Malcador's Knights Errant to the ship and reconnoiters the interior, marking the passageways in futharc, the Space Wolves' runes, for Russ’ eventual assassination attempt. Ultimately, the Knights Errants are discovered and confronted by the Sons of Horus. Many of the Knights Errants are slain but some escape and survive, including Loken. Molech is eventually conquered with the aid of the treacherous Knight House Devine, which has pledged itself to Slaanesh. While campaigning, Horus learns of a gateway to the Warp that was created and used by the Emperor to meet with the Chaos Gods in their own domain. As Horus searches for the gateway, a perpetual named Alivia Sureka races to seal it shut forever. Ultimately, she fails and Horus breaches the gateway. Although he is gone from the material realm for mere moments, centuries pass for Horus in the immaterium. In those centuries, Horus won a thousand kingdoms in the empyrean, defied the gods, slayed monsters, and denied every prize offered to him. He claimed the power that the Emperor had claimed, but without deception, without bargaining, and without any promise to honour. Returning to the material realm, Horus is now a god of his own making, beholden to no one. Ready at last to face the Emperor, he issues the order to march on Terra itself.

30. The Damnation of Pythos: Thinning the veil

The Damnation of Pythos occurs shortly after the Dropsite Massacre on Isstvan V. Remnants of the Shattered Legions (Iron Hands, Raven Guard, Salamanders) escape Isstvan and stumble upon the Pandorax System. One of the system's worlds, the death world of Pythos, is the source of a warp anomaly of great significance. The Shattered Legions decide to use it to strike back at the Traitor Legions. To do so, they must navigate the treacherous death world itself, the Ruinstorm trapping them in Pandorax, and their responsibility to the colonists and refugees that find their way to Pythos. Ultimately, the powerful daemon Madail manifests. In turn, Madail summons armies of deamons to the material realm. The planet falls to the daemons, who construct daemon starships from the remnants of the Shattered Legions' vessels. Although the Shattered Legions were able to send a one-word message to Terra as a warning before they were wiped out, the message is ignored by the Administratum.

=== Book 31 to Book 40 ===
31. Legacies of Betrayal: Let the galaxy burn

Legacies of Betrayal is an anthology of short stories.

- Brotherhood of the Storm is a precursor to Scars (Book 28). It focuses first on the budding friendship of Shiban and Torghun featured in Scars, as they wrap up the Chondax campaign. It also sheds light on Targutai Yesugei's psychic awakening on Chogoris and how he joined Jagahtai's khaganate. Finally, it records how Ilya Ravallion, the logistician from the Departmento Munitorum, came to join the White Scars.
- The Serpent features a Davinite priest, Thoros, who overthrows a nascent Chaos cult, presumably on Davin itself in preparation for the coming age of darkness.
- Hunter's Moon reveals the fate of the small pack of Space Wolves assigned by Malcador to guard Alpharius—or to slay him if he proved false.
- Veritas Ferrum is a precursor to The Damnation of Pythos (Book 30), in which the Ferrum arrives at Isstvan while the battle is raging and then retreats in the face of certain annihilation.
- Riven centers on the Iron Hand representative to the Crusader Host, Crius, who is tasked by Rogal Dorn with finding the remnants of the Iron Hands and bringing them back to defend Terra. Ultimately, Crius stumbles upon a band of Iron Hands who have employed cybernetic resurrection to bring back dead, near-mindless Iron Hands to fight in machine bodies. Joining them, Crius pledges to return to Terra when summoned.
- Strike and Fade features four Salamander survivors fighting a guerrilla war on Isstvan V in the wake of the Dropsite Massacre.
- Honour to the Dead depicts Titan warfare on Calth in the moments immediately following the Word Bearers’ treachery.
- Butcher's Nails coincides/is a precursor to Betrayer(Book 24). It follows Angron and Lorgar's actions immediately prior to the launching of the Shadow Crusade. Notably, an Eldar assassination force attempts to kill Angron before he can become a Daemon Prince of Khorne.
- Warmaster is a soliloquy given by Horus to the skull of Ferrus Manus.
- Kryptos follows Nykona Sharrowkyn and Sabik Wayland as they conduct a mission on Cavor Sarta to capture a Kryptos, a bio-engineered coding device that will allow the Loyalists to intercept and decrypt Traitor communications.
- Wolf's Claw sees Bjorn One-Handed (soon to be Fell-handed) commandeer Terminator armor from the Legion armory during the fighting in Alaxxes against the Alpha Legion.
- Thief of Revelations sees Ahriman attempting to unravel the mystery behind the flesh-change of the Thousand Sons. Magnus refuses to help Ahriman in his pursuits, instead taking Ahriman on a journey through space and time. Magnus shows Ahriman the final battle of the Thramas Crusade, the Blood Angels' battle against the demons in the Signus Cluster, and the burning of Calth. Magnus says the time will come when the Thousand Sons must choose a side.
- The Divine Word takes place two and a half years after the Raven Guard assault of the Perfect Fortress. Imperial Commander Marcus Valerion is having dreams again, this time of a hydra. His dreams lead him to victory in battle on Eusa. Feeling the emptiness of the war engulfing him, he finds solace in the Lectitio Divinitatus.
- Lucius the Eternal Blade finds Lucius inexplicably alive after being killed on Iydris by Nykona Sharrokyn of the Raven Guard. In search of answers, he travels to the Planet of Sorcerers to face Sanakht, the best swordsman of the Thousand Sons. Just before Lucius lands the killing blow, however, Ahzek Ahriman intervenes.
- The Eightfold Path references the World Eaters turning from the Crimson Path to a darker path. The Daemon Primarch Angron's howls trigger a killing frenzy in Kharne during what should have a been a duel only to first blood.
- Guardian of Order centers on Zahariel as he revisits the Northwilds Arcology with Lord Cypher years after the events of Fallen Angels (Book 11) to determine whether the area is a suitable location for a new fortress. However, something stirs deep within the once-purged tunnels. Fleeing the tunnel, Zahriel must raise the alarm: The Ouroboros is returning.
- Heart of the Conqueror features the sacrifice of Nisha Andrasta, Navigator of the World Eater's flagship, Conqueror. On board, the Daemon Primarch Angron warps the machine spirit of Conqueror and infects the entire ship. While connected to the ship and sailing through the warp, Nisha ends her own life, tearing the Conqueror from the warp in a cascade of screaming, tortured metal.
- Censure follows Aeonid Theil's guerrilla war on Calth and his attempt to escape the dead planet and return to the war at large.
- Lone Wolf previews Bjorn the Fel-handed's climactic duel against his daemon nemesis, Arvax.

32. Deathfire: Into the Ruinstorm

After a seemingly miraculous rescue by the Ultramarines, Artellus Numeon, once captain of the Pyre Guard, urges the Salamanders on Macragge to depart Imperium Secundus and return their primarch's (seemingly deceased) body to the home world of Nocturne — there to attempt his resurrection in the fires of Mount Deathfire. But to do so they must brave the madness of the Ruinstorm, and Numeon has to decide what has to be done to bring Vulkan back from the grave...

33. War Without End: Heresy begets retribution

War Without End is an anthology of short stories.

- The Devine Adoratrice expands on the backstory of the Knight House of Devine on Molech, focussing on how the Knights of the Imperium work, and how they were so easily corrupted by Fulgrim during the Battle of Molech.
- Howl of the Hearthworld focuses on a pack of Space Wolves that are assigned to watch over Rogal Dorn on Terra. But they're not the only ones watching...
- Lord of the Red Sands: Angron has a heart-to-heart with one of his World Eater captains on Isstvan III (a Loyalist one), where his past and his reasons joining Horus is given detail.
- Artefacts: Set before the Dropsite Massacre, Vulkan and his Master of the forge discuss the nature of the Primarchs, how he tried to save Konrad Curze following the destruction of Nostramo, and how with Horus' betrayal now plain to all, he's going to deal with his secret vault of unique weaponry (hint: only seven will survive)
- Hands of the Emperor: The Imperial Fists and the Legio Custodes clash over the responsibilities of securing Terra in preparation to Horus' inevitable attack.
- The Phoenician: through the viewpoint of Iron Hand's First Captain Gabriel Santar's dying moments after his duel with Julius Kaeseron at the Dropsite Massacre, the death of Ferrus Manus and what immediately follows is observed.
- Sermon of Exodus: Across the desert wastelands of Davin, the followers of Chaos prepare to depart the planet. Prequel to The Damnation of Pythos.
- By The Lion's Command: Continuing his hunt for the infamous Typhon of the Death Guard following Perditus, Seneschal Corswain must decide the fate of an independent planet in a war where there can be no innocent bystanders.
- The Harrowing: A textbook Alpha Legion assault is conducted upon Callistra Mundi (which is anything but textbook).
- All That Remains: A group of shell-shocked/warp-shocked soldiers of the Imperial Army are given an offer by a grey-armoured giant that they simply can't refuse...
- Gunsight: Following the events of Nemesis, a surviving Imperial Assassin hunts down the Warmaster within the bowels of the Vengful Spirit. Unfortunately, he's not the only hunter inside the ship, and not all of them are flesh and blood...
- Allegiance: Following his rescue by the White Scars in Scars (Book 28), Revuel Arvida of the Thousand Sons Corvidae must decide his allegiance in the unfolding civil war, amidst the trails of those Khans who were part of the Lodges.
- Daemonology: Following his disastrous mission to persuade Jagathai to join Horus, a weak and scared Mortarion of the Death Guard rampages across the remnants of Magnus' domain. On the library-world of Terathalion, he interrogates an archivist called Lermenta, but the ensuing discussion forces Mortarion to confront his history with father and Malcador, his own suppressed psychic potential, and his position of having to accept his place among the Lost and the Damned.
- Black Oculus: Serving as the connective between Angel Exterminatus and Tallarn, this short story is told through the view point of the navigators of the Iron Blood, and what changes on the physical, mental and metaphysical level they undergo on their journey out of the Eye of Terror.
- Virtues of the Sons: Before the Heresy begins, a concerned Sanguinius organises educational duels for Captains Azkellon and Amit to understand the twin aspects of their nature, so that they will be ready for the coming trials of their Legion.
- The Laurel of Defiance: With the Shadow Crusade scattered and Imperium Secundus on the rise, an Ultramarines Captain reflects on his nature on and off the battlefield, and what might have been had the Heresy not happened.
- A Safe and Shadowed Place: Following the catastrophe of the Thramas Crusade, and with the Night Haunter and First Captain Sevatar missing, Gendor Skraivok plots his next course of action against the Imperium, with his gaze falling upon Sotha as a suitable target.
- Imperfect: Fulgrim with the aid of Fabius tries to find the possibility of Ferrus Manus joining Horus, involving regicide, metal gauntlets, clones, an increasing number of homicidal rages, and a secret sequestered in the depths of the Traitor Apothecary's laboratory...
- Chirurgeon: While conducting a confidential surgery, Fabius of the Emperor's Children reflects on the time before Fulgrim, when the Gene-Blight ravaged the IIIrd Legion, and of a deadly secret that the apothecary has tried very hard to keep buried...
- Twisted: A closer look at the Maloghurst, emissary of the Warmaster Horus as he navigates the changing nature of the XVI Legion where rivalry and personal ambition run rampant, and to contend with a daemonic plot thrown into the bargain, the Twisted is going to have to make alliances with factions more twisted in soul than in body...
- Wolf Mother: Following their escape from Horus' conquest of Molech, the Perpetual Alivia Sureka must ally with Knight-Errant Severian to finish off the malicious Serpent Cult once and for all to save her daughter.

34. Pharos: The dying of the light

With the Ruinstorm unabating, Imperium Secundus stands as a lone beacon of hope for the Eastern Fringe even as Horus's galactic war continues to rage. At the centre of this endeavour, the mysterious Mount Pharos on Sotha holds the key to Secundus' success. But the cruel and slowly-changing Night Lords make ready to launch their long-planned attack on the Pharos itself, and the tormented Konrad Curze makes moves to confront his brother the Emperor Sanguinius. The resulting battles could lead to dark consequences for all life in the galaxy...

35. Eye of Terra: I am the Emperor's vigilance

Eye of Terra is an anthology of short stories.

- The Wolf Of Ash And Fire: At the height of the Great Crusade, Horus Lupercal and the Emperor attack the ork-held planetoid of Gorro. If they win, Ullanor awaits...
- Aurelian: During the first complete gathering of the Traitor Primarchs while the ashes of the Dropsite Massacre are still cooling, Lorgar confronts Horus about the forceful possession of Fulgrim. Lorgar also gets into an argument with Magnus, where the events of Lorgar's Pilgrimage into the Eye of Terror are told.
- The Long Night: Following his capture by the Dark Angels, Jago Sevetarion languishes in the gaol cell in the depths of the Invincible Reason. Suffering from delibitating headaches and talking to ghosts in his cell, the Night Lord has finally had enough of Horus, the Emperor, and his own Primarch, desiring to become an agent of justice once more. But in order to start on that path, he's going to use his 'talent'...
- Massacre: the Dropsite Massacre, as seen through the eyes of Talos and First Claw.
- Brotherhood of the Moon: On trail by his Legion, Torghun Khan must account for the events that lead him to the Lodges and the rebellion that nearly consumed the White Scars Legion.
- Inheritor: Torquill Eliphas of the Word Bearers attacks the Ultramar world of Kronus with the World Eaters at the height of the Shadow Crusade, seeking to harness the power of the warp.
- Vorax: a quick read that details the blockade of Mars following the Schisim, and where a traitor ad-mech is hunted by the Vorax Battle-Automata.
- Ironfire: Following his failed siege at Schadenhold, a broken Idriss Krendl attempts to redeem himself by conducting a prototype strategy against another fortress on Euphorus, but with the Emperor's Children as his targets.
- Red-Marked: Aeonid Thiel leads a squad of rogue Ultramarines in defending the borders of Imperium Secundus, and against internal plots to bring the XIII Legion down from within.
- Master of the First: The disgraced Chapter Master Astelan of the Dark Angels begins to maneuver his way back into a position of power again on Caliban. One way or another, Luther is going to have to carve out more cells...
- Stratagem: Aeonid Thiel and Roboute Guilliman discuss a new treatise of war following the Battle of Calth, the Underworld War and the Shadow Crusade.
- Sins of the Father: During the Tempest of Angels, Sanguinius considers the possible destinies of Azkaellon and Amit.
- Herald of Sanguinius: With Sanguinius crowned Emperor of the Imperium Secundus and the threat of assassination everywhere, Azkaellon has to contend with having to protect his primarch. Even if it means putting one of his own into the line of fire both literally and symbolically.
- The Eagle's Talon: Imperial Fists storm a warship in Tallarn's orbit, resorting to unthinkable tactics to achieve victory.
- Iron Corpses: Amidst the destruction of the Eagle's Talon, Warsmith Koparnos turns to the Titans to survive, all the while feeling overwhelmed by the futility of the campaign and the greater civil war.
- The Final Compliance of Sixty-Three Fourteen: an Imperial Governor of a compliant world must decide whether to follow the primarch which conquered his world years before, or to defy him.

36. The Path of Heaven: Riding Out from the Storm

Following the events of Scars (Book 28), four years have passed and the White Scars are fully committed to fighting the Traitor Legions as they begin their march to Terra. But they have been slowly and surely hemmed in by burgeoning Warp Storms and the might of four legions deep in the galactic north. Caught betweens this opposition and the internal psychological damages his legion is suffering from attrition warfare, Jagathai Khan and his allies turn their efforts to uncovering another path to Terra, one that unearths secrets of the divided Navis Nobilite and the Emperor Himself. But the much-changed Emperor's Children under a resurrected & mutated Eidolon and the growing darkness of the Death Guard under Mortarion are hot on their heels, and to open the Path of Heaven not all will see the Heresy to the end...

37. The Silent War: Chosen of the Sigillite

The Silent War is an anthology of short stories surrounding Malcador's role in the Horus Heresy after the events of Galaxy in Flames

38. Angels of Caliban: Emperors and slaves

Angels of Caliban tells the story of The Lion's hunt to find his brother, Primarch of the Night Lords Konrad Curze, across the 500 worlds of Ultramar whilst juggling the responsibilities of being the Lord Protector of Imperium Secundus. Simultaneously, the ever-deepening divide of Luther from the first legion takes shape in the book, with definitive decisions being made that will permanently shape the future of The Order and life on Caliban, outside of the watchful eye of Terra and The Lion.

39. Praetorian of Dorn: Alpha to omega

Rogal Dorn and the VIIth Legion have been stationed on Terra since the beginning of Horus' betrayal, tasked with securing a fractious Solar System and Terra in preparation for the inevitable assault. Now, the Solar System comes under attack for the first time since the war began by the Alpha Legion, and many of the seemingly impregnable defences wrought by the Imperial Fists prove inadequate. With all eyes fixed firmly upon this new threat beyond the gates of Terra, Dorn must prepare for a fight that will test him to the limit, and force him to confront the prices that will need to be paid and the allies he needs if he is to hold Terra unto the end.

40. Corax: Nevermore

A collection of short stories and novellas that document and detail Corax's bitter guerilla war against the Traitors following the Dropsite Massacre and the Battle of Ravendelve, and his desperate attempts to hold his legion together. But none shall emerge from the Heresy unscathed, and for the Raptors a tragic fate awaits...

=== Book 41 to Book 54 ===
41. The Master of Mankind: War in the webway

While Horus’ rebellion burns across the galaxy, a very different kind of war rages beneath the Imperial Palace. The Emperor of Mankind, alongside the ‘Ten Thousand’ Custodian Guard, the Sisters of Silence and the Mechanicum forces of Fabricator General Kane, fight to control the nexus points of the ancient eldar webway that lie closest to Terra, now infested by daemonic entities after Magnus the Red's intrusion. But with traitor legionaries and corrupted Battle Titans now counted among the forces of Chaos, and a malevolent entity of the Warp circling the field, the noose around the Throneworld is slowly tightening. And for the Emperor, He must confront His enigmatic past and ultimately decide whether to hold onto His failing dream, or accept the Age of Darkness that He had a hand in bringing forth to the Imperium.

42. Garro: Weapon of fate

A connected anthology of short stories that focuses on Garro following the Flight of the Eisenstein (Book 4) during the Silent War. Now a Knight Errant and Agentia Primus of Malcador the Sigillite, Garro is sent on a number of clandestine missions from the desolations of Calth and Isstvan to the halls of the Imperial Palace itself. Incidentally, Garro is also walking a path of his own, one that leads him to both the secrets of Malcador's 'Othrys' project and the growing Lecticio Divinitatus cult, and to question his own place in the Imperium both in the current civil war and what might emerge when it is over.

43. Shattered Legions

44. The Crimson King: A soul divided

Following the razing of Prospero, Magnus the Red now refuges on the aptly unnamed Planet of the Sorcerers, deep within the Eye of Terror. the remnants of the Thousand Sons Legion realise that Magnus was effectively shattered following his fight with Russ – his mind and memories are slipping away into the tumult of the warp. In desperation, Ahzek and Amon (and a very unwilling Lucius) travel to the scenes of Magnus' greatest triumphs and tragedies in hope to restore him once more. But to do so, they must confront hunters of both the Space Wolves and the Knights Errant, along with their own internal strife of the returning flesh change and the decision of whether to join Horus to besiege Terra.

45. Tallarn: War for a dead world

Following their escape from the Eye of Terror (as detailed in Angel Exterminatus and Black Oculus), Perturabo and the Iron Warriors Legion unleash hell on the verdant world of Tallarn, reducing it to a wasteland even as the largest armoured conflict in the Heresy is enacted on its surface. But Perturabo has more in mind than simple punitive destruction – and his growing curiosity into the powers that enacted Fulgrim's ascencion will draw ire from both his adversaries on the stricken planet, and his allies in the Host of the Warmaster...

This book is a collected Anthology of Short Stories and Novellas released over the course of the series:

- Tallarn: Witness Follows the internal musings of the new governor-militant of Tallarn following the campaign, surveying the graveyard left behind and the price paid for victory on the planet.
- Tallarn: Executioner Features the initial bombardment and opening stages of the Battle, through the eyes of a once-mighty armoured regiment stationed planetside.
- Tallarn: Siren Focuses on Loyalist forces enacting a desperate mission to locate the last astropath on the planet following the extraction of the Iron Warriors.
- Tallarn: Ironclad follows Argonis, emissary of the Sons of Horus as he is dispatched to Tallarn alongside a member of the new Dark Mechanicum to bring the wayward Iron Warriors to heel, with the duplicit aid of Alpha Legion operatives and an agent of the Officio Assassinorium.

46. Ruinstorm: Destiny unwritten...

Roboute Guilliman, Lion'El Johnson, and Sanguinius have abandoned the Imperium Secundus and make for Terra, bringing the prisoner Konrad Curze along. Doing so, however, requires them to traverse the Ruinstorm, a raging warp storm which makes passage all but impossible. The three primarchs each face their own temptations and trials throughout the journey through warp, both physical and spiritual. Epic, solar-system sized obstacles situated in both realspace and warpspace prevent their passage, and the three legions must work together to overcome each one. The story's climax centers on Chaos Undivided's attempt to turn Sanguinius to their will. The demon lord Madail presents an unthinkable ultimatum to the Angel. In the throes of his temptation, Sanguinius is burdened with foreknowledge which obscures the righteous path, and the final fate of Konrad Curze.

47. Old Earth: To the Gates of Terra

Old Earth tells the story of the newly resurrected Vulkan, who is compelled to leave his homeworld and his legion behind and return to fulfill his destiny at Terra. To break through the ruinstorm, which is keeping the throneworld inaccessible via the warp, he must make use of ancient Eldar pathways, where humans are not welcome. En route he seeks aid from Shadrak Meduson and the Iron Tenth, who continue to harass the traitorous Sons of Horus with guerrilla tactics. But Shadrak is facing internal resistance to his attempts to revitalise the Iron Hands, while at the same time seeking a showdown with his nemesis Tybalt Marr.

48. The Burden of Loyalty

49. Wolfsbane: The wyrd spear cast

Leman Russ, following the disasters of Prospero and the Allaaxes Nebula, departs Terra (just as Sanguinius arrives following the events of Ruinstorm) in order to punish his traitorous brother Horus. But in order to be ready to confront his much-changed brother, Leman needs to journey into the depths of his homeworld, and come to terms with the burdens of his duty as the Emperors' Executioner, his Spear that never wants to leave his side, and the realities of his nature as a Primarch. Following that, a death-or-glory assault on Horus' vanguard fleet at the gates of the Segmentum Solar awaits, and for the Lord of Winter and War, a faint, fleeting hope that not all of Horus Lupercal is lost to Chaos...

50. Born of Flame: The Hammer and the Anvil

51. Slaves to Darkness: Chaos undivided

With the conquest of the Beta Garmon system, the traitors are at last close upon Terra. However, Horus' injury back in Wolfsbane reopens, leaving the internal divisions of the now-barbaric Sons of Horus to yawn wide. While Mortarion is sent on ahead as the fleet's vanguard, it falls to Lorgar and Perturabo to marshal Fulgrim and Angron, both now elevated to daemonhood and beyond even the will of the Warmaster to command. With Guilliman and the Lion returning with all haste, and with Chaos working against them, Maloghurst has to find the means to hold his fractious Legion together and wrench Horus himself from the edge of oblivion by any means necessary. For the greatest battle the galaxy has ever known looms, and hosts of the Warmaster must unite at Ullanor, for only together can the Siege of Terra truly begin.

52. Heralds of the Siege

53. Titandeath: The God Machines cometh

Set between Wolfsbane and Slaves to Darkness, Titandeath expands on the epic struggles of the Titan Legions in the Beta-Garmon Cluster, the so-called Gate of Terra. With the Ruinstorm fading, With Horus leading the campaign, it's only a matter of time until the system falls, despite the presence of Sanguinius and Jagathai Khan. But the Traitor Titan Legions are becoming corrupted by Chaos, and it soon becomes apparent that even Horus is not immune to its malignant predations. Also expands on the nature of the Titan Legions, the princeps and their beliefs in the Omnissah.

54. Buried Dagger: Doom of the Death Guard

The Buried Dagger is set immediately before the events of the Siege of Terra, and follows the Perspective of the "Death Guard" Legion. The book is divided into three distinct parts, the first is the narration of Mortarion, Primarch of the Death Guard, about his childhood on Barbarus, a planet with a toxic atmosphere and ruled by tyrannical warlords, and his attempt to liberate its people, culminating with meeting the Emperor, who kills the last Warlord, as Mortarion risks finally succumbing to the poisonous atmosphere. The second part, however, is set prior to the Siege of Terra, and follows Mortarion and the Death Guard slowly succumbing to debilitating diseases as their ships malfunction in a journey through the Warp. It is revealed at the end that Typhus, who Mortarion had known since Barbarus, had sabotaged the systems to become favoured of the Plague God Nurgle. This part of the story ends with a mirror of the first, as Mortarion swears loyalty to Nurgle, before he succumbs to the diseases that would otherwise condemn him to undeath. The third part of the story is largely unrelated to the Death Guard, and follows Garviel Loken and Nathaniel Garro, alongside several other characters, as they form the Grey Knights Chapter of Space Marines upon the eve of the Siege of Terra.

=== Book 55 to Book 65: Siege of Terra ===
55. The Solar War

The Siege of Terra commences with the colossal void war between the Traitors and the Loyalists in the Solar System, and to break through Dorn's walls across the planets and moons Horus will have to conduct strategies both standard and soul-churning to reach Terra on time. Amidst the fighting, former remembrancer Mersadie Oliton desperately searches for a way back to Terra, a disgraced Sigismund seeks atonement through battle, Abaddon cleaves out a path laid out for him by both his primarch and darker powers, and Ahriman prepares a ritual that might determine the success of the Traitors. And above all these stories and struggles, in the plane of the Warp, an old man looks at the fading fire of his dream as wolves and worse begin to circle...

56. The Lost and the Damned

With the Solar System now in Horus' clutches, the bombardment of Terra begins. But in order to reach the walls, Horus must contend with the ground defences and bastions outside the Palace, as well as the self-sustaining void-shield of the Aegis. An immense ground war follows, where the front lines quickly devolve into a hellish nightmare and the daemonic abilities of the ascended Mortarion and Angron slowly grind away at the defences. But more than the Walls and the Loyalist Primarchs are needed to be tackled to gain entry, and Abaddon has to contend with the divisions to the Traitor forces while Horus continues his psychic assault upon the Emperor even as his body is being slowly consumed by Chaos. On the other side of the Walls, the Loyalists are confronted by the issues of refugees, embattled defences, the malefic use of the Warp and having to prepare to make hard choices in the ensuing Siege. Thankfully, Guilliman is coming, but is he going to make it in time?

57. The First Wall

With the outer defences now fallen, Horus has two new tasks: claim the Lion's Gate Spaceport from the Imperial Fists, and get the Daemonic Neverborn of Chaos on Terra. The former task he orders Perturabo and the Iron Warriors to complete, the latter to his personal Dark Apostle Zardu Layak. But neither task is going to be easy to complete for either, and both will have to make hard choices to overcome the First Wall. Dorn has a plan to counter the Traitors if that happens. Unfortunately, so does Horus...

58. Saturnine

With battle now joined in earnest, the Traitors under the command of Perturabo begin to look for ways to breach the outer wall of the Imperial Palace. Rogal Dorn on the other hand must begin to make hard choices to keep the palace secure until Roboute arrives, and in opposition to his growing desperation creates an order of scholars to document (and conceal if necessary) the history of the civil war. A multi-dimensional chess game between both side ensues for a weakened section of the wall (designated Saturnine) that will decide whether the palace will continue to hold, or fall with a single stroke. But not all is bound to the Siege, and in the depths of the Palace and far beyond it, secrets and lies are brought to light...

59. Mortis

The Palace holds, but with the Lion's Gate & Eternity Wall Spaceports in his hands, Horus unleashes the Legio Mortis Titans upon Terra. The continued fighting also allows the powers of Chaos to wax, dragging defenders into a quagmire of despair and desperately seek out false paradises that are far worse than death. With the Traitor Titans and the Loyalist Legio Ignatum set on a collision course at Mercury Wall and a sealed order from the Emperor given to Dorn, outside the Palace Paladin Corswain of the Dark Angels must make a desperate ploy that might change the course of the Siege, and the Perpetual Ollanius Persson must journey through the tortured insanity of the warp and his own memories if he and his allies are to reach Terra and his unknown future...

60. Warhawk

As the Palace defenses continue to weaken both physically and metaphysically, Jaghatai Khan makes a dangerous gambit to retake the Lion's Gate spaceport from a mutated Mortarion and the now-fully corrupted Death Guard. Meanwhile, those inside the walls face their own set of challenges – Dorn struggles with the continued burden of strategy, Sigismund finds the path that will herald a new breed of warriors, Keeler finds a new (and much darker) perspective for the hope of the Imperium, and an internally conflicted Valdor goes on the hunt.

61. Echoes of Eternity

The Lion's Gate Spaceport is retaken, but the majority of the Palace and Terra has now fallen to the Traitors. Angron, Daemon Primarch of the World Eaters and now Herald of Horus following Mortarion's defeat, spearheads the carnage though the fire and ash of Terra's dying breaths. In the wake of the Red Angel and the armies of the damned, Chaos is preparing to change Terra into an image more to its liking (and less to the Loyalists' sanity). With the Khan on the edge of death, Dorn beleaguered at the Bhab Bastion, and Guilliman (seemingly) not going to make it in time, it falls to Sanguinius – fated-to-die and the Angel of the Ninth Legion – to rally the defenders and refugees for one more stand at the Delphic Battlement, the very walls of the Sanctum Imperialis, and paint the golden Eternity Gate blood red if he must if it means the Traitors shall not pass.

62. The End and the Death, Volume I

The Warp has caused all time on Terra to stop, and victory is in the Warmaster's grasp. But Guilliman's reinforcements are mere hours away, so Horus orders the shields of his flagship, the Vengeful Spirit, to be lowered in order to lure the Emperor into a direct confrontation. At the same time, Ollanius Persson and his "Argonauts" reach the Palace, hoping to warn the Emperor that Horus' power has grown to the point where he will sacrifice humanity to become a new God of Chaos, "the Dark King". When he arrives, he is met by Vulkan, who tells him he is too late: The Emperor, accompanied by Dorn, Sanguinius, Valdor, and their best warriors, has already teleported aboard the Vengeful Spirit to confront the Warmaster. Garviel Loken, who seeks to confront his father Horus, also manages to make his own way aboard.

63. The End and the Death, Volume II

The Emperor and his companions are separated aboard the Vengeful Spirit, which has become infused with the growing power of the Warp. It soon transpires that the Dark King is not Horus, but the Emperor Himself, who has tapped into the Warp for the power to defeat Horus and his dark patrons. Persson and Loken appeal to the Emperor not to become Chaos in order to defeat it, and the Emperor ultimately relents, releasing the Warp power he had accumulated. Meanwhile, Sanguinius is met by the shade of his fallen brother Ferrus Manus, the Primarch of the Iron Hands, who guides the Angel to his final confrontation with the Warmaster. In a gruelling battle, Horus kills Sanguinius and crucifies his corpse in the Lupercal's Court. The death of their Primarch drives the Blood Angels into insanity, fighting friend and foe alike.

64. The End and the Death, Volume III

The Emperor finally confronts Horus on the bridge of the Vengeful Spirit. Horus mortally wounds the Emperor, but hesitates when Loken attempts to appeal to his humanity. The Chaos Gods, frustrated with Horus' belief that he was in control, withdraw their blessings from him at a critical moment. Realizing he had been a pawn of Chaos all along, Horus begs the Emperor to kill him. Using Persson's Athame blade, the Emperor destroys the Warmaster body and soul. With the death of Horus, the Warp around Terra dissipates, and time resumes. Dorn, Valdor, and their warriors arrive to find the Emperor near death and return him to Terra, while Loken remains with his fallen Primarch just as Abaddon and his warriors arrive. Abaddon and Loken elect to peacefully part ways, but Loken is killed by Erebus, who explains that his death was necessary for the Daemon Samus to be born in the Warp. The Emperor is installed into the mechanism of the Golden Throne, paving the way for the next ten thousand years...

65. Era of Ruin

This book is a collected Anthology of Short Stories and Novellas taking place directly after The End and the Death, Volume III:

- Angels of Another Age
- Fulgurite
- Fragments (All We Have Left)
- Ex Libris
- System Purge
- After the Dawn
- Homebound
- The Carrion Lord of the Imperium

=== Sequel: The Scouring ===
1. Ashes of the Imperium

Following the death of Horus and the placing of the Emperor upon the Golden Throne, the Imperium of Man is shattered and the Traitor Legions flee from Terra. The Primarch sons of the Emperor are left to pick up the pieces and argue what to do next. Roboute Guilliman, Primarch of the XIII Legion, and his allies believe the Imperium should consolidate its resources and rebuild itself. While Rogal Dorn, Primarch of the VII Legion, and his forces want to go on a crusade to destroy the remains of the Traitor forces while they are weakened. Ultimately, both occur. Some Primarchs remain on Terra while other loyal Primarchs go out to reconquer Luna and siege the Dark Mechanicum on Mars.

== Media and editions ==
Series titles are released in multiple versions: in print as paperbacks and hardcovers (with paperback editions printed in mass-market and trade formats); as e-books; and as either abridged or unabridged audiobooks and e‑audiobooks (respectively, in compact disc and audio file formats – the Black Library has partnered with specialist UK company Heavy Entertainment for audio production).

As of April 2013, print editions were generally between 400 and 500 pages, though some mass market versions have rendered in more; total series length in first paperback edition was about 10,600 print pages (24 titles). Digital editions ranged in size from less than a megabyte (some e‑book releases) to over a gigabyte (some e‑audiobook releases); the totals run from a low of about 10 MB (for 22 e-book titles, in EPUB format) to a high of about 11 GB (for 13 unabridged titles, in MP3 format). Durations of audio versions spread from about 6 hours for the abridged editions to anywhere between 11 and 19 hours for the unabridged editions; the total length of the unabridged edition was about 168 hours, divided among 13 titles. CD audiobooks were published in packages of 5 discs per abridged title; two unabridged titles were available on CD, with the longest packaged in 13 discs.

Outside the UK, series titles are published in several countries and languages by Black Library divisions or as co-editions with local associates. As of April 2013, other-language renditions lagged the English-language series in the number of released titles, and had followed distinct publication schedules and release sequences. Also as of April 2013, editions in other languages were published in paperback and e‑book formats.

Starting November 2010, new titles have often been released simultaneously in multiple media; occasionally since then, new titles' digital or audio releases have preceded the print versions, in reverse of previous practice (see table "Published" above). Stories in series compilations have also been published individually, as e‑books, and as MP3 or CD "audio shorts".

Series stories have appeared in whole or in part in other Black Library publications, sometimes before the corresponding series books have become generally available; prepublications have included stand-alone releases of compilation stories. "Prerelease" copies of series volumes have been regularly offered months before official publication, in Games Workshop- and Black Library‑sponsored events such as the various Games Days.

There have been a number of special editions and bundles published in a variety of media; bundles have included the "Horus Heresy Collections", which mix editions and media of the same or different titles. Certain special editions are available in limited distribution months before the release of the corresponding regular, or wider-release, versions.

The books' cover art has been separately released, in poster and other formats. Series bundles and special offers have also contained the separate artwork releases of the included titles.

=== "Premium" editions ===
English-language series releases include publishing of the titles in special "premium" editions: "Premium Hardback" (print) and "Enhanced Ebook" (digital). These versions contain additional material and artwork, and are published several months before their general-availability or regular edition counterparts. The first title to appear in "premium" editions, in October 2012, was Angel Exterminatus (Book 23). The earlier catalogue of the series is also republished in these editions, again beginning October 2012 with the series-opening novel trilogy.

=== Other special editions (selections) ===
- Horus Rising – Dan Abnett. "5th Anniversary Edition" to mark the 5‑year publishing history of the series. With "'titanium blue' foil treatment on the cover" and it includes "an exclusive new introduction by author Dan Abnett" – April 2011
- Limited Edition Horus Heresy Audio Boxset – Dan Abnett, Ben Counter, Graham McNeill. Contains the abridged CD‑audio versions of the series' opening trilogy narrated by Martyn Ellis. Abridged by Christian Dunn. Includes an exclusive bonus CD containing the short story "Little Horus" by Abnett, from the Age of Darkness compilation, also read by Ellis. Total duration is about 18 hours, contained in 16 discs. Edition limited to 2,000 copies worldwide – November 2011
- Xmas 2011 Horus Heresy eBundle – Series authors. E‑book edition of the first 17 Books in the series. One of several series bundles, this was offered as a "Christmas 2011 Special" – November 2011

== Reception ==
Several novels in The Horus Heresy series have appeared in UK and US science fiction charts, have occupied high positions in Nielsen BookScan genre lists, and since early 2010 have often charted in The New York Times Bestseller List for mass-market paperbacks.

Critical reception of individual titles has been mixed, yet the general tone of reviews has been mostly positive. Although the series overall has been viewed favourably, there have been complaints about its length, the multitude of characters and narrative threads, and the timeline jumps or repetitions caused by the nonlinear storytelling. The evolving series is said to have gradually acquired a backstory and terminology of its own; this has led reviewers to question the accessibility of individual stories to new or casual readers.

Sales

Early in its publishing history, the series became a sales success in its category. Horus Rising by Dan Abnett, the opening title, set the pace shortly after its release, topping Locus magazine's "Locus Bestsellers: Gaming-Related" list of August 2006; as of Book 22 (September 2012), practically every title in the series had achieved the same or similar performance on this chart. Horus Rising's January 2011 CD audiobook release also appeared in ranked sales lists: the (abridged) edition was number 15 in a related chart published by The Bookseller, covering 2011 UK sales up to September.

Legion by Abnett, and Battle for the Abyss by Ben Counter, were listed in Nielsen BookScan's list of top‑20 fictional works by small publishers for the year ending 23 August 2008; the books appeared in eighth and sixteenth place respectively. The next published title, Mechanicum by Graham McNeill, entered The Bookseller's "Top 20 Fiction Heatseekers" chart of 5 December 2008, shortly after its release, at number 10; series titles have consistently appeared in this list.

A Thousand Sons by McNeill was released in February 2010 and arrived at number 22 on The New York Times Best Seller List, the first ever novel on the Black Library imprint to do so. Nemesis by James Swallow followed, reaching number 26 on the List in August 2010. The First Heretic, by Aaron Dembski‑Bowden, reached number 28 in the weekly chart in November 2010 and stayed on the List for a second week, at number 33. Abnett's Prospero Burns was next, reaching number 16 in January 2011; this title also topped a science fiction and fantasy book chart published by The Times (London) in March of the same year.

The compilation Age of Darkness, edited by Christian Dunn, also entered The New York Times Best Seller List, in May 2011, at number 31. Book 19, Know No Fear, again by Abnett, continued the trend: it appeared at number 21 in March 2012. It was followed on the List by the next series title, The Primarchs, a compilation edited by Dunn, which occupied position 29 during the week of 17 June 2012; in addition, The Primarchs had placed first in Publishers Weekly's science fiction bestsellers listing for the week of 28 May 2012. In September 2012 Fear to Tread by Swallow entered The New York Times Best Seller List at number 13, at the time the highest entry on that chart for a series novel; the book remained on the List the week after (week of September 23), at number 33.

== Related works ==
Between the late–1980s introduction of the Horus Heresy and the start of this series publication in 2006, Games Workshop and affiliates released Horus Heresy-branded products that expanded the concept's standing as Warhammer 40,000 background material. The release of such works, which include literature independent of this series, continued as of 2013; the works may relate to it as prequels, sequels, or expansions of its stories.

Pre-series Horus Heresy literature and other related works may have been superseded or rendered obsolete, while other similar material may no longer be authoritative even as it remains in Horus Heresy and Warhammer 40,000 canons; still other non-series Horus Heresy material has been eventually incorporated into the work.

A significant development was the 2012 initial release of the Horus Heresy miniatures wargame expansion, which repositioned the concept as a foreground element within the Warhammer 40,000 gaming system – while highlighting the importance of the Horus Heresy to Games Workshop's product lineup and the related universe. The expansion is reputedly developed in coordination with the book series, and includes new material and information about the Horus Heresy and the fictional universe; it joins the series and other works as an authoritative source of Heresy material and Warhammer 40,000 background.

The Black Library and Games Workshop have released novels, game rulebooks, and other products not branded or classified as Horus Heresy, yet directly relating to story arcs or events described in the series. An example is listed in the section below.

=== Selections ===
- Collected Visions: Iconic Images of the Imperium, Betrayal and War – Alan Merrett (writer), John Blanche (conceptual art), Nick Kyme and Matt Ralphs (editors), and many additional contributors. Omnibus edition of the four-volume Horus Heresy art book series (2004–06); it outlines the entire Horus Heresy in art and prose. As of February 2013 it was partially superseded, amended, or expanded by the continuing book series and the newer Horus Heresy rulebook series (see below). As of the same month it remained the most comprehensive official roadmap for the complete Heresy storyline – June 2007
- Battle of the Fang – Chris Wraight. Warhammer 40,000 novel in the Space Marine Battles series. The story takes place a thousand years after the Horus Heresy, and is a continuation of the arc presented in Books 12 (A Thousand Sons), and 15 (Prospero Burns) – June 2011
- Aurelian – Aaron Dembski‑Bowden. Subtitled The Eye stares back, this "Horus Heresy novella" is part of a story arc along with The First Heretic, Book 14 in the series – October 2011
- Betrayal – Alan Bligh (writer), and Forge World artists and designers. "Volume One" in the Horus Heresy rulebook series. This series is part of the stand-alone Horus Heresy expansion for the Warhammer 40,000 game system; the expansion is produced by Games Workshop modelling subsidiary Forge World. Betrayal is centered on the events of Isstvan III, also described in Galaxy in Flames, Book 3 of the book series – September 2012

== See also ==
- List of Warhammer 40,000 novels
