= Gallimard Jeunesse =

French publisher of children's books

- Parent company: Éditions Gallimard
- Country of origin: France
- Headquarters location: Paris
- Publication types: Books
- Fiction genres: Children's literature
- Official website: www.gallimard-jeunesse.fr

Gallimard Jeunesse is a French publisher of children's books. It is a subsidiary of Éditions Gallimard.

It is the publisher of the French versions of Harry Potter by J.K. Rowling, the catalogue of Roald Dahl, The Little Prince by Antoine de Saint-Exupéry, Animorphs by Katherine Applegate, The English Roses and other books by Madonna, Winnie the Pooh, and Pokémon.

Gallimard also publishes The Book of Time trilogy, by Guillaume Prévost (which includes The Book of Time, The Gate of Days and The Circle of Gold), and the birthplace of the encyclopaedic collection "Découvertes Gallimard".

== History ==
In 1972, Birth of Gallimard's youth department, under the impetus of Pierre Marchand (1939-2002) and Jean-Olivier Héron. Launch of the 1000 Soleils collection based on great classics of literature (the first 4 titles are Le Lion by Joseph Kessel, L'enfant et la rivière by Henri Bosco, La guerre des boutons by Louis Pergaud, Le vieil homme et la mer by Ernest Hemingway).

In 1975, Gallimard published its first picture books and beginning of a long collaboration with renowned illustrators: Quentin Blake, Étienne Delessert, Jean Claverie, Roberto Innocenti, Georges Lemoine, Pef (Pierre Elie Ferrier known as Pef) and Tony Ross.

In 1977, Creation of Folio Junior, the first paperback collection of Gallimard Jeunesse for 10-16 year olds, shortly after Jeunesse poche of Éditions de l'Amitié and Renard Poche of L'École des loisirs.

In 1980, Creation of Folio Benjamin and the first illustrated paperbacks in color for 5-7 year olds. Beatrix Potter, the creator of Peter Rabbit, enters the catalog and Pef (Pierre Elie Ferrier) invents a language in La belle lisse poire du prince de Motordu.

In 1983, Folio Cadet is aimed at beginning readers (7-10 years old) with illustrated novels, renowned authors and unpublished texts. First steps in documentary with Découverte Cadet.

== Games and gamebooks ==
In the 1980s, they published most of the gamebooks in France, in the collection Folio Junior — Un livre dont vous êtes le héros (a book in which you are the hero, a reference to the caption of the covers of the Fighting Fantasy gamebooks), including Fighting Fantasy, Sorcery!, Lone Wolf, The World of Lone Wolf, Sagas of the Demonspawn, Grailquest, Cretan Chronicles, Horror Classic Gamebooks, Virtual Reality, Double Game, Clash of the Princes, Golden Dragon Fantasy Gamebooks, Blood Sword, Real Life Gamebooks, Fatemaster, Forbidden Gateway, Sherlock Holmes Solo Mysteries, Super Sherlock, and a few original French series. They still publish some Fighting Fantasy and Lone Wolf gamebooks (reissue started in 2012).

In the 1980s, they also published some games: picture book games (Alfred Leonardi: Ace of Aces, Dragonriders of Pern; Mike Vitale and Joe Angiolillo's Shootout at the Saloon) and roleplaying games: Dragon Warriors, The Dark Eye and Pendragon.

== See also ==
- List of publishers of children's books
