= Tara Duncan =

Tara Duncan may refer to:

- Tara Duncan (media executive), American entertainment industry executive
- Tara Duncan (novel series), a French novel series by Sophie Audouin-Mamikonian
- Tara Duncan (TV series), a French animated television series based on the novels
