= The Way of Wizardry =

The Way of Wizardry is a 1985 role-playing game supplement published by Corgi Books for Dragon Warriors.

== Contents ==
The Way of Wizardry is a supplement in which a simple magic system is introduced. It also provides detailed descriptions of various magical items, including potions, amulets, and enchanted weapons. It contains two complete adventure scenarios.

== Publication history ==
Book Two, The Way of Wizardry was written by Dave Morris and Oliver Johnson and published by Corgi Books in 1985 as a paperback book.

== Reception ==
Robert Dale reviewed the first three books in the series - Dragon Warriors, The Way of Wizardry, and The Elven Crystals - for White Dwarf #74, giving it an overall rating of 9 out of 10, and stated that "The three books are well-presented, eye-catching, and should appeal to the uninitiated. The more experienced gamer should appreciate the care that has been taken to provide a fast, unrestrained, yet balanced and fair game."
