= Kenneth Turan =

American film critic

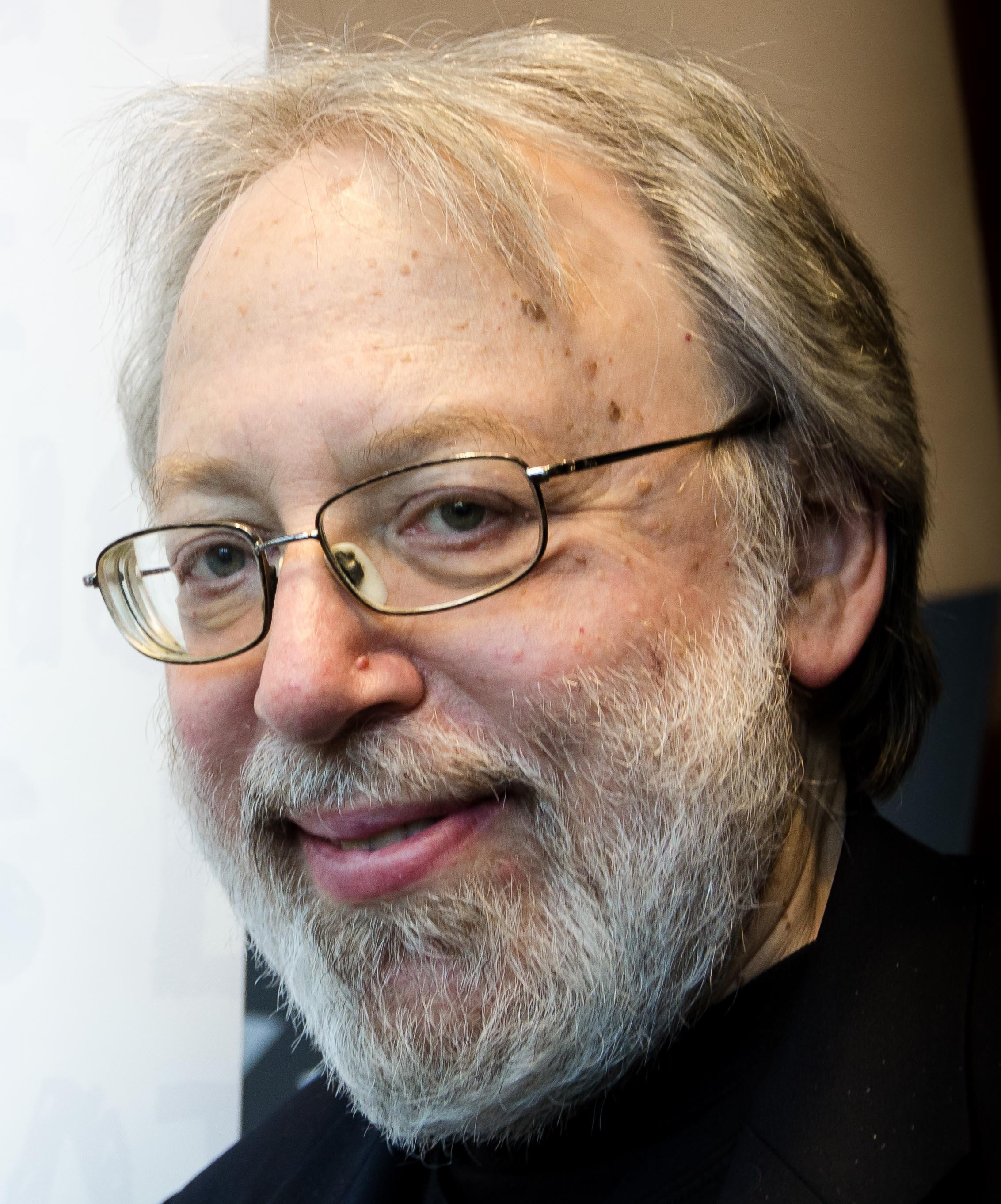
- Turan in 2014
- Born: October 27, 1946 (age 80); Brooklyn, New York, U.S.
- Education: Swarthmore College (BA); Columbia University (MA)
- Occupations: Film critic, author, lecturer

Kenneth Turan (/təˈræn/; born October 27, 1946) is an American retired film critic, author, and lecturer in the Master of Professional Writing Program at the University of Southern California. He was a film critic for the Los Angeles Times from 1991 until 2020 and was described by The Hollywood Reporter as "arguably the most widely read film critic in the town most associated with the making of movies".

== Early life ==
Turan was raised in an observant Jewish family in Brooklyn, New York. He received a bachelor's degree from Swarthmore College and a master's degree in journalism from Columbia University. At Swarthmore, he was roommates with the mathematician and science fiction author Rudy Rucker.

== Career ==
Turan started his professional career around 1970s. Before becoming a film critic, Turan was a staff writer for The Washington Post from 1969 to 1978. In-between, he was a sportswriter in 1971, and by 1976 became a feature writer.

Turan was a film critic for The Progressive, a magazine published in Madison, Wisconsin. He had also written for TV Guide, California magazine and GQ. In 1991 he became a film critic for The Los Angeles Times. In 1993, he was named the director of the Los Angeles Times Book Prizes. Around 2000, Turan joined the NPR to cover the Cannes Film Festival for them. After several years at NPR, he joined NPR's Morning Edition as a film critic. Turan founded the KUSC radio program Arts Alive. He provides regular movie reviews for NPR's Morning Edition and serves on the board of directors of the Yiddish Book Center.

Turan announced his retirement from The Los Angeles Times on March 25, 2020. The last film he reviewed was the German film Balloon (2018).

Turan is featured in the documentary For the Love of Movies: The Story of American Film Criticism (2009) discussing his public quarrel with film director James Cameron, who e-mailed the Los Angeles Times' editors calling for Turan to be fired after he wrote a scathing review of Titanic (1997). Cameron accused Turan of an "incessant rain of personal barbs" and using his "bully pulpit not only to attack my film, but the entire film industry and its audiences".

== Publications ==
- Louis B. Mayer and Irving Thalberg; The Whole Equation (2025)
- Not to Be Missed: Fifty-Four Favorites From a Lifetime of Film (2014)
- Free for All: Joe Papp, the Public, and the Greatest Theater Story Ever Told (2009) with Joseph Papp
- Now In Theaters Everywhere. (2006)
- Never Coming To A Theater Near You. (2004)
- Sundance to Sarajevo: Film Festivals and the World They Made. (2002)
- Call Me Anna: The Autobiography of Patty Duke. (1987)
- I'd Rather Be Wright: Memoirs of an Itinerant Tackle. (1974)
- Sinema: American Pornographic Films and the People Who Make Them. (1974)
- The Future is Now: George Allen, Pro Football's Most Controversial Coach. with William Gildea (1972)

== Awards ==
- 2006: Special Citation; National Society of Film Critics Awards.
- 2013: Luminary Award for Career Achievement; Los Angeles Press Club
- 2014: Media Legacy Awards; Cinequest Film & Creativity Festival.
