= Dragon Warriors (sourcebook) =

1985 tabletop game supplement

Dragon Warriors is a 1985 role-playing game supplement published by Corgi Books for Dragon Warriors.

== Contents ==
Dragon Warriors is a supplement in which rules for creating characters and resolving combat are provided, emphasizing speed and simplicity in gameplay. It includes encounter charts and detailed monster descriptions, along with an adventure scenario titled "The King Under the Mountain."

== Publication history ==
Book One, Dragon Warriors was written by Dave Morris and Oliver Johnson and published by Corgi Books in 1985 as a paperback book.

== Reception ==
Robert Dale reviewed the first three books in the series - Dragon Warriors, The Way of Wizardry, and The Elven Crystals - for White Dwarf #74, giving it an overall rating of 9 out of 10, and stated that "The three books are well-presented, eye-catching, and should appeal to the uninitiated. The more experienced gamer should appreciate the care that has been taken to provide a fast, unrestrained, yet balanced and fair game."

== Reviews ==
- Casus Belli #31 (Feb 1986) p. 22
- Imazine (Issue 16 - Winter 1986)
