= Dragon Warrior (disambiguation) =

Dragon Warrior is the former North American name of Dragon Quest, a video game series and franchise.

Dragon Warrior may also refer to:

- Dragon Warrior (video game), the former North American name of the first game in the Dragon Quest series
- Dragon Warrior (wrestler), ring name of Craig Cohn (born 1983), American professional wrestler
- Po (Kung Fu Panda), or the Dragon Warrior, the protagonist of Kung Fu Panda
- Dragon Warriors, a fantasy role-playing game
