= Virtual reality (disambiguation) =

Virtual reality (VR) is a simulated experience that can be similar to or completely different from the real world.

Virtual Reality may also refer to:

- Virtual Reality (gamebooks), a series of six gamebooks released in 1993 and 1994
- "Virtual Reality" (song), 1997 song by Alexia
- Virtual Reality (Total Escapism), 1992 album by Oliver Lake
