= The Elven Crystals =

The Elven Crystals is a 1985 role-playing game supplement published by Corgi Books for Dragon Warriors.

== Contents ==
The Elven Crystals is a supplement in which the core rules of the game are expanded, introducing additional monsters, spells, and treasures. It also includes three distinct adventure scenarios.

== Publication history ==
Book Three, The Elven Crystals was written by Dave Morris and Oliver Johnson and published by Corgi Books in 1985 as a paperback book.

The Elven Crystals I and II from Goodman Enterprises for the Atari ST were loosely based on these adventures.

== Reception ==
Robert Dale reviewed the first three books in the series - Dragon Warriors, The Way of Wizardry, and The Elven Crystals - for White Dwarf #74, giving it an overall rating of 9 out of 10, and stated that "The three books are well-presented, eye-catching, and should appeal to the uninitiated. The more experienced gamer should appreciate the care that has been taken to provide a fast, unrestrained, yet balanced and fair game."
