= Katherine Pancol =

French journalist and novelist

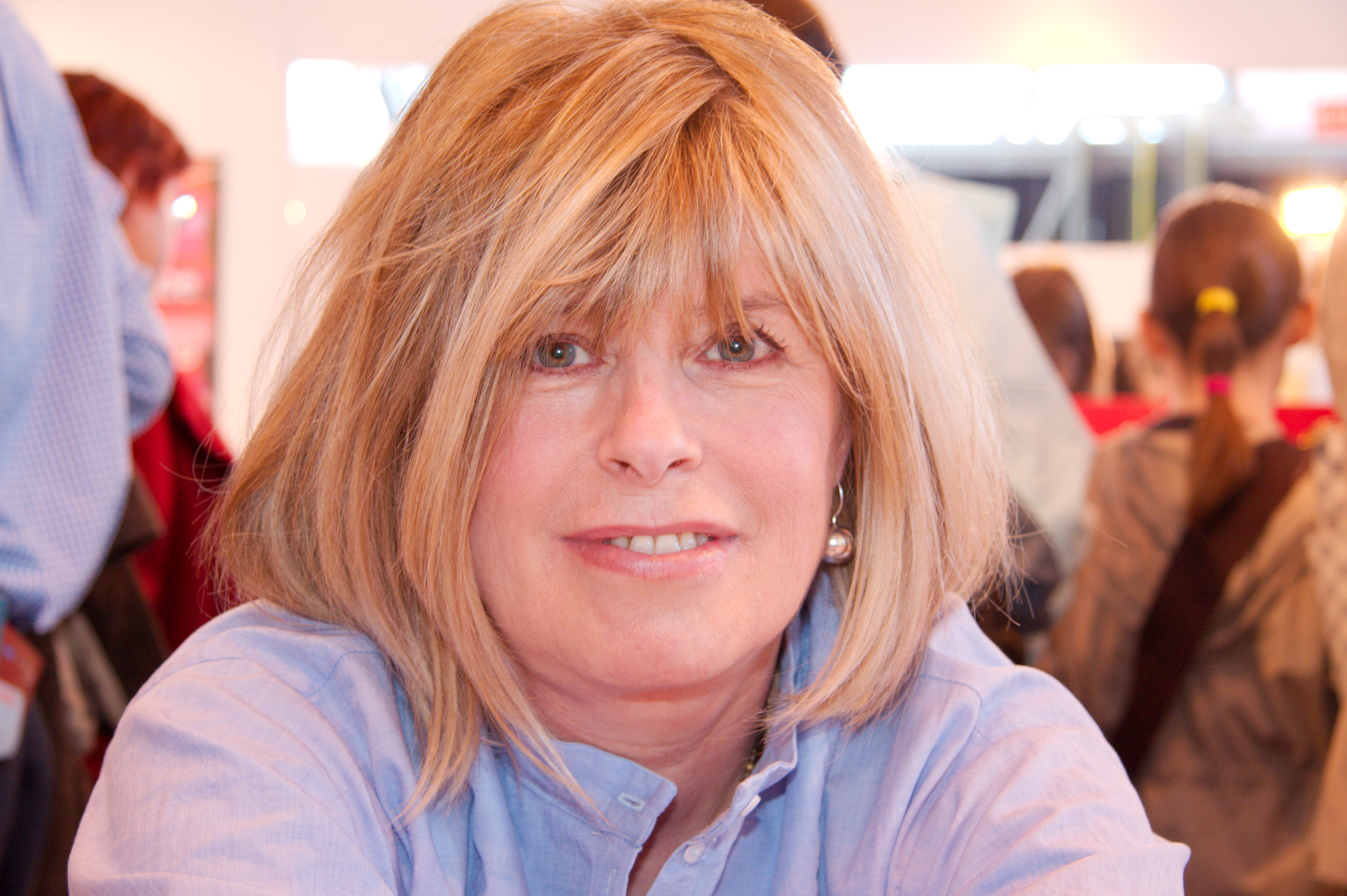
- Katherine Pancol at a book fair in Paris, France, in March 2009
- Born: 22 October 1954 (age 72); Casablanca, Morocco
- Occupations: Journalist, novelist

Katherine Pancol (born 22 October 1954) is a French journalist and novelist. Her books have been translated into some 30 languages, and sold millions of copies worldwide. In the United States, she is known as the author of The Yellow Eyes of Crocodiles (Penguin, 2013) and its sequel, The Slow Waltz of Turtles (Penguin, 2016), both translated by William Rodarmor.

== Life and career ==
Katherine Pancol moved from Casablanca to France when she was five. She studied literature and initially became a French and Latin teacher before turning to journalism. While working for Paris-Match and Cosmopolitan, she was noticed by an intuitive publisher who encouraged her to begin writing fiction. Following the success of her first novel Moi D'abord in 1979, Pancol moved to New York City where she spent the next decade pursuing creative writing and screenwriting classes at Columbia University while producing three more novels La Barbare in 1981, Scarlett, si possible and Les Hommes cruels ne courent pas les rues.

Influenced by the American way of life, her style became more fast-paced and eventful.

Pancol is admired for her insights into human psychology, particularly women, and her sense of detail is often shaded with wry humor. Her works tend to have an uplifting theme while entertaining, and have been immensely successful commercially. One of her goals is to inspire women to dare to be themselves while keeping a positive relationship with life itself.

Published in 2006, her novel Les Yeux jaunes des crocodiles (The Yellow Eyes of Crocodiles) was a huge success in France, where it sold more than one million copies and received the "Prix de Maison de la Presse, 2006" for the largest distribution in France. Pancol was awarded "Best author 2007" by Gorodets Publishing (Moscow). Crocodiles was the 6th best-selling book in France in 2008 (Le Figaro littéraire). It was translated into English by William Rodarmor and "Helen Dickinson" (pseud.) and published by Penguin Books in 2013. It has also been translated into Russian, Chinese, Ukrainian, Polish, Italian, Korean, Vietnamese, Latvian, Czech, Slovak, Hebrew and Norwegian. It was adapted into the 2014 film Les Yeux jaunes des crocodiles starring Julie Depardieu and Emmanuelle Béart. The second book in the trilogy, The Slow Waltz of Turtles, was translated by William Rodarmor and published by Penguin in 2016.

Pancol is divorced from Pierre Pichot de Champfleury with whom she had two adult children, Clément and scenarist Charlotte. She lives in Paris, where she published Muchachas.

== Work ==
Her three-volume saga The Yellow Eyes of Crocodiles, The Slow Waltz of Turtles, and Les Écureuils de Central Park sont tristes le lundi (The Central Park Squirrels are sad on Monday) describes the relationships between the members of a family and in particular between two very different sisters.

In Crocodiles, the main character, Josephine Cortes, struggles with a divorce, economic problems, a difficult teenage daughter, a tyrannical mother, and low self-esteem. She gets entangled in a publishing scheme hatched by her sister Iris, becoming her ghostwriter. As Jo discovers her own talents, she struggles with not getting credit for her work, which becomes a runaway bestseller. Through these challenges, Joséphine grows and finds out who she really is. A review at The Washington Post called the book a "satisfying read."

The many characters surrounding Joséphine evolve into interpersonal dynamics, betrayals and dreams. Even Florine, the 12th century protagonist Joséphine creates for her novel, becomes a character that functions as a secondary narrative thread as her destiny unfolds within a well-developed medieval setting.

== Selected bibliography ==
Published by Albin Michel :

- Bed bug, 2019
- Trois Baisers, 2017
- Muchachas, 2014 (three volumes)
- Les Écureuils de Central Park sont tristes le lundi, 2010 (The Central Park squirrels are sad on Monday)
- La Valse lente des tortues, 2008 (The slow waltz of turtles)
- Les Yeux jaunes des crocodiles, 2006 (The Yellow Eyes of Crocodiles, 2013)
- Embrassez-moi, 2003 (Kiss me)
- Un homme à distance, 2002 (A faraway man)
- Et monter lentement dans un immense amour, 2001 (Rising gently in a great love)
- J'étais là avant, 1999 (I was there first)

Published by Fayard :

- Encore une danse, 1998 (One last dance)

Published by Éditions du Seuil :

- Une si belle image, 1994 (Such a beautiful image)
- Vu de l'extérieur, 1993 (Seen from the outside)
- Les Hommes cruels ne courent pas les rues, 1990 (Cruel men are hard to find)
- Scarlett, si possible (Scarlett, if possible), 1985
- La Barbare, 1991 (The barbarian woman)
- Moi d'abord, 1979 (Me first)

== English translations ==
- Pancol, Katherine (2013). The Yellow Eyes of Crocodiles. Translated by Rodarmor, William. Penguin Books. ISBN 978-1410467676. and "Helen Dickinson" (pseud.)
- Pancol, Katherine (2016). The Slow Waltz of Turtles. Translated by Rodarmor, William. Penguin Books.
