= Out of the Shadows (Dragon Warriors) =

Out of the Shadows is a 1986 tabletop game supplement published by Corgi Books for Dragon Warriors.

== Contents ==
Out of the Shadows is a supplement in which adventure scenarios are also included.

== Publication history ==
Book Four, Out of the Shadows was written by Dave Morris and Oliver Johnson and published by Corgi Books in 1986 as a paperback book.
