= Tara Duncan (novel series) =

Novel series by Sophie Audouin-Mamikonian

Tara Duncan (full name Tara'tylanhnem T'al Barmi Ab Santa Ab Maru T'al Duncan) is the heroine of the eponymous series of bestselling novels in French written by Sophie Audouin-Mamikonian.

Tara Duncan is a young girl who discovers she has strong, unlimited magical powers. She later learns that she is a “spellbinder” who was born on the planet Otherworld, where magic exists, and raised on Earth as an ordinary teenager by her maternal grandmother Isabella. Over time, Tara learns that she is the Imperial Spellbinder, who is considered to be the most powerful spellbinder of all time.

Otherworld contains a variety of beings, including evil wizards, giants, "vampyrs", dwarves, elves, merpeople, and two-headed administrators. Tara begins to learn that in addition to being the Imperial Spellbinder, she is the heiress and future Empress of the Omois Empire, the most powerful and largest monarchy of all the kingdoms, empires, and republics that belonged to her late father. Tara's companions in the series include her fellow Earthling Fabrice and the friends she makes on OtherWorld, including a half-elf called Robin M'angil, thief-in-training Caliban Dal Salan, the shapeshifting princess Gloria Daavil of Lancovit (nicknamed "Sparrow"), and a short-tempered but warmhearted female dwarf named Fafnir.

The series is written by Sophie Audouin-Mamikonian, who has so far written thirteen main Tara Duncan volumes in French. William Rodarmor has translated two of her books into English. The English translation by William Rodarmor of Volume 1, Tara Duncan and the Spellbinders, was published by Sky Pony Press in June 2012. Volume 2, Tara Duncan and the Forbidden Book, was published in January 2013.

A 2D-animated series that premiered in France in 2010 aired in the U.S. on the "Girls Rule" division of the video-on-demand service Kabillion. It was loosely based on the first book, and was cancelled after Episode 26 "The Naughty Little Vampire". Some of the fourteen books have also been translated into Japanese, Korean, Italian and Romanian. A new animated adaptation started airing in 2022. The new series is computer-animated and more faithful to the books.

== Universe ==
Otherworld, (or "AutreMonde" in the original French), is the planet on which the majority of Tara Duncan's adventures occur.

With a surface area of about one and a half times that of Earth's, OtherWorld has a rotation of 14 months around its sun. Days in OtherWorld last 26 hours, there are 10 days a week, and each year has 454 days. Two satellite moons, Madix and Tadix, orbit around OtherWorld and cause significant tides during equinoxes.

The magic that governs OtherWorld also equally influences the fauna, the flora, and the climate. Many different species live there, and because of this, the seasons are difficult to predict. During a "normal" year, there are seven seasons.

Many various peoples live on OtherWorld, with the principal peoples being humans, dwarves, giants, trolls, vampyrs, gnomes, goblins, elves, unicorns, chimeras, tatris, and dragons. They are all able to bond with a Familiar, a random animal, who becomes their soul companion for life. Once bonded, they feel the same things and die at the same time as each other.

The main countries in which the adventures of Tara Duncan take place are the Kingdom of Lancovit and the Empire of Omois, the birth countries of Tara's parents. Her late father was the future emperor of the latter.

== List of novels ==
- Tara Duncan and the Spellbinders (2003): Tara lives a peaceful life in Earth until Magister, the Master of the Bloody Graves, attempts to kidnap her, revealing to her she comes from a magical bloodlone. She is transported to Otherworld, the magical planet her family hails from, and discovers her magic, but being still unable to control it. She embarkes in a quest to free her mother, Selena, who was kidnapped by Magister ten years earlier and is held captive in his Grey Fortress. The plot was slightly modified during the 2007 reedition, where Selena, instead contacts Tara much earlier in the story.
- Tara Duncan and the Forbidden Book (2004): Tara returns to Otherworld to help Cal, who has been sent to prison under accusation of a murder he did not commit. With the help of her friends and her grand-grandfather Manitou, who is now turned into a dog, Tara faces off with the dwarven girl Fafnir and the Soul Devastator in order to free Cal and discover a much more sinister conspiracy.
- The Cursed Scepter (2005): Magister, whom everybody believed to be dead, returns with a formidable army of demons and a scepter able to deprive others from their magic, desiring to seize the Omois Empire and eradicate the dragon race. With her mother wounded and the Empress and Emperor captured, the nowfourteen-year-old Tara finds herself alone at the head of the empire, leading a war everyone believes is lost. She must face the Hunter, Magister's assassin, all while her powers continue to grow.
- The Renegade Dragon (2006): When her magic becomes too strong to be controlled, Tara discovers her power is the result of a genetic manipulation in her bloodline which puts her life in danger. Monstrous enemies attack Earth, forcing Tara to rescue a young Earthling with superhuman powers, leading to a mystery related to Stonehenge.
- The Forbidden Continent (2007): Magister attacks Tara by kidnapping her childhood friend Betty and forcing Tara to go to the Forbidden Continent, ruled by zealous dragons. Now deprived of her powers, Tara travels to the Continent, where she discovers the bloodthirsty Red Queen has taken over and the dragons are willing to let Tara die to conceal a terrible secret.
- In Magister’s Trap (2008): Fifteen-year-old Tara is the most powerful spellbinder ever, and now refuses to continue being a victim of Magister's machinations. When he attempts to kidnap Selena, whom he is madly in love with, Tara decides to strike back.
- The Phantom Invasion (2009): Tara brews a potion to resurrect her father, who died when she was two, but her action has terrible consequences for the balance of Otherworld. The potion goes wrong and opens a portal that allows the ghosts of Otherworld to invade the world of the living. Tara manges to takr refuge in Lancovit's Living Castle, but the events, along with the deaths of Robin and Xandiar, send her into a deep depression. She sets off with her rival Angelica and the mysterious dwarf Sylver to find the island of the Edrakins, where there is a machine who can destroy the ghosts for good.
- The Evil Empress (2010): Banished to Earth for almost destroying Otherworld, Tara becomes a hunter of rogue spellbinders called semchanachs. On her birthday, she discovers the Sangraves have attacked her family and friends. Suspecting Magister is behind the attack, she travels secretly to Otherworld and meets Archangel, the prince of demons, who has hidden plans for her, while her relationship with Robin is tested by her grandmother and Manitou. For his part, Fafnir grows closer to Sylver.
- Against the Black Queen (2011): Empress Lisbeth announces Tara she will abdicate on her, forcing her to adopt the role of acting empress. However, she is transformed into the Black Queen, forcing her to flee from Otherworld for Earth pursued by the Omois Empire. She then meets the Amazons, a group of female warriors tasked with protecting the demonic artifacts Magister plans to steal. She eventually confronts Magister, and the Black Queen resurfaces.
- Dragons versus Demons (2012): As her eighteenth birthday approaches, many suitors propose a political marriage to Tara, among them Archangel. At the same time, a terrible plot is brewing in Tadix, one of Otherworld' two moons, which the demons plan to make explode, killing everyone in the planet. Tara's relationship with Robin becomes even more complicated when Cal confesses his true feelings to her. A new war against the demons approaches.
- War of the Planets (2013): Six demonic planets appear in the skies of Otherworld, bringing memories of the Rift War fought against the demons centuries ago. As Empress Lisbeth and Tara consider to reveal the existence of magic to the Earthlings, Tara and her friends infiltrate the evil planets. Cal and Robin fight for Tara's love, and it gets even more complicated when Cal's former lover Eleanora reappears.
- The Final Battle (2014): A comets threatens to devastate the demonic planets and seize their souls. In the palace of Tingapour, the queen of the elves is mysteriously murdered. To stop the comet, Tara and her friends have no choice but to retrieve the last remaining demonic artifacts they have tirelessly protected for years, embarking on an intergalactic adventure that will lead them to a secret buried for over five thousand years.

The 2010-2011 animated series is also known as Tara Duncan: The Evil Empress, even though it is only loosely based on the novel.

Other two novels were published after the main cycle has concluded, a sequel and a prequel respectively.

- Tara and Cal (2015): Tara, now 22 years old, is now pregnant of Cal's child and cannot use magic. Suddenly, the purple peacocks, symbols of the Omois Empire, disappear, and Cal, tasked with finding them, is distraught when Tara herself vanishes while trying to recover her magic in the Swamps of Desolation. Cal is forced to ally with Magister while Tara faces a new enemy.
- Belle's daughter (2015): Set in Lancovit 450 years before the events of the series, the book stars Isabelle, the daughter of Belle and Beast. The inhabitants of Lancovit mistrust her and her father for their curse, complicating the succession to the throne. However, this same curse proves to be the key to solve a new mystery.

A second cycle, sequel to Tara and Cal, was started in 2016. It was discontinued after its first book.

- The Impossible Mission (2016): Danviou and Celia Duncan are Tara's and Cal's twin children. They are thirteen year old, almost the same age she started her own adventure, but they seem to lack magical powers, which proves a problem when Danviou is kidnapped. Celia gathers new friends, including Magister's son, and searches for her brother, discovering again yet another new enemy.

== Characters ==
=== Allies and Friends ===
Tara's gang is composed of Tara's two closest friends, Sparrow and Cal, who are referred to as "the Alpha Team" in the canceled show.

Tara'tylanhnem "Tara Duncan" T'al Barmi Ab Santa Ab Maru T'al Duncan is the main character of the series. She is a teenage girl with dark blue eyes and blond hair with a white lock, as she is a full member of the Imperial Family and the direct descendant/heir of High Wizard Demiderus T'al Barmi. She is tall and athletic. Her magical powers and abilities are immeasurably powerful because of being genetically tampered with by a renegade dragon. Tara is the Imperial Spellbinder, and she has to fight with a mysterious dark spellbinder while learning to be the Imperial Heiress and Crown Princess of Omois, as she is the heir and niece of Empress Lisbeth'tylahnem and the daughter of Emperor Danviou T'al Barmi Ab Santa Ab Maru, as well as Selena Duncan. However, Tara uses her magic to help people, by doing things that were called impossible before, such as curing vampyrs who drank human blood. Tara is brave, strong-willed and loyal, and would do anything for her friends. Her Familiar is a large white Pegasus named Galant.

Robin M'angil is the son of T'andilus M'angil, head of secret services of Lancovit, and Mevora, a human who is passionate about books and editor of numerous treatises. Being half elven is rare on Otherworld and Robin suffers because of the stigma of miscegenation and is rejected by other elves.

Caliban Dal Salan "Cal" is a Patented thief in training (a spy working for the government). Cheeky, daring, brave, and agile, he has a great sense of humor and sarcasm. He is small and thin, has black messy hair and grey eyes. He was in love with Eleanora, another licensed thief, who believed that Cal has killed her cousin and tried to get revenge. After she dies in volume 6, he becomes obsessed with avenging her at any cost. His Familiar is a red fox named Blondin. He becomes Tara's boyfriend in Book Eleven, and eventual boyfriend in the thirteenth book Tara and Cal and father to fraternal twins in the thirteenth and fourteen books; the later titled The Otherworld Twins and a second son named Daylon.

Princess Gloria Daavil "Sparrow" is the Princess of Lancovit, but she will never be queen, being only the niece of King Bear and Queen Titania. She is nicknamed "Sparrow" because she is shy, but becomes more confident over time. She can change from human to beast at will. She has long curly brown hair. Sensitive and reasonable, she is Tara's best friend and Fabrice's girlfriend. Her Familiar is a white panther named Sheeba.

Fafnir is a red-haired dwarf from Hymlia, and a strong and ferocious warrior. Being the daughter of a chieftain, she is the equivalent of a princess among the dwarves. Like other dwarfs, she hates magic and tries to avoid it. She hates the fact that she has magic powers, something that makes her somewhat an outcast, and tries to get rid of them. She becomes Sylver's girlfriend in Volume 8. Her Familiar is Belzebuth, an almost immortal demon pink kitten encountered in Demon Limbo.

Fabrice is Tara's oldest friend from Earth, son of the Transfer Door's guardian. He has magical powers because her mother was exposed to the emanations of the Transfer Door during her pregnancy. However, his magic is extremely weaker than his friend's, and he's obsessed with the idea of gaining more power, sometimes by flirting with dark magic and forbidden spells. Described as handsome, he is tall, has blond hair and dark eyes. In love with Sparrow, his quest for more powers complicates their relationship. His Familiar was a blue mammoth named Barune.

=== Villains ===
- Magister • is the cruel and cunning master of all Bloodgraves. He is Tara's worst enemy and the one who kidnapped her mother Selena when Tara was two years old. Magister's goal is to free the demons, and he needs Tara's blood to do it. He wants to rule the world, but sometimes he shows positive feelings, such as his love for Selena. He always wears a mask that changes color according to his mood.
- Selenba is a terrible vampyr who drinks human blood. She is particularly cruel and violent with her victims. She is willing to do whatever Magister tells her to do. She has long white hair and red eyes, is thin and tall, and has pale skin. She used to be the fiancée of Safir Dragosh, who is still in love with her.
- The Red Queen is a red female dragon, self-proclaimed the queen of the Forbidden Continent. Bigger than other dragons that Tara has met, she uses humans as her slaves and organizes fight between werewolves, dragons and humans.
- The Black Queen is a black dragon female who is the titular character in the ninth novel Tara Duncan: Against the Black Queen.

=== Supporting characters ===
- Isabella Duncan is Tara's maternal grandmother and the woman who raised her for twelve years. She's ambitious, which sometimes makes her selfish and cruel. She is known as being a top-level spellbinder and is initially bad-tempered.
- Selena Duncan is Tara's powerful and compassionate mother. She has been a prisoner of Magister for ten years but is found and set free by Tara in the first book. She has long curly brown hair and bright green eyes.
- Emperor Danviou T'al Barmi Ab Santa Ab Maru is Tara's father and was the Emperor of Omois before his death. He ran away from his role as the sovereign ruler of Omois and disappeared. He met Selena Duncan and they fell in love and married, having their daughter Tara. He was killed by Magister when Tara was only two, but appears to his preteen daughter as a ghost and later on in the series.
- Jar and Mara are the long-lost younger fraternal twin brother and sister of Tara, and youngest children born to Selena and Emperor Danviou Barmi some time after Tara was just two years old. They were born shortly after Selena's kidnapping, and Magister raised them to believe that he was their father.
- Chemnashaovirodaintrachivu "Master Chem" is a blue and silver dragon who works in Lancovit and helps Tara's gang. He often takes the form of an old wise man.
- Empress Lisbeth'Tylanhem T'al Barmi Ab Santa Ab Maru is the Empress of Omois. She is Tara's paternal aunt and Danviou's older sister. Like Tara, she has enormously long blond hair with a white lock and dark blue eyes. Her beauty is legendary and devastating. Her near unlimited magical powers make a dangerous and respected ruler as well as a topmost and insanely powerful spellbinder of Omois.
- Emperor Sandor T'al Barmi Ab March Ab Brevis is Lisbeth's half-brother and Emperor of Omois. He replaced his half brother Danviou when he died. He also has long blond hair, often tied in a low ponytail. He is a good warrior, leader of the Omois Army, and teaches his niece Tara how to fight hand-to-hand combat.
- Sylver, debuting in Tara Duncan and the Phantom Invasion, is a handsome and mysterious boy with long blond hair and a scaly skin. Raised by the dwarfs, he's a fierce and formidable warrior. Kind, shy and a bit clumsy, he's willing to help Tara in her quest, at the risk of his life. When he's asleep, Sylver changes into a dangerous and strong creature who wants to kill and destroy everything. It ultimately is revealed that he is the son of Magister and a very powerful dragon called Ama, who was the daughter of the last Dragon King; making him a dragon/spellbinder hybrid.
