= William Rodarmor =

American translator of French literature (born 1942)

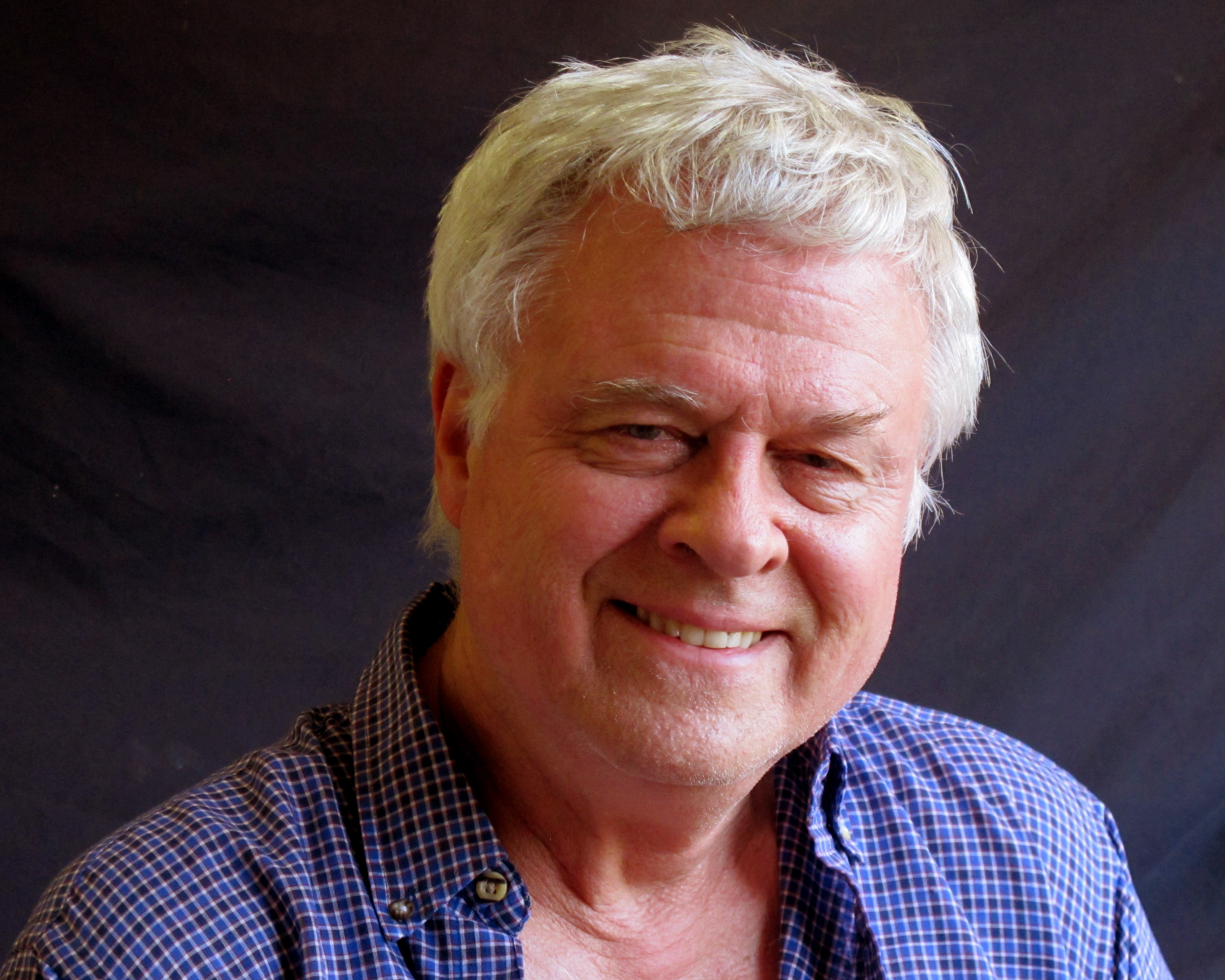
- Journalist and translator William Rodarmor – profile picture taken in March 2012
- Born: June 5, 1942 (age 84); New York
- Education: Dartmouth College (BA); Columbia University (JD); UC Berkeley (MJ)
- Occupations: French literary translator, Journalist
- Writing career
- Years active: 1970–present
- Notable works: Tamata and the Alliance (translator); And Their Children After Them (translator)
- Notable awards: Lewis Galantière Award (1996); Albertine Prize (2021)

William Rodarmor (born June 5, 1942) is an American journalist, adventurer, and translator of French literature. He is notable in the field of literary translation for having won the Lewis Galantière Award from the American Translators Association, and the Albertine Prize.

Rodarmor was born in New York City and pursued a bilingual education in English and French. He briefly practiced law in San Francisco but quickly abandoned it to sail to Tahiti. He then spent the 1970s traveling, mountaineering, and sailing. He took odd jobs and wrote freelance. Sailing in the South Pacific, he met singlehanded sailor and author Bernard Moitessier in Tahiti. This led to Rodarmor's first book translation: Moitessier's round-the-world saga, The Long Way. He would go on to translate over forty more books, including Moitessier's popular Tamata and the Alliance, and a number of books by Gérard de Villiers, Tanguy Viel, and Katherine Pancol.

Rodarmor concurrently pursued a career in journalism, including working as an associate editor for PC World in the late 1980s, and as the managing editor of California Monthly (UC Berkeley's alumni magazine) during the 1990s. In the 2000s he turned again to freelance writing.

== Biography ==
=== Early life and education ===
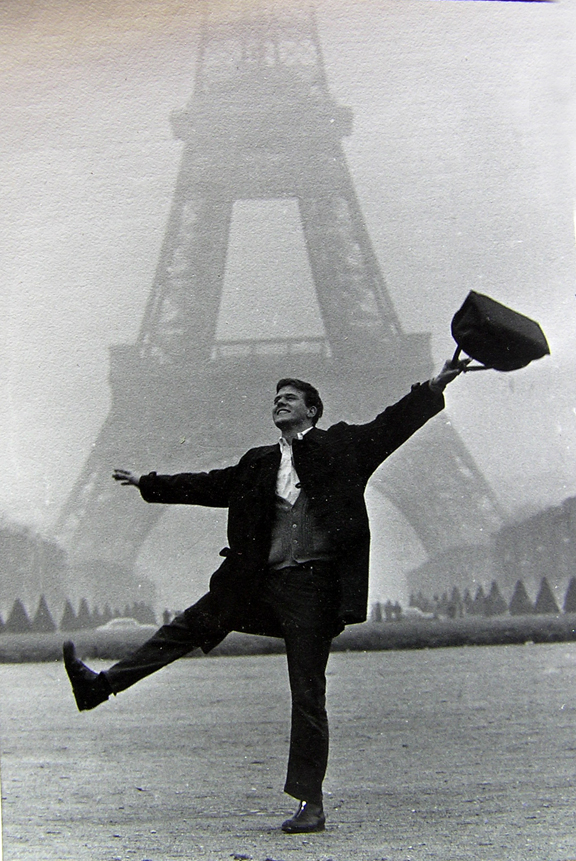
William Rodarmor on leave from the U.S. Army in Germany in 1963, leaping in front of the Eiffel Tower. Rodarmor staged this self-portrait in an homage to photographer Art Buchwald.

William Rodarmor was born in New York City on June 5, 1942, and attended the Lycée Français de New York, as well as Collège Beau Soleil in Switzerland, becoming bilingual at an early age. He enrolled at Dartmouth College in 1960, but dropped out to serve in the Army from 1961 to 1964. While in the service he learned Russian in California, and served as an Army Russian linguist in Germany. He returned to Dartmouth to earn his B.A. in 1966. After earning a J.D. degree from Columbia Law School in 1969, he moved to San Francisco and spent one year practicing personal injury law. In 1984 he earned a master's degree in journalism from the University of California, Berkeley.

=== Early career and wilderness adventures ===
Rodarmor quit the law in 1970, when he was 28, and sailed from Panama to Tahiti, as a crew member on a 40-foot French ketch. This would be the first of many adventures he embarked on during the next decade; spending the 1970s rafting rivers and climbing mountains.

While in Tahiti he met Bernard Moitessier, a French singlehanded sailor and popular author. Moitessier asked Rodarmor to translate his round-the-world saga, The Long Way, into English. This would be the first of over forty French-to-English book translations that Rodarmor would undertake during his decades-long career in literary translation.

Inspired by Moitessier, in 1971 he sailed 30 days solo from Tahiti to Hawaii.

Rodarmor worked as a National Park Service ranger in Alaska in 1973–1975, led wilderness trips for Mountain Travel, he also worked for the U.S. State Department as a French interpreter, and in 1974 he joined a mountaineering expedition to Chile.

=== Journalistic and editorial career ===
Throughout the 1970s, Rodarmor was a freelance writer, writing on topics ranging from sailing and climbing to acupuncture and plastic surgery.

He also worked as an editor for East Bay Review in the late 1970s.

In 1982 he went back to school, to pursue a master's degree in journalism at University of California, Berkeley, graduating in 1984. He said he especially enjoyed learning broadcasting from Bill Drummond and long-form writing from Bernard Taper and David Littlejohn.

In 1983 Rodarmor published one of his more notable articles, an investigative piece that brought to light allegations of sexual abuse by guru Muktananda, titled “The Secret Life of Swami Muktananda" in CoEvolution Quarterly.

He was an associate editor for PC World magazine from 1986 to 1989, then the managing editor of California Monthly (U.C. Berkeley's alumni magazine) until 1999.

During this time he wrote on a broad array of subjects, ranging from computers to medicine, but with a frequent focus on law. During his tenure at California Monthly, he received the Council for Advancement and Support of Education's 1993 gold medal for Best Article of the Year in higher education reporting for "TKO in Sociology," the story of French sociology professor Loïc Wacquant who spent four years studying boxers in the Chicago ghetto.

After a decade at California Monthly, Rodarmor accepted a position as the top editor of a web-based business publication, Links to Solutions. He found the new position to be challenging but exciting, starting with a pool of "underpaid" freelance writers of varying skills. He weeded out the less-than-desirable reporters, and fought to raise the pay rate for the better ones. "Good writers are an editor's stock in trade," he says. "You have to treasure them and treat them right." In 2001, as part of the dot-com crash the publication went bankrupt, propelling him back into the world of freelance writing and editing.

=== Personal life ===
Rodarmor grew up in New York, and has long lived in Berkeley, California. He was married to novelist Thaisa Frank with whom he had a son, Casey Rodarmor (b. 1983), a UC Berkeley graduate in computer science known for his blockchain expertise. Rodarmor and Frank divorced in 2002.

While studying law at Columbia in the late 1960s he forged a life-long friendship with his classmate Toby Golick (who later became a law professor). Later in life they renewed their romantic relationship. Together, Golick and Rodarmor won The New Yorker cartoon caption contest in 2010.

== Translation work ==
Since 1970 Rodarmor has translated over 40 books and screenplays from French to English.

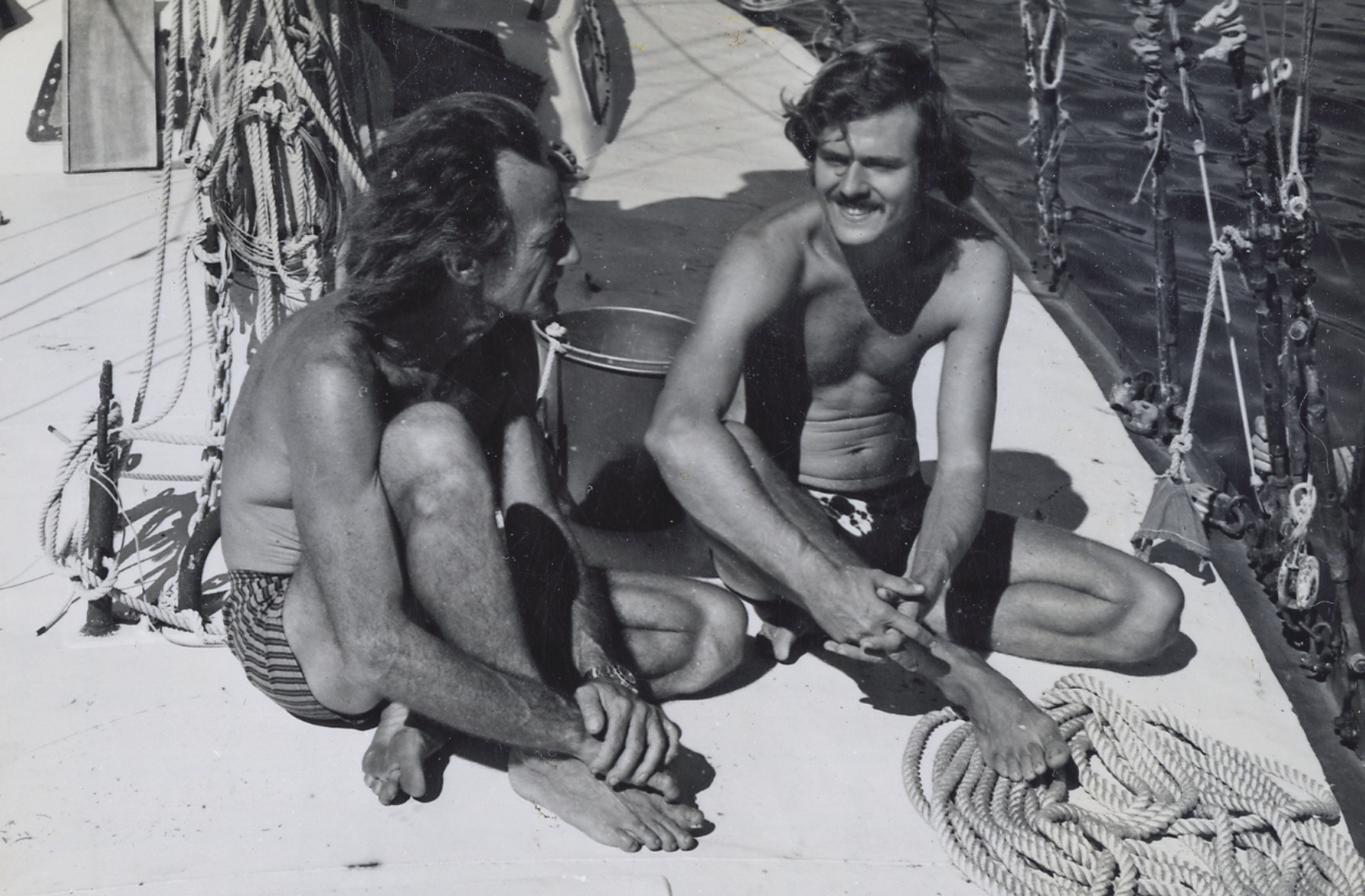
William Rodarmor (right) with notable French sailor and author Bernard Moitessier in Tahiti in 1971. Soon after arriving in Tahiti, Rodarmor met famed solo sailor Bernard Moitessier, who had recently completed an extraordinary solo non-stop sail around the world. They became friends and Rodarmor translated Moitessier’s book about his trip, The Long Way.

Among his numerous authors, Rodarmor has translated several more than once. He started with Bernard Moitessier’s round-the-world saga The Long Way in 1973, and continued the stories of sailing adventures with Tamata and the Alliance in 1995 and A Sea Vagabond’s World in 1998. Between 2014 and 2016, Rodarmor reeled off five spy thrillers by Gérard de Villiers, whose CIA contractor hero Malko Linge has been compared to that of Ian Fleming's James Bond. Rodarmor has also translated a series of time-travel books by Guillaume Prévost and novels by Katherine Pancol.

=== Reviews and style ===
Reviewers have called Rodarmor's translations "elegant" and "smooth."

The Wall Street Journal in its review of de Villiers' The Madmen of Benghazi said that Rodarmor's English translation "is actually better than the original."

Nancy Cirillo, in reviewing the translation of Stéphane Dufoix's Diasporas, said that "Rodarmor's translation is seamless, rendered with that appearance of effortlessness that only the most gifted and painstaking translators can accomplish."

William Scherman, writing about Moitessier's Tamata and the Alliance, called it a "runaway bestseller (...) available in English through the brilliant translation of journalist William Rodarmor."

A. Bowdoin Van Riper in reviewing The Fate of the Mammoth by Claudine Cohen said of the translation that it "reads smoothly and introduces only occasional infelicities."

Multiple reviewers praised Rodarmor's translation of Nicolas Mathieu's bestseller And Their Children After Them, especially for his ability to translate the slang-rich book into American vernacular. Joshua Armstrong writing for the Los Angeles Review of Books said that "veteran translator William Rodarmor does a good job capturing this tone, deftly transposing the slangy French dialogue into its 1990s English equivalent." Similarly, Boyd Tonkin writing for the Financial Times notes that "Rodarmor’s salty and supple translation lends to Anthony and his pals the smartass, vulnerable voices of American, not British, rust-belt teens." O'Keeffe writing for The Times Literary Supplement said "Mathieu’s handling of quotidian and often gritty subjects is disconcertingly lyrical, and it is rendered well by William Rodarmor’s translation." On the other hand, Thomas Chatterton Williams writing for The New York Times deemed that the narrative had been "somewhat ineptly translated."

=== Translation philosophy ===
Rodarmor has said that literary translation "has all the pleasures of creative writing, and you never have writer’s block."

His loyalty as a translator is to both the author and the reader, "but in a pinch, I try to help the reader," prioritizing their experience over producing a word-for-word translation. Along these lines, he favors the "stealth gloss," the practice of discreetly inserting a word or two to clarify an otherwise obscure passage. Similarly, he may expand obscure abbreviations. Once in a while he will even make factual corrections (i.e. dates of historical events) with the author's assent. But he abstains when translating primary sources, in order to preserve their integrity. This was the case when he made the first English translation of the 1933 memoir of Parisian art dealer Berthe Weill.

He says that his goal is "to produce a text so smooth that the reader isn’t aware it’s a translation" and that it should read like a book the original author would have written if he were fluent in English. In consequence he takes some liberties, especially with jokes, slang, and idioms when the author agrees. "Like most translators, I’m a ventriloquist," he says, "and I work hard to make people sound like themselves, and not like me."

=== Awards ===
Rodarmor has won several translation awards, most notably the Lewis Galantière Award and the Albertine Prize.

In 1996 Rodarmor won the Lewis Galantière Award from the American Translators Association for his translation of Tamata and the Alliance by Bernard Moitessier. The award is given biennially for a distinguished book-length literary translation from any language.

In 2001 he received an honorary mention from the Mildred L. Batchelder Award, bestowed by the American Library Association for his translation of Ultimate Game, by Christian Lehmann.

In 2017 he received the Northern California Book Award for Fiction Translation for his translation of The Slow Waltz of Turtles by Katherine Pancol.

In 2021 he won the Albertine Prize for his translation of And Their Children After Them by Nicolas Mathieu. In 2023 he received the Albertine Jeunesse prize for his translation of The Last Giants by François Place. The Albertine Prize, co-presented by Van Cleef & Arpels and the French Embassy, recognizes American readers’ favorite French-language fiction title recently translated into English.

In 2024 Rodarmor's translation of A Man with No Title by Xavier Le Clerc won the PEN Translates award, a grant program by English PEN to encourage U.K. publishers to acquire more books from other languages.

== Selected works ==
=== Translation works ===
==== Fiction ====
- Gomez-Arcos, Agustin (1984). The Carnivorous Lamb. Godine/Arsenal Pulp Press. ISBN 978-1551522302.
- Belloc, Denis (1991). Neons. Godine/Quartet. ISBN 978-0879238582.
- Belloc, Denis (1992). Slow Death in Paris. Quartet. ISBN 978-0704327870.
- Collard, Cyril (1993). Savage Nights. Quartet Books/Overlook Press. (made into a 1992 film)
- Failler, Jean (2003). Mayhem in Saint-Malo. Editions du Palémon.
- Zeller, Florian (2007). Julien Parme. Other Press. ISBN 978-1590512807.
- Pancol, Katherine (2013). The Yellow Eyes of Crocodiles. Penguin Books. ISBN 978-1410467676.
- Lattès, Jean-Claude (2014). The Last King of the Jews. Open Road.
- Spy series featuring Malko Linge:
  - de Villiers, Gérard (2014). The Madmen of Benghazi. Vintage Books. ISBN 978-0804169318.
  - de Villiers, Gérard (2014). Chaos in Kabul. Vintage Books. ISBN 978-0804169332.
  - de Villiers, Gérard (2015). Revenge of the Kremlin. Vintage Books. ISBN 978-0804169356.
  - de Villiers, Gérard (2016). Lord of the Swallows. Vintage Books. ISBN 978-0804169370.
  - de Villiers, Gérard (2016). Surface to Air. Vintage Books. ISBN 978-0804169394.
- Pancol, Katherine (2016). The Slow Waltz of Turtles. Penguin Books. ISBN 9780143128175.
- Viel, Tanguy (2019). Article 353. Other Press. ISBN 978-1590519332.
- Mathieu, Nicolas (2020). And Their Children After Them. Other Press. ISBN 978-1892746771.
- Salmon, Christian (2022). The Blumkin Project: A Biographical Novel. Other Press. ISBN 978-1590511541.
- Viel, Tanguy (2024). The Girl You Call. Other Press. ISBN 978-1635423259.

==== Nonfiction and biographies ====
- Bagnis, Raymond (1973). Fishes of Polynesia. Edipac-Hachette. ISBN 978-0701804091.
- Moitessier, Bernard (1975). The Long Way. Doubleday. ISBN 0-385-03867-4.
- Moitessier, Bernard (1995). Tamata and the Alliance. Sheridan House. ISBN 978-0924486777.
- Moitessier, Bernard (1998). A Sea Vagabond's World. Sheridan House. ISBN 978-1574090215.
- Cohen, Claudine (2002). The Fate of the Mammoth. University of Chicago Press. ISBN 978-0226112923.
- Bengal; et al. (2004). Illustrations with Photoshop. O'Reilly Media. ISBN 978-0596008598.
- Collandre, Patrick; et al. (2005). Creating Photomontages with Photoshop. O'Reilly Media. ISBN 978-0596008581.
- Bodin, Bertrand; et al. (2005). Assembling Panoramic Photos. O'Reilly Media. ISBN 978-0596009755.
- Dufoix, Stéphane (2008). Diasporas. University of California Press. ISBN 978-0520253599.
- Cypel, Sylvain (2021). The State of Israel vs. the Jews. Other Press. ISBN 978-1635420975.
- Weill, Berthe (2022). Pow! Right in the Eye! Thirty Years Behind the Scenes of Modern French Painting. University of Chicago Press. ISBN 978-0226814360.
- Le Clerc, Xavier (2024). A Man with No Title. Saqi Books. ISBN 978-0863569821.

==== Young adult ====
- Place, François (1993). The Last Giants. Godine. ISBN 978-0879239909.
- Lehmann, Christian (2000). Ultimate Game. Godine. ISBN 978-1567921076.
- Modiano, Patrick; Sempé, Jean-Jacques (2001). Catherine Certitude. Godine. ISBN 978-2070630066.
- Place, François (2003). The Old Man Mad About Drawing: A Tale of Hokusai. Godine. ISBN 978-1567922608.
- Book of Time trilogy:
  - Prévost, Guillaume (2007). The Book of Time. Scholastic. ISBN 978-0-439-88375-7.
  - Prévost, Guillaume (2008). The Gate of Days. Scholastic. ISBN 978-0-439-88376-4.
  - Prévost, Guillaume (2009). The Circle of Gold. Scholastic. ISBN 978-0439883771.
- Audouin-Mamikonian, Sophie (2012). Tara Duncan and the Spellbinders. Sky Pony Press (Skyhorse Publishing). ISBN 978-1616089696.
- Audouin-Mamikonian, Sophie (2013). Tara Duncan and the Forbidden Book. Sky Pony Press (Skyhorse Publishing). ISBN 978-1616089696.
- Audouin-Mamikonian, Sophie (2013). Indiana Teller: Spring Moon. Entangled (Macmillan Publishers). ISBN 978-1-62266-129-9.
- Charrier, Lisa; Domergue, Agnes (2014). Oh My, Oh No!. Running Press Kids. ISBN 978-0762454099.

=== Journalistic works ===
- Rodarmor, W. (Winter 1983). "The Secret Life of Swami Muktananda" (PDF). CoEvolution Quarterly: 104–11.
- Rodarmor, W. (September 15, 1985). "A Brave New You". California Living Magazine, San Francisco Examiner: 18–23.
- Rodarmor, W. (December 1991). "Havoc in the Hills". California Monthly. University of California, Berkeley: 10–13.
- Rodarmor, W. (September 1992). "TKO in Sociology". California Monthly. University of California, Berkeley.
- Rodarmor, W. (December 2001). "Prosecution Complex". California Lawyer. Daily Journal Corporation: 21–27.
- Rodarmor, W. (December 1995). "A Delicate Balance". California Monthly. University of California, Berkeley: 10–14.
- Rodarmor, W. (Winter 2003–2004). "Committed to Justice". Boalt Hall Transcript. University of California, Berkeley: 20–27.

=== Edited works ===
- Rodarmor, W.; Milner, Tom, eds. (1985). People Behind the News: Media Alliance's 1985 Guide to Accessible Bay Area Journalists. Media Alliance. OCLC 12174808.
- Rodarmor, W.; Livia, Anna, eds. (2008). France: A Traveler's Literary Companion. United States: Whereabouts Press. ISBN 9781883513184.
- Rodarmor, W., ed. (2011). French Feast: A Traveler's Literary Companion. United States: Whereabouts Press. ISBN 9780982785218.
