= Les Yeux jaunes des crocodiles =

- Theatrical release poster
- Directed by: Cécile Telerman
- Screenplay by: Charlotte de Champfleury; Cécile Telerman
- Based on: Les Yeux jaunes des crocodiles by Katherine Pancol
- Produced by: Manuel Munz
- Starring: Julie Depardieu; Emmanuelle Béart; Alice Isaaz; Jacques Weber
- Cinematography: Pascal Ridao
- Edited by: Marie Castro
- Music by: Frédéric Aliotti
- Production companies: Les Films Manuel Munz; Wild Bunch; TF1 Films Production; Vertigo Films
- Distributed by: Wild Bunch
- Release date: 9 April 2014
- Running time: 118 minutes
- Country: France
- Language: French
- Budget: €10.5 million
- Box office: $6.1 million

Les Yeux jaunes des crocodiles (English: The Yellow Eyes of Crocodiles) is a 2014 French drama film directed by Cécile Telerman and based on the best-selling novel Les Yeux jaunes des crocodiles by Katherine Pancol. The film stars Julie Depardieu, Emmanuelle Béart, Alice Isaaz and Jacques Weber.

== Cast ==
- Julie Depardieu as Joséphine Cortes
- Emmanuelle Béart as Iris Dupin
- Patrick Bruel as Philippe Dupin
- Alice Isaaz as Hortense Cortes
- Jacques Weber as Marcel Grobz
- Karole Rocher as Josiane Lambert
- Édith Scob as Henriette Grobz
- Samuel Le Bihan as Antoine Cortes
- Quim Gutiérrez as Luca Giampaoli
- Jana Bittnerova as Irina
- Nancy Tate as Shirley
- Alysson Paradis as Mylène
- Nathalie Besançon as Bérangère
- Bruno Debrandt as Bruno Chaval
- Ariel Wizman as Gaston Serrurier

== Accolades ==
Award / Film Festival	Category	Recipients and nominees	Result
Cabourg Film Festival	Female Revelation	Alice Isaaz	Won
