= Sophie Audouin-Mamikonian =

Armenian-French writer

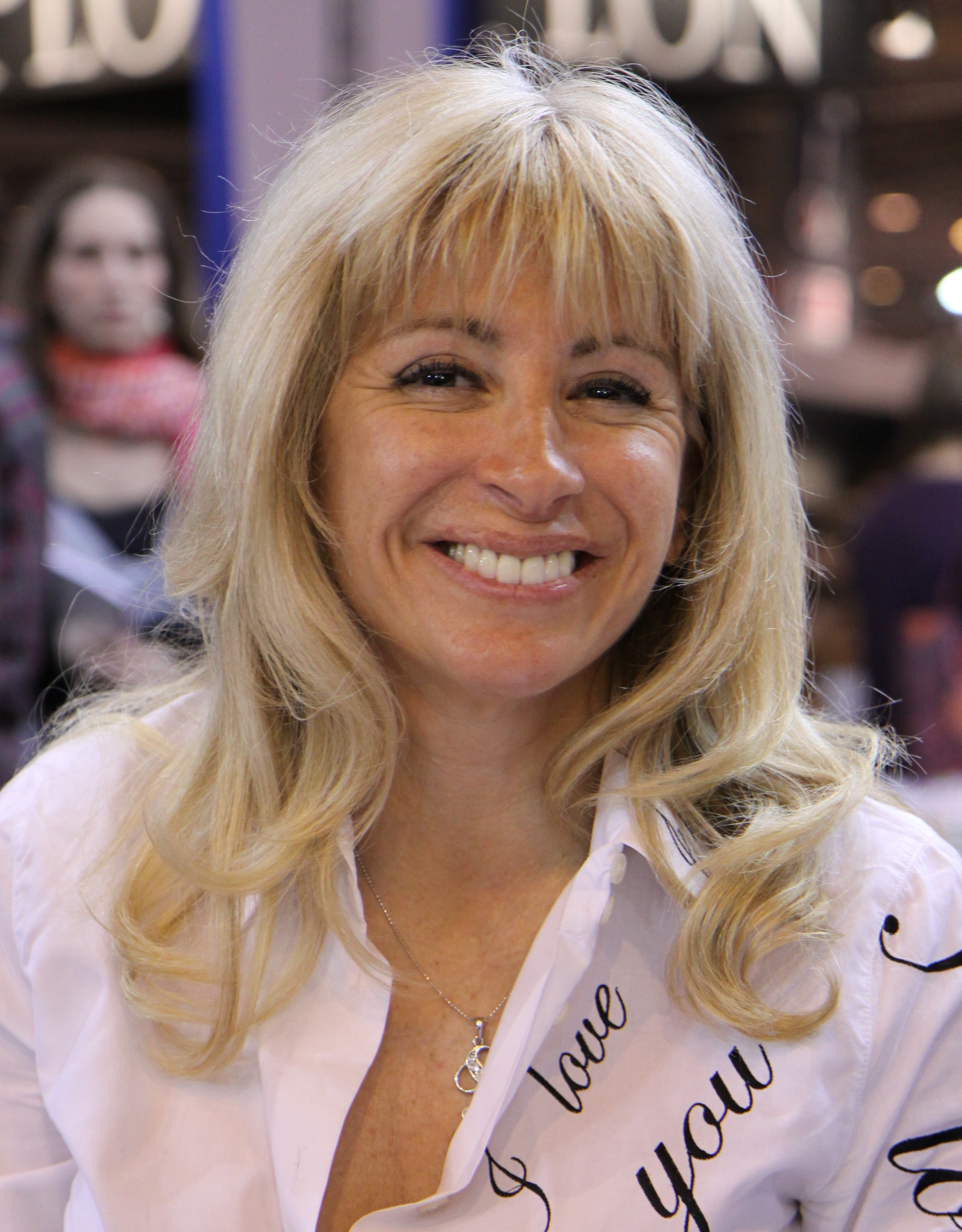
- Sophie Audouin-Mamikonian at the 30th Paris Book Fair at Porte de Versailles
- Born: August 24, 1961 (age 65); Saint-Jean-de-Luz, France
- Occupation: Writer
- Relatives: Francis Veber (Uncle)

Sophie Audouin-Mamikonian (born August 24, 1961 in Saint-Jean-de-Luz, France) is a French writer and author of young adult fantasy books, including the popular Tara Duncan series.

== Biography ==
Sophie Audouin-Mamikonian was born in Saint-Jean-de-Luz, France and grew up in the Basque Country where she drew the tales and legends that fuel her imagination. She is married with two daughters, Diane and Marine. She holds a M.A. in diplomacy and strategy. She currently divides her time between family and writing. She is a contributor to Children's Health Fund Children's Health Fund, founded by Paul Simon and Dr. Irwin Redlener and the Princess SAM Foundation for Armenia. She currently lives in Paris.

She is a descendant of the Mamikonian Armenian noble family, and frequently uses as her title "Princess Sophie Audouin-Mamikonian".

Sophie's first writing attempts were sketches of fantasy fiction. She wrote the fantasy novel series Tara Duncan between 1987 and 1990, but only found a publisher in 2003, when magic in books became the trend due to the success of Harry Potter.

Sophie has been honored with the Medal of Legion d'Honneur, and the Medal Of Art et Lettres.

== Bibliography ==
=== Tara Duncan series ===
- Tara Duncan and the Spellbinders, translated by William Rodarmor (Sky Pony, 2012)
- Tara Duncan and the Forbidden Book, translated by William Rodarmor (Sky Pony, 2013)
- Tara Duncan and the Cursed Scepter
- Tara Duncan and the Renegade Dragon
- Tara Duncan and the Forbidden Continent
- Tara Duncan:In Magister’s Trap
- Tara Duncan and the Phantom Invasion
- Tara Duncan and the Evil Empress
- Tara Duncan:Against the Black Queen
- Tara Duncan:Dragons versus Demons
- Tara Duncan:War of the Planets
- Tara Duncan:The Final Battle
- Tara Duncan:Tara and Cal
- Tara Duncan and the OtherWorld Twins

Spinoff Prequel: 450 years ago Beauty's Daughter

The book series has been loosely adapted into a 26-episode animated TV series that is on the Kabillion Cable TV network, produced by Moonscoop, Disney, and M6 and bought by 20 broadcasters. Now the animated series is available on Amazon VOD. Unfortunately it was cancelled before any subsequent seasons could be made to follow the rest of the fourteen books. Very dissatisfied with this Moonscoop studios' mediocre adaptation, Sophie decided to create her own production company "Princess Sam Entertainment Group". PSEG produced a new animated series, through its subsidiary, Princess Sam Pictures, with a film quality, which is very unusual for an animated series, from the volume one of Tara Duncan: The Spellbinders. Tara Duncan and the Spellbinders, the brand new CGI 3D animated series, immediately met with the success the first one didn't have, as every episode has been produced as a small movie. The new series has been bought by: the Walt Disney Company France, Belgium, Japan and Russia, Gulli in France, Di Agostini and RAI in Italy, RTBF in Belgium, RTS in Switzerland, MBC in Middle East, Nelonen in Norway, Tele Quebec in Canada, RTE in Ireland, SIC K in Portugal, Noga in Israel, TVNZ in New Zealand, etc.

=== Indiana Teller series ===
The heir of a werewolf pack in Montana, Indiana Teller is the son of a human and a werewolf. But his human genes blocked his wolf genes and he never turned into a wolf. Rejected by the pack, he leaves to go to the University of Montana to study and embrace his human side. There, he meets a very pretty but mysterious human girl, Katerina. For the first time, Indiana feels like a normal person. And falls in love with Katerina.

Louis Brandkel, the chief of another werewolf pack, seeks Indiana death. His son Tyler, attempts to take Katerina away from Indiana. Katerina and Indiana's relationship faces conflict due to the rule that forbids humans from forming relationship with werewolves, with severe penalties for breaking it.

- Spring Moon, translated by William Rodarmor (published as an e-book by Entangled Publishing, 2013)
- Summer Moon (Michel Lafon press)
- Autumn Moon
- Winter Moon

=== Young Adult works ===
- The Color of Angels' Souls, Volume 1 (published January 5, 2012) (Robert Laffont, Collection R)
- The Color of Angels' Soul, Volume 2 (to be published, 2014) (Robert Laffont, Collection R)

=== Fiction ===
- La dance des obèses (The Fat Man's Dance)
- Nos destins inachevés (our unfinished destinies) a book about immortality based on real facts (Michel Lafon)
