= The Book of Time (novel series) =

French children's novel series

- Cover of the original French release of La Pierre Sculptée, the first novel in the series.
- The Book of Time; The Gate of Days; The Circle of Gold
- Author: Guillaume Prévost
- Original title: Le Livre du Temps
- Country: France
- Language: French
- Genre: Fantasy
- Publisher: Gallimard Jeunesse
- Published: 2006–2008
- Published in English: 2007–2009
- Media type: Hardcover, paperback

"The Book of Time", originally released as "Le Livre du Temps", is a French children's fantasy novel trilogy written by Guillaume Prévost [fr; fa; it; pt] and first published in France by Gallimard Jeunesse. The first book of the series, La Pierre Sculptée, was released in February 2006; the final book was released in November 2008. The trilogy follows fourteen-year-old Sam Faulkner as he travels through time and around the world via a strange statue and some unusual coins with holes in them to find his missing father.

Prévost created the series to help children see how history could be fascinating, basing the central characters on his own children. Scholastic Corporation licensed the series for an English language release in the United States, United Kingdom, and Australia. Translated by William Rodarmor, the first novel was released simultaneously in all three countries under the name The Book of Time in 2007; the final English volume released in 2009.

The series received mixed reviews from critics, with the first book in particular being heavily criticized for lacking depth and for its undeveloped characters. The second novel was better received with reviewers finding it action-packed and praising its conclusion, but noting that it lacked originality.

== Plot ==
After 14-year-old Sam Faulkner's mother Elisa died in a car accident, his father Allan opens the Faulkners Antiquarian Bookstore and moves himself into it while Sam lives with his grandmother, grandfather, his aunt and his aunt's boyfriend and cousin Lily. Like his father, Sam also closes himself up, even closing the door to a girl named Alicia Todds, his crush. Then his father vanishes. Sam waits for him to come home, but more than a week passes without a trace. He goes to the bookstore to search for clues. In a room he'd never seen before, he finds a strange red book called a stone statue with an odd circular indentation in it and a dusty coin with unreadable symbols. Curious, he fits the coin into the statue, and finds himself transported back to a strange island called Iona. He travels to a village there, where he finds another coin. Fitting it into the statue, he is transported again, this time to 800 AD to a Viking village in Scotland. As he finds other coins, he goes to other places, including France during World War I and ancient Egypt where he find a large cache of the coins. Eventually, with help from his cousin Lily, he is able to transport back home. Together, they learn more about the time-traveling statue and a man named Vlad Tepes, the inspiration behind the Dracula legends, who they believe is holding Allan in fifteenth century Wallachia.

Sam and Lily begin searching for a way to reach him, but they are unable to control where the coins take Sam when he uses them. As the series progresses, Sam learns that he will need seven special coins to go to rescue his father. The effort to collect them takes him through a variety of historical locations and events. With the coins collected, he is finally able to rescue his father, only to find him dying and raving. Eventually he realizes his father wants to use the statue to prevent Elisa's death three years ago. Sam uses the coins to try to reach her, being taken through more historical events, as well as to the future where he sees his own grave.

== Creation and conception ==
When interviewed by Children's Literature, author Guillaume Prévost shared that he created the series to help children understand that history could be fascinating and that he strove to be as accurate as possible with the historical backdrop. In discussing the series and his motivations, Prévost explained that he had begun by writing historical novels for adults but felt constrained by the "rules of the genre". Wishing to give greater freedom to his own imagination, he decided to create a juvenile series that would be both entertaining and educational. Being himself a teacher, he bemoaned the fact that (at the time of the interview) the French national education system did not allow use of the book in classrooms, as he felt that there can be a theatrical side to instruction and that the "spoken word can be as evocative as the written one". He explained that when speaking with his own students, he emphasizes the "human side of history" in that even when studying ancient events, one can make comparisons between historical figures and ourselves to find similarities, an approach he uses in the book series.

He then shared that he has a son and daughter who have many of the same qualities of the series protagonists Sam and his cousin Lily, and also shared that he and Sam have many similar traits, such as judo, video games, computers and rock & roll. So he is able in the series to address that 14-year-old he still finds inside himself in order to connect with his readership. As a youth, he was strongly influenced by what he had read, and gives fond credit to works by authors such as Jules Verne, Sir Arthur Conan Doyle, Agatha Christie, Maurice Leblanc, and Gaston Leroux as being instrumental in how he now builds his plots. He also credits his love of science fiction as being another strong influence, and credits such authors as Isaac Asimov, A. E. van Vogt, and Jack Vance as guiding his imagination and allowing him to take stories beyond the purely rational. Summing up his influences, he granted that it was these authors, as well as his intense interest in history, that inspired the stories to appeal to the child he once was.

Speaking toward the difficulties that might have been encountered in creating translations of his works from French to English, he explained that his prior relationships with translators had always been very limited, and that this changed with his introduction to William Rodarmor. He admits that Rodarmor showed as much enthusiasm for his works as he did himself, with Rodarmor wanting to know even small details of plot and story so as to create a more accurate translation of the ideas of the stories beyond a simple translation of word by word.

== Book list ==
Title	Original Release English Release	Length	ISBN
La Pierre Sculptée The Book of Time	February 9, 2006; September 1, 2007	240 pp. (first edition); 224 pp. (first English edition)	978-2-07-057046-1
When Allan Faulkner goes missing, his 14-year-old son Sam finds a strange statue and a coin that allows him to travel through time. Using the statue, he travels through Iona, 800 AD Scotland, France during World War I and ancient Egypt, before his cousin Lily is able to help him return home. Along the way, he gathers a large cache of the coins that he finds in the various locations he visits. Sam and Lily read a red book found near the statue, a book about Vlad Tepes, the inspiration behind the Dracula legends. Believing Sam's father is being held by Tepes in fifteenth century Wallachia, Sam decides to use more of the coins to try to rescue his father.
Les Sept Pièces The Gate of Days	January 25, 2007; October 1, 2008	272 pp. (first edition); 256 pp. (first English edition)	978-2-07-061054-9
Sam and his cousin Lily travel through prehistoric times, Pompeii during the Vesuvius eruption, Chicago and Sainte-Mary Barenboim in 1932. Sam discovers that his father, Allan Faulkner, is trapped in Vlad Tepes Castle, so he sets off through time to get the seven coins needed to rescue his father.
Le Cercle d'or The Circle of Gold	November 21, 2008; September 1, 2009	383 pp. (first edition); 320 pp. (first English edition)	978-2-07-061707-4
Sam's father has fallen into a coma due to his time traveling while in a weakened state. Now possessing the bracelet which will let him travel to specific spots in time, Sam sets out to save his mother from dying when he was 11, in hopes that bringing her back will wake his father.

== Reception ==
Publishers Weekly's reviewer felt that The Book of Time was a "book-long prelude to a much longer story", praising Prévost's ability to efficiently and rapidly set up the story locations. Timothy Capehart of Voya agreed that it was obvious the first book was the start of a longer story, feeling it had no character development with a "tacked on" subplot. He also notes that the teenage characters "often speak with a stilted formality" and awkward phrasing, but was unsure if the translation or the original was to blame. Margaret K. McElderry of the School Library Journal felt readers would "feel cheated" by the ending of the first book as it answers no questions. Kirkus Reviews notes that the story is written "in short, almost jerky vignettes" and lacks depth in plot and character development due to its being the first book of the series. Andrea Sisco of Armchair Interviews praised the first volume, feeling the time-travel elements were fun, though noting there were too many in the first volume.

In reviewing the second book of the series, The Gate of Days, Keri Collins Lewis of Children's Literature Comprehensive Database praised the book for building on the first and building up to the third while having "its own unique story line" and being "action-packed". Cara Chancellor of KLIATT found it to be "lively and captivating" with a "stunning conclusion" that makes up for its lack of originality. Kirkus Reviews felt the series concept as a whole was solid, but feels its "execution is sparse, rough, erratic and uneasily similar to the sensation of skating on thin ice". It panned the second volume as well, hoping the final book would have writing to better "live up to the premise."
