= Bernard Moitessier =

French sailor and writer

- Bernard Moitessier on his boat Joshua in 1969, during the Sunday Times Golden Globe Race
- Born: April 10, 1925.
- Died: June 16, 1994 (aged 69)
- Occupation: sailor
- Known for: the first non-stop, singlehanded, round the world yacht race
- Spouse: Françoise de Cazalet
- Partner: Ileana Draghici
- Children: 4 (including son Stephan)

Bernard Moitessier (April 10, 1925 – June 16, 1994) was a French sailor, most notable for his participation in the 1968 Sunday Times Golden Globe Race, the first non-stop, singlehanded, round the world yacht race. With the fastest circumnavigation time towards the end of the race, Moitessier was the likely winner for the fastest voyage, but he elected to continue on to Tahiti and not return to the start line in England, rejecting the idea of the commercialization of long distance sailing. He was a French national born and raised in Vietnam, then part of French Indochina.

== Vagabond of the South Seas ==
Moitessier grew up next to the sea in Indochina, at the time a French colony which included Vietnam, Laos and Cambodia. He left Indochina at the beginning of the Vietnam War as a crew member of sailing trade junks. In Indonesia he purchased the dilapidated junk Marie-Thérèse in 1952 to travel slowly to France by singlehanded sailing. On the first leg to Seychelles he had to stop her from leaking in the middle of the Indian Ocean by diving underneath the boat at sea. After 85 days of sailing through monsoon weather he ran aground on Diego Garcia. He did not have modern navigational instruments, and was aware of his latitude via sextant observation but was estimating longitude and, as he tells it in "Sailing to the Reefs", neglected a three-knot ocean current, leading to the grounding. He was provided a berth on a supply ship travelling to and from Mauritius island, as Diego Garcia at the time was run by a private company based in Mauritius, and once in Mauritius he worked three years before he could sail again in a boat he had built himself. This he sailed via stops in South Africa and St. Helena to the West Indies, but on a trip from Trinidad to St. Lucia he once again was shipwrecked due to physical exhaustion. Picked up and taken back to Trinidad by friends, he decided to go to France directly, as it seemed the only place he could earn enough to build himself a seaworthy boat. He was able to get work on a cargo ship which got him to France, via Hamburg, where he found work with a medical company whilst writing a book (Vagabond des Mers du Sud) about his experience. He then moved to the south of France, where he married Françoise de Cazalet, the daughter of family friends, with whom he would later sail the world.

With the money from his book, he commissioned a 39-foot steel ketch which he named Joshua, in honour of Joshua Slocum, the first person to sail around the world solo. Finally he and Françoise left Marseille in October 1963, leaving her three children in boarding schools. After wintering in Casablanca they sailed first to the Canaries, then to Trinidad, and through the Panama Canal to the Galapagos Islands. After two years of spending time in each of these places they arrived at Tahiti, but realised that they were running out of time and had just eight months left to return to their children. So Moitessier proposed sailing Joshua home not via the Indian Ocean and Suez Canal, as originally planned, but eastward, via the quickest route, including a passage about the much feared Cape Horn. Upon their arrival in France, at Easter, 1966, they had, without intending it, completed the longest nonstop passage by a yacht in history—14216 nautical miles, over 126 days, a world record which brought him immediate recognition throughout the world yachting community.

== Solo around the world ==
Voyage of Joshua – "The long route"

Discussions between Moitessier and his friends Bill King and Loïck Fougeron about a solo non-stop trip around the world came to the notice of Robin Knox-Johnston who also started preparations before the Sunday Times offered their Golden Globe award for the first to circumnavigate alone, nonstop, and unassisted, and for the fastest elapsed time. Somewhat reluctantly, Moitessier decided to sail Joshua to Plymouth to meet the criterion for the race of leaving from an English port, but left months after several smaller and therefore slower boats.

He departed Plymouth on August 23, 1968 and, after a quick passage south, he was off the Cape of Good Hope by October 20, 1968. In the process of transferring a canister of film and reports for the Sunday Times to a freighter, he allowed the bow of Joshua to be drawn into the stern of the ship, bending the bowsprit, which he was able to fix with winches on board. A couple of days later Joshua was knocked flat by a breaking wave but he was able to recover the damage. A succession of gales and calm periods characterised his trip through the Southern Ocean until he passed Cape Horn on 5 February 1969. During all of that time, he had not received any feedback on the progress of other competitors from local radio stations.

During a calm period in the Indian Ocean, Moitessier became depressed and discovered yoga as a means of controlling his moods. At this time, he started to consider not returning to Europe, which he saw as a cause of many of his worries. The idea of continuing his voyage on again to the Galapagos Islands strengthened as he passed through the Pacific, though he was still determined to complete the circumnavigation first. Having passed Cape Horn, he faced a crisis when a south-easterly gale started blowing him north again, and his account of his thought processes before he turned for the Cape of Good Hope reflects inner turmoil. However, the manner of his resignation, as he tells the story, is a key part of his reputation. By firing a note using a slingshot onto the deck of a passing ship, he was able to get a message to his Sunday Times correspondent, stating: "parce que je suis heureux en mer et peut-être pour sauver mon âme" ("because I am happy at sea and perhaps to save my soul").

Although driven and competitive, Moitessier passed up a chance at instant fame and a world record, deciding to sail onwards for three more months. Sir Knox-Johnston went on both to win the race, as its only legitimate finisher, and to become the first man to circumnavigate the globe alone without stopping.

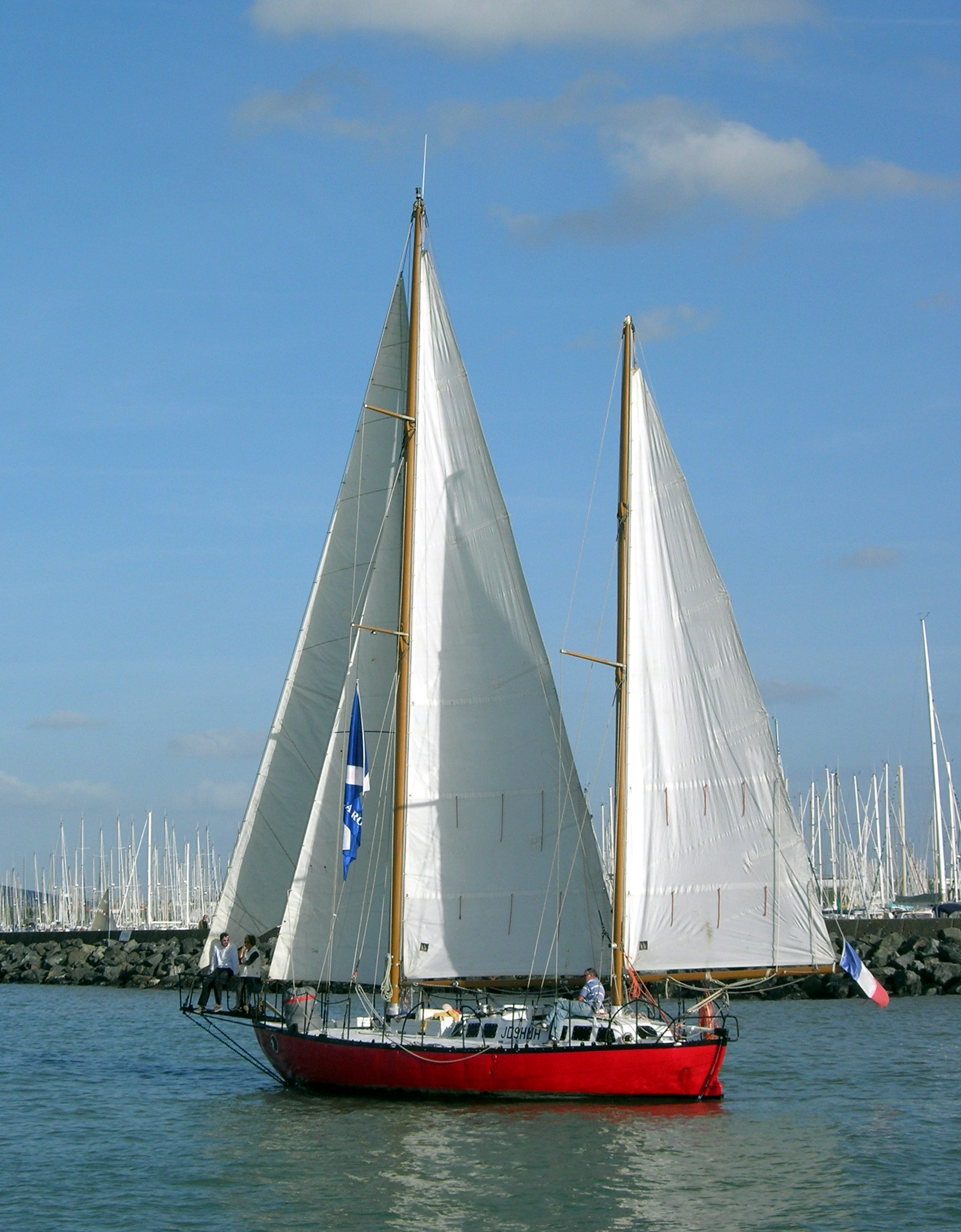
Moitessier's boat Joshua in 2006 in La Rochelle.

Although he abandoned the race, Moitessier still circumnavigated the globe, crossing around the Cape of Good Hope, South Africa, and then sailing almost two-thirds of the way around a second time, all non-stop and mostly in the roaring forties, setting another record for the longest nonstop passage by a yacht, with a total of 37,455 nautical miles in 10 months. Despite heavy weather and a couple of severe knockdowns, he even contemplated rounding the Horn again. Instead, on 21 June 1969, he arrived in Tahiti, where he and his wife had set out for Alicante, Spain, a decade earlier. He thus had completed his second personal circumnavigation of the world, including the previous voyage with his wife.

It is impossible to say whether Moitessier would have won if he had completed the race, as he would have been sailing in different weather conditions than Knox-Johnston. Based on the fact that his time, from the start to Cape Horn, was around 77% of that of Knox-Johnston, it would have been an extremely close race. However Moitessier is on record as stating that he would not have won. Moitessier's book of the experience, The Long Way, tells the story of his voyage as a spiritual journey as much as a sailing adventure and is still regarded as a classic of sailing and adventuring literature.

== Subsequent life ==
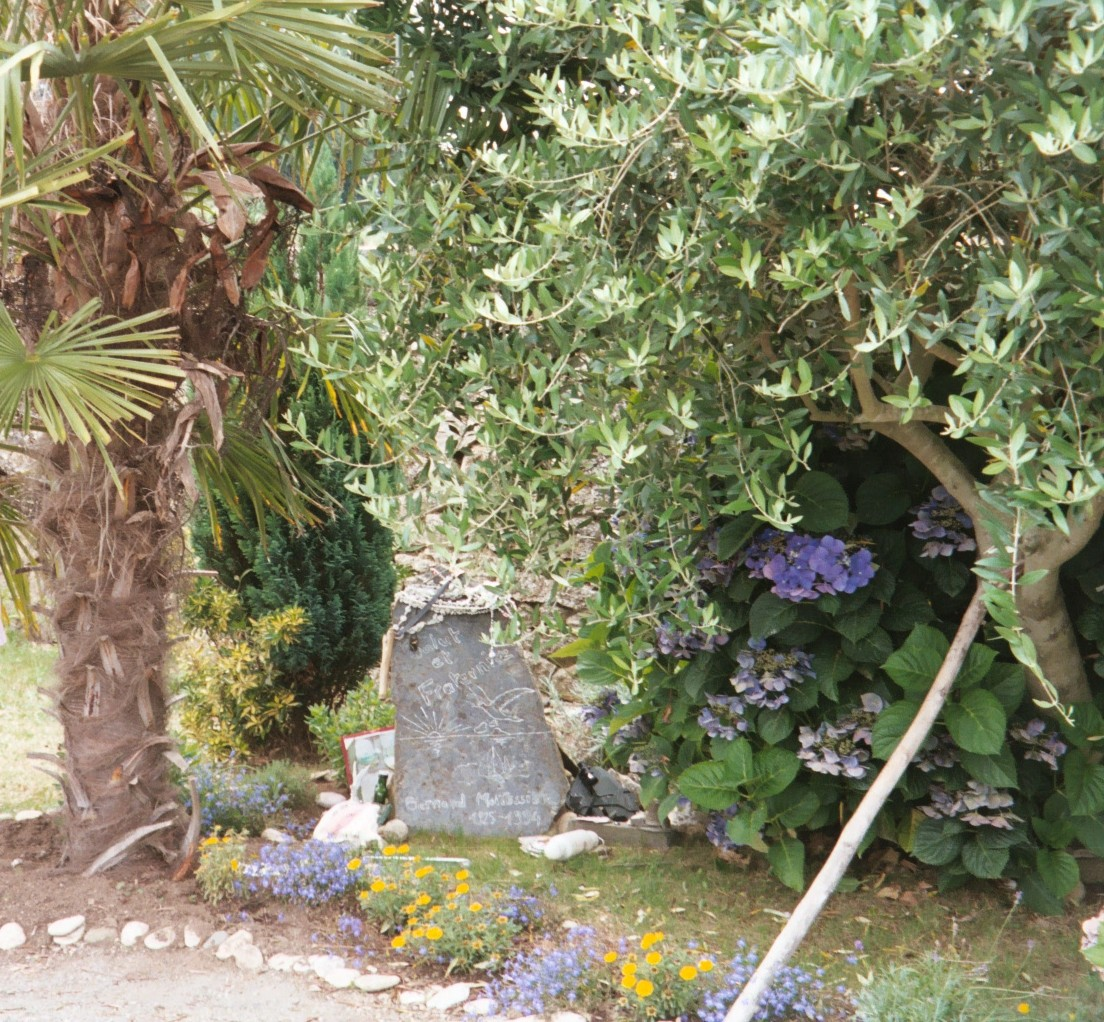
Moitessier's grave in Le Bono, Morbihan, France (photographed in 2004)

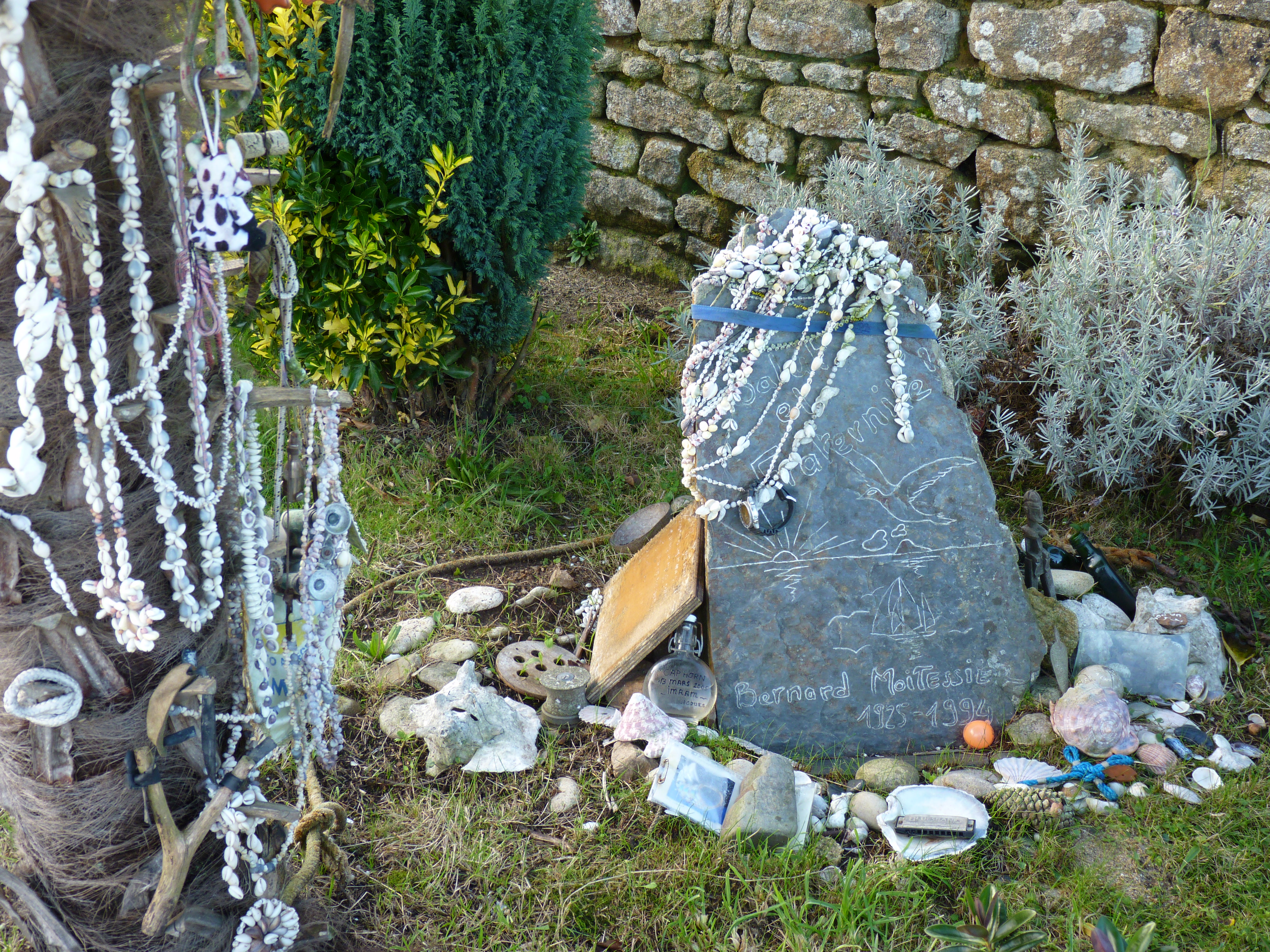
Moitessier's grave in Le Bono, Morbihan, France (photographed in 2010)

It took Moitessier two years to finish the book about his trip to Tahiti, during which time he met Ileana Draghici with whom he had a son, Stephan. They moved to the atoll of Ahe, where Moitessier attempted to cultivate fruit and vegetables. Ileana encouraged him to move to America to complete films about his sailing but he left, after two years, in his boat Joshua.

=== Wreck of the Joshua ===
In December 1982, Moitessier was offered a yacht charter by film actor Klaus Kinski as Kinski was to star in a sailing film and wanted some experience. They sailed from San Francisco to Cabo San Lucas, Mexico and anchored off the beach. In a freak onshore storm Joshua dragged her anchor, was hit and dis-masted by another yacht, Frieling, and then beached along with 25 other yachts. Joshua lay on the beach, damaged and filled with sand. Moitessier and crews from other yachts spent days digging a trench but the salvage costs were too great so he sold the wreck to Reto Filli (Swiss) and Jo Daubenberger (USA) for $20. On a full moon high tide, a trawler towed and a bulldozer pushed the yacht back into the sea and she floated free. Later Paul Clements and Johanna Slee bought the yacht and she ended up in Port Townsend, Washington, United States. In 1990, Joshua was sold by Slee and is now restored and berthed at the Maritime Museum in La Rochelle, France.

After further travels, Moitessier returned to Paris to write his autobiography, Tamata and the Alliance.

Moitessier was an environmental activist who protested against nuclear weapons in the South Pacific and against overdevelopment of the Papeete waterfront in Tahiti.

== Death ==
Moitessier died of prostate cancer on 16 June 1994, and is buried in an informal corner of the main cemetery in Bono, Brittany, France. Visitors to his grave leave gifts such as slingshots.

== Partial list of works ==
- Moitessier, Bernard (1960). Un Vagabond des mers du sud [Sailing to the Reefs]. Translated by Huyghe, René. ISBN 9780713659078.
- Moitessier, Bernard (1967). Cap Horn à la voile: 14216 milles sans escale [Cape Horn: The Logical Route]. Translated by Moore, Inge. Adlard Coles Nautical. ISBN 9780713667073.
- Moitessier, Bernard (1973). La Longue route; seul entre mers et ciels [The Long Way]. Translated by Rodarmor, William. Sheridan House. ISBN 978-1493042784.
- Moitessier, Bernard (1995). Tamata et l'alliance [Tamata and the Alliance]. Translated by Rodarmor, William. Sheridan House. ISBN 978-0924486777.
- Moitessier, Bernard (1998). Voile, Mers Lointaines, Iles et Lagons [A Sea Vagabond’s World]. Translated by Rodarmor, William. Sheridan House. ISBN 978-1574090215.
