= Tara Duncan (TV series) =

- Genre: Animated series Comedy horror
- Created by: Sophie Audouin-Mamikonian
- Based on: Tara Duncan by Sophie Aodouin-Mamikonian
- Directed by: Eric Bastier
- Voices of: Céline Melloul; Isabelle Volpe; Benoît Allemane; Tony Marot; Marie Nonnenmacher; Nathalie Bienaimé; Yan Pichon; Nayeli Forest; Bernard Jung; Cyril Aubin; Gilbert Lévy
- Theme music composer: Mandy Cruz
- Opening theme: "Tara Duncan", performed by Dania Gio
- Ending theme: "Tara Duncan" (Instrumental)
- Composers: Noam Kaniel; Mandy Cruz
- Countries of origin: France; India
- Original language: French
- No. of seasons: 1
- No. of episodes: 26

Production
- Executive producers: Christophe di Sabatino; Benoît di Sabatino; Tapaas Chakravarti; Nicolas Atlan; Maia Tubiana; Laurent Billion
- Producer: Diana Cage
- Running time: 23 minutes
- Production companies: MoonScoop; DQ Entertainment

Original release
- Network: M6; Disney Channel; Disney XD
- Release: 27 June 2010 – 19 June 2011

Tara Duncan (also known as Tara Duncan: The Evil Empress in the United States, which is the title of the eighth novel) is an animated television series co-produced by MoonScoop and DQ Entertainment, with the participation of M6 and Disney Channel, very loosely based on the novel series. The show premiered on 27 June 2010 in France on Disney XD, and aired through 19 June 2011 but was cancelled after 26 episodes. A computer-animated show started airing in August 2022, which follows the book series more.

== Characters ==
=== Main ===
- Tara Duncan is the main character of the series. She's a confident seventeen-year-old (twelve in the book series) highest spellbinder-in-training, and commander of the Alpha Team. She has blue eyes and blond hair with a pale highlight, and her familiar is a pegasus named Gallant. She is very powerful magically as, according to Sparrow in "BFF", she can cause a whole lot of damage with her exceptionally strong powers alone. She tried to ask Master Chem what he knows about her deceased high spellbinder mother, but never gets the chance, even though Sparrow assured her she could ask another time.
- Princess Gloria Daaval is Tara's best friend and animal-loving teammate on the Alpha Team. She is dating a local non-spellbinder blond-haired boy named Edward. She has brown waist-length wavy hair and eyes. Her familiar is a white panther named Sheeba. Her human name/nickname is "Sparrow" to conceal her true identity as both a princess from another world and her bestial curse to turn into a horned, fanged monster whenever she is furious, saddened or scared.
- Caliban "Cal" Dal Salan is the final member of the Alpha Team. He was born to a family of master thieves and outlaws. He owns a video store and is super flirtatious. He has spiky black hair and gray eyes. His familiar is a red fox named Blondin.
- Isabella Duncan is Tara's strict maternal grandmother, who had raised her for the first seventeen years of her life since her parents' demise. She is very passionate about Tara focusing on school and studying her spellbinding, and she has a weird romantic relationship with Tara's literature professor, Mr. Clarence Spade. She has a first cousin named Gabriella who runs a magic shop for advanced mystical artifacts and large or small spellbooks for both low-level, upper-level and topmost-level spellbinders.

=== Recurring ===
- Master Chem is an ancient blue scaled dragon, and the leader and assistant to the Alpha and Beta teams. His full name is Chemnashaovirodaintrachivu and he is the Guardian of the Transit Portals between Earth and Otherworld.
- Manitou Duncan is Tara's maternal great-grandfather who accidentally turned himself into a brown dog permanently; whereas the books, he is immortal but cursed to be trapped in the form of a brown Labrador retriever that has gradually stripped him of his humanity until a spell gives him human speech.
- Robin M'angil is the commander of the Beta Team. He's a half-elf and likes to use an enchanted bow and arrow along with his magic.
- Fabrice Besois-Giron is the half-wolf member of the Beta Team. He and Tara refer to each other as brother and sister and he's very close with his team members.
- Fafnir Forgeafeux is the dwarf member of the Beta Team. She's very hotheaded and hates using magic, which leads to her getting into arguments with her teammates often.
- Sandra Leylocke is a Nonspell that goes to school with Tara. Despite considering themselves enemies, Tara and Sandra spend a lot of time together.
- Olivia "Livia" is a nonspell and Sandra's "best friend" and flunky. She's a petite blonde with big glasses who has a major crush on Cal, completely unaware of his magical abilities and being from Otherworld.
- Edward is a nonspell that loves horror movies and werewolves. He and Sparrow are dating on-and-off throughout the season.
- Jeremy and Jordon Cryista are two brown-skinned fraternal twin nonspells (human beings, mortals) at Tara's high school. People often refer to them as "the Twins" instead of by their first names since it easier.
- Henry Delachasse is a nonspell villain who is a cryptologist bent on capturing some sort of otherworldly creature and revealing their existence to humanity.

=== Supporting ===
- Selena Duncan was Tara's late mother, a top-level spellbinder who was Isabella's only child, and Manitu's late granddaughter. She had met a sudden unfortunate demise when her only child Tara was just two years old. Like her daughter, she had shoulder-length blond hair with a beige streak in it, much unlike her in the books. A picture of her is seen in Tara's room"BFF", with which she asked for guidance as to why she was so mean all of a sudden. According to Serena the Vampire, she was very powerful as she was capable of stopping her from invading Earth many years ago single-handedly. Tara had tried to ask Master Chem what he knew of her mother, but Sparrow assured her she could another time; contrary to the novels, in which she is alive and rescued from her decade imprisonment in Magister's lair, at the end of Tara Duncan and the Spellbinders. She is a supporting character throughout the novels, but is ultimately killed, leaving Tara an orphan once again.
- Clara "Claire" was an old classmate of Caliban's during his preteen years at Thief School on Otherworld about a decade ago. She was depicted as a nerdy misfit who was not really good at learning magic or thievery; because of these accusations she dropped out and changed her name to "Claire" to conceal herself from further bullying. Her familiar is a white owl. Debuting in "Clairvoyant" (as a play on her new name), she had taken advantage of Tara's trust and friendship to steal for a pack of master thieves as her initiation into their group.
- Gabriela Duncan is Isabella's first cousin who currently runs a magic store full of various mystical artifacts, charms, talismans and spellbooks for spellbinders of all power levels as mentioned in "Summer School." Isabella had wanted to send Tara to her for further training in perfecting her ever developing and increasingly powerful abilities.

== Episodes ==
=== 2010 version ===
No.	Title	French air date	English air date
1	"The Silent Siren"	27 June 2010	2 July 2011
The episode starts with Madney's live rehearsal for the concert taking place later that day. On live television, Madney loses her voice, but it becomes clear to the Alpha Team that a spell had been cast. After researching the spell and the missing Semchanach from Otherworld, the Team discovers that a mute siren named Aquaphonis stole Madney's voice. Tara is forced to audition for "Big Star" with a spell that made her voice better (though Tara is offended by this). The manager, impressed, asks her to sign a record label contract. Sandra is very suspicious, as normally Tara's voice is horrible. She begins to get extremely jealous. In the chaos that Sandra creates, Aquaphonis is able to cast a spell and Tara and Cal steal Tara's spell-amplified voice. But unfortunately for her, Henry Delachasse catches her before she can jump back into the ocean. Cal stops Henri, and Aquaphonis uses the distraction to escape into the water. The Alpha Team follows suit, and Cal casts an approprias to grab one of the voices back from Aquaphonis's necklace. To Tara's horror, it is Madney's voice that she has instead. Finally, she manages to grab Aquaphonis and cast the spell to restore their voices. Master Chem gives Aquaphonis and her daughter their own voices, and then takes them back to Otherworld . After finishing the job, Tara and Sparrow go to the Madney Speer concert, and everything is alright.: This episode is the first to premiere in France and in the production order, but aired as the thirteenth episode in the United States where "The Volcan Heart" aired as the first.
2	"BFFs"	4 July 2010	19 February 2011
Serena the terrible Vampire, and the archenemy of Tara's late mother Selena Duncan, has come from Otherworld and will do whatever it takes to knock Tara off her stride, taking advantage of the young Spellbinder-in-training’s naivety in order to take over the Earth. Fortunately, Cal and Sparrow have got her back and Tara herself has not yet had her say although she is quite annoyed with Sandra who is throwing a party and has invited everyone except her.: A framed picture of a green-eyed, wavy blonde-haired Selena is seen in Tara's bedside table; whereas in the book series, she is depicted as having brown curly hair.
3	"The Golden Scepter"	11 July 2010	26 February 2011
Tara must battle Nelos the harpy, an old friend of Sparrow’s father, who has come to Earth to steal a golden scepter hidden in the Manor. Master Chem has strictly forbidden them from taking the staff out of the Manor under any circumstances, but Tara, Cal and Sparrow find themselves with no other choice but to disobey—and hand it over to the harpy: Nelos has cast a spell on Sparrow that has locked her in her Beast form the night she has a date with Edward!
4	"Gold Fever"	18 July 2010	5 March 2011
Tara, Cal and Sparrow are faced with an evil conspiracy cooked up by harpies who are exploiting Master Chem’s weakness for gold to drive him crazy. The Alpha Team must bring Chem back to his senses but Tara already has her hands full trying to talk Isabella into lending her some money so she can enroll in a dance workshop she would give anything to go to.
5	"The De-Horned Unicorn"	25 July 2010	12 March 2011
Tara, Cal and Sparrow are up against Serena. This time the Vampire has stolen a unicorn's horn with which she intends to absorb the young Spellbinders' powers. But that’s only the half of it! Henry Delachasse manages to steal the unicorn from Serena! Our three young Spellbinders must simultaneously locate the mythical animal and get rid of Serena, who has absorbed Tara’s powers.
6	"Brothers in Fangs"	8 August 2010	26 March 2011
Tara must arrest Lycos, a werewolf that has come to pick up Fabrice, his "brother in fang", to take him to a big werewolf congress on Other World. It just so happens that Fabrice has been captured by Henry Delachasse and they’ve got to get him out of there. Tara will need all the help Cal and Sparrow can give her on this one!
7	"Haute Couture"	22 August 2010	9 April 2011
Tara must unmask Serena, who has come to Earth in disguise with an enormous spider that she intends to use to set a trap for our young Spellbinder friends. As for Sparrow, she’s in deep trouble: she has just discovered that Sandra has stolen her diary—our heroes’ secrets might soon be revealed to all!
8	"Master Chem's Honor"	5 September 2010	23 April 2011
Tara, Cal and Sparrow want to prove Master Chem’s innocence. He has been accused of fleeing a combat on Earth against a black dragon named Kouzu. Chem’s future is in jeopardy. Meanwhile, Sparrow is troubled, as she believes Edward may have uncovered her secret.
9	"The Mirror of Youth"	19 September 2010	7 May 2011
Krislak, a dangerous elf, has come to take the Mirror of Youth that is hidden inside the Manor. While Isabella is trying to stop him from carrying out his plans, the mirror reflects her face and Tara’s grandmother finds herself turned back into a sixteen-year-old teenager! As for Cal, he has sworn he will seduce the famous singer Madney Speer, who is coming to Rosemond for a school dance party.
10	"Disenchanted"	10 October 2010	21 May 2011
Tara, Cal and Sparrow try to stop Sandra, who has been possessed by the spirit of Master Chem’s former mentor, an all-powerful but senile dragon by the name of Shoonavarinatalapatoom or Shoo. As if the situation weren’t already complicated enough, Tara and Sandra take part in a contest the lucky winner of which will get to be in Madney Speer’s latest music video.
11	"Mer-Made"	24 October 2010	4 June 2011
Tara has been poisoned by Lorelei, a mermaid from OtherWorld, and she is turning into a mermaid herself! Tara and Sparrow must find an antidote or else the young Spellbinder will have to make her home in the water for good! But, unbeknownst to the girls, Lorelei is a childhood friend of Cal's.
12	"Alpha Male"	7 November 2010	18 June 2011
Tara, Cal and Sparrow, backed up by Robin from the Beta Team, are faced with an evil Elf who has come to Earth to take revenge against Robin’s father, head of the Secret Service on OtherWorld. Robin’s presence upends Cal completely but he had better overcome his jealousy if he is to come to Tara and Sparrow’s aid in their moment of need.
13	"The Volcan Heart"	21 November 2010	12 February 2011
Tara, Cal and Sparrow are up against the werewolf Hypnos, who has "bewitched" Manitou to make him reveal the whereabouts of some special rubies that can be strung together to form a necklace they say can make people fall in love. Could such an object really exist? This is the question Cal has on his mind because today is Valentine’s Day and he plans to take advantage of this romantic occasion to get closer to Tara.
14	"Cyrano of Otherworld"	12 December 2010	16 July 2011
Tara must find her English literature professor, who has disappeared without a trace, while Isabella has fallen for the charms a smooth-talking Semchanach! It turns out that the Semchanach is the one holding the professor captive, forcing him to write love poems for him. In the midst of all this, the Manor, delighted to see Isabella in such a playful mood, plays a string of practical jokes on the young spellbinders.
15	"Clairvoyant"	26 December 2010	30 July 2011
Claire, a Nonspell, turns up unannounced at the Manor and quickly becomes fast friends with Tara. But when Chem and Isabella discover she has magic powers and decide to send her to OtherWorld against her will, Tara decides to take matters into her own hands… and finds herself mixed up in an unexpected adventure!: The title is a play on the extrasensory/psionic ability of clairvoyance
16	"Summer School"	9 January 2011	13 August 2011
Tara is at odds with her own grandmother, Isabella, who wants to send her to an advanced spell-casting camp on OtherWorld! Anteos, a "strange" harpy, chooses this precise moment to show up on Earth, putting Master Chem in a very awkward position. Called in by Tara to stand up for her, he finds himself forced to battle Isabella, who has challenged him to a duel.
17	"The Four Parchments"	23 January 2011	27 August 2011
Tara, Cal and Sparrow have got their hands full with Serena, who is back again, trying to gain control of the transfer portals. This time around, Fafnir, is the one that will get the young Spellbinders out of trouble as she is the only one who has the power to walk through walls.
18	"Heart of Stone"	13 February 2011	10 September 2011
The Manor is not in its normal state: the Living Stone is giving ludicrous responses, the Manor's rooms transform without warning, and a mummy is roaming the halls—all while Isabella and Manitou are away! Tara, Cal and Sparrow have to work out what’s going on... In the process, they find themselves faced with Karlos, a dangerous elf, and his cousins.
19	"Assault on the Manor"	13 March 2011	24 September 2011
While Chem and Isabella are away at a conference, Tara and Sparrow invite their Nonspell friends over for a games night but three nosy gate-crashing werewolves show up at the party! Meanwhile, Cal has volunteered to go along to the conference with Isabella hoping to spend some quality time lounging around by the hotel pool.
20	"The Cup of Invincibility"	27 March 2011	8 October 2011
Louxos and Kerberos, two fearsome werewolves, turn up on Earth in search of a silver cup that will make them immune to silver! And Henri de Lachasse just happens to have organized a dog contest the first prize of which is the famous cup! Tara, Cal and Sparrow must find a way to enter the contest, and what could be better than entering Manitou!
21	"As If by Magic"	10 April 2011	15 October 2011
Tara, Cal and Sparrow are up against Ptenos and Ephesos, two harpies who intend to kidnap a stage magician and his lovely assistant who have been hired to perform at Tara’s end-of-year school gala night. The harpies mistakenly believe the performers are powerful Spellbinders and when the assistant vanishes into thin air, Tara has to stand in for her at the last minute.
22	"Guardian of My Heart"	24 April 2011	22 October 2011
Tara, Cal and Sparrow must stop Amrod, a young magic-crystal-collecting elf. This assignment could have been like so many others, except that there is a little surprise in store for Tara: the moment Amrod sets eyes on her, he falls instantly in love, and clearly, he is as surprised by it as she is! As for Cal, he falls head over heels in love with Vahina, one of his customers at the video store.
23	"The Gold and the She-Dragon"	8 May 2011	5 November 2011
Master Chem is in love with an adorable dragon named Mel, but when he invites her to spend the weekend with him on Earth, she becomes the number one suspect for a robbery in which gold was stolen from one of Rosemond’s banks. Tara and her team take it upon themselves to prove Master Chem’s innocence to stop him from being relieved of his duties, and to allow him to enjoy a carefree romantic weekend.
24	"Boil, Bubble, Troil, Trouble"	22 May 2011	19 November 2011
After battling a mermaid who ended up getting away, Tara and Sparrow break out in boils. Master Chem must call on the Beta Team to catch the mermaid and find out why she came to Earth. Panicking at the idea that Robin and Fabrice are coming to the Manor while they are disfigured, Tara and Sparrow decide to try and heal themselves despite Isabella’s orders to await an OtherWorld healer.
25	"A Familiar Air"	5 June 2011	3 December 2011
Things couldn’t get worse for Robin: Scarela, a terrible harpy, has captured his familiar and is using it to torture him: he has come to tell the Alpha Team that they must find Scarela as quickly as they can. But Tara and her friends have no idea that this is all part of an even more devious trap.
26	"The Naughty Little Vampire"	19 June 2011	17 December 2011
Master Chem gives the Alpha Team a new assignment: they must watch over the son of the President of the Land of Vampires on OtherWorld and protect him from Serena who is trying to kidnap him. Little Vlad’s stay at the Manor is going to be all action for Tara, Cal and Sparrow as the little guy has one thing on his mind: to become a Semchanach! Meanwhile, Tara has to represent her school in a "street ball" tournament.: This leaves the show cancelled after this episode without any explanation as to why no more seasons have been produced to officially complete the series to follow up on the book series.

=== 2022 version ===
No.	Title	Original release date	English air date
1	"Otherworld"		
2	"The Cursed Tree"		
3	"The Lowcospeedian Beast"		
4	"The Colors"		
5	"The Golden Cows"		
6	"The Gorgeous Bird"		
7	"The Camelin Plant"		
8	"The Spatchoons"		
9	"The Centaur's Staff"		
10	"Fafnir"		
11	"The Magicazes"		
12	"The Book That Knows Everything"		
13	"Baby Chem"		
14	"The Warrior Dwarves"		
15	"The Violinist"		
16	"The Memorus"		
17	"Coach Angelica"		
18	"Cookie Castle"		
19	"The Tornado"		
20	"Scaredy Sheeba"		
21	"Master Chem's Staff"		
22	"The Potion"		
23	"The Painting"		
24	"Magister Hires"		
25	"Tara on the Throne"		
26	"Where is the Ore?"		
27	"The Elf on the Cover"		
28	"Flower Power"		
29	"Teenage Galla"		
30	"The Car"		
31	"Meme vs Lowcospeed"		
32	"Fafnir and Magic"		
33	"The Gardeners"		
34	"The Teapot"		
35	"Fafnir Races"		
36	"Dark Blondin"		
37	"The Diaries"		
38	"Lady Kali Returns"		
39	"Exchanged"		
40	"The Great Golden Bird"		
41	"Egg-Cellent"		
42	"Without Magic"		
43	"The Ogre"		
44	"A Thousand Forms"		
45	"King Lazy"		
46	"Blaliban Dal Salan"		
47	"Nighty Night"		
48	"Casa de la Emperatriz"		
49	"The Hat"		
50	"Happy Birthday Tara"		
51	"Magister and the Beast"		
52	"Carol is a Star"		

== Broadcast ==
The show premiered on 12 February 2011 in the United States, and was cancelled on 10 December 2011.
