= Blood Sword (gamebook series) =

Gamebook series by Oliver Johnson and Dave Morris

- The Battlepits of Krarth cover art
- The Battlepits of Krarth; The Kingdom of Wyrd; The Demon's Claw; Doomwalk; The Walls of Spyte
- Author: Oliver Johnson and Dave Morris
- Illustrator: Russ Nicholson
- Cover artist: Danny Flynn
- Country: UK
- Language: English
- Publisher: Knight Books
- Published: 1987-88
- Media type: print
- No. of books: 5

Blood Sword is a series of gamebooks created by Oliver Johnson and Dave Morris and published by Knight Books in the late 1980s. The books were illustrated by Russ Nicholson and the maps supplied by Geoff Wingate. It was set in the authors' own fantasy world of "Legend" which was also the setting for their Dragon Warriors role playing game.

== Gameplay ==
The series was designed to allow cooperative play for up to four players, combining elements of traditional gamebooks with role-playing mechanics.

== The world of Legend ==
The world of Legend has noticeable parallels with Earth in the late 10th century AD, with strong elements of Christian, Greek, Roman, Norse and Arabian mythology. Crusaders of the 'True Faith' (an analogue of Christianity) have defeated the Ta'ashim people (an analogue of Islam) and conquered the Outremer. As the timeline approaches 1000 AD, Millennialist fever grips many.

After emerging victorious from the Battlepits of Krarth (book 1), where a deadly contest is held every thirteen months, you - a hero (or a group of heroes) belonging to the True Faith - are involved in a bloody battle against a pack of werewolves (book 2). Having defeated the pack, you receive a jeweled scabbard from a dying harpist - it's the scabbard of the Sword of Life, dubbed Blood Sword in popular folklore.

You will need to find the missing parts of the sword - first the hilt, then the blade - in order to slay the coming True Magi, who were killed in the Blasting - a major cataclysm - six hundred years ago, and now want to rule the world on their return. Only the Blood Sword, the bane of the undead, can stop them. So you travel to the northern land of Wyrd, where the Warlock-King guards the hilt from inside his Palace of Eternal Dusk. Then your journey takes you south (book 3), to Crescentium - the main port of the Outremer. There you will find several allies - among whom the assassin leader Hasan-i-Sabbah - who will help you find the blade. But your old enemy Aiken - a Yamatese warrior, known in the lands of the West by the name of Icon the Ungodly - will eventually find you, and after you defeat him for the second time Icon falls down to Sheol, the realm of the dead, taking the Blood Sword with him.

So you will have to enter Sheol (book 4), a patchwork of hells from different mythologies, where a mysterious man who goes by the name of the Traveller takes you through a long journey which ends before archangel Azrael. Here you discover that the Traveller is no one else but Icon, your arch-enemy, whom you finally manage to kill, thus retrieving the Blood Sword. In the last book, while the Millennialist fever is engulfing the continent, you travel north once more to enter the citadel of Spyte, where the True Magi are going to reincarnate at midnight at the end of the millennium. You finally defeat them with the help of Karunaz, a Ta'ashim noble warrior, son of Hasan-i-Sabbah. It's now midnight of Winter's Eve, 999 AD - Judgment Day has come, and you are rewarded with eternal life in Paradise.

== Gameplay ==
The book series differed from many of the Fighting Fantasy and Choose Your Own Adventure type books of the era by being designed for multi-player, co-operative play (though there was also a single-player option, and one player could control more than one character at a time).

A party could consist of up to four players, with each player being either a Sage, Enchanter, Trickster or Warrior. Each of the classes was well-balanced and offered a different playing style from the others. Characters advanced in level, gaining power as the series progressed, and were carried forward from book to book, giving the experience of one long story.

Each player was autonomous - often paragraphs would be for one player's eyes only, and he would be privy to some information that he was free to withhold from the rest of his party.

=== Combat ===
Combat took place on mini-maps consisting of squares, with players able to use tactical combat options to defeat their foes. This added a dimension of realism to the game, for players had to move to their enemies before fighting them, and if it were a surprise attack, their enemies would start near or next to them. Some mini-maps include a square for fleeing; if the players wish to flee from the battle, they must move to that square before turning to the appropriate paragraph.

Sometimes there would be impassable obstacles on maps which characters would have to get around, or squares impassable to players but usable by monsters (e.g.: burning hot coals).

=== Classes ===
- Warrior: The typical hack-and-slash, honourable fighter. He can absorb and deal the most damage, but does not have any unique skills and must also act honourably or face penalties.
- Trickster: A cunning and charismatic thief, albeit one with a heart.
- Sage: A warrior-monk with mystical powers such as levitation and healing, as well as knowledge of ancient lore. There are many occasions when a Sage's wisdom is called upon to solve a problem or provide more information about something.
- Enchanter: A mage who starts the game with a long list of spells.

=== Attributes ===
- Fighting Prowess: A measure of how powerful a fighter the character is.
- Psychic Ability: An indicator of the character's resistance to attack spells and (in the case of an Enchanter) his or her aptitude for magic.
- Awareness: The character's speed, dexterity and cunning.
- Endurance: Measures the character's state of health; wounds are deducted from Endurance and if it reaches zero, the character dies.

== Books in the series ==
The series consisted of five books:

1 : The Battlepits of Krarth "Every thirteen lunar months the Magi of Krarth hold a deadly contest to see which of them will rule that bleak and icy land. Teams of daring adventurers are sent down into the labyrinths that lie beneath the tundra, each searching for the Emblem of Victory that will win power for their patron. Only one team can survive. The others must die."

2 : The Kingdom of Wyrd "From the Palace of Eternal Dusk, the Warlock-King holds his realm in thrall. His tyrannized subjects live in perpetual fear, for they know their evil monarch can see into the minds of others and slay them in their dreams. Only outsiders from beyond the boundaries of Wyrd may slay the tyrant - and they will need all the courage and skill that mortals ever can possess."

3 : The Demon's Claw "Will you survive the perils of the desert city of Crescentium? The wandering ghouls and assassins? The half-human monsters? The dreaded Seven-in-One? For this is a land of sorcery and treachery - where you will encounter terrors and wonders more fabulous than you had ever dared imagine - the great Roc, the three wishes, the ship of the Pirate-King, the flying horse, the magic of the beautiful Psyche. And who shall win the Sword of Death, the Demon's Claw itself?"

4 : Doomwalk "Of all the desperate adventures, this is the most desperate - and the most vital. Only two years remain before the year 1000, when the Magi's power will have waxed full and the moment of their reincarnation will be at hand! All is not lost; if you can recover the fragments of the Blood Sword, the Magi can be opposed. But to do so, you must travel to the land of death..."

5: The Walls of Spyte "In the darkening sky above, five ominous stars have come into conjunction for the first time in 200 years. Out of the vault of the sky they cast their baleful influence across the frozen landscape. They are the disembodied spirits of the last of the Magi, seeing the return to the mortal world at midnight and ushering in a new era of terror. You wield the sole force in the world capable of destroying the Magi. The Sword of Life is mankind's only hope but it is no guarantee of victory. The Magi have had two centuries of exile to plan their reincarnation. To stop them you will need greater courage and strength than ever before!"
