= Shootout at the Saloon =

1982 flip-book game published by Nova Game Designs

Bounty Hunter: Shootout at the Saloon is a combat picture book game published by Nova Game Designs in 1982 that simulates an Old West shootout between a lawman and an outlaw. The game uses two picture books to delineate combat, similar to the air combat game Ace of Aces. Shootout at the Saloon was supposed to be the first in a series of Bounty Hunter games that would encompass an entire town, but critical reception and sales were tepid, and no further games in the line were published.

== Description ==
Bounty Hunter: Shootout at the Saloon is a two-player combat game in which one player, the "Lawman", has become aware of an "Outlaw" (the other player) at the town saloon. The Lawman tries to wound the Outlaw in order to arrest him, or kill him if the Outlaw starts shooting.

Each player chooses one of the two picture books, either "Lawman" or "Outlaw", and chooses one of the fourteen locations in and around the town saloon as a starting point, as well as the direction they are facing. They then both turn to the appropriate page in their respective books, which will show an illustration of their character's current point of view. For example, the Lawman may be out on the street facing the saloon doors, while the Outlaw decides to rob the bartender, and so chooses the spot inside the saloon facing the bar. Both players decide on what action they will take on their first turn — (stay in place, turn, move in a particular direction, or aim). A number at the bottom of the page refers them to the new page they need to turn to. The new page's illustration shows the new point of view of the character, albeit without the other character in view. The two players simultaneously reveal the page number they are on. A reference at the bottom of each current page tells the players which new page number they each need to turn to. This new page will show the same point of view as before, but now with the other character in view (if the other character is visible).

For example, the Lawman standing outside the saloon is on page 311 to start the game, and currently has a view of the saloon doors.

- On the first turn, the Lawman decides to walk into the saloon. The icon for walking straight ahead on the bottom of the page refers the Lawman player to page 332. Turning to that page, the Lawman now sees the dim interior of the saloon, with the bar on one side and the back door of the saloon straight ahead.
- Also on the first turn, the Outlaw turns towards the back door of the saloon to escape; the "Outlaw" book sends the player to page 174, which shows a close-up of the back door.
- Each player shares with the other what page they are currently on: 332 for the Lawman, and 174 for the Outlaw. At the bottom of the Lawman's page, the Outlaw's number 174 sends the Lawman to page 221, where the same dim interior of the saloon is shown, but now with the Outlaw running away towards the back door.
- Meanwhile the Outlaw book tells the Outlaw player to stay on page 174, the close-up of the back door. The Outlaw player is unaware that the Lawman is standing behind him.
- On the next turn, the Lawman can attempt to shoot the fleeing Outlaw as the Outlaw heads into the back alley.

=== Combat ===
In the Advanced game, during combat, the shooter chooses an aim point on a silhouette of the opponent, and rolls a die. A Combat Results Table provides the amount of deviation from that point — which may change the shot from a mortal wound to just a graze or vice versa — and the damage inflicted.

== Publication history ==
In 1980, history teacher Alfred Leonardi created the innovative game Aces of Aces, which used two picture books to show each player what their World War I pilot was seeing. A college student, Douglas Kaufman, helped to develop the game. The game was published by Gameshop Inc. — later to become Nova Game Designs — in 1980. The game was a bestseller, won a Charles S. Roberts Award, and was later inducted into the Origins Awards Hall of Fame.

In 1982, Leonardi tried using the same system of two picture books to develop a Western shootout game, aided by Joe Angiolillo and Mike Vitale. Leonardi's concept was to create a modular game system called Bounty Hunter starting with just the saloon of a Western town, and then expand new locations in the town with each successive game module. The first of this planned series was Shootout at the Saloon, and featured 14 different spots where a character could start from or move to. Sales were poor, and no more games were produced for the Bounty Hunter series.

In 1987 the French game publisher Gallimard released a French version.

== Reception ==
Critics were largely unimpressed by the game, mainly because there were only 14 spots where a character could stand, which did not seem to offer very many options.

In Issue 24 of The Wargamer, Kieron Doyle found the combat rules "neat, clever, and work very well." But he thought that "The downfall of the game is its limited movement. With only 14 locations your options are very restricted [...] Despite all the barrels, sacks and the horse trough which would afford excellent cover, your only course of action is to stride boldly into the middle of the street with nothing to hide behind except your Colt 'Peacemaker'." Doyle concluded "The intermediate and advanced rules add a lot more fun to the shootout [...] but do nothing to overcome the movement restrictions."

In Issue 58 of The Space Gamer, David McCorkhill noted, "The views are well-drawn and the pages are bigger than Ace of Aces. The rules for campaigning are more complete. The Advanced Game silhouette system has been well thought through and improves the concept in realism [...] Unfortunately, page-size, campaigning, and combat resolution had nothing to do with why flipbooks became so popular with the Ace of Aces system." McCokhill concluded the game was "a dull idea well executed. I recommend the game only to those so enamored with the idea of seeing what their character sees that they have to have every flip-book that comes out, and to those so anxious to shell out $80+ for the whole series that they must spend the first $17 right now."

Games chose Bounty Hunter for inclusion in their "1982 Games 100", their choice of the top 100 games of the year, noting, "More than one set of these books can be used at a time for an excellent multiplayer version."

In Issue 15 of the Australian wargaming magazine Queensland Wargamer, Kevin Flynn warned readers about the limited scope of the game, noting that the game was "set in and around a saloon, later books will expand from this into other buildings such as the Fort, Jail Doctor's, etc. If you buy it and like it, you may be committing yourself to a $100+ game series." Despite this, Flynn concluded, "I personally prefer it to Ace of Aces and do recommend it."

In Issue 18 of the French games magazine Casus Belli, Jacques Rauer commented, "The system is striking in its originality and simplicity — a simplicity that remains intact even when more duelists join in or when the difficulty is increased through the addition of extra rules."

In Issue 18 of the French games magazine Jeux et Stratégie, Michel Brassinne called this "A truly brilliant game that makes you want to start playing right away." Brassine noted, "it is rare to find a tactical, simultaneous-play game—one that’s dice-free, highly accessible, and genuinely fun. The surprise grows even greater when you discover that you can choose your own weapon (from a Colt .45 or a Derringer to a "Peacemaker") and that your character gains experience by emerging victorious from duels." Brassine concluded, "The only valid excuse for not rushing out to buy *Bounty Hunter* is a lack of English proficiency. We are eagerly awaiting a French translation." The French version of the game, Le Sherif et le Hors-la-loi (The Sheriff and the Outlaw), was published 5 years later and was reviewed in Issue 44 by Thierry Paunin, who commented, "The very thing that gives Shérif et hors-la-loi its strength — the atmosphere of the hunt — is also its weakness. When you can't see your opponent, you're filled with anxiety; when you finally do see them, it spells the end for either them or you in the very near future. This creates greater suspense, but less tactical depth than in Ace of Aces.

In a retrospective review in Issue 5 of Simulacrum, Joe Scoleri called Bounty Hunter "a valiant attempt to expand (or capitalize on?) the ingenious Ace of Aces system. This game of 'hide and seek at the saloon' does not succeed in generating the same level of excitement as the World War I dogfights of its predecessor. In addition, the tiny playing area severely diminishes the replay value as compared to Ace of Aces." Scoleri concluded, "A nice try, but it was hardly a surprise when the Bounty Hunter expansions failed to materialize."
