= Virtual Reality (gamebooks) =

Virtual Reality was the name of a series of six gamebooks released in 1993 and 1994. Four of the books were written by Dave Morris, and two by Mark Smith.

== Game system ==
The game system used in the series is unusual for gamebooks, in that there is no use of dice or other random elements. Instead, the player picks a number of skills from a list, and may be directed to different paragraphs based on whether or not they have a particular skill. The list of skills is similar, but not identical, from one book to the next.

In addition, players may pick up different items and 'keywords', and these may also be used to direct players to different paragraphs, as in other gamebook series.

== Reprints ==
Dave Morris' 'Heart of Ice', which was highly regarded by many gamebook fans, was reprinted in 2000. The series is to be published in electronic format by Osprey Publishing.
