= California Magazine =

Magazine published by the University of California, Berkeley

California
- Categories: Alumni magazine
- Frequency: Quarterly
- Founded: 1897
- Company: Cal Alumni Association
- Country: United States
- Based in: University of California, Berkeley
- Language: English
- Website: alumni.berkeley.edu/california-magazine
- ISSN: 0008-1302

California Magazine is a general-interest magazine and website that covers the news, issues, discoveries, and people of the University of California, Berkeley. It was founded in 1897 and is published by the Cal Alumni Association, a non-profit organization. The print edition is published four times annually. Wendy Miller, formerly of the Los Angeles Times and the San Francisco Chronicle, is the editor-in-chief. California Magazine contributors have included Michael Pollan, Pat Joseph, Seth Rosenfeld, Jon Carroll, Sophie Brickman, Yousur Alhlou, Chris A. Smith, and Sandy Tolan.

== History ==
The magazine has varied in name and frequency, appearing monthly, bi-monthly (-2009) and latterly quarterly (2009-), and was for a large part of its history known as California Monthly.
