= Dragon Warriors =

Fantasy role playing game system

- Dragon Warriors Book 1 cover
- Designers: Dave Morris; Oliver Johnson (writer)
- Publishers: Corgi Books
- Publication: 1985
- Genres: Fantasy
- Systems: Custom

Dragon Warriors is a fantasy role playing game (RPG) system written by Dave Morris and Oliver Johnson and published by Corgi Books in 1985 and 1986. In 2009, it was re-collected in a new hardcover edition by Mongoose Publishing. This print run included the publication of several supplements to the Dragon Warrior's world "Legend". However, as of September 2010, this publication run had been discontinued but the books continue to remain available in PDF format.

Unlike most RPGs which are primarily presented as box sets or large hardback or softback books, Dragon Warriors consisted of six paperback books of ordinary size.

Dragon Warriors is set in the world of Legend, the same as that of the Blood Sword game books.

As of April 2011, Serpent King Games is the licence holder of Dragon Warriors, and has re-published updated versions of the Mongoose books which are available on DriveThruRPG.com .

== Books: Original Series ==
Books 1-3 were published together and established a coherent and fully featured, if lightweight game system. The latter three books were released one at a time and added depth to the game.

=== Book 1: Dragon Warriors ===
Dragon Warriors (ISBN 0-552-52287-2) was the original book. It included rules for combat, a listing of weapons and armour, and a selection of opponents. The game offered a choice of warrior classes, Knight and Barbarian, as well as the necessary information required to play a Human, a Dwarf, or an Elf. The book was published in 1985 and has 208 pages.

=== Book 2: The Way of Wizardry ===
The Way of Wizardry (ISBN 0-552-52288-0) expanded the original game to include magical spells, potions, and devices. It added Mystic and Sorcerer to the available classes. It was published in 1985 and has 176 pages.

=== Book 3: The Elven Crystals ===
The Elven Crystals (ISBN 0-552-52289-9) provided three long adventure scenarios, as well as a few new monsters, magic, and items, although the scenarios make up the bulk of the book. It was published in 1985 and has 192 pages.

=== Book 4: Out of the Shadows ===
Out of the Shadows (ISBN 0-552-52333-X) added rules for the Assassin class. It includes rules for stealth, martial arts, alchemy, and trance-magic. It also includes a new selection of monsters, which for the most part are more powerful and less common than the ones featured in Dragon Warriors. It was published in 1986 and has 256 pages.

=== Book 5: The Power of Darkness ===
The Power of Darkness (ISBN 0-552-52334-8) added rules for the Elementalist class. It includes new spells as well as an epic adventure scenario making up the bulk of the book. It was published in 1986 and has 192 pages.

=== Book 6: The Lands of Legend ===
The Lands of Legend (ISBN 0-552-52335-6) adds rules for the Warlock class. It also includes several elements for campaign setting such as a complete world map and the accompanying descriptions of far away lands and cities. Sections are also devoted to popular myths or rare items, both of which lending themselves to become starting points of new adventures. It was published in 1986 and has 272 pages.

== Books: Updated re-release ==
=== Dragon Warriors rulebook ===
Dragon Warriors rulebook (ISBN 978-1-906103-96-5) is the first book of the re-released series. The original material from the six Dragon Warriors books of the 1980s has been re-edited and updated, including new covers and artwork. The new material has been overseen and approved by the original Dragon Warriors authors, Dave Morris and Oliver Johnson, and includes a new introduction to the rulebook by the former. The 8.5" x 11" hardback book was published is 2008, and has 256 pages.

=== Dragon Warriors Bestiary ===
Dragon Warriors Bestiary (ISBN 978-1-906103-99-6) is the second release of the re-released series. It is a supplement containing a large list of monsters from the world of Legend along with a set of Random Encounter Tables for various terrain. It also contains an expanded Treasure/Habitat tables for the new and existing monsters. The book itself is a softback at 88 pages in length and was released in 2008.

=== Dragon Warriors Friends or Foes ===
A supplement containing 36 NPC characters for inclusion in campaigns.

=== Dragon Warriors Players Guide ===
A supplement adding information on Living in Legend, new skills, weapons, and armour, demons and new spells.

=== Cold Fury ===
Taking content from Magnum Opus' In From The Cold, this adds in the previously PDF only adventure, Fury of the Deep.

=== Additional Campaigns ===
Published so far are The Elven Crystals (taken from book 3 of the original series), Prince of Darkness (taken from book 5) and Sleeping Gods (a compilation of the adventures contained in books 1, 2, 4 and 6). The Cursed King is planned, as well as Brymstone, an expansion of the material originally presented in Red Giant magazine.

=== Ordo Draconis ===
An unofficial fanzine ran for 2 issues, and was known as Ordo Draconis. It was produced in pdf-format only, featuring adventures, new professions, and other material for the Dragon Warriors RPG re-release. In August 2010 two fans who had contributed to Ordo Draconis released a 54-page pdf adventure through Magnum Opus Press titled Fury of the Deep; it is a digital-only release that will not be issued in printed form. These are available through sites that sell electronic versions of roleplaying games, such as DriveThruRPG and RPGNow.

=== Red Ruin Publishing ===
Red Ruin is a fan-community-driven organisation. Red Ruin publishes original and accessible content compatible with the Dragon Warriors RPG as an independent fan publisher. Their flagship publication is Casket of Fays, an A5 fanzine, although they have also produced a pair of chapbooks detailing The Adventures of Cedric and Fulk, a series of short adventures and gamebooks intended for solo play, (e.g. The Village of Frogton, Village of the Damned, Icon of Death), and scenarios such as The Fallen Monastery . All of these are available in pdf format from DriveThruRPG and itch.io.

=== Casket of Fays ===
Casket of Fays is an A5 fanzine produced by the Dragon Warriors community and published by Red Ruin on DriveThruRPG. Casket of Fays features adventures, new magic items, non-player characters, new monsters and articles on the lore of Legend, all compatible with the Dragon Warriors RPG. As of August 2026, there are nineteen issues of Casket of Fays available, four of which are available as Print on Demand.

=== Ambula in Fabulam ===
Ambula in Fabulam has produced Cadaver Draconis, content that was originally produced for the Players Guide, and The Nomad Khanates, a guide to The Great Steppes. Both these provide additional content and background for Dragon Warriors and were crafted by the community.

== Game system ==
Like a number of RPGs, Dragon Warriors uses a variety of contextual rule systems rather than a single encompassing game mechanic or dice system. However, there are two primary mechanics within the game. The first is the opposed score system, where an ability value of a character or creature is subtracted from the opposed ability value of another to generate a number that must be rolled below on either a d20 or 2d10. Examples are ATTACK vs. DEFENCE, MAGICAL ATTACK vs. MAGICAL DEFENCE, STEALTH vs. PERCEPTION, and SPEED vs. EVASION. The second main mechanic involves an attribute score being compared to a difficulty score determined by the GM. If the attribute is equal or above to the difficulty, then the character succeeds automatically, otherwise they must roll below their attribute score on d20.

Dragon Warriors requires the use of the whole spectrum of polyhedral dice: d4, d6, d8, d10 (d100), d12, and d20.

== Reception ==
Robert Dale reviewed the first three books in the series - Dragon Warriors, The Way of Wizardry, and The Elven Crystals - for White Dwarf #74, giving it an overall rating of 9 out of 10, and stated that "The three books are well-presented, eye-catching, and should appeal to the uninitiated. The more experienced gamer should appreciate the care that has been taken to provide a fast, unrestrained, yet balanced and fair game."

Wulf Forrester-Barker did a retrospective review of Dragon Warriors for Arcane magazine and stated that "Dragon Warriors was a worthy game but became lost in a sea of many other equally worthy games. Perhaps things would have been different if it had been published by a games company rather than a children's book company. Perhaps it should have been released in a more traditional format? Nevertheless, it remains one of the most prized treasures among my games. I could buy or, with a touch of plagiarism, probably design a better system, but it wouldn't be nearly as convenient. Watch out Legend... I'm coming back."

Dragon Warriors was ranked 48th in the 1996 reader poll of Arcane magazine to determine the 50 most popular roleplaying games of all time. The UK magazine's editor Paul Pettengale commented: "Unfortunately, even though this is a fine, solid system, the format makes it tricky to use in play. Still, it was well received throughout its short life, and is highly collectable these days."

== Reviews ==
- Casus Belli #31 (Feb 1986)

== See also ==
- Blood Sword: A series of gamebooks set in the same fictional world as Dragon Warriors.
