= Dave Morris (game designer) =

British writer and game designer

- Born: David John Morris; 19 March 1957 (age 69); Stoke Poges, Buckinghamshire, England, United Kingdom
- Education: Magdalen College, Oxford
- Spouse: Roz Morris
- Writing career
- Genres: Graphic novels, video games, science fiction, fantasy

David John Morris (born 19 March 1957) is a British author of gamebooks, novels and comics and a designer of computer games and role-playing games.

== Education ==
Dave Morris graduated from Magdalen College, Oxford, where he read Physics from 1976 until 1979.

== Writer ==
Morris began his writing career in 1984 by writing the fantasy adventure gamebook Crypt of the Vampire, part of the Golden Dragon series published by Grafton Books in the UK and Berkley Books in the US.

The following year, Morris and Oliver Johnson created the Dragon Warriors role-playing game. Dragon Warriors was an attempt at releasing a role-playing game in a series of paperback books. In a 1996 reader poll conducted by Arcane to determine the fifty most popular roleplaying games of all time, Dragon Warriors was ranked 48th. In 2008, the game was licensed by Morris to James Wallis of Magnum Opus Press, and Serpent King Games acquired the Dragon Warriors license afterwards.

In 1987, Morris and Johnson created the Blood Sword series, five adventure gamebooks published by Knight Books.

In 1990, Morris and Jamie Thomson wrote The Keep of the Lich-Lord for the popular Fighting Fantasy series of adventure gamebooks.

== Fabled Lands ==
In 1995, Morris and Jamie Thomson wrote the first of several adventure gamebooks in the Fabled Lands series. It received positive reviews, including 20 years later.

Although well-received, the books were published when, as Sylvio Konkol noted, "the golden age of adventure gamebooks was actually over." Morris and Thomson originally envisioned twelve books in the series, but various publishing problems, including underpricing the expensive books and a shrinking market, meant the series was curtailed after only six volumes.

As Massively multiplayer online games (MMOs) became popular in the early 2000s, Morris and Thomson hired the French firm Eidos to convert their books into an MMO. However, Eidos ran out of money before the project was completed.

Twenty-five years after the Fabled Lands books were published, Morris and Thomson granted a license to Prime Games to develop a Fabled Lands computer role-playing game.

== Other works ==
Morris also co-authored a number of other books, including Virtual Reality: Necklace of Skulls with Mark Smith (1993), Blood Sword: The Battlepits of Krarth with Oliver Johnson (1987), the Golden Dragon series, and a number of TV and movie novelisations.

His original novels include Knightmare (a historical fantasy adventure series set in the early 13th century that ties in with the television series of that name), Teenage Mutant Ninja Turtles and the contemporary horror novel Lost Souls. Another horror novel, Florien, was published as an ebook in 2010. In 2008 his episodic comic strip Mirabilis began weekly publication in Random House's subscription-based magazine The DFC. Working with artist Leo Hartas, Morris founded electronic publisher Mirus Entertainment and published Mirabilis for the iPad in December 2010.

In addition to his more than seventy published books, Morris is a leading developer of the Empire of the Petal Throne gaming system (created by MAR Barker and published by TSR), creating a playable rules system (Tirikelu) and editing a fanzine.

Morris also co-authored a book on the computer gaming industry, having worked as a game designer for Eidos and Microsoft, and is a former mentor in the American Film Institute's Digital Content Lab. In April 2012, he published an interactive reworking of Frankenstein in which the reader is able to give advice to the first-person narrator of the story.

== Bibliography ==
Dave Morris's published works include:

=== Blood Sword series ===
- The Battlepits of Krarth (1987, Hodder & Stoughton, ISBN 0-340-40154-0)
- The Kingdom of Wyrd (1987, Hodder & Stoughton, ISBN 0-340-40155-9)
- The Demon's Claw (1987, Hodder & Stoughton, ISBN 0-340-41206-2)
- Doomwalk (1988, Hodder & Stoughton, ISBN 0-340-42397-8)
- The Walls of Spyte (1988, Hodder & Stoughton, ISBN 0-340-49168-X)

=== Chronicles of the Magi ===
- The Sword of Life (1997, Hodder Headline, ISBN 0-340-67298-6)
- The Kingdom of Dreams (1997, Hodder Headline, ISBN 0-340-67299-4)
- The City of Stars (1997, Hodder Headline, ISBN 0-340-67300-1)

=== Crystal Maze ===
- The Crystal Maze (with Jamie Thomson, 1991)
- Crystal Maze Challenge! (with Jamie Thomson, 1992)

=== Dragon Warriors series ===
- Dragon Warriors (1985, Transworld, ISBN 0-552-52287-2)
- The Way of Wizardry (1985, Transworld, ISBN 0-552-52288-0)
- Out of the Shadows (1986, Transworld, ISBN 0-552-52333-X)
- The Lands of Legend (1986, Transworld, ISBN 0-552-52335-6)
- Dragon Warriors (revised edition 2008, Magnum Opus Press, ISBN 978-1-906103-96-5)
- Sleeping Gods (2008, Magnum Opus Press, ISBN 978-1-906508-03-6)
- Bestiary (2008, Magnum Opus Press, ISBN 978-1-906103-99-6)

=== Fabled Lands series ===
- The War-Torn Kingdom (1995, Macmillan, ISBN 0-330-33614-2)
- Cities of Gold and Glory (1995, Macmillan, ISBN 0-330-33615-0)
- Over the Blood-Dark Sea (1995, Macmillan, ISBN 0-330-34172-3)
- The Plains of Howling Darkness (1996, Macmillan, ISBN 0-330-34173-1)
- The Court of Hidden Faces (1996, Macmillan, ISBN 0-330-34431-5)
- Lords of the Rising Sun (1996, Macmillan, ISBN 0-330-34430-7)

=== Fighting Fantasy series ===
- The Keep of the Lich-Lord (1990, Puffin Books, ISBN 978-0-140341-37-9)

=== Golden Dragon series ===
- Crypt of the Vampire (1984, Transworld, ISBN 978-0-583307-49-9)
- Temple of Flame (with Oliver Johnson) (1984, Transworld, ISBN 978-0-583307-48-2)
- The Eye of the Dragon (1985, Transworld, ISBN 978-0-583307-61-1)
- Castle of Lost Souls (with Yve Newnham) (1985, Transworld, ISBN 978-0-583307-62-8)

=== Heroquest series ===
- The Tyrant's Tomb (1993, Corgi Books, ISBN 0-552-52777-7)
- The Screaming Spectre (1993, Corgi Books, ISBN 0-552-52776-9)
- The Fellowship of Four (1993, Corgi Books, ISBN 0-552-52721-1)

=== Knightmare series ===
- Knightmare (1988, Transworld, ISBN 0-552-52540-5)
- The Labyrinths of Fear (1989, Transworld, ISBN 0-552-52608-8)
- Fortress of Assassins (1990, Transworld, ISBN 0-552-52638-X)
- The Sorcerer's Isle (1991, Transworld, ISBN 0-552-52714-9)
- The Forbidden Gate (1992, Transworld, ISBN 0-440-86317-1)
- The Dragon's Lair (1993, Transworld, ISBN 0-440-86328-7)
- Lord Fear's Domain (1994, Transworld, ISBN 0-440-86336-8)

=== Teenage Mutant Ninja Turtles series ===
- Buried Treasure (1990, Transworld, ISBN 0-440-40391-X)
- Sixguns and Shurikens (1990, Transworld, ISBN 0-440-80218-0)
- Sky High (1990, Transworld, ISBN 0-440-40389-8)
- Red Herrings (1990, Transworld, ISBN 0-440-40390-1)
- Dinosaur Farm (1991, Transworld, ISBN 0-440-40491-6)
- Splinter to the Fore (1991, Transworld, ISBN 0-440-40492-4)

=== Virtual Reality series ===
- Down Among the Dead Men (1993, Reed Consumer Books, ISBN 0-749-71485-9)
- Necklace of Skulls (1993, Reed Consumer Books, ISBN 0-749-71487-5)
- Heart of Ice (1994, Reed Consumer Books, ISBN 0-749-71674-6)
- Twist of Fate (1994, Reed Consumer Books, ISBN 0-749-71675-4)

=== Vulcanverse series ===
- The Hammer of the Sun (2021, Fabled Lands Publishing, ISBN 978-1909905382)
- The Pillars of the Sky (2021, Fabled Lands Publishing, ISBN 978-1909905405)
- Workshop of the Gods (2024, Fabled Lands Publishing, ISBN 978-1909905412)

=== Other works ===
- Game Architecture and Design (with Andrew Rollings, 2003, Pearson Education, ISBN 0-735-71363-4)
- Game Guru: Role-Playing Games (with Leo Hartas, 2004, ILEX Press, ISBN 1-904-70544-8)
- Game Guru: Strategy Games (with Leo Hartas, 2004, ILEX Press, ISBN 1-904-70545-6)
- Machinima : Making Animated Movies in 3D Virtual Environments (with Dave Lloyd and Matt Kelland, 2005, ILEX Press, ISBN 1-904-70564-2 )
- A Minotaur at the Savoy (2011, Mirus Entertainment, ISBN 978-0-956-67789-1)
- Mirabilis: Year of Wonders, Volume One (2011, Printmedia Productions, ISBN 978-0-956-71211-0 )
- Frankenstein (2012, Profile Books, ISBN 978-1-847-65831-9)
- Can You Brexit? Without Breaking Britain (with Jamie Thomson, 2018, ISBN 978-1909905917)
