= Titan (Fighting Fantasy book) =

- Cover of Titan: The Fighting Fantasy World (1986); Art by Christos Achilleos
- Authors: Marc Gascoigne; Steve Jackson; Ian Livingstone
- Genre: Adventure Gamebook
- Publisher: Puffin
- Pages: 128 (1986 edition) & 302 (1989 edition)
- ISBN: 0-14-032127-6 (1985 edition) & 0-14-034132-3 (1989 edition)
- OCLC: 17230613

Titan: The Fighting Fantasy World is a book in the Fighting Fantasy series of children's role-playing gamebooks, first published by Puffin Books in 1986. Although credited to Steve Jackson and Ian Livingstone, it was actually written by Marc Gascoigne (credited as editor), although mostly based on locations, characters and events already described in other books in the series (including Jackson's and Livingstone's). It is written in the manner of an encyclopedia about the fantasy world of Titan, in which the majority of Fighting Fantasy gamebooks are set.

== Summary ==
The book was first published in size 21 by 30 centimetres, with colour illustrations inside the covers. A smaller edition (with more pages) was published in 1989 without the colour illustrations. There was a new edition as an e-book by Arion Games in 2011.

The cover was by Chris Achilleos, and is still available to buy as a poster. The black-and-white internal illustrations and maps are by John Blanche (who also contributed one of the internal colour illustrations), Paul Bonner, Leo Hartas, Bob Harvey, Bill Houston, Alan Langford, Steve Luxton, Iain McCaig, Russ Nicholson, Wil Rees, John Sibbick, and Gary Ward.

After a foreword by Jackson and Livingstone, the rest of the book deals with the following topics:

- The three continents of the fictional world of Titan
- Astronomy (the stars visible from Titan)
- History and legend
- Gods, demons and hell
- The various humanoid species who live there (such as elves, dwarves, snake people, lizard men)
- Notable individuals (good, evil and neutral)
- Underwater kingdoms
- Titan's calendars
- Money and trade
- A description of life on Titan

=== Geography ===
The fictional world of Titan is the setting for the majority of the Fighting Fantasy titles. There are three main continents: Allansia, Khul and The Old World, and other remote locations such as the Isles of the Dawn and Arrowhead Islands.

Allansia is apparently the largest continent and the setting for many of the earliest Fighting Fantasy titles. The first Fighting Fantasy gamebook, The Warlock of Firetop Mountain, was set in the titular mountain in Allansia. In the far north of the continent are the desolate Icefinger Mountains (the location for the book Caverns of the Snow Witch) South of these mountains is the city-state of Fang, (location for the book Deathtrap Dungeon). Further south are the Pagan Plains, which stretch from the lawless city-state of Port Blacksand in the west ( location of City of Thieves) to the monster-haunted Darkwood Forest, to the prosperous city of Salamonis. To the east lie the desolate plains of the Flatlands. In the northeast of the continent is Sardath, a city built on stilts over a lake. Further east is Frostholm, a kingdom inhabited by Dwarfs. South of Port Blacksand lies the Desert of Skulls, home to the lost city of Vatos. Further south lies the region of Arantis. The capital of Arantis is the city of Kaynlesh-Ma, a centre of learning which sits on the River Eltus. Arantis is bordered by two regions that are home to human-hating powers. These are the Snakelands, ruled by a snake-like race, the Caarth; and the Swamplands of Silur Cha, home of the Lizard Men. The Lizard Men in this region are constantly besieging the human city of Vymorna, northwest of Silur Cha. Nearby is the Plain of Bones, home to numerous dinosaurs, and the almost impassable Mountains of Grief. Southwards is Kallamehr, a city of wealthy merchants. The majority of the Fighting Fantasy books are set in Allansia.

West of Allansia lies the "Old World" continent. The Old World is a largely civilized land mass which escaped the cataclysmic wars that devastated the other continents of Titan. It is divided into several kingdoms. The eastern land of Kakhabad is the setting for the Sorcery! series. South of Kakhabad is Analand, a kingdom protected by a Great Wall. Analand's economy is based on mining and forestry; Lake Libra in Analand is regarded as sacred and attracts pilgrims from all over the Old World. North of Kakhabad is the religious nation of Ruddlestone. West of Ruddlestone is the nation of Brice, a autocratic nation regularly at war with its neighbours. South of Brice is Mauristatia, a wild region haunted by vampires and werewolves. In the west of the Old World are the nation-states Femphrey and Gallantaria. Gallantaria is a nation mainly populated by peasants and merchants; its capital, Royal Lendle, is noted as a centre of learning. Gallantaria is bordered by the Northlands, a remote region often at war with Gallantaria. Femphrey is a wealthy kingdom known for agriculture and crystal mining. Femphrey is bordered on the south by the poverty-stricken kingdom of Lendleland.

Khul is a continent to the south of the other two. It is named "the Dark Continent", both due to its remoteness from the other continents and the dark blackish colour of its earth and rocks. Central Khul is dominated by the Wastes of Chaos, a huge internal desert. Founts of raw Chaos magic in the Wastes cause most of the creatures there to mutate horribly. Western Khul is ruled by the Ximoran Protectorate, an alliance of several city-states centered on the city of Ximoran. At the edge of the Protectorate is the "peaceful and prosperous" town of Neuburg, bordering the Cloudhigh Mountains. Southern Khul is dominated by the barren Scythera Desert and the Inland Sea, the latter region being home to numerous pirates. The Inland Sea is bordered by the almost uncrossable Shios’ii Mountains. Over these mountains is the kingdom of Hachiman, ruled by the Shogun. Hachiman is the setting for the gamebook Sword of the Samurai, and is modelled on Feudal Japan.

=== Characters ===
Titan is not a novel, but it describes various characters and their biographies. Many of them are characters who had already appeared in gamebooks (usually the main opponent who has to be defeated at the end of each book), but some were taken from Warlock magazine or were invented by Gascoigne for this book.

Characters encountered in gamebooks who appear in Titan include:

- Zagor (from The Warlock of Firetop Mountain)
- Balthus Dire (from The Citadel of Chaos)
- Yaztromo (from The Forest of Doom)
- Baron Sukumvit (from Deathtrap Dungeon)
- Shareella (from Caverns of the Snow Witch)
- Malbordus (from Temple of Terror)
- The Archmage (from The Crown of Kings)
- Zharradan Marr (from Creature of Havoc)

== Reviews ==
Reviewing Titan in White Dwarf #84, Graeme Davis said that "the contents are impressive", and stated that the book had a "wealth of rich background information". He also said "the whole thing is beautifully produced and lavishly illustrated", and concluded his review by saying Titan was "probably the best value around in fantasy RPG source books".
