= List of Fighting Fantasy gamebooks =

List of single-player fantasy roleplay gamebooks

Fighting Fantasy is a series of single-player fantasy roleplay gamebooks created by Steve Jackson and Ian Livingstone. The first volume in the series was published by Puffin in 1982, with the rights to the franchise eventually being purchased by Wizard Books in 2002. The series distinguished itself by featuring a fantasy role-playing element, with the caption on each cover claiming each title was "a Fighting Fantasy gamebook in which YOU are the hero!" The popularity of the series led to the creation of merchandise such as action figures, board games, role-playing game systems, magazines, novels and video games.

== Fighting Fantasy titles published by Puffin Books (1982-95) ==
=== Main series ===
| No. | Title | Author(s) | Cover Art | Interior Art | Sections | Published | ISBN |
|---|---|---|---|---|---|---|---|
| 1 | The Warlock of Firetop Mountain | Steve Jackson & Ian Livingstone | Peter Andrew Jones | Russ Nicholson | 400 | 1982 | 0-14-031538-1 |
| 2 | The Citadel of Chaos | Steve Jackson | Emmanuel (1st); Ian Miller (2nd) | Russ Nicholson | 400 | 1983 | 0-14-031603-5 |
| 3 | The Forest of Doom | Ian Livingstone | Iain McCaig | Malcolm Barter | 400 | 1983 | 0-14-031604-3 |
| 4 | Starship Traveller | Steve Jackson | Peter Andrew Jones | Peter Andrew Jones | 343 | 1983 | 0-14-031637-X |
| 5 | City of Thieves | Ian Livingstone | Iain McCaig | Iain McCaig | 400 | 1983 | 0-14-031645-0 |
| 6 | Deathtrap Dungeon | Ian Livingstone | Iain McCaig | Iain McCaig | 400 | 1984 | 0-14-031708-2 |
| 7 | Island of the Lizard King | Ian Livingstone | Iain McCaig | Alan Langford | 400 | 1984 | 0-14-031743-0 |
| 8 | Scorpion Swamp | Steve Jackson (USA) | Duncan Smith | Duncan Smith | 400 | 1984 | 0-14-031829-1 |
| 9 | Caverns of the Snow Witch | Ian Livingstone | Les Edwards | Gary Ward & Edward Crosby | 400 | 1984 | 0-14-031830-5 |
| 10 | House of Hell | Steve Jackson | Ian Miller | Tim Sell | 400 | 1984 | 0-14-031831-3 |
| 11 | Talisman of Death | Jamie Thomson & Mark Smith | Peter Andrew Jones | Bob Harvey | 400 | 1984 | 0-14-031859-3 |
| 12 | Space Assassin | Andrew Chapman | Chris Achilleos | Geoffrey Senior | 400 | 1985 | 0-14-031861-5 |
| 13 | Freeway Fighter | Ian Livingstone | Jim Burns | Kevin Bulmer | 380 | 1985 | 0-14-031710-4 |
| 14 | Temple of Terror | Ian Livingstone | Chris Achilleos | Bill Houston | 400 | 1985 | 0-14-031832-1 |
| 15 | The Rings of Kether | Andrew Chapman | Terry Oakes | Nik Spender | 400 | 1985 | 0-14-031860-7 |
| 16 | Seas of Blood | Andrew Chapman | Rodney Matthews | Bob Harvey | 400 | 1985 | 0-14-031951-4 |
| 17 | Appointment with F.E.A.R. | Steve Jackson | Brian Bolland | Declan Considine | 440 | 1985 | 0-14-031922-0 |
| 18 | Rebel Planet | Robin Waterfield | Alan Craddock | Gary Mayes | 400 | 1985 | 0-14-031952-2 |
| 19 | Demons of the Deep | Steve Jackson (USA) | Les Edwards | Bob Harvey | 400 | 1986 | 0-14-031921-2 |
| 20 | Sword of the Samurai | Mark Smith & Jamie Thomson | Peter Andrew Jones | Alan Langford | 400 | 1986 | 0-14-032087-3 |
| 21 | Trial of Champions | Ian Livingstone | Brian Williams | Brian Williams | 400 | 1986 | 0-14-032039-3 |
| 22 | Robot Commando | Steve Jackson (USA) | David Martin | Gary Mayes | 400 | 1986 | 0-14-032152-7 |
| 23 | Masks of Mayhem | Robin Waterfield | John Sibbick | Russ Nicholson | 400 | 1986 | 0-14-032154-3 |
| 24 | Creature of Havoc | Steve Jackson | Ian Miller | Alan Langford | 460 | 1986 | 0-14-032040-7 |
| 25 | Beneath Nightmare Castle | Peter Darvill-Evans | Terry Oakes | Dave Carson | 400 | 1987 | 0-14-032238-8 |
| 26 | Crypt of the Sorcerer | Ian Livingstone | Les Edwards | John Sibbick | 400 | 1987 | 0-14-032155-1 |
| 27 | Star Strider | Luke Sharp | Alan Craddock | Gary Mayes | 400 | 1987 | 0-14-032265-5 |
| 28 | Phantoms of Fear | Robin Waterfield | Ian Miller | Ian Miller | 400 | 1987 | 0-14-032411-9 |
| 29 | Midnight Rogue | Graeme Davis | John Sibbick | John Sibbick | 400 | 1987 | 0-14-032378-3 |
| 30 | Chasms of Malice | Luke Sharp | Les Edwards | Russ Nicholson | 400 | 1988 | 0-14-032475-5 |
| 31 | Battleblade Warrior | Marc Gascoigne | David Gallagher | Alan Langford | 400 | 1988 | 0-14-032412-7 |
| 32 | Slaves of the Abyss | Paul Mason & Steve Williams | Terry Oakes | Bob Harvey | 400 | 1988 | 0-14-032548-4 |
| 33 | Sky Lord | Martin Allen | Les Edwards | Tim Sell | 400 | 1988 | 0-14-032601-4 |
| 34 | Stealer of Souls | Keith Martin (pen name of Carl Sargent) | David Gallagher | Russ Nicholson | 400 | 1988 | 0-14-032658-8 |
| 35 | Daggers of Darkness | Luke Sharp | Les Edwards | Martin McKenna | 400 | 1988 | 0-14-032675-8 |
| 36 | Armies of Death | Ian Livingstone | Chris Achilleos | Nik Williams | 400 | 1988 | 0-14-032486-0 |
| 37 | Portal of Evil | Peter Darvill-Evans | David Gallagher | Alan Langford | 400 | 1989 | 0-14-032839-4 |
| 38 | Vault of the Vampire | Keith Martin | Les Edwards | Martin McKenna | 400 | 1989 | 0-14-032877-7 |
| 39 | Fangs of Fury | Luke Sharp | David Gallagher | David Gallagher | 400 | 1989 | 0-14-032935-8 |
| 40 | Dead of Night | Jim Bambra & Stephen Hand | Terry Oakes | Martin McKenna | 400 | 1989 | 0-14-034456-X |
| 41 | Master of Chaos | Keith Martin | Les Edwards | David Gallagher | 400 | 1990 | 0-14-034010-6 |
| 42 | Black Vein Prophecy | Paul Mason & Steven Williams | Terry Oakes | Terry Oakes | 400 | 1990 | 0-14-034057-2 |
| 43 | The Keep of the Lich Lord | Dave Morris & Jamie Thomson | David Gallagher | David Gallagher | 400 | 1990 | 0-14-034137-4 |
| 44 | Legend of the Shadow Warriors | Stephen Hand | Terry Oakes | Martin McKenna | 400 | 1991 | 0-14-034272-9 |
| 45 | Spectral Stalkers | Peter Darvill-Evans | Ian Miller | Tony Hough | 400 | 1991 | 0-14-034366-0 |
| 46 | Tower of Destruction | Keith Martin | Terry Oakes | Pete Knifton | 400 | 1991 | 0-14-034485-3 |
| 47 | The Crimson Tide | Paul Mason | Alan Craddock | Terry Oakes | 400 | 1992 | 0-14-034555-8 |
| 48 | Moonrunner | Stephen Hand | Terry Oakes | Martin McKenna | 400 | 1992 | 0-14-034937-5 |
| 49 | Siege of Sardath | Keith P. Phillips | Les Edwards | Pete Knifton | 400 | 1992 | 0-14-034947-2 |
| 50 | Return to Firetop Mountain | Ian Livingstone | Les Edwards | Martin McKenna | 400 | 1992 | 0-14-036008-5 |
| 51 | Island of the Undead | Keith Martin | Terry Oakes | Russ Nicholson | 400 | 1992 | 0-14-036257-6 |
| 52 | Night Dragon | Keith Martin | Tony Hough | Tony Hough | 400 | 1993 | 0-14-036407-2 |
| 53 | Spellbreaker | Jonathan Green | Alan Langford | Alan Langford | 400 | 1993 | 0-14-036427-7 |
| 54 | Legend of Zagor | Keith Martin (credited to Ian Livingstone) | Jim Burns & Martin McKenna | Martin McKenna | 400 | 1993 | 0-14-036566-4 |
| 55 | Deathmoor | Robin Waterfield | Terry Oakes | Russ Nicholson | 400 | 1994 | 0-14-036496-X |
| 56 | Knights of Doom | Jonathan Green | Tony Hough | Tony Hough | 400 | 1994 | 0-14-036978-3 |
| 57 | Magehunter | Paul Mason | Ian Miller | Russ Nicholson | 400 | 1995 | 0-14-037013-7 |
| 58 | Revenge of the Vampire | Keith Martin | Les Edwards | Martin McKenna | 400 | 1995 | 0-14-037245-8 |
| 59 | Curse of the Mummy | Jonathan Green | Martin McKenna | Martin McKenna | 400 | 1995 | 0-14-037553-8 |

=== Steve Jackson's Sorcery! ===
| No. | Title | Author(s) | Cover Art | Interior Art | Sections | Published | ISBN |
|---|---|---|---|---|---|---|---|
| | The Sorcery! Spell Book | Steve Jackson | Maggie Kneen | John Blanche | Not applicable | 1983 | 0-14-006793-0 |
| 1 | The Shamutanti Hills | Steve Jackson | John Blanche | John Blanche | 456 | 1983 | 0-14-006794-9 |
| 2 | Kharé - Cityport of Traps | Steve Jackson | John Blanche | John Blanche | 511 | 1984 | 0-14-006801-5 |
| 3 | The Seven Serpents | Steve Jackson | John Blanche | John Blanche | 498 | 1984 | 0-14-031809-7 |
| 4 | The Crown of Kings | Steve Jackson | John Blanche | John Blanche | 800 | 1985 | 0-14-031810-0 |

=== The Adventures of Goldhawk ===
| No. | Title | Author | Cover Art | Interior Art | Sections | Published | ISBN |
|---|---|---|---|---|---|---|---|
| 1 | Darkmoon's Curse | Ian Livingstone | Simon Dewey | Russ Nicholson | 83 | 1995 | 0-14-036939-2 |
| 2 | The Demon Spider | Ian Livingstone | Simon Dewey | Russ Nicholson | 73 | 1995 | 0-14-036940-6 |
| 3 | Mudworm Swamp | Ian Livingstone | Simon Dewey | Russ Nicholson | 94 | 1995 | 0-14-037069-2 |
| 4 | Ghost Road | Ian Livingstone | Simon Dewey | Russ Nicholson | 101 | 1995 | 0-14-037070-6 |

=== Fighting Fantasy novels ===
| Title | Author(s) | Cover Art | Interior Art | Published | ISBN |
|---|---|---|---|---|---|
| The Trolltooth Wars | Steve Jackson | Chris Achilleos | Russ Nicholson | 1989 | 0-14-032482-8 |
| Demonstealer | Marc Gascoigne | Terry Oakes | Russ Nicholson | 1991 | 0-14-034395-4 |
| Shadowmaster | Ian Livingstone & Marc Gascoigne | John Sibbick | Russ Nicholson | 1992 | 0-14-032481-X |
| Zagor Chronicles: Firestorm | Carl Sargent (credited to Ian Livingstone) | Iain McCaig | None | 1993 | 0-14-036864-7 |
| Zagor Chronicles: Darkthrone | Carl Sargent (credited to Ian Livingstone) | Iain McCaig | None | 1993 | 0-14-036865-5 |
| Zagor Chronicles: Skullcrag | Carl Sargent (credited to Ian Livingstone) | Iain McCaig | None | 1994 | 0-14-036866-3 |
| Zagor Chronicles: Demonlord | Carl Sargent (credited to Ian Livingstone) | Iain McCaig | None | 1994 | 0-14-036867-1 |

=== Fighting Fantasy roleplaying gamebooks ===
See also Advanced Fighting Fantasy.

| Title | Author(s) | Cover Art | Interior Art | Published | ISBN |
|---|---|---|---|---|---|
| Fighting Fantasy - The Introductory; Role-playing Game | Steve Jackson | Duncan Smith | Duncan Smith | 1984 | 0-14-031709-0 |
| The Riddling Reaver | Paul Mason & Steve Williams (Edited by Steve Jackson) | Peter Andrew Jones | Brian Williams & Leo Hartas | 1986 | 0-14-032156-X |
| Out of the Pit | Steve Jackson & Ian Livingstone (Edited by Marc Gascoigne) | Christos Achilleos | Various | 1985; 1989 | 0-14-031999-9; 0-14-034131-5 |
| Titan - The Fighting Fantasy World | Steve Jackson & Ian Livingstone (Edited by Marc Gascoigne) | Christos Achilleos | Various | 1986; 1989 | 0-14-032127-6; 0-14-034132-3 |
| Dungeoneer | Marc Gascoigne & Pete Tamlyn | John Sibbick | John Sibbick | 1989 | 0-14-032936-6 |
| Blacksand! | Marc Gascoigne & Pete Tamlyn | John Sibbick | Russ Nicholson | 1990 | 0-14-034396-2 |
| Allansia | Marc Gascoigne & Pete Tamlyn | John Sibbick | Russ Nicholson | 1994 | 0-14-036051-4 |

=== Two-player Fighting Fantasy ===
| Title | Author(s) | Cover Art | Interior Art | Sections | Published | ISBN |
|---|---|---|---|---|---|---|
| Clash of the Princes: The Warrior's Way | Andrew Chapman & Martin Allen | John Blanche | John Blanche | 500 | 1986 | 0-14-032196-9 |
| Clash of the Princes: The Warlock's Way | Andrew Chapman & Martin Allen | John Blanche | John Blanche | 500 | 1986 | 0-14-032197-7 |

=== Miscellaneous Fighting Fantasy titles ===
| Title | Author(s) | Cover Art | Interior Art | Published | ISBN |
|---|---|---|---|---|---|
| Warlock (magazine) | Various | Various | Various | 1983-1986 | N/A |
| The Tasks of Tantalon | Steve Jackson | Steven Lavis | Steven Lavis | 1985 | 0-19-279792-1 |
| Casket of Souls | Ian Livingstone | Iain McCaig | Iain McCaig | 1987 | 0-19-279791-3 |
| The Fighting Fantasy Poster Book | Steve Jackson & Ian Livingstone | Christos Achilleos | Various | 1990 | 0-14-090220-1 |
| The Fighting Fantasy 10th Anniversary Yearbook | Marc Gascoigne | Terry Oakes | Various | 1992 | 0-14-036290-8 |

== Fighting Fantasy titles published by Wizard Books ==
=== Main series 1 (2002–2007) ===
| No. | Title | Author(s) | Cover Art | Interior Art | Sections | Published | ISBN |
|---|---|---|---|---|---|---|---|
| 1 | The Warlock of Firetop Mountain | Steve Jackson & Ian Livingstone | Martin McKenna | Russ Nicholson | 400 | 2002 | 1-84046-387-2 |
| 2 | The Citadel of Chaos | Steve Jackson | Kevin Jenkins | Russ Nicholson | 400 | 2002 | 1-84046-389-9 |
| 3 | Deathtrap Dungeon | Ian Livingstone | Mel Grant | Iain McCaig | 400 | 2002 | 1-84046-388-0 |
| 4 | Creature of Havoc | Steve Jackson | Les Edwards | Alan Langford | 460 | 2002 | 1-84046-391-0 |
| 5 | City of Thieves | Ian Livingstone | Martin McKenna | Iain McCaig | 400 | 2002 | 1-84046-397-X |
| 6 | Crypt of the Sorcerer | Ian Livingstone | Les Edwards | John Sibbick | 400 | 2002 | 1-84046-396-1 |
| 7 | House of Hell | Steve Jackson | Nicholas Halliday | Tim Sell | 400 | 2002 | 1-84046-417-8 |
| 8 | The Forest of Doom | Ian Livingstone | Martin McKenna | Malcolm Barter | 400 | 2003 | 1-84046-429-1 |
| 9 | Sorcery! The Shamutanti Hills | Steve Jackson | Mel Grant | John Blanche | 456 | 2003 | 1-84046-430-5 |
| 10 | Caverns of the Snow Witch | Ian Livingstone | Les Edwards | Gary Ward & Edward Crosby | 400 | 2003 | 1-84046-432-1 |
| 11 | Sorcery! Kharé - Cityport of Traps | Steve Jackson | Mel Grant | John Blanche | 511 | 2003 | 1-84046-433-X |
| 12 | Trial of Champions | Ian Livingstone | Martin McKenna | Brian Williams | 400 | 2003 | 1-84046-434-8 |
| 13 | Sorcery! The Seven Serpents | Steve Jackson | Mel Grant | John Blanche | 498 | 2003 | 1-84046-435-6 |
| 14 | Armies of Death | Ian Livingstone | Martin McKenna | Nik Williams | 400 | 2003 | 1-84046-436-4 |
| 15 | Sorcery! The Crown of Kings | Steve Jackson | Mel Grant | John Blanche | 800 | 2003 | 1-84046-438-0 |
| 16 | Return to Firetop Mountain | Ian Livingstone | Martin McKenna | Martin McKenna | 400 | 2003 | 1-84046-481-X |
| 17 | Island of the Lizard King | Ian Livingstone | Martin McKenna | Alan Langford | 400 | 2003 | 1-84046-491-7 |
| 18 | Appointment with F.E.A.R. | Steve Jackson | Brian Bolland | Declan Considine | 440 | 2004 | 1-84046-527-1 |
| 19 | Temple of Terror | Ian Livingstone | Martin McKenna | Bill Houston | 400 | 2004 | 1-84046-528-X |
| 20 | Legend of Zagor | Keith Martin (credited to Ian Livingstone) | Martin McKenna | Martin McKenna | 400 | 2004 | 1-84046-551-4 |
| 21 | Eye of the Dragon* | Ian Livingstone | Martin McKenna | Martin McKenna | 407 | 2005 | 1-84046-642-1 |
| 22 | Starship Traveller | Steve Jackson | Chris Moore | Peter Andrew Jones | 343 | 2005 | 1-84046-552-2 |
| 23 | Freeway Fighter | Ian Livingstone | Jim Burns | Kevin Bulmer | 380 | 2005 | 1-84046-565-4 |
| 24 | Talisman of Death | Jamie Thomson & Mark Smith | Martin McKenna | Bob Harvey | 400 | 2006 | 1-84046-566-2 |
| 25 | Sword of the Samurai | Mark Smith & Jamie Thomson | Mel Grant | Alan Langford | 400 | 2006 | 1-84046-732-0 |
| 26 | Bloodbones* | Jonathan Green | Martin McKenna | Tony Hough | 400 | 2006 | 1-84046-765-7 |
| 27 | Curse of the Mummy | Jonathan Green | Martin McKenna | Martin McKenna | 400 | 2007 | 1-84046-802-5 |
| 28 | Spellbreaker | Jonathan Green | Martin McKenna | Alan Langford | 400 | 2007 | 1-84046-807-6 |
| 29 | Howl of the Werewolf* | Jonathan Green | Martin McKenna | Martin McKenna | 515 | 2007 | 1-84046-838-6 |
| N/A | The Warlock of Firetop Mountain; 25th Anniversary Edition | Steve Jackson & Ian Livingstone | Peter Andrew Jones | Russ Nicholson | 400 | 2007 | 1-84046-837-8 |

*Original stories (not reprints).

=== Main series 2 (2009–2012) ===
| No. | Title | Author(s) | Cover Art | Interior Art | Sections | Published | ISBN |
|---|---|---|---|---|---|---|---|
| 1 | The Warlock of Firetop Mountain | Steve Jackson & Ian Livingstone | Martin McKenna | Russ Nicholson | 400 | 2009 | 978-1-848310-75-9 |
| 2 | The Citadel of Chaos | Steve Jackson | Kevin Jenkins | Russ Nicholson | 400 | 2009 | 978-1-848310-76-6 |
| 3 | Deathtrap Dungeon | Ian Livingstone | Mel Grant | Iain McCaig | 400 | 2009 | 978-1-848310-77-3 |
| 4 | Stormslayer* | Jonathan Green | Stephen Player | Stephen Player | 400 | 2009 | 978-1-848310-78-0 |
| 5 | Creature of Havoc | Steve Jackson | Les Edwards | Alan Langford | 460 | 2010 | 978-1-848311-12-1 |
| 6 | City of Thieves | Ian Livingstone | Martin McKenna | Iain McCaig | 400 | 2010 | 978-1-848311-13-8 |
| 7 | Bloodbones | Jonathan Green | Martin McKenna | Tony Hough | 400 | 2010 | 978-1-848311-19-0 |
| 8 | Night of the Necromancer* | Jonathan Green | Martin McKenna | Martin McKenna | 450 | 2010 | 978-1-848311-18-3 |
| 9 | House of Hell | Steve Jackson | Nicholas Halliday | Tim Sell | 400 | 2010 | 978-1-848311-22-0 |
| 10 | Eye of the Dragon | Ian Livingstone | Martin McKenna | Martin McKenna | 407 | 2010 | 978-1-848311-23-7 |
| 11 | Howl of the Werewolf | Jonathan Green | Martin McKenna | Martin McKenna | 515 | 2010 | 978-1-848311-94-7 |
| 12 | Trial of Champions | Ian Livingstone | Martin McKenna | Brian Williams | 400 | 2010 | 978-1-848311-93-0 |
| 13 | The Forest of Doom | Ian Livingstone | Martin McKenna | Malcolm Barter | 400 | 2011 | 978-1-848312-21-0 |
| 14 | Curse of the Mummy | Jonathan Green | Martin McKenna | Martin McKenna | 400 | 2011 | 978-1-848312-43-2 |
| 15 | Armies of Death | Ian Livingstone | Martin McKenna | Nik Williams | 400 | 2011 | 978-1-848312-34-0 |
| 16 | Appointment with F.E.A.R. | Steve Jackson | Brian Bolland | Declan Considine | 440 | 2011 | 978-1-848312-44-9 |
| N/A | Blood of the Zombies* | Ian Livingstone | Greg Staples | Kevin Crossley | 400 | 2012 | 978-1-848314-05-4 |

*Original stories (not reprints).

== Fighting Fantasy titles published by Snowbooks ==
=== Fighting Fantasy history ===
| Title | Author(s) | Cover Art | Interior Art | Published | ISBN |
|---|---|---|---|---|---|
| YOU Are The Hero: A History of Fighting Fantasy Gamebooks | Jonathan Green | Martin McKenna | Various | 2014 | 978-1-909679-38-2 Hardback; 978-1-909679-36-8 Paperback |
| YOU Are The Hero Part 2: A History of Fighting Fantasy Gamebooks | Jonathan Green | Chris Achilleos | Various | 2017 | 978-1-911390-44-2 Hardback; 978-1-911390-45-9 Paperback |
| YOU Are The Hero: 40th Anniversary Edition; A History of Fighting Fantasy Gamebooks | Jonathan Green | Iain McCaig | Various | 2023 | 978-1-913525-24-8 Deluxe Hardback; 978-1-913525-24-8 Hardback; 978-1-913525-25-5 Paperback |

=== Fighting Fantasy colouring books ===
| Title | Author(s) | Cover Art | Interior Art | Published | ISBN |
|---|---|---|---|---|---|
| Official Fighting Fantasy Colouring Book 1: The Warlock of Firetop Mountain | Steve Jackson & Ian Livingstone | Peter Andrew Jones | Russ Nicholson | 2016 | 978-1-911390-04-6 Hardback; 978-1-911390-03-9 Paperback |
| Official Fighting Fantasy Colouring Book 2: The Forest of Doom | Ian Livingstone | Iain McCaig | Malcolm Barter | 2016 | 978-1-911390-06-0 Hardback; 978-1-911390-05-3 Paperback |
| Official Fighting Fantasy Colouring Book 3: Deathtrap Dungeon | Ian Livingstone | Iain McCaig | Ian McCaig | 2016 | 978-1-911390-10-7 Hardback; 978-1-911390-09-1 Paperback |
| Official Fighting Fantasy Colouring Book 4: City of Thieves | Ian Livingstone | Iain McCaig | Iain McCaig | 2016 | 978-1-911390-08-4 Hardback; 978-1-911390-07-7 Paperback |

== Fighting Fantasy titles published by Scholastic ==
=== Main series (2017–present) ===
| No. | Title | Author(s) | Cover Art | Interior Art | Sections | Published | ISBN |
|---|---|---|---|---|---|---|---|
| 1 | The Warlock of Firetop Mountain | Steve Jackson & Ian Livingstone | Robert Ball | Vlado Krizan | 400 | 2017 | 978-0702344404 Hardback+ 978-1407181301 Paperback |
| 2 | City of Thieves | Ian Livingstone | Robert Ball | Vlado Krizan | 400 | 2017 | 978-0702350733 Hardback; 978-1407181264 Paperback |
| 3 | The Citadel of Chaos | Steve Jackson | Robert Ball | Vlado Krizan | 400 | 2017 | 978-1407181257 |
| 4 | The Forest of Doom | Ian Livingstone | Robert Ball | Vlado Krizan | 400 | 2017 | 978-1407181288 |
| 5 | House of Hell | Steve Jackson | Robert Ball | Vlado Krizan | 400 | 2017 | 978-1407182001 |
| 6 | The Port of Peril* | Ian Livingstone | Iain McCaig (Hardback); Robert Ball (Paperback) | Vlado Krizan | 400 | 2017 | 978-1407184296 Hardback; 978-1407181295 Paperback |
| 7 | Creature of Havoc | Steve Jackson | Robert Ball | Vlado Krizan | 460 | 2018 | 978-1407186184 |
| 8 | Deathtrap Dungeon | Ian Livingstone | Robert Ball | Vlado Krizan | 400 | 2018 | 978-1407181271 |
| 9 | Appointment with F.E.A.R. | Steve Jackson | Robert Ball | Vlado Krizan | 440 | 2018 | 978-1407186177 |
| 10 | Island of the Lizard King | Ian Livingstone | Robert Ball | Vlado Krizan | 400 | 2018 | 978-1407186207 |
| 11 | Sorcery! The Shamutanti Hills | Steve Jackson | Robert Ball | Vlado Krizan | 456 | 2018 | 978-1407186214 |
| 12 | The Gates of Death* | Charlie Higson | Robert Ball | Vlado Krizan | 470 | 2018 | 978-1407186306 |
| 13 | Caverns of the Snow Witch | Ian Livingstone | Robert Ball | Robert Ball | 400 | 2019 | 978-1407188478 |
| 14 | Sorcery! Kharé - Cityport of Traps | Steve Jackson | Robert Ball | Robert Ball | 511 | 2019 | 978-1407188485 |
| 15 | Assassins of Allansia* | Ian Livingstone | Karl Kopinski (Hardback); Robert Ball (Paperback) | Robert Ball | 400 | 2019 | 978-1407198330 Hardback; 978-1407196831 Paperback |
| 16 | Return to Firetop Mountain | Ian Livingstone | Robert Ball | Martin McKenna | 400 | 2020 | 978-0702305719 |
| 17 | Crystal of Storms* | Rhianna Pratchett | Eva Eskelinen | Eva Eskelinen | 400 | 2020 | 978-1407199689 |
| 18 | Sorcery! The Seven Serpents | Steve Jackson | Robert Ball | John Blanche | 498 | 2022 | 978-0702314193 |
| 19 | Sorcery! The Crown of Kings | Steve Jackson | Robert Ball | John Blanche | 800 | 2022 | 978-0702314292 |
| 20 | Secrets of Salamonis* | Steve Jackson (with Jonathan Green) | Tazio Bettin | Tazio Bettin | 480 | 2022 | 978-1407188492 |
| 21 | Shadow of the Giants* | Ian Livingstone | Mike McCarthy | Mike McCarthy | 400 | 2022 | 978-0702324390 Hardback; 978-0702323096 Paperback |
| 22 | The Dungeon on Blood Island* | Ian Livingstone | Iain McCaig | Krisztián Balla | 400 | 2024 | 978-0702338595 Hardback; 978-0702338601 Paperback |
| 23 | Tomb of the Golden Skull* | Ian Livingstone | Karl Kopinski | Karl Kopinski | 400 | 2026 | 978-0702350740 Hardback; 978-0702350757 Paperback |

*Original stories (not reprints).

+ A hardback limited edition of The Warlock of Firetop Mountain was published in September 2025, with a new cover by Karl Kopinski, a colour map by Leo Hartas, and a history of the FF franchise.

== Fighting Fantasy titles published by Steve Jackson Games ==
Steve Jackson Games is a company based in Austin, Texas, founded by Steve Jackson (USA). In 2024 it was announced that it would be publishing FF gamebooks in the United States, starting with ten in 2025. The first five are available as of July 2026.

=== Main Series (tbc) ===
| No. | Title | Author(s) | Cover Art | Interior Art | Sections | Published | ISBN |
|---|---|---|---|---|---|---|---|
| 1 | The Warlock of Firetop Mountain | Steve Jackson & Ian Livingstone | | | | tbc | |
| 2 | Deathtrap Dungeon | Ian Livingstone | | | | tbc | |
| 3 | City of Thieves | Ian Livingstone | | | | tbc | |
| 4 | The Citadel of Chaos | Steve Jackson | | | | tbc | |
| 5 | The Forest of Doom | Ian Livingstone | | | | tbc | |
| 6 | Island of the Lizard King | Ian Livingstone | | | | tbc | |
| 7 | Scorpion Swamp | Steve Jackson (USA) | | | | tbc | |
| 8 | Caverns of the Snow Witch | Ian Livingstone | | | | tbc | |
| 9 | House of Hell | Steve Jackson | | | | tbc | |
| 10 | Creature of Havoc | Steve Jackson | | | | tbc | |
| 11 | Crypt of the Sorcerer | Ian Livingstone | | | | tbc | |
| 12 | The Dungeon on Blood Island | Ian Livingstone | | | | tbc | |
| 13 | Trial of Champions | Ian Livingstone | | | | tbc | |
| 14 | Assassins of Allansia | Ian Livingstone | | | | tbc | |
| 15 | Shadow of the Giants | Ian Livingstone | | | | tbc | |

== Fighting Fantasy title published by Unbound ==
- Magic Realms: The Art of Fighting Fantasy (2024)
  - Written by Ian Livingstone and Jonathan Green, front cover art by Martin McKenna.

== Other media ==
=== Boardgames ===
| Title | Publisher | Designer | Artist | Published |
|---|---|---|---|---|
| The Warlock of Firetop Mountain | Games Workshop | Steve Jackson | Peter Andrew Jones (box), Dave Andrews | 1986 |
| Legend of Zagor | Parker Bros. & Hasbro | Ian Livingstone | Jim Burns (box), Martin McKenna | 1993 |

=== Electronic gamebooks and computer games ===
Some gamebooks were released as home computer games or as applications for smartphones.

== See also ==
- Warlock (magazine)
