= Space Assassin =

- Cover of the first edition
- Author: Andrew Chapman
- Illustrator: Geoffrey Senior
- Cover artist: Christos Achilleos; U.S. cover: R. Courtney
- Series: Fighting Fantasy: Puffin number: 12
- Genre: Science fiction
- Published: Puffin: 1985; Dell/Laurel-Leaf: 1985
- Media type: Print (Paperback)
- ISBN: 0-14-031861-5

Space Assassin is a single-player roleplaying gamebook written by Andrew Chapman, illustrated by Geoffrey Senior and originally published in 1985 by Puffin Books. It forms part of Steve Jackson and Ian Livingstone's Fighting Fantasy series. It is the 12th in the series in the original Puffin series (ISBN 0-14-031861-5). There are currently no announced plans to republish the book as part of the modern Wizard series.

== Story ==
Space Assassin is a science-fiction scenario in which the player is an assassin who must fight his way through waves of mutant cyborgs on an orbiting spaceship as a mad scientist prepares to mutate all life on the planet below.

Space Assassin is the second Fighting Fantasy book in the science fiction genre, the first being Starship Traveller. The book places the player on the starship Vandervecken, where a crazed scientist named Cyrus plans to unleash a hideous experiment upon the player's homeworld.

The player must pass through the labyrinthine Vandervecken, overcoming robots, mutants, and other dangerous foes until they finally confront the scientist. If the player defeats him, the planet will be saved, and the game will end successfully.
