= Emmanuel (artist) =

Emmanuel is the name used by artist Emmanuel Papadopoulos (c. 1946-June 2026), best known for illustrating fantasy role-playing games in the 1980s.

== Career ==
Emmanuel's works have included covers and illustrations for early issues of White Dwarf magazine, as well as illustrations for Imagine. Emmanuel also supplied the cover and several interior illustrations for the original Fiend Folio (1981), and regarding the cover Steve Jackson in 2022 noted that he "commissioned Emmanuel to paint the famous Githyanki cover and I'm still the proud owner of the original painting." Emmanuel also illustrated the cover for the Puffin Books edition of the Fighting Fantasy gamebook The Citadel of Chaos (1983).
