= Temple of Terror =

Single-player role-playing game book by Ian Livingstone

- The original Puffin Books cover (1985)
- Author: Ian Livingstone
- Illustrator: Bill Houston
- Cover artist: Christos Achilleos
- Series: Fighting Fantasy: Puffin number: 14; Wizard number: 19
- Genre: Fantasy
- Published: Puffin: 1985; Dell/Laurel-Leaf: 1986
- Media type: Print (Paperback)
- ISBN: 0-14-031832-1 (Puffin); ISBN 1-84046-528-X (Wizard)

Temple of Terror is a single-player role-playing game-book written by Ian Livingstone, illustrated by Bill Houston and originally published in 1985 by Puffin Books. It was later republished by Wizard Books in 2004. It forms part of Steve Jackson and Ian Livingstone's Fighting Fantasy series. It is the fourteenth in the series in the original Puffin series (ISBN 0-14-031832-1) and 19th in the modern Wizard series (ISBN 1-84046-528-X).

== Rules ==
As with titles such as House of Hell and Appointment with F.E.A.R., Temple of Terror utilizes an additional game mechanic: five letters have been scattered throughout the story, and if the player finds all five letters they spell the word DEATH and the player instantly dies, ending the game.

== Story ==
Temple of Terror is a fantasy scenario.

The reader plays as a wandering adventurer who is recruited by the good wizard Yaztromo (who previously appeared in The Forest of Doom) and tasked with locating the five dragon artefacts (bone, crystal, ebony, gold and silver) which are hidden in the lost city of Vatos. Destroying them is the only means to defeat the dark elf Malbordous and his plans to rule Allansia. Gameplay takes the form of a campaign: the player must determine a means of traveling through the Desert of Skulls, find and scour Vatos for the artefacts whilst overcoming various traps and monsters and finally defeat Malbordus. Successful completion of the quest requires the player from the first paragraphs to acquire items that will assist in future situations.

Temple of Terror has you encountering many of the faces and places of earlier Ian Livingstone books- from Yaztromo the wizard in Darkwood Forest to the “City of Thieves”- Port Blacksand.

== Other media ==
The book was adapted into the video game Temple of Terror.
