= Deathtrap =

Deathtrap may refer to:

== Characters ==
- Deathtrap, a hypothetical organism from Extraterrestrial
- Deathtrap, a character from Stormwatch, leader of a team of mercenaries
- Deathtrap, a robot constructed by a character called Gaige to serve as her personal bodyguard in the fictional Borderlands series of games programmed by Gearbox
- Deathtrap (DC Comics), one of the many fictional alter-egos of villain Carl Draper in DC Comics

== Music ==
- "Death Trap", a song by Hawkwind from their 1979 album PXR5
- "Death Trap", a song by Pantera from their 1988 album Power Metal
- "Death Trap", a song by Gravediggaz from their 1997 album 6 Feet Deep
- Death Trap (musician), an alias of Irish musician Liam McCay/Sign Crushes Motorist

== Video games ==
- The Death Trap, a 1984 video game developed and published by Square for the NEC PC-8801, NEC PC-9801, and Fujitsu FM-7
- Will: The Death Trap II, sequel to the previous game
- Deathtrap (video game), a 2015 video game developed and published by NeocoreGames
- Death Trap, kind of a stage fatality which occurs in Mortal Kombat during the fight

== Plays, film and television ==
- Deathtrap (play), a 1978 play by Ira Levin which received a Tony Award nomination for Best Play
- Deathtrap (film), a 1982 film based on the Levin play
- Death Trap, a 1977 film better known as Eaten Alive
- Deathtrap (plot device), a plot device in fiction and drama
- "Death Trap" (Star Wars: The Clone Wars), a second-season episode of Star Wars: The Clone Wars

== Other ==
- A political neologism used to condemn the budget proposal The Path to Prosperity
- A slang term for a consumer product that does not meet safety regulations and may pose a risk of injury or death
- An animal trap designed to kill
  - see also Mouse trap

== See also ==
- Deathtrap Dungeon, an adventure gamebook by Ian Livingstone
- Deathtrap Dungeon, a 1998 video game
