= Scorpion Swamp =

- The original Puffin Books cover of Scorpion Swamp
- Author: Steve Jackson
- Illustrator: Duncan Smith
- Cover artist: Duncan Smith
- Series: Fighting Fantasy: Puffin number: 8
- Genre: Fantasy
- Published: Puffin (UK): 1984; Dell/Laurel-Leaf (US): 1985
- Media type: Print (Paperback)
- ISBN: 0-14-031829-1

Scorpion Swamp is a single-player adventuring gamebook written by Steve Jackson (the American game designer, as opposed to the series co-creator), illustrated by Duncan Smith, and originally published in 1984 by Puffin Books. It forms part of Steve Jackson and Ian Livingstone's Fighting Fantasy series. It is the 8th in the series in the original Puffin series (ISBN 0-14-031829-1). It was the first Fighting Fantasy book not written by the series' co-creators.

== Story ==
Scorpion Swamp is a fantasy scenario. Having acquired a magical brass ring (which detects evil and always indicates which direction is north) from a mysterious old woman, the player enters the notorious Scorpion Swamp.

Gameplay differed from previous titles in several ways:

- The story allows the player to choose one of three quests: the patrons of said quests being either good (locate a rare plant for the wizard Selator), evil (acquire the amulets of animal/insect avatars for the wizard Grimslade), or neutral (map a trade route for the trader Poomchukker) respectively.
- Gameplay has a non-linear design, allowing "free roaming": the player may explore the swamp at will and return to locations previously visited.
- The game design employed a grid system of locations to explore. Whereas in previous titles choosing an option to follow a point of the compass was nebulous and backtracking almost impossible, in this title each location was equidistant from all others and options only led in the four primary compass directions. On entering a location, the player was asked if they had visited previously, and instructed accordingly. This format was an innovation for Fighting Fantasy.
- The 400th reference does not contain an ending to the adventure.
