= Howl of the Werewolf =

2007 book by Jonathan Green

- FF29 Howl of the Werewolf, 2007 cover
- Author: Jonathan Green
- Illustrator: Martin McKenna
- Cover artist: Martin McKenna
- Series: Fighting Fantasy; Wizard number: 29
- Genre: Fantasy; Location: The Old World, Titan
- Publication date: Wizard: 2007
- Media type: Print (Paperback)
- ISBN: 1-84046-838-6

Howl of the Werewolf is a single-player roleplaying gamebook written by Jonathan Green and illustrated by Martin McKenna. It was published in 2007 by Wizard Books. It forms part of Steve Jackson and Ian Livingstone's Fighting Fantasy series. It is the 29th in the Wizard series. It is the first completely original Fighting Fantasy gamebook published by Wizard (Eye of the Dragon is an extended version of the adventure from Ian Livingstone's earlier book Dicing with Dragons). The book is made up of 515 references rather than the usual 400.

Howl of the Werewolf was voted the best gamebook in the series in a 2011 poll in Fighting Fantazine.

== Story ==
To find the cure for their lycanthropy, the player must travel through oppressed towns to reach Castle Wulfen. On the way they may find several important items that they will use in your final battle against Count Varcolac.

=== Setting ===
The book's setting of Lupravia is another of the principalities of Mauristatia, like Mortvania which featured in the previous Fighting Fantasy book Vault of the Vampire. Lupravia is an exclusive location for this book. It is a highly gothic setting that includes many vampiric monsters such as werewolves.

== Creation ==
Green had conceived the idea of Howl of the Werewolf before the cancellation of the series by Puffin Books. Green came up with the premise, the name of the book, the beginning of the story and the very end, along with a few background details at this earlier time, but came up with the majority of the ideas in the book when he began plotting it in 2006.

In writing the book, Green wanted to create an adventure that drew on the mythology and folklore surrounding werewolves, having found that their previous appearances in Fighting Fantasy took the form of shallow side-encounters. Green has stated that he took the criticisms of his previous work on the official Fighting Fantasy website forums into account when writing Howl of the Werewolf. The procedure for creating a character in Howl of the Werewolf is somewhat different than for previous Fighting Fantasy books.
