= The Rings of Kether =

- Cover of the first edition
- Author: Andrew Chapman
- Illustrator: Nik Spender
- Cover artist: Terry Oakes
- Series: Fighting Fantasy: Puffin number: 15
- Genre: Science fiction Location: Space
- Published: Puffin: 1985; Dell/Laurel-Leaf: 1986
- Media type: Print (Paperback)
- ISBN: 0-14-031860-7 (Puffin)

The Rings of Kether is a single-player roleplaying gamebook written by Andrew Chapman, illustrated by Nik Spender and originally published in 1985 by Puffin Books. It forms part of Steve Jackson and Ian Livingstone's Fighting Fantasy series. It is the 15th in the series in the original Puffin series (ISBN 0-14-031860-7). There are currently no announced plans to republish the book as part of the modern Scholastic Books series.

== Story ==
The Rings of Kether is a science-fiction solo scenario in which a Galactic Federation agent seeks to end the drug rings found in the Kether system.

Unlike most Fighting Fantasy gamebooks, the story takes place in a science fiction setting, with the player taking on the role of a Narcotics Officer seeking to break up a drug ring located on the planet of Kether. Players are given a reasonable degree of freedom as they travel between various locations on the planet's surface and in orbit, and there are multiple paths to the final confrontation with the heads of the crime ring. The major element which distinguishes this gamebook from others in the series is the heavy use of Skill rolls, which are employed several times in quick succession during the course of the book. There are also rules for ship-to-ship combat and, unusually for a Fighting Fantasy book, different rules for unarmed and armed personal combat.

Unlike most Fighting Fantasy gamebooks, The Rings of Kether is unusual in that it has two ways to win the adventure. The player can either destroy the smugglers' base or fight and kill their leader instead, a man named Blaster Babbet, to achieve ultimate victory.
