= Eye of the Dragon =

Roleplaying gamebook by Ian Livingstone

- Cover of the first edition
- Author: Ian Livingstone
- Illustrator: Martin McKenna
- Cover artist: Martin McKenna
- Media type: Print (Paperback)
- ISBN: 1-84046-642-1

Eye of the Dragon is a single-player roleplaying gamebook written by Ian Livingstone, illustrated by Martin McKenna and published in 2005 by Wizard Books. It forms part of Steve Jackson and Ian Livingstone's Fighting Fantasy series. It is the 21st in the Wizard series. Eye of the Dragon was the first new Fighting Fantasy gamebook published by Wizard, although the book is an extended version of the adventure from Ian Livingstone's earlier book Dicing with Dragons rather than a completely original adventure. The book is made up of 407 references rather than the usual 400.

== Story ==
This Fighting Fantasy gamebook is set in the usual fantasy world of Titan, in the Allansia region. The player must claim a solid gold dragon from within a dungeon beneath Darkwood Forest. The book, although a new gamebook published for the first time, by Wizard, was written like an old gamebook's typical dungeon crawl (Deathtrap Dungeon for example).

During the journey the player allies with a character called Littlebig, a relative of a character from a previous Fighting Fantasy gamebook.

The player must collect keys during the journey. These keys will allow the player to open boxes at the final puzzle, which contain a clue. The player must pull five weapons out of the wall in the correct order or be electrocuted and killed. The player must also find the second emerald eye of the dragon or be killed by poison darts while trying to move the golden dragon.

== Gamebook artwork ==
There is a portrait of Ian Livingstone hidden in the interior art of the game book. It depicts an old man in an apron who keeps a storeroom in the picture for book reference number 329. Artist Martin McKenna added the author's face to his artwork for all the game books he illustrated that were written by Livingstone.
