= Caverns of the Snow Witch =

1984 single-player roleplaying gamebook

- The original Puffin Books cover of Caverns of the Snow Witch
- Author: Ian Livingstone
- Illustrators: Gary Ward; Edward Crosby
- Cover artist: Les Edwards (UK); R. Courtney (US)
- Series: Fighting Fantasy: Puffin number: 9; Wizard number: 10
- Genre: Fantasy; Location: Allansia, Titan
- Published: Puffin (UK): 1984; Dell/Laurel-Leaf (US): 1985
- Media type: Print (Paperback)
- ISBN: 0-14-031830-5 (Puffin); ISBN 1-84046-432-1 (Wizard)

Caverns of the Snow Witch is a single-player roleplaying gamebook, written by Ian Livingstone, illustrated by Gary Ward and Edward Crosby and originally published in 1984 by Puffin Books. It was later republished by Wizard Books in 2003. It forms part of Steve Jackson and Ian Livingstone's Fighting Fantasy series. It is the 9th in the series in the original Puffin series (ISBN 0-14-031830-5) and 10th in the modern Wizard series (ISBN 1-84046-432-1).

== Creation ==
The story was first published in Warlock: The Fighting Fantasy Magazine as a shorter 190-section adventure. Livingstone later expanded the plot to create the final story.

== Story ==
Caverns of the Snow Witch is a fantasy adventure scenario in which the character is a guard working in the caravan of a merchant in the frozen land of Allansia, and hunts a dangerous beast.

The story takes the form of a campaign: the player must first locate the correct path to the lair of the Snow Witch, defeat the villain and her minions, and finally after escaping with allies find a means of overcoming a potentially fatal curse.

== Reception ==
RPG.net stated the concept was "substantially better than The Warlock of Firetop Mountain, and certainly more novel than your typical dungeon crawl."

== In other media ==
The gamebook was converted into a 40-page d20 System role-playing adventure by Jamie Wallis. It was published by Myriador in 2003 and reissued in pdf format by Greywood Publishing in 2008.

A digital version was developed by Tin Man Games available for Android and iOS. A PC Steam version was also released.
