= Creature of Havoc =

Role-playing gamebook

- The original Puffin Books cover of Creature of Havoc
- Author: Steve Jackson
- Illustrator: Alan Langford
- Cover artist: Ian Miller
- Series: Fighting Fantasy: Puffin number: 24; Wizard number: 4
- Genre: Fantasy; Location: Allansia, Titan
- Publication date: Puffin: 1986; Wizard: 2002
- Media type: Print (Paperback)
- ISBN: 0-14-032040-7 (Puffin); ISBN 1-84046-391-0 (Wizard)

Creature of Havoc is a single-player roleplaying gamebook written by British game designer Steve Jackson (not to be confused with the US game designer of the same name), illustrated by Alan Langford and originally published in 1986 by Puffin Books. It was later republished by Wizard Books in 2002. It forms part of Jackson and Ian Livingstone's fictional Fighting Fantasy series. It is the 24th in the original Puffin series (ISBN 0-14-032040-7) and 4th in the modern Wizard series (ISBN 1-84046-391-0).

== Gameplay ==
There are two small additions to the rules given the story circumstances: damage to the creature (the player) is reduced by 1 STAMINA point due to its tough hide, while rolling a double on the dice when determining the player's attack strength will instantly kill an enemy.

The player begins the adventure as the "creature of havoc" of the title, an unidentified, violent beast with no concept of who or where they are. Because the creature cannot make its own decisions, it is governed by instinct, and die rolls are initially used to determine which pages to turn to, rather than the player's own choice. This changes once the character finds a particular item early in the game which allows the player to make choices.

== Story ==
The book begins with an extensive background section detailing the recent history of an area of Allansia known as the Trolltooth Pass. A necromancer named Zharradan Marr has been gathering a small army and is particularly feared as a practitioner of marrangha, a type of black magic that involves the transformation of limbs and organs from one creature to another. Three "Vapours" have been stolen from an elven village. These vapours are benevolent spirits which bestow the gifts of reason, languages and elven magic.

The player begins the adventure as the titular "creature of havoc", an unidentified, violent beast with no concept of who or where they are. The creature gradually recovers the ability to reason and communicate and must learn what has happened and why.

Because the creature cannot make its own decisions, it is governed by instinct. Once it finds the Vapour of Reason, it is able to make choices. The creature proceeds through the dungeon, killing a number of adventurers before finding the Vapour of Languages, which allows the creature to understand what others are saying. The creature escapes from the dungeon, killing Darramouss, one of Marr's allies, in the process.

The creature then elects to help a group of witches by collecting a particular root. Whilst doing this, it saves the life of a Half-Orc named Grog, who eventually returns the favour by saving the creature, at the expense of his own life. The creature picks up the bag that Grog was carrying and finds a box similar to the one which the Vapours of Reason and Language were encased in.

As a reward for retrieving the root, the witches lead the creature to an elf, the original thief of the Vapours, whom the creature can extort for information on how to access the Galleykeep, Marr's flying vessel. Aboard the Galleykeep Marr reveals the creature's identity and demands that he surrender Grog's box, which contains the Vapour of Elven Magic. If the creature is able to defeat Marr by destroying his portal, the necromancer is banished from the world of the living and the creature reverts into their previous human self, returning to his position as commander of the Galleykeep. If the creature fails, Marr takes the vapour by force and it is implied that Marr uses it to conquer the world of Titan with the creature either as Marr's second-in-command or slaughtered by his crew.

There are several diversions, such as the Testing Grounds where crew for the Galleykeep are recruited, but although they have a long decision tree all paths lead to death or failure.

== Reference 213 ==
At one point in the story the character finds a pendant that allows the player to locate secret passageways when used, achieved by adding 20 to any reference when it begins with the phrase "You find yourself..." Reference 213 commences with "You reach...", but adding 20 leads the player to a paragraph that states a secret door has been found, thereby allowing game progression. It is unknown as to whether this was an error or Jackson's deliberate attempt to encourage lateral thinking - just as the bestial protagonist is forced to do within the narrative.

Reviewer Stephen Bond stated that this feature was unique in that it was the only aspect of a story in the Fighting Fantasy line or any other that offered the player a chance to make a truly original choice, as opposed to taking one of several pre-programmed options.

== Reception ==
Lawrence Schick refers to Creature of Havoc as "One of the more interesting later entries in the series", and SciFiNow named it one of the best offerings in the Fighting Fantasy series. The Encyclopedia of Science Fiction comments on the experimental nature of some of the later volumes in the Fighting Fantasy series, naming Creature of Havoc as an example.

Jackson and Livingstone attributed the gamebook's popularity to its difficulty.

== Other media ==
In 2010, an electronic version of the title was released for the iPhone and iPad by Big Blue Bubble and was discontinued in 2012, when Big Blue Bubble's license on the Fighting Fantasy series expired. New Fighting Fantasy app games were later licensed and released on Android and iOS storefronts by Tin Man Games.

In 2018, the audio company FoxYason Music Productions, known for their work with Big Finish Productions announced that they would be releasing an original, full-cast audio drama based on Creature of Havoc in CD boxset with The Forest of Doom, The Citadel of Chaos and Deathtrap Dungeon for summer 2018. It will be written by David N. Smith, directed by Richard Fox and will feature Rachel Atkins returning to the role of Vale Moonwing from FoxYason Music's first release based on The Warlock of Firetop Mountain, sub-titled The Hero's Quest.
