= Curse of the Mummy =

Roleplaying gamebook by Jonathan Green

- Author: Jonathan Green
- Illustrator: Martin McKenna
- Cover artist: Martin McKenna
- Series: Fighting Fantasy: Puffin number: 59; Wizard number: 27
- Genre: Fantasy; Location: Allansia, Titan
- Publication date: Puffin: 1995; Wizard: 2007
- Media type: Print (Paperback)
- ISBN: 0-14-037553-8 (Puffin); ISBN 1-84046-802-5 (Wizard)

Curse of the Mummy is a single-player roleplaying gamebook, written by Jonathan Green, illustrated by Martin McKenna and originally published in 1995 by Puffin Books. It was later republished by Wizard Books in 2007. It forms part of Steve Jackson and Ian Livingstone's Fighting Fantasy series. It is the 59th (and last) in the original Puffin series (ISBN 0-14-037553-8) and 27th in the modern Wizard series (ISBN 1-84046-802-5). The adventure was slightly edited for the Wizard edition.

== Story ==
The player must defeat Akharis, an evil ruler from a former age, before he is resurrected. If the player fails, he will enslave all of Allansia. The player must search for Akharis' tomb in the Desert of Skulls in a race against time.

== Wizard edition ==
The Wizard editions of Curse of the Mummy and Spellbreaker have been revised in order to make them more playable. Several enemies have lower SKILL scores in the Wizard version of this book, however this has resulted in several errors in the text as other numbers that should have been changed as a result of the edits have remained the same. The description of a certain item has also been changed. The Wizard edition of Curse of the Mummy is the second to keep the cover from the original Puffin version.
