= Bloodbones =

Book by Jonathan Green

- FF26 Bloodbones, 2006 cover
- Author: Jonathan Green
- Illustrator: Tony Hough
- Cover artist: Martin McKenna
- Series: Fighting Fantasy; Wizard number: 26
- Genre: Fantasy; Location: The Old World, Titan
- Publication date: Wizard: 2006
- Media type: Print (Paperback)
- ISBN: 1-84046-765-7

Bloodbones is a single-player roleplaying gamebook written by Jonathan Green and illustrated by Tony Hough. It forms part of Steve Jackson and Ian Livingstone's Fighting Fantasy series. The book was notorious for being the "lost" Fighting Fantasy gamebook, written during the books' original run but not published until 2006. It would have been 60th in the series in the original Puffin series had it been published at the time, and is 26th in the modern Wizard series.

== Creation and publication ==
For a long time Bloodbones was considered to be the "lost" Fighting Fantasy book; however, little was known regarding Bloodbones prior to 2001. Rumours correctly suggested Jonathan Green was the author of the book and there were also a wide variety of supposed publication dates ranging from 1995 to more recent years.

Light was finally shed on the mystery in 2001 when Jonathan Green wrote a letter to a Fighting Fantasy fan containing details of the book. It was to be 300 paragraphs long, and was to be the first in a revamped Fighting Fantasy series in an attempt to re-connect with the young audience after later entries had become more complicated. The book concerned the player's quest for vengeance against the undead pirate Cinnabar, who was nicknamed Bloodbones. Green stated that he was disappointed to hear of the series' cancellation as Bloodbones was his personal favourite of the gamebooks he had written and had plot outlines for several more. It would have been illustrated by Mike Posen.

In 2002 Wizard Books began reprinting many of the original Fighting Fantasy gamebooks, and at one point the official website featured a poll calling for fan requests with regard to upcoming reprints which included Bloodbones' as one of the possible answers. Bloodbones was finally published in 2006, now a full 400 references long. The author has stated that this was the length he always intended it to be.

== Story ==
The Fighting Fantasy gamebook is set in the usual fantasy world of Titan, on the continent of The Old World. The player is seeking revenge on the pirate-lord Cinnabar for the murder of their family. It transpires that Cinnabar was killed but has been revived by voodoo. The player must find the pirates' secret hideout, beginning in the Port of Crabs. The player character encounters Cinnabar in both his undead and fully revived forms, and has a final showdown with Cinnabar's Voodoo god, Quezkari.

== Rules ==
The game uses a "Time" score to record the passing of time, but is not used after a certain point in the book. The book also uses codewords to record certain events that happen in the course of the book.

== Reception ==
In a retrospective review of Bloodbones in Black Gate, Jackson Kuhl said "Without any logic to Bloodbones's quest, there was no satisfaction in unwinding its narrative, particularly for young explorers like my son who solve puzzles by establishing patterns. Were the coordinates written on the flip-side of some doodad back in the marketplace? Who knows."
