= Legend of Zagor =

Roleplaying gamebook

- Jim Burns cover (1993)
- Author: Carl Sargent
- Illustrator: Martin McKenna
- Cover artist: Jim Burns and Martin McKenna
- Series: Fighting Fantasy: Puffin number: 54; Wizard number: 20
- Genre: Fantasy
- Publication date: Puffin: 1993; Wizard: 2004
- Media type: Print (Paperback)
- ISBN: 0-14-036566-4 (Puffin); ISBN 1-84046-551-4 (Wizard)

Legend of Zagor is a single-player roleplaying gamebook written by Carl Sargent, although it is credited to Ian Livingstone, illustrated by Martin McKenna and originally published in 1993 by Puffin Books. It was later republished by Wizard Books in 2004. It forms part of Steve Jackson and Ian Livingstone's Fighting Fantasy series. It is the 54th in the series in the original Puffin series (ISBN 0-14-036566-4) and 20th in the modern Wizard series (ISBN 1-84046-551-4).

The book is a follow-up to the previous Fighting Fantasy book Return to Firetop Mountain, which in turn was a sequel to The Warlock of Firetop Mountain.

== Story ==
Legend of Zagor is the only Fighting Fantasy gamebook to be set in Amarillia. The player plays one of four characters who must destroy Zagor, who is recovering in Castle Argent after being banished from the regular Fighting Fantasy world of Titan. The player must find Tower Chests and collect Golden Talismans and Silver Daggers to help in the final confrontation.

== Characters ==
In Legend of Zagor, the reader must play one of four different heroes: Anvar the Barbarian, Braxus the Warrior, Stubble the Dwarf or Sallazar the Wizard. Each has different strengths and weaknesses. For example, Sallazar can subtract 2 from Test your Spot Skill rolls, understand some magical writing and cast magic spells at will that other characters need scrolls to use, but cannot wear any chain mail or plate mail armour and cannot use a two-handed weapon. Each character's scores must also be rolled in a different way. This aspect of the book has been criticised as the book is significantly more difficult playing with certain characters; in particular, players using Stubble or Sallazar have found it very difficult to complete the book. Sallazar is the most likely to have low ability scores, and the book's magic system requires that combatants win an attack round for their spells to affect the enemy, which means that unless he has a sufficiently high SKILL score, the advantage of magic is all but worthless.

The heroes that the player can choose from are all characters from the Zagor Chronicles novels, who worked together as a group to destroy Zagor. One major difference, however, is the recasting of the wizard character in the novels: the wizard was a woman named Jallarial, whose brother Sallazar was killed before the story began. Jallarial does not appear in the gamebook; the wizard's role is instead taken up by Sallazar, who is alive and well.

== Author ==
While Ian Livingstone is credited with writing Legend of Zagor, it was actually written by Zagor Chronicles co-author, Carl Sargent (who wrote gamebooks under the name Keith Martin).

== Gamebook artwork ==
There is a portrait of Ian Livingstone hidden in the interior art of the game book. It is the face of the man sitting behind a desk, wearing a leather skullcap, in the picture for reference number 194. Artist Martin McKenna added the author's face to his artwork for all the game books he illustrated that were written by Livingstone.

== Other references ==
In 1993, a Legend of Zagor boardgame was designed by Ian Livingstone and produced by Parker brothers. It featured the same choice of heroes as the gamebook, moulded plastic board and miniatures, and an electronic voiceover the character of Zagor.

A series of novels featuring the arrival of Zagor to the land of Amarillia and the battle to defeat him, The Zagor Chronicles, were written by Ian Livingstone and Carl Sargent. They are related to Legend of Zagor, with many characters appearing in both the gamebook and the novels.

The world of Amarillia first appeared in the 1987 book Casket of Souls by Livingstone.
