= Return to Firetop Mountain =

1992 book by Ian Livingstone

- Les Edwards cover (1992)
- Author: Ian Livingstone
- Illustrator: Martin McKenna
- Cover artist: Les Edwards
- Series: Fighting Fantasy: Puffin number: 50; Wizard number: 16
- Genre: Fantasy
- Publication date: Puffin: 1992; Wizard: 2003
- Media type: Print (Paperback)
- ISBN: 0-14-036008-5 (Puffin); ISBN 1-84046-481-X (Wizard)

Return to Firetop Mountain is a single-player roleplaying gamebook written by Ian Livingstone and illustrated by Martin McKenna. It was originally published in 1992 by Puffin Books and was later republished by Wizard Books in 2003. The gamebook forms part of Steve Jackson and Ian Livingstone's Fighting Fantasy series, where it is the 50th volume in the original Puffin series (ISBN 0-14-036008-5) and the 16th in the later Wizard series (ISBN 1-84046-481-X).

It is a sequel to the first Fighting Fantasy book, The Warlock of Firetop Mountain (1982), and was written to celebrate the 10th anniversary of Fighting Fantasy. Originally planned to be the final book in the series, it proved to be unexpectedly popular and prolonged the life of the series for an additional three years.

== Story ==
The player must travel to Firetop Mountain and defeat the resurrected Warlock Zagor. The book further develops the details of Zagor and the area Northern Allansia in the world of Fighting Fantasy. In The Warlock of Firetop Mountain, Zagor was portrayed as a reclusive Warlock who is guarding the treasure chest in the heart of a mountain, and the player's objective was only to obtain the treasure by slaying Zagor. In the sequel, Zagor is instead portrayed as an evil wizard who was once slain by a heroic adventurer years ago and is now resurrected, seeking revenge on Allansia. The player takes the role of another adventurer, and this time their objective is not solely to gain the treasure, but to rid Allansia of the evil Zagor.

Unlike the first book the player must actually traverse the land to get to the mountain before facing its dangers. In addition, the second half of the mountain has been changed, giving the player no particular advantage from knowledge of the layout provided in The Warlock of Firetop Mountain. There are several references to the original gamebook, including a case that housed an arrow in the original book that is found to be empty. A trap involving a sword disguised as a lever also reappears.

== Gamebook artwork ==
There is a portrait of Ian Livingstone hidden in the interior art of the game book. It is the face of the Inquisitor carrying a sword and dagger in the picture for reference number 262. Artist Martin McKenna added the author's face to his artwork for all of the game books he illustrated that were written by Livingstone.

== Popularity and other references ==
By the time Return to Firetop Mountain was published, the Puffin Fighting Fantasy series was nearing its end. The series may not have continued after this title, however due to its unexpected popularity Puffin published another nine books before they ended the series.

The character Zagor appeared in The Zagor Chronicles series of novels written by Carl Sargent. Ian Livingstone received a co-author credit for each of the novels, but in reality only supplied the series title.

Zagor also featured in Legend of Zagor, the Fighting Fantasy gamebook written by Sargent based on the novels and the Legend of Zagor board game designed by Livingstone.

== Reprint ==
The Special Limited Edition of the Wizard version used gold embossing as opposed to the usual silver.
