= Freeway Fighter =

1985 single-player roleplaying gamebook written by Ian Livingstone

- The original Puffin Books cover (1985)
- Author: Ian Livingstone
- Illustrator: Kevin Bulmer
- Cover artist: Jim Burns
- Series: Fighting Fantasy: Puffin number: 13; Wizard number: 23
- Genre: Science fiction
- Published: Puffin: 1985; Dell/Laurel-Leaf: 1986
- Media type: Print (Paperback)
- ISBN: 0-14-031710-4 (Puffin); ISBN 1-84046-565-4 (Wizard)

Freeway Fighter is a single-player roleplaying gamebook written by Ian Livingstone, illustrated by Kevin Bulmer and originally published in 1985 by Puffin Books. It was later republished by Wizard Books in 2005. It forms part of Steve Jackson and Ian Livingstone's Fighting Fantasy series. It is the 13th in the series in the original Puffin series (ISBN 0-14-031710-4) and 23rd in the modern Wizard series (ISBN 1-84046-565-4).

== Rules ==
Freeway Fighter featured an additional game mechanic: both the player's character and their vehicle have attributes for combat, as there is a combination of both individual and vehicle-based combat. The player's vehicle must also be continually supplied with petrol, with the fuel gauge reaching zero resulting in failure and ending the game. The title features only 380 references as opposed to the typical 400.

== Story ==
Freeway Fighter is a science-fiction adventure scenario in which the hero must journey through the wilderness to find needed supplies from an oil refinery, to save his town New Hope. Game designer Lawrence Schick describes the scenario as being the same type as Mad Max or Car Wars.

The story takes places in a post-apocalyptic United States, after much of the world's population has fallen victim to a deadly plague. The survivors huddle together in isolated settlements, while the roads are dominated by lawless nomads in heavily armed vehicles. The player takes the role of a citizen of the town New Hope who must drive their armed Dodge Interceptor motorcar across the wastes in order to procure a tanker filled with a fresh supply of petrol for their community. The story also provides a secondary quest: locating and rescuing a kidnapped New Hope leader from outlaws.

== Comic ==
A comic series based on Freeway Fighter was published by Titan Comics in May 2017.

== See also ==
- Freeway Warrior, four post-apocalyptic gamebooks written by Joe Dever, known for the Lone Wolf series
- Battlecars, an earlier wargame by Ian Livingstone with a similar setting
