= Deathtrap Dungeon =

1984 adventure gamebook

- The original Puffin Books cover
- Author: Ian Livingstone
- Illustrator: Iain McCaig
- Cover artist: Puffin: Iain McCaig; Wizard: Mel Grant
- Series: Fighting Fantasy: Puffin number: 6; Wizard number: 3
- Genre: Fantasy
- Publication date: Puffin: 1984; Dell/Laurel-Lead: 1984; Wizard: 2002
- Media type: Print (Paperback)
- ISBN: 0-14-031708-2 (Puffin); ISBN 1-84046-388-0 (Wizard)
- Preceded by: City of Thieves
- Followed by: Island of the Lizard King

Deathtrap Dungeon is a single-player adventure gamebook written by Ian Livingstone, and illustrated by Iain McCaig. Originally published by Puffin Books in 1984, the title is the sixth gamebook in the Fighting Fantasy series. It was later republished by Wizard Books in 2002.

== Story ==
Deathtrap Dungeon is a fantasy adventure taking place in a hazardous labyrinth in the city of Fang. The player takes the role of an adventurer who decides to enter Baron Sukumvit's "Trial of Champions" and brave "Deathtrap Dungeon". Competing against five other adventurers, the player must defeat monsters, navigate the maze of dungeons and collect certain gems, which are the key to escaping and winning the Trial.

== Sequels ==
The title was followed by two sequels, Trial of Champions (21st title, 1986), and Armies of Death (36th title, 1988).

== Reception ==
Marcus L. Rowland reviewed Deathtrap Dungeon for the May 1984 issue of White Dwarf, rating the title 8 out of a possible 10. Rowland stated that the format of Deathtrap Dungeon was "extremely simple, and resembles the plot of many early D&D scenarios".

== Reviews ==
- Coleção Dragon Slayer

== Other media ==
In 1998, a Deathtrap Dungeon video game was released, developed by Asylum Studios and published by Eidos Interactive for the PlayStation and Microsoft Windows.

The gamebook was also converted into a 40-page d20 System role-playing adventure by Jamie Wallis. It was published by Myriador in 2003 and reissued in pdf format by Greywood Publishing in 2008.

In 2010, the title was re-released in electronic form for the iPhone and iPad by Big Blue Bubble. When Big Blue Bubble later lost the license, all its apps were withdrawn.

In 2011, Mark Holdom Inc. announced a project to adapt Deathtrap Dungeon for the cinema, "a cross between Saw and Gladiator".

In 2018, the audio company FoxYason Music Productions, known for their work with Big Finish Productions announced that they would be releasing an original, full-cast audio drama based on Deathtrap Dungeon in a CD boxset with The Citadel of Chaos, The Forest of Doom, and Creature of Havoc for summer 2018. It will be written by David N. Smith, directed by Richard Fox and will feature Rachel Atkins returning to the role of Vale Moonwing from FoxYason Music's first release based on The Warlock of Firetop Mountain, sub-titled The Hero's Quest.

In 2020, an interactive video game called Deathtrap Dungeon: The Interactive Video Adventure featuring narration by Eddie Marsan was released, developed and published by Branching Narrative Ltd on Steam for PC and Mac, iOS and Android.
