= Revenge of the Vampire =

Revenge of the Vampire may refer to:

- Black Sunday, a 1960 Italian gothic horror film
- List of Fighting Fantasy gamebooks
