= Temple of Terror (video game) =

1987 video game

- Publisher: Adventure Soft
- Platforms: Commodore 64, ZX Spectrum
- Release: WW: 1987
- Genre: Role-playing video game
- Mode: Single player

Temple of Terror is a video game published by Adventure Soft in 1987 for the Commodore 64 and ZX Spectrum.

== Gameplay ==
Temple of Terror is an adaptation of the Fighting Fantasy gamebook, Temple of Terror.

== Reception ==
Zzap!64 reviewed the game, rating it 35% overall, and stated that "I have to admit that they show very little advance in design or content over, for example, The Hulk - or even some of the earlier titles like Adventureland. Come on boys, we're in the Infocom Age, not the Stone Age ..."
