= Fiend Folio =

Dungeons & Dragons monsters book

- AD&D 1st Edition Fiend Folio, featuring a githyanki on the cover
- Editor: Don Turnbull
- Genre: Role-playing game
- Publisher: TSR
- Publication date: 1981
- Media type: Print (Hardback)
- Pages: 128
- ISBN: 0-935696-21-0
- OCLC: 11291023
- Dewey Decimal: 794 19
- LC Class: GV1469.D8 F54 1981

Fiend Folio is the name of three separate products published for successive editions of the fantasy role-playing game Dungeons & Dragons (D&D). All three are collections of monsters.

The bulk of the material in the first edition came from the British gaming magazine White Dwarf, rather than being authored by Gary Gygax, the game's co-creator. Readers and gamers had submitted creatures to the "Fiend Factory" department of the magazine, and the most highly regarded of those appearing in the first thirteen issues were selected to be in the publication.

== Publication history ==
=== Advanced Dungeons & Dragons 1st edition ===
Games Workshop, with Don Turnbull as editor, originally intended to develop and publish the Fiend Folio tome (ISBN 0-935696-21-0) in late 1979 as the second Monster Manual volume, and would be officially recognized by TSR as an Advanced Dungeons & Dragons product, with the monsters mostly taken from submissions to White Dwarf's "Fiend Factory" column. At the time, Games Workshop was the holder of the license to publish D&D game products in the United Kingdom. Although the manuscript was completed on time by editor Don Turnbull, a business dispute between Games Workshop and TSR Hobbies delayed publication of the book for nearly two years. The Fiend Folio was finally published in August 1981 by TSR itself, which used the product to launch its UK division.

Much of the material for the 128-page hardcover Fiend Folio was drawn from early issues of White Dwarf. Also edited by Turnbull, the magazine's "Fiend Factory" column featured new AD&D monsters, many of them created by gamers who read the magazine. The majority of monsters in the Fiend Folio were designed by British contributors, each of whom received an acknowledgement in the index. The book used the same format as that of the Monster Manual, concisely detailing the attributes and abilities of each monster. Some illustrations by Emmanuel were previously featured in the "Fiend Factory" column from issue 12: the Assassin Bug, Githyanki, Grell and Giant Bloodworm. Besides creatures from the column, jermlaine, drow, kuo-toa, and svirfneblin, all of which had previously appeared in adventure modules from TSR, were included. Turnbull also included creatures that had been submitted to the magazine, but not published in the column. Aside from monsters, the book presents tables to generate random encounters in dungeon and outdoor environments, as well as the Astral and Ethereal Planes; these encounter tables include creatures from both the Monster Manual and Fiend Folio, and can replace the tables from the Dungeon Master's Guide.

The githyanki, designed by Charles Stross and first appearing in White Dwarf, was introduced to most D&D players in the Fiend Folio. The githyanki was featured on the cover, which helped it gain traction among the D&D community. Not all creatures featured on covers have done as well; the firbolg appeared on the cover of 1983's Monster Manual II and had as of 2007 slipped back into obscurity. It began to see a resurgence with the 5th edition of D&D in 2016, when they became a playable race.

Monsters featured in the Folio were originally submitted by Stross, Ian Livingstone, and Tom Moldvay, among others. Interior illustrations were supplied by Chris Baker, Jeff Dee, Emmanuel (who also illustrated the cover), Albie Fiore, Alan Hunter, Russ Nicholson, Erol Otus, Jim Roslof, David C. Sutherland III, Bill Willingham, Polly Wilson, and Tony Yates.

The publication of "Fiend Factory" monsters had one unintended side-effect for Citadel Miniatures, who had the contract to produce gaming miniatures based on White Dwarf features. As a condition of including "Factory" monsters in the Folio, Games Workshop transferred the copyright on those monsters to TSR, who already had an exclusive contract with Grenadier Models. This forced Citadel to discontinue miniatures depicting "Factory" monsters that appeared in the Folio.

In 1983, TSR used the Monster Manual II to introduce a new orange spine cover design for hardcover AD&D manuals. The Fiend Folio was the only AD&D hardcover that did not have its cover redesigned to match the new style; instead, TSR let the Folio go out of print. In 1985, as TSR was getting ready to begin work on the AD&D 2nd edition, Gary Gygax stated that he was planning to incorporate material from the Fiend Folio into a revised Monster Manual for the new edition. However, Gygax resigned from TSR in October 1986, before the second edition was produced.

In 1999, a paperback reprint of the first edition was released.

=== Advanced Dungeons & Dragons 2nd edition ===
The Monstrous Compendium Fiend Folio Appendix (ISBN 1-56076-428-7) was published by TSR, Inc. in April 1992, for use with the 2nd edition AD&D rules. It is the fourteenth volume of the Monstrous Compendium series (abbreviated "MC14"), consisting of a cardboard cover, sixty four loose-leaf pages, and four divider pages. Sometimes referred to simply as the Fiend Folio Appendix, it contains over sixty monsters created or updated by members of the RPGA, including revised versions of many monsters introduced in the original Fiend Folio.

=== Dungeons & Dragons 3rd edition ===
Fiend Folio
- Authors: Eric Cagle, Jesse Decker, James Jacobs, Erik Mona, Matt Sernett, Chris Thomasson, and James Wyatt
- Genre: Role-playing game
- Publisher: Wizards of the Coast
- Publication date: 2003
- Media type: Print (Hardback)
- Pages: 224
- ISBN: 0-7869-2780-1

The third Fiend Folio (ISBN 0-7869-2780-1) was designed by Eric Cagle, Jesse Decker, James Jacobs, Erik Mona, Matt Sernett, Chris Thomasson, and James Wyatt, and was published in April 2003 for use with the 3rd edition Dungeons & Dragons rules. Cover art was by Brom and Henry Higginbotham, with interior art by Glen Angus, Darren Bader, Thomas Baxa, Matt Cavotta, Dennis Cramer, Larry Dixon, Jeff Easley, Scott Fischer, Lars Grant-West, Jeremy Jarvis, Todd Lockwood, Kevin McCann, Raven Mimura, Matthew Mitchell, Puddnhead, Wayne Reynolds, Richard Sardinha, Marc Sasso, Brian Snoddy, Arnie Swekel, Ben Templesmith, Anthony Waters, and Sam Wood. The 224-page hardcover manual includes only a few monsters from the original, but added many new creatures, with an emphasis on monsters with extraplanar origins. The book contains more than 150 monsters, with more than half of them being all-new.

The Fiend Folio was released before the 3rd edition rules were revised to the 3.5 edition; the book's designers tried to foresee changes due to appear in the revised Monster Manual and implement them in the Fiend Folio. The extraplanar and swarm subtypes, and the allocation of skill points and feats to function the same way as they did for player characters, were introduced in this book, and then featured in the revised version of the Monster Manual. The book also introduced three prestige classes for fiends: fiend of blasphemy, fiend of corruption, and fiend of possession. This edition also introduced grafts and symbionts as new elements to the game; grafts are like living cybernetics and symbionts are living equipment.

The Fiend Folio also introduced two demons more powerful than balors: klurichirs and myrmyxicus. It also introduced a devil more powerful than pit fiends: the paeliryon.

Many of the creatures from the 1st edition Fiend Folio were updated to the d20 rules by Necromancer Games in their ENnie award winning Tome of Horrors.

== Reception ==
David F. Nalle reviewed Fiend Folio for Different Worlds magazine and stated that "I cannot honestly recommend this play aid to most game masters. It is a limp effort at best. It was clearly written more to make money than to expand the field, and it would probably not add anything to most FRP campaigns [...] This book is definitely not to the taste of every GM, and its value will vary from campaign to campaign."

TSR's Dragon magazine featured two separate reviews of the book in issue #55 (November 1981). Ed Greenwood called the book a disappointment, citing its lack of detail and "breaches of consistency". He felt that there were many incomplete or inadequate monster entries, and also criticized the book for having too many new undead and too many new races. Greenwood, however, did consider the slaad, elemental princes of evil, and penanggalan "worthy additions to any campaign" and noted that the previously published drow and kuo-toa were "expected attractions, but good to see nonetheless." Contributor Alan Zumwait also reviewed the book, noting that a few of the inclusions were "just Monster Manual creatures that are changed or crossbred with other monsters." He was pleased by the inclusion of the neutral Oriental dragons, but felt that their descriptions were inferior to those of the dragons in the Monster Manual. He also liked the slaad and elemental princes of evil, but felt they should both have counterparts of other alignments. Zumwait summed up his review by stating, "the FIEND FOLIO Tome is like a basket of peaches: Most of it is pretty good stuff, but part of it is the pits." At the urging of Kim Mohan, Don Turnbull wrote a rebuttal, which was printed in the same issue. Turnbull cited the publication's legal holdups, and the AD&D game's evolution during that time, as part of the reason for the work's inconsistencies. He also felt that Greenwood's concerns of incompleteness and inadequacy were a matter of subjective personal taste.

AD&D creator Gary Gygax was also critical of errors in the book. Gygax noted that due to "premature actions", TSR got "the cart in advance of the horse" by mentioning a spell (advanced illusion) and a magic item (the philosopher's stone) which had not yet appeared in a game manual, promising they would eventually appear in game material in 1983. Gygax later commented on an individual who had criticized the Deities & Demigods Cyclopedia, noting that this was the same individual responsible for errors on the Fiend Folio's random encounter tables, among other errors.

The Fiend Folio was given an 8 out of 10 in the December 1981/January 1982 issue of White Dwarf. Reviewer Jamie Thomson compared it to the Monster Manual (MM) in format, and felt the Folio's artwork was better. Thompson felt the biggest distinction was that while the MM was American, the Folio was of British origin. Creatures he commented on were the giant bat ("seems an obvious choice for D&D"), the death dog ("rumored to be a descendant of Cerberus"), Lolth ("which often appears on fantasy literature"), the elemental princes of evil, and the drow ("who figure prominently in a number of TSR dungeon modules"). Also mentioned were the penanggalon, the caterwaul, the death knight, and the revenant. In summary, Thomson recommended the book for readers who wanted more monsters, but that if they did not already possess the MM it was not essential.

Lawrence Schick commented on the book's contents in his 1991 book Heroic Worlds: "Some of the monsters are really goofy—you're sure to find several good belly laughs in this volume. A dozen or so entries are genuinely imaginative and useful."

In his 2023 book Monsters, Aliens, and Holes in the Ground, RPG historian Stu Horvath noted, "while Fiend Folio was largely a dead-end for AD&D, it is a glimpse into the future of a behemoth of a different sort ... All of these aesthetic choices would coalesce in the years to come in the Fighting Fantasy series of adventures gamebooks and in the many faces of Games Workshop's gore-flecked, heavy metal-influenced Warhammer franchise."

== Reviews ==
- Backstab #47
- Adventure Gaming #5
