= Steve Jackson's Sorcery! =

Adventure gamebook series, 1983 to 1985

- Cover of The Shamutanti Hills (1983). Art by John Blanche.
- The Shamutanti Hills; Kharé: Cityport of Traps; The Seven Serpents; The Crown of Kings
- Author: Steve Jackson
- Illustrator: John Blanche
- Genre: Fantasy
- Publisher: Penguin Books; Puffin Books; Wizard Books
- Published: 1983 - 1985

Sorcery!, originally titled Steve Jackson's Sorcery!, is a single-player four-part adventure gamebook series written by Steve Jackson and illustrated by John Blanche. Originally published by Penguin Books between 1983 and 1985, the titles are part of the Fighting Fantasy canon, but released as a separate series from the main 59-book series. Sorcery! was re-published by Wizard Books in 2003, and later adapted into a video game series by Inkle from 2013 to 2016.

== Publication history ==
The Sorcery! series was published by Penguin Books (and later by their Puffin Books imprint) as four individual titles, beginning in 1983 with The Shamutanti Hills, followed by Kharé: Cityport of Traps and The Seven Serpents in 1984, and The Crown of Kings in 1985.

Each title could be played as a standalone adventure or as part of the overarching story arc. The series was supported by the Sorcery! Spellbook, published in 1983, which was later incorporated as an appendix into the four titles in subsequent printings. A boxed set titled Sorcery! was released, containing both The Shamutanti Hills and the spellbook. The series was reissued by Wizard Books in 2003.

== Rules ==
Sorcery! features several mechanics not present in previous Fighting Fantasy gamebooks. The principal difference is the ability to choose between playing as a warrior or a wizard. As a wizard, the player is weaker in combat, but has access to 48 spells, with each appearing as a three-letter word that has to be memorised by the player. Examples include ZAP (creates a lightning bolt from the finger) and HOT (creates a fireball). When given the option to cast spells the player is presented with a small selection of these three-letter words to choose from; the player is encouraged to choose from these without consulting the spell listing. It is also possible to fail to cast at all, as false spell words are placed alongside correct choices. Many spells also require a certain item (e.g. GOB requires one or more goblin teeth). If the character does not have the necessary equipment then the spell fails. All spell choices, irrespective of the outcome, incur a Stamina penalty.

Warriors and wizards share the ability to call on the character's patron goddess, Libra, once each adventure. The goddess can perform a range of services, such as restoring lost Skill/Stamina/Luck points or curing a curse, or in specific locations, providing an automatic escape from that situation.

The series features strong continuity: it is possible for a reader to use the same character – complete with any upgraded abilities and equipment – through each of the titles, and also use hidden clues found in one title to assist with a situation in another. Each title also features dice images at the bottom of each page, making it possible for the player to randomly "flick" through the pages for the equivalent of a dice roll.

== Plot ==
"Your search for the legendary Crown of Kings takes you to the Shamutanti Hills. Alive with evil creatures, lawless wanderers and bloodthirsty monsters, the land is riddled with tricks and traps waiting for the unwary traveller. Will you be able to cross the hills safely and proceed to the second part of the adventure – or will you perish in the attempt?"

The story is set on the fictional Fighting Fantasy world of Titan, on the continent known as the Old World. A powerful artifact known as the Crown of Kings, which bestows magical powers of leadership upon its owner, has been stolen from the land of Analand by the cruel Archmage of Mampang Fortress. With the Crown, the Archmage will be able to gain leadership of the lawless and brutal region of Kakhabad and begin an invasion of surrounding kingdoms. The player takes on the role of the lone hero, referred to only as the Analander, who has been dispatched to retrieve the Crown, thereby averting the invasion and saving Analand from terrible disgrace. The quest itself is divided across the four titles in the series:

The Shamutanti Hills

Details the player's attempt to navigate the hills and plains surrounding Analand while defeating various monsters and avoiding traps.

Kharé – Cityport of Traps

Relates the player's attempt to pass through the city of Kharé and find the four lines of a spell required to open the Northern Gate and allow an exit from the city.

The Seven Serpents

The player crosses the Baklands, a vast and dangerous wasteland, attempting to find and defeat seven magical serpents: servants of the Archmage who are travelling to warn their master of the Analander's approach.

The Crown of Kings

The final adventure details the player’s attempt to find and penetrate Mampang Fortress – stronghold of the Archmage – and defeat the enemy before reclaiming the Crown of Kings.

== In other media ==
=== Myriador pen-and-paper d20 modules ===
The first three gamebooks in the series were converted into 40-page d20 System multi-player role-playing adventures by Jamie Wallis. They were published by Myriador in 2003 and 2004 respectively, and reissued in pdf format by Greywood Publishing in 2009. The fourth and final installment was never released.

- d20 Fighting Fantasy 4 / Steve Jackson's Sorcery!: The Shamutanti Hills ISBN 1904629032
- d20 Fighting Fantasy 6 / Steve Jackson's Sorcery!: Kharé - Cityport of Traps ISBN 1904629059
- d20 Fighting Fantasy 8 / Steve Jackson's Sorcery!: The Seven Serpents ISBN 1904629075

=== Inkle Studios video game ===
The gamebook series have been ported to computerized media as Steve Jackson's Sorcery! by Inkle. The first part was released for iOS in 2013, and by 2016 all four parts were available for iOS, Android, and Steam (on Mac and PC).

=== Arion Games pen-and-paper adventure book ===
The four gamebooks were converted into a RPG adventure book by Graham Bottley, for the Advanced Fighting Fantasy system. The book was titled Crown of Kings:The Sorcery! Campaign, and was published in 2012 by Arion Games. The book was credited to Jackson and Bottley. The book also reprinted Blanche's illustrations.

== Reception ==
Pete Tamlyn reviewed Sorcery for Imagine magazine, and stated that "Sorcery is actually a fine example of back-to-basics role-playing. I'd like to see more (preferably RPG-orientated) like it."

Marcus L. Rowland reviewed Sorcery for White Dwarf #50, giving it an overall rating of 7 out of 10, and stated that "I'm not sure how successful the book will be with the non-gaming public, but anyone wanting something to pass a few hours between games won't go far wrong with Sorcery." He later reviewed Kharé - Cityport of Traps for issue #54, giving it an overall rating of 8 out of 10 if used as a continuation of Sorcery (but only 6 if used as an independent adventure), and stated that "I liked this book, but I think it is only at its best if the magic system is available and the reader is prepared to use it without cheating."

== Reviews ==
- Jeux & Stratégie #34
- Jeux & Stratégie #36
