= The Tasks of Tantalon =

The Tasks of Tantalon is a puzzle book written by Steve Jackson, and illustrated by Stephen Lavis. It was published by Oxford University Press in 1985.

== Contents ==
The Tasks of Tantalon presents a series of thirteen challenging puzzles, with clues hidden in complex color illustrations. Each puzzle results in a numerical answer. As in the Fighting Fantasy series of gamebooks, the puzzles are integrated into an overarching storyline with detailed illustrations. The reader is given twelve tasks by an aging wizard who seeks to find a successor worthy of ruling the fantasy kingdom of Gallantria. Completing the twelve tasks reveals a thirteenth and final challenge.

== Production ==
The book came into being when David Fickling, an editor at Oxford University Press, approached Steve Jackson and Ian Livingstone with the idea of creating a gamebook aimed at younger children. Fickling's concept was "a work that would attract readers with vibrant illustrations, instead of offering a wide range of choices or using dice," but Jackson showed no interest in works for children. However, this gave Jackson the idea to make "vibrant illustrations" the subject of the book itself, rather than merely a cover design.

Inspired by the twelve Labours of Hercules in Greek mythology, Jackson believed that a similar concept could open up new possibilities in Fighting Fantasy, and so he began working on designing the puzzles. During his July train journey from Edinburgh to London, Jackson figured out 10 of the puzzles.

Jackson and Fickling then began searching for an illustrator, but finding someone willing to undertake such a voluminous project that would take two years was not easy. Finally, Stephen Lavis, whom Fickling brought in, was completely thrilled with the idea for this book, and he and Jackson had several lunches at pubs, engaging in heated discussions. Lavis was previously known for illustrating book covers for works by Alan Garner and C. S. Lewis. Initially, the book was titled The Tasks of Tantalus, but it was later renamed The Tasks of Tantalon after it was discovered that there was a character named Tantalus in Greek mythology.

When the book was published in September 1985, Jackson began receiving hundreds of letters from readers seeking hints and answers. One reviewer said that the book was a "disappointment" because the puzzles were too challenging to be rewarding; the reviewer was unable to solve most of them, and a child "test reader" abandoned the book in frustration. However, no publisher was willing to publish only the answer key, as it wouldn't generate significant sales. Therefore, Jackson self-published and distributed a booklet containing hints for this book.
