= Island of the Lizard King =

Book by Ian Livingstone

- The original Puffin Books cover (1984)
- Author: Ian Livingstone
- Illustrator: Alan Langford
- Cover artist: Puffin: Iain McCaig; Wizard: Martin McKenna
- Series: Fighting Fantasy: Puffin number: 7; Wizard number: 17
- Genre: Fantasy
- Publication date: Puffin: 1984; Dell/Laurel-Leaf: 1985; Wizard: 2002
- Media type: Print (Paperback)
- ISBN: 0-14-031743-0 (Puffin); ISBN 1-84046-491-7 (Wizard)

Island of the Lizard King is a single-player adventure gamebook written by Ian Livingstone, and illustrated by Alan Langford. Originally published by Puffin Books in 1984, the title is the seventh gamebook in the Fighting Fantasy series. It was later republished by Wizard Books in 2002. A digital version developed by Tin Man Games was released for Android and iOS.

== Story ==
The player takes the role of an adventurer tasked with stopping the Lizard King and freeing the human slaves captured by his army. Gameplay takes the form of a campaign: battling Lizard Men and various other monsters across the island whilst collecting information as to the Lizard King's weakness, which will be required during the final confrontation.

== Reception ==
Marcus L. Rowland reviewed Island of the Lizard King for the May 1984 issue of White Dwarf, rating the title 8 out of a possible 10. Rowland claimed that Island of the Lizard King "seemed to contain more monsters and less traps than others in the series, and most of the traps seemed to be fair", concluding that this was "probably the toughest adventure of this series, since few options allow the adventurer to avoid a fight".

== Reviews ==
- School Library Journal (April 1985)

== In other media ==
A digital version developed by Tin Man Games is available for Android and iOS.
