= Clash of the Princes =

- Clash of the Princes: box case front (1986)
- Authors: Andrew Chapman; Martin Allen
- Illustrator: John Blanche
- Cover artist: John Blanche
- Genre: Fantasy
- Publisher: Puffin Books
- Publication date: 1986
- Media type: Boxed set
- ISBN: 0-14-095314-0

Clash of the Princes is a boxed set consisting of The Warrior's Way and The Warlock's Way, released by Puffin Books in 1986, written by Andrew Chapman and Martin Allen and illustrated by John Blanche. They can be played as standard Fighting Fantasy gamebooks or combined for a two-player experience. In the two-player game, two scores (Action and Status) are kept track of on a piece of paper in order to keep both players' game experiences synchronized.

The books are set in the land of "Gundobad" on Titan, but the books do not say where or when Gundobad is on Titan, leading fans to speculate about its location. They were the first Fighting Fantasy books to drop out of print as retailers at the time were not fans of boxed sets.

== Reception ==
Adventurer magazine reviewed Clash of the Princes and stated that "Standard Fighting Fantasy stuff, the books can also be played solo, though where the challenge is then, I cannot say."
