= Fantasy Interactive Scenarios by Telephone =

Series of telephone-based roleplaying games

- The F.I.S.T. logo as it appeared in print ads
- Designers: Steve Jackson
- Publishers: Computerdial
- Publication: 1988
- Genres: Fantasy
- Systems: Play by Telephone

Fantasy Interactive Scenarios by Telephone (F.I.S.T.) were a series of single-player telephone-based roleplaying games launched by UK games designer Steve Jackson in 1988 through the company Computerdial, who until then had used their service to provide astrology services. The product was a radio drama version of Jackson's popular Fighting Fantasy novels, and the outcome of the story could be affected by choices the user made, using a touch-tone telephone. A free starter pack could be ordered by sending a self-addressed stamped envelope to the game creators.

Two scenarios were produced for the F.I.S.T. game. The first of these was released under the title F.I.S.T. 1 – Castle Mammon: Lair of the Demon Prince in September 1988, and the second was a direct sequel titled F.I.S.T. 2 – The Rings of Allion in March 1989.

Players could register over the phone and create a character, which would be saved and restored the next time the player called. Both games were dungeon crawls, depicting the player's unnamed character progressing through the titular Castle Mammon in an attempt to slay the Demon Prince Kaddis Ra. The games featured sound effects and voice-overs illustrating the adventures of the character. Combat consisted of the player being read a description of what their opponent was doing, and pushing a key combination to take action or cast a spell in response. The last message could be repeated at any time by pushing 0, and the player could access their 'character status report' by pushing 9. From here the game could also be saved and quit (called 'sending character to limbo'). By noting down a numerical code, the player could then call in at a later point to continue the game from where they left off. Although a solo-game, players could hear the high scores of other players, and physical gold coins were awarded monthly to the highest scoring players. There was also 'The Black Claw Tavern', a group discussion line which connected with other adventurers calling at the same time.

== 2024 remake ==
On December 2, 2023, Swedish games publisher Sound Realms announced the return of Steve Jackson's F.I.S.T. The new version of F.I.S.T. would feature the original audio recordings and gameplay mechanics, but now published as part of the Sound Realms app, a "platform for audio adventures". The Sound Realms version of F.I.S.T. was released on September 7, 2024.
