= The Forest of Doom =

Single-player adventure gamebook written by Ian Livingstone

- Cover of the first edition
- Author: Ian Livingstone
- Illustrator: Malcolm Barter
- Cover artist: Puffin: Iain McCaig; Wizard: Martin McKenna
- Series: Fighting Fantasy: Puffin number: 3; Wizard number: 8
- Genre: Fantasy; Location: Allansia, Titan
- Publication date: Puffin: 1983; Dell/Laurel-Leaf: 1984; Wizard: 2003
- Media type: Print (Paperback)
- ISBN: 0-14-031604-3 (Puffin); ISBN 1-84046-429-1 (Wizard)
- Preceded by: The Citadel of Chaos
- Followed by: Starship Traveller

The Forest of Doom is a single-player adventure gamebook written by Ian Livingstone, and illustrated by Malcolm Barter. Originally published by Puffin Books in 1983, the title is the third gamebook in the Fighting Fantasy series, and the first of several to feature the character Yaztromo. It was later republished by Wizard Books in 2002. The gamebook was also adapted into a video game.

== Plot ==
The Forest of Doom is a fantasy adventure scenario in which the hero character travels through a hazardous forest in search of the missing pieces of a magic warhammer needed to assist the dwarves in their war against the trolls.

== Reception ==
Marcus L. Rowland reviewed The Forest of Doom for the June 1983 issue of White Dwarf, rating the title a 10 out of a possible 10. Rowland suggested that only "[r]eally stupid players" would try to loot the home of the mage, because they "will not like the consequences", and noted the lethality of the forest area with "some encounters being survivable only by luck or remarkably good combat rolls, while others can be settled without any conflict".

Tony Watson reviewed The Forest of Doom for Different Worlds magazine and stated that "On the whole, I found The Forest of Doom a diverting, if simple, solo adventure. While it certainly won't replace solitaire adventures for the various fantasy role-playing games on the market, the simple system provided in the booklet works very well and raises the Dell line above the rest of these sort of books. The Forest of Doom and the other books in the series might be just the right gift for someone interested in role-playing but a bit hesitant about the rules that usually accompany most role-playing games."

== In other media ==
A ZX Spectrum and Commodore 64 video game based on the book was released by Puffin Books in 1984.

The gamebook was also converted into a 40-page d20 System role-playing adventure by Jamie Wallis. It was published by Myriador in 2004 and reissued in pdf format by Greywood Publishing in 2008.

This gamebook has later been released by Tin Man Games.

In 2018, the audio company FoxYason Music Productions, known for their work with Big Finish Productions announced that they would be releasing an original, full-cast audio drama based on The Forest of Doom in a CD boxset with The Citadel of Chaos, Deathtrap Dungeon, and Creature of Havoc for summer 2018. It will be written by David N. Smith, directed by Richard Fox and will feature Rachel Atkins returning to the role of Vale Moonwing from FoxYason Music's first release based on The Warlock of Firetop Mountain, sub-titled The Hero's Quest.
