= City of Thieves (gamebook) =

1983 gamebook by Ian Livingstone

- Cover of the first edition, featuring art by Iain McCaig
- Author: Ian Livingstone
- Illustrator: Iain McCaig
- Cover artist: Puffin: Iain McCaig; Wizard: Martin McKenna
- Series: Fighting Fantasy: Puffin number: 5; Wizard number: 5
- Genre: Fantasy; Location: Port Blacksand, Allansia, Titan
- Publication date: Puffin: 1983; Dell/Laurel-Leaf: 1984; Wizard: 2002
- Media type: Print (Paperback)
- ISBN: 0-14-031645-0 (Puffin); ISBN 1-84046-397-X (Wizard)
- Preceded by: Starship Traveller
- Followed by: Deathtrap Dungeon

City of Thieves is a single-player adventure gamebook written by Ian Livingstone and illustrated by Iain McCaig. Originally published by Puffin Books in 1983, the title is the fifth gamebook in the Fighting Fantasy series. It was later republished by Wizard Books in 2002.

== Plot ==
City of Thieves is a fantasy adventure scenario of a single character who the village of Silverton hires to defeat Zanbar Bone, lord of the undead. The character needs to go to Port Blacksand to get help from the magician Nicodemus to succeed in saving the village.

The player takes the role of an adventurer on a quest to find and stop the powerful Night Prince Zanbar Bone, a being whose minions are terrorizing a local town. Hired by a desperate mayor, the player must, as the adventurer journey to the dangerous city-state of Port Blacksand (the titular "City of Thieves"), and find the wizard Nicodemus, who apparently knows of Bone's one weakness. What follows is a series of challenges as the player must locate certain key items, escape Port Blacksand and eventually confront Bone.

== Reception ==
Marcus L. Rowland reviewed City of Thieves for the January 1984 issue of White Dwarf, rating the title 8 out of a possible 10. According to Rowland, "Most encounters in the city are potentially lethal, several being no-win situations where the best outcome involves injury or loss of money."

== Reviews ==
- Review by Don D'Ammassa (1984) in Science Fiction Chronicle, #61 October 1984
