= The Citadel of Chaos =

Adventure gamebook by Steve Jackson

- Cover of the first edition
- Author: Steve Jackson
- Illustrator: Russ Nicholson and Malcolm Barter
- Cover artist: Puffin: Emmanuel and Ian Miller; U.S.: Richard Corben; Wizard: Kevin Jenkins
- Series: Fighting Fantasy: Puffin number: 2; Wizard number: 2
- Genre: Fantasy; Location: Allansia, Titan
- Publication date: Puffin: 31 March 1983; Dell/Laurel-Leaf: 1983; Wizard: 2002
- Media type: Print (Paperback)
- ISBN: 0-14-031603-5 (Puffin); ISBN 1-84046-389-9 (Wizard)
- Preceded by: The Warlock of Firetop Mountain
- Followed by: The Forest of Doom

The Citadel of Chaos is a single-player adventure gamebook written by Steve Jackson and illustrated by Russ Nicholson. Originally published by Puffin Books in 1983, the title is the second gamebook in the Fighting Fantasy series. It was later republished by Wizard Books in 2002. The gamebook was also adapted into a video game.

== Story ==
The Citadel of Chaos is a fantasy scenario in which the player takes the role of an adventurer magician hero who must navigate the hazardous castle of the evil wizard Balthus Dire. To confront Dire, the player must avoid monsters and collect several artefacts that will allow passage past guardians to the villain's inner sanctum.

== Reception ==
Marcus L. Rowland reviewed The Citadel of Chaos for the June 1983 issue of White Dwarf, rating the title a 9 out of a possible 10. Rowland called The Citadel of Chaos "an exciting adventure", and noted that the book's introduction of magic as an extra characteristic "adds a new range of decisions to encounters".

Karen L. Miller, staff writer at Reading Eagle, stated that the title featured "an elaborate combat system with adventure score sheets. This way you read and at the same time...conquer the dreaded sorcerer at the heart of The Citadel of Chaos".

== Reviews ==
- Coleção Dragon Slayer

== In other media ==
A video game based on the book was released by Puffin Books for the Commodore 64 in 1984.

In 2010, an electronic version of the title was released for the iPhone and iPad by Big Blue Bubble. When Big Blue Bubble later lost the license, all its apps were withdrawn.

In December of 2018, FoxYason Music Productions released a full-cast audio drama based on The Citadel of Chaos. The drama was included in a 4-CD boxset that also included productions based on The Forest of Doom, Deathtrap Dungeon, and Creature of Havoc. It was written by David N. Smith, directed by Richard Fox, and featured Rachel Atkins in the role of Vale Moonwing, a character she had previously played in FoxYason Music's adaptation of The Warlock of Firetop Mountain.
