= Deathtrap Dungeon (video game) =

1998 video game

- Developer: Asylum Studios
- Publisher: Eidos Interactive
- Director: Paul Sheppard
- Producer: Frank Hom
- Designers: Richard Halliwell; Andrew Wensley
- Programmer: Matt Curran
- Artist: Matthew Bagshaw
- Composers: Mike Ash; Steve Monk
- Series: Fighting Fantasy
- Platforms: PlayStation, Windows
- Release: PlayStation: NA: 30 March 1998; EU: 10 April 1998; Windows: NA: 25 June 1998; PAL: 3 July 1998
- Genre: Action-adventure
- Mode: Single-player

Ian Livingstone's Deathtrap Dungeon is an action-adventure video game developed by Asylum Studios and published by Eidos Interactive for PlayStation and Microsoft Windows in 1998. It is based on the adventure gamebook Deathtrap Dungeon (the sixth in the Fighting Fantasy series) written by Ian Livingstone, and published by Puffin Books in 1984. Due to its employing a similar 3D game engine, it was often compared to the Tomb Raider series, which was also published by Eidos.

Deathtrap Dungeon met with mostly negative reviews which cited poor controls and an erratic virtual camera, among other issues, though some reviewers liked the puzzles and adventuring design.

== Gameplay ==
The game is a third-person action-adventure, with the player taking the role of an adventurer (either the Amazon "Red Lotus" or the barbarian "Chaindog"), who at the invitation of a wizard explores a series of dungeons and must overcome both monsters and traps to find riches.

== Development ==
Ian Livingstone was heavily involved in determining the game's level design and art style. The aesthetics and atmosphere are manifestly inspired by Italian artist Giovanni Battista Piranesi, whose ruins drawings fascinated Ian Livingstone.

Though the game's 3D engine is very similar to that of Tomb Raider, another Eidos-published game with a development cycle which overlapped that of Deathtrap Dungeon, the two games were developed in isolation.

Livingstone said the character Red Lotus was created as "a combination of all the girls who have caught my eye over the past 20 years. Not all of these girls were real, though. Comic books have had a big influence on her creation."

Deathtrap Dungeon was first publicly shown at E3 1996.

== Release ==
Deathtrap Dungeon was promoted with a racy ad campaign featuring a leather-clad dominatrix.

== Reception ==
Reception

Aggregate score
Aggregator	Score	
Aggregator	PC	PS
GameRankings	64%	54%

Review scores
Publication	Score	
Publication	PC	PS
AllGame	4/5	1.5/5
CNET Gamecenter	4/10	4/10
Computer Games Strategy Plus	2.5/5	N/A
Computer Gaming World	3/5	N/A
Edge	7/10	7/10
Electronic Gaming Monthly	N/A	4.875/10 (Note: Four critics of Electronic Gaming Monthly gave the PlayStation version each a score of 3.5/10, 5/10, 6.5/10, and 4.5/10.)
EP Daily	6/10	N/A
Game Informer	N/A	6.5/10
GameRevolution	B	N/A
GameSpot	6.2/10	3.7/10
IGN	4.7/10	5/10
Next Generation	N/A	1/5
Official U.S. PlayStation Magazine	N/A	2.5/5
PC Accelerator	5/10	N/A
PC Gamer (US)	79%	N/A

Deathtrap Dungeon received mostly negative reviews on both platforms, though the PC version saw a larger share of mixed reviews than the PlayStation version did. Criticisms were levied at the bland environments, overly simplistic puzzles, and weak enemy designs, but reviewers focused most of their attention on the poor control and erratic camera movements. John Davison of Electronic Gaming Monthly elaborated that "In places the camera seems to somersault over your head in a puke-inducing high speed maneuver.", and his co-reviewer Kraig Kujawa said that because of the camera and control issues, "Battles often consist of struggling to turn the right way to face an enemy, and then exchanging random swings until someone crumbles into a heap of blood and body parts."

IGN and GamePro both instead praised the puzzles, and described them as key part of the game's fun. However, while GamePro concluded that the puzzle-solving and adventure overshadowed the game's flaws and made it decent enough to be worth at least trying as a rental, (Note: GamePro gave the PlayStation version 3.5/5 for graphics, 4.0/5 scores for sound, 4.0/5 for fun factor, and 3.0/5 for control.) IGN praised the greater focus on action as compared to Tomb Raider but felt the flaws outweighed the merits and made the game overall unappealing.

Although the Tomb Raider series was the most common point of reference, GameSpot and Next Generation compared Deathtrap Dungeon to its contemporary Blasto. Both publications had given negative reviews to Blasto, and both agreed that Deathtrap Dungeon was the worse of the two games, though GameSpot also commented, "it mirrors [Blasto] in that you can see how it could've turned out to be a good game".

Reviews for the PlayStation version widely criticized the graphics, citing defects such as frequent clipping and visible seams in the textures. IGN said the visuals failed to surpass those of Tomb Raider II, which Eidos released half a year earlier, while GamePro and Next Generation felt they compared unfavorably even to the original Tomb Raider. By contrast, most reviews for the later PC version praised its graphics. These reviews still tended to be overall negative, with IGN concluding that "Unfortunately, good looks aren't nearly enough to make a game worth playing." IGN and GameSpot both additionally criticized the PC version for lacking the ability to save at any point, a standard feature in PC games. GamePro instead said that the PC version was "a solid, if not spectacular, addition to the TR [Tomb Raider] canon and should keep fans of the genre well employed." (Note: GamePro gave the PC version 4.5/5 for graphics, 3/5 for sound, 4/5 for control, and 3.5/5 for fun factor.)

Next Generation concluded that the flaws in the PlayStation original "continually distracted us from the fun parts. Overall, there are only three words for this game – bad, bad, bad." Edge said the PlayStation version "isn't going to seriously challenge Tomb Raider 2's dominance of this genre, but it is a solid, playable and well-designed fantasy romp that will at least pass the time until Lara Croft's next appearance", and later said that the PC version was "certainly worthy of attention".
