= Starship Traveller =

Single-player adventure gamebook

- Original Puffin Books cover (1984)
- Author: Steve Jackson
- Illustrator: Peter Andrew Jones
- Cover artist: Peter Andrew Jones (U.K.); Richard Corben (U.S.)
- Series: Fighting Fantasy (number 4)
- Genre: Science fiction, space opera
- Publisher: Puffin Books
- Publication date: Puffin: 1983; Dell/Laurel-Leaf: 1984
- Media type: Print (Paperback)
- ISBN: 0-14-031637-X
- Preceded by: The Forest of Doom
- Followed by: City of Thieves

Starship Traveller is a single-player adventure gamebook written by Steve Jackson and illustrated by Peter Andrew Jones. Originally published by Puffin Books in 1983, the title is the fourth gamebook in the Fighting Fantasy series. It was later republished by Wizard Books in 2002. A digital version developed by Tin Man Games is available for Android, iOS, Windows 10, MacOS, and Linux.

== Rules ==
This adventure was the first Fighting Fantasy title with a science fiction setting. It was the first title to introduce rules for (phaser) gun combat and (ship-to-ship) spaceship combat, in addition to hand-to-hand combat. The player must also manage the statistics of multiple characters (Captain and crew) and the vessel itself. It is also possible to finish the adventure without having engaged in combat at all.

== Story ==
Starship Traveller is a science-fiction adventure scenario in which the player is captain of the starship Traveller which has been pulled through a black hole, called the Selstian Void, into another universe; the captain must assemble landing parties to explore various planets to find clues to the necessary coordinates that will allows the crew to bring the ship safely back to the Earth of their own universe.

== Reception ==
Marcus L. Rowland reviewed Starship Traveller for the January 1984 issue of White Dwarf, rating the title a 9 out of a possible 10. Rowland noted that this book was "apparently inspired by Star Trek," and that possible events in the game include "capture for gladitorial games, plague, summary execution as an illegal alien, and mutiny".

== In other media ==
A digital version developed by Tin Man Games is available for Android, iOS, Windows 10, MacOS, and Linux.
