= Russ Nicholson =

British illustrator (died 2023)

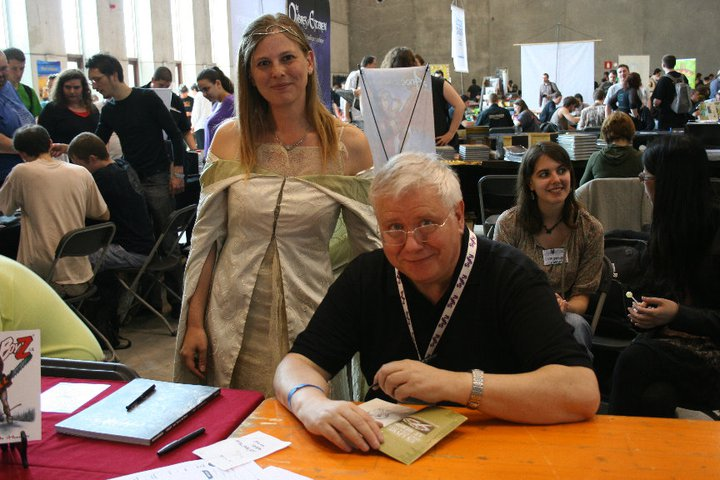
- Nicholson at a book signing session.
- Died: 10 May 2023
- Known for: Fantasy art

Russ Nicholson (died 10 May 2023) was a British illustrator, best known for his black and white fantasy art.

Street scene, Russ Nicholson

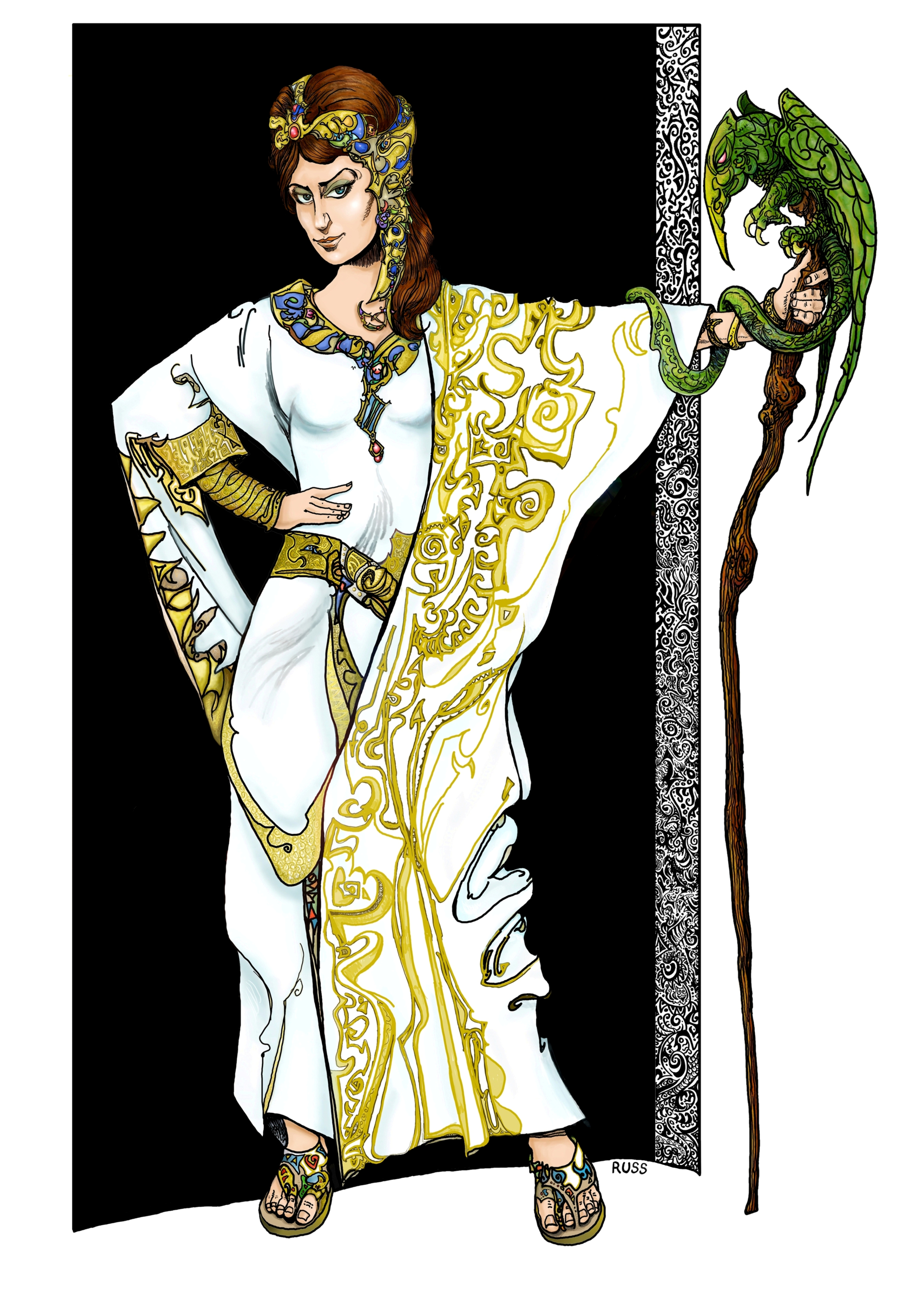
Sorceress, Russ Nicholson, 2011

== Early life and education ==
Nicholson was born in Scotland, and studied at Duncan of Jordanstone College of Art and Design (which later became part of Dundee University). He moved to England in the 1970s where, save for a brief sojourn in Papua New Guinea, he lived for the rest of his life.

== Career ==
Following graduation, Nicholson became a freelance illustrator, but found "the work was meagre, so I had to find a weekly paying job, this came in the form of an advertising sweatshop (so to speak) in London, with very little money. It was not the best of times." In order to survive, Nicholson took post-graduate training in order to become an art teacher and art college lecturer, which became his full time occupation for much of his life.

=== Fantasy artist ===
Nicholson became an important contributor to early fantasy game-related titles such as The Warlock of Firetop Mountain, the first in the illustrated series of Fighting Fantasy game books by Steve Jackson and Ian Livingstone. As the Fighting Fantasy series grew in popularity, he illustrated sixteen more books in the series. He also illustrated many creatures in the Fiend Folio, the original UK contribution to the first edition of Advanced Dungeons and Dragons.

He illustrated the six original published "episodes" of the Fabled Lands created by Dave Morris and Jamie Thomson, and in 2015 also to the 7th episode "The Serpent King's Domain" (written 20 years after the original entries). He also lent his distinctive style to numerous Games Workshop products, including Warhammer Fantasy Battle, Warhammer Fantasy Roleplay, Warhammer 40,000 and in their house magazine White Dwarf.

For over forty years Nicholson produced work for a wide range of companies and publishers, including Puffin, Pan, Collins, Hodder and Stoughton, TSR, Games Workshop, Hoggshead Publishing, DC Thomson, Le Grimoire and Scriptarium. His work has been reproduced in over twenty countries. In addition, he drew the album cover (False Weavers) for Santa Cruz anarcho-folk punk band, Blackbird Raum.

From 2011 to 2020, Nicholson regularly published The Gallery: Art of Russ Nicholson, an illustrated blog of his work including explanations of his creative processes.

== Death ==
Nicholson died on 10 May 2023.
