= Warlock (magazine) =

British magazine

- Cover of Warlock magazine #3 (1984). Art by Terry Oakes.
- Editor: Various
- Categories: Adventure gamebook
- Frequency: Quarterly then bimonthly
- First issue: 1984
- Final issue Number: December 1986; 13
- Company: Penguin (#1–5); Games Workshop (#6–13)
- Country: United Kingdom

Warlock was a British magazine published by Penguin Books and game manufacturer Games Workshop between 1984 and 1986. The primary focus of the magazine was fantasy, with emphasis on the Fighting Fantasy adventure gamebook series.

== Publication history ==
The magazine was established by Fighting Fantasy creators Steve Jackson and Ian Livingstone, running for 13 issues from 1984 until December 1986. Jackson and Livingstone were the editors until issue 10 and then editors-in-chief, with Marc Gascoigne as editor. The desk editor for the first five issues was Philippa Dickinson. Warlock was published in the United Kingdom, Australia, and New Zealand. A Japanese edition of the magazine was expanded to a general RPG publication where the title had an extended run before ceasing publication in 1997.

Regular features included announcements, cartoons, competitions, interviews, maps of the Fighting Fantasy world, mini-adventures including abbreviated versions of Caverns of the Snow Witch and House of Hell with different artwork, a monster bestiary (becoming the basis for the Fighting Fantasy title Out of the Pit) and miniature figure tutorials.

== Mini-adventures ==
Issue	Title	Author(s)	Illustrator(s)	Sections	Published
1	The Warlock of Firetop Mountain: Part I	Steve Jackson and Ian Livingstone	Russ Nicholson	273	1984
2	The Warlock of Firetop Mountain: Part II	Steve Jackson and Ian Livingstone	Russ Nicholson	127	1984
2	Caverns of the Snow Witch	Ian Livingstone	Duncan Smith	190	1984
3	The House of Hell	Steve Jackson	Tim Sell	185	1984
4	The Dervish Stone	Paul Struth	Tim Sell	200	1985
5	Dungeon of Justice	Jonathan Ford	John Blanche and Bob Harvey	200	1985
6	The Dark Chronicles of Anakendis	Andrew Whitworth	Mark Dunn, Bill Houston and Trevor Hammond	200	1985
7	The Temple of Testing	A. E. Arkle	John Glentoran	200	1985
8	The Floating City	Ruth Pracy	Pete Martin	200	1986
9	Fortress Throngard	Tom Williams	Leo Hartas	172	1986
10	Rogue Mage	Graeme Davis	Tony Ackland and Pete Martin	200	1986
11	The Land of Changes	Ruth Pracy	Pete Martin	200	1986
12	Deadline to Destruction	Gavin Shute	David Stevens	200	1986
13	The Temple of the Pharoah	Tom Williams	Dave Carson	194	1986

== Reviews ==
- Imagine #15
