= The Warlock of Firetop Mountain =

1982 adventure gamebook

- Cover of the first edition
- Authors: Steve Jackson; Ian Livingstone
- Illustrator: Russ Nicholson
- Cover artist: Puffin: Peter Andrew Jones; Wizard: Martin McKenna
- Series: Fighting Fantasy: Puffin number: 1; Wizard number: 1
- Genre: Fantasy
- Publication date: Puffin: 1982; Dell/Laurel-Leaf: 1983; Wizard: 2002
- Media type: Print (Paperback)
- ISBN: 0-14-031538-1 (Puffin); ISBN 1-84046-387-2 (Wizard)
- Followed by: The Citadel of Chaos

The Warlock of Firetop Mountain is a single-player adventure gamebook written by Steve Jackson and Ian Livingstone, and illustrated by Russ Nicholson. Originally published by Puffin Books in 1982, the title is the first gamebook in the Fighting Fantasy series. It was later republished by Wizard Books in 2002, and Scholastic Books in 2017. As well as launching the Fighting Fantasy series, the gamebook inspired two direct sequels and five novels, and has been adapted into a board game, an audio drama and a video game.

== Publication history ==
In 1980, Steve Jackson and Ian Livingstone attended a Games Day, and after meeting with a Penguin editor, Philippa Dickinson, decided to create a series of single-player gamebooks. Their first submission, The Magic Quest, was a short adventure intended to demonstrate the style of game. The Magic Quest was eventually accepted by Penguin Books, although the authors devoted a further six months to expanding and improving upon the original concept.

The result was The Warlock of Firetop Mountain, and after several rewrites, the book was accepted and published in 1982 under Penguin's children's imprint, Puffin Books. The original cover of the book was illustrated by Peter Andrew Jones, with the interior illustrations by Russ Nicholson. Jackson and Livingstone approved all artwork. Philippa Dickinson commissioned two more books in the same series.

The title, like the game books that followed in the Fighting Fantasy series, distinguished itself by featuring a fantasy role-playing element, with the caption on each cover reading "a Fighting Fantasy gamebook in which YOU become the hero!" Uncertain as to how popular such a new and untried concept might prove to be, Penguin ran a first printing of just 5,000 copies. These quickly sold out, leading Penguin to do additional print runs.

The success of the Fighting Fantasy series (distribution in over 17 countries) allowed for numerous reprints of the original title, although the cover of subsequent versions changed due to deliberate redesign, printing errors, and releases in different markets. When the franchise was acquired by Wizard Books in 2002, the title (as with others in the series) was the first to be reprinted, again with a completely different cover, the rationale being that the old cover did not suit the modern market.

In 2007 Wizard Books released a special 25th anniversary edition, which included supplementary material. The cover for this edition had the original picture from the 1982 edition. In 2009 Wizard Books released another edition of the original book, with yet another new cover.

In 2017 Scholastic Books began publishing Fighting Fantasy books, and released a new edition of The Warlock of Firetop Mountain with new interior art as well as a new cover.

In 1984 the book was reprinted in the first two issues of Warlock magazine, with a different solution to the keys puzzle at the end and therefore a different route through the mountain.

== Plot ==
The Warlock of Firetop Mountain is a fantasy adventure scenario involving a quest for "an untold wealth of treasure" of a warlock in a dungeon.

The player takes the role of an adventurer travelling to find the treasure of a powerful Warlock, hidden deep within Firetop Mountain. People from a nearby village advise that the treasure is stored in a chest with two locks, and that the keys are guarded by various creatures within the dungeons. The player must then navigate the dungeons beneath Firetop Mountain, battle monsters and attempt to locate the keys.

== Reception ==
Nicholas J R Dougan reviewed The Warlock of Firetop Mountain for White Dwarf #36, giving it an overall rating of 10 out of 10, and stated that "The book would make an ideal present for anyone who has expressed an interest in role-playing games, or indeed any young brother (or sister!). I imagine that the minimum age would be about ten, but I would recommend it to novice and veteran players alike for quite a few hours of entertainment."

In the inaugural issue of The Games Machine, John Woods found that random chance played too great a part in the game, saying, "At several points a single wrong guess or unlucky dice roll spells doom for your character, and success often comes in an equally arbitrary fashion. There is little feeling of player skill having any influence on the outcome."

The Warlock of Firetop Mountain was chosen for inclusion in Hobby Games: The 100 Best. Chris Pramas commented that the book "was a pioneering release that popularized the solo gamebook and successfully brought the roleplaying game experience to a wider audience. This book alone sold over two million copies and it was only the first of the Fighting Fantasy series. The Warlock of Firetop Mountain spawned 58 more Fighting Fantasy books in the original series, a support magazine, a board game, an ambitious spinoff series, several computer games, two traditional roleplaying games, and a series of fantasy novels. Then there was the legion of imitators, another sure sign of success. Not bad for a slim paperback less than 200 pages long."

In a retrospective review of The Warlock of Firetop Mountain in Black Gate, Matthew David Surridge said "Modern games are more forgiving than Warlock, I think. Still, all in all, I think the book format may be best: there's a certain effect the mix of image and text gives you that I can't imagine in other formats. All told, I'm glad I picked the book up again. There's magic in Firetop Mountain yet."

== Other reviews ==
- White Dwarf #83
- Review by Julia Margaret Meyers (1984) in Fantasy Review, August 1984
- Review by Jonathan Green (2012) in SFX, September 2012
- Jeux & Stratégie #26

== Sequels ==
The title was followed by two sequels, one written by Ian Livingstone. The first, Return to Firetop Mountain (the 50th title in the Fighting Fantasy series), was published in 1992 to celebrate the 10th anniversary of the franchise. The second sequel, Legend of Zagor (the 54th title in the series), was written by Carl Sargent although it was credited to Livingstone. It differed from traditional gameplay in that the player could choose one of four characters. Sargent also wrote The Zagor Chronicles, which were also partly credited to Livingstone. It was a series of four novels published from 1993 to 1994. The warlock Zagor also appeared in the first Fighting Fantasy novel, The Trolltooth Wars (1989), by Steve Jackson.

== In other media ==
A ZX Spectrum video game based on the book was released by Crystal Computing in 1984.

The Warlock of Firetop Mountain boardgame, designed by Steve Jackson, was released in 1986 by Games Workshop. The game is based on the book, and players must navigate a maze and overcome monsters in a bid to be the first to open the Warlock's treasure chest.

The gamebook was also converted into a 40-page d20 System role-playing adventure by Jamie Wallis. It was published by Myriador in 2003 and reissued in pdf format by Greywood Publishing in 2008.

In 2009, Big Blue Bubble released an action-RPG for the Nintendo DS titled Fighting Fantasy: The Warlock of Firetop Mountain and based on the original title. In 2010, an electronic version of the title was released for the iPhone and iPad. When Big Blue Bubble later lost the license, all its apps were withdrawn. This gamebook has later been released by Tin Man Games.

On 10 February 2011 an Amazon Kindle edition of the title was launched by UK developer Worldweaver Ltd and in September 2011 a PSP and PlayStation 3 version was announced by UK developer Laughing Jackal.

On 30 October 2015 the Australian game developers Tin Man Games launched a Kickstarter project to develop a video game based on the book, which was released in 2016.

The gamebook was adapted into a role-playing adventure for the Advanced Fighting Fantasy system by Brett Schofield for Arion Games in 2016.

In July 2017 the British audio company FoxYason Music Productions, known for their work with Big Finish Productions, announced that they had obtained the licence to make an original audio drama based on The Warlock of Firetop Mountain. Sub-titled 'The Hero's Quest' the drama is written by David N. Smith and directed by Richard Fox and features many of the characters and locations from the original gamebook. The drama was released in September 2017 and features Toby Longworth as Zagor, Rachel Atkins as Vale Moonwing and Tim Treloar as Cassius Stormblade.
