= Iain McCaig =

American artist, writer, and filmmaker (born 1957)

- Born: 1957 (age 68–69); Santa Monica, California
- Occupations: Artist, writer, and filmmaker

Iain McCaig (born March 19, 1957) is an American artist. He has produced art and designs for many Hollywood films, including the Star Wars franchise, Terminator 2 and Hook. He designed Padme Amidala and Darth Maul for The Phantom Menace.

Early in his career he painted an album cover for Jethro Tull's The Broadsword and the Beast and the cover for the Fighting Fantasy book, Forest of Doom.

== Biography ==
McCaig was born in Santa Monica, California, but spent most of his younger years in Victoria, British Columbia, Canada. He later moved to Great Britain and attended the Glasgow School of Art, but returned one summer to California to work at Korty Films, where he contributed to Sesame Street cartoons and a trailer for the 1983 animated film Twice Upon a Time.

Returning to the UK, he began a career as a freelance illustrator; his work there includes the cover for Jethro Tull's The Broadsword and the Beast, the design of the Games Workshop logo and cover and interior illustrations for Ian Livingstone's 'Fighting Fantasy' books. In 1990, he returned to California to work for Industrial Light and Magic and later for Lucasfilm. During that time, he directed his first professional film, a 1998 short called The Face, which won multiple awards, including the Year 2000 Notable Video from the American Library Association.

McCaig designed the Star Wars characters Padmé Amidala and Darth Maul and has contributed key designs to many of the films in the Star Wars franchise, including Episodes I, II, III, and VII.

Among his other credits are Terminator 2, Hook, Interview with the Vampire, Bram Stoker's Dracula, Charlotte's Web, Peter Pan, Harry Potter and the Goblet of Fire, The Spiderwick Chronicles, John Carter of Mars, The Avengers, Guardians of the Galaxy, and The Jungle Book. He was also Co-Producer and Concept Design Director on Outlander.

In October 2008, a book of McCaig's work, Shadowline: The Art of Iain McCaig, was released. The book is a combination of mini-art classes, an allegorical novella on McCaig's creative process, and a retrospective of 28 years of his film and personal work.

McCaig has taught drawing and storytelling publicly and privately for most of his career. He is the author of four DVDs on Visual Storytelling and Concept Design for the Gnomon Workshop. In 2014, McCaig received the Spectrum Award for Grand Master.

== Personal life ==
McCaig's daughter, Mishi is also a film artist, having contributed to Iron Man, Outlander and John Carter of Mars, as well as producing her own short film work. Iain and Mishi were both involved in the production of the Discovery Channel series Dinosaur Revolution. His son, Inigo, is also an artist.

McCaig currently lives in Victoria, British Columbia, with his wife, Leonor.
