= Fighting Fantasy =

Roleplaying gamebook

- The 25th anniversary edition of The Warlock of Firetop Mountain, originally published in 1982 and the first in the Fighting Fantasy series
- Designers: Ian Livingstone, Steve Jackson
- Publishers: Puffin, Wizard Books
- Publication: 1982
- Genres: Fantasy
- Systems: Gamebook

Fighting Fantasy is a series of single-player role-playing gamebooks created by Steve Jackson and Ian Livingstone. The first volume in the series was published in paperback by Puffin in 1982.

The series distinguished itself by mixing Choose Your Own Adventure–style storytelling with a dice-based role-playing element included within the books themselves. The caption on many of the covers claimed each title was an adventure "in which YOU are the hero!" The majority of the titles followed a fantasy theme, although science fiction, post-apocalyptic, superhero, and modern horror gamebooks were also published. The popularity of the series led to the creation of merchandise such as action figures, board games, role-playing game systems, magazines, novels, and video games.

Puffin ended the series in 1995, but the rights to the series were eventually purchased by Wizard Books in 2002. Wizard published new editions of the original books and also commissioned six new books over two series, ending in 2012. The rights were then acquired by Scholastic in 2017, which has since published four new titles and reissued thirteen of the original books with new artwork.

== Overview ==
The main text of each gamebook does not progress in a linear fashion, but rather is divided into a series of numbered sections (usually 400, though a few are shorter or longer). Beginning at the first section, the reader typically must pick one of a series of options provided by the text, each option being detailed at a separate non-sequential numbered section (e.g. the reader may be presented with a choice to turn from section 1 directly to either section 83 or section 180) which in turn provides an outcome for the option chosen. The book continues in this fashion until their character is killed in combat, is stopped by the story, or completes the story. "Fighting Fantasy gamebooks empower the reader, who felt the anxiety or joy of being fantasy heroes themselves – they lived or died by their decisions. And if at first you don't succeed, try and try again," said Ian Livingstone of the format.

The typical Fighting Fantasy gamebook tasks players with completing a quest. A successful play usually ends with the player reaching the final numbered section of the book. In some cases this can only be achieved by obtaining various story items (e.g. gems in Deathtrap Dungeon); many of the titles only feature one path to the solution.

All Fighting Fantasy gamebooks are illustrated, including full-page pieces and smaller, repeated images scattered throughout the book as breaks or space fillers between sections. Regular contributors (excluding Scholastic editions) included Les Edwards, Terry Oakes, Russ Nicholson, Leo Hartas, Ian Miller, John Blanche, Martin McKenna, and Iain McCaig.

=== System ===
Each Fighting Fantasy gamebook requires the reader to create their character, randomly assigning scores to three statistics (skill, stamina, and luck). These, in conjunction with rolling six-sided dice, are used to resolve skill challenges and the combat sections. Some titles use additional statistics or conflict resolution mechanics; most also require the reader to keep an inventory of items.

=== Setting ===
Most early Fighting Fantasy titles were set in locations later revealed to be on the same continent called Allansia. Later a whole world named Titan was developed, with subsequent gamebooks set on three main continents—Allansia, Khul and the Old World. Other titles are set in unrelated fantasy, horror, modern day, and sci-fi environments.

== Publication history ==
In 1980, Steve Jackson (not to be confused with the US-based game designer of the same name) and Ian Livingstone attended a Games Day, and after meeting with a Penguin Books editor Geraldine Cook decided to create a series of single-player gamebooks. Their first submission, The Magic Quest, was a short adventure intended to demonstrate the style of game. The Magic Quest was eventually accepted by Penguin, although the authors devoted a further six months to expanding and improving upon their original concept.

=== Puffin Books (1982–1995) ===
The result was The Warlock of Firetop Mountain and, after several rewrites, the book was accepted and published in 1982 under Penguin's children's imprint, Puffin Books. Following the success of this title, Jackson and Livingstone began writing individually to create additional Fighting Fantasy gamebooks.

This series was published under Puffin's newly-created Adventure Gamebooks banner, which eventually would hold not only the Fighting Fantasy series, but The Cretan Chronicles trilogy, the Starlight Adventures series, and the individual role-playing game Maelstrom as well.

In 1983, The Citadel of Chaos and The Forest of Doom were published, by Jackson and Livingstone respectively. Four more titles quickly followed: Starship Traveller (the first title with a science fiction setting), City of Thieves, Deathtrap Dungeon, and Island of the Lizard King; Jackson writing one and Livingstone writing three. In 1984, a decision was made to hire additional writers to expand the series more quickly: Steve Jackson (the U.S.-based founder and owner of Steve Jackson Games) was the first, followed by others such as Andrew Chapman, Carl Sargent (aka Keith Martin), Marc Gascoigne, and Peter Darvill-Evans. Jackson and Livingstone, however, continued to be involved and approved all cover and internal illustrations within the UK.

Jackson wrote a self-contained four-part series titled Steve Jackson's Sorcery! (1983-1985), which combined the use of combat and sorcery, and introduced the continent later known as the Old World. These featured dice images at the bottom of each page, making it possible for the player to randomly flip through the pages for the equivalent of a dice roll (the Fighting Fantasy titles published by Wizard Books used the same device).

Andrew Chapman and Martin Allen also wrote a two-book, two-player adventure titled Clash of the Princes (1986). There were also several supplemental books produced that provided more information about the Fighting Fantasy universe, including a comprehensive bestiary of monsters and a sample adventure.

Although the Fighting Fantasy titles had successful sales the increasing dominance of video games in the 1990s caused a gradual decline. The series was scheduled to conclude with Return to Firetop Mountain (book 50, Livingstone, 1992), but due to strong sales of that volume, ten more books were scheduled. Nine were published, the series ending with Curse of the Mummy (1995). Bloodbones, the tenth scheduled title (meant to have been book 60 in the series) was cancelled, but was eventually published by Wizard Books as part of their later reprinting efforts.

=== Wizard Books ===
==== Series 1 (2002–2007) ====
In 2002, Wizard Books acquired the rights to the Fighting Fantasy series and reprinted many of the original titles in a revised order (initially only the gamebooks actually written by Jackson and/or Livingstone were published), starting with The Warlock of Firetop Mountain. They also incorporated the Sorcery! miniseries, as books 9, 11, 13, and 15. A new title, Eye of the Dragon (by Ian Livingstone) was released in 2005, followed by Bloodbones in 2006 and Howl of the Werewolf in 2007. This series used a new logo, the rationale being that the old covers did not suit the modern market.

2007 also marked the twenty-fifth anniversary of Fighting Fantasy, and to commemorate the event Wizard Books published a special hardcover edition of The Warlock of Firetop Mountain that used the original 1982 cover image and contained extra material such as the dungeon solution and a commentary on Fighting Fantasy by Livingstone. This series concluded that same year, ending with 29 books.

==== Series 2 (2009–2012) ====
Wizard Books then began again with a new series of reprints in 2009, again featuring a different cover art style, and again starting with The Warlock of Firetop Mountain. These books were physically larger than prior releases, being produced in B-format (like the original Advanced Fighting Fantasy volumes). Three other original titles were added during this run, including Blood of the Zombies by Ian Livingstone to celebrate the thirtieth anniversary in 2012. This series was 17 books long, although Blood of the Zombies, the last volume released, is unnumbered and packaged differently than the rest.

=== Scholastic Books (2017–) ===
A new Fighting Fantasy book by Livingstone, The Port of Peril, was published in August 2017 by Scholastic in celebration of the 35th anniversary of the series. Scholastic also released five of the original books. Instead of reusing the original artwork or its style, Scholastic commissioned new artwork. In April 2018, a further six titles were published, including a new adventure by author Charlie Higson, entitled The Gates of Death. Three more titles were published in September 2019, including Livingstone's new adventure Assassins of Allansia. In October 2020, two new titles were published, including a new adventure entitled Crystal of Storms, the first in the series by a female author, Rhianna Pratchett. In September 2022, two more new titles were published, one by Steve Jackson (Secrets of Salamonis) and one by Ian Livingstone (Shadow of the Giants), in celebration of the series' 40th anniversary. In September 2024, a new title by Ian Livingstone, The Dungeon on Blood Island, was released.

=== United States ===
Fighting Fantasy was published in the United States by Laurel Leaf, an imprint of Dell Publishing, beginning in November of 1983. These U.S. versions featured a new cover design, with the first eleven books using a white background for their covers and books 12 through 21 using a black background. Initially these editions had new cover illustrations by Richard Corben (books 1 through 7) and Richard Courtney (books 8 through 13), until 1986 when with Temple of Terror (book 14) the original Puffin Books cover illustration were used till the range ended with book 21, Trial of Champions. During this run, House of Hell was re-titled House of Hades.

In October 2003, iBooks of New York began republishing the books, beginning with the first two (The Warlock of Firetop Mountain and The Citadel of Chaos). iBooks filled for Chapter 7 bankruptcy in February 2006.

In October 2024, Steve Jackson Games announced that it had secured the U.S. rights to publish Fighting Fantasy, with the first books scheduled to appear in "early 2025" in two waves of five books each.

== Other media ==
=== Printed ===
Warlock magazine (first published by Puffin Books and later Games Workshop) provided additional information on the Fighting Fantasy universe, and each issue featured a short gamebook adventure, new rules, monsters, reviews and comic strips. It was published from 1983 to 1986 and ran for 13 issues in the UK. It was also published in other countries, and continued in Japan until 1997.

In 1984, Jackson published a roleplaying game, Fighting Fantasy – The Introductory Role-playing Game. A second game was published in 1989: Advanced Fighting Fantasy (AFF). AFF was re-released as a new and further expanded edition by Arion Games in 2011.

In 1985, Jackson wrote a picture gamebook with the title Tasks of Tantalon, in which the player was required to solve a series of puzzles which were presented as large, full-colour pictures containing hidden clues to be located and assembled.

The Warlock of Firetop Mountain (1986) and Legend of Zagor (1993) were released as board games by Games Workshop and Parker Brothers respectively.

Between 1989 and 1994, seven novels were published based on Fighting Fantasy, written by Steve Jackson, Marc Gascoigne, Ian Livingstone, and Carl Sargent.

In 1992, the Fighting Fantasy 10th Anniversary Yearbook (a diary with articles, trivia and a gamebook) was published.

In 2003, Jamie Wallis (not to be confused with James Wallis) adapted eight Fighting Fantasy and Sorcery! gamebooks to the d20 System. These adventures were published by Myriador (now defunct, though PDFs are still available for purchase from Greywood Publishing via third-party online retailers).

A comic series based on Freeway Fighter was published by Titan Comics in May 2017.

=== Audio ===
In September 2017, a series of audio dramas based on classic Fighting Fantasy titles was launched by FoxYason Productions at Fighting Fantasy Fest 2, starting with The Warlock of Firetop Mountain: The Hero's Quest. A boxset of four more titles was released in 2018.

=== Video games ===
Several Fighting Fantasy titles have been released as video games, including seven Fighting Fantasy titles (The Warlock of Firetop Mountain, The Citadel of Chaos, The Forest of Doom, Temple of Terror, Seas of Blood, Appointment with F.E.A.R. and Rebel Planet) for the Commodore 64, Amstrad CPC, BBC, and Sinclair ZX Spectrum and Deathtrap Dungeon for the PC and PlayStation by Eidos Interactive (1998). On 18 August 2011 an adaption of Talisman of Death was released by UK developer Laughing Jackal for the PlayStation Minis platform (playable on the PlayStation Portable and PlayStation 3).

Cambridge-based studio Inkle released another interactive version of The Shamutanti Hills for iOS in May 2013, and has since gone on to release all four parts of Sorcery! on iOS, Android, Windows and Mac.

The video game The Warlock of Firetop Mountain: Goblin Scourge Edition was released by Tin Man Games for the Nintendo Switch on 13 September 2018.

Tin Man Games has also released the Fighting Fantasy Classics video game for Windows. Bloodbones is available for free and other titles are available as paid DLC.

Nomad Games released Deathtrap Dungeon Trilogy for the Nintendo Switch in 2019.

=== Mobile ===
On 5 December 2006, it was announced that Jackson and Livingstone were planning to release a new series of handheld games based on Fighting Fantasy for Nintendo DS and Sony's PSP. The first of these, Fighting Fantasy: The Warlock of Firetop Mountain, was released for the DS in the United States on 25 November 2009, and for the Apple iPhone and iPod in early January 2010.

On 10 February 2011 an Amazon Kindle edition of The Warlock of Firetop Mountain was launched by UK developer Worldweaver Ltd, for the US market. Warlock and four other gamebooks were released on iOS by Big Blue Bubble, but were removed from the app store in 2012 when they lost the licence.

Australian game developers Tin Man Games have since published several iOS and Android versions of Fighting Fantasy books, including Blood of the Zombies, House of Hell, Forest of Doom, Island of the Lizard King and Starship Traveller, and an iOS version of the first part of the Sorcery! series was released by Bright Al Ltd in 2010.

Inkle's Sorcery! series is available on iOS, Android, Windows and Mac.

== Reception ==
In March 1983, the top three entries of the Sunday Times bestseller list were occupied by Fighting Fantasy books. The series sold 20 million copies in the 80s and 90s.

Fighting Fantasy was ranked 47th in the 1996 reader poll of Arcane magazine to determine the 50 most popular roleplaying games of all time. The UK magazine's editor Paul Pettengale commented: "To say that it is basic would be a huge understatement – Fighting Fantasy has just a couple of stats from which a character is created, and combat is a simple case of rolling six-sided dice, pitching one creature's stats against another. It's fun, quick and easy, which explains its popularity."

=== Moral panic ===
The books were published with illustrations from Games Workshop which, though something Puffin was resistant to accept, Ian Livingstone credits as part of the series' success. However, partially as a result of the covers, the game, along with Dungeons & Dragons, became the subject of a moral panic. The Evangelical Alliance issued a warning that the books would lead to players interacting with the devil, while parents reported that after reading their children developed supernatural powers, including one mother who reported that her child started to fly. When asked about the controversy, Jackson replied that they were very grateful for it, as it helped their sales figures. Game historian Stu Horvath commented "The moral panic didn't dent sales. The Warlock of Firetop Mountain and the Fighting Fantasy series proved to be a massive on-ramp for bringing new players into the RPG hobby, particularly in the British commonwealth ... Firetop Mountain alone was reprinted five times in 1982, ten times in 1983, and seven more in 1984, eventually selling well over two million copies and inspiring a popular board game to boot."

== Reviews ==
- Isaac Asimov's Science Fiction Magazine
- Świat Gier Komputerowych #64 (Polish)

== See also ==
- List of Fighting Fantasy gamebooks
- F.I.S.T. – telephone-based single-player roleplaying game developed by Jackson and similar in many ways to Fighting Fantasy
