= Steve Jackson (British game designer) =

British game designer (born 1951)

- Born: 20 May 1951 (age 75); Altrincham, England
- Education: Keele University (1968–1972)
- Occupations: Fantasy author, entrepreneur, game designer, writer, game reviewer
- Known for: Co-creator, Fighting Fantasy gamebooks; Co-founder, Games Workshop; Co-founder, Lionhead Studios

Steve Jackson (born 20 May 1951) is a British game designer, writer, game reviewer and co-founder of UK game publisher Games Workshop.

== History ==
Steve Jackson began his career in games in 1974 as a freelance journalist with Games & Puzzles magazine. In early 1975, Jackson co-founded the company Games Workshop with school friends John Peake and Ian Livingstone. They started publishing with the monthly newsletter, Owl and Weasel, on which Jackson did most of the writing. They sent copies of the first issue to subscribers of the Albion fanzine; Brian Blume, co-partner of American publisher TSR, received one of these copies and in return sent back a copy of TSR's new game Dungeons & Dragons. Jackson and Livingstone felt that this game was more imaginative than any other contemporary games being produced in the UK, and so worked out an arrangement with Blume for an exclusive deal to sell D&D in Europe. In late 1975, Jackson and Livingstone organized their first convention, the initial Games Day. While selling game products directly from their flat, their landlord evicted them in summer 1976 after people kept going there looking for a physical store. By 1978 the first Games Workshop store had opened, in London.

At a Games Day convention in 1980 Jackson and Livingstone met Geraldine Cooke, an editor at Penguin Books. They persuaded her to consider publication of a book about the role-playing hobby. This was originally intended to be an introductory guide, but the idea of an interactive gamebook seemed more appealing. After several months Cooke decided that this was viable and commissioned Jackson and Livingstone to develop it. In 1980, Jackson and Livingstone began to develop the concept of the Fighting Fantasy gamebook series, the first volume of which (The Warlock of Firetop Mountain) was published in 1982 by Puffin Books (a subsidiary imprint of Penguin). Jackson and Livingstone would go on to individually write many volumes each, with further authors adding even more. Steve Jackson notably wrote Sorcery!, a four-part series utilizing the same system as Fighting Fantasy but where Fighting Fantasy mainly targeted children, Steve Jackson's Sorcery! was marketed to an older audience. Jackson and Livingstone attributed the gamebooks' popularity to their difficulty.

After the success of the Fighting Fantasy series, Jackson designed the first interactive telephone role-playing game, FIST, which was based loosely on the concepts of the gamebooks. Jackson and Livingstone sold their Games Workshop stake in 1991. In the mid-1990s Jackson spent 2.5 years as a games journalist with the London Daily Telegraph. He then set up computer games developer Lionhead Studios with Peter Molyneux. Jackson left Lionhead in 2006 when Microsoft bought the company. He is an honorary professor at Brunel University in London, where he teaches the Digital Games Theory and Design MA.

He is often mistaken for the American game designer with the same name. The American Jackson wrote three books in the Fighting Fantasy series, which adds to the confusion, especially as these books were simply credited to "Steve Jackson" without any acknowledgement that it was a different person.

== Works ==
=== Books ===
- The Warlock of Firetop Mountain (1982) with Ian Livingstone, Puffin Books
- Sorcery! 1–4 (1983–85), Puffin Books
- The Citadel of Chaos (1983), Puffin Books
- Starship Traveller (1984), Puffin Books
- House of Hell (1984), Puffin Books
- Fighting Fantasy: The Introductory Role-playing Game (1984), Puffin Books
- Appointment with F.E.A.R. (1985), Puffin Books
- The Tasks of Tantalon (1985), Oxford University Press
- Creature of Havoc (1986), Puffin Books
- The Trolltooth Wars (1989), Puffin Books
- Secrets of Salamonis (2022), Scholastic

=== Video games ===
- Lost Eden (1995), Virgin Interactive
- Close Combat: Invasion – Normandy (2000), Strategic Simulations, Inc.
- Fighting Fantasy: The Warlock of Firetop Mountain (2001), Laughing Jackal
- The Movies (Premiere Edition) (2005), Activision
- Fighting Fantasy: The Warlock of Firetop Mountain (2009), Big Blue Bubble
- Sorcery! 1 – The Shamutanti Hills (2013), Inkle
- Sorcery! 2 – Kharé – Cityport of Traps (2013), Inkle
- Sorcery! 3 – The Seven Serpents (2015), Inkle
- Sorcery! 4 – The Crown Of Kings (2016), Inkle

=== Other ===
- BattleCards – a card game first published in 1993 that features a unique scratch-and-slay system
- Fantasy Interactive Scenarios by Telephone (F.I.S.T.) – a telephone-based single-player roleplaying game similar to Fighting Fantasy
