= Don Turnbull (game designer) =

British role-playing game designer and journalist

- Born: Preston, Lancashire, UK
- Died: Ribble Valley, Lancashire, UK
- Occupations: Journalist, editor, game designer
- Writing career
- Period: 1965–2003
- Genres: Wargaming, board games and role-playing games

Don Turnbull was a journalist, editor, games designer, and an accomplished piano and pinball player. He was particularly instrumental in introducing Dungeons & Dragons into the UK, both as the managing director of TSR UK Ltd and as the editor of the Fiend Folio.

== Early career ==
In his early career Turnbull was as a high-school teacher of mathematics in the north of England. However, he was an early and enthusiastic follower of wargaming, subsequently winning awards as a designer. A feature which assisted his work as a game developer was the use of correspondence to run board games.

== Albion magazine ==
In July 1969 he published the first issue of Albion magazine, one of the first European games fanzines, supporting correspondence play of the board game Diplomacy. Although it only had a few subscribers, Albion was influential and ran to fifty issues. In 1974 it won the Charles S. Roberts Award for Best Amateur Wargaming Magazine. It was an informal publication that provided games reviews and gave an account of ongoing games. In October 1970, Turnbull started another zine, Courier, which was used to discuss the active correspondence games, with Albion turning into a review magazine, covering a range of board and war games. After Albion ended in 1975, Steve Jackson and Ian Livingstone of Games Workshop sent copies of their first issue of Owl and Weasel to the subscribers of Albion to get their business. After pioneering work with Diplomacy, Turnbull began to write for the magazine Games & Puzzles, before becoming involved with the new role-playing games such as Dungeons & Dragons.

== White Dwarf and Games Workshop ==
Turnbull was a contributor to Owl and Weasel and one of the founding contributors to the magazine White Dwarf. This influential magazine did much to develop role-playing games in the UK. His first contribution to White Dwarf was the "Monstermark" system, a way of assessing the relative strength of monsters that might be encountered in a role-playing world. He quickly became a regular reviewer and by issue six was the editor of a regular feature, "The Fiend Factory", which presented descriptions of monsters that readers had created for themselves. In these early issues he published sections from his own "Greenlands" dungeon. After his work for Games Workshop, Don was employed by Gary Gygax to manage the UK operations of TSR, Inc.

== TSR UK Ltd ==
TSR hired Turnbull to edit a second book of monsters, which he named the Fiend Folio, after "The Fiend Factory" monster column from White Dwarf, where many of the book's monsters first appeared. Games Workshop negotiated a deal with TSR in 1979 to put this book together by compiling content from the "Fiend Factory" and other British publications. It was published in 1981 by TSR UK Ltd. Like its companion volume the Monster Manual, the Fiend Folio provided a listing of creatures that player characters could encounter as part of the first edition of the Advanced Dungeons & Dragons game system. It was the pages of the Fiend Folio that introduced a wider audience to the githyanki, the grell and many others.

TSR founded TSR UK in 1980, and Turnbull led this new undertaking. In his role as managing director of TSR UK Ltd, he oversaw the publication of a range of titles, including his own "Underwater" modules in conjunction with Dave J. Browne: The Sinister Secret of Saltmarsh, Danger at Dunwater, and The Final Enemy. These have been described as having "probably one of the best storylines of any module series." These early TSR UK adventures U1–U3 (1981–1983) were incorporated into the Greyhawk setting after the publication of the World of Greyhawk Fantasy Game Setting (1980). The Sinister Secret of Saltmarsh was elected the 27th-greatest D&D adventure of all time by the official D&D magazine Dragon.

TSR UK also produced the "UK" series of modules: UK1 Beyond the Crystal Cave by Dave Brown, Tom Kirby, and Graeme Morris; UK2 The Sentinel by Graeme Morris; UK3 The Gauntlet by Graeme Morris; UK4 When a Star Falls by Graeme Morris; UK5 Eye of the Serpent by Graeme Morris; UK6 All That Glitters... by Jim Bambra; and UK7 Dark Clouds Gather by Jim Bambra and Phil Gallagher. Some of these modules had their origins as the "GamesFair" tournament adventures. Don Turnbull was also the publisher of the UK-based D&D magazine Imagine.

== Final years ==
TSR UK Ltd was compromised by the management problems faced by its American parent company. In February 1987, Turnbull was brought on as the new CEO of New Infinities Productions. He spent a number of years in the US working for Gary Gygax, and then subsequently as a freelance journalist and occasional restaurant chef.

As gaming changed, with the new-found popularity of collectible card games, Turnbull returned to the UK and started a new career as a computer programmer, first in Cambridge and then in a village in Lancashire.

He remained an active player of both the piano and of pinball, having a grand piano and an Attack from Mars pinball table at his homes in Cambridge and Lancashire. He also continued to play role-playing games until shortly before his death, running a Dungeons & Dragons campaign in the world of "Urnst" with his friends.

Turnbull died of cancer in 2003.

== Awards ==
- Albion was awarded the Charles S. Roberts Award for Best Amateur Magazine in 1974.
- Don Turnbull was inducted into the Charles Roberts Awards Hall of Fame (1974).
- Don Turnbull was awarded first place in the 'Best Games Personality' award at the Games Workshop UK Games Day convention (1981).
- The 2004 Kathy Byrne Caruso award for Lifetime Achievement was awarded posthumously to Don Turnbull for founding UK postal Diplomacy.
