= Ghosts of Saltmarsh =

Dungeons & Dragons adventure anthology

- Rules required: Dungeons & Dragons, 5th edition
- Character levels: The Sinister Secret of Saltmarsh: 1 Danger at Dunwater: 3 Salvage Operation: 4 Isle of the Abbey: 5 The Final Enemy: 7 Tammeraut's Fate: 9 The Styes: 11
- Campaign setting: Greyhawk (default), setting-agnostic
- First published: May 21, 2019
- ISBN: 978-0-7869-6675-2

Ghosts of Saltmarsh is an adventure module anthology for the 5th edition of the Dungeons & Dragons fantasy role-playing game.

== Summary ==
Ghosts of Saltmarsh is an anthology of updated modules and adventures from previous editions, including three adventures from the classic 'U' series. The modules are modified to use the 5th edition rules, so that the adventures can be played in the order they are presented in the book, or dropped into a home campaign. If played in order as a seafaring campaign, it takes characters from level 1 through level 12. The adventures included, in the order of presentation and including original publication year, are:

- The Sinister Secret of Saltmarsh (1981)
- Danger at Dunwater (1982)
- Salvage Operation (2005)
- Isle of the Abbey (1992)
- The Final Enemy (1983)
- Tammeraut's Fate (2004)
- The Styes (2005)

Additionally, the book contains rules for ship-to-ship combat, character backgrounds and includes details on the port town of Saltmarsh which anchors each adventure.

== Publication history ==
In February 2019, the adventure anthology was announced by Wizards of the Coast. Ghosts of Saltmarsh was released on May 21, 2019. An alternate art cover was available exclusively in local game stores. Beadle & Grimm, a Wizards of the Coast licensee, released a special edition called the "Sinister Silver Edition of Ghosts of Saltmarsh". It includes the Ghosts of Saltmarsh broken into individual booklets for each chapter, physical props (such as amulets and tea stained in-world letters), a custom Dungeon Master's screen for this book, thirty hanging encounter cards, laminated ship maps and other handouts (such as regional maps and setting art).

== Reception ==
In Publishers Weekly's "Best-selling Books Week Ending 5/25/19", Ghosts of Saltmarsh was #6 in "Hardcover Nonfiction".

Cameron Kunzelman, for Paste, wrote that the book is "geared at more veteran players" and that he "found it very cool to read through". Kunzelman highlighted that "the history of 'sea adventures' seems a little more mechanically complicated than your average adventure, and it seems like a DM would need to really encourage players in specific ways if they wanted to run these as anything other than dungeon delves with strange enemies not often seen on shore. These are adventures, and they're good, but they're good for very specific things. Check 'em out if you love boats".

For Bleeding Cool, Gavin Sheehan wrote that "Ghosts of Saltmarsh is one of the best put-together books in the entire run of 5th Edition. I was a big fan of Yawning Portal as well, but this one feels like they took the lessons they learned from that book and refined them here. It takes a lot of work to mesh singular modules into a cohesive adventure, but [Mike] Mearls and Kate Welch (who served as the lead designers on this one) did a fantastic job. There's very little to complain about in this book as everything in it is both versatile and succinct when it comes to adventure building and storytelling. And sure, there are people who will look at this and think 'I don't feel like going out to sea' for their campaign, and that's okay because some of these can be adapted easily to fit what you need if you feel like taking your DM's tools to them".

Christian Hoffer, for Comicbook, wrote that "the book contains a surprising amount of references and nods to its Greyhawk roots. Saltmarsh has three competing factions that strive for influence around town, and two of them have direct ties to outside Greyhawk forces. One group is loyal to the king of Keoland and uses imperial authority to exert its influence, while another is connected to the sinister Scarlet Brotherhood, a classic group of Greyhawk antagonists. The Sea Princes, another Greyhawk faction, also play a role in the book. [...] While Ghosts of Saltmarsh contains plenty of nods to its Greyhawk roots, the book is still 'setting agnostic' as DMs and players don't need to know anything about Greyhawk before they sit down to play the adventure. The factions provide connective tissue between the adventures in Ghosts of Saltmarsh, but players can easily approach the chapters of the books as standalone adventures or pull Saltmarsh out of Greyhawk entirely without any significant issue".

On ship-to-ship combat, Brandes Stoddard, for Tribality, wrote that "most of what we saw in the [Unearthed Arcana] article of the same name seems to still be in place – the same component/battle station format for ships and naval combat. Adding in grid maps for each ship type (galley, keelboat, longship, rowboat, sailing ship, and warship) and area descriptions for average vessels of those types is awesome. The system for officers and crew are likewise recognizable from the UA text. [...] It's not hard to imagine how a series of unlucky rolls could put the PCs on the wrong end of a mutiny. I like that various significant failures are possible without automatically going to catastrophic failure. [...] On the downside, this is pages and pages of tables and text. On the upside, there's a huge variety of stories available here, contained in various table and check results. This is easily the beating heart of an exploration game, and it doesn't look like it would get repetitive in a hurry".
