= Graeme Morris (game designer) =

British RPG designer

- Born: Graeme Morris
- Occupation: Game designer
- Writing career
- Genre: Role-playing games

Graeme Morris is a British RPG designer.

== Career ==
Graeme Morris worked for TSR UK Ltd between 1981 and 1988. He designed adventures for Greyhawk, Dragonlance, Mystara, generic AD&D, "D&D" and Star Frontiers. He also contributed to the design of the original Fiend Folio tome as the creator of the hoar fox.

Morris contributed to the cartography, editing, and production for the U1-3 module series, The Sinister Secret of Saltmarsh, Danger at Dunwater, and The Final Enemy. He also contributed to the UK1-7 modules with cartography, design, and development for UK1 Beyond the Crystal Cave; concept, design and writing for UK2 The Sentinel and UK3 The Gauntlet; author and story-line for UK4 When a Star Falls; author and production for UK5 Eye of the Serpent; as well as story-line for UK6 All That Glitters and UK7 Dark Clouds Gather. The Creature Catalogue was compiled by Morris and he was the author for I8 Ravager of Time. With Mike Brunton, he wrote the UK module ST1 for the 1986 Stoke-on-Trent Garden Festival; Up the Garden Path which since has become one of the most sought-after AD&D modules of all time, for the reason that it had a very limited print run and the unsold items (after the Festival) were mostly pulped. One copy is reputed to have been sold at an online auction for nearly $1500.
