= The Sinister Secret of Saltmarsh =

Dungeons & Dragons adventure module

- The cover of The Sinister Secret of Saltmarsh, with art by Dave De Leuw. The artwork depicts the cliffside mansion of an evil alchemist.
- Code: U1
- TSR product code: 9062
- Rules required: AD&D
- Character levels: 1 - 3
- Campaign setting: Greyhawk
- Authors: Dave J. Browne with Don Turnbull
- First published: 1981

Linked modules
- U1 U2 U3

The Sinister Secret of Saltmarsh is a module for the Advanced Dungeons & Dragons (AD&D) roleplaying game, written by Dave J. Browne with Don Turnbull. The module details a mysterious abandoned mansion at the edge of a town called Saltmarsh, and the secrets contained therein. The adventure is set in the World of Greyhawk campaign setting. The Sinister Secret of Saltmarsh received positive reviews from critics.

== Plot summary ==
The Sinister Secret of Saltmarsh can be played by five to ten characters of 1st–3rd levels. The module includes optional pre-generated first level characters for use by the players. The scenario is the first of the Underwater (U) series of modules set in Saltmarsh, and details a ghostly ship and the haunted mansion of an evil alchemist. The module sleeve contains the following description:

Desolate and abandoned, the evil alchemist's mansion stands alone on the cliff, looking out towards the sea. Mysterious lights and ghostly hauntings have kept away the people of Saltmarsh, despite rumors of fabulous forgotten treasure. What is its sinister secret?

The module is divided into two parts, The Haunted House and Sea Ghost, which are intended to be played consecutively. The first part is set in the town of Saltmarsh and deals with unraveling the secret of the haunted house that lies on the edge of town. The abandoned, dilapidated mansion once belonging to an evil alchemist has been the subject of rumors of it being haunted but containing treasure. The second part of the module follows on from the first, expanding on the concept.

== Publication history ==
The Sinister Secret of Saltmarsh is the first installment in a series of three modules designed and developed in the United Kingdom, for beginning adventures with AD&D rules. The adventure was written by David J. Browne with Don Turnbull, and published in 1981 as a 32-page booklet with an outer folder. The publication contains large-scale maps, a full background story, and detailed encounter descriptions for the players and Dungeon Master (DM). The module serves as the introduction to an underwater campaign set in the town of Saltmarsh, which the DM can design from the guidelines provided. The next two modules, Danger at Dunwater and The Final Enemy, continue on from this adventure.

An updated version of the adventure was published in the 2019 anthology Ghosts of Saltmarsh for Dungeons & Dragons 5th edition.

== Reception ==
Anders Swenson reviewed The Sinister Secret of Saltmarsh for Different Worlds magazine and stated that "Overall, I like The Sinister Secret of Saltmarsh. It is nice to explore a house for a change. If modules U2 and U3 are as good as this one they should turn out to form a solid campaign."

The module was positively reviewed in Issue No. 35 of White Dwarf magazine by Jim Bambra, who scored it 9 out of 10 and described it as entertaining and interesting. Bambra criticized how the first-level characters provided with the module come equipped with magic items: "I fail to see how this can be justified, as the module is not difficult enough to warrant the bestowal of magic before play even begins. Magic items should be found by players as treasure and not come as handouts from the DM." Bambra noted that the adventure's main thrust engages the players' problem solving skills, forcing them to piece clues together, and that the encounters in the adventure should present no problems to an intelligent party. Overall, he felt that "TSR (UK) are to be congratulated on their first module, the series should prove to be interesting and entertaining."

David S. Turk reviewed The Sinister Secret of Saltmarsh for Fantasy Gamer magazine and stated that "In conclusion, the module is a strong one. With proper dungeon mastering and an ever-watchful group of player characters, this module is superior and quite enjoyable. It will surprise even the dungeon master with its creative story and twisting plot. I recommend it."

The module was ranked the 27th greatest Dungeons & Dragons adventure of all time by Dungeon magazine in 2004. Freelance gaming author James Maliszewski calls it "one of the best low-level modules ever written for Dungeons & Dragons" and "a superb example of adventure design". He listed the positive elements of the module as "the very matter-of-fact way it portrays a fantasy world" and the new spin it gives to "the standard low-level D&D tropes".

Ken Denmead of Wired listed the module as one of the "Top 10 D&D Modules I Found in Storage This Weekend". According to Denmead, this was "the Scooby Doo episode of D&D modules. Instead of a good old dungeon crawl, players got to explore a big old spooky house, and deal with all sorts of annoying wandering monsters, as well as traps and illusions."

Scott Taylor of Black Gate in 2015 rated the Saltmarsh series as #10 in "The Top 10 Campaign Adventure Module Series of All Time, saying "If you've never played it, I highly recommend you do."

== In video games ==
Dungeons & Dragons Online released an adaptation of the Sinister Secret of Saltmarsh adventure in 2021. The adventures are based on the lore of the original module but also its 5th edition variant, Ghosts of Saltmarsh.
