= Ian Livingstone =

English author and entrepreneur (born 1949)

Sir Ian Livingstone CBE
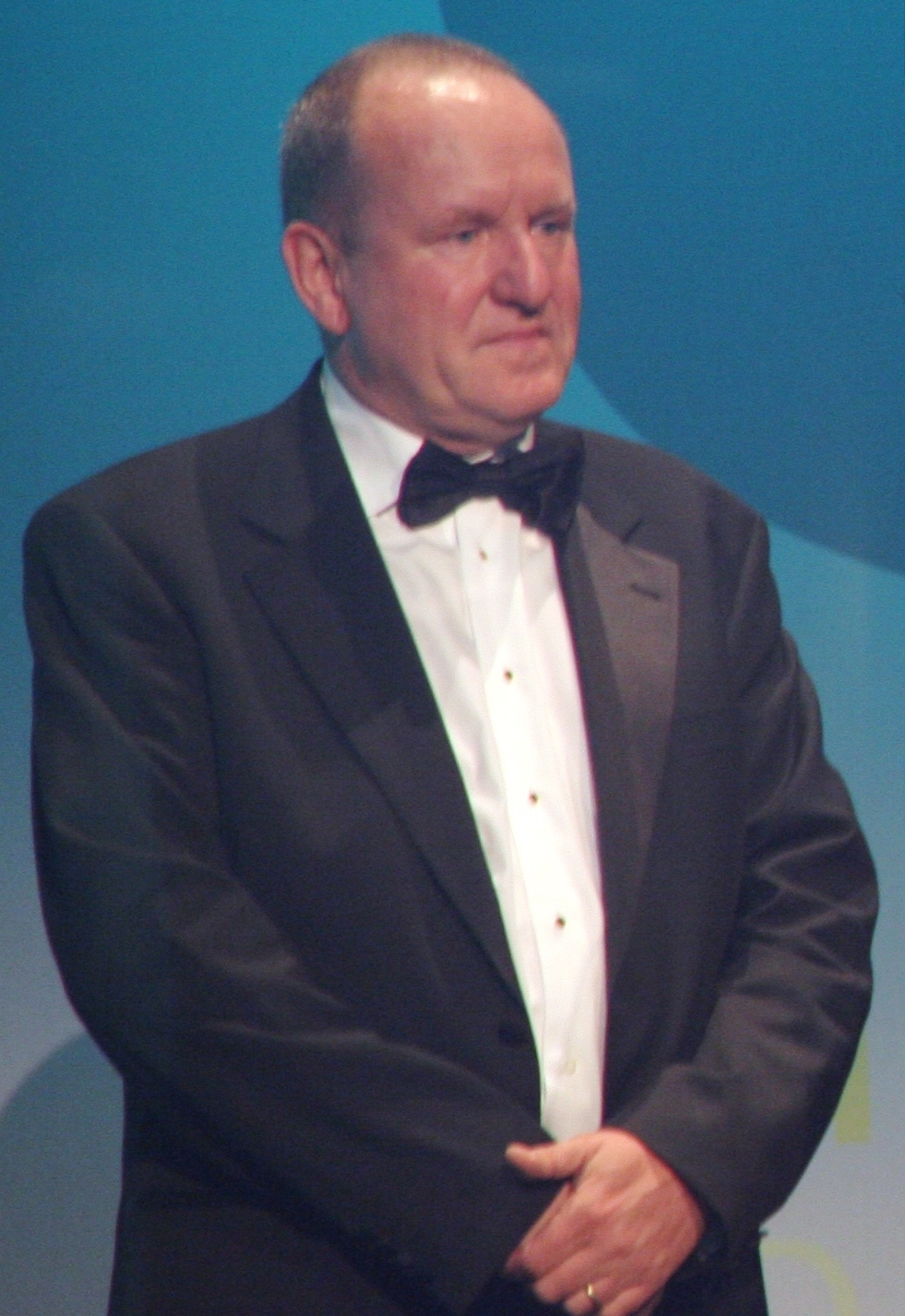
- Ian Livingstone at the Bafta Awards 2006
- Born: 29 December 1949 (age 76); Prestbury, Cheshire, England
- Occupations: Fantasy author; entrepreneur
- Known for: Co-creator for Fighting Fantasy gamebooks Co-founder for Games Workshop; Co-founder for Eidos Interactive

Sir Ian Livingstone (born 29 December 1949) is an English fantasy author and entrepreneur. He co-founded Games Workshop in 1975 and helped create Eidos Interactive as executive chairman of Eidos Plc in 1995. Along with Steve Jackson, he is also the co-creator of the Fighting Fantasy series of role-playing gamebooks, and the author of many books within that series.

== Early life ==
Livingstone attended Altrincham Grammar School for Boys, where he states that he only earned one A-level, in Geography. He has kept his close links with the school and has visited it on numerous occasions.

== Career ==
=== Games Workshop ===
Livingstone co-founded Games Workshop in early 1975 with flatmates John Peake and Steve Jackson. They began publishing the monthly newsletter Owl and Weasel, and distributed copies of the first issue to fanzine Albion subscribers; Brian Blume received one of these copies, and sent them a copy of the new game Dungeons & Dragons in return. Livingstone and Jackson found this game to be more imaginative than games produced in the UK at the time, and so worked out an arrangement with Blume for an exclusive deal to sell D&D in Europe. They began distributing Dungeons & Dragons and other TSR products later in 1975. Livingstone and Jackson organised a convention for their first time in late 1975, which became known as the first Games Day. Because they were selling products out of their flat, customers would come there looking for a store that did not exist; because of this their landlord evicted them in summer 1976.

Under the direction of Livingstone and Jackson, Games Workshop expanded from a bedroom mail order company to a successful gaming manufacturer and retail chain, with the first Games Workshop store opening in Hammersmith in 1977. In June of that year, partially to advertise the opening, Livingstone and Jackson launched the gaming magazine White Dwarf, with Livingstone as the editor. Livingstone chose the title, which had meaning relevant to both the fantasy and science fiction genres: a white dwarf could be a reference to both a stellar phenomenon and to a fantasy character. Livingstone ended his run as editor after White Dwarf #74 (February 1986).

In 1980, Livingstone and Jackson began to develop the concept of the Fighting Fantasy gamebook series, the first volume of which (The Warlock of Firetop Mountain) was published in 1982 by Puffin Books. Livingstone and Jackson sold Games Workshop in 1991 for £10 million. The pair, together with Bryan Ansell, founded Citadel Miniatures in Newark to make miniatures for games. Livingstone has also invented several board games, including Boom Town, Judge Dredd, Automania, Legend of Zagor, and Dragonmasters.

=== Fighting Fantasy ===
In 1982, Jackson and Livingstone co-wrote The Warlock of Firetop Mountain, the first book in the Fighting Fantasy series, but following an instruction from publishers Penguin to write more books "as quickly as possible" the pair wrote subsequent books separately. The series had sold over 18 million copies as of 2017, with Livingstone's Deathtrap Dungeon selling over 350,000 copies in its first year alone. Livingstone wrote another twelve Fighting Fantasy gamebooks, including The Forest of Doom, City of Thieves and Caverns of the Snow Witch before marking the 30th anniversary of The Warlock of Firetop Mountain with a new gamebook, Blood of the Zombies, in 2012, and with The Port of Peril in 2017 for the 35th anniversary.

=== Video games ===
In the mid-1980s Livingstone did design work for video game publisher Domark; he returned to the company in 1993 as a major investor and board member. Livingstone later recounted, "After the success of Games Workshop, I retired, got bored, and invested in Domark to fund their cartridge development. I got in at just the wrong time - it was all going flat." In 1995, Domark was acquired by the video technology company Eidos, which had been floated on the London Stock Exchange in 1990, and formed the major part of the newly created Eidos plc, known for Eidos Interactive. Livingstone resigned as executive chairman in 2002 and became creative director. In 2005 Eidos was taken over by SCi and Livingstone was the only former board member to be retained, taking on the role of product acquisition director. Livingstone secured many of the company's major franchises, including Tomb Raider and Hitman. He contributed to the Tomb Raider project Tomb Raider: Anniversary (an enhanced version of the original Tomb Raider game), which was released in 2007. In 2009, Japanese video-game company Square Enix completed a buyout of Eidos Interactive and Livingstone was promoted to Life President of Eidos, a position he resigned from in 2013.

In 2014 Livingstone appeared in the documentary feature film From Bedrooms to Billions (2014) a film that tells the story of the British Video Games Industry from 1979 to present. Livingstone was the non-executive chairman of Sumo Group from 2015 to 2022. He is a general partner at Hiro Capital, which invested in Skybound Entertainment in 2022.

=== Educational ===
In 2010 Livingstone was asked to act as the Skills Champion by government minister Ed Vaizey, tasked with producing a report reviewing the UK video games industry. The 'NextGen' report, co-authored with Alex Hope of visual effects firm Double Negative, was released in 2011; Livingstone described it as a "complete bottom up review of the whole education system relating to games." A school named Livingstone Academy was planned for 2021.

== Awards and honours ==
- In 2002, Livingstone won the BAFTA Interactive Special Award for outstanding contribution to the industry.
- Livingstone was appointed Officer of the Order of the British Empire (OBE) in the 2006 New Year Honours, and Commander of the Order of the British Empire (CBE) in the 2013 New Year Honours both for services to the computer gaming industry.
- In 2011, Livingstone received an Honorary Doctorate of Arts from Bournemouth University.
- Livingstone was knighted in the 2022 New Year Honours for services to the online gaming industry.

== Bibliography ==
=== Fighting Fantasy ===
- The Warlock of Firetop Mountain (1982) with Steve Jackson, Puffin Books
- The Forest of Doom (1983)
- City of Thieves (1983)
- Deathtrap Dungeon (1984)
- Island of the Lizard King (1984)
- Caverns of the Snow Witch (1984)
- Freeway Fighter (1985)
- Temple of Terror (1985)
- Trial of Champions (1986)
- Crypt of the Sorcerer (1987)
- Armies of Death (1988)
- Return to Firetop Mountain (1992)
- Eye of the Dragon (2005)
- Blood of the Zombies (2012)
- The Port of Peril (2017)
- Assassins of Allansia (2019)
- Shadow of the Giants (2022)
- The Dungeon on Blood Island (2024)

=== Fighting Fantasy First Adventures: Adventures of Goldhawk ===
- Darkmoon's Curse (1995)
- The Demon Spider (1995)
- Mudworm Swamp (1995)
- Ghost Road (1995)

=== Other works ===
- Dicing with Dragons (1982)
- Eureka! (1984), Domark
- Shadowmaster (1992) with Marc Gascoigne
- Casket of Souls (1987)
- Board Games in 100 Moves: 8,000 Years of Play (2019) with James Wallis
- Dice Men: The Origin Story of Games Workshop (2022)

=== Education ===
- Livingstone Academy
