= Eidos Interactive =

British video game publisher

Eidos Interactive Limited
- Formerly: Domark Limited (1984–1990); Domark Group Limited (1990–1996)
- Type: Subsidiary
- Industry: Video games
- Founded: 1984; 42 years ago in Putney, London, England
- Founders: Mark Strachan; Dominic Wheatley
- Defunct: 10 November 2009; 16 years ago
- Fate: Merged with Square Enix in 2009
- Successor: Square Enix Limited
- Headquarters: Wimbledon, London, England
- Key people: Ian Livingstone (executive chairman of Eidos plc, 1995–2002)
- Products: Championship Manager; Deus Ex; Hitman; Legacy of Kain; Thief; Tomb Raider
- Parent: Eidos plc (1995–2005); SCi Entertainment (2005–2009)

Eidos Interactive Limited (formerly Domark Limited) was a British video game publisher based in Wimbledon, London. Among its franchises were Championship Manager, Deus Ex, Hitman, Thief, Legacy of Kain and Tomb Raider. Domark was founded by Mark Strachan and Dominic Wheatley in 1984. In 1995, it was acquired by software company Eidos. Ian Livingstone, who held a stake in Domark, became executive chairman of Eidos and held various roles including creative director. Eidos took over U.S. Gold in 1996, which included developer Core Design, and merged its operations including Domark, which created publishing subsidiary Eidos Interactive. The company acquired Crystal Dynamics in 1998, and owned numerous other assets. In 2005, parent Eidos was taken over by games publisher SCi. The combined company, SCi Entertainment Group, which was briefly renamed Eidos, was itself taken over by Square Enix in 2009.

Square Enix completed its merger with Eidos Interactive by November 2009, absorbing it primarily into Square Enix Limited (also known as Square Enix Europe). Eidos executive Phil Rogers stayed with the company as Square Enix Europe CEO and became CEO of Americas and Europe in 2013 along with other executives. (Note: Americas referring to fellow group company Square Enix Incorporated. Square Enix Limited's area of activity are former PAL territories, while Square Enix Incorporated's area of activity are the Americas.) In August 2022, Embracer Group completed its acquisition of Crystal Dynamics, Eidos-Montréal and Square Enix Montréal and the Tomb Raider, Legacy of Kain, Deus Ex and Thief intellectual properties, among other assets. Rogers joined Embracer and formed an operative group called CDE Entertainment.

== History ==
=== Founding of publisher Domark (1984–1994) ===
Former Domark logo (1984–1996)

Domark was founded by Mark Strachan and Dominic Wheatley in 1984. For Christmas 1983, Wheatley (the grandson of the writer Dennis Wheatley) had visited his family, where he saw his brother play The Heroes of Karn on a newly purchased Commodore 64. He was impressed with the game and felt that ordinary people, not just those who worked with computers professionally, would start acquiring computers and games for them. When he returned to his London job as a junior account executive at a small advertising agency, he spoke to Strachan, his colleague, and floated the idea of setting up a company to publish games from third-party developers. Strachan initially declined but later saw that many retailers in the city had sold out of ZX Spectrum models, which he felt signaled great interest in video games. Strachan and Wheatley, then aged 24, subsequently quit their jobs and founded Domark, using a portmanteau of their first names for the company. To design the adventure game Eureka!, they hired Andromeda Software and the Hungarian developer Novotrade, and brought in Ian Livingstone as its writer. Strachan and Wheatley further devised a competition in which a telephone number would be shown upon completing the game, and the first person to call it would win £25,000. Through friends, family, and other acquaintances, they raised £160,000, more than enough to finance the project. Domark released the game later in 1984, marketing it through Concept Marketing, another firm set up by Strachan and Wheatley. Impressed with the company's operations, Livingstone invested £10,000 in Domark. Eureka! sold 15,000 copies. Domark were unsure what project to pursue next; Strachan and Wheatley had a contact in the estate of Ian Fleming and approached them with the idea of producing a video game based on James Bond. In 1985, Domark obtained a licence to A View to a Kill. Despite delays caused by scope creep, the eponymous game was released later in 1985 and was "actually quite successful", according to Wheatley.

Domark found further success with computer conversions of board games: Trivial Pursuit was becoming increasingly popular, so Domark got into contact with games publisher Leisure Genius, which had found success with board game conversions. Leisure Genius was skeptical about a conversion of Trivial Pursuit, and Domark hired Oxford Digital Enterprises to develop it instead. Released in 1986, the Trivial Pursuit sold roughly 2 million copies. The success allowed Domark to move into proper offices and hire more employees. Domark released further Trivial Pursuit and James Bond games in the years following. The company also got into arcade game conversions in 1987 when Wheatley, alone at the Consumer Electronics Show in Las Vegas, encountered Manlio Allegra, an agent for companies including Atari Games. Allegra wanted Domark to produce conversions for as many games as possible but Wheatley claimed that the company had only £25,000 to spend. Allegra then went through a list of games to be licensed at low prices and Wheatley stopped him when he mentioned the Star Wars trilogy of games. They agreed on a license for Wheatley's claimed budget. To have the games developed, Domark brought a German programmer to England, who had previously developed Star Wars for the Amiga. Domark released its versions later in 1987, and they became so successful that the first royalty cheque paid to Atari Games two months later amounted to £280,000. Impressed with this return, Atari Games hired Domark as the exclusive partner for computer conversions of arcade games. With sufficient funds, the company published various games through the rest of the 1980s. It set up an internal development team, The Kremlin, within its Putney headquarters in 1990 and expanded to 20 employees by 1992. In the same year, Livingstone joined Domark's board as an investor, while Wheatley moved with his wife and two children to the US to better manage the company's American contacts. A US subsidiary for Domark was formally established in Silicon Valley in 1993.

=== Takeover and transformation into Eidos Interactive (1994–2005) ===
In 1994, Strachan and Wheatley encountered Charles Cornwall, chairman of Eidos, a company that developed video compression software for systems like the Acorn Archimedes. Domark was struggling on the business side and Eidos had no sales at that time, so the two companies agreed to a reverse takeover. Domark was merged with Eidos, with Domark's operations aligned as a subsidiary of the newer Eidos. The deal was announced in September 1995 as an acquisition of Domark (alongside developers Simis and Big Red Software) by Eidos for £12.9 million. The new company was floated on the London Stock Exchange (LSE) as Eidos that year. Livingstone became executive chairman and Strachan left Domark in that year.

On 31 May 1996, Simis and Big Red Software were merged into Domark. Eidos took over CentreGold in April 1996 for £17.6 million. CentreGold consisted of distributor CentreSoft (Note: Distributor Centresoft conducted a management buyout.) and publisher U.S. Gold, which included development subsidiaries Core Design and Silicon Dreams Studio. Eidos Interactive's first major title was soon to be released Tomb Raider by Core Design, which CentreGold had itself acquired two years prior. Silicon Dreams Studio was re-acquired by its founder, Geoff Brown, through newly founded Geoff Brown Holdings (later Kaboom Studios), on 16 December that year. In 1997, Wheatley left the company to move back to Britain and focus on other projects. Also that year, Eidos was among the companies auditor Coopers & Lybrand resigned from citing corporate governance inadequacies with KPMG succeeding it. In January 1998, Opticom entered into an agreement with Eidos to develop storage devices, with both companies holding shares in each other. Eidos acquired developer Crystal Dynamics in September 1998. Also that year, Eidos acquired the European operations of the Sony-owned game devleoper Psygnosis. In 1999, Eidos acquired a 51% stake in Ion Storm, in exchange for advances to the developers, and a US$55m stake in web portal company Maximum Holdings. Eidos founder Stephen B. Streater resigned as director in June and went on to found Forbidden Technologies. The following year Eidos CEO Cornwall left the company to focus on technology and mining interests and was succeeded by former COO Michael McGarvey. A publicised takeover bid from Infogrames Entertainment SA failed to materialize in October 2000. In January 2002, Eidos established label Fresh Games for games localised from Japan, with titles including Mister Mosquito, Mad Maestro! and Legaia 2: Duel Saga. Livingstone stepped down as chairman and became creative director in September 2002. In August 2003, Eidos began operations in Australia, with its previous operations in Singapore taken over by Atari SA. Also that year, Eidos founded Beautiful Game Studios inside its headquarters, which continued its Championship Manager series after splitting with previous developer Sports Interactive. In March 2004, Eidos acquired Danish developer IO Interactive, which was developing published title Hitman: Contracts. Ion Storm was closed in February 2005.

On 21 March 2005, Eidos received a takeover bid from Elevation Partners, a private equity firm owned by former Electronic Arts (EA) president John Riccitiello. This takeover valued the company at £71 million, and would inject £23 million in order to keep the company from bankruptcy in the short term. Elevation stated it plans to take Eidos private for some years to focus on game creation and release schedules, and its offer was initially recommended by Eidos' board.

=== Parent Eidos taken over by SCi (2005–2009) ===
On 22 March 2005, Eidos plc received a second takeover bid from games publisher SCi. The bid was for £74 million, and tabled a restructuring plan to cut £14 million from annual costs. To fund this takeover, SCi proposed to sell £60 million worth of stock. In late April, Elevation Partners formally withdrew its offer, leaving the way clear for SCi. SCi's takeover was finalized on 16 May 2005, with SCi merging itself into Eidos Interactive's parent SCi Entertainment Group. Livingstone was the only returning board member and became product acquisition director.

Core Design pitched a Tomb Raider remake for the game's 10th anniversary to SCi/Eidos in 2005. Former studio manager Gavin Rummery stated in 2015 that SCi loved the project, but Crystal Dynamics had their own demo, which then convinced SCi to cancel Core's project (Tomb Raider: Anniversary). In May 2006, Rebellion Developments acquired Core Designs' assets and staff, while the Core brand and intellectual property, including Tomb Raider, remained with SCi. In December 2006, Warner Bros. licensed classic properties to SCi, while investing for 10.3% of SCi shares. In 2007, SCi acquired a number of new studios for its New Media division: mobile phone developer Rockpool Games, along with its two sister companies Ironstone Partners and SoGoPlay, Morpheme, and gaming portal Bluefish Media. Majesco signed a distribution deal for eight games with SCi in April 2007. In November 2007, SCi opened a new studio in Montreal, Quebec, which was later named Eidos-Montréal and developed a new game in the Deus Ex franchise.

On 4 September 2007, SCi stated that it had been approached with possible offers for the company. By January 2008, the offer talks had halted. The share price dropped by over 50% and shareholders called for the resignation of key personnel, including CEO Jane Cavanagh, over this issue as well as delays to key titles. On 18 January 2008, Cavanagh and management team left the company. Jürgen Goeldner was as appointed as interim COO that month. In February 2008, SCi began a "radical" restructuring plan under newly appointed CEO Phil Rogers, a former Electronic Arts corporate development director. The plan included reducing the head count and cancelling 14 in-development projects for quality or financial reasons. This was intended to reduce annual operating costs by £14 million by June 2008 at a singular cost of £7 million. Rogers later stated it wants to be a "leaner and fitter company", as well as "studio-led". It moved "certain functions" from the United Kingdom to Quebec, Canada, partially due to economic advantages offered by Montreal's government. SCi subsidiary Pivotal Games was closed in July. Koch Media acquired Proein, SCi's Spanish distribution division, in July 2008. During SCi 2008 financial report, losses were at £100 million, which Rogers stated were due to the reconstructing plans. On 19 September 2008, SCi opened a Shanghai-based studio, Eidos Shanghai, consisting of a small team to build up relations in Asia. In 2008, SCi set up an entity, which later became Square Enix London Studios headed by Lee Singleton in its Wimbledon headquarters. In December 2008, SCi rebranded as Eidos. Rockpool Games was closed in January 2009.

=== SCi/Eidos taken over by and absorbed into Square Enix (2009) ===
In February 2009, Square Enix reached an agreement to purchase Eidos plc for £84.3 million, pending shareholder approval, with an initial aim of completing the takeover on 6 May 2009. The offer was backed by majority stakeholder Warner Bros. The date was brought forward, and Square Enix took over Eidos on 22 April 2009. That month, Eidos Hungary (formerly Mithis Entertainment) was closed among other cuts and Livingstone became Life President of Eidos. Square Enix initially stated that it would let Eidos remain structured as it was at the time of its takeover. In July 2009, it announced that it would merge Eidos into Square Enix, which created a new entity, tentatively titled Square Enix Europe and described as a business unit representing sales and marketing offices in the United Kingdom, France and Germany. Eidos' US operations were merged with Square Enix Incorporated, headed by John Yamamoto. The merger was completed on 10 November 2009 with the company Square Enix Limited organized under Square Enix Europe. Square Enix Europe under Rogers continued to manage the former SCi/Eidos studios.

== Games published ==
Domark's prominent games series was Championship Manager, the first title being developed by Sports Interactive and released in September 1992. For Eidos Interactive, it was Tomb Raider, the first being developed by Core Design and released in October 1996.

== Legacy ==
=== Square Enix divisions ===
- Square Enix External Studios (originally Square Enix London Studios), founded by Eidos in 2008. A division responsible for working with third-party developers on Batman: Arkham Asylum, Just Cause, Sleeping Dogs, Life Is Strange and Outriders.
- Square Enix Collective, founded in 2014. A division working with games of independent developers, originally potentially offering Eidos IPs to developers.

=== Studios and related IPs acquired by Embracer (2022) ===
In May 2022, Square Enix announced it would sell several of Square Enix Limited's assets to Embracer Group for $300 million. These included development studios Crystal Dynamics, Eidos-Montréal, Square Enix Montréal, and intellectual properties such as Tomb Raider, Deus Ex, Thief, Legacy of Kain alongside "50 back-catalogue games", with the deal expected to be completed in the second quarter of Embracer's financial year. Embracer announced that the subsidiaries and IPs would form as its 12th operative group, under the leadership of Phil Rogers, and was later given the name of CDE (Crystal Dynamics - Eidos) Entertainment. Square Enix's activities will continue to include publishing games from third-party studios including Outriders, Life Is Strange and Just Cause. On 20 May 2022, Embracer stated it sees potential in sequels, remakes and remasters. The deal was completed on 26 August 2022. In November 2022, Embracer shut down Square Enix Montréal and transferred Eidos-Shanghai to Gearbox Entertainment as Gearbox Studio Shanghai.

=== Development studios ===
Studio	Subsidiaries of studio	Location	Founded	Acquired	Fate	Ref.
Domark		London, England	1984	1995	Transformed into Eidos Interactive in 1996	
Simis		London, England	1988	1995	Transformed into Eidos Interactive in 1996	
Big Red Software		Leamington Spa, England	1989	1995	Transformed into Eidos Interactive in 1996	
CentreGold	U.S. Gold	Birmingham, England	1984	1996	Transformed into Eidos Interactive in 1996	
CentreGold	Core Design	Derby, England	1988	1996	Assets acquired by Rebellion Developments in 2006	
CentreGold	Silicon Dreams Studio	Adderbury, England	1994	1996	Management buyout in 1996	
Crystal Dynamics		Redwood City, California	1992	1998	Became Square Enix subsidiary; acquired by Embracer in 2022	
Ion Storm		Dallas, Texas; Austin, Texas	1996	1999	Closed in 2005	
Beautiful Game Studios		Eidos' headquarters	2003		Became Square Enix subsidiary	
IO Interactive		Copenhagen, Denmark	1998	2004	Became Square Enix subsidiary; management buyout in 2017	
IO Interactive	Hapti.co	Copenhagen, Denmark	2012		Became Square Enix subsidiary; management buyout in 2017	
Pivotal Games		Bath, England	2000	Originally subsidiary of SCi	Closed in 2008	
Eidos Hungary		Budapest, Hungary	2002	2006	Closed in 2009	
Eidos Studios Sweden		Helsingborg, Sweden	1987	2006	Closed in 2008	
Eidos-Montréal		Montreal, Quebec	2007		Became Square Enix subsidiary; acquired by Embracer in 2022	
Eidos-Montréal	Eidos-Shanghai	Shanghai, China	2008		Became part of Eidos-Montréal in 2019; became Gearbox Studio Shanghai in 2022	
Morpheme Wireless		London, England	1999	2007	Closed in 2009	
Morpheme Wireless	Gimme5Games	London, England	2007		Management buyout in 2009	
Rockpool Games		Manchester, England	2002	2007	Closed in 2009	
Square Enix Montréal		Montreal, Quebec	2011		Acquired and closed by Embracer in 2022	
Square Enix Montréal	Square Enix London Mobile	London, England	2021		Acquired and closed by Embracer in 2022	

== See also ==
- Stephen B. Streater
- Kuju
