= Livingstone Academy Bournemouth =

Coordinates: 50.7235°N 1.8679°W

- Bournemouth

Information
- Established: September 22nd, 2023
- Founder: Ian Livingstone
- Status: Open
- Principal: Mrs Jennifer Warr
- Age range: 4-19

Livingstone Academy Bournemouth is a public secondary school located in Bournemouth, England, The school was founded on September 22, 2023, by Ian Livingstone
