= Golden Demon =

Miniature Painting Competition

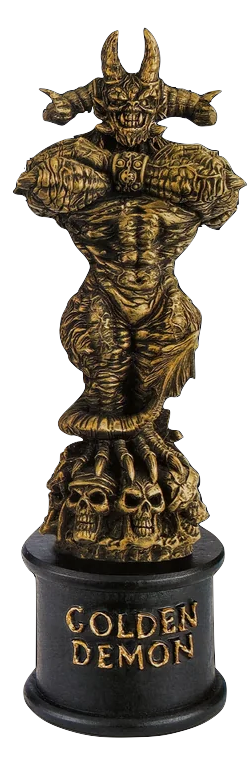
Golden Demon Trophy

The Golden Demon competition is a miniature painting and modelling competition run by Games Workshop. Established in 1987 in the UK, it is the longest running miniature painting competition in the world, and has since spread to several countries. As of 2025, it is held in Germany, as part of the Spiel Essen Game Fair, and in the United States, as part of the Adepticon convention.

Each year, members of the public bring along miniatures that they have spent weeks, and often months, painting specifically for the competition in the hope that their piece will be painted well enough to be awarded one of the legendary Golden Demon statuettes.

The figures are all put on display―typically in glass cabinets―for the public to admire, whilst a team of judges examine each one of the thousands of miniatures entered, to decide which are most worthy of an award.

There are several categories into which figures can be entered, ranging from a single miniature to whole regiments, and from duels to action packed dioramas. Gold, Silver and Bronze trophies are awarded to the first, second and third places respectively in each category.

The Gold winners of each of these categories are then judged to find out who is the overall winner of that year's competition. The winner is awarded the Slayer Sword for the miniature considered the 'Best of Show'. This most prestigious trophy is the highest accolade that any Warhammer figure painter can achieve.

In the past, the winning entrants used to have their prized figures published in White Dwarf, and later in a separate winners booklet that came along with White Dwarf. Today, the winners are published in the Warhammer Community's website.

Golden Demon has historically allowed Games Workshop to spot hidden talents and bring their skills to the Studio; they have discovered many talented painters and artists as a result and recruited them to the ‘Eavy Metal team. Until 2023, winners were sometimes handed a card with recruitment details should they want to pursue a career in the company.

== History ==
=== The Origins Of Golden Demon ===
In the early 1980s, before Golden Demon was created, Games Workshop used to run painting competitions during the Citadel Open Days (initiated in 1984) and the Dragonmeet convention (formerly 'D&D Day', initiated in 1977). However, Games Workshop discovered that some people would enter other companies' miniatures, and it was from a need to establish a clearly defined set of rules that Golden Demon emerged.

The Golden Demon competition was thus devised by John Blanche, Games Workshop's Art Director, and Andy Jones, Events Organiser at the time. Because of the wide variety of Citadel Miniatures that were likely to be entered, a series of definitive categories were established.

=== The Early Years (1987-1988) ===
The first Golden Demon was held on 27th June 1987 in Nottingham, UK at the Victoria Leisure Centre. Regional heats were organised all over the country in Games Workshop stores and hobby shops as a forerunner to the main event. The entries at this stage of the proceedings were judged by shop staff, with some shops inviting games personalities along as guest judges. The three winners from each heat were invited to the Grand Championship Final in Victoria Leisure Centre, Nottingham.

Judges at the final were John Blanche and Bryan Ansell, and cash prizes of up to £250 were awarded to the winners, with over £3,000 awarded in total.

At the first event there were eight categories, which formed the basis for some of the categories that would become typical of later competitions, such as 'Single Miniature' and 'Diorama'.

- Single Character Figure
- Single Conversion
- Monster
- Dragon
- Single Mounted Figure
- Diorama
- Vignette
- Warhammer Battle Regiment

The second Golden Demon event in 1988 also followed the format of qualifiers through regional heats, with the Grand Final taking place again in the Victoria Leisure Centre, Nottingham on 30th July 1988. Golden Demon 1988 was again judged by John Blanche and Bryan Ansell.

The 1988 winners were compiled in a book entitled 'Fantasy Miniatures', the first of four such volumes (the other three published in 1989, 1990 and 2002).

=== The Derby Years (1989-1991) ===
The third Golden Demon event in 1989 yet again made use of regional heats; however, the Grand Final for the first time was held alongside Games Day, which took place at the Assembly Rooms in Derby on 27th May 1989. Furthermore, Golden Demon was for the first time marketed as an international, not national, painting championship. Cash prizes were still awarded to the winners (£150 for Gold, £80 for Silver, and £40 for Bronze winners), with £1,000's to be won.

By 1989, categories had expanded from the first event, now including 40k Vehicle, Blood Bowl Team, or Titans. Alongside Golden Demon, the parallel competition 'Marauder Blade' was also established, where national heat winners competed for three handcrafted short swords in three categories: Orc Vignette, Dwarf Vignette, and Single Figure (changed to Single Miniature, Regiment, and Vignette in 1990).

The Judging Team was restructured in 1989, and a panel with three judges was established. It was made up of Mike McVey, Phil Lewis and Ivan Bartleet (the previous year's Slayer Sword winner).

In 1990, Golden Demon and Marauder Blade took place again in Derby on 26th May 1990, but reverted to being run independently from Games Day, and 1990 saw the introduction of a Youngbloods Competition in parallel to Golden Demon, aimed at painters aged 14 or younger. The first Youngbloods Competition was composed of three categories (Single Figure, Monster, and Mounted Figure) with the overall winner being awarded the 'Youngbloods Axe'.

In 1991, regional heats increased the number of models that went to the Grand Final: the ten best from each Games Workshop store, and the three best from each independent stockist.

The judging panel for 1991 was increased to four judges: John Blanche, Mike McVey, Alan Merrett and Rick Priestley.

Golden Demon 1991, the last event that took place in Derby, stopped awarding cash prizes, and after two years of running alongside Golden Demon, Marauder Blade was discontinued.

=== Consolidation (1992-1994) ===
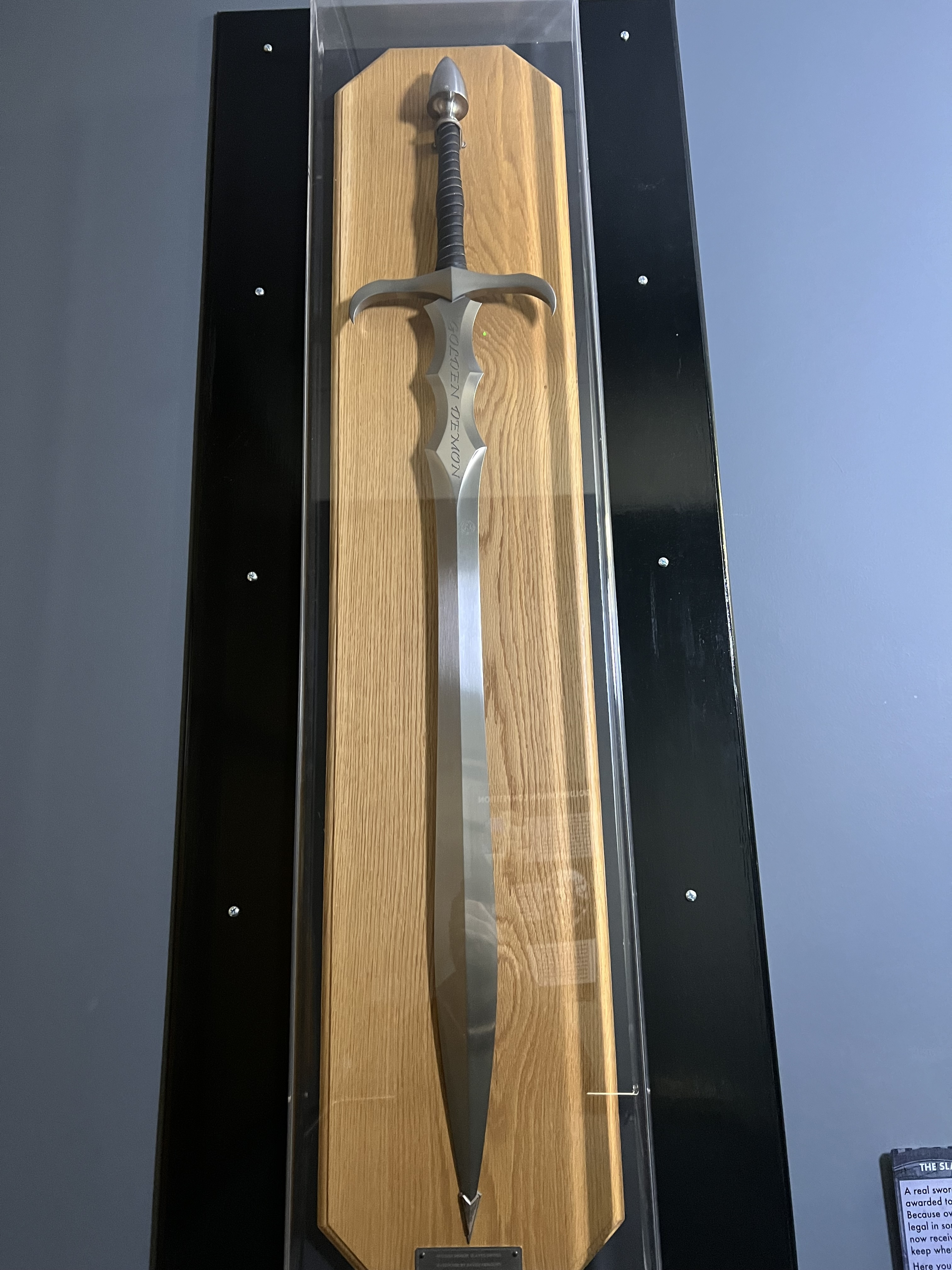
Slayer Sword 1988-2008 by Raven Armoury

By 1992, Golden Demon had grown so much in size and had attracted such a huge following that the competition had to be moved to a larger venue with more space and better facilities. The selected venue was Birmingham NEC, and Golden Demon 1992 took place on 18th April 1992. Although in 1992 regional heats were still in place, independent stockists had been excluded and submissions had to be done solely at official Games Workshop stores. The 10 regional winners (one from each category), who received a Golden Demon badge and a winner's certificate, went forward to represent their shop in the particular category at the Grand Finals at the NEC.

Albeit originally advertised as taking place in NEC, Golden Demon 1993 was finally celebrated at the Sheffield Arena on 2nd May 1993, preceded by the customary regional heats held at Games Workshop stores throughout the country, and for the first time at Games Workshop stores abroad too (e.g. winners of the heats in Spain were invited to the Grand Finals in the UK).

Golden Demon 1993 was judged in advance, as Games Workshop wanted to better display the miniatures on the day, and not have to keep removing them from the cabinets for photography and examination. The winners from the regional heats were sent to Games Workshop's Studio in Nottingham, where judging took place. Another peculiarity of Golden Demon 1993 was the introduction of a 'Veterans Category', where only previous winners were allowed to enter. This was short-lived as it was removed from the following year's competition category list.

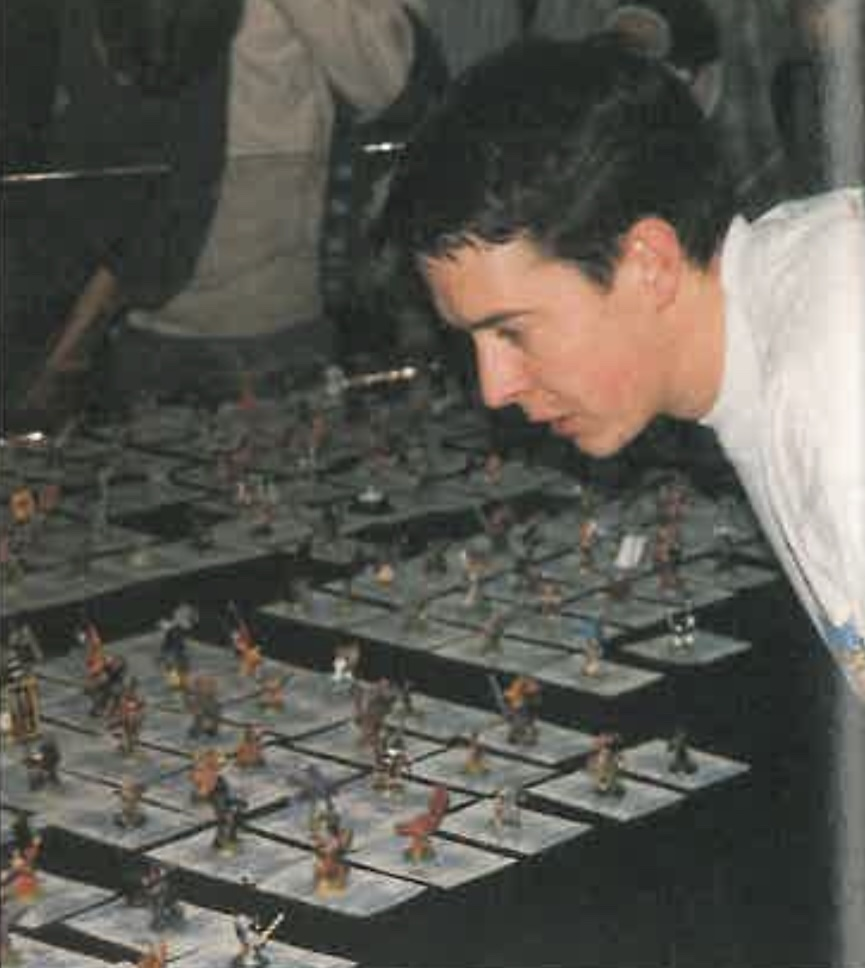
Mike McVey Judging Golden Demon

Golden Demon 1994 saw the return to Birmingham (where it stayed until 2013), this time in the NIA. Golden Demon 1994 was the only Golden Demon in history where no Slayer Sword or other Best of Show trophy was awarded on the day. The winner was however declared so retrospectively more than 15 years later (sometime between 2008 and 2012). Golden Demon 1994 also saw the return of the Youngbloods Competition, which had not taken place for several years. It was however limited to just one single miniature category and restricted to only plastic models (expanded to metal miniatures in 1997). By this point, Mike McVey had become the head judge.

=== The Games Day Years (1995-2013) ===
1995 marked a big shift in how Golden Demon was organised. To begin with, it went back to being organised as part of the larger Games Day event, like it had been in 1989. Secondly, in the pursuit of a more open structure, it put an end to the regional heats system, and all contestants entered their models directly on the day, a change that has lasted to this day. Golden Demon 1995 was celebrated on 15th October 1995 in the Birmingham NIA. 1995 also saw the introduction of the Open Competition to Golden Demon, today a staple category, and an opportunity to let entrants' imagination run riot and where Games Workshop staff could also enter. At the beginning, the Open Competition accepted 1:1 scale artefacts to be entered, but these were banned sometime in the mid 2000's. The Open Competition was a single prize category until 2004. From 2005 Silver and Bronze trophies were added.

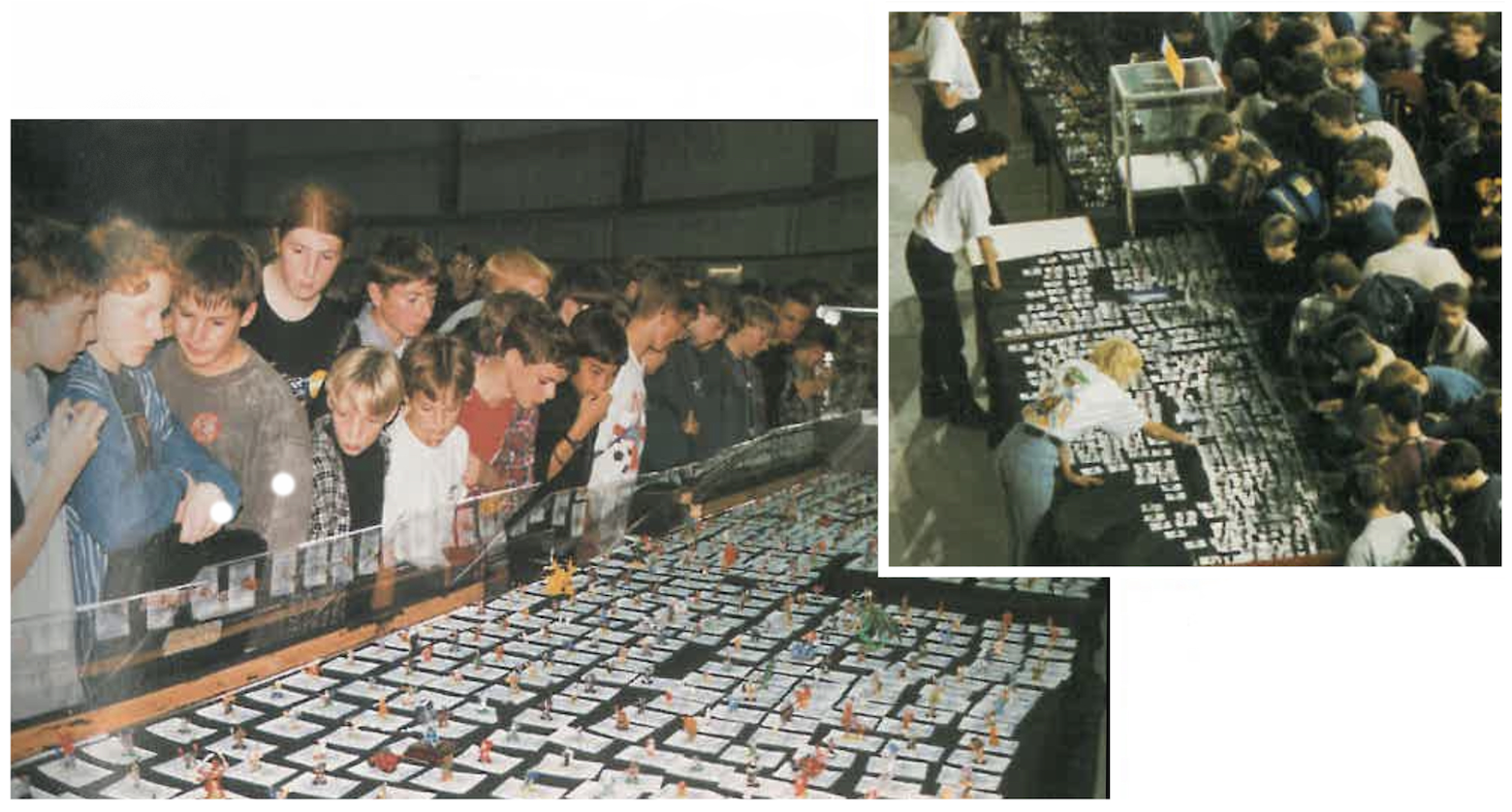
Golden Demon in the mid-90s

Between 1996 and 2013, Golden Demon, by now a well-established competition, continued to take place in Birmingham, either at the NIA or the NEC. In 1996, to modernise the Golden Demon brand, a specific logo was created for the competition, depicting a blue marble slab with golden letters. This logo is still in use today, albeit without the blue backdrop. By 1997, the competition had over 2,500 entries and was judged by Mike McVey, Dave Andrews and Matt Parkes.

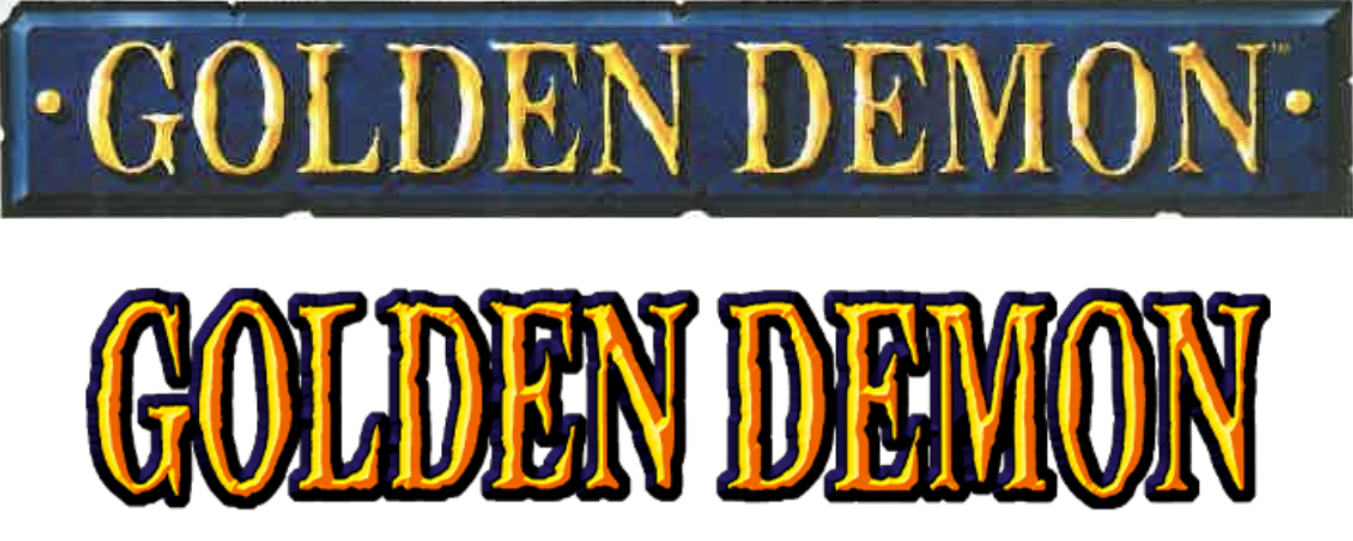
The Golden Demon Logo Evolution

The categories by this point had evolved quite a lot from the early days and were very similar to what they are today.

The period between the late 1990's and mid 2000's is commonly referred to as the 'Golden Age' of Golden Demon by the painting community. This period was characterised by an outburst of creativity and significant advances in painting and modelling techniques, partly due to the absence of other fantasy painting competitions that led to all fantasy painters gathering at Golden Demon. A lot of the winners from those years went on to become professional artists in the miniatures industry, and numerous Youngbloods winners during this period went on to win Slayer Swords in later years.

In 2003, two additional prizes were introduced. One was the Forge World Best of Show, which was awarded to the best painted piece produced by Forge World across all categories. The other one was the Fanatic Morning Star, which was awarded to the best painted model from the Specialist Games ranges. Fanatic Morning Star was dropped from 2004, but the Forge World award continued to be awarded until 2017, after which it was also discontinued.

=== The Warhammer Fest Years (2014-2023) ===
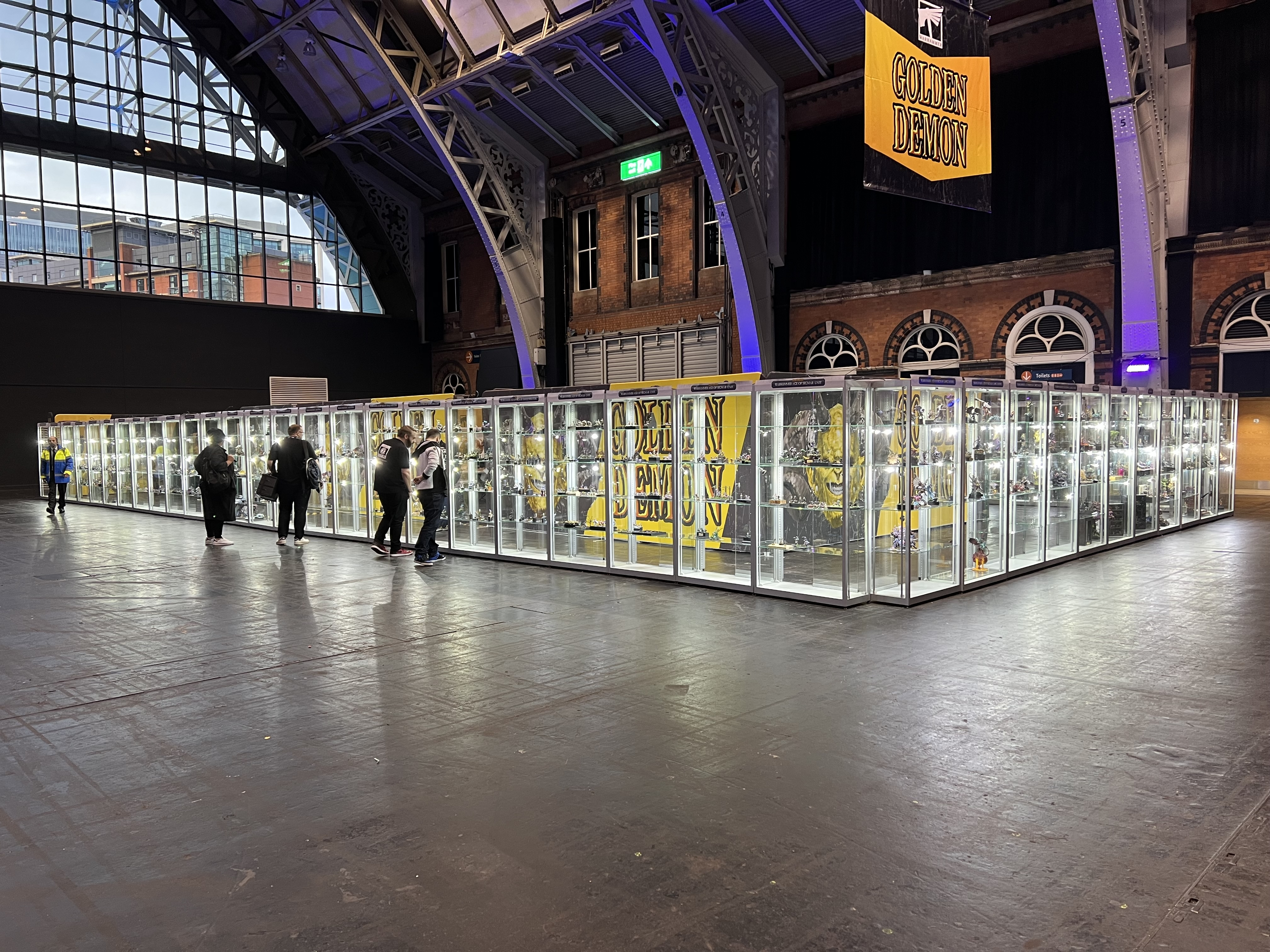
Golden Demon - Warhammer Fest 2023

In 2014, Games Workshop rebranded their premier event from Games Day to Warhammer Fest. Numerous changes were implemented to the event. Firstly, after 21 years of having taken place in Birmingham, Golden Demon left the city and moved to Coventry. Secondly, Warhammer Fest, and by extension Golden Demon, was now an event spanning the whole weekend, whereas hitherto Golden Demon had been a one-day affair.

Another important change for the younger entrants was that during this period the age of Youngbloods Competition was raised from 14 to 15.

Starting in the early 2010s, a tightening of Golden Demon's rules restrictions, notably in relation to base sizes and no longer permitting scratchbuilt models to be entered, coupled with the advent of alternative fantasy painting competitions, caused Golden Demon to decline significantly in popularity.

By the end of the decade, with Max Faleij as Head Judge, rules had been relaxed to allow for more creativity, insofar as entries still respected the ethos and lore of the Games Workshop universes. Base restrictions were lifted, the need for entries to be game legal was removed, and scratchbuilt models were allowed again. This led to a resurgence in popularity of the competition, which is today back in full health as proven by great attendances and participation in the post-pandemic events. The period of 2020-2021 saw the cancellation of Golden Demon due to the Covid19 pandemic (the only time, together with 2015, when Golden Demon had not been celebrated in the UK since its inception until 2023).

In 2022 Golden Demon returned after a 2-year hiatus and was held as a standalone event (which had not happened since 1994) at Games Workshop's Warhammer World in Nottingham. Alongside Golden Demon, an exhibition celebrating the 35th anniversary of the competition was also organised, showcasing winning entries from past editions.

In 2023 Warhammer Fest and Golden Demon moved to Manchester for the first time. It was the largest Golden Demon to have ever taken place, at least in terms of infrastructure, with more cabinets than ever before (more than 40). Single miniature categories boasted around 400 entries each. The awards ceremony is also widely regarded as one of the best to have ever taken place, in a dedicated theatre with a large capacity.

The UK competition's judges were selected from Games Workshop's ‘Eavy Metal painting team members, but were kept confidential.

=== The Independent Conventions Era (2024-Present) ===
Even though Golden Demon 2023 had been a great success in all aspects―from number of participants, quality of entries, and spectacularity of the awards ceremony―the Warhammer Fest event itself was a big disappointment among the attendees (mostly because engaging activities were severely lacking) and reportedly an economic flop. Albeit fans hoped that Games Workshop would improve on what had gone wrong, the company opted to abolish Warhammer Fest altogether and put an end to organising a premier event in-house (for the first time in 49 years, since the first Games Day was held in 1975)

Much to the relief of fans, with Golden Demon's popularity at an all-time high, Games Workshop decided to continue celebrating the painting competition as part of independent gaming conventions. This was in fact something that Games Workshop had already tried out in Poland and is still doing in the United States (see "International Golden Demon Competitions" section below), making the competition much easier to manage.

In Europe, the first such main Golden Demon event took place in 2024 as part of the Spiel Essen Game Fair in Germany, moving away from the UK for the first time and breaking away from decades of tradition. Furthermore, the famous ´Eavy Metal team members were banished from the judging panel, allegedly due to a new internal policy prohibiting Studio staff from partaking in events. This prompted a lot of complaints from the competition's fanbase, who objected that they would rather have their entries judged by professional painters―just like they had been in the previous 36 years of Golden Demon. To little avail, Games Workshop tried to mitigate the discontent by inviting a renowned painter from outside the company to serve as a guest judge on the panel, but public opinion largely remains that the return of ‘Eavy Metal to the judging panel is crucial to preserve the competition's esteemed reputation.

Ahead of Golden Demon 2024, Games Workshop unveiled updates to the competition categories, reintroducing 1990s classics like Necromunda and Blood Bowl, adding Old World and Horus Heresy categories to ease the congestion in the Fantasy and 40k Single categories, and merging fan favourites like Duel and Diorama (a decision that was reversed in 2025 following popular demand). Additional changes in the 2024 ruleset included the banning of collaboration entries between two or more artists (heretofore open to interpretation and not explicitly forbidden), the banning of a number of modern technologies―such as the 3D scanning of Games Workshop models or the use of Artificial Intelligence―and, for the first time in history, the banning of children aged 11 or lower from entering YoungBloods (but ironically not from the rest of Golden Demon categories).

== International Golden Demon Competitions ==
Throughout the years, Golden Demon competitions expanded to nine more countries in Europe, America, and Asia-Pacific, and were introduced in the following order: the United States (with multiple competitions across the country), Canada, France, Australia, Germany, Spain, Italy, Poland and Japan.

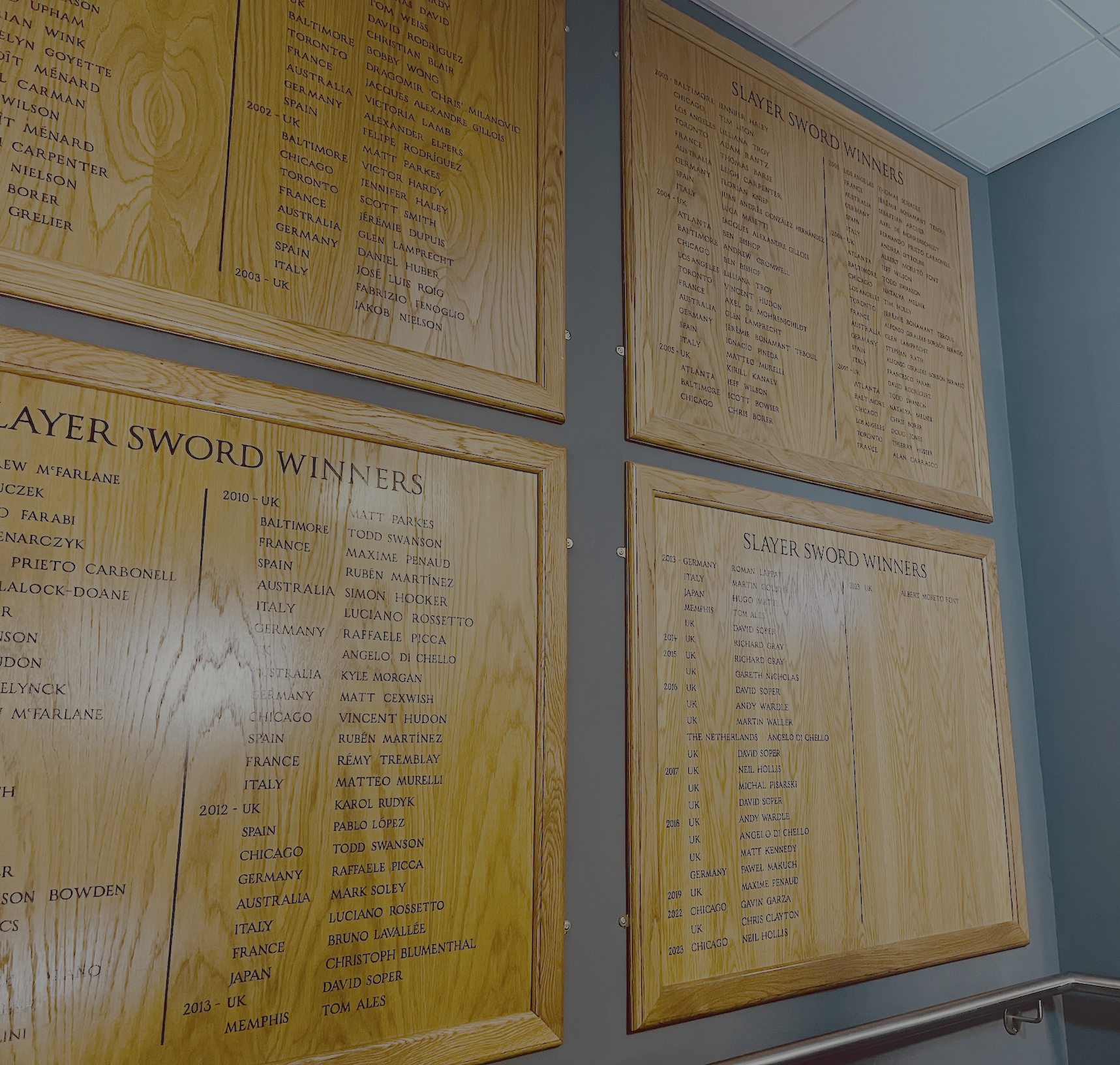
Honours Board at Warhammer World

The period between 2003 and 2008 was the one with the greatest number of Golden Demon competitions held in a natural year, with up to 11 competitions celebrated all over the world.

In some of the International Golden Demon competitions, such as in France or Spain, the Open Competition was considered a category of Golden Demon and not a separate competition. The winner of the Open category was therefore a contender to win the Slayer Sword―which indeed happened many times. In these cases, an additional 'Staff' category was put in place so that Games Workshop employees would be able to enter, and which was not eligible for the Slayer Sword.

By 2013, all international Golden Demon competitions had been cancelled by Games Workshop, and the competition continued to take place solely in the UK (except for a brief return of Golden Demon in Germany in 2018) until Golden Demon was brought back to the United States in 2022, after a hiatus of 9 years.

Currently, the competition has two legs, the European and the American one, taking place in Germany and the United States respectively with one competition in each country.

=== USA & Canada ===
The US and Canadian Golden Demon competitions were established in 1991. Two Golden Demon competitions were celebrated in the US, and one in Canada. These were held in the Laurel (Maryland), Santa Monica (California), and Toronto (Ontario) Games Workshop stores on 25th May 1991. The following year, in 1992, the US and Canadian Golden Demon competitions were celebrated jointly at the Baltimore Games Workshop store.

From 1993 onwards, Golden Demon was combined with Games Day. Games Day US continued to take place in Baltimore until 2010. In 2002 a second US Games Day was introduced in Chicago. In 2003 a third one in Los Angeles, and in 2004 a fourth one in Atlanta, all with their respective Golden Demon competitions.

From 2004 to 2007, some of the US Golden Demon competitions had as many as up to four categories dedicated exclusively to Games Workshop staff, unlike every other Golden Demon worldwide, where these could only enter either the Open Competition or one sole dedicated category.

Due to the distance people had to travel to get to Games Day in the US, the event stretched over two days. However, Golden Demon took place only on a Saturday, with the Awards Ceremony taking place on that afternoon.

The situation with four US Games Days continued for four years, and from 2008 they were gradually dropped one by one. In 2013 only one Games Day and Golden Demon took place in the US, in a new location in Memphis, Tennessee. The next 8 years saw no Golden Demon take place in the American continent until its return as part of Adepticon, held in Chicago between 2022-2024, and in Milwaukee from 2025 onwards.

In the American Golden Demon before its return in 2022, judges typically were the members from the Design Studio that had been invited to attend the American Games Day. For example, in 1996 the judges were Jervis Johnson, Aly Morrison and Robin Dews.

Meanwhile, in Canada, Golden Demon returned to Toronto (Mississauga) in 2001, ten years after the first edition, and it continued to be celebrated as part of Games Day Canada until 2009.

=== France ===
France was the second European country where Golden Demon was celebrated. The first Golden Demon in France took place in 1997 in Paris, alongside the French Games Day. It continued to be celebrated in Paris, and later in nearby Saint-Denis, until 2012.

The French Slayer Sword winner was invited to be part of the judging panel in the following year's Golden Demon. This was perceived as the highest honour by competitors.

During some years, like in 2006, previous Slayer Sword winners were only allowed to enter the Prestige Category to make room for new faces on the podiums, making it a particularly hotly contested category.

The French Golden Demon was widely regarded to be the one with the highest level together with the British Golden Demon. It welcomed and celebrated scratchbuilt models more than any other Golden Demon did, and implemented abidance to the lore with more elasticity than in Britain, where this was controlled more strictly.

=== Australia ===
Golden Demon was introduced to Australia in 1998, and it took place in Sydney's Darling Harbour Convention Centre, alongside Games Day Australia, until 2004.

In the mid 2000s, entrants were only allowed to enter a maximum of three categories, plus the Open Competition. Games Workshop staff were also allowed to enter the regular categories, but were not eligible to win the Slayer Sword.

Between 2005-2010 the system was modified, and Golden Demon was run through qualifiers in store rounds. The best three in each category in each store gained a place in the regional finals, and the best three from the regionals in each category gained a place in the national finals, which took place at Sydney's Games Workshop flagship store.

Starting in 2007, the Australian Golden Demon included an 'Intermediate' category. This category was open to painters aged 15–17 (and later 18) and combined both Warhammer Fantasy and Warhammer 40,000 miniatures.

From 2010, the Australian Golden Demon also included 'The Lost Demon' category, which only accepted models manufactured between 1977 and 1999.

In 2011 regional heats were still in place, but the finalists were taken to Games Day, which had been reintroduced in the country. This was reminiscent of how Golden Demon had originally been run in the early days in the UK.

2012 was the last Australian Golden Demon, and it was celebrated at Games Day without regional heats.

=== Germany ===
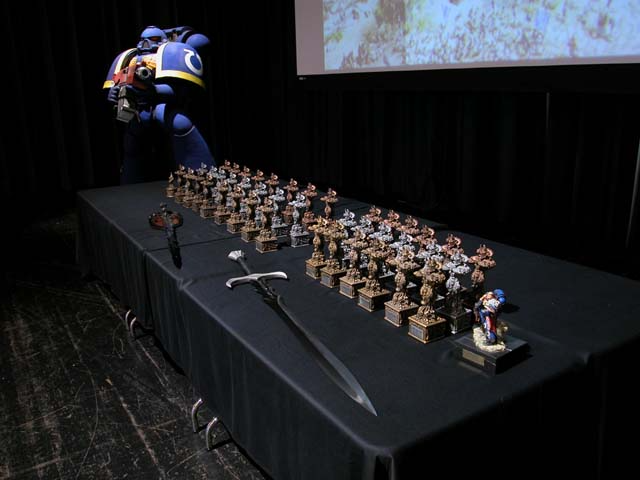
Golden Demon Germany in the mid 2000s

Golden Demon was introduced to Germany in 1999, as part of Games Day Germany. It was celebrated in Cologne, and it continued to be held there until 2013. Like in France, the Slayer Sword winner in Germany was invited as judge the following year. Golden Demon briefly returned to Germany in 2018 as part of Warhammer Fest Europe. It took place in Düsseldorf.

In 2024, Golden Demon made its return once again to Germany, but the event's target audience has shifted significantly. Unlike the previous German Golden Demon, which was the localised version of the competition tailored to German painters and held alongside the main UK event and other international editions, the current event in Germany is the only Golden Demon being celebrated in Europe. As a result, while it is physically hosted in Germany, this iteration effectively serves as "Golden Demon Europe", and hence is it discussed in detail in the main section of this article (see: "The Independent Conventions Era" section above).

=== Spain ===
In 2000, Golden Demon was introduced in Spain. It was celebrated in Barcelona, where it continued to be held until 2012, except for years 2009-2011 when it took place in Madrid.

Until 2003, Golden Demon Spain only awarded Gold trophies, a single winner per category with three or four finalists who were awarded a certificate.

In 2004, Silver and Bronze trophies were introduced but only for three categories (Single WFB, Single WH40k, and Open). It was not until 2006 that the full gamut of three trophies per category was fully implemented in the Spanish competition. Because of this, the total number of Golden Demon trophies awarded in Spain is relatively low in relation to the number of Golden Demon competitions that were celebrated in the country.

=== Italy ===
Golden Demon was introduced to Italy in 2002 as part of the Italian Games Day. It continued to be celebrated in the country until 2013, after which the event was dropped as part of Games Workshop's cancellation of Games Days worldwide. Golden Demon Italy was celebrated in Milan until 2006, and thereafter in Modena until its last event.

=== Poland ===
Golden Demon took place in Poland in 2007 and 2008, in Warsaw and Zielona Góra respectively. As opposed to all other Golden Demon competitions, and until the arrival of Golden Demon as part of Adepticon and Spiel Essen Game Fair, Golden Demon Poland was the first and only Golden Demon that was organised as part of an event not run by Games Workshop (the Polcon Convention).

=== Japan ===
Like in Poland, Golden Demon was celebrated only two years in Japan, in 2012 and 2013. It was run as a standalone event, and it took place at Games Workshop's Japan Headquarters in Jimbocho, Tokyo.

Golden Demon Japan was very poorly attended, and was one of the smallest Golden Demon competitions to have ever taken place. It was much closer to a local store painting competition, and a small one at that, than to a Golden Demon.

Because of Japanese legislation, Games Workshop wasn't allowed to award a sword to the Best of Show winner, and instead of awarding an alternative trophy, the winner received a piece of cardboard with a printed Slayer Sword, becoming an internet meme among the painting community.

== 'Mini Demons' ==
In 2015, under the initiative of Alan Merrett, who had been Head Judge at Golden Demon throughout the mid-2000's, a number of smaller, themed Golden Demon competitions were introduced, in addition to the regular Golden Demon competition. The first one was 'Golden Demon Tanks' which took place on 1st August 2015.

These competitions, which came to be popularly known as 'Mini Demons' took place exclusively at Warhammer World in Nottingham, except for 2016 when it took place in the Netherlands as part of the European Open Day.

'Mini Demons' consistently suffered from extremely poor attendance, sometimes with only three entries per category, guaranteeing a win to the entrants by just attending. This created tensions within Games Workshop's Studio as well as amidst fans of the competition, who heavily criticised the 'Mini Demons' for grossly adulterating the significance of winning a Golden Demon trophy or a Slayer Sword.

In 2017, in an attempt to quell the criticisms, Games Workshop tried to reinforce the difference between the 'Mini Demons' and the normal Golden Demon by relabelling the latter as 'Classic Golden Demon' and announced that in order to differentiate the Classic Slayer Sword from the ones awarded at the 'Mini Demons', the former would be coated in gold. This however never happened, and the 2017 winner was awarded a conventional steel Slayer Sword. Instead, the 'Mini Demons' simply stopped awarding a Slayer Sword during their last years.

Given the relentless discontent around the 'Mini Demons', Games Workshop decided to cancel them after 2018.

== The Trophies ==
=== Golden Demon Statues ===
When Golden Demon was established, Games Workshop wanted their own awards to present to the worthy winners, and decided to use an impish, horned demon figure posed with its arms crossed over its chest, reminiscent of the Oscars. It was called Golden Demon, namesake of the competition.

The demon itself, named Azaroth, pre-dates the Golden Demon competition. Azaroth was the cover star of Citadel Colour marketing in the mid 1980s, before being depicted in the Oscars pose for the competition.

The trophy has developed over the years, with six different iterations since its inception.

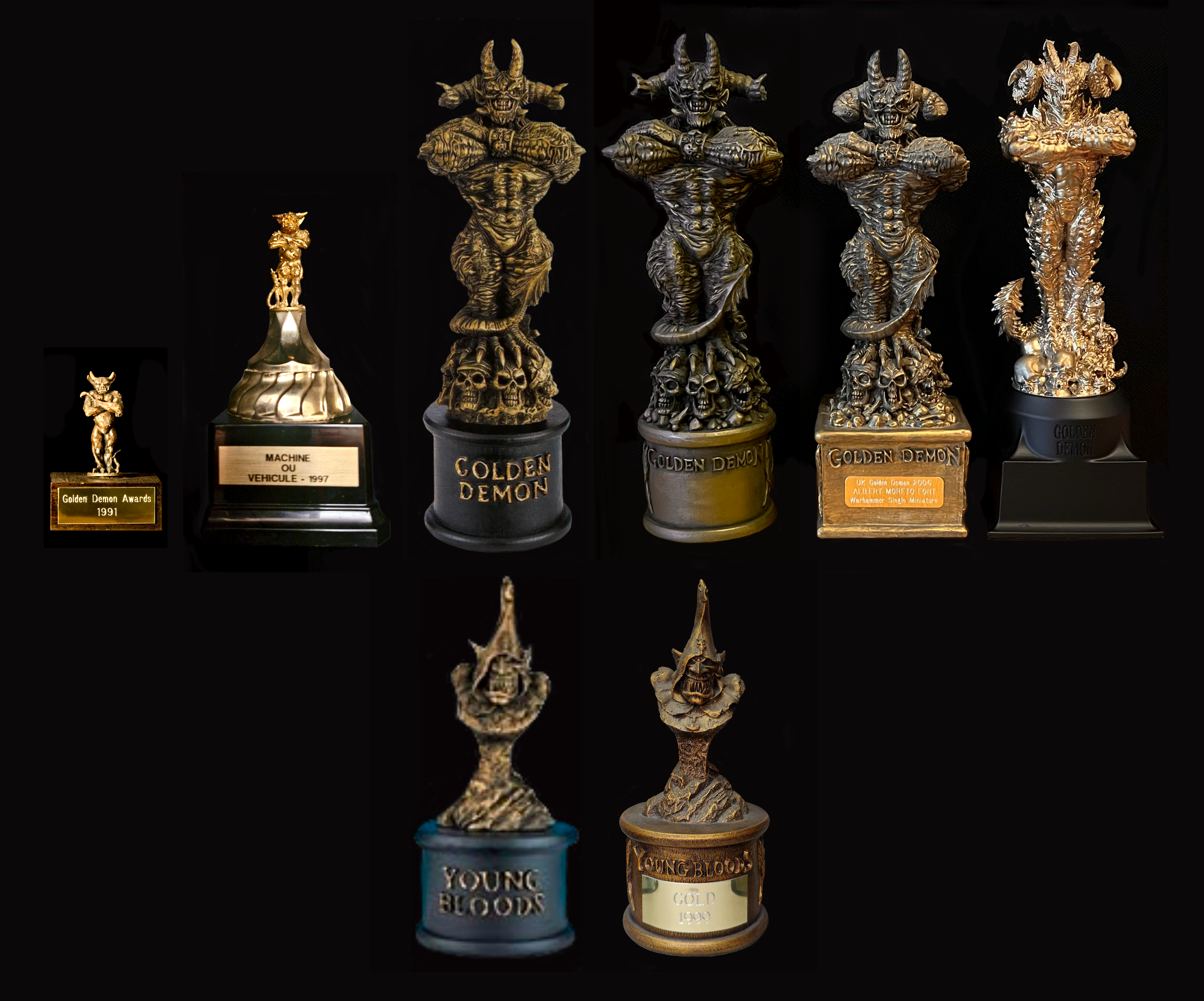
Golden Demon and Youngbloods Trophies Evolution

- The first version of the trophy (awarded 1987-1992) was designed by Nick Bibby. It was cast in metal, measured around 5cm tall, and was electroplated in Gold, Silver and Bronze, with marble (and later wooden) bases with an engraved plate.
- The second version of the trophy (awarded 1993-1997), also cast in metal, was similarly sized to the first version and was coated in the same fashion, but the statue itself was an updated sculpt by Trish Morrison.
- The trophy was completely redesigned for its third iteration (awarded in 1998). Sculpted by Forge World sculptor Craig Davidson, the statue was made much larger (over 20cm) and was cast in resin instead of metal. Games Workshop stopped electroplating the trophies and started painting them in the respective awarding colours. The cylindrical black base was a separate element from the actual demon statue, which proved problematic as the statue was prone to becoming detached.
- This was solved in the fourth iteration of the trophy (awarded 1999-2002), which kept the same design but cast the base and trophy as one single piece.
- The fifth version (awarded 2003-2019) was again the same design from 1998 but it replaced the cylindrical base with a square one, to make it easier to attach the labels on a flat surface.
- The sixth and current version (awarded 2022-present) is a brand-new statue, sculpted by Seb Perbet. The statue and the base are again two separate parts, and detaching problems have occurred. For the first time, the Gold trophy is different in shape from the Silver and Bronze, with longer horns to symbolise the greater accolade.

Occasionally, trophies different from the traditional statues have been awarded to the winners. In 1993, the winner of Single 40K in the UK was awarded a dagger instead of a Golden Demon statue. Similarly, in the US Golden Demon, Citadel miniatures coated in Gold, Silver and Bronze were awarded instead of a Golden Demon statue during some years in the mid-1990's. These were selected from the appropriate ranges (e.g. a Dreadnought for 40k vehicle, Morg´N´Thorg for Blood Bowl, etc.)

Until 1990, cash prizes were also awarded in the UK to the winners alongside their trophies.

=== Slayer Sword ===
The Slayer Sword is a two-handed leafblade broadsword, and it is awarded to the overall winner of Golden Demon, selected from among the Gold winners of each category.

For over twenty years, from 1987 until 2008, the Slayer Sword was around 125cm long to the tip of the pommel.

- In 1987, the first Slayer Sword was forged by Pendragon Armourers of Chesterfield.
- From 1988-1993 the Slayer Sword was forged by Raven Armoury of Essex.
- In 1995 the Slayer Sword was forged by Hodgsons Forge of Norfolk.
- In 1996 it was forged by Wilkinson Sword of Acton, London. The 1996 Slayer Sword was unique in that it was a historical sword based on a real 17th century design, as opposed to the traditional fantasy-style blade.
- In 1997 the Slayer Sword was again a historical design, this time a Scottish Claymore, though the manufacturer is unknown.
- From 1998-2008, the Slayer Sword was again forged by Raven Armoury, the longest-serving suppliers of swords to Games Workshop to date.

Breaking away from decades of tradition sourcing the Slayer Sword from British swordsmiths, in 2009 Games Workshop stopped awarding a hand-forged sword, and until present they have been awarding a non-beveled, props-like sword with blunt edges.

- From 2009-2022, the Slayer Sword was an industrial sheet metal cutout sword sourced from China, of unknown manufacturer.
- From 2023 until present, the sword remains a non-beveled props sword with blunt edges, manufactured by Baltimore Knife and Sword Co. in the United States.

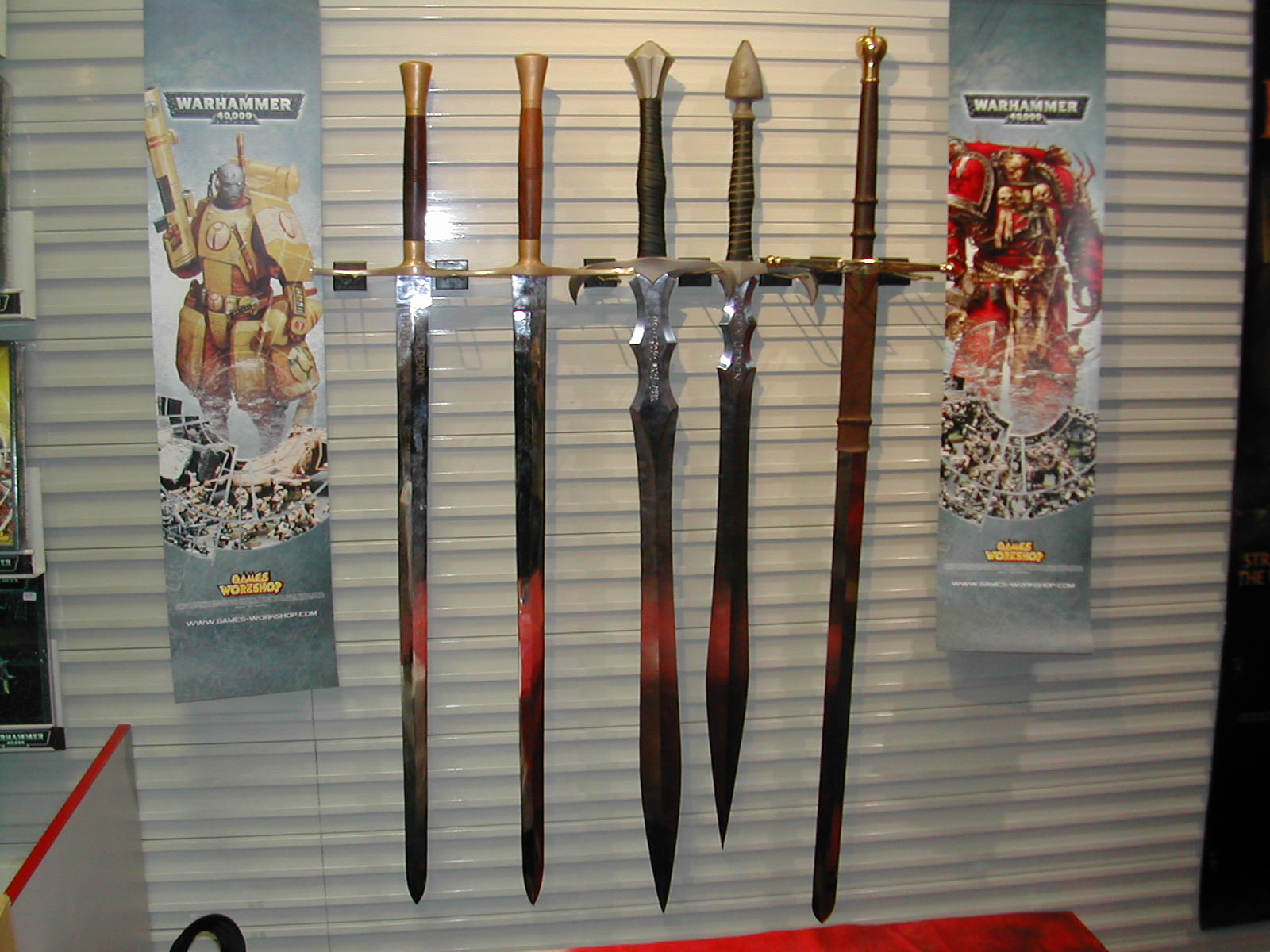
A variety of Slayer Swords from France, UK and Germany displayed at GW Nantes

Slayer Swords for the International Golden Demon competitions were manufactured by a variety of companies, with varying degrees of quality and authenticity. In Spain, it was sourced from Toledo, a city with a long history of swordsmithing, though it was a decorative sword and not a real weapon, unlike the original UK sword.

In France, the Slayer Sword was a historical medieval sword. In Poland, the Slayer Sword was a Polish Szabla.

Outside Europe, a number of alternative trophies have on occasion been awarded in place of the Slayer Sword: Imperial Ultramarine Commander Lord Macragge's Helmet (USA 1992), Slayer Axe (Chicago 2002), Slayer Shield (Australia 2004), and paper Slayer Sword (Japan 2012).

In the Games Workshop lore, the Slayer Sword was forged by the ‘Undead, Mind-Flaying Greater Balrog Demons of the Fiery Inner Sanctum of the Lords of the 26 Furies of the Lesser Stench’.

=== Open Competition and Youngbloods Competition Trophies ===
The Open Competition and Youngbloods Competition are separate competitions running alongside Golden Demon. They are not eligible for the Slayer Sword and are awarded different trophies to the Golden Demon legendary statue.

In 2002 the Open competition trophy was a Griffon statue, and between 2005-2007 it was a crystal stand. Since at least 2010, winners of the Open Competition receive a wooden plaque with a relief of the Citadel castle in Gold, Silver or Bronze finishes.

Meanwhile, since 1998 winners of the Youngbloods Competition receive a trophy featuring a night goblin bust, also coloured with the respective awarded metal.

=== Notable, Commended, and Finalist Entries ===
Traditionally, at both Golden Demon, the Open Competition and Youngbloods Competition, there was one single level of awards below the podium, called Finalist Entries, for those who had made the 'first cut'. The top three winners were selected from among this group.

In the mid 2010s a 'second cut' qualifiers level was added above Finalist, named Commended, from which the top three winners were selected.

In 2024, a third level was added. The 'first cut' winners now received a Notable Entry award, while the Finalist award was upgraded to 'second cut' winners, and the Commended award to 'third cut' winners. In 2025, this three level structure was maintained, but the naming for second and third cut awards were swapped to align them with semantics, effectively bringing Finalist at the top again like it had been in the past. Today, the structure of awards below the podium is as follows:

1. Notable Entry pins (bronze pins), awarded to everyone who makes the first cut.
2. Commended Entry pins (silver pins), awarded to everyone who makes the second cut.
3. Finalist Entry pins (gold pins), awarded to everyone who makes the third cut. The top three demon trophies are selected from amongst the Finalist Entries.

== Awards Ceremony ==
At least from 1995 and until 2019, after judges had completed the (then final) Second Cut qualifiers, the top three winners in each category were separated from the rest of the entries and placed in a separate winners cabinet or on the top shelf of the display cabinets. In later years, this led to waning attendances at the awards ceremony, as some of the entrants who had not placed in the top three would collect their miniatures and go back home.

In 2022 this was revised, and the three winners are now not separated from the rest of Finalist entries. During the awards ceremony, all Finalist artists for each category are called on stage, after which the top three winners are announced. This is done to celebrate the efforts of all Finalist painters, irrespective of whether they end up winning one of the trophies or not.

At the end of the awards ceremony, all Gold winners are called back on stage, after which the Slayer Sword is awarded for the best-painted miniature in the competition. Following an incident in the 2006 awards ceremony when the winner cut his fingers on stage while holding the sword aloft, since 2007 the winner has been asked to put on a chainmail glove before lifting the sword. In practice, this is unnecessary as the current Slayer Sword is not a sharpened blade.

Until the late 2000s, all Golden Demon winners were invited to Games Workshop in Nottingham and were given a tour of the Design Studio, and were taken better pictures of the awarded miniatures. This is not done anymore.

== Honours ==
An honours board of all Slayer Sword winners is maintained at Games Workshop's Warhammer World exhibition centre in Nottingham, where winning models are also often showcased.

As of November 2025, 166 classic Slayer Swords have been awarded to 109 distinct painters.

Year	UK	USA					Canada	France	Australia	Germany	Spain	Italy	Poland	Japan
Year	UK	Baltimore	Los Angeles	Chicago	Atlanta	Memphis	Canada	France	Australia	Germany	Spain	Italy	Poland	Japan
1987	Brian Moore													
1988	Ivan Bartleet													
1989	Steve Blunt													
1990	David Soper													
1991	Paul Robins	unknown	unknown				unknown							
1992	Paul Robins	Mark Dance												
1993	Paul McCarthy	Mark Dance												
1994	Neil R Thomason	unknown												
1995	Matt Parkes	Jeff Wilhelm												
1996	Neil R Thomason	David Upham												
1997	Adrian Wink	Jocelyn Goyette						Benoît Ménard						
1998	Nigel Carman	Jeff Wilson						Benoît Ménard	Leigh Carpenter					
1999	Jakob Rune Nielsen	Chris Borer						Bruno Grelier	Paul Cairncross	Michael Jacobsen				
2000	Matt Parkes	Victor Hardy						Thomas David	Glen Lamprecht	Tom Weiss	David Rodríguez			
2001	Christian Blair	Bobby Wong					Dragomir Milanovic	Jacques-Alexandre Gillois	Victoria Lamb	Alexander Elpus	Felipe Rodríguez			
2002	Matt Parkes	Victor Hardy		Jennifer Haley			Scott Smith	Jérémie Dupuis	Glen Lamprecht	Daniel Huber	José Luis Roig Ayuso	Fabrizio Fenoglio		
2003	Jakob Rune Nielsen	Jennifer Haley	Lilliana Troy	Tim Lison			Adam Rantz	Thomas Barse	Leigh Carpenter	Florian Kniep	Juan Andrés González	Luca Masetti		
2004	Jacques-Alexandre Gillois	Andrew Cromwell	Lilliana Troy	Ben Bishop	Ben Bishop		Vincent Hudon	Axel de Mohrenschildt	Glen Lamprecht	Jérémie Bonamant	Iago Pineda	Matteo Murelli		
2005	Kirill Kanaev	Scott Bowser	Thomas Schadle	Chris Borer	Jeff Wilson			Jérémie Bonamant	Sebastian Archer	Axel de Mohrenschildt	Fernando Prieto	Andrea Ottolini		
2006	Albert Moretó Font	Todd Swanson	Tim Holly	Natalya Melnik	Jeff Wilson		Jérémie Bonamant	Alfonso Giraldes	Glen Lamprecht	Stephan Rath	Alfonso Giraldes	Francesco Farabi		
2007	David Rodríguez	Natalya Melnik	Doug Jones	Chris Borer	Todd Swanson		Vincent Hudon	Allan Carrasco	Luke McFarlane	Sascha Buczek		Francesco Farabi	Michał Lenarczyk	
2008	Fernando Prieto	Bennett Blalock-Doane	Todd Swanson	Chris Borer			Thierry Husser	David Waeselynck	Luke McFarlane	Ben Komets	Jaume Ortiz	Stephan Rath	Ben Komets	
2009	Ben Jarvis	Dylan Gauker		Jeffrey Bowden			Arnold Kovacs	Ben Komets	Sebastian Archer	Stephan Rath	Javier González	Andrea Ottolini		
2010	Matt Parkes	Todd Swanson						Maxime Penaud	Simon Hooker	Raffaele Picca	Rubén Martínez	Luciano Rossetto		
2011	Angelo di Chello			Vincent Hudon				Rémy Tremblay	Kyle Morgan	Matt Cexwish	Rubén Martínez	Matteo Murelli		
2012	Karol Rudyk			Todd Swanson				Bruno Lavallée	Mark Soley	Raffaele Picca	Pablo López Jimeno	Luciano Rossetto		Christoph Blumenthal
2013	David Soper					Tom Ales				Roman Lappat		Martin Goumaz		Hugo Matte
2014	Richard Gray													
2015														
2016	David Soper													
2017	Michał Pisarski													
2018	Angelo di Chello									Paweł Makuch				
2019	Maxime Penaud													
2020														
2021														
2022	Chris Clayton			Gavin Garza										
2023	Albert Moretó Font			Neil Hollis										
2024				Alexandre Dos Santos						David Perryman				
2025				Borja Calvo						Albert Moretó Font				
2026				David Arroba										

== Records & Trivia ==
- The painters who have won the most classic Slayer Swords are:
  - In America, Todd Swanson, with 5 swords.
  - In Europe, Matt Parkes, with 4 swords.
  - In Australia, Glen Lamprecht, with 4 swords.
- At the trophy level, Angelo Di Chello is the most decorated painter in the history of Golden Demon, having won 67 classic trophies across various countries.
- The youngest Slayer Sword winner is Iago Pineda, who won the 2004 Spanish Slayer Sword aged 15, just one year after winning Youngbloods.
- Albert Moreto Font and Neil R Thomason hold the record for most consecutive Golds in the same category, winning four Golds in Single Fantasy/AOS Miniature from 2022 to 2025 and Single 40k Miniature from 1993 to 1996, respectively. Two of the four Golds also won the Slayer Sword for both painters (2023 and 2025 in the case of Font and 1994 and 1996 in the case of Thomason).
- Ben Komets holds the record for most Forge World Best of Show awards, with 4 trophies.
- Among painters with multiple wins, Rubén Martínez is the most effective awardee, having won Gold 100% of times he entered (3), and the Slayer Sword on 2/3 of the occasions (in Spain).
- The Australian and the Spanish Golden Demon competitions are the only ones where the Slayer Sword has only been won by nationals of the host country.

== Entry Guidelines ==
- All models entered must have been produced by Games Workshop (including all Citadel Miniatures, all Forge World releases, and any other specialist game produced by Games Workshop). Conversions (using components from Games Workshop kits) and scratchbuilt entries are allowed as long as they are in scale and set thematically within one of Games Workshop's worlds or universes.
- Entries may be mounted either on a gaming base or a display base of appropriate size.
- Entries must be registered on the day, by the person who painted them – no one else can hand your entry in for you.
- Each participant may only enter each category once, but as many categories as they want.
- Each entry must have an accompanying entry form filled out and handed in at registration. This can be downloaded in advance, but will also be available at the event.
- Entries that didn't place (a Gold, Silver, or Bronze trophy) in any previous Golden Demon competition may be entered again.
- Entry to any of the competitions gives Games Workshop the right to photograph and publish details of models entered as they see fit.

== The Categories ==
In 2025, the Golden Demon Category List has been announced to be as follows:

1. Warhammer 40,000 Single Miniature
2. Warhammer 40,000 Unit or Kill Team
3. Warhammer 40,000 Large Model or Vehicle
4. Age of Sigmar Single Miniature
5. Age of Sigmar Unit, Warcry Warband, or Underworlds Warband
6. Age of Sigmar Large Model or War Machine
7. The Horus Heresy
8. Warhammer The Old World
9. Middle-Earth
10. Blood Bowl
11. Necromunda
12. Epic Scale
13. Diorama
14. Duel
15. Youngbloods Competition
16. Open Competition

== Judging Criteria ==
Overall, the judges look for well-painted models that adhere to the imagery and ethos of the worlds represented in the fictional worlds of Warhammer and Warhammer 40,000. The judges look for many different qualities in a winning entry, including technical skill, atmosphere, consistency in quality, and how well the entry fits in Games Workshop's different worlds and universes.

Entries do not need to be game legal. Judges look for narrative and descriptive pieces that bring the worlds of Warhammer to life.

The painting isn't just about technical prowess, but about applying it with care. The judges have no set preference when it comes to style.

== Golden Demon In Popular Culture ==
At the end of the 1998 film 'Enemy of the State', Robert Clayton Dean's son is seen reading about Golden Demon in a White Dwarf magazine.
