= Dicing with Dragons =

1982 book by Ian Livingstone

- Author: Ian Livingstone
- Genre: Role-playing games
- Publisher: Routledge & Kegan Paul
- Publication date: 1982

Dicing with Dragons is a book written by Ian Livingstone and published by Routledge & Kegan Paul in 1982 that explains what role-playing games are.

== Contents ==
Dicing with Dragons is an introduction to the then-new world of role-playing games. Livingstone explains how role-playing games work, and includes a solo adventure, "Eye of the Dragon", as an example. Livingstone then details the major role-playing systems that dominated the market in 1982:

- Dungeons & Dragons
- RuneQuest
- Traveller
- Tunnels & Trolls

He also briefly describes 31 other role-playing games, including Boot Hill, Bushido, Call of Cthulhu, Gamma World, Gangbusters, and Top Secret.

There are also chapters on:

- Accessories, including summaries of adventures for the role-playing games previously mentioned, and magazines and fanzines specializing in role-playing games
- How to paint miniature figures
- How to be a gamemaster
- Computer systems and computer games that were available in 1982
- Descriptions of several live action games that would later evolve into Live action role-playing games (LARPs)

== Publication history ==
Dicing with Dragons was written by Ian Livingstone, with illustrations by Russ Nicholson, and was published by Routledge & Kegan Paul (U.K.) and by the New American Library in 1983, with a 2nd U.S. edition by Signet in 1986.

Geraldine Cooke, an editor at Puffin Books, was looking to revive the firm's moribund science fiction, fantasy and horror collection. A friend told her about a new store in Hammersmith called Games Workshop that specialized in role-playing games. After meeting with the owners, Steve Jackson and Ian Livingstone, she asked them to write a book exploring the role-playing industry. The book they gave her instead was an actual role-playing adventure called Warlock of Firetop Mountain, eventually published under the Puffin Books imprint, the first of many very popular Fighting Fantasy books.

Ian Livingstone did write the originally requested book about role-playing, Dicing with Dragons, but it was published in the U.K. by Routledge & Kegan Paul in 1982, not Penguin.

The illustrations, almost all of them square, were created by Russ Nicholson. The artist later explained that Jackson and Livingstone had requested the square format for Warlock of Firetop Mountain, and Livingstone wanted the same format used in this book.

In 1983, Dicing with Dragons was published in the United States by Plume, an imprint of New American Library.

In 1986, an Italian translation, Giocare a dadi col drago, was published by Milanese publisher Longanesi; the Italian edition included a new preface written by Giampaolo Dossena.

== Reception ==
In the February 1983 edition of White Dwarf (Issue #38), M L Rowland was impressed by Dicing with Dragons, calling it "probably the most complete summary of the role-playing hobby available, and well worth buying for its appendices alone." Rowland concluded with a strong recommendation, giving the book an excellent rating of 9 out of 10.

In the April 1983 edition of Imagine (Issue 1), Dave Pringle commented that "In addition to covering all the familiar RPG ground, this book contains a useful chapter on computer games. Recommended."

In a 2014 retrospective review, Pornokitsch stated that "Livingstone's Dicing with Dragons is interesting because it is so dated – a peek at the formative years of role playing games."

== Reviews ==
- Fantasy Review, October 1984
