= Owl and Weasel =

Game newsletter

- Editor: Steve Jackson and Ian Livingstone
- Categories: Roleplaying, Wargames, Board Games
- Frequency: Monthly (with a two-month gap for Gen Con IX)
- First issue: February 1975
- Final issue Number: April 1977; 25
- Company: Games Workshop
- Country: United Kingdom
- Website: Games-Workshop.com

Owl and Weasel was a newsletter for board gamers, role-playing gamers and wargamers, published in London, England, by Games Workshop. 25 issues were published from February 1975 until April 1977. It was edited by Steve Jackson and Ian Livingstone. Owl and Weasel was superseded by White Dwarf.

== Title ==
The "cultishly-monikered" title of the publication has been called a mystery by the co-editors, although anthropomorphism may have been a factor. In a 2009 interview, Steve Jackson stated that "it represented the characteristics you need to be a good games player: wise like an owl and crafty like a weasel", although this explanation had not been given in any previous editorial or interview.

== History ==
The publication was initially launched to complement Games Workshop's business of producing hand-crafted wooden board games. The magazine issued a challenge to British game producers to match the efforts of U.S. and German game producers. Copies of early issues were sent speculatively to anyone within the industry to generate business, nurture longer-term connections and build partnerships.

Owl and Weasel #6: Dungeons & Dragons special issue

The sixth issue, a key point in Games Workshop's early history, was released as a Dungeons & Dragons special – a first in the UK – and issues #11 and #23 doubled as programmes for their early Games Days, leading to coverage in The Times of these events and of their magazine.

The editors had expected that the publication would run on beyond issue #25 (in #23, for Games Day II, results for a competition were to be announced in #27), but it was soon decided that a more professional image was required to keep up with TSR's transition of their first periodical, The Strategic Review, into the "glossy" roleplaying and wargaming magazines, Dragon and Little Wars.

Although Owl and Weasel's circulation would be considered tiny by modern standards, having only exceeded 200, including 80 direct sales through hobby shops, by early 1976, its influence in expanding what were previously niche hobbies into the general British marketplace dominated by traditional games was considerable, and it played a key role in setting up Games Workshop for an extended period of rapid growth.

== Content ==
The first few issues covered mostly traditional games, wargaming and postal games. It attempted to create a games club and provide an alternative source for game news with a scope set as wide as possible. Later issues provided coverage of fantasy and role-playing games in general.

In the beginning, the promotion of Games Workshop's hand-crafted games boards was supplemented by reselling used wargames and small press games. Marketing of fantasy and science fiction games was expanded by an exclusive deal with TSR in mid-1975. After Livingstone and Jackson returned from Gen Con IX in August 1976, the marketing expanded even further. At Gen Con, they signed up additional exclusive European distribution rights for many American publishers that were still at an early stage of their development, in part due to the apparent absence of any other European companies from that convention. Traditional boardgames such as Monopoly and Scrabble, whilst continuing to be covered even after the expansion, were never sold through the magazine.

Although D&D, as the first modern-day commercial role-playing game, had been introduced to Britain no later than Autumn 1974, such playing groups and societies as existed within Britain were still on a local basis by 1975 or early 1976, sometimes co-existing with traditional wargaming societies. The aforementioned exclusive deal with TSR gave Games Workshop increased impetus to promote their flagship product through the creation of a nationwide D&D society, which they carried out through the pages of Owl and Weasel.

The society was first proposed in issue #9, and was operating by issue #12. This further increased the role-playing content of the publication, which had previously included variant rules and short essays on rules and gameplay. Although D&D society members provided tournaments for conventions such as Games Day, this arrangement was not as formal as TSR's RPGA was later.

In addition to promoting early postal D&D gaming, Owl and Weasel facilitated other postal fantasy games co-ordinated by veteran Diplomacy aficionado Don Turnbull, later of TSR (UK). Turnbull had recently been the inaugural inductee to the Origins Hall of Fame for his work on postal gaming, having started the first British postal diplomacy magazine in 1969. Further articles on game mechanics by Turnbull were accompanied by contributions from other well-known hobbyists such as Hartley Patterson and Lew Pulsipher, as well as introducing new contributors whose works continued to be printed in Games Workshop's subsequent publication, White Dwarf.

== Editors ==
Editorial responsibilities were shared between Steve Jackson and Ian Livingstone on an issue-by-issue basis. The first couple of issues were edited by Jackson. Later issues were usually edited by Livingstone. This trend continued until Livingstone became the lead editor for the first 74 issues of White Dwarf.

== Reception ==
In the February 1976 edition of The Strategic Review (Issue #6), Gary Gygax thought the zine's 4 in × 5 in (100 mm × 130 mm) format was rather small, but said "the printing is good". He found it to be "a newsy item, with LOTS of games plugged, mentioned, advertised, etc." On a scale from "Major Tragedy" to "Major Triumph", Gygax rated it a Triumph.

== Reviews ==
- Perfidious Albion #6 (p17)
