= Eureka! (video game) =

1984 video game

- Developers: Andromeda Software; Novotrade
- Publisher: Domark
- Writer: Ian Livingstone
- Platforms: Commodore 64, ZX Spectrum
- Release: 1984
- Genre: Interactive fiction
- Mode: Single-player

Eureka! is a video game for the Commodore 64 and ZX Spectrum computers, written by Ian Livingstone, developed by Novotrade for Andromeda Software and published by Domark in 1984.

== Gameplay ==
Eureka! is a text adventure set in European history. It consists of five parts, each of which has to be loaded and played separately. The first four parts can be played in any order, but the fifth part can only be played after all the other parts have been completed.

The parts are:

1. Prehistoric Europe: Set in a valley somewhere in the Jurassic period. You have to escape from the valley and avoid hungry dinosaurs.
2. Ancient Rome: Set in ancient Rome somewhere around the 1st or 2nd century BC. You have to escape from slavery and win a horse race at the Circus Maximus.
3. Arthurian Britain: Set in medieval Britain during King Arthur's time. You have to foil the evil Mordred's plans.
4. Wartime Germany: Set in Germany during World War II. You have to escape a prisoner of war camp back to your own country.
5. Modern Caribbean: Set in the Caribbean in the 1980s. You finally confront your nemesis in his island-based stronghold and have to stop him from conquering the world.

At the start of Modern Caribbean, the game asks questions from each of the first four parts. You have to answer every question correctly to start the fifth part of the game.

The plots in Eureka! are somewhat clichéd and the parser is very simplistic, usually limited to one verb and one object per command. Some rooms in the game have pictures representing them and sometime small animations.

Unusually for text adventures, Eureka! maintains RPG-style hit points for your character. These hit points are lowered when your character is injured or raised when he gets something to eat. If the hit points reach 0, your character dies.

Another feature of the game was the rooms that had a time limit, which meant the player had to act quickly to complete a task or to quickly exit the area.

The main text adventure was also accompanied by "arcade game" versions of the five parts. These were very simple affairs, where your character ran around a Pac-Man-style maze avoiding enemies. Apart from the maze layout and the graphics, all five parts were pretty much identical. Earning a high enough score would reward the player extra hit points in the adventure games, when loaded right after the arcade game.

At the start of Arthurian Britain the wind blows a theme from Franz Liszt's Les Préludes.

== Prize challenge ==
When the game was originally published, Domark promised a prize of £25,000 to the first player to solve the entire game before December 31, 1985. The prize was eventually won by Matthew Woodley, a teenager from the UK. Woodley would eventually go on to work for Domark.

== Reception ==
Kath Bilgora reviewed Eureka! for White Dwarf #60, giving it an overall rating of 9 out of 10, and stated that "Without having seen the full package, my impression is that this should provide a sustained challenge for the experienced adventure gamer, and a complex and absorbing introduction to the complete novice."

== Sales figures ==
About 15,000 copies of both versions of the game (Commodore 64 and ZX Spectrum) were sold.
