= The Gauntlet (module) =

Dungeons & Dragons adventure module

- Cover to The Gauntlet
- Code: UK3
- TSR product code: 9111
- Rules required: Advanced Dungeons & Dragons 1st edition
- Character levels: 3 - 6
- Campaign setting: Greyhawk
- Authors: Graeme Morris
- First published: 1984

Linked modules
- UK1, UK2, UK3, UK4, UK5, UK6, UK7

The Gauntlet is an adventure module for the Dungeons & Dragons fantasy role-playing game, set in the World of Greyhawk campaign setting.

== Plot summary ==
The Gauntlet is an adventure in which the player characters are instructed by a magical glove to seek its evil mate, which is worn by an ogrillon residing in the Keep of Adlerweg.

== Publication history ==
UK3 The Gauntlet is a 32-page book with an outer folder that was written by Graeme Morris and published by TSR, Inc. in 1984 for the first edition Advanced Dungeons & Dragons rules. The adventure is the second of two modules in the "Adlerweg" series, the sequel to UK2 The Sentinel.

== Reception ==
Chris Hunter reviewed The Gauntlet together with UK2 in Imagine magazine, giving it a positive review. Calling UK3 "even better than its predecessor", Hunter noted that the module contains "extremely well detailed" information on the defenses of Adlerweg Keep. His only concern was over an encounter featuring over "180 assorted creatures" that could create difficulties for the DM as the party is split into two or even three groups simultaneously. However, he felt the guidelines and battle plan for this encounter are excellent. Hunter also thought the final confrontation "can prove deadly", pointing out that in his test three out of seven characters died. Although he would not recommend the module for novice DMs, Hunter concluded the review by saying: "UK2 is good, UK3 is very good and together [...] they are excellent."

Receiving 7 out of 10 overall, the module received a fairly positive review from Graham Staplehurst in issue 60 of White Dwarf magazine. Staplehurst criticised the module's cover art as "feeble", but felt that The Sentinel and The Gauntlet are "well thought out enough and certainly provide several sessions' worth of intriguing play for experienced and novice players. Staplehurst felt "The Gauntlet" was more "restricted in scope" than the first part of the series, and disliked its linear and directed play, commenting that he "found the amount of channelling and character manipulation off-putting and at times frustrating". He found that some encounters were deadlier than those in The Sentinel and not avoidable by good gameplay, leading to too much hack-and-slay adventure in the early stages. Staplehurst felt that all professionally produced adventure scenarios had an excessive amount of magic and treasure, and this one was no exception, but concluded that "the adventure was neatly planned and a tribute to the 'logical' scenario.

Lawrence Schick, in his 1991 book Heroic Worlds, said of the characters being led to the ogrillon: "That's what happens when you let garments tell you what to do."

== Reviews ==
- Envoyer #21
