= Beyond the Crystal Cave =

Dungeons & Dragons adventure module

- Cover to Beyond the Crystal Cave
- Code: UK1
- TSR product code: 9066
- Rules required: Advanced Dungeons & Dragons 1st edition
- Character levels: 4 – 7
- Campaign setting: Greyhawk
- Authors: Brown, Kirby and Morris
- First published: 1983

Linked modules
- UK1, UK2, UK3, UK4, UK5, UK6, UK7

Beyond the Crystal Cave is a Dungeons & Dragons adventure module set in the World of Greyhawk campaign setting. It is unusual among D&D modules in that it encourages a non-violent approach (mainly parleying and true role-playing tactics) to achieving goals. It is set in an old English milieu on Sybarate Isle in the Hold of the Sea Princes.

== Plot summary ==
Beyond the Crystal Cave is an adventure in which the player characters are hired to save a recently eloped couple from the Cave of Echoes after they fled there. The heroes must resolve the secret of the Crystal Cave to enter Porpherio's Garden, a magical place located on the island of Sybarate, where it is summer all year long. Experience points are gained by resolving encounters intelligently without unneeded violence.

== Publication history ==
Beyond the Crystal Cave was written by British designers Dave J. Browne, Tom Kirby, and Graeme Morris, and published by TSR in 1983 as a 32-page booklet with an outer folder.

In 2005, Kenzer & Company published a HackMaster module based on the adventure named Porpher's Enchanted Garden. It was originally solicited as Yonder Crystal Caverns, but was changed due to substantial lateness in gaining authorisation from Wizards of the Coast (who acquired TSR and D&D in 1997). The new version required less talking and more action, making it more typical of the game system. The module was hacked by James Butler, a freelance writer from the United Kingdom.

In 2011, Wizards of the Coast updated the module for the 4th Edition and added combat situations for their Encounters line of pre-made adventures.

A remastered version of the adventure was published in the anthology Quests from the Infinite Staircase for Dungeons & Dragons (5th edition) on July 16, 2024.

== Reception ==
Doug Cowie reviewed Beyond the Crystal Cave favorably for Imagine magazine. He liked the clear layout, lucid descriptions and good maps and found it a module that tries to emphasize diplomacy and intelligence over force and is "more successful than most in achieving this aim". Cowie thought that it is possible to go through the adventure "without drawing a sword" and that the main setting, Porpherio's Garden, is "highly original and well thought out". His only criticism was that some of the denizens of the garden are too prone to random attack, but he felt that was a minor point, easily altered by the Dungeon Master (DM). Overall, according to Cowie, UK1 is a "refreshing change" which "gives the talkative sort of character a place in the limelight all too often filled by the brutish fighter or the powerful MU". He concluded the review by calling it "a good package" and suggested readers should "try it for a relaxing change".

Thomas M. Brooks reviewed Beyond the Crystal Cave for Fantasy Gamer magazine and stated that "Overall, the module is a breath of fresh air to those trapped in hack-and-grab dungeons. In addition, there is a wealth of ideas for the dungeon master who wants to design more than the normal dungeon. I recommend it to any experienced players."

Receiving 9 out of 10 overall, the module was positively reviewed in issue No. 48 of White Dwarf magazine. The reviewer, Jim Bambra, noted that Beyond the Crystal Cave was "an interesting and thought-provoking adventure" more appropriate for characters level 3–6. He mentioned that players would be "treated to a lot of interesting encounters and puzzles" after reaching Porpherio's Garden, and felt that the authors have sought to reward thoughtful solutions to dilemmas rather than hack-and-slash ones. Bambra also noted how the authors set out to discourage players from attacking everything they encounter, concluding that this module "makes a refreshing change from the more normal combat orientated adventure for its emphasis is very much on role-playing and problem solving".

Lawrence Schick, in his 1991 book Heroic Worlds, felt that the UK series of modules "are typically heavier on atmosphere than their American-designed counterparts, though they do like to use those ridiculous monsters from the Fiend Folio."
