= The Final Enemy =

Dungeons & Dragons adventure module

- Code: U3
- TSR product code: 9076
- Rules required: AD&D
- Character levels: 3 - 5
- Campaign setting: Greyhawk
- Authors: Dave J. Browne with Don Turnbull
- First published: 1983

Linked modules
- U1 U2 U3

The Final Enemy is an adventure module for the Advanced Dungeons & Dragons (AD&D) fantasy roleplaying game written by Dave Browne with Don Turnbull set in the World of Greyhawk campaign setting.

== Plot summary ==
The Final Enemy is an underwater adventure in which the player characters attack the lair of a species of fish-like monstrous humanoids called sahuagin. After identifying the evil creatures, which have massed in force and organized as a threat to the village of Saltmarsh, the player characters have the opportunity to thwart the creatures' plans and ensure the safety of the little town.

== Publication history ==
The Final Enemy was written by Dave J. Browne with Don Turnbull, with art by Keith Parkinson, and was published by TSR in 1983 as a 48-page booklet with an outer folder. It was designed and developed in the United Kingdom, and was intended for characters of 3rd–5th level. The module was the third and final module in the Saltmarsh series, presenting the climactic events in an underwater campaign of three related adventures set in the town of Saltmarsh which began in The Sinister Secret of Saltmarsh and continued in Danger at Dunwater.
