= The Sentinel (module) =

Dungeons & Dragons adventure module

- Cover to The Sentinel
- Code: UK2
- TSR product code: 9101
- Rules required: Advanced Dungeons & Dragons 1st edition
- Character levels: 2 - 5
- Campaign setting: Greyhawk
- Authors: Graeme Morris
- First published: 1983

Linked modules
- UK1, UK2, UK3, UK4, UK5, UK6, UK7

The Sentinel is an adventure module for the Dungeons & Dragons fantasy role-playing game, set in World of Greyhawk campaign setting.

== Plot summary ==
The Sentinel is an adventure in which the player characters stop a skulk from terrorizing a village, and then seek a magical gauntlet. The characters try to find out what happened to Kusnir and why.

== Publication history ==
UK2 The Sentinel is a 32-page book with an outer folder published by TSR, Inc. in 1983 for the first edition of Advanced Dungeons & Dragons rules. The adventure was written by Graeme Morris, and is the first of two modules in the "Adlerweg" adventure series; it was followed by UK3 The Gauntlet.

== Reception ==
Chris Hunter reviewed The Sentinel together with UK3 in Imagine magazine, giving it a positive review. Hunter initially did not like the section called "Outline of the Adventure", which seemed to dictate the sequence of the players' actions, but he later realized that things "follow a fairly natural order". His only criticism was that the level requirements for the second module in the series are too high for it to be a direct follow-up, i.e. according to Hunter, there is "too big a jump between" the two. However, Hunter concluded: "UK2 is good, UK3 is very good and together [...] they are excellent."

Receiving 8 out of 10 overall, the module received a fairly positive review from Graham Staplehurst in issue 60 of White Dwarf magazine. Staplehurst criticised the module's cover art as "feeble", but felt that The Sentinel and The Gauntlet are "well thought out enough and certainly provide several sessions' worth of intriguing play for experienced and novice players alike." Morris felt that The Sentinel was "very well presented, with excellently laid-out maps, information sheets for players to be given at various stages and a rosters of all the monsters for the DM."

== Reviews ==
- Envoyer #21
