= All That Glitters... (module) =

Dungeons & Dragons adventure module

- Cover to All That Glitters... (art by Brian Williams)
- Code: UK6
- TSR product code: 9126
- Rules required: Advanced Dungeons & Dragons 1st edition
- Character levels: 3 - 5
- Campaign setting: Greyhawk
- Authors: Jim Bambra
- First published: 1984

Linked modules
- UK1, UK2, UK3, UK4, UK5, UK6, UK7

All That Glitters... is an adventure module published in 1984 by TSR for the first edition of the Advanced Dungeons & Dragons fantasy roleplaying game. It is set in the World of Greyhawk campaign setting and is intended for 5-8 player characters of levels 5-7.

== Plot summary ==
All That Glitters... is a scenario in which the player characters follow a treasure map through a jungle and wilderness inhabited by fierce tribesmen. The module also describes the "Wind Walkers' Passages", which are tunnels through a mountain range called the Hadarna Mountains.

The player characters acquire pieces of a map showing a journey through forest, mountains and desert leading to a temple and treasure.

== Publication history ==
UK6 All That Glitters was written by Jim Bambra, with interior art by Tim Sell and cover art by Brian Williams, and was published by TSR in 1984 as a 32-page booklet with an outer folder. This module is part of the UK series of modules and was written and developed by TSR UK division, but was printed in the US. Graeme Morris and Tom Kirby contributed to the storyline, Phil Gallagher was in charge of production. Cartography was by Paul Ruiz.

== Reception ==
Chris Hunter reviewed the module for Imagine magazine, giving it a favorable review. Hunter noted that, compared to UK5, this module is a more conventional "follow-the-treasure-map-adventure". Although he thought this a "hackneyed idea", Hunter considered it well executed. He described the main part of the module as "well thought out". Overall he called this "a worthwhile and interesting excursion".
