= Dark Clouds Gather =

Dungeons & Dragons adventure module

- Cover art by Brian Williams
- Code: UK7
- TSR product code: 9151
- Rules required: Advanced Dungeons & Dragons 1st edition
- Character levels: 7-9
- Authors: Jim Bambra; Phil Gallagher; Graeme Morris
- First published: 1985

Linked modules
- UK1, UK2, UK3, UK4, UK5, UK6, UK7

Dark Clouds Gather is an adventure module published in 1985 for the Advanced Dungeons & Dragons fantasy role-playing game.

== Plot summary ==
Dark Clouds Gather is an adventure which involves combat between good and evil creatures in the air, and an attack on the flying home of a cloud giant. The adventure is divided into four parts of increasing difficulty to clean the reputation of the Aarakocra bird-people, who have been accused of crimes against local humans. The players will free an Aarakocra agent, explore the crystal citadel of the archmage Devral, and fight the leader of some snow-demons.

== Publication history ==
In the late 1970s, TSR opened an office in the United Kingdom, and some material was published that had been developed by the UK office. This included a line of AD&D modules starting with UK 1 Beyond the Crystal Cave in 1983. The seventh and final module in this line was UK7 Dark Clouds Gather, written by Jim Bambra and Phil Gallagher with storyline contributions by Graeme Morris, and featuring art by Brian Williams. It was published by TSR in 1985 as a 32-page booklet with an outer folder.

== Reception ==
In Issue 37 of Abyss, Dave Nalle found the adventure predictable, noting, "Dark Clouds Gather follows standard patterns quite closely. Surprises are kept to a minimum, there are only two new monsters and the setting is depressingly familiar. However, Nalle did find "aspects which are more sophisticated than one might expect, and there are situations to be solved and some mental challenges for the players." Nalle concluded, "This is a formulaic adventure and there is far too much combat, but this is a good adventure for the type of adventure which it is, and I think I can recommend it, especially for AD&D; players who like combat and tactics and aren't ready to try another system or campaign with stronger role-playing content."

Lawrence Schick, in his 1991 book Heroic Worlds, warned that this scenario required experienced gamemasters and "players with a good grasp of the rules".

== Other reviews and commentary ==
- The V.I.P. of Gaming Magazine #2 (1986)
