= Eye of the Serpent =

Dungeons & Dragons adventure module

- Cover to Eye of the Serpent (art by Tim Sell)
- Code: UK5
- TSR product code: 9125
- Rules required: Advanced Dungeons & Dragons 1st edition
- Character levels: 1
- Campaign setting: None
- Authors: Graeme Morris
- First published: 1984

Linked modules
- UK1, UK2, UK3, UK4, UK5, UK6, UK7

Eye of the Serpent is an adventure module published in 1984 by TSR for the first edition of the Advanced Dungeons & Dragons fantasy roleplaying game. It is a first level scenario for one player and one gamemaster, but can also be used with a group of players. The single player can choose to be a ranger, druid or monk.

== Plot summary ==
Eye of the Serpent is an adventure in which the player characters are brought by a roc to its nest in the mountain, and to escape they must climb down the mountain and traverse a hazardous valley to get home. If the scenario is played as a one-on-one scenario, the player character is accompanied by three non-player characters.

== Publication history ==
UK5 Eye of the Serpent was written by Graeme Morris, with art by Tim Sell and was published by TSR in 1984 as a 32-page booklet with an outer folder.

It is part of the UK-series of modules, written by British authors and developed by TSR's UK division.

== Reception ==
Chris Hunter reviewed the module for Imagine magazine, giving it a mixed review. Hunter described the scenario as climbing down a "rather artificial looking" mountain side. This constitutes the main part of the adventure and involves various encounters reached via routes, access to which depends on the type of player character chosen. While this approach tests the special abilities of the selected type of character, it has the "unfortunate side effect" that there is virtually only one way to go, i.e. there is very little choice of direction for the player(s). Hunter also noted an "excessive use" of monsters from the Monster Manual II. He concluded that the module was based on a novel idea and that it had "a lot of work" put into it, but that it ultimately "doesn't quite come off".
