= Danger at Dunwater =

Dungeons & Dragons adventure module

- The cover of the module with art by Dave de Leuw showing a locathah on a giant eel.
- Code: U2
- TSR product code: 9064
- Rules required: Advanced Dungeons & Dragons 1st edition
- Character levels: 1–4
- Campaign setting: Greyhawk
- Authors: Dave J. Browne with Don Turnbull
- First published: 1982

Linked modules
- U1 U2 U3

Danger at Dunwater is an adventure module for the Advanced Dungeons & Dragons (AD&D) fantasy roleplaying game, written by Dave J. Browne with Don Turnbull The module was first published by TSR, Inc. in 1982 and contains a 32-page adventure set in the World of Greyhawk campaign setting. It was designed for 6-10 characters of level 1-4.

== Plot summary ==
Danger at Dunwater is an adventure in which the player characters will need to track down a growing army of lizardmen to their lair, to stop their planned assault on the town of Saltmarsh.

Saltmarsh is a small fishing village facing serious problems. Lizard Men are gathering a force nearby and buying many sophisticated weapons. A party of adventurers is hired by the town council to investigate the Lizard Men so the villagers can live in peace.

== Publication history ==
Danger at Dunwater was written by Dave J. Browne with Don Turnbull, and art drawn by Tim Truman; it was published in 1982 as a 32-page booklet with an outer folder. Designed and developed in the United Kingdom, it was intended for 6–10 characters of level 1–4. The module has been described as a low-level scenario that carries on where The Sinister Secret of Saltmarsh leaves off. It is the second module in the "Saltmarsh" series.

The second of three related adventures in an underwater campaign set in the town of Saltmarsh, the module is a sequel to U1 – The Sinister Secret of Saltmarsh and is followed by U3 – The Final Enemy, which concludes the series.

== Reception ==
Doug Cowie gave Danger at Dunwater a positive review in Imagine magazine, noting that "modules are currently being turned out to a very high standard and this one is no exception". He felt that the module provides clear and well organized details as well as "well rounded" NPCs but that it should be run by an experienced DM who can do justice to its subtleties. Cowie's only reservation was that the town of Saltmarsh plays a central role in all of the modules of the U1-3 series, but that DMs are expected to create it themselves with the help of "minimal outline material". Cowie felt that this is the sort of detail one expects to find in a module. Nevertheless, he found this to offer a "rewarding set" of adventures which are best played as part of the series. In conclusion, Cowie praised the careful design and "fresh approach" and urged his readers to "play it".

Jim Bambra reviewed Danger at Dunwater for White Dwarf, and gave it 8/10 overall, commenting that the module was evidence that a low level adventure can be still be interesting and challenging. Bambra felt that this adventure was meant for players who enjoy a mental challenge; "Players who attack everything they meet will find the adventure entertaining but will not realise its full potential. Those who do not overlook obvious clues will realise that there is something more afoot here than immediately meets the eye." Bambra concluded by praising the module further feeling that "A lot of thought has gone into this module, monsters are not there to be slain, they have personalities and feelings which come across very well."

Christopher R. Celtruda reviewed Danger at Dunwater for Fantasy Gamer magazine and stated that "However, there are a few minor faults. The first is the extreme difficulty involved in effectively keeping track of the changing political structure and leadership during the course of play, The second, and more frustrating, problem is the inability of players to pick up on the provided clues. Final analysis: Despite its problems, it is well worth the price. Pick this one up."

Ken Denmead of Wired's GeekDad listed the module as one of the "Top 10 D&D Modules I Found in Storage This Weekend". According to Denmead, this is "another module where the challenge is not what it seems, which is always fun. A little understanding and compassion can go a long way towards avoiding deadly combat."
