= When a Star Falls =

Dungeons & Dragons adventure module

- Cover to When A Star Falls
- Code: UK4
- TSR product code: 9120
- Rules required: Advanced Dungeons & Dragons 1st edition
- Character levels: 3 - 5
- Campaign setting: None
- Authors: Graeme Morris
- First published: 1984

Linked modules
- UK1, UK2, UK3, UK4, UK5, UK6, UK7

When a Star Falls is an adventure module for the first edition of the Dungeons & Dragons fantasy role-playing game published by TSR, Inc. in 1984. It was written by Graeme Morris and is intended for 6–10 player characters between levels 3–5.

== Plot summary ==
When a Star Falls is an adventure in which the player characters search for a fallen star, meeting challenges along the way which requires the PCs to deal with greedy derro, deceptive Sverfneblin and treacherous clerics.

The characters need to give the fallen star to its rightful owner, and the star's secrets are revealed as they journey. The PCs have an encounter with a monster called a memory web on the moors south-east of the Tegefed mountains, and learn of a falling star that reached the earth. They are encouraged to find it and bring it to Shalfey, an Elder Sage of the Tower of the Heavens.

== Publication history ==
UK4: When a Star Falls was written by Graeme Morris, and published by TSR in 1984 as a 32-page booklet with two outer folders. This module, like all those of the U and UK series, was developed by the TSR UK division.

A remastered version of the adventure was published in the anthology Quests from the Infinite Staircase for Dungeons & Dragons 5th edition on July 16, 2024.

== Reception ==
Rick Swan reviewed the adventure in The Space Gamer #73. Swan felt the entire UK series of modules had been high quality, and that this one was no exception. He suggested that the little "UK" symbol in the corner of certain TSR modules must be their secret code for quality. Swan felt the story of When a Star Falls is "rich enough to stand on its own," adding that designer Graeme Morris "goes out of his way to avoid the usual clichés ... the complex plot is easy to follow thanks to his crisp writing." Swan concluded that the adventure would hold the attention of even the most restless group of players, and that the adventure was "definitely worth checking out."

Chris Hunter reviewed the scenario for Imagine magazine. He started by pointing out his possible conflict of interest, given that the module was developed by his colleagues at TSR UK (which also published Imagine magazine). Hunter felt that the module was very good, providing a sound and interesting storyline and a suspenseful plot. Moreover, according to him, the module provides the dungeon master with all the information needed and it is presented in a clear and concise way, with errors minor or nonexistent. Looking hard for something to criticize, Hunter noted an "excessive use" of non-standard monsters (i.e. those from the Fiend Folio and Monster Manual II). He concluded the review by saying that "It may no longer be true for many products but as far as the UK series of AD&D modules goes, British is best!"
