= Dave J. Browne =

British game designer

- Occupation: Game designer

Dave J. Browne is a game designer who has worked primarily on role-playing games.

== Career ==
Dave Browne and Don Turnbull wrote the TSR UK adventures U1-U3 (1981–1983), which added to the Greyhawk setting. He also wrote the adventure Beyond the Crystal Cave (1983) with Tom Kirby and Graeme Morris.
