= Games Day =

British gaming convention

Owl and Weasel #11: Programme for the first Games Workshop Games Day in 1975.

Games Day was a yearly gaming convention sponsored by Games Workshop. It was started in 1975, after another games convention scheduled for August that year cancelled. Games Workshop decided to fill the resulting gap by running a gaming day of their own. As a result, after some delays, the first Games Day was held at Seymour Hall, London on 20 December 1975. The convention was important because there were few outlets for gamers to meet each other and play, and Games Workshop used this in their efforts to build the gaming scene in the U.K.

Following this successful start, and encouraged by mainstream media coverage, the second Games Day was held at a different venue, Chelsea Town Hall, London, on 12 February 1977. The event was somewhat delayed, owing to the logistics of running a rapidly expanding business. It followed rapidly by a separate "D&D Day" at Fulham Town Hall on 12 March, this being their core funding stream at that time.

The Games Day convention was regularly held in the United Kingdom at the National Exhibition Centre, Birmingham. It drew enthusiasts of Games Workshop's three main games (Warhammer 40,000, Warhammer, Lord of the Rings). It was not just a commercial venture, gamers go to play their games and attend presentations by special guests from the Games Workshop's head office in Nottingham.

Alongside the gaming was a dealer's area which commonly included products from Citadel Miniatures, particularly, armies for all the game systems scheduled for release. Another attraction was the Golden Demon, a painting competition of miniatures. There was also a competition of varying degrees of seriousness, the Scrap Demon competition, in which competitors create a models from plastic sprues.

It included the Golden Demon painting competition, news stands, sales stands, and tables to play on. In 2014 it was replaced by 'Warhammer Fest', similar but with additions such as demonstration pods and seminars.

== Game Day conventions outside the United Kingdom ==
Within the US, Games Days were held in Los Angeles, California; Baltimore, Maryland; Chicago, Illinois; and Atlanta, Georgia. In Canada, the venue was the Queen Elizabeth Building at Exhibition Place in Toronto, Ontario. In France, the venue was Le Stade de France, Paris.

In the Netherlands, two Games days were organised under the Name "Mega Gaming Day", the first on 21 November 1998 in Amersfoort at De Flint theatre and the 2nd on 13 November 1999 in Utrecht at de Jaarbeurs.

== Timeline (partial) ==
Event	Date	Location	Approximate Attendance	Notes
Games Day I	20 December 1975	Seymour Hall, Westminster, London	Reported as "Britain's largest gaming convention" in The Times, but as "several hundred" in Owl and Weasel #12, compared with "circa 900" for South London Warlords annual wargaming convention in 1975 (same issue).	
Games Day II	12 February 1977	Chelsea Town Hall, London		
"D&D Day"	12 March 1977	Fulham Town Hall, London	"est. 200"	Separate event following Games Day II, but advertised within that programme.
Games Day III	17 December 1977	Seymour Hall, Westminster, London	"1,000+"	
Games Day IV	28 October 1978	Seymour Hall, Westminster, London	"over 2,000" to "circa 2,500"	Stated in WD that would have ranked #2 (behind Origins) if had been held in the US.
Games Day '87	9 - 11 November 1987	New Hall, Westminster, London		
Games Day 2000 (United States)	30 June - 1 July 2000	Baltimore Convention Center, Baltimore, Maryland		
Games Day 2000 (Australia)	October 2000	Darling Harbour Convention Centre, Sydney, NSW, Australia	"over 1,500"	
Games Day 2001 (Canada)	26 August 2001	International Centre, Mississauga, Ontario		The first ever Games Day held in Canada. Featured the Hunt for Russ mega-game event.
Games Day 2001 (Australia)	21 October 2001	Hordern Pavilion, Moore Park, NSW, Australia		
Games Day 2002 (Canada)	17 August 2002	International Centre, Mississauga, Ontario, Canada		
Games Day 2003 (Australia)	26 October 2003	Australia	"over 2000"	
Games Day 2005 (Germany)	28 August 2005	Gürzenich, Cologne, North Rhine-Westphalia	"Several thousand"	Unreleased miniatures were shown off to guests.
Games Day 2005	25 September 2005	National Exhibition Centre, Birmingham	9,000	The first Games Day to take place at the National Exhibition Centre. Staff from the design studio fielded questions at this event. Games Day 2005 attendees were given Index Astartes: Steel Confessors.
Games Day 2006	24 September 2006	National Exhibition Centre, Birmingham		
Games Day 2008	14 September 2008	National Exhibition Centre, Birmingham		

== Bibliography ==
- "Games Day 2000". White Dwarf (AU). No. 253. Games Workshop. January 2001. pp. 5–10.
- "Games Day 2001". White Dwarf (AU). No. 259. Games Workshop. July 2001. pp. 16–19.
