= Mark Smith =

Mark Smith may refer to:

== Academia ==
- Marc Smith (palaeographer) (born 1963), French palaeographer
- Mark Smith (physicist), British physicist and Vice-Chancellor of Lancaster University
- Mark A. Smith (1965–2010), professor of pathology at Case Western Reserve University
- Mark M. Smith (active since 1997), American historian
- Mark S. Smith (born 1956), American biblical scholar, professor at NYU

== Arts and entertainment ==
=== Drama, television, and film ===
- Mark Smith (actor, born 1887) (1887–1944), American actor
- Mark Smith (actor, born 1969) (born 1969), English bodybuilder and participant on the UK television show Gladiators
- Mark Smith (sound engineer) (active since 1987), American sound engineer who won an Academy Award
- Mark Coles Smith (born 1987), Australian actor
- Mark L. Smith (born 1996), American director and screenwriter
- Mark Landon Smith (born 1964), American playwright and actor

=== Literature ===
- Mark Smith (author), British author of fantasy game books
- Mark Smith (journalist), American journalist
- Mark Smith (novelist) (1935–2022), American best-selling author
- Mark Andrew Smith (born 1979), American comic book author
- Mark Haskell Smith (born 1957), American writer

=== Music ===
- Mark Smith, member of post-rock band Explosions in the Sky (active since 1999)
- Mark Smith (musician) (1960–2009), British bassist and record producer
- Mark E. Smith (1957–2018), British singer and founder of The Fall
- Mark Edgley Smith (1955–2008), British composer

=== Visual arts ===
- Mark T. Smith (born 1968), American painter

== Politics ==
- Mark Smith (Iowa politician) (born 1952), American state representative
- Mark Smith (South Carolina politician), American state representative-elect
- Mark Smith (Canadian politician) (born 1960), Canadian politician for the Legislative Assembly of Alberta
- Mark W. Smith (born 1968), American author, attorney, and political analyst
- Marcus A. Smith (1851–1924), known as Mark, U.S. Senator from Arizona

== Science and engineering ==
- Mark L. Smith (physician) (active since 1999), American physician and plastic surgeon
- Mark Smith (R/C modeling pioneer) (born 1950), designer of radio-controlled model airplanes

== Sports ==
- Mark Smith (American football) (1974–2026), American football player
- Mark Smith (American racing driver) (born 1967), American CART competitor
- Mark Smith (sprinter) (born 1971), English athlete
- Mark Smith (basketball) (born 1999), American basketball player
- Mark Smith (British racing driver) (born 1965), English BTCC competitor
- Mark Smith (cricketer) (born 1975), Zimbabwean cricketer
- Mark Smith (fencer) (born 1956), American Olympic fencer
- Mark Smith (footballer, born 1960), English football player (Sheffield Wednesday)
- Mark Smith (footballer, born October 1961), English football player (West Ham United)
- Mark Smith (footballer, born December 1961), English football player and manager
- Mark Smith (footballer, born 1964), Scottish football player (Stoke City)
- Mark Smith (footballer, born 1973), English football player (Crewe Alexandra)
- Mark Smith (ice hockey) (born 1977), Canadian professional ice hockey player
- Mark Smith (outfielder) (born 1970), American former professional baseball player
- Mark Smith (Pennsylvanian racing driver) (born 1971), racing driver from Pennsylvania
- Mark Smith (pitcher) (born 1955), American former professional baseball player
- Mark Smith (racing engineer) (born 1961), Formula One designer
- Mark Smith (rugby league) (born 1981), English former rugby league player
- Bison Smith (Mark Smith, 1973–2011), American professional wrestler
- Mark Smith (high jumper), winner of the 1953 NCAA DI outdoor high jump championship

== Other ==
- Mark C. Smith (1940–2007), founder and chief executive officer of ADTRAN
- Mark E. Smith (Civil Air Patrol), National Commander of the Civil Air Patrol
- Mark Alan Smith (born 1949), American serial killer
- Mark Smith, creator of the train travel website The Man in Seat Sixty-One

== See also ==
- Marc Smith (disambiguation)
- Marcus Smith (disambiguation)
- Mark Durden-Smith (born 1968), British television presenter
