= Jamie Thomson (author) =

Author and game developer

- Born: 14 November 1958 (age 67)
- Writing career
- Genres: Video games, science fiction, fantasy
- Website: fabledlands.blogspot.com

Jamie Thomson (born 14 November 1958) is a British writer, editor and game developer, and winner of the Roald Dahl Funny Prize 2012.

== Biography ==
Thomson was born in Iran and grew up in Brighton, where he met one of his co-authors, Mark Smith, at Brighton College. He graduated from the University of Kent with a degree in politics and government.

Thomson was an assistant editor on White Dwarf magazine from 1981 to 1984 and wrote a regular column for Warlock. While working at Games Workshop, he was one of the developers of the computer game The Tower of Despair.

From 1984 to 1996 he was a prolific and best-selling author, usually publishing at least two titles per year. One of his most successful series was The Way of the Tiger, six linked adventures about a ninja hero, written with Mark Smith. The books have been published in Japan, France, USA, Italy and Sweden.

He is the author of numerous novels and 'choose-your-own-adventure' type gamebooks. His contributions to the genre include four major creator-owned series: Duel Master, Falcon, and Way of the Tiger (all co-written with Mark Smith) and Fabled Lands (co-written with Dave Morris). He also co-wrote three books for the Fighting Fantasy series: Talisman of Death and Sword of the Samurai, again with Mark Smith, and The Keep of the Lich Lord with Dave Morris. He also co-wrote an adventure game, The Tower of Despair for Games Workshop. Currently he has six novels for children published: Corvus, by Boxer Books, the Dark Lord series (Dark Lord: The Teenage Years and Dark Lord: A fiend in Need) and the Wrong Side of the Galaxy series, published by Orchard books in the UK, and by various publishers abroad from the US to Turkey with most of Europe in between. A third in the series, Dark Lord: Eternal Detention came out in 2014, along with the first in a new series of comedy adventure in space: The Wrong Side of the Galaxy. A second SF novel, A Galaxy Too Far was published in November 2015. In February, 2017, the fourth in the Dark Lord series, The Headmaster of Doom, came out.

After twelve years as an author, he moved full-time into videogame development at Eidos Interactive, publishers of Tomb Raider. In 1999 he raised over £1 million to set up his own game development company, Black Cactus, developers of the game Warrior Kings and its follow-up Warrior Kings: Battles.

After cancellation of a further sequel to Warrior Kings by the publishers, Black Cactus was wound up. Thomson raised a quarter of a million dollars in 2007 for a new start-up, Fabled Lands LLP, an intellectual property development company specialising in its own titles to be launched as iPhone comics, novels and apps.

The Dark Lord books are also available in Spain, Italy, Germany, France, the Czech Republic, Turkey, Portugal and the United States and have been optioned for TV.

Dark Lord: The Teenage Years won the prestigious children's book award, the Roald Dahl Funny Prize 2012.

In 2020, Thomson joined the team behind VulcanVerse, an MMO decentralised 3D game building a blockchain called "Elysium" and running on Polygon and Ethereum.

== Bibliography ==
=== Fighting Fantasy (Puffin Books) ===
- Talisman of Death (1984)
- Sword of the Samurai (1986)
- The Keep of the Lich Lord (1990)

=== Falcon (Sphere) ===
- The Renegade Lord (1985)
- Mechanon (1985)
- The Rack of Baal (1985)
- Lost in Time (1985)
- The Dying Sun (1986)
- At the End of Time (1986)

=== Way of the Tiger (Hodder & Stoughton) ===
- Avenger! (1985)
- Assassin! (1985)
- Usurper! (1985)
- Overlord! (1986)
- Warbringer! (1986)
- Inferno! (1987)

=== Duel Master (Armada) ===
- The Challenge of the Magi (1986)
- Blood Valley (1986)
- The Shattered Realm (1987)
- The Arena of Death (1987)

=== The Crystal Maze (Mammoth Books / Chatsworth) ===
- The Crystal Maze (1991)
- The Crystal Maze Activity Book (1992)

=== Eternal Champions (Puffin Books / Sega) ===
- The Cyber Warriors (1994)
- The Citadel of Chaos (1994)

=== Fabled Lands (Pan Macmillan) ===
- The Wartorn Kingdom (1995)
- Cities of Gold and Glory (1995)
- Over the Blood-Dark Sea (1995)
- The Plains of Howling Darkness (1995)
- The Court of Hidden Faces (1996)
- Lords of the Rising Sun (1996)

=== Puzzle Books (Icon / Wizard Books) ===
- How Big is Your Brain? (2007)

=== Corvus (Boxer) ===
- Oath of Vengeance (2010)

=== Dark Lord (Orchard Books) ===
- Dark Lord: The Teenage Years / The Early Years (2011)
- Dark Lord: A Fiend in Need / School's Out (2012)
- Dark Lord: Eternal Detention (2014)
- Dark Lord: The Headmaster of Doom (2017)

=== Galaxy Series (Orchard Books) ===
- The Wrong Side of the Galaxy
- A Galaxy Too Far

=== Vulcanverse (Fabled Lands Publishing) ===
- The Houses of the Dead (2021)
- The Wild Woods (2021)

== Other works ==
- The Tower of Despair (1984), a text-only adventure computer game for the ZX Spectrum and Commodore 64.
- To Hell And Back, a teletext adventure on UK Gold.
- The Heart of Harkun, a six-part fantasy adventure radio play, written with Peter Thomson, performed on BBC Radio 5 and Radio 7.
- Can You Brexit? Without Breaking Britain, a choose-your-own-adventure book where you take the part of the British prime minister (with Dave Morris, 2018)
