= Bathing Venus =

Bronze sculpture attributed to Giambologna

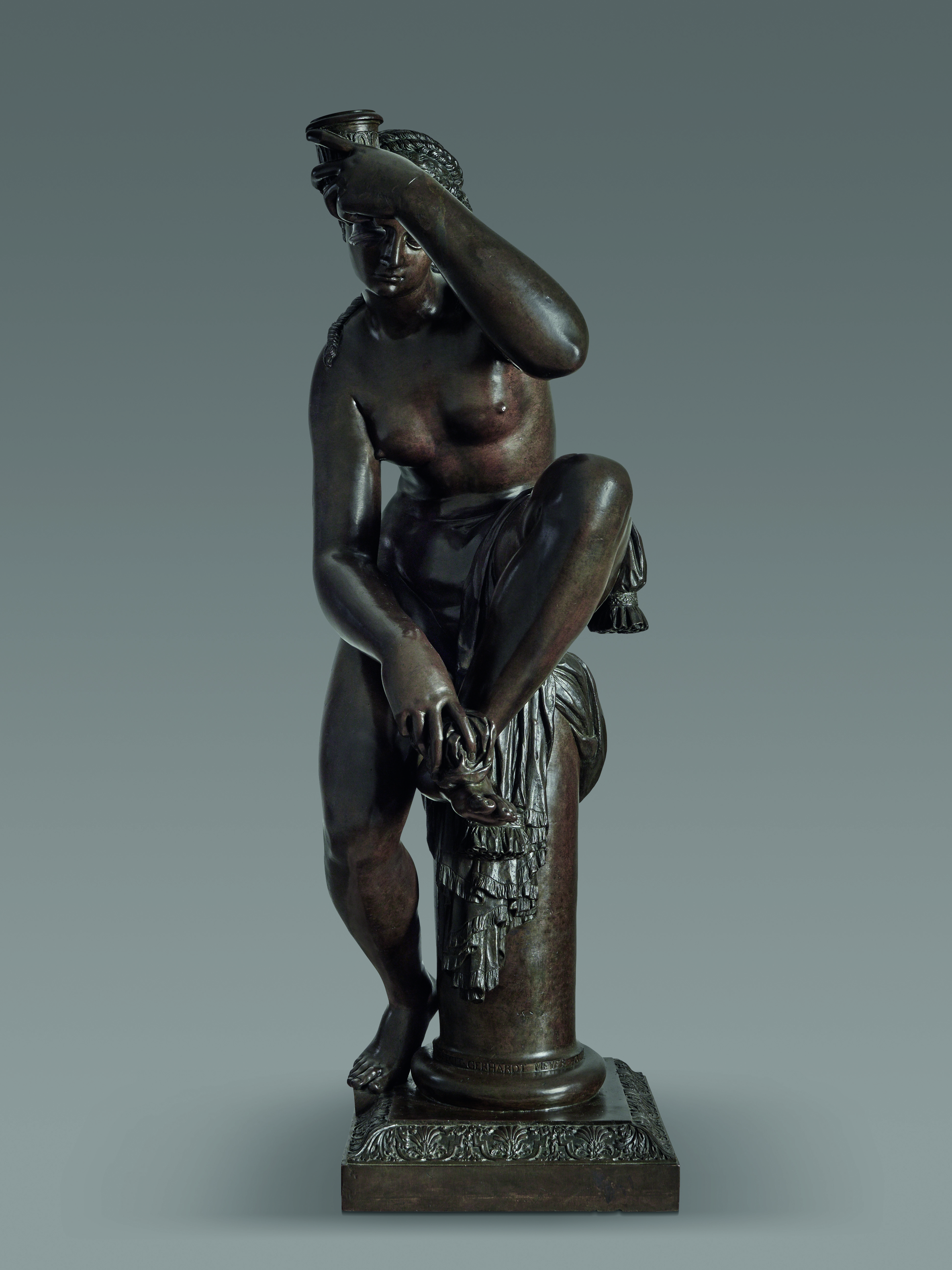
Bathing Venus (Bronze) by Giambologna (1597) Dimension: 1,12 m height Owner: Private Collection

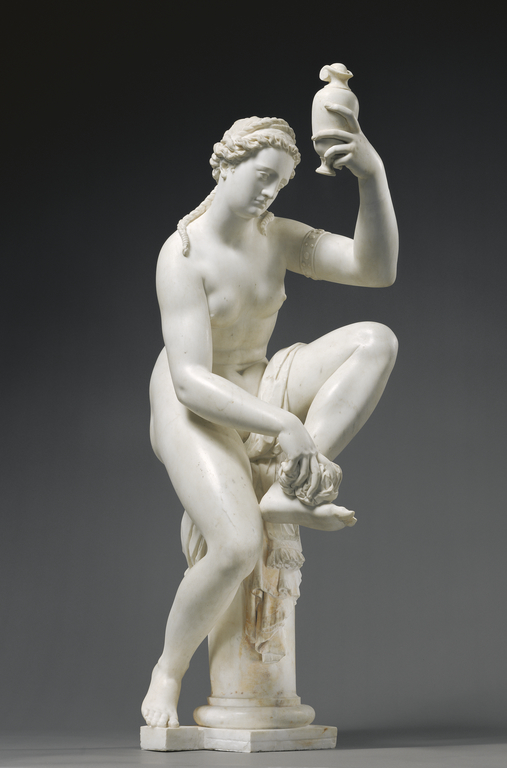
Female Figure, also known as "Venus" or "Bathseba" (Marble) by Giambologna (1571–1573) with modern replacements (e.g. vessel erroneously replaced), J. Paul Getty Museum

The Bathing Venus is a large bronze sculpture attributed to Giambologna (1529-1608), the leading late Renaissance sculptor in Europe. Archival documents suggest that it was presented to King Henry IV of France with other bronzes as a diplomatic gift from Ferdinando I de’ Medici, Grand Duke of Tuscany, to embellish the gardens of the Royal castle in Saint-Germain-en-Laye. Giambologna's Triton in the Metropolitan Museum of Art and a Mercury in the Louvre were likely to have been also part of this grand-ducal gift. The bronze Venus is a second, remodelled and rethought version of a marble Venus, the so-called Bathsheba, by the same artist, which, after its rediscovery, entered the collections of the J. Paul Getty Museum in 1982. The bronze Venus reappeared around 1960 in the possession of a scrap-metal dealer near Paris, who seemed to have obtained it from the Château de Chantemesle (sometimes spelt Chantemerle) in Corbeil-Essonnes (Île-de-France), which had been demolished in the same years. After having been first described as a Swedish late 17th century aftercast of the Getty Venus, the bronze is today internationally recognized by leading scholars as an autograph work by Giambologna. The German expert for Florentine sculpture Nicole Hegener considered the rediscovery of the bronze Bathing Venus as “the kind of sensation that occurs only once a century”.

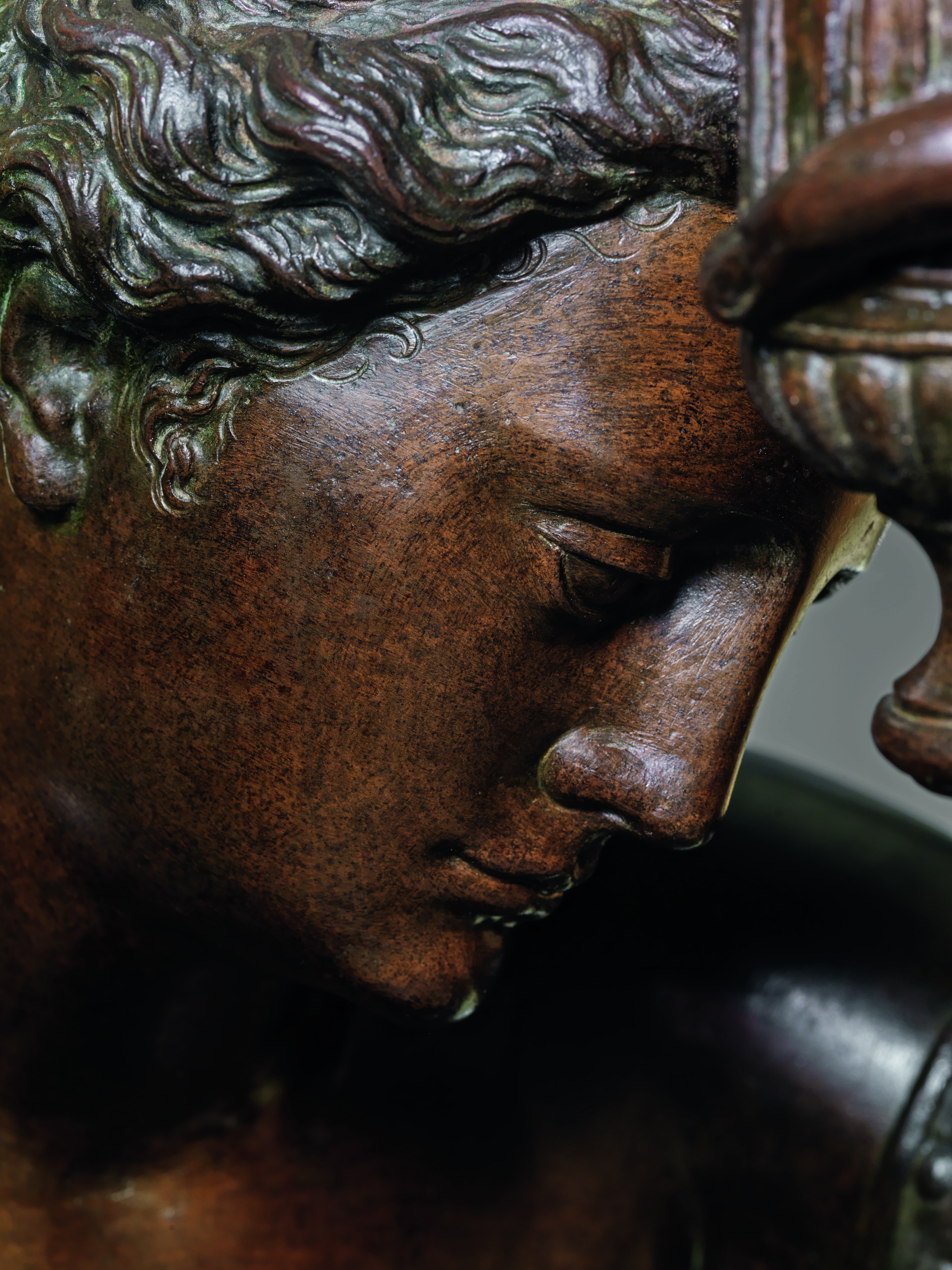
Bathing Venus (Bronze): Detail of head, hair and vessel

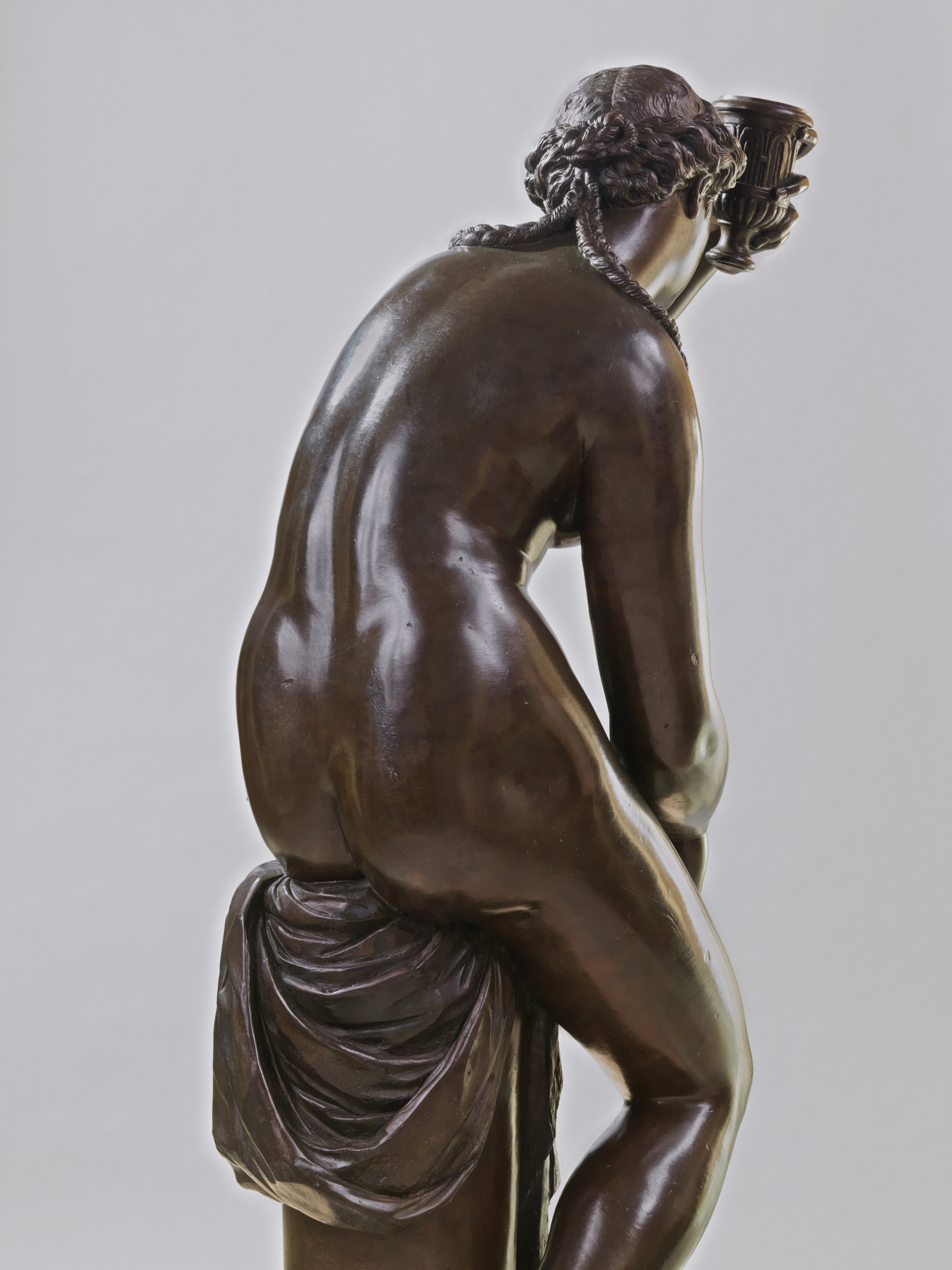
Bathing Venus (Bronze): Back view

== The subject ==
The subject of a nude, bathing female figure has been a topos of ancient art. One of the most famous examples is the Crouching Venus, a Hellenistic model of Venus surprised at her bath. The goddess Venus in Roman times embodies beauty, desire, sexuality, fertility, femininity, love and victory ("Venus Victrix"). As Venus Genetrix, the mythological ancestor to Julius Caesar, she played a central role in the political representation of the Julio-Claudian dynasty. The rebirth of the gods of antiquity in the monumental sculpture of the Renaissance took place relatively late, significantly later than in painting. In monumental sculpture, Jacopo Sansovino (1486-1570) seems to have been the first modern sculptor to bring them back to life and to make two figures of Venus, now lost. Towards the middle of the 16th century the imitation of ancient sculptures of Venus became diffused in contemporary creations. The ancient image of the goddess found its true rebirth with Giambologna, who tackled all the types of ancient representation known at the time and who made it a fundamental subject in his art. His figures of the goddess are possibly the only ones to have achieved the status of the great models from antiquity.

To enhance the erotic attraction of the female nude, the artist has contrived that the goddess hides her face behind her raised arm holding up a vessel, with which she is pouring water on her body. With the other hand she cleans herself with a handkerchief. The viewer can approach her without entering her line of sight and, when in front of her, there is a moment of reciprocal discovery. The motif of the raised left leg is an allusion to the typology of the ancient Venus removing her sandals. Not only does Giambologna borrow from ancient Venuses the game of simultaneously hiding and revealing, his bronze Bathing Venus manifests a particular delight in the indiscreet observation of the female nude matching the courtly taste of the late Renaissance.

== The two versions of the Bathing Venus ==
The German art historian Georg Satzinger writes: “[…] the bronze is a genuine new interpretation of the highest artistic quality in terms of individual dimensions (varying measurements throughout the figure) as well as in details and the introduction of a new element, namely the juxtaposition of different surfaces: some unfinished surfaces, and more worked, finished surfaces."

Following Giambologna´s documented practice both versions should derive from the same "modello in grande“ (full-scale model). Such “modelli in grande” were kept by the artist for decades in his studio.

The two versions illustrate Giambologna’s different styles in marble and bronze. Following the inspiration of Donatello and in accordance with late Mannerist aesthetics he often shows in his bronzes different textures. Therefore, the bronze Venus differentiates the surface of the skin, the hair and the cloth.

The key for the understanding of the two versions are the many differences in detail between them. Alexander Rudigier has demonstrated, following the standard method of Giovanni Morelli (1816-1891), that in every detail where the bronze diverges from the marble, this new formulation finds close analogies in other works by the artist in bronze and clay.

The discussion about the Bathing Venus being an aftercast is disproved by the evidence delivered already by Peggy Fogelman in 2002: “A comparison of measurements reveals that some dimensions of the marble original are actually smaller than those of the bronze copy, while others are larger. This inconsistent relationship between measurements of the sculptures suggests that the bronze was not cast from moulds of the marble."

== The Tuscan order of the column and the French ornament of its base ==
“The Tuscan order of the column and the ornamented frieze on its base underline subtly but appreciably the diplomatic character of the work”. “The specific form of the anthemion with the stepped band was especially common in France around 1600, which it leads Rudigier plausibly to the theory that the ornament was selected intentionally to cater for French tastes at the court of Henri IV. Its use to enhance the cyma of a Tuscan Order base may well have been perceived as particularly appropriate. It could quite possibly be that the change to the more elaborated Tuscan order was triggered by the wish to place the “French” ornament on the bronze Venus”. Archival documents show that Florentine agents at the court of Henry IV sent regular reports of the King's tastes back to the Medici court. The same ornament as on the base of the bronze can be found on the façade of the Grande Galerie of the Louvre, begun in 1595, one of the most important buildings erected for Henry IV. The Grande Galerie was built by the same architects as the Château-Neuf de Saint-Germain-en-Laye, the presumed destination of the bronze Venus.

== The Caster's Signature ==
In the early history of bronze casting the achievements of the caster were considered equal to the artist´s innovation. Following a common tradition in European bronze casting, the bronze Venus is only signed by its caster, Gerhardt Meyer: “ME FECIT GERHARDT MEYER HOLMIAE“. The small block upon which the right foot of the bronze Venus rests, bears the inscription with the day of casting: ANNO 1597 / Den 25 Novembe[r]“.

Gerhardt Meyer is likely to be identified with the “Gerdt” Gerhardt Meyer documented in Stockholm from 1592 to 1595, who was probably the same Gerhardt Meyer who in 1596 cast the monumental Paschal candelabrum in St. Peter's Church, Riga in the workshop of his kinsman Hans Meyer. Casters were one of the most itinerant professions at the time. “And there is no reason to doubt the possibility of identifying him with the “Gherardo fiammingho” mentioned in 1598 in the documents of the Compagnia di Santa Barbara in Florence […]. Meyer was a member of a dynasty of founders, mainly active around the Baltic Sea in Riga, Stockholm, Copenhagen and Helsingör between the late 16th and the late 18th century. Several generations of the family bore the given name Gerhardt and they all signed with the traditional formula: ME FECIT GERHARDT MEYER.

Like Giambologna and one of his foremost pupils, Pietro Francavilla, Meyer struggled with the correct use of the Latin locative, “Holmiae” meaning “in Stockholm”. Giambologna and Francavilla also used the Latin locative when they wanted to state their Flemish origin (Latin: BELGĀ), seemingly indicating that the figures in question have been made ‘in Belgium’ (Latin: BELGIAE) instead of their real place of manufacture, Florence. All three were not exactly Latin scholars. As Satzinger points out: “… otherwise, when inscribing the day of casting (not punched but engraved with a chiselling tool), he [Meyer] would logistically have chosen ‘Die 25 Novemb[bris] or “XXV Novembris’, instead of the Latin and German mixed form ‘Anno 1597 / Den 25 Novembe[r]’…The ambiguity of the Latin phrase, however, becomes clearer in the German translation: ‘Mich machte Gerhardt Meyer zu Stockholm’” indicating “rather the place of his workshop or his origin”.

The Swedish art historian Lars Olof Larsson excludes a Swedish origin “(…) the bronze Venus could not have been made in Sweden...The supporting documentation and the stylistic judgments demonstrate, with all the clarity one could wish for, that nothing speaks against the acceptance of it as an autograph work by Giovanni Bologna, which was cast in Florence by a hitherto unknown but extremely talented founder from Stockholm”.

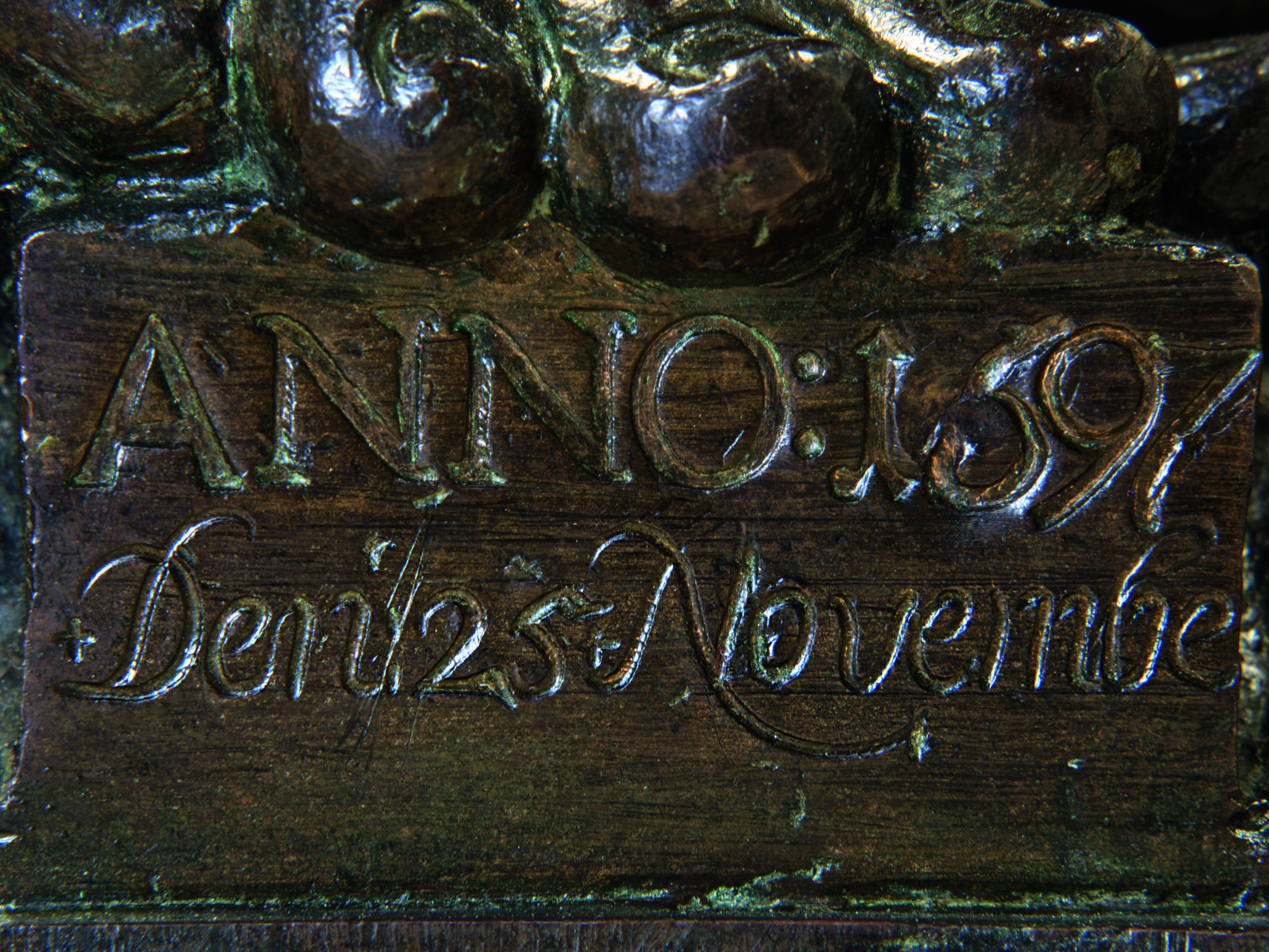
Bathing Venus (Bronze): Detail of the caster's signature

== The Date of Manufacture ==
The bronze Bathing Venus is the first large scale bronze sculpture by Giambologna to have ever been rediscovered. Its reappearance caused a lot of scientific attention, especially on the correct reading of the date of manufacture, indicated in the caster signature. The correct reading "ANNO 1597" has been confirmed by many experts in paleography, e.g. Franz-Albrecht Bornschlegel, Gino Corti, Peter Dreyer, Bertrand Jestaz and Marc Smith.

Of the indication of the year, three numbers: 1, 7, and 9, are punched whereas the 5 is engraved. The reason for this is a casting fault underneath, a so-called Lunker, which made the material so thin in this spot that punching in a letter would have created a hole. This Lunker can be seen with the naked eye and has been further proven in the year 2012 by a computer-tomography made by the Fraunhofer Institut (Fürth).

“(…) a 5 is usually produced in two or more different movements of the hand, beginning in the post Gothic period with a more or less vertical line followed by an angularly attached fragment of a circle toward the right that ends at the left without closing a circle as in the 6; a last movement can add a usually more or less horizontal line towards the right on top of the first vertical one”. The 5 in the inscription is made like a handwritten 5.

The palaeographical result corresponds to the technical TL-dating of the core material. This evidence has shown with a probability of 99.7% that the casting of the bronze took place before 1648. Tests were carried out by the Rathgen Research Laboratory of the Berlin State Museums (1996), commissioned by the J. Paul Getty Museum, confirmed by Oxford Authentication, Wantage (2008), and re-checked by Professor Ernst Pernicka at the Curt-Engelhorn-Center for Archaeometry in Mannheim (2013).

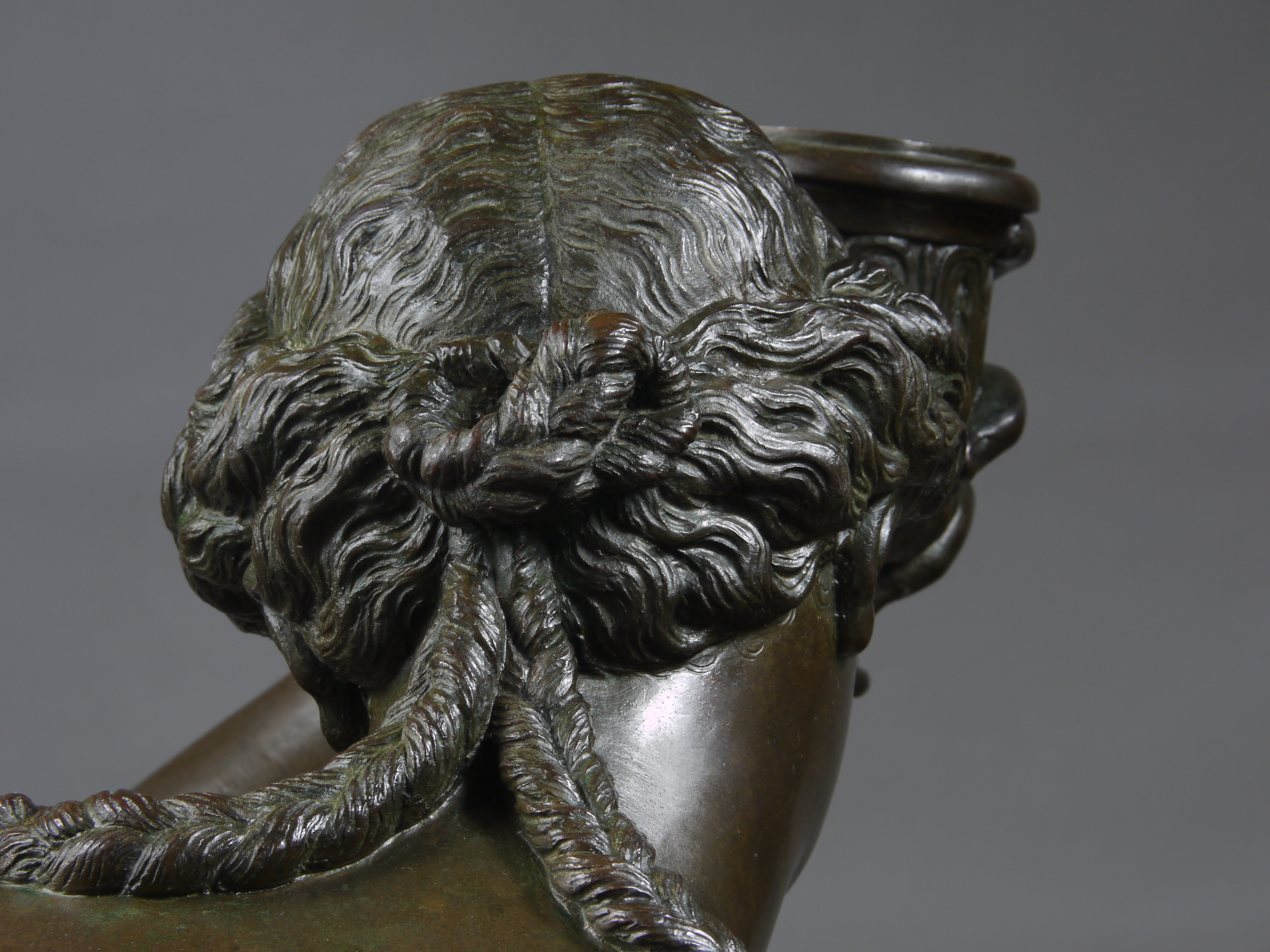
Bathing Venus (Bronze): Back view of head and hair

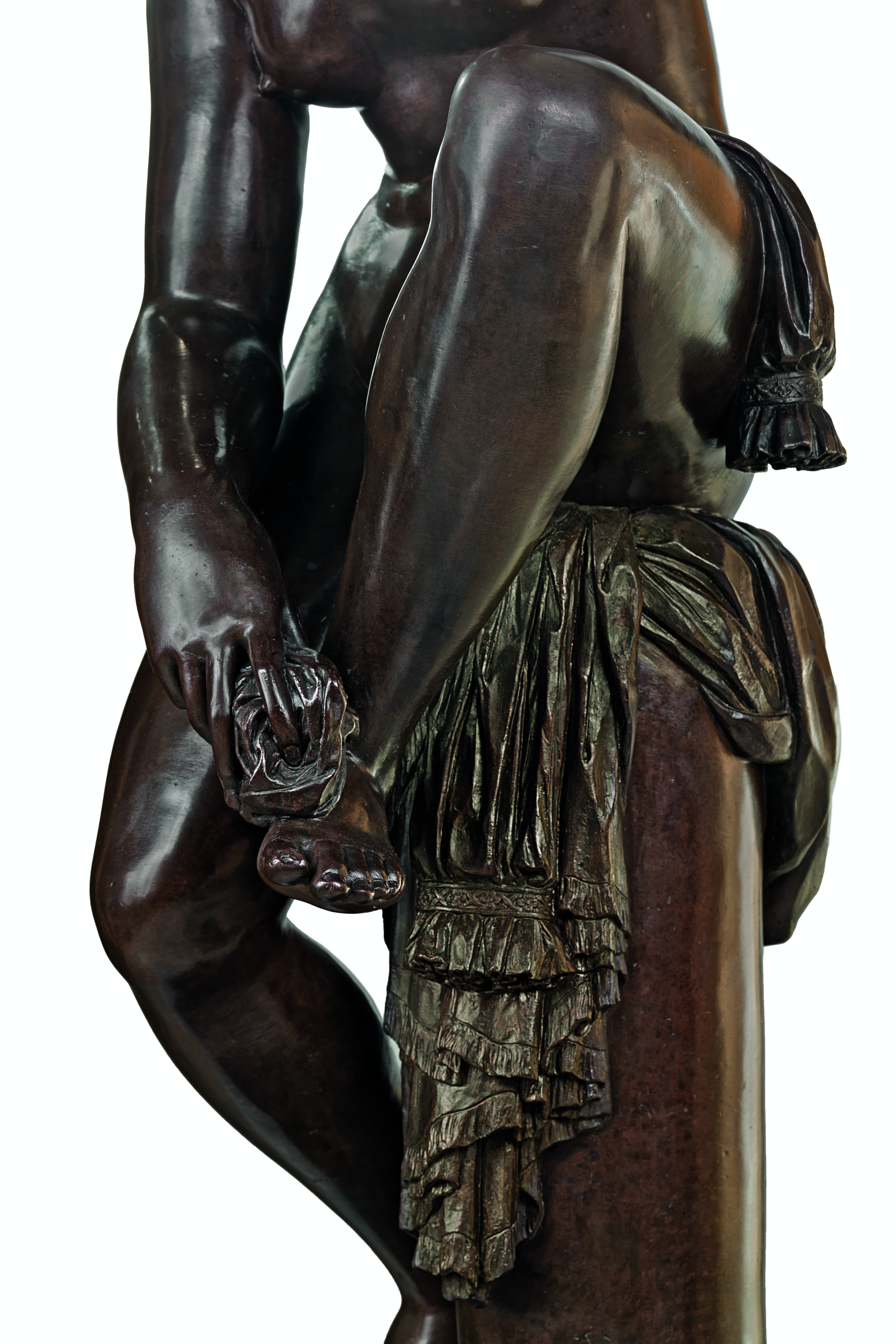
Bathing Venus (Bronze): Detail of the garment

== Research ==
In 2016 Alexander Rudigier and Blanca Truyols first published the bronze Bathing Venus in the French Bulletin monumental as a second version in bronze of the marble Venus by Giambologna, cast by Gerhardt Meyer in Florence in 1597, probably being part of the grand-ducal statuary gifts to the French king Henry IV. The attribution is based on style, technical analysis, and newly found archival documents. In his preface of this publication Bertrand Jestaz writes about: « the solid evidence that the Venus, dated 1597, is assuredly a masterpiece by Giambologna, and it is more than probable that it was part of the bronzes presented to Henri IV by Ferdinando I de’Medici."

Charles Avery and Lars-Olof Larsson agreed as well on the attribution. Avery, Jestaz and Larsson curated the Giambologna landmark exhibition in 1978.

In 2017, there followed in The Burlington Magazine an academic debate between Diemer joined by the Swedish art historian Linda Hinners on one side and Rudigier on the other side.

In 2019/20 the bronze Venus was shown in the exhibition “Plasmato dal Fuoco. La scultura in bronzo nella Firenze degli ultimi Medici” (Forged in Fire. The bronze sculpture in the Florence under the last Medici) (Florence, Palazzo Pitti, 18 September 2019 until 12 January 2020). In the catalogue entry, the director of the Uffizi and curator of the exhibition, Eike Schmidt, calls the bronze Bathing Venus a masterpiece of 16th century Italian art. Regarding the argument over the attribution between Diemer and Rudigier in The Burlington Magazine, he considers Diemer's hypothesis as entirely disproved.

Rudigier and Truyols enlarged their publication in the Bulletin monumental to a monograph on the late Giambologna, published in 2019.

Subsequently Peter Dreyer published in 2021 and 2022 two articles delivering the palaeographical evidence that the third digit of the date reads as a 5, and demonstrating that Diemer’s approach is methodologically untenable.

Georg Satzinger who shares Dreyer´s view, published in 2023 a summary of the debate and concluded: “Finally, the evidence of Giambologna´s artistic hand as transferred into the bronze cast thanks to a perfect moulage of the original clay model and the close comparability of the Venus with other unquestionable works by the artist is a self-evident result from a genuinely art-historical analysis of the work. In its artistic elaboration and as well as in the technical achievement of the cast, the bronze Venus is a work of exceptional quality. More vividly even than the earlier marble version (…) it is a consummate demonstration of Giambologna´s art.

Claudia Kryza-Gersch wrote in 2025: "...Ferdinando I de' Medici...sent several large bronzes by Giambologna to France to adorn the park of the Château-Neuf in St-Germain-en-Laye, which the French king had laid out in the Italian style. As the castle and garden were razed to the ground in the eighteenth century, this important ensemble fell into oblivion. However Rudigier/Truyols 2019, pp. 19–45, have convincingly demonstrated that several sculptures have survived, among them...the recently discovered and much-discussed Venus, as to whose authenticity there can be no doubt."

== Literature ==
- P. Fogelman, P. Fusco and M. Cambarari, eds.: Italian and Spanish Sculpture, Catalogue of the J. Paul Getty Museum Collection, Los Angeles 2002.
- A. Rudigier, B. Truyols, with a foreword by B. Jestaz: “Jean Bologne et les jardins d’Henri IV“, Bulletin monumental 174, 3 (2016), pp. 247–373.
- D. Diemer, L. Hinners: “Gerhardt Meyer made me in Stockholm”: a bronze “Bathing woman” after Giambologna’, The Burlington Magazine 160 (2018), pp. 545–53.
- A. Rudigier, B. Truyols: “Giambologna. Court Sculptor to Ferdinando I. His art, his style and the Medici gifts to Henri IV“ (2019) pp. 44–129.
- E.D. Schmidt, S. Bellesi, R. Gennaioli, Plasmato dal Fuoco. La scultura in bronzo nella Firenze degli ultimi Medici (2019), p. 140.
- N. Hegener, Eine badende Venus im Kreuzfeuer der kunsthistorischen Kritik: Bausteine für eine Neubewertung von Giambolognas Oeuvre, in Kunstchronik (2020), p. 588.
- P. Dreyer, «Ein paläographischer Nachtrag zu Nicole Hegener „Eine badende Venus im Kreuzfeuer der kunsthistorischen Kritik“ in: Kunstchronik 73/12, 2020, 588-597» in: Kunstchronik 74, 8 (2020).
- P. Dreyer, Methodological approaches towards establishing date of origin in the case of Giambologna’s bronze figure of a Bathing Venus, in 'Studi di Storia dell'Arte 32' 2021, 2022, pp. 123.
- G. Satzinger, Giambologna’s Bronze Venus for Henri IV?, in: Marburger Jahrbuch für Kunstwissenschaft 2022 [2023], p. 129.
- C. Kryza-Gersch, Giambologna's Mars. A God as the Epitome of Masculinity, in: Body of Power. The Mars by Giambologna, ed. Stephan Koja (2025) pp. 52-73.
