= Marc Smith =

Marc Smith may refer to:

- Marc Smith (poet) (born 1949), American creator and founder of the poetry slam movement
- Marc Smith (bridge) (born 1960), British bridge player, columnist, and book author
- Marc Smith (palaeographer) (born 1963), French palaeographer

== See also ==
- Mark Smith (disambiguation)
- Marcus Smith (disambiguation)
