= Appointment with Fear =

Appointment with Fear may refer to:

- Appointment with Fear (film), a 1985 horror movie
- Appointment with Fear (radio), a BBC Radio horror series presented by Valentine Dyall, which ran for ten series between 1943 and 1955
- Appointment with F.E.A.R., a Fighting Fantasy gamebook
