= Way of the Scorpion =

Way of the Scorpion could refer to:

- Legend of the Five Rings
- Way of the Tiger
