= Sword of the Samurai =

Sword of the Samurai may refer to:

- Sword of the Samurai (1989 video game), an American MS-DOS video game
- Sword of the Samurai (2002 video game), a Japanese PlayStation 2 video game
- Sword of the Samurai (gamebook), a 1986 roleplaying gamebook by Mark Smith and Jamie Thomson
- "Sword of the Samurai" (Hawaiian Eye), a television episode
- Time Machine 3: Sword of the Samurai, a 1984 children's novel in the Time Machine series

== See also ==
- Katana, a sword with a curved, single-edged blade used by the samurai of ancient and feudal Japan
