= Talisman of Death =

Role-playing gamebook

- Cover of the first edition
- Authors: Jamie Thomson; Mark Smith
- Illustrator: Bob Harvey
- Cover artist: Peter Andrew Jones; U.S. cover: R. Courtney
- Language: English
- Series: Fighting Fantasy: Puffin number: 11; Wizard number: 24
- Genre: Fantasy
- Published: Puffin: 1985; Dell/Laurel-Leaf: 1985
- Media type: Print (Paperback)
- ISBN: 0-14-031859-3 (Puffin); ISBN 1-84046-566-2 (Wizard)

Talisman of Death is a single-player role-playing gamebook written by Jamie Thomson and Mark Smith, illustrated by Bob Harvey and originally published in 1984 by Puffin Books. It was later republished by Wizard Books in 2006. It forms part of Steve Jackson and Ian Livingstone's Fighting Fantasy series. It is the 11th in the series in the original Puffin series (ISBN 0-14-031859-3) and 24th in the modern Wizard series (ISBN 1-84046-566-2).

== Story ==
Talisman of Death is a fantasy adventure scenario in which the player must prevent the minions of the dark lord from using the Talisman of Death against the world of the Orb.

The player is given a mission to protect the world of Orb from the "Evil One", by protecting the Talisman of Death. Unlike most other Fighting Fantasy books, the player is presented as an ordinary person from Earth, drawn into the world of Orb by the will of the gods. In the book, the player is given the task of protecting the Talisman of Death. The player must find a way of returning to their own world with the Talisman, thus depriving the god Death of the Talisman forever.

=== Setting ===
Talisman of Death is the only Fighting Fantasy gamebook set in the fantasy world of Orb, a creation of Thomson and Smith for their later series of Way of the Tiger gamebooks. The majority of the story is spent in the city of "Greyguilds-on-the-moor". Characters that appear in Talisman of Death, such as Tyutchev, Cassandra, and Thaum also appear in the Way of the Tiger series. Also, Bob Harvey was the illustrator of the series.

Smith's later Virtual Reality volume The Coils of Hate featured an appearance by Tyutchev the swordsman.

== Reception ==
Chris Mitchell reviewed House of Hell and Talisman of Death for White Dwarf #66, giving it an overall rating of 9 out of 10, and stated that "The artwork in both books are of very good quality, the price is reasonable. These are two worthy additions to the collection, and I hope to see more of Jamie Thomson's and Mark Smith's work soon."

== Reviews ==
- Review by Dave Mead (1985) in Fantasy Review, November 1985
