= Female Figure (Giambologna) =

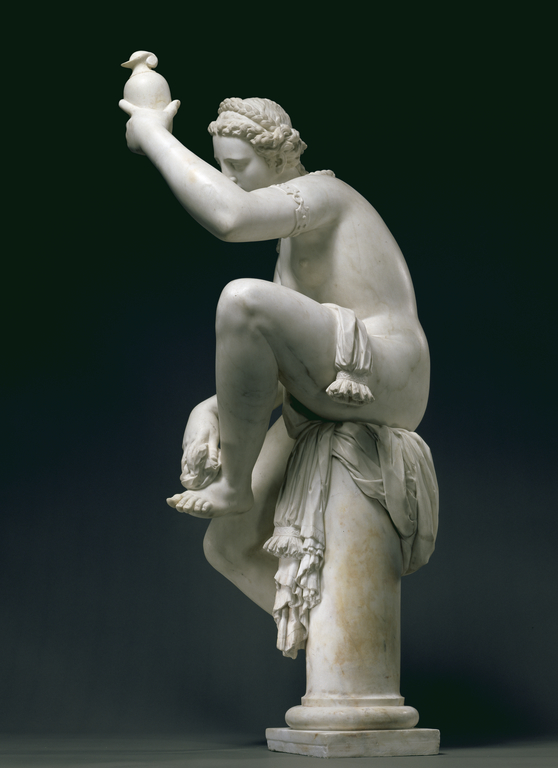
Female Figure, 1571–1573, J. Paul Getty Museum

Female Figure is a near life-size 16th century marble statue by the Flemish sculptor Giambologna. It measures 114.9 cm (45 1/4 in.) and depicts an unidentified woman who may be Bathsheba, Venus or another mythological person. The work dates from 1571 to 1573, early in the artist's career, and has been held by the J. Paul Getty Museum since 1982 (inv. 82.SA.37). The woman is nude save for a bracelet on her upper left arm and a discarded garment covering her lap. She sits on a column draped with cloths, holding a jar in one hand, drying her left foot with the other.

The work's dating and attribution was debated for centuries, though it is now confidently associated with Giambologna due to its similarity to several other known works by him, including the Florence Triumphant over Pisa now in the Victoria and Albert Museum. The statue has been restored twice and is in relatively good condition.

== Description ==
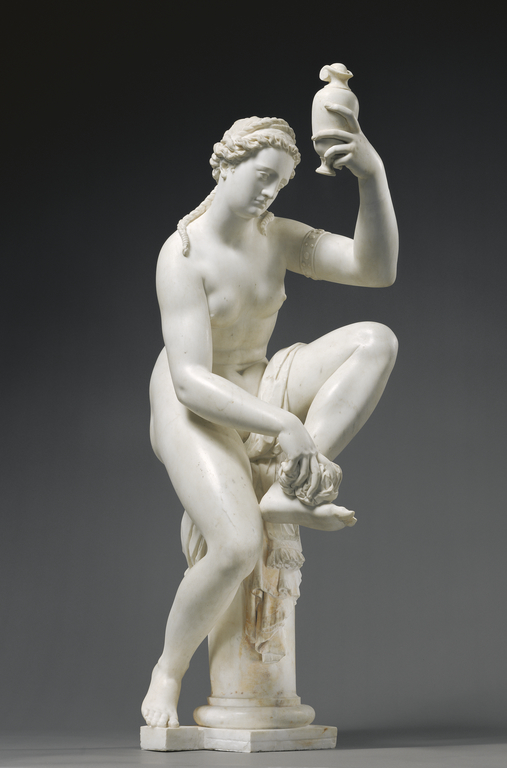
Female Figure, 1565, J. Paul Getty Museum

The sculpture is carved from a single block of white Carrara marble and it measures 115 cm (45 1/4 in.). In the typology of its time the figure represents a Bathing Venus. In a Bavarian document of 1635 the sculpture is called for the first time "Bathsheba", a naming that was maintained until it was acquired by the J. Paul Getty Museum. As shown by Herbert Keutner this subject was unknown in Florentine late Renaissance art and therefore this naming cannot be original. By this renaming the frivolous figure was reinterpreted as a representation of morally reprehensive sexual desire, reflecting the new prudish atmosphere of the catholic Counterreformation. The work is generally believed to be the figure of a seated girl mentioned by Giambologna's second biographer Raffaello Borghini (1584), which was sent to the Duke of Bavaria ("...figura di marmo à sedere della grandezza d'una fanciulla di sedici anni, la quale fu mandata al Duca di Baviera"). However, there are no Florentine documents known relating to its manufacture. Moreover, "no documents concerning the statue's transfer to Germany have yet been found". Its dating ca. 1571-73 is based on the relative chronology of Giambologna's oeuvre given by Borghini.

The woman about to wash herself sits on a truncated column. Her pose is complex, with her weight resting mostly on her left buttock. Her left leg is raised, her knee sharply bent. Save for a bracelet on her upper left arm she is nude. She sits on her discarded Chemise with embroidered cuffs which partly covers her left lap. With her risen left hand she holds a jar (partly a later replacement). Originally she held a different kind of vessel serving to pour water. Her right hand holds a small cloth which she uses to clean her left foot. The head is inclined downwards, and her eyes are blank giving her an inscrutable expression. The shape of her eyes, her nose and her mouth is taken from classical Roman sculpture as well as her hair-style. Charles Avery describes the pose as "The impression is of a momentary action that has been frozen: the left arm and leg both project well forward, suspended freely in space, in an extraordinary pose that is the antithesis of the canonical Renaissance contrapposto".

According to the Getty, her complex positioning shows her "bathing in a graceful serpentine pose, characteristic of Mannerist elegance ... figura serpentinata". Other art historians describe her unusual bodily positioning as evidencing an "anxious grace". Avery thinks that given the somewhat awkward pose the statue was intended to be placed in a niche, as "the frontal view is curiously constricted and the most satisfactory one is diagonally from the left."

== Identity of the figure ==
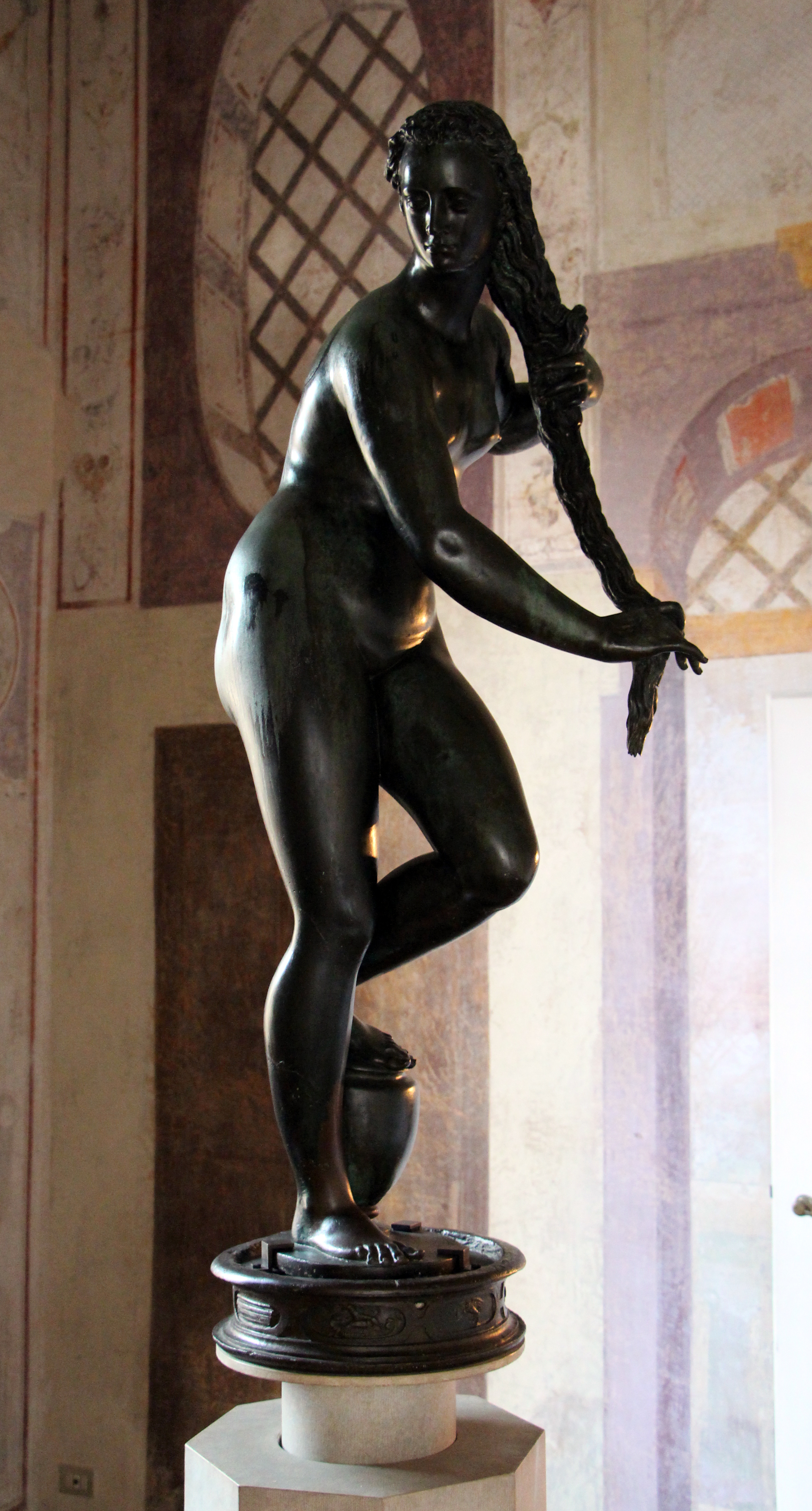
Giambologna: Venus Anadyomene, Villa La Petraia, Florence

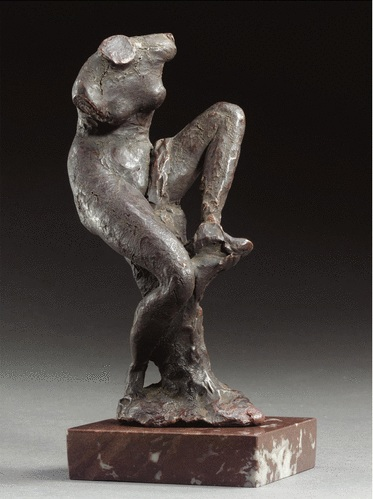
Giambologna: Seated Woman, red wax, private collection

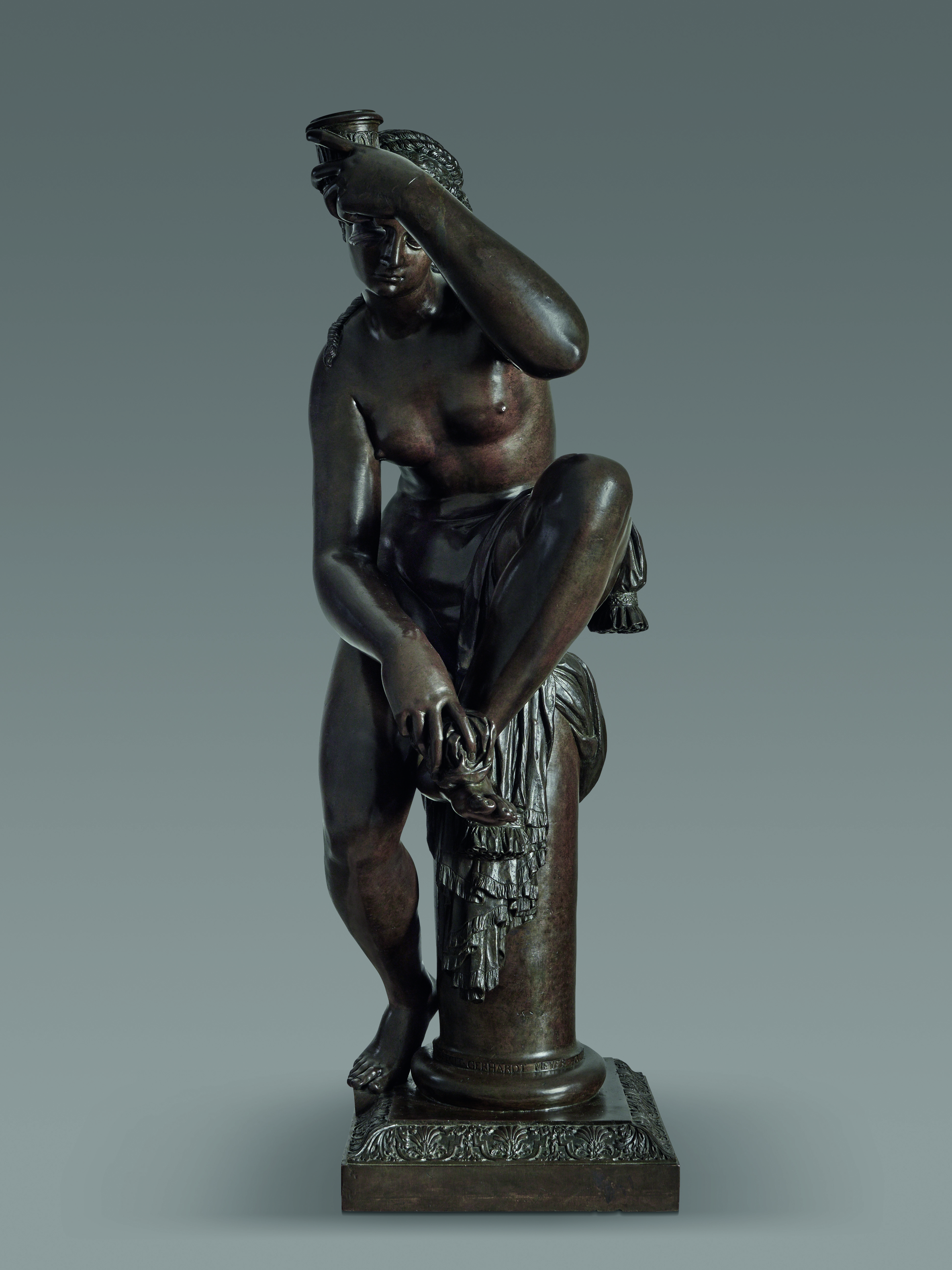
Bathing Venus (Bronze), attributed to Giambologna (1597); Dimension: 1,12 m height; Owner: Private Collection

Avery suggests a now lost ancient Roman figure of a Bathing Venus as a possible source, one he identifies in a drawing showing three points of view, made by Maarten van Heemskerck during a visit to Rome around 1535. In this lost work, the figure stands on her right leg, and is largely supported by her left buttock which rests on a pedestal. Similar to Giambologna's figure, this woman also bends forward to clean her left leg. Other sources might have been Raphael's Psyche being carried by Cupid (1517–18, Rome, Villa Farnesina) and Michelangelo's Ignudi (Rome, Vatican, Sistine Chapel, 1508–12). A red wax model attributed to Giambologna (private collection), which is missing its limbs and head, and slumps backwards, is close in pose to the Getty-statue, especially in the left shoulder and angle of the neck.

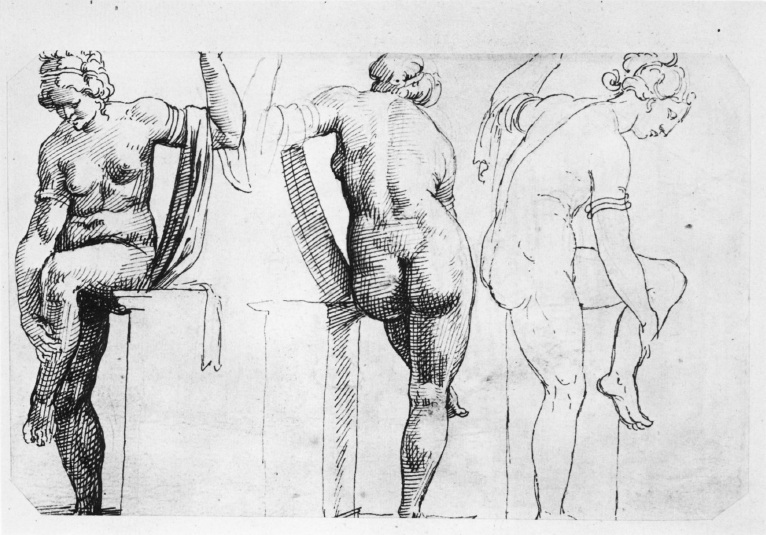
Bathing Venus, ink on paper drawing, Maarten van Heemskerck

There is a bronze Bathing Venus representing the same model of the marble with differences in posture and details, signed by its caster: "Me fecit Gerhardt Meyer Homiae/ Den 25 November 1597". It was first published in 2002 as a later Swedish aftercast of the Getty-marble. Today it is considered by a number of leading scholars as Giambologna's autograph version of the Getty-marble in pristine condition, possibly made for King Henri IV of France. Charles Avery, already in 1983 when publishing the Getty-marble, observed that the pose of the Bathing Venus "would be easier to render using the tensile structure of metal- i. e. bronze over an iron armature".

== Condition ==
The figure was already described as damaged in 1757. The figure has been restored twice, the first time in Sweden, probably during the late eighteenth century, and the second time in 1980/81 while in London. The lower part of the column was broken into several pieces. The thumb and index finger of the left hand and most of the goblet are lost, as are three of the toes of the left foot and the tip of the nose. All these losses were replaced during the 1980 restoration.

During the second restoration, the original vessel was erroneously reconstructed by imitating the jar of Adriaen de Vries' later Mercury and Psyche group (Paris, Louvre). The result, wrong in shape and dimension, disturbs the harmony of Giambologna's creation. Other repairs during this conservation removed iron stains and fixed a number of cracks along her body. The figure must have been exposed to the elements for a long time in Sweden. A drawing for various garden ornaments by Johan Hårleman (1662-1707) (Stockholm, Nationalmuseum) shows the design for a base to be made in 1703 for it as a garden figure. The original surface is only preserved on the hair, where it is heavily weathered. The rest of the figure is repolished. This has altered the facial expression, particularly by retouching the shape of the mouth. A "channel system" inside Venus has been interpreted as equipment for transforming Venus into a fountain figure, but is more likely to have served to bring in a metal structure stabilising the marble.

== Attribution and provenance ==
It must have been a Medici commission, either of Cosimo I or, more likely, of his son Francesco I de' Medici. From Borghini's quotation does not result to which one of three possible Dukes of Bavaria it was sent as a diplomatic gift. Then, in 1635 the figure seems to be mentioned among works of art that had been plundered from the Munich Residenz by Swedish troops in 1632 during the Thirty Years' War and whose whereabouts Maximilian I, Elector of Bavaria wanted to know about. One of his magistrates reported that a life size marble statue of a Bathsheba was brought to Stockholm on the orders of King Gustavus Adolphus. This identification of the Getty-marble with the figure mentioned by Borghini and in this Bavarian document, is however contradicted by Lauritz de Thurah (Den danske Vitruvius, 1746) claiming that the sculpture was part of the Swedish war booty from Prague in 1648. No details are known about the figure's early provenance in Sweden. Nicodemus Tessin the Younger mentions the statue in 1688 in his travel notes as being in Sweden without giving its precise location. At the same time Tessin attributed the statue to Giambologna by means of stylistic comparison. Soon aftercasts of the now prestigious figure were made in Sweden in plaster and metal. Five of these aftercasts (one in lead and four in plaster) are still preserved in the bathroom of the Swedish Ericsberg Palace and another in lead in the Royal Danish Fredensborg Palace. Due to a primitive moulding process, they are simplified reproductions of the marble original. Yet they still document the original shape of the vessel of Giambologna's figure.

In 1703, when Hårleman made the above-mentioned design for a base for the statue, it was in the property of the "Grand maître [de la cour de Suède]" whom Avery identified with Johann-Gabriel Stenbock (1640-1705). The first Swedish owner one can name precisely was Eric Sparre (1665-1726) who owned the figure around 1715. By descent it came to Carl Gustaf Tessin (1695-1770) who then acquired in 1747 the manor of Akerö in Södermansland. The figure is unlikely to have come to Akerö before 1757, the year in which the newly built manor house was ready. It features there in a general inventory drawn up the same year. The figure appears again in 1770 in the auction catalogue to sell the contents of Akerö, but it was unsold. Therefore, it remained in Akerö, under various owners, until the late 1970s.

Giambologna's figure had fallen into oblivion until 1970 when Gunnar W. Lundberg first published it in a Swedish art historical journal. It was acquired by the Getty Museum in 1982 from Daniel Katz, London, and was the first major work of Renaissance sculpture purchased by the museum. Objections to the attribution were raised at the time of its reappearance by Sir John Pope-Hennessy. Since, it is generally accepted. The leading Giambologna experts Charles Avery (1893) and Herbert Keutner (1987) both dedicated articles to this figure. Together with the Triton in the Metropolitan Museum of Art in New York the Bathing Venus is today the only large figure by Giambologna outside Europe, and one of the most important sculptures of the Italian Renaissance in the US.
