= Warrior Kings =

2002 video game

- European cover art
- Developer(s): Black Cactus, Zonic
- Publisher(s): Microïds, Feral Interactive
- Designer(s): Dave Morris, Charlie Bewsher, Steven Bristow
- Platform(s): Windows, Mac OS, Mac OS X
- Release: 2002, 2003 (Mac)
- Genre(s): Real-time strategy
- Mode(s): Single player, Multiplayer

Warrior Kings is a real-time strategy video game, developed by Black Cactus and published by Microïds in 2002. It was published for the Mac OS X the following year by Feral Interactive. The game, set in a fantasy medieval world, focuses on the concepts of pagan tribalism, renaissance enlightenment, and imperialist theocracy.

== Gameplay ==
There are three different paths to choose in this game: 'Pagan', 'Imperial' and 'Renaissance', each with its own unique values, style of war, and storyline.

=== Plot ===
The story revolves around Artos, the young son of Baron Amalric of Cravant, a small fiefdom within the Holy Empire, the dominant power in a world called Orbis. The Holy Empire is a theocratic state (seemingly an amalgamation of the Roman Empire, Holy Roman Empire and the Papal States) devoted to a deity called 'The One God'. It is ruled by a spiritual and militant leader, the Patriarch and the Holy Protector respectively. The new Patriarch, Icthyus Granitas, is cruel and corrupt and the Holy Protector is nothing more than his henchman. As soon as he came to power he began accusing all those who spoke against his rule with false charges of heresy and treason to the state. These lords either changed their minds overnight about the Patriarch or disappeared entirely.

Cravant is one such state. On the first level of the game, Cravant is invaded by the Empire, who kill Artos's father on a trumped up charge of treason and raze the city. Artos flees with a small band of loyal soldiers across the sea to Angland (a fictionalised England) where he plots his revenge against the Empire.

From there, the player can decide how they do this. There are three 'alignments' that the player can choose from that are listed below. These are Pagan, Imperial and Renaissance.

=== The Pagan path ===
The Pagan path is one of superstition, witchcraft, and nature worship. Pagan war involves cheap mass-produced units in combination with indirect damage to one's opposition. The successful pagan player is one who tests enemy borders on a regular basis and then moves to overwhelm it while not counting the cost. Pagan signature units are its demons and witches, all of which have a series of secondary powers and spells to employ against their foes. Once they have become suitably advanced the Pagans may construct a Wickerman and summon a demon called Abaddon, a powerful AI controlled unit that can cause a lot of damage before being destroyed.

=== The Imperial path ===
Imperial warfare involves expensive, well-armoured troops and strong fortifications. The successful Imperial player waits and watches behind thick, protective walls until the enemy makes a critical error, then punishes them for it. Signature units for the Imperials are its Priests, Bishops and Inquisitors, who can pray at churches to activate 'Acts of God' to unleash upon their enemies. As with the Pagans, the Imperials can build an Archangel Statue later on in the game and summon an Archangel named the Sword of God, who acts in a similar fashion to Abaddon.

=== The Renaissance path ===
The path of the Renaissance is one of human ingenuity and humanity. The Renaissance means giving up some offensive and defensive capability, but with it comes outstanding economy and powerful siegecraft. The Renaissance player knows the enemy and adjusts accordingly. Renaissance players are made unique by their access to gunpowder units, such as gunners and cannons. Though they do not have a demon or angel to aid them, Renaissance players can construct a series of siege engines such as trebuchets, mangonels and even primitive rocket launchers that more than compensate for this loss.

=== Military power ===
Winning in 'Warrior Kings' is not about who has more troops but rather who has better tactics. From higher ground arrows travel farther, flat ground allows mounted troops to move faster.

Troop formation is also a factor; troops will gain more attack power in a vanguard, move faster in a pillar, cover more ground in a line, and balance damage to them better in an orb.

== Development ==
Warrior Kings started life at the back-end of Eidos plc's title: Plague, the first large-scale full 3D strategy title featured at E3/LA in 1997. Plague was originally designed by Dave Morris from a concept by Ian Livingstone, and the technology was designed and developed by Sam Kerbeck. When Eidos closed the internal game development division at its corporate HQ in 1999, the Plague team transferred to a new company, Black Cactus, which continued to develop the game, now titled Warrior Kings, initially with investment from Eidos. With the winding-up of Black Cactus in January 2005, rights in the game reverted to Dave Morris.

Creative Director Jamie Thomson said historical events provided the inspiration for the game, which made the game world "much more fully realised and logically consistent".

== Reception ==
Reception

Review score
Publication	Score
The Guardian	4/5

In The Video Games Guide, critic Matt Fox described the game as "ambitious" with "true 3D environments", but criticized the overall gameplay and AI interaction.

== Sequel ==
In 2003, the game was followed up by a sequel, Warrior Kings: Battles.
