= Avenger (1986 video game) =

1986 video game

Way of the Tiger II: Avenger
- Developer: Gremlin Graphics
- Publisher: Gremlin Graphics
- Platforms: Commodore 64, Amstrad CPC, ZX Spectrum, MSX
- Release: 1986

Way of the Tiger II: Avenger is a video game released in 1986 by Gremlin Graphics for the Commodore 64, Amstrad CPC, ZX Spectrum, and MSX. it is based on gamebook series Way of the Tiger.

== Gameplay ==
Yaemon the Grand Master of Flame has killed the player's foster-father Naijish and stolen the Scrolls of Kettsuin. To recover the scrolls, the player must find enough keys to penetrate the Quench Heart Keep, and then kill each of the three guards. The game is viewed from above and superficially resembles Gauntlet.

== Reception ==
Reception

Awards
Publication	Award
Sinclair User	SU Classic
Your Sinclair	YS Megagame

Guy Langley for Computer and Video Games compared the game to Gauntlet, noting that Avenger was more of an adventure and has "smarter graphics".

Rich Pelley for Your Sinclair gave the game a rating of 86 and praised its variety, with elements of maze games, beat-em ups, and puzzlers.

Zzap! rated the game at 86%, calling it "highly competent".

Mike Roberts for Computer Gamer rated the game at 85% overall and complimented the life energy system.

Amtix rated the game at 73% overall, noting that it was too similar to the original Way of the Tiger.

Commodore User scored the game 7 out of 10 overall, noting its "tough arcade adventure-style".
