= Marcus Smith =

Marcus Smith may refer to:

- Marcus Smith (defensive lineman, born 1984), American football defensive tackle
- Marcus Smith (rugby union) (born 1999), English rugby union player
- Marcus Smith (wide receiver) (born 1985), American football wide receiver
- Marcus Smith II (born 1992), American football defensive end
- Marcus A. Smith (1851–1924), United States Senator from Arizona
- Marcus C. Smith (1825–1900), American politician in Indiana
- Marcus G. Smith (born 1973), president and chief operating officer and director of NASCAR track owner Speedway Motorsports, Inc.
- Sir Marcus Smith (judge), British judge

== See also ==
- Marc Smith (disambiguation)
- Mark Smith (disambiguation)
