= Fabled Lands =

Fantasy game book series

Fabled Lands is a series of fantasy gamebooks written by established gamebook authors Dave Morris and Jamie Thomson and published by Pan Books, a division of Macmillan in the mid 1990s. Cover art was by Kevin Jenkins with Russ Nicholson and Arun Pottier providing maps and illustrations.

Originally planned as a twelve-book series, only six were released between 1995 and 1996 before the series was cancelled. The first two books were also printed under the name Quest in the U.S. by publishers Price Stern Sloan. A Kickstarter campaign was launched in 2015 in order to fund the production of a seventh book, which reached its base target within 45 minutes.

== Overview ==
The Fabled Lands books deviated from other mainstream gamebooks (such as the Fighting Fantasy or Lone Wolf series) in a number of ways. The most notable of these was the open-ended, free roaming gameplay. Other gamebooks gave the character a linear quest, with some leniency in how they went about accomplishing it; when they completed the quest, the gamebook ended. The Fabled Lands series gave the player an entire fantasy world to roam around in, doing whatever they wished with no limits or linearity; there was no set quest (although there is a choice of quests) and there is no way to "finish" the series (unless the player dies). There are hundreds of quests in the seven books that were published, of varying lengths. The player is free to pursue these at their leisure, or spend their time doing entirely different things—wandering, trading, exploring or building up their abilities.

Each book contained a different geographic area of the Fabled Lands, and the player could easily travel between regions by switching to another book. The books became increasingly difficult as they progressed, with tougher enemies and harder quests; this was to account for the player becoming more powerful as they went through each book.

Other differences between previous gamebook series included:

- A greater number of sections, 679 to 1200
- Large (A4) format with fold-out character sheet and colour map
- Open-ended trade via marketplace goods, investment or shipping
- Acquisition of large assets such as houses and ships
- Plot discovery through use of uncovered keywords

Although the final six books in the series were neither published nor written in the 1990s, Dave Morris has indicated in the past that he is interested in reviving the series, saying in an interview:

I'd love to complete the series. It would take some time to get back into the flow of it, but I still have our (very extensive) notes. I would think the first step might be to set up books 1–6 as Web pages and see what kind of interest they generated. This, I think, is a better format for gamebooks now—we are no longer in the era of the printed word. If that worked out, and the net publisher could set up a subscription system, I think Fabled Lands and many other gamebook series could enjoy quite a renaissance.

On September 13, 2010, Dave Morris indicated that the series had a possible chance of a revival on his blog, saying, in response to a fan query about the future of the fabled lands and particularly the book The Serpent King's Domain, "My lips are sealed, though I will say that Frank Johnson, the head of Fabled Lands LLP, was throwing those same words around last week. He might even have thrown in a labyrinth and some legions :)". In a later announcement, Morris indicated that the publisher was willing to greenlight the production of books 7–12 of the series, provided that the reprintings of books 1–6 each sold approximately ten thousand copies.

In 2015, Book 7 of the series, titled "The Serpent-King's Domain," was funded successfully via a Kickstarter campaign, about 20 years after the last book was written. While series creators Morris and Thomson did not write Book 7, they were involved with the Kickstarter campaign, and Thomson appeared in-person in a promotional video for the Kickstarter campaign. Paul Gresty wrote Book 7, and Mikaël Louys and Richard S. Hetley co-produced. Russ Nicholson returned to provide illustrations and Kevin Jenkins returned to create the cover of Book 7. A playable demo of Book 7 was made available to the public for free download via the Kickstarter campaign page. In 2016, Morris revealed the map of Ankon-Konu, the setting for Book 7, on the Fabled Lands blog. Book 7 is currently available for purchase.

== System ==
The Fabled Lands system was fairly simple, as with most other gamebooks. The player has six basic attributes:

- Charisma—the knack of befriending and impressing people; also represents bardic skills
- Combat—fighting skills
- Magic—the art of casting spells
- Sanctity—the gift of divine power and wisdom
- Scouting—the techniques of tracking and wilderness lore
- Thievery—the talent for stealth, agility and lock picking

The player's initial score in each of these six attributes is determined by their chosen profession. There are six different professions to choose from: Warrior, Mage, Priest, Rogue, Troubadour and Wayfarer (a wandering traveller, most similar to Rangers in other fantasy systems). Each profession is proficient or weak in different abilities; for example, Priests have high SANCTITY but low COMBAT scores, and Wayfarers have high SCOUTING but low CHARISMA scores. The player has opportunities to increase these abilities throughout the books by completing quests. For example, after successfully tracking down a wild boar in a forest, the player can roll two dice, and if they score higher than their SCOUTING ability they can increase it by 1. No ability can be raised higher than 12, or drop below 1.

When the player is given the opportunity to use an ability, the task is given a Difficulty rating. The player rolls two dice and adds their score in the ability; to succeed in the task, they must score higher than the difficulty. For example, a player wishes to calm down an angry innkeeper. This might have a CHARISMA score of 9, and the player's CHARISMA ability is 3. The player would have to roll 7 or higher to succeed. It is possible to obtain "blessings" in various abilities from different shrines and temples, which allow the player to reroll failed ability rolls. These work once only, however, and cost money.

Combat in the Fabled Lands is an extension of ability rolls; the enemy's DEFENSE is the Difficulty, and the player uses their COMBAT skill to try to defeat their opponent. The amount the player rolls above the enemy's DEFENSE is how many Stamina points the enemy loses.

The player's own DEFENSE score is equal to their Rank + their COMBAT score + the bonus for any armor they are wearing (if any). Their own Stamina score is given when they begin playing, and can be increased by going up in Rank (which gives them 1d6 Stamina).

The player's starting Rank is equal to the number of the book they begin in (e.g. a player starting in the first book begins at 1st Rank, while a player starting in the sixth book begins at 6th Rank). The player can increase Rank by performing extremely difficult tasks, such as slaying a dragon or defeating three samurai in unarmed combat (the book will tell the player when they can increase in Rank).

The player can carry up to 12 possessions, which are marked in bold text (e.g. "gold compass"). Some items give ability bonuses - for example, an "amber wand (MAGIC +1)" or a set of "splint armour (DEFENCE + 4)". The player can carry unlimited amounts of cash.

The series feature a number of smaller quests, which can help the player increase their personal might, status and wealth. Many of these, however, are profession-specific: In the War-Torn Kingdom, for instance, only a Wayfarer will get the Chief Druid's mission on the Druid's Isle, while in The Plains of Howling Darkness only a Rogue may claim the title of 'Nightstalker'.

== Books ==
=== 1. The War-Torn Kingdom (1995) ===
Sokara, a nation at war with itself

Set in the land of Sokara, shortly after a civil war in which the king was overthrown in a military coup. This background provides the book's two major quests; the player can choose to either help the heir to the throne and his band of partisans regain power, or assist the new leader General Grieve Marlock in crushing the last few pockets of resistance.

Other quests involve assassinating the king of the rat-men infesting the sewers in the city of Yellowport, looting treasure from the lair of Vayss the Sea Dragon, delivering packages between the druids of the City of Trees and the Forest of Larun, defeating the Black Dragon Knight in combat to the death and rescuing a trapped god from the summit of Devil's Peak.

679 sections, ISBN 0-330-33614-2

=== 2. Cities of Gold and Glory (1995) ===
Golnir, a wealthy land steeped in curious folklore

Set in the prosperous kingdom of Golnir, wealthy from its rich agriculture. A common complaint readers had about the second book was that it was far more difficult to find quests than in the first book. There are still several major quests, however, including slaying a dragon for the Baroness Ravayne (the ruler of Golnir), searching for magical artefacts for the wizard Estragon, bringing to justice a murderer on behalf of his victim's ghost, finding the key of stars to gain access to a treasure filled tomb in the Forest of the Forsaken and making a map of the northern mountains.

The quests in the second book have a more whimsical, fairy tale nature to them than those in the first book. This gives Golnir a very strong Merry England atmosphere.

786 sections, ISBN 0-330-33615-0

=== 3. Over the Blood-Dark Sea (1995) ===
Swashbuckling adventure on the high seas

Set in the Violet Ocean, which separates the northern continent of Harkuna from the southern continent of Ankon-Konu. Travel is severely restricted without a ship, making it a difficult book to start off in, particularly for less experienced gamebook readers. Over the Blood-Dark Sea is also one of the first in the series to feature regular danger—the player is almost always at risk of pirates, storms and even sea monsters.

Key quests include assassinating Amcha, king of the pirates, enrolling at a wizard's college in the city of Dweomer to learn magic, searching for buried treasure on hidden islands and climbing the enormous mountain on Starspike Island.

718 sections, ISBN 0-330-34172-3

=== 4. The Plains of Howling Darkness (1995) ===
The desolate wastes of the Great Steppes

Set in the Great Steppes, an environment of grasslands, plains and tundra similar to Siberia and Mongolia. Key quests include liberating the Citadel of Veris Corin for the King of Sokara (closely linked with quests in The War-Torn Kingdom), releasing the King of Harkuna from his prison underneath the Rimewater (closely linked with quests in The Court of Hidden Faces) and killing the immortal tyrant Kaschuf (based on the legend of Koschei the Deathless) who rules over the village of Vodhya (which requires the player to find and release his soul, hidden on an island in Over The Blood-Dark Sea).

This was the first book in the series to introduce the concept of a harsh environment—out on the Steppes, the player must make constant SCOUTING rolls in order to find enough food, and on the northern steppes the player loses one point of stamina a day from the cold, unless they have a wolf pelt to keep warm.

710 sections, ISBN 0-330-34173-1

=== 5. The Court of Hidden Faces (1996) ===
Exotic intrigue in Uttaku and Old Harkuna

Set in the nation of Uttaku (similar to the Byzantine Empire), which is occupying the kingdom of Old Harkuna (similar to the lands of Arthurian legend). If the player frees the king of Old Harkuna from his prison in The Plains of Howling Darkness, the king can reclaim his land, end the Uttaku occupation and restore prosperity. There is also an abandoned castle in Harkuna which the player can rebuild and claim for himself. Most other major quests involve undertaking tasks for the Uttakin government (the titular Court).

The book takes its title from Uttaku's court of ruling nobles, who wear elaborate masks as a status symbol and to hide their faces. The king himself is born without a face at all.

723 sections, ISBN 0-330-34431-5

=== 6. Lords of the Rising Sun (1996) ===
Imperial Akatsurai, land of samurai and ninja

Set in a land which is an obvious parallel of classical Japan of the Heian period. Much like The War Torn Kingdom, a revolution is occurring. The self-proclaimed Shogun Yoritomo has declared himself in charge of the eastern seaboard, while the young Imperial Sovereign Takakura rules the country nominally, with real power being in the hands of the chancellor, Lord Kiyomori, who remains in control of the western seaboard. The country is on the brink of a civil war (like Japan during the Genpei War to which the names "Yoritomo" and "Kiyomori" allude). Although the player can undertake quests for both sides of the revolution, the two forces never actually begin war as they do in the first book.

Other major quests involving retrieving a tatsu pearl from a great dragon, exploring Kwaidan Forest to learn the secrets of the tengu, and venturing into the Black Pagoda.

750 sections, ISBN 0-330-34430-7

=== 7. The Serpent King's Domain (2018) ===
The lost tribes of the Feathered Lands

Set in the jungles of the southern continent of Ankon-Konu, a land similar to South America.

This book was not published in the 1990s, but in 2018 after a successful Kickstarter campaign. It was written by Paul Gresty. The spirit realm, Elaz Carnquen, hangs closely over this world, which allows you travel into the spirit realm and engage in spiritual combat using a new value called "Nahual." Due to the excessive heat of Ankon-Konu, many types of armor (such as plate armor) handicap the player's COMBAT value if worn, and other types of armor (such as cotton armor) provide lower defense bonuses without handicaps to a player's COMBAT value. Quests include activating the titan at Borotek, restoring order at Ruined Tarshesh over who was to blame for its fall, defeating the Serpent King, Namagal (which requires some mini-quests on its own), and merging with the verdant spire, which allows dominance over the land itself.

1200 sections, ISBN 1-909-90530-5

== Reception ==
Scott Malthouse of The Trollish Delver gave the Fabled Lands series a positive review based upon a playthrough of Book 1, remarking that "Fabled Lands is nothing short of astonishing. It presents a living world that you can do pretty much what you want in. With other books added to your repertoire there is seemingly no end to the adventures that you can have in this fantasy world."

Steve Faragher reviewed the Fabled Lands series for Arcane magazine, rating it a 5 out of 10 overall. Faragher comments that "All in all, these books represent a pleasant but ultimately unchallenging diversion for younger players. A better option would be to get someone older to run a simple AD&D game."

Byron Alexander Campbell of Entropy magazine gave the Fabled Lands series a more positive review based upon a playthrough of Book 5, remarking "It's not perfect, of course—there's a bit too much ticking and erasing boxes, especially when death is always so close on your heels—but damn if it's not satisfying. For reasons I can't quite describe, being able to trace roads and geographic features on a map and read my way through those same locations, but full of people, weather and birdsong, just feels great... One of the most enticing things about Fabled Lands is the way that every book provides a way in. Each book is a microcosm of the same world, and while they get progressively more challenging with each successive release, there is nothing narratively that compels you to read them in order."

== Spinoffs ==
=== App ===
Two iPad, iPhone and iPod Touch applications were developed by Megara Entertainment. The first app, based on The War-Torn Kingdom, included new colour art and original coloured in art from Russ Nicholson, and was released on January 20, 2011. The second app was released in June, 2011. Following Megara's decision to withdraw from app development in 2012, digital rights reverted to the authors and the apps were withdrawn from sale.

=== Roleplaying game ===
A Fabled Lands Role Playing Game and 12 source books based on the original game books were planned to be written by Shane Garvey and Jamie Wallis of Greywood Publishing, however only the core book and the first source book (titled Sokara - The War-Torn Kingdom) were released. The RPG rules were based on the original rules of the game books but expanded to accommodate an adventuring party in a pen-and-paper roleplaying context, rather than as a gamebook experience for a solo player. The RPG and first of the source books were released in mid-2011.

=== Planned MMO ===
In 1996, the authors decided to use their experience with gamebooks to enter the computer games industry—taking the Fabled Lands series with them. They started work at Eidos Interactive on an MMO. Eidos was sceptical as to whether an MMO could be successful, but was interested to see what might happen, and set the authors up with a team to research the relevant technology. The team's plans for the game were extremely ambitious for the late 1990s, as the Fabled Lands MMO was supposed to include an advanced AI that acted as a digital gamesmaster, tailoring the experience for each player.

The game was never released; according to Morris and Thomson, this was caused by their own over-ambitious designs, colleagues who didn't understand their ideas and the general poor management of game design and development at the time.

=== Computer game ===
Twenty-five years after the Fabled Lands books were published, Morris and Thomson granted a license to Prime Games to develop a Fabled Lands computer role-playing game. The standalone game is based on content from four of the gamebooks: The War-Torn Kingdom, Cities of Gold and Glory, The Plains of Howling Darkness, and The Court of the Hidden Faces. Together, these books cover the northern continent of Harkuna and its surrounding coastal waters, forming a complete open-ended adventure.

The cRPG was released on Steam in Early Access in 2021, followed by a full release a year later on May 26, 2022. The reception on Steam is Very Positive, with an average score of 8.1/10 based on over 500 user reviews. On December 2, 2022, the cRPG was also released on GOG as a DRM-free game.

Several expansions were released, adapting the remaining published gamebooks. On February 16, 2023, the first DLC expansion based on book 6, Lords of the Rising Sun, was released. On May 23, 2024, a second DLC expansion based on books 3, Over the Blood-Dark Sea, and 7, The Serpent King's Domain, followed. On November 27, 2025, the DLC The Castle of Lost Souls was released, adapting the Fabled Lands Quests book of the same name by Paul Gresty.

On October 5, 2023, Fabled Lands was released on the Nintendo Switch for Europe, Australia, and the Americas.

== See also ==
- Choose Your Own Adventure
- Fighting Fantasy
