= House of Hell =

Book by Steve Jackson

- Cover of the first edition
- Author: Steve Jackson
- Illustrator: Tim Sell
- Cover artist: Puffin: Ian Miller; Wizard: Nicholas Halliday
- Series: Fighting Fantasy: Puffin number: 10; Wizard number: 7
- Genre: Fantasy; Location: Earth
- Publication date: Puffin: 1984; Dell/Laurel-Leaf: 1985; Wizard: 2002
- Media type: Print (Paperback)
- ISBN: 0-14031-831-3 (Puffin); ISBN 1-84046-417-8 (Wizard)

House of Hell (House of Hades in the United States) is a single-player adventure gamebook written by Steve Jackson, illustrated by Tim Sell and originally published in 1984 by Puffin Books. It was later republished by Wizard Books in 2002. It forms part of Steve Jackson and Ian Livingstone's Fighting Fantasy series. It is the 10th in the series in the original Puffin series (ISBN 0-14-031831-3) and 7th in the modern Wizard series (ISBN 1-84046-417-8). A digital version was developed by Tin Man Games for Microsoft Windows, Mac, Linux, Android and iOS.

== Creation ==
A short version of the adventure was first published in Warlock: The Fighting Fantasy Magazine. Originally 185 references, the adventure was modified and expanded to 400 references for the final title.

== Rules ==
As with titles such as Appointment with F.E.A.R. and Sword of the Samurai, House of Hell utilizes an additional game mechanic; in this instance, "Fear Points", which the player will occasionally accrue. If too many Fear Points are accumulated the story ends, as the character is literally scared to death.

== Story ==
House of Hell is a horror story in which the protagonist must escape a haunted house, and survive against monsters such as skeletons, zombies, ghosts, and vampires.

At first a guest, the player discovers the house is home to Satan-worshippers and various monsters. Gameplay is initially devoted to finding a means of escape, although after finding a series of clues, the player must first defeat the evil presiding over the house.

== In other media ==
- A digital version developed by Tin Man Games is available for Android and iOS.
- In 2010, Super Team Film Prods secured the rights to House of Hell, with the intention to make a motion picture based on the title.

== Reception ==
In the June 1985 edition of White Dwarf (Issue #66), Chris Mitchell thought the artwork was "of very good quality", the price was reasonable, and the book was a worthy addition to the Fighting Fantasy collection.
