= Mark L. Smith (physician) =

American physician

Mark L. Smith MD, FACS
- Education: Albert Einstein College of Medicine
- Alma mater: Cornell University
- Occupation: Surgeon
- Years active: 1991–present
- Employer(s): Mount Sinai Health System; Beth Israel Medical Center
- Website: marksmithmd.com

Mark L. Smith is an American physician and plastic surgeon based in New York City. He is chief of Plastic Surgery at Mount Sinai Beth Israel Beth Israel Medical Center, director of Plastic Surgery for Continuum Cancer Centers of New York, director of the Friedman Center for Lymphedema Research and Treatment, co-director of the Lipedema Project, and professor of Surgery at Icahn School of Medicine at Mount Sinai. His areas of focus include microsurgical breast reconstruction, head and neck reconstruction, facial paralysis, reconstruction of congenital defects and the surgical treatment of lymphedema and lipedema.

== Early life and education ==
Smith was born in Huntington, New York.

He attended college at Cornell University in Ithaca, New York and graduated with a BA in biology in 1987. In 1991, he earned his medical degree from the Albert Einstein College of Medicine in the Bronx, New York.

== Career ==
Smith is chief of Plastic Surgery at Mount Sinai Beth Israel Medical Center. He has been an attending physician at Mount Sinai Morningside and Mount Sinai West since 1999, at the New York Eye and Ear Infirmary since 2001, and at St. Vincent's Medical Center from 2002 to 2010. He serves as director of Plastic Surgery for Continuum Cancer Centers of New York, a multi-hospital cancer program including Beth Israel, Mount Sinai Morningside, Mount Sinai West, and New York Eye and Ear Infirmary. He has developed numerous programs at Continuum, including the Oncoplastic Breast Reconstruction Program, the Facial Nerve Program, the Lymphedema program, and the Continuum Cleft Palate and Craniofacial Center. He is a professor of Surgery at Icahn School of Medicine at Mount Sinai.

=== Publishing and media ===
Smith has published chapters and articles in numerous textbooks and medical journals, including Head and Neck, Plastic and Reconstructive Surgery, Laryngoscope, Operative Plastic Surgery, Pediatric Annals, Annals of Plastic Surgery, The Breast Journal, The Journal of Reconstructive Miscrosurgery, and Microsurgery.

In January 2008, he performed a live webcast for OR Live demonstrating breast reconstruction using the DIEP flasp for a patient undergoing bilateral nipple-sparing mastectomies.

In May 2009, he was profiled in a three-part documentary entitled A Change of Face, which aired on MSNBC-TV (episode 0427). The mini−series followed patients through the surgical treatment of facial disfigurements.

Smith has also been an invited medical expert on the CBS Early Show and CNN.
