= Sword of the Samurai (gamebook) =

1986 gamebook by Mark Smith and Jamie Thomson

- Cover of the original Puffin Books edition
- Authors: Mark Smith; Jamie Thomson
- Illustrator: Alan Langford
- Cover artist: Peter Andrew Jones
- Series: Fighting Fantasy: Puffin number: 20; Wizard number: 25
- Genre: Fantasy
- Published: 1986
- Media type: Print (Paperback)
- ISBN: 0-14-032087-3 (Puffin); ISBN 1-84046-732-0 (Wizard)

Sword of the Samurai is a single-player roleplaying gamebook written by Mark Smith and Jamie Thomson, illustrated by Alan Langford and originally published in 1986 by Puffin Books. It was later republished by Wizard Books in 2006. It forms part of Steve Jackson and Ian Livingstone's Fighting Fantasy series. It is the 20th in the series in the original Puffin series and 25th in the modern Wizard series.

== Rules ==
As with titles such as House of Hell and Appointment with F.E.A.R., Sword of the Samurai utilizes an additional game mechanic – in this instance "Honour Points", which are awarded to the player for aiding those in need and defeating foes. If the player's Honour score is reduced to zero, then they as the player automatically commit suicide (known as seppuku in medieval Japan). Gameplay includes another feature: as with Appointment with F.E.A.R., the player may choose which attributes (in this instance Skills) they wish to utilize, which in turn affects the outcome.

== Story ==
Set in the fictional continent Khul on the Fighting Fantasy world Titan, the game is a campaign: the player must travel to the Pit of Demons, helping others, defeating foes and acquiring allies, and then battle through the Pit for a final confrontation for the Dai-Katana.
