= Mark Smith (cricketer) =

Zimbabwean cricketer (born 1975)

Personal information
- Full name: Mark Stuart Smith
- Born: 4 December 1975 (age 50); Bulawayo, Rhodesia
- Batting: Right-handed
- Bowling: Right-arm medium

Domestic team information
- Years: Team
- 1994/95: Matabeleland

Career statistics
Competition	First-class
Matches	1
Runs scored	1
Batting average	–
100s/50s	–/–
Top score	1*
Balls bowled	–
Wickets	–
Bowling average	–
5 wickets in innings	–
10 wickets in match	–
Best bowling	–
Catches/stumpings	–/–
- Source: ESPNcricinfo, 20 October 2012

Mark Stuart Smith (born December 4, 1975) was a Zimbabwean cricketer. He was a right-handed batsman and a right-arm medium-pace bowler who played for Matabeleland. He was born in Bulawayo.

Smith made a single first-class appearance for the team, during the 1994-95 season, against Mashonaland Under-24s. Batting as a tailender, Smith finished not out in both innings of the match, scoring just one run in the two innings in which he played.
