= Tower of Despair =

1984 text adventure video game

- Front art of the Spectrum cassette inlay
- Developer: Games Workshop
- Publisher: Games Workshop
- Platforms: ZX Spectrum, Commodore 64
- Release: 1984

Tower of Despair is a video game published in 1984 by Games Workshop for the ZX Spectrum. A Commodore 64 version was also released.

== Plot ==
In a text-only adventure, Malnor the Demonlord of Darkness has returned to the Tower of Despair with the powerful and malicious Ring of Skulls.

== Reception ==
Roger Kean previewed Tower of Despair in Crash #9 (October 1984), saying it has "one of the most beautiful specially generated character sets yet seen on the Spectrum" noting that "the location descriptions and set pieces are atmospheric and designed to drag you screaming into the adventure".

Kevin Westbury reviewed Tower of Despair for White Dwarf #60, giving it an overall rating of 9 out of 10, and stated that "you will find yourself smiling knowingly when you finally get a particularly tricky section right – only to loose it again when you get stuck in the next bit! There's going to be a lot of sleep lost over this one!"

Home Computing Weekly described the game as "Different and challenging, though not perhaps an adventure for first timers."

Personal Computer Games remarked: "Tower of Despair is a gripping adventure, deserving a place in any fantasy fan's collection".
