= Warrior Kings: Battles =

2003 video game

- Developer: Black Cactus
- Publishers: EU: Empire Interactive; NA: Strategy First
- Platform: Microsoft Windows
- Release: EU: March 21, 2003; NA: September 30, 2003
- Genre: Real-time strategy
- Modes: Single-player, multiplayer

Warrior Kings: Battles is a real-time strategy video game developed by British studio Black Cactus and published by Empire Interactive in Europe and co-published with Strategy First in North America. It is a sequel to the 2002 game Warrior Kings and was released March 21, 2003 in Europe and September 30, 2003 in North America.

The story is set 100 years after the first Warrior Kings where the Empire of Orbis has fragmented into states of feuding warlords. Like its predecessor, gameplay focuses on the RTS elements of resource and base management and unit combat but also the alignment system where all players start in similar positions and develop into their own unique faction of choice, the prime being under the strict religious knighthood of the Imperial, occultism and demon worship of the Pagan or the logic and scientific innovations of the Renaissance, all supporting both historical and fantasy based unit design.

== Gameplay ==
Large scale battle at base walls.

Warrior Kings: Battle is a real-time strategy game meaning much of its gameplay is focused on gathering resources and training and management of units for combat against opposing players. There are three types of resources to harvest; food, materials and gold but are not available until they are dropped off at a village and then transported via cart to the main base or warehouse. The later two are gathered from the surrounding environments like forests and mines while food is grown and harvested from built farms with speed of growth depending on how fertile the land beneath it is. A proportion of the food delivered by farmers is removed when they deliver to a village or drop off point representing your fighting units' consumption of food. The proportion removed is reliant on how many farms you have working compared to number of food consuming units. While villages and other resource-based buildings can be built anywhere other than within the base's walls, most military and economy based structures can only be built there, with each added building expanding the walls. There is also a mana bar present on some special units (this is notably absent from all renaissance units) with the ability to use magic. Additionally, some special structures such as the empire cathedral and pagan temple have mana bars that can be refilled through prayer or sacrifice of units depending on the alignment.

There are seven broad classes that units may be classified by, these are: Light (mostly ranged), Heavy (melee), Cavalry, Siege, reconnaissance (scouts), demonic, and special. Though some units might be classed as "demonic" or "special", they all count as another type of unit as well. For example, a "gibbering hoard" is a daemon, but also counts as light infantry. All of these unit types are effective and vulnerable to the other classes such as demonic being weak to special and heavy cavalry being weak against heavy infantry head-on. These handicaps require use of terrain, unit formation, positioning, and modus of attack to be considered for units to overcome their inherent weakness'. Units are built at a base level but can be trained for better effectiveness both in battle through the use of attack dummies. Unlike most real time strategy games ranged units have a set amount of ammunition at their disposal that must be replenished by supply carts or certain buildings lest their rate of fire suffer. There are also naval units like attack ships and trade cogs built at a port by water yet can only be built and used in multiplayer games.

Along with the Campaign Mode, there are two modes for online multiplayer and offline single player. The first a basic Skirmish Mode where players fight in a standard game with set number of players and a chosen map and generals along with minor gameplay settings. The other is Valhalla Mode where instead of constructing bases and training armies, players pre-select a full army without any economic aspect of play with the goal being to captured strategic flags scattered throughout each map, requiring players to capture these to earn points with the highest point earner as the victor when the set amount of time finishes. Flags can be captured and recaptured multiple times along with respawning units as an option.

=== Alignment paths ===
Like its predecessor Warrior Kings, there is no default starting faction as each player starts as a default peasant like faction and through constructing certain buildings, the player forges their own path of alignment to receive unique units and buildings exclusive to each path along with a change of appearance for the main base. In the game there are three main alignments; Imperial, Pagan and Renaissance for players to take, each with differing unit design and strategies. The Imperial path is a hierarchy that firmly believes in "The One God", similar in the vein of medieval European Christianity and the Crusaders. They use heavily armoured knights, war elephants and strong fortifications, along with Priests and Inquisitors who pray at Cathedrals and other holy temples to perform "Acts of God" like reigning fire down against opposing troops are providing rain to help in food resource growth. Their signature unit is a great Archangel known as The Sword of God summoned through a built statue of him but however isn't controllable and rather seeks out nearest foes. The Pagan path is much the opposite of the Imperial, being a faction of nature worship, witchcraft and sacrifice. They use various demons and other creatures as their core unit and use the tactics of using larger groups of weaker units to overwhelm opponents. Like the Imperial they also have units capable of casting magic via mana in the form of Druids that can turn resource points into elemental beasts and succubus that can convert enemy units. The Pagan can also summon a signature unit being a large demon known as Abaddon summoned through burning and sacrificing people at a wicker man. The Renaissance path however lacks both signature units and use of mana. Instead theirs is a faction of science and human ingenuity, with heavy use of gunpowder with riflemen, cannons, mortars and some fictional siege weapons like a giant rocket launcher.

While there are three main alignments, the player can instead also choose one of two sub paths that are a hybrid of Imperial Renaissance and Pagan Renaissance that while lacking some of their notable units, gain other unique units of their own such as the Imperial Renaissance Dragoon cavalry and the Pagan Renaissance legion of undead.

== Campaign ==
The story is set 100 years after the events of Artos in the first Warrior Kings, where the ruling Empire of the world of Orbis has descended into anarchy with its 22 provinces under rule of feuding warlords disbanding altogether where the Lord Protector Duke Ignis Hagens has usurped the throne of the Empire at Liguriensis. The player takes the role of the lead General from the Angland province in hope of reuniting all the other provinces of the Empire and to dethrone the Lord Protector.

The campaign layout is like that of a Risk style game, where the world map is broken down into 22 smaller provinces with each to be captured and secured, highlighted blue upon completion. The province of Liguriensis is located roughly in the centre meaning that the player doesn't have to capture all other provinces before the final conflict however is not encouraged to do so due to the high difficulty of the final mission and so with each captured province comes a reward for later battles such as more starting resources and an advance in certain alignments. One or more generals, sometimes allied with and against you or even against each other, hold each province, each with their own unique character portrait and style of play including which alignment they usually choose and favoured unit type and strategy. As each general and their corresponding province map are conquered, both are unlocked for use in Skirmish and Valhalla mode.

When Liguriensis and the Lord Protector falls, unified provinces and any others the player didn't seize rally around under the new rule of the Empire, with the throne being given to the player.

== Development ==
Warrior Kings: Battles was first announced in September 2002, the same year the first Warrior Kings was released in. In numerous interviews by Black Cactus employees, it was revealed that Battles was to put greater emphasis on quality of the artificial intelligence to allow it to match and even at times surpass human players thus creating the feeling players are playing against human opponent, making the focus of the game more multiplayer based, such as AI probing defences and using both brute force and stealth when required rather than reported "cheating" or "over weakness" in the last game. Being more of a drastic update/remake of the last game than a fully-fledged sequel, the graphics engine was updated along with new units and features such as the Arch Druid unit and extended abilities. Valhalla and AI general editor mode were also new additions to take advantage of the improved AI. Due to the differences in the campaign being less about the plot, senior AI designer Mike West said this was because it would have meant simply "crowbarring" the plot in, and instead said it would be more like Civilization where the plot is seen to create itself.

The game was first released in Europe on March 21, 2003, along with a collector's edition that included artwork cards. In July that same year Empire Interactive later revealed it would co publish the game with Strategy First for the North American release, which would later be on September 30, 2003.

== Reception ==
Reviews
Publication	Score
GameSpot	6.2/10
PC Zone UK	85/100
IGN	7/10
Computer Gaming World	3.5/5
ActionTrip	74/100
PC Gamer	66/100

Upon release, Warrior Kings: Battles received a fair yet generally favourable reception with an average critic score of 74% at GameRankings. While many praised the game's unit design, presentation and depth, others criticised the slow-paced nature and frustration of certain micromanagement gameplay aspect, along with a number of technical issues.

ActionTrip praised the game's implementation of fantasy elements, "which improves the overall impression of the game" along with troop versatility being "one of the main qualities of this game as it does feature some highly innovative units." IGN stated that "Warrior Kings: Battles is the sort of game fans of the genre will sink their teeth into, as there is plenty of depth" while the some of traditional gameplay conventions make it lack "that spark which sets the classics apart from the also-rans."

PC Zone UK said the game "never fails to surprise you, throwing up some new challenge or nuance just when you think you've mastered it" and features a "superb 3D engine [that] throws out beautiful landscapes all over your monitor, like an artist crafting on a canvas". However they did criticise the single player campaign being "straightforward, and sadly far less varied and compelling" than the previous installment. PC Gamer also felt similar, being more of "a series of missions with no cohesion other than the fact that they all lead toward your final objective." GameSpot felt that while the "underlying design is solid", there certain issues that brought it down, notably being camera control and pathfinding issues that given the game's focus on micromanagement makes it "an exercise in futility", concluding that there's "a lot of value out of the box, but whether you'll feel compelled to slog through all of it is another question."
