= Appointment with F.E.A.R. =

Fighting Fantasy book

- The original Puffin Books cover
- Author: Steve Jackson
- Illustrator: Declan Considine
- Cover artist: Brian Bolland
- Series: Fighting Fantasy: Puffin number: 17; Wizard number: 18
- Genre: Fantasy; Location: Titan City, Earth
- Publication date: Puffin: 1985; Wizard: 2004
- Media type: Print (Paperback)
- ISBN: 0-14-031922-0 (Puffin); ISBN 1-84046-527-1 (Wizard)

Appointment with F.E.A.R. is a single-player roleplaying gamebook written by Steve Jackson, illustrated by Declan Considine and originally published in 1985 by Puffin Books. It was later republished by Wizard Books in 2004. It forms part of Steve Jackson and Ian Livingstone's Fighting Fantasy series. It is the 17th in the series in the original Puffin series (ISBN 0-14-031922-0) and 18th in the modern Wizard series (ISBN 1-84046-527-1). A digital version developed by Tin Man Games is available for Android and iOS.

== Rules ==
As with titles such as House of Hell and Sword of the Samurai, Appointment with F.E.A.R. utilizes an additional game mechanic—in this instance "Hero Points", which are awarded to the player for every villain captured and disaster averted. Gameplay includes two other features: the player may choose which super-powers they wish to utilize (which in turn affects the outcome); and the player must also collect clues which will allow the hero to catch criminals and ultimately learn the location of a meeting of evil masterminds. Unlike other titles, the story features 440 references as opposed to the typical 400.

== Story ==
The reader assumes the role of Jean Lafayette, secretly the Silver Crusader, a superhero who protects the fictional Titan City. The reader chooses from four super-powers (strength and flight, gadgets, psychic powers or energy blasts) and battles criminals and more prominently campy supervillains such as the Scarlet Prankster, Dr. Macabre, the Serpent and the Alchemists. In addition to catching criminals, the reader's ultimate goal is to determine the time and place of the imminent meeting between the leaders of evil organization F.E.A.R. (the Federation of Euro-American Rebels) and capture their leader Vladimir Utoshiki, the "Titanium Cyborg".

== Reception ==
Fantasy Book Review stated "In a change from the traditional sword and sorcery based FF books, this sci-fi romp has dispensed with Gold Pieces, Potions and Items and replaced them with Hero Points and Clues...While this is not the best FF book that Steve Jackson ever wrote it is an excellent gamebook..."

== In other media ==
- A digital version developed by Tin Man Games is available for Android and iOS.

== Sequel ==
A sequel was published in issue 12 of Warlock, the Fighting Fantasy magazine, in 1986. "Deadline to Destruction" was written by Gavin Shute, illustrated by David Stevens, and was 200 paragraphs long.
