= Mark Landon Smith =

American playwright and actor (born 1964)

Mark Landon Smith (born January 29, 1964) is an American playwright and actor. Known as a comedy writer, with 18 scripts published by Stage Rights, Drama Source and Contemporary Drama Service, Pioneer Publishing, Concord Theatricals and includes three foreign translations, an Off-Broadway production, a film adaptation and numerous productions throughout the world annually.

As actor he has appeared on stage, film and television. Film credits include Killers of the Flower Moone, Glass Cages, Good Gorgeous Hell, The Tickle Monster, A World Full of Loneliness, Gordon Family Tree, Valley Inn, Parker's Anchor, Door in the Woods, The Play, Hazardous Duty, F.R.E.D.I., Wasted Time, Wildfire, Indian Territory, Life of Crime, Mindcage. He served a producer for the films Dupont, Mississippi, Parker's Anchor, Door in the Woods, The Man in the Trunk, Sweet Inspirations, Wonderland Cave, Uniball,

He is the executive director of ARTS LIVE THEATRE, Co-founder/Co-Producer of Ceramic Cow Productions and co-director, emcee and actor with Phunbags Comedy Improv. He is also the Founder and co-director of the Actor's Casting Agency and Smith|Fox casting, and runs the Playwright's Workshop for TheatreSquared.

He received the Arkansas Governor's Award for the Arts, was featured on PBS and has appeared in regional theatres receiving nominations and wins for Best Actor, Best Supporting Actor, Best Featured Actor, Best Set Design and Best Choreography. His script Christmas Carol High School'' is a 2012 AATE Distinguished Play Award nominee.

== Plays ==
- Faith County
- Faith County 2
- The Really Hip Adventures of Go-Go Girl
- A Dickens of a Christmas Carol
- Hindenberg, Das Explosive New Musical
- Radio TBS
- Dupont, Mississippi
- The Pirate Show
- Christmas Carol High School
- Teenagers From Outer Space
- Plan 9 From Outer Space
- Brawl at the Ball
- Night of the Living Dead

Santa Claus Conquers the Martians" "Alice In Cyberland" "Sherlock Holmes High School" "Alice Done the Rabbit Hole" "Plan 9 From Outer Space"
