= Way of the Tiger =

Series of adventure gamebooks

- "Way of the Tiger 1: Avenger!" Bookcover
- Language: English
- Release number: 0 - 7
- Genre: Gamebooks
- Publisher: Knight books
- Publication date: 1985
- Preceded by: Ninja! (2013), Avengeer! (1985), Assassin! (1985), Usurper! (1985)
- Followed by: Overlord (1986), Warbringer! (1986), Inferno! (1987), Redeemer! (2015)

The Way of the Tiger is a series of adventure gamebooks by Mark Smith and Jamie Thomson, originally published by Knight Books (an imprint of Hodder & Stoughton) from 1985. They are set on the fantasy world of Orb. The reader takes the part of a young monk/ninja, named Avenger, initially on a quest to avenge his foster father's murder and recover stolen scrolls. Later books presented other challenges for Avenger to overcome, most notably taking over and ruling a city.

The world of Orb was originally created by Mark Smith for a Dungeons & Dragons game he ran while a pupil at Brighton College in the mid-1970s. Orb was also used as the setting for the 1984 Fighting Fantasy gamebook Talisman of Death, and one of the settings in the 1985 Falcon gamebook Lost in Time, both by Smith and Thomson.

The sixth book, Inferno!, ends on a cliffhanger with Avenger trapped in the web of the Black Widow, Orb's darkest blight. As no new books were released, the fate of Avenger and Orb was unknown. Mark Smith has confirmed that the cliffhanger ending was deliberate.

In August 2013, the original creators of the series were working with Megara Entertainment to develop re-edited hardcover collector editions of the gamebooks (including a new prequel (Book 0) and sequel (book 7)), and potentially a role-playing game based on the series. The two new books plus the six re-edited original books were reprinted in paperback format by Megara Entertainment in 2014, and made available as PDFs in 2019.

== Books and publication history ==
The original series comprises six books:

- Avenger! (1985)
- Assassin! (1985)
- Usurper! (1985)
- Overlord! (1986)
- Warbringer! (1986)
- Inferno! (1987)

The sixth book ended on a cliffhanger, which was not resolved until 27 years later. Interviewed in 2012, Mark Smith explained: "Our publishers Hodder and Stoughton originally had signed for seven books but they cancelled the last in a fit of pique, which is why Inferno! ends so unsatisfactorily – they re-wrote the end themselves to kill the series. The story here is that the then CEO of Hodder, Eddie Bell, left to become CEO of Harper Collins ... He took us with him so that we could write the DuelMaster series for Harper Collins and Hodder revoked the contract for Book #7 in revenge. They said it was for commercial reasons, but the series was still successful and reprinting."

Ninja! (a prequel by David Walters) and Redeemer! (by all three writers) were added in 2014.

The books could be played in sequence or as standalone adventures, although playing them in sequence preserves the continuity of the storyline. If played in sequence, any abilities, bonuses, penalties or special items Avenger had acquired carried over to the next book.

== Publications in other languages ==
The original 6 books were published in French (La Voie du tigre) and Italian (Ninja), and partly in Spanish (La Senda del tigre), Swedish (Tigerns väg) and in Bulgarian (Пътят на тигъра, Patyat na tigara). In Japanese only the first book was published as "Taiga no ansatsukyo".

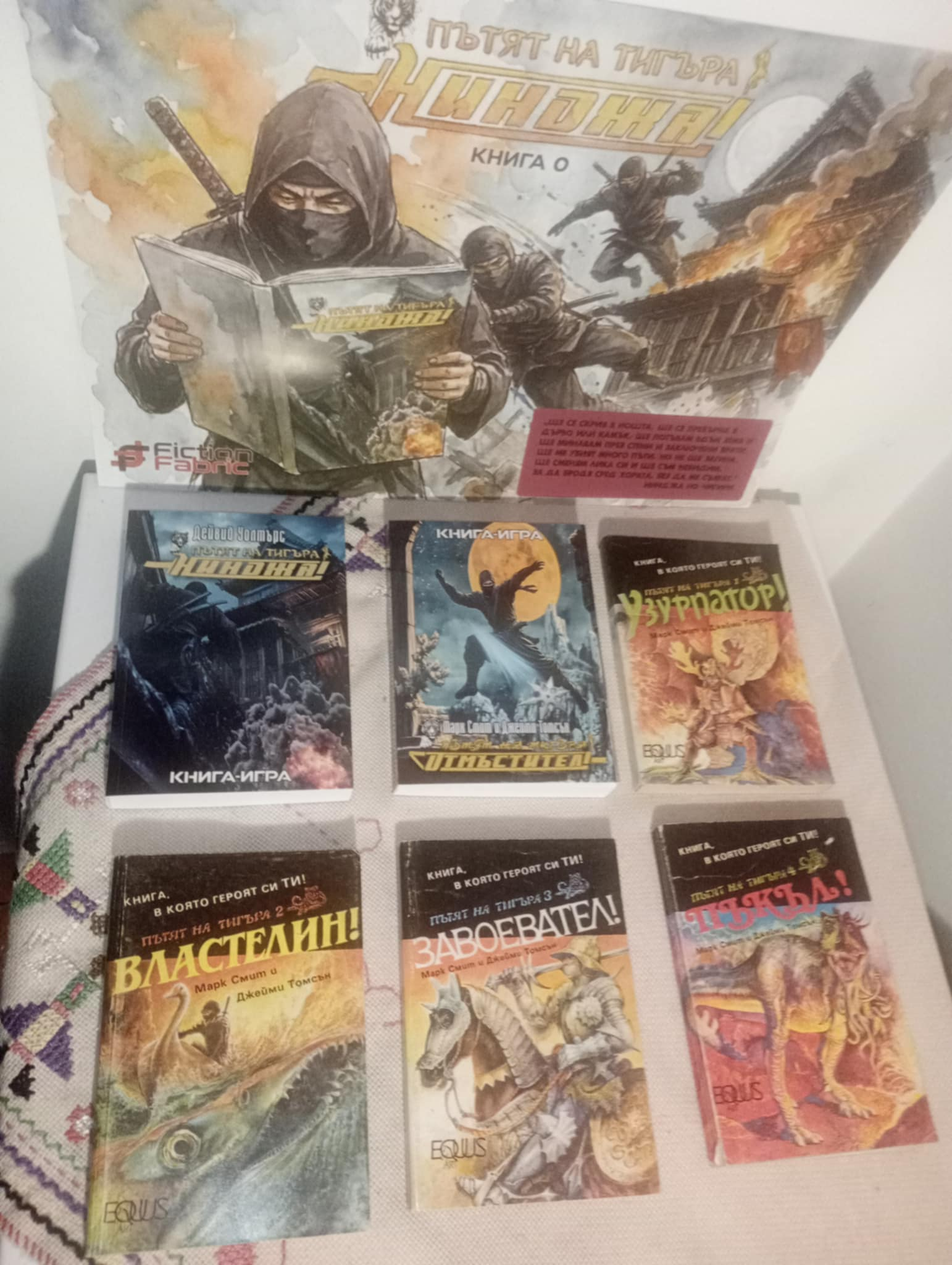
Way of the Tiger in Bulgarian

Title	English	French	Swedish	Italian	Spanish	Bulgarian
0. "Ninja!"	Megara, 2014	-	-	-	-	Fiction Fabric, 2025
1. "Avenger!"	Knight Books, TRAFALGAR SQUARE+, 1985; Barkley/Pacer, 1988; Fabled Lands, 2014, Shinobi 27, 2025	Gallimard, 1987	Äventyrsspel, 1988	EL, 1991	Libro Juego, 1988	Fiction Fabric, 2026
2. "Assassin!"	Knight Books, TRAFALGAR SQUARE+, 1985; Barkley/Pacer, 1988; Fabled Lands, 2014, Shinobi 27, 2025	Gallimard, 1987	Äventyrsspel, 1988	EL, 1991	Libro Juego, 1988	-
3. "Usurper!"	Knight Books, TRAFALGAR SQUARE+, 1985; Barkley/Pacer, 1988; Fabled Lands, 2014, Shinobi 27, 2025	Gallimard, 1987	Äventyrsspel, 1988	EL, 1992	Libro Juego, 1988	Еквус Арт, 1992
4. "Overlord!"	Knight Books, TRAFALGAR SQUARE+, 1986; Barkley/Pacer, 1988; Fabled Lands, 2014, -	Folio Junior, 1987	Äventyrsspel, 1988	EL, 1992	Libro Juego, 1988	Еквус Арт, 1993
5. "Warbringer!"	Knight Books, TRAFALGAR SQUARE+, 1986; Barkley/Pacer, 1988; Fabled Lands, 2014, -	Folio Junior, 1987	Äventyrsspel, 1988	EL, 1992	-	Еквус Арт, 1993
6. "Inferno!"	Knight Books, TRAFALGAR SQUARE+, 1987; Barkley/Pacer, 1988; Fabled Lands, 2014, -	Folio Junior, 1988	-	EL, 1992	-	Еквус Арт, 1993
7. "Redeemer!"	Megara, 2015	-	-	-	-	-

== Features ==
The series featured a combat system based on unarmed fighting moves with colourful names, such as the Cobra Strike punch, or Leaping Tiger kick. Avenger could also choose from a list of ninja skills such as Acrobatics or Poison Needle spitting, and used a variety of appropriate weaponry, such as a garotte and shuriken. Luck also played in part in the form of Fate tests to see if Fate smiled on you, or turned her back. Avenger could also enhance his skill by using "Inner Force", similar to qi energy.

During the series Avenger could learn new skills, such as "Shinren," a means of understanding people's intentions by observing subtle clues.

== Video games ==
Two video games based on the books were released. The first, The Way of the Tiger, is a beat 'em up released by Gremlin Graphics for the Amstrad CPC, ZX Spectrum, MSX, Commodore 16 and Commodore 64. This game has Avenger fighting with staves and swords as well as utilizing unarmed combat (Avenger rarely used weapons apart from shuriken in the books).

Way of the Tiger II: Avenger is an action-adventure made by Gremlin Graphics in 1986, for the computers Commodore 64, Amstrad CPC, ZX Spectrum and MSX. In the game's story, Yaemon the Grand Master of Flame has killed the player's foster-father Naijish and stolen the Scrolls of Kettsuin. To recover the scrolls, the player has to find enough keys to penetrate the Quench Heart Keep, and then kill each of the three guards. The game is viewed from top-down perspective and superficially resembles Gauntlet.

== Reception ==
Chris Elliott reviewed Assassin! and Avenger!' for White Dwarf #71, giving it an overall rating of 8 out of 10, and stated that "Plot and atmosphere may be a bit 'Kung Fu meets AD&D', but both add a few new twists to the adventure gamebook formula, and deserve credit for that. Overall, good entertainment value."

In the inaugural issue of The Games Machine, John Woods noted that "the great appeal of these books is the detailed unarmed combat system. The rules have illustrations of the great variety of kicks, punches and throws available, and the player selects the best move to use against each opponent."

== See also ==
- Choose Your Own Adventure
- Fighting Fantasy, Advanced Fighting Fantasy
- Lone Wolf
