= Mark Smith (author) =

British fantasy author

Mark Smith is the author of several fantasy gamebooks.

== Background ==
Smith is of Czech-Hungarian/English descent and was born in Birmingham. He was educated in Brighton and went on to gain an MA in Experimental Psychology from Oxford University. He also spent some time racing in Formula Renault.

== Career ==
Mark Smith is an author of gamebooks, including co-authoring two Fighting Fantasy titles (Talisman of Death and Sword of the Samurai), and the series Duel Master, Falcon and Way of the Tiger (1985-1987), all of which he co-authored with Jamie Thomson, whom he met whilst at school in Brighton.

Today, Smith remains in southeast England, having been made insolvent by HMRC in December 2020.

== List of works ==
- Fighting Fantasy #11: Talisman of Death
- Fighting Fantasy #20: Sword of the Samurai
- Falcon
  - The Renegade Lord
  - Mechanon
  - The Rack of Baal
  - Lost in Time
  - The Dying Sun
  - At the End of Time
- The Way of the Tiger
  - Avenger!
  - Assassin!
  - Usurper!
  - Overlord!
  - Warbringer!
  - Inferno!
- Duel Master
  - Challenge of the Magi
  - Blood Valley
  - The Shattered Realm
  - Arena of Death
- Virtual Reality #1: Green Blood
- Virtual Reality #3: The Coils of Hate
