= Marc Smith (palaeographer) =

French historian and palaeographer (born 1963)

- Born: Marc Pascal Hamilton Smith; 25 July 1963 (age 62); Newcastle upon Tyne
- Occupations: Historian; Palaeographer

Marc H. Smith (born 25 July 1963) is a French historian and palaeographer. Born in Newcastle upon Tyne in England, he has both French and British citizenship.

== Education ==
Marc Smith obtained his archivist palaeographer degree as major (valedictorian) of the 1988 class of the École Nationale des Chartes with a thesis entitled La France et sa civilisation vues par les Italiens au XVIe, then started his career as curator at the Archives nationales (1988–1994).

=== Career ===
A former member of the École française de Rome (1990–1993), doctor of the École pratique des hautes études with a thesis on Les Italiens à la découverte de la France au XVIe : géographie, voyages et représentations de l'espace (1993), he was general secretary of the École nationale des chartes (1995–1998), and since professor of medieval and modern palaeography. In 2013, he was also elected director of studies at the Ecole Pratique des Hautes Etudes, section of Historical and Philological Sciences (chair of Palaeography and history of writing in Latin characters). He also taught at the University Paris-Sorbonne (1998–2000), the Columbia University of New York (2014–2016), and head of the Mellon Summer Institute in Vernacular Paleography (Center for Renaissance Studies, Newberry Library, Chicago, et Getty Research Institute, Los Angeles) for French palaeography (since 2008).

Former president of the International Committee for Latin Palaeography (2015-2025), he is a member of the Hebrew paleography Committee, former secretary (2002-2011) and former president (2014) of the Société de l'histoire de France, co-editor of the series Monumenta Palaeographica Medii Aevi (Brepols; with Jean-Pierre Mahé and Élisabeth Lalou), member of the editorial boards of Scriptorium, Gazette du livre médiéval, and the Ménestrel portal, member of the reading committee of Scrineum Rivista, and former editor of the Bibliothèque de l'École des chartes journal.

=== Work ===
His research mainly concern the evolution of the Latin alphabet in its long term linguistic, technical, cognitive and cultural situations, from Roman inscriptions to digital typography. He contributed to the expertise of many manuscripts and other objects listed in public and private collections, and the restoration of the château du Bois-Orcan in Noyal-sur-Vilaine (registration of the chapel, 2008). He is preparing a catalog of calligraphic collections published by French master writers up to 1815, preserved in European and American collections.

== Books ==
- Sous la dir. d'Alexandre Labat (1994). Expositions universelles, internationales et nationales au XIXe;répertoire numérique détaillé sélectif des articles de la sous-série F12 relatifs aux expositions, an VI-1914: état provisoire. Paris: Archives nationales.
- Dir. with Yves-Marie Bercé and Olivier Guyotjeannin (1997). L'École nationale des chartes;histoire de l'école depuis 1821. Thionville: Klopp. ISBN 2-911992-05-9.
- Dir. with Marie-Clotilde Hubert and Emmanuel Poulle (2000). Le Statut du scripteur au Moyen Âge;actes du XIIe colloque scientifique du Comité international de paléographie latine, Cluny, 17-20 July 1998. Matériaux pour l'Histoire. Paris: École nationale des chartes. ISBN 2-900791-35-9.
- Avec Laura Light, Script, New York, Les Enluminures, series "Primer" (n° 9), 39 p. (ISBN 978-0-9915172-9-9, SUDOC 193836718)

=== Scientific editions ===
- Étienne Vitelli (2005). Commentaires sur la guerre civile de France;de la surprise de Meaux à la bataille de Saint-Denis (1567). Études et rencontres de l'École des chartes. Paris: École nationale des chartes. ISBN 2-900791-52-9.

== Articles ==
- "Lyon vu par les voyageurs italiens au XVIe". Beaujeu et sa région : histoire du département du Rhône : actes des Journées d'études 1988. Lyon: Union des sociétés historiques du Rhône. 1990. pp. 85–98. ISBN 2-906998-03-6.
- Pierre Legendre (1988). "Les lettres de Pierre Damien et la décrétale d'Alexandre II". Le Dossier occidental de la parenté : textes juridiques indésirables sur la généalogie. Paris: Fayard. pp. 125–187. ISBN 2-213-02050-7.
- Michèle Bimbenet-Privat; et al. (1995). "Clients italiens des orfèvres de Paris sous les derniers Valois". L'Orfèvrerie parisienne de la Renaissance : trésors dispersés. Paris: centre culturel du Panthéon. pp. 209–221. ISBN 2-9504070-8-0.
- Yves-Marie Bercé; Elena Fasano Guarini; et al. (1996). "Complots, révoltes et tempéraments nationaux: Français et Italiens au XVIe". Complots et conjurations dans l'Europe moderne : actes du colloque international, Rome, 30 September-2 October 1993. Collection de l'École française de Rome. Rome-Paris: École française de Rome-De Boccard. pp. 93–115. ISBN 2-7283-0362-2.
- Christian Desplat; Paul Mironneau; et al. (1997). "Ordre et désordres dans quelques entrées de légats à la fin du XVIe". Les Entrées : gloire et déclin d'un cérémonial : colloque des 10 et 11 mai 1996, château de Pau. Biarritz: société Henri-IV. pp. 65–91. ISBN 2-84127-119-6.
- Jean Balsamo; et al. (1998). "Voyageurs italiens en France au début du règne de François Ier". Passer les monts : Français en Italie, l'Italie en France (1494-1525) : Xe colloque de la Société française d'étude du seizième siècle. Bibliothèque Franco-Simone. Paris-Fiesole: Champion-Cadmo. pp. 297–312. ISBN 2-85203-797-1.
- Dominique de Courcelles; et al. (1998). "Points de vue et images du monde: anamorphoses de textes géographiques, de Strabon à Giovanni Botero". Traduire et adapter à la Renaissance : actes de la journée d'étude, Paris, 11 April 1996. Études et rencontres de l'École des chartes. Paris: École nationale des chartes. pp. 123–142. ISBN 2-900791-26-X.
- Danielle Boillet; Marie-Françoise Piéjus; et al. (2001). "Émulation guerrière et stéréotypes nationaux dans les guerres d'Italie". Les Guerres d'Italie (1494-1559) : histoire, pratiques, représentations : actes du colloque international, Paris, 9–11 December 1999. Centre interuniversitaire de recherche sur la Renaissance italienne. Paris: université Paris-3-Sorbonne-Nouvelle. pp. 155–176. ISBN 2-900478-24-3.
- Bernard Beck; Pierre Bouet; Claire Étienne; Isabelle Lettéron; et al. (2003). "Rouen-Gaillon: témoignages italiens sur la Normandie de Georges d'Amboise". L'Architecture de la Renaissance en Normandie : colloque, Cerisy-la-Salle, 1998. Vol. I. Caen: Presses universitaires de Caen. pp. 41–58. ISBN 2-84133-194-6.
- Gilles Bertrand; et al. (2004). "Écritures et lectures italiennes de l'espace français au XVIe". La Culture du voyage : pratiques et discours de la Renaissance à l'aube du XXe. Logiques historiques. Paris-Budapest-Turin: L'Harmattan. pp. 21–50. ISBN 2-7475-6997-7.
- Otto Kresten; Franz Lackner; et al. (2008). "L'écriture de la chancellerie de France au XIVe: observations sur ses origines et sa diffusion en Europe". Régionalisme et internationalisme : problèmes de paléographie et de codicologie du Moyen Âge : actes du XVe colloque du Comité international de paléographie latine, Vienne, 13-17 Septembre 2005. Denkschriften-Österreichische Akademie der Wissenschaften, Philosophisch-historische Klasse. Vienna: Verlag der Österreichischen Akademie der Wissenschaften. pp. 279–298. ISBN 978-3-7001-3824-2.
- Philippe Contamine; Laurent Vissière; et al. (2011). Les Chartriers seigneuriaux, XIII - XXIe; défendre ses droits, construire sa mémoire: actes du colloque international de Thouars, 8–10 June 2006. Paris: Société de l'histoire de France. pp. 223–246. ISBN 978-2-35407-131-8.
- Christine Ducourtieux; Jean-Philippe Genet; Andrea Zorzi; et al. (2011). "L'expérience de Ménestrel: douze ans dans l'internet médiéval". Les Historiens et l'Informatique : un métier à réinventer. Collection de l'École française de Rome. Rome-Paris: École française de Rome-De Boccard. pp. 141–156. ISBN 978-2-7283-0904-7.
