= List of Lone Wolf media =

The following is a list of media published in the Lone Wolf series of gamebooks, and other derivative media based on the gamebooks. The original gamebook series, and the bulk of subsequent Lone Wolf media, was written by Joe Dever. The success and cult status of the original gamebooks helped in the creation of a spin-off called The World of Lone Wolf, written by Ian Page, a series of novelizations, a collection of role-playing games, other gamebooks set in the same universe, a number of video games and other derivative works.

== Printed media ==
=== Main gamebook series ===
Although they form one full series numbered 1 to 32, the Lone Wolf gamebooks are in fact subdivided into four subseries. In the Kai series (books 1 to 5), we follow Lone Wolf as he climbs the steps to become a Kai Lord of the Magnakai level. In the Magnakai series (books 6 to 12), Lone Wolf collects the Lorestones so he can reach the Grand Master level, the highest level a Kai Lord could achieve in the First Kai Order. In the Grand Master series (books 13 to 20), Lone Wolf discovers that there are even higher levels a Kai Lord could achieve, up to the point of Supreme Kai Master. In the New Order series (books 21 to 32), we play as a member of the Second Kai Order already at the level of a Grand Master. The yet to be published book 32 will belong to this subseries.

==== Kai series ====
Name	Release date
Flight from the Dark	1984 (2007 for the Extended version)
At the Kai Monastery is a young initiate, given the name Silent Wolf. On the feastday of Fehmarn, when all the Kai Lords gather at the monastery, Silent Wolf is sent to cut wood from the surrounding forest as a punishment for his inattention in class. While he is gone, a surprise attack is launched from the Darklands at several places across Sommerlund. The Monastery is assaulted and the gathered Kai Lords massacred. Returning from the woods to find himself the only survivor, Silent Wolf renames himself Lone Wolf and sets out for the capital to inform the King of the loss of the Kai. According to sales figures, this first book sold over 100,000 copies in its first month of publication alone. Mongoose Publishing has republished this gamebook in the summer of 2007, featuring new internal artwork by Richard Longmore, with the story being an extended director's cut version extensively rewritten by Joe Dever. Among other changes in this new version, instead of being sent outside the Monastery to gather wood, Silent Wolf is punished by being summoned for a special training session with his master one early morning. Silent Wolf is then present at the Monastery during the attack of the Darklords and plays an important part in it. A homebrew version of the book with rich graphics and sound has been released, it is playable on the Nintendo DS with a flashcard.
Fire on the Water	1984
Having informed the King of Sommerlund about the fate of the Kai Order, Lone Wolf is instructed to make a journey to their ally and neighbor country of Durenor to retrieve the legendary Sommerswerd, which is Sommerlund's only hope at repelling Darklord Zagarna's massive invasion. The book was illustrated by Gary Chalk. The introduction of the Sommerswerd and its awesome power within the subsequent books made some fans question whether Joe Dever's intention of making every book accomplishable on its own still realistic. The plot and story of this book was generally greeted favorably by readers, although the "Tunnel to Hammerdal Chokepoint" (along with some accompanying errata in some editions) detracted from the enjoyment of some. The book was awarded Gamebook of the Year 1986. A homebrew version of the book with rich graphics and sound has been released, it is playable on the Nintendo DS with a flashcard.
The Caverns of Kalte	1984
After the invasion force of Archlord Zagarna was destroyed, Vonotar, the Sommlending mage who betrayed his country, escaped to the icy arctic region of Kalte. Lone Wolf is appointed by the king to seek him out and bring him to justice. This book ends with Lone Wolf battling a giant undead monster, and defeating Vonotar with the help of the freed magician Loi-Kymar. If the reader is unable to defeat Vonotar quickly enough, an alternative ending occurs where Loi-Kymar is slain in mental combat with Vonotar. In this ending, Vonotar escapes, Loi-Kymar's secrets die with him, and the player returns to the ship to regretfully inform his shipmates that his mission has failed. It is the only time in any Lone Wolf book where the story ends without a victory or Lone Wolf's death.
The Chasm of Doom	1985
In this book, Lone Wolf is charged by the King of Sommerlund to investigate the disappearance of a troop of cavalry. The cavalry, led by a man named Captain D'Val, themselves disappeared under mysterious circumstances while investigating a disruption in the flow of mined resources from the province of Ruanon. Lone Wolf, along with the fifty Sommlending soldiers who accompany him, must uncover the truth surrounding the missing men and stop the rebirth of an ancient evil.
Shadow on the Sand	1985
Once more, Lone Wolf must set out on a mission bestowed upon him by the king. This time however, the mission is a diplomatic one, in which a crucial peace treaty must be signed in the far away desert empire of Vassagonia. But as always, things are more complex than they seem, and peace is elusive. Lone Wolf walks into a trap from which he barely escapes, and must face foul enemies, reunite with old friends and do battle with the prime Darklord, Haakon, to regain a secret artifact which will determine the fate of the Kai Order: the Book of the Magnakai. At the time of its publication, this adventure was the only one to not feature 350 sections, having 400 instead. During the initial run of the series, only another book, The Hunger of Sejanoz (book 28), would not feature the traditional 350 sections, being shortened to 300 by the publisher.

==== Magnakai series ====
Name	Release date
The Kingdoms of Terror	1985
In order to fulfill his pledge to restore the Kai, Lone Wolf must first himself become a Kai Grand Master. To accomplish this monumental task, he must retrieve the Lorestones led only by the wisdom of Sun Eagle, the first Kai Grand Master. As the last of the Kai, there is little to guide Lone Wolf in his studies, except for a faded inscription in the Book of the Magnakai directing him to seek the Lorestone of Varetta. And so, Lone Wolf sets off for Varetta in the Stornlands, far to the south of Sommerlund, to find this ancient relic and revive the glory of the Kai.
Castle Death	1986
In his quest to attain Kai Grand Master status, Lone Wolf must seek out and find 7 Lorestones. After obtaining the Lorestone of Varetta in the previous book and absorbing its wisdom and power, the location of the next Lorestone is revealed as the remote township of Herdos. Here, Lone Wolf is directed by friendly Elder Magi to search within the accursed fortress of Kazan-Oud, otherwise known as "Castle Death". There he is forced to face harrowing traps, and the ancient enemies of the Magicians of Dessi in order to retrieve the second Lorestone and secure the future of his people.
The Jungle of Horrors	1986
After surviving the perils of Castle Death and being tutored by the Elder Magi, Lone Wolf must now seek out the third Lorestone and recover further lost secrets of the Magnakai. The location of this Lorestone is thought to be hidden in a temple deep within a jungle-swamp known as the Danarg. Over the years, this fetid swamp has become the home for any number of evil creatures who seek to protect the jungle and its treasures. To make matters worse, news is delivered that the Darklords have united behind a new leader, and may soon again bring war to Magnamund, enhancing the urgency of Lone Wolf's quest.
The Cauldron of Fear	1987
As Lone Wolf races to recover the remaining Lorestones, he learns that the next one resides deep underground, beneath the streets of the city of Tahou. Unfortunately, the war against the Darklords has not been going well, and Tahou is now in danger of falling before Lone Wolf even reaches it. If it falls before the Lorestone is recovered, all of Magnamund may be doomed. Lone Wolf must travel into the heart of danger, avoid the armies of the Darklords and find his way into Tahou without his enemies learning of his quest.
The Dungeons of Torgar	1987
After discovering that the three remaining Lorestones have fallen into the hands of the Darklords, Lone Wolf and his allies must formulate a daring plan to recover them. It is rumored that the stones are in the dark Drakkarim city of Torgar, where evil sorcerers search for a means to destroy the stones. Once more, Lone Wolf must make haste in an attempt to recover the Lorestones before their destruction, plunging into the very heart of darkness and a trap that threatens to banish him from Magnamund for all time.
The Prisoners of Time	1987
Although Lone Wolf is successful in rescuing one of the captive Lorestones from Torgar, both he and the remaining two Lorestones are blasted through a portal by Darklord Gnaag. After plummeting through the Shadow Gate, Lone Wolf finds himself trapped on the Daziarn Plane and must join strange allies and face old enemies if he hopes to make his way out of the Daziarn in time to save his homeland from destruction at the hands of the Darklords.
The Masters of Darkness	1988
After his struggles in the plane of Daziarn, Lone Wolf finally recovers the last of the Lorestones and finds a Shadow Gate back to his home. Unfortunately, upon his return, he finds that considerable time has passed and that, in his absence, the Darklords have conquered much of Magnamund. Now with all of the Lorestones wisdom absorbed within him, and the hopes of Sommerlund and all the free peoples of Magnamund on his shoulders, Lone Wolf must travel into the very depths of Helgedad, confront Gnaag himself and struggle to stop the raging Darklord menace once and for all.

==== Grand Master series ====
Name	Release date
The Plague Lords of Ruel	1990
After the events of the previous series of books, Lone Wolf has taken up training new Kai recruits, and under his tutelage, the Kai have been re-founded. Even though peace reigns for the moment, chaos is once again poised to unfold, as a group of Cenerese druids plot to unleash a massive plague upon all of Magnamund. The Elder Magi enlist the aid of Lone Wolf to find the source of this plague and destroy it before it can be released.
The Captives of Kaag	1991
Three months after the events of The Plague Lords of Ruel, Lone Wolf learns that his friend, Guildmaster Banedon, has been abducted by a band of Giaks under the command of Nadziranim sorcerers. It is suspected that they are planning to torture him to extract magical techniques which can be united with their own dark sorcery. Lone Wolf and the reader must venture to Kaag, where Banedon is held, and attempt a rescue before he meets his demise, or worse, yields the coveted magical secrets of left-handed magic.
The Darke Crusade	1991
Once more, Lone Wolf's help is sought by a monarch, this time, King Sarnac of Lencia. While battling the Drakkarim under control of Magnaarn, the High Warlord of Darke, the Lencians have discovered that Magnaarn seeks an ancient artifact, the Doomstone of Darke. It is feared that he is close to discovering this artifact, and with it, the power to rally the Nadziaranim sorcerers and other Darklord allies against Lencia. Lone Wolf and the reader take up the cause of Lencia to stop the forces of evil from recovering the Doomstone of Darke, in order to thwart Magnaarn's aims.
The Legacy of Vashna	1991
Long ago, Vashna, the greatest of all Darklords, was defeated in battle by King Ulnar of Sommerlund. But the victory was not complete, for while his body was destroyed, his spirit, as well as the spirits of his troops, remain trapped deep within the Maakengorge. Now, Lone Wolf learns of strange sightings in the area near the Maakengorge, suggesting that there may be a plot afoot to resurrect Vashna. Lone Wolf and the reader set out to uncover the nature of the threat, and to see if, indeed, Vashna will return.
The Deathlord of Ixia	1992
Following the events of The Legacy of Vashna, the Deathstaff, the artefact which was to be used in the Darklord's resurrection, resurfaces in the icy realm of Ixia to the very west of the Darklands. Lone Wolf must travel into this harsh land, frozen in time and ice by a dread curse, and destroy the demonic lord who has gained possession of the staff.
Dawn of the Dragons	1992
Just before Lone Wolf has had time to recover from his most recent mission, dire news reach him: the New Order of the Kai is once again besieged by Naar's dark forces. Lone Wolf must race back to Sommerlund, chased by assassins and treacherous agents of the Dark God, to help his apprentices in the time of their greatest test.
Wolf's Bane	1993
An evil doppelganger of Lone Wolf appears in Sommerlund and wreaks havoc among its helpless people, challenging Lone Wolf to a duel, which is to take place in a high-tech world long consigned to Naar. It is there that Lone Wolf learns about the whereabouts of the most significant artefact of his world's history: the fabulous Moonstone of the Shianti.
The Curse of Naar	1993
Once again, Lone Wolf must journey to the Plane of Darkness to snatch the Moonstone from Naar before the Dark God can harness its untold powers even further for his nefarious schemes. With only a fell tome and his skills to help him, Lone Wolf embarks on perhaps the most hazardous mission he has ever undertaken ...

==== New Order series ====
Name	Release date
Voyage of the Moonstone	1994
The Moonstone is a legendary artefact that was created by the godlike Shianti. It contains the might of all their magic and wisdom, the sum of their divine knowledge. Lone Wolf – Supreme Master of the Kai – has succeeded in retrieving it from the clutches of Naar, the King of the Darkness. Now the Moonstone must be returned to its creators who are exiled upon the remote Isle of Lorn in southern Magnamund. Someone must take the fabled artefact to the Shianti and Lone Wolf has chosen you, the most promising warrior, among the ranks of the New Order Kai, to carry out this vital mission. Armed with the special weapons and skills of a Grand Master, you embark upon a secret voyage to the distant Isle of Lorn. However, your mission becomes a life and death struggle when you encounter intrigue and danger en route.
The Buccaneers of Shadaki	1994
This is the second half of Lone Wolf's apprentice's voyage to the Isle of Lorn to return the Moonstone to its proper place among the Shianti. The book is notable for retracing, in a sense, the steps of the protagonist Grey Star in The World of Lone Wolf series. Major characters and events from that series, such as Grey Star, Agarash the Damned, Shasarak the Wytch-King and Mother Magri, are referenced in passing, and a number of important locations such as the city of Shadaki and the Inn of the Laughing Moon in Suhn make cameo appearances.
Mydnight's Hero	1995
The King of Siyen has been assassinated. Prince Karvas is the sole heir of this rich and powerful realm but he lives in exile in distant Sheasu – 'the Isle of Lost Heroes'. In his absence, evil Baron Sadanzo and his army of robber knights have staked their claim to the vacant throne. In Mydnight's Hero, your quest is to voyage to Sheasu and track down Prince Karvas in the fabled city of Mydnight. Once found you must persuade him to return with you to Siyen without delay. You have only 50 days in which to complete this challenging quest or Siyen will be enslaved by the tyrannical Sadanzo and his brutal followers.
Rune War	1995
Evil Lord Vandyan of Eldenora has unearthed the lost secrets of rune magics used by Agarash the Damned during his ancient conquest of Magnamund. Empowered by his discoveries, Vandyan unleashes his armies upon the peaceful realms of the Free Alliance with swift and devastating effect. Lone Wolf, Supreme Master of the Kai, leads the crusade to defeat Vandyan before all Magnamund succumbs to his tyrannical rule. Your task is to infiltrate Skull-Tor, Lord Vandyan's stronghold, and destroy the ancient runes from which he draws his evil power.
Trail of the Wolf	1997
Lone Wolf has been abducted by the forces of the Dark God Naar and imprisoned in a remote city-fortress on the border of the Darklands. Subjected to relentless attacks by the minions of evil, the Supreme Master of the Kai is surely doomed to die unless a rescue can be affected swiftly and successfully. You must venture alone into the dreaded stronghold of Gazad Helkona to find and free your leader.
The Fall of Blood Mountain	1997
For centuries the Shom'zaa has lain incarcerated and forgotten in a granite prison located deep below the mountains of Bor. Now this terrifying beast has accidentally been set free, and its hunger for vengeance knows no bounds. With a horde of vile minions at its command, swiftly the Shom'zaa enacts its sinister plan to destroy King Ryvin and the wondrous realm of the Drodarin dwarves. You must journey to the subterranean kingdom of the dwarves and attempt to save your ancient allies from the wrath of the Shom'zaa.
Vampirium	1998
The Claw of Naar is the evil wand of power used by Agarash the Damned during his ancient conquest of Magnamund. Legend held that it had been lost forever in the molten ruins of Naaros, but now it has resurfaced, and its dread return heralds a dawn of disaster for the peaceable nations of Magnamund. Your allies, the wise wizards of the Elder Magi, have the power and the means to destroy the accursed Claw, but they do not possess it. In Vampirium, you must venture into the hostile land of Bhanar and snatch the Claw from the clutches of the evil Autarch Sejanoz.
The Hunger of Sejanoz	1998 (2022 for the extended version)
After escaping Bhanar with the Claw of Naar and having given it to the Elder Magi in the previous adventure, the Grand Master doesn't have the time to relax in the neighbouring Chai: there is news of an invasion force sent by the Autarch Sejanoz of Bhanar to lay siege to the palace in Pensei, capital of the country. Xo-lin, Khea Khan of Chai, must be rescued and brought to sanctuary in the distant city of Tazhan across the Lissanian Plain and safeguarded from the hunger of the vile Sejanoz. Originally published with only 300 sections, the book was expanded to 350 sections by Holmgard Press in 2022, adding various new branching paths through the course of the adventure.
The Storms of Chai	2016
After retrieving it in Vampirium, you have handed over the Claw of Naar to the Elder Magi who had since then tried to destroy it. That was 18 years ago but the Elder Magi are still trying to figure out how to annihilate this evil item. You are now living in the new Kai Monastery on the Isle of Lorn and grim news are brought to your attention: several hordes of Agarashi have been spotted all over Magnamund, one of them marching towards the country of Chai, ruled by the young Khea-khan Lao Tin. The reason: one of the gems that embellish the Khea-khan's throne is the Eye of Agarash, a stone that can be coupled with the Claw of Naar to increase its destructive power. Your mission is to retrieve the Eye of Agarash before your enemies and bring it back to the Elder Magi.
Dead in the Deep	2019
Kai Grand Master Steel Hand is imprisoned in the ruins of the ancient Lyrisian city of Emolyria, on the brink of the Maakengorge, the largest mustering points of the servants of darkness. The Brotherhood of the Crystal Star and the Sages of Varetta have prepared a diversion to allow you to infiltrate Emolyria's vast subterranean dungeons to save Steel Hand. However, in the depths of Northern Magnamund lies a terrible but forgotten power, the true legacy of the Darklords, harnessed by the evil denizens of Emolyria. Fiery, hungry, and fed by the endless pain of the Restless Dead. Ready to rise from Maakengorge and consume your world. Will you succeed where one of your comrades has failed?
The Dusk of Eternal Night	2020
Archlord Vashna has returned. Sommerlund is under threat of invasion, and as a commander in Lone Wolf's army, you must prepare to face the Legion of the Restless Dead. But another tide of Darkness rises to threaten all Magnamund, in the Dark God Naar's unholy name. You will uncover a secret society, shrouded in mystery. Some hide among the courts, guilds and armies of the Freelands, others amongst the black sorcerers and warriors of the Darklands. In an epic adventure spanning Southern Magnamund, you must infiltrate hidden lairs protected by ancient spells in a race against time to stop them. They who for millennia have schemed, preparing a ritual to free the True Son of Naar.
Light of the Kai, Vol. 1	2026
In this penultimate book, the reader plays both as Lone Wolf and the character of the previous books. An age of war has engulfed the world. The two greatest Champions of Darkness now stride freely across the lands, and only the Kai Supreme Masters and their allies remain to oppose them. Yet strength of arms alone will not suffice. Outnumbered and outmatched, a daring plan must be forged. One that will lead your company into forsaken northern reaches where old foes stir and long‑buried secrets awaken.Yet beneath the ruin and the roar of war, Magnamund herself grows weary. If you cannot unravel the mystery of Aetheris there may soon be no world left to save.
Light of the Kai, Vol. 2	TBA

=== Spin-off gamebook series ===
==== The World of Lone Wolf ====
All four World of Lone Wolf books were written by Ian Page and edited by Joe Dever. In 2005 the gamebooks were made available for free download at Project Aon.

The series plays for the most part at the tip of south-eastern Magnamund, in the land then known as the Shadakine Empire, and features Grey Star, a human that was raised by the Shianti, a race of demi-gods.

According to a 2008 interview with Joe Dever, Grey Star was actually the principal character that Ian Page played in Dever's Dungeons & Dragons campaign in the late 1970s. Since Ian Page had created a detailed backstory for Grey Star and fleshed out many aspects of southern Magnamund, Joe Dever convinced him to write a four-book story arc centered on this character, and to include his contributions in the Magnamund setting.

In February 2015, Joe Dever announced on Facebook that the World of Lone Wolf series will be republished in deluxe edition by Mantikore Verlag in German. In November 2016, Megara Entertainment launched a successful Kickstarter campaign to republish the first book of this series in English. A subsequent successfully-funded campaign failed to produce any rewards for backers and Megara Entertainment was later dissolved.

Name	Release date
Grey Star the Wizard	1985
A tyrant called Shasarak the Wytch-King has subjugated the people and with the help of seven Shadaki Wytches is ruling with an iron fist. The Shianti, members of a mystical race, wish to help, but because of their exile on the Isle of Lorn they are forced to remain neutral in the conflict. However, one night the situation changes when a storm wrecks a vessel near the island, with a human infant being the only survivor. In this child the Shianti see a chance to help the people of Magnamund without breaking their vow to Ishir, and they raise the boy in the arts of magic, giving him the name Grey Star: the star as the symbol of hope, and grey for the white-grey streak the boy has in his dark hair. Once his training is complete, Grey Star is sent out to retrieve the Moonstone, an ancient Shianti artefact, from the Daziarn, for only with its power can Shasarak be defeated
The Forbidden City	1986
The Second installment of the World of Lone Wolf series takes place after Grey Star has found the Lost Tribe of Azanam. Grey Star begins his journey with the aid of a Kundi mystic named Urik, and journeys through Desolation Valley, beyond the Mountains of Morn. There, he makes new allies, faces new dangers, and helps to stoke the flames of a fledgling rebellion against the Shadakine Empire, all in a desperate attempt to find the Shadow Gate and travel through it to the Daziarn plane and retrieve the Moonstone of the Shianti.
Beyond the Nightmare Gate	1986
In an attempt to find the lost Moonstone of the Shianti and destroy the Shadakine empire, Grey Star made his way to the location of the Shadow Gate and beyond into the realm of the Daziarn itself. The Daziarn is a shadow realm with many strange beings and fearsome creatures inhabiting it. Grey Star is forced to travel across the gray plains of the Neverness to find the Moonstone but comes upon an unexpected ally; Tanith, the young witch apprentice who became his companion in Grey Star the Wizard and was kidnapped by Shasarak's demonic servant. With her help, he must retrieve the Moonstone and find a way to return to Magnamund if the Wytch-King is to be defeated.
War of the Wizards	1986
In this, the final installment of the World of Lone Wolf, Grey Star and Tanith have just completed a harrowing quest in the Shadow realm of the Daziarn. Upon retrieving the Moonstone, the two return to Magnamund to find the forces of good and evil poised on the brink of final conflict. Shasarak has enlisted the aid of the dreaded demon lord Agarash the Damned in order to eradicate the resistance movement once and for all. Battling their way through hordes of demons and undead minions, Grey Star and Tanith must struggle to rejoin the Freedom Guild, defeat the forces of the Wytch-King, and fulfil his destiny and promise to the Shianti.

==== Autumn Snow ====
In the years 2010–2011, the French associative editor Scriptarium published original adventures in its webzine Draco Venturus. These adventures formed the Autumn Snow series, featuring the eponymous female Kai Lord from the Second Kai Order, and is written by French-Canadian author Martin Charbonneau. In September 2014, Megara Entertainment announced that it would publish these adventures in a gamebook format, both in French and English. Joe Dever approved the series which features artwork by Gary Chalk. However, Megara Entertainment closed before the whole series was published.

In episode 20 of the podcast Journeys Through Magnamund, it was announced that Holmgard Press would publish the seven planned books of the series. On October 24th, 2024, Holmgard Press officially released revised versions of the first two books of the series, along with the third one.

Name	Release date
The Pit of Darkness	2015, revised version: 2024
Originally published in French in the first issue of Draco Venturus, summer 2010.
The Wildlands Hunt	2019, revised version: 2024
Originally published in French in the second issue of Draco Venturus, summer 2011.
Slaves of the Mire	2024

==== The Huntress ====
In February 2024, Holmgard Press released The Huntress, a trilogy of gamebooks written by long-time fan Jonathan Stark. This trilogy is set 50 years before the start of the main series and features a bounty-hunter known as The Huntress trying to recover her memory. But the search of her past will also lead her to discover truths that could have an impact on all Magnamund.

A prologue to the trilogy, called Shadows Over Fire, was published online and can be played for free.

Name	Release date
Marked for Death	2024
Eight years ago, in MS 4992, you stumbled out of the Vassagonia Dry Main, your surcoat torn and covered in blood. You bore no memory of how you came to be in the desert, or who gave you your wounds. You soon became a mercenary and bounty hunter and though you have never stopped searching for your true name, a new one has been given to you by your clients. They call you the Huntress. Now, you come to the magical city of Toran, where the last of the noble Haert family has promised to tell you who you are in exchange for finding a lost relic of their house. Your hunt will take you on a mad chase through the city and a race for the truth — for you are not the only one after the Haert's secrets.
Quelling of the Flame	2024
After years of searching, a clue to your past has emerged. A secret society known as The Waking Flame claims to know who you are and where you come from. To find them you must head to the ancient land of Dessi, but the task will not be an easy one — even for The Huntress. You must now travel to Dalobu, where forces more powerful and sinister than you could have imagined vie for control of the war-torn city. If you survive, the answers you seek may be kept in the Wandering Keep, a fortress that was never meant to be found, deep within the deadly Serpent Swamp.
Echoes of Eternity	2024
Many centuries ago, there was an island known as Voltac, a place of learning where it is said sickness and sorrow had been defeated. Then Naar destroyed the island forever, creating in its place the Dessi Trench. It is a place that no one dares to sail, but for you, it is the one place you can find the truth of who you are. In the final book of The Huntress trilogy, questions long asked may at last be answered. But tread lightly, for in uncovering your past you may unearth a betrayal thousands of years in the making. How the story ends is up to you - will you learn the truth? Or will you be crushed under the hand of Naar?

==== Chronicles of Magnamund (Holmgard Press) ====
In April 2025, Holmgard Press released the "Chronicles of Magnamund", an anthology series of gamebooks featuring various protagonists written by different authors. Each book explore a different genre of story-telling, from sci-fi to steampunk along with horror. The series reuse the name of "Chronicles of Magnamund" that was used by Mongoose Publishing for the novels set in the same universe but is not linked to that series.

Name	Author	Release date
Twilight's Edge	August Hahn	2025
You are Aeryth, a Shadakine Wytch aboard a skycutter powered by lost Shianti magic. As the Veil between worlds thins, ancient horrors drift toward Magnamund. You—and your silver mech wolf—must hold the line.
Forge of Shadows	Harley Truslove	2025
You are Leandra Redalion: outcast genius, betrayed by your own creations. Now, in the broken wastes of Karkaste, you must uncover your family’s final secret before a Drakkarim warlord conquers your homeland. But can you reclaim your legacy without becoming the monster they say you are?
The Weeping Place	Jonathan Stark	2025
The Tower was once a place of healing. Now it screams. As a Sage of Varetta returning to the asylum where you once trained, you will confront horrors both cosmic and human, piecing together the truth of what was done behind its doors—and what still waits inside them.

==== Bonus adventures ====
With the republication of the Lone Wolf series, Mongoose Publishing decided to add a bonus adventure at the end of each gamebook, except for Flight from the Dark. This concept was continued by Mantikore-Verlag and Holmgard Press in subsequent books, except for The Dusk of Eternal Night. These bonus adventures mainly feature a supporting character of the main story of the gamebook and have their own set of rules. They were written by different authors with the approbation of Joe Dever who edited and augmented their work while he was alive. After his death, staff at Holmgard Press took over the supervising duty. Contrary to the main adventures which nearly all have 350 sections, these bonus stories don't have a fixed number of sections.

Although most of them are not linked to each other, five of these adventures form the Dire Series featuring the same character, a Talestrian soldier cursed with undeath and blessed by Kai. Equipment and abilities can be carried over during the course of this subseries.

Book published in	Name	Number of sections	Author	Release date
2	The Crown of King Alin IV	71	Vincent N. Darlage	2007
In this adventure, you play the part of Lord-lieutenant Rhygar, a Knight of the White Mountain who aided Lone Wolf on his second adventure, Fire on the Water. This adventure is set in the year MS 5048, two years before the events described in the main adventure.
3	Vonotar's Web	120	Laszlo Cook	2007
In this adventure, you play Loi-Kymar, an elder member of the Brotherhood of the Crystal Star, knowledgeable in the left-handed magic of the Brotherhood and well-versed in the myriad use of the herbs that can be found throughout magnamund. In addition, you have been given the honour and responsibility of bearing a unique Guildstaff; only yours has the power to teleport, a power that makes you one of the most well-travelled people on the planet! Unfortunately, this power has also attracted the unwanted attention of the renegade wizard Vonotar, who desires the Guildstaff for himself.
4	Ruanon	150	James M. Stuart	2008
In this adventure, you play Captain D'Val, a respected officer in the King's Guard of Sommerlund. You and your men received vast praise for your recent actions at the siege of Holmgard.
5	The Tomb of the Majhan	90	Richard Ford	2008
In this adventure, you play Tipasa Edarouk of Ikaresh, also known as Tipasa the Wanderer – he who roams the Dry Main. On your many travels you have seen many wondrous things and heard tales beyond imagining but it is a legend that originates in your own nation of Vassagonia that still tantalises you the most. The Tomb of the Majhan is the fabled burial place of the ancient rulers of Vassagonia, the legendary Zakhans of old and is said to house riches beyond the dreams of any king. It is the location of this ancient crypt that you have sought for so long and now, after many years of wandering, you have discovered its location
6	The Key to the Future	187	Joseph C. Williams	2008
In this adventure, you play Gwynian the Sage, the master astrologer who has followed Lone Wolf's saga by reading the stars. When the time comes to aid the Kai Lord on his quest to retrieve the mysterious and powerful Lorestones, the sage encounters a barrier that he must overcome if he is to bestow upon Lone Wolf the only means to unlock the whereabouts of the first Lorestone. Failure will not only cause the Lorestone's whereabouts to remain a mystery, but it will also place the last Kai Lord's life in danger of a deadly trap.
7	The All Seeing One	127	Nick Robinson	2008
In this adventure, you play Tavig, an adventurer trapped in Kazan-Oud. After a deadly cat & mouse game, you are once again captured by Lord Zahda's beastmen and thrown in a pit at the bottom of which resides a monster called the Thing. But before you are thrown to your doom, you hear your captors talking of Zahda's plan of breaking the magical prison that the Elder Magi have erected around the fortress, a plan that has been developed with The All Seeing One. You, Tavig of Suentina, decides to thwart this plan.
8	Masquerade in Hikas	152	Darren Pearce	2009
You are Paido, a Vakeros Knight, one of an elite guard of warrior magicians who protect the land of Dessi. Of late, your mentors and superiors – the Elder Magi – have been receiving worrying reports that the Dessian city of Hikas has been infiltrated by Darklord agents and assassins. You receive the mission to investigate the strange events in Hikas and report them to your superiors.
9	The Guildmaster's Hammer	100	Richard Ford	2009
Maghana, the Guildmaster of Thieves of Tahou, is asking you, Sogh of Suentina, to steal the hammer of the Guildmaster of Masons. But this mission is easier said than done...
10	Echoes of Lost Light	120	August Hahn	2009
You are Lone Wolf, also known as Skarn in the annals of fate. While questing for the Lorestones, you ran afoul of Darklord Gnaag and you were sent headlong into a seemingly endless plummet into the darkness of the Daziarn. Although Gnaag has failed to destroy you, he has succeeded in banishing you into a lightless realm from which there will be no easy escape... The Lorestone of Luomi, that you have just grasped a few seconds before falling into the Shadow Gate, calls out for your help and brings you on a spiritual journey into Lost Luomi where you must prevent the minions of Naar from stealing the light of the mystical stone for their master.
11	Lord of Meledor	150	James M. Stuart	2009
You are Lorkon Ironheart, commander of the army of Meledor. Some two years have passed since the Aonian Lone Wolf came to your lands and defeated the Chaos-master in battle. Since that time, under your guidance and authority, the forces of Meledor have successfully driven back the remaining chaos beasts that once wandered the forests of Vhozada. The borders of Meledor have expanded, and although there still dangerous creatures, bandits and chaos beasts hidden in the darkest of forests and remotest of places, you are confident that a new and lasting age of prosperity can be sustained. Rumours of increased banditry and raids against villages in the Nahma trisect have recently come to your attention. The exact situation is unclear, however, for the bandits leave few alive as witness to their operations. You are not prepared to allow these attacks to go on any longer and you resolve to put an end to it, personally.
12	Aboard the Intrepid	100	Vincent N. Darlage	2009
You are Captain Borse, the captain of the caravel Intrepid. One night, you rescue a man named Vijya Nath who is looking for an island called Thor Golgron. Will you help this mysterious man by searching the island or will you ignore his request? Some men aboard your ship might take the decision for you...
13	Plague Agent	150	James M. Stuart	2010
You are Tennan, a druid and member of the Herbalish order, one of the herbwardens of Bautar. On your way to Quarlen, you come across an agent sent by Archdruid Cadak, leader of the Cener druids. You don't know it yet, but the actions you will take against this agent of the Cener will have an impact not only on your life but on all Magnamund.
14	Darkness Most Dire	120	August Hahn	2010
You are a soldier from the Freeland Alliance. Or so you were. You are now a zombie, walking in the endless halls of Kaag Tower. One day, you cross path with Lone Wolf, who came looking for his friend Banedon. This short meeting brings you back to your sense: you now want to escape from Kaag. How an undead being could possibly succeed in this quest?
15	Castle Akital	150	Nic Bonczyk & Joe Dever	2011
You are Captain Prarg, an experienced officer in the army of Lencia. One year before the events of The Darke Crusade, you are sent to Lozonzee, a former Drakkarim city in Nyras that has been recaptured by the Lencians. There, you learn that a Lencian outpost near this town, Castle Akital, hasn't given sign of life for three weeks. It will be up to you to discover what really happened at the castle.
16	A Long and Dire Road	100	August Hahn	2011
This is the sequel to Darkness Most Dire. After fleeing Kaag, you arrive to the Durncrag Mountains. You are about to start crossing them to enter Sommerlund when you hear human cries. As a zombie, what will be the choices that will lead you out of the Darklands?
17	Labyrinth of Sorrow	150	Darren Pearce & Charlotte Law	2012
You are Karoth the Helghast, a spy for the Darklords of Helgedad. You have come to Ixia to gather information for your masters and it has now been six years that you are on that mission. You don't know that the Darklords have been killed by Lone Wolf, so when you get new orders to prevent the return of Deathlord Ixiataaga, you do as you are instructed to do. But one question lingers: who sent you on that quest?
18	The Dead of Chrude	250	Nic Bonczyk & Joe Dever	2013
In this adventure, you play the role of Jergor, a vigilante peasant from the Palmyrion borderlands. Repeatedly, marauding mobs from Eldenora have crossed into the ravaged borderland of Palmyrion to loot its remains and torment its shattered people. The Palmyrion army is engaged with the armies of Eldenora in fierce battles at Holona, and all of its cavalry are engaged in the fight. There are no mounted troops available to stop the swift raids made by the Eldenoran plunderers in the north. The future of your family and kinfolk will be determined by your success or failure in this adventure.
19	Dire Straights	150	August Hahn	2013
The story is the third part in the continuing story of Dire, a Talestrian soldier cursed with undeath and blessed by Kai. After reaching the Kai Monastery, Lone Wolf himself sends you on a mission to stop a plan by the forces of evil.
20	The Purifiers of Kazan-Oud	185	Vincent Lazzari, Eric Dubourg & Reinaldo Gomez-Larenas	2014
You are a young Magician of Dessi in the city of Herdos. When a series of murders terrifies the city, you investigate the matter.
21	Echoes of the Moonstone	300	Eberhard Eschwe and Swen Harder	2015
As Grand Master Lone Wolf, you decide to send one of your Kai Masters to the Isle of Lorn with the Moonstone, events that are described in the main adventure of Voyage of the Moonstone. To draw your enemies attention away from your pupil, you board the Cloud Dancer with a copy of the Moonstone and make Naar's minions believe that you will bring the precious jewel yourself to the Shianti. Of course, by doing this, you are also putting yourself in great danger...
22	A Wytch's Nightmare	150	Vincent Lazzari & Alexander Kühnert	2015
You are Yenna, an orphaned girl that now serves Lady Tanith of Shadaki as a bodyguard. However, since Grey Star, her husband, is now missing, you are tasked to find his whereabouts.
23	Lost in the Kelderwastes	150	Florent Haro & Vincent Lazzari	2019
You are Acraban, Wizard of the Brotherhood of the Crystal Star. Your skyship, the Starstrider, has just crashed in the Kelderwastes. Luckily, she can be fixed but not after a month-long effort to craft new parts. Close before you are able to fly again, one of your patrols goes missing. You decide to find them, even if it means going far into uncharted territories.
24	The Traitor's Reward	270	Gavyn F. Duthie	2019
You are Kalen of Salony, a Stornlander sellsword and veteran of many wars. You are the leader of your company, hired by Slovian princes to fight against the Eldenoran army in what is known as The Rune War. However, you'll soon discover that your enemies are not all from Magnamund but also from another world...
25	Dire in the Dark	125	August Hahn	2020
This is the fourth part of the ongoing story of Dire. Having fallen into the deepest parts of Magnamund's underground, an unlikely ally helps you for the next part of your adventure.
26	Destiny Most Dire	125	August Hahn	2020
This is the fifth and last part of the story of Dire. Still pursuing Azavath, you have no time to lose if you want to stop him once and for all!
27	Shadow Stalkers	175	Florent Haro	2021
This adventure was first supposed to be published in book 31. However, due to the sizes of both the main adventure and this bonus adventure, it was decided that it would be published in book 27. In this adventure, you play as Ernan, the Captain of the 1st Kirlundin Isles Marine Cassel that once help the New Order Grand Master on his trip to bring the Moonstone to its creators. Eighteen years after this adventure, you are asked to travel to Hammerdal following the brutal Long Winter War to rekindle the alliance between Durenor and Sommerlund. But the forces of darkness will try anything to stop you and your mission.
28	The Edge of Night	150	August Hahn	2022
For many years, you have been bound to the will of Sejanoz. With his death, your mind has been freed, but your torment has only just begun. The True, blood disciples of Naar are already vying for power in the absence of the Autarch. Can you survive long enough to escape the capital and rescue your son?
29	The Tides of Gorgoron	150	Vincent Lazzari & Joe Dever	2016
You are Lord Elkamo Doko, a Vakeros Warrior-Mage assigned to the garrison of Anasundi. It has been a full year since Agarashi hordes came out of the Chasm of Gorgoron to attack Dessi. You are tasked to protect a bridge on the Colo river but when a party of your scouts don't come back from a patrol to the village of Cano, you know something bad is about to happen.
30	The Kaum Before The Storm	120	August Hahn	2019
You are Grand Master Blazer, one of the six Grand Masters sent by Supreme Master Lone Wolf to fulfill different missions in Magnamund. Yours is to investigate rumours of a rising force of strange new monstrosities in the nation of Circoria, seek out their source and put an end to them. But the chasm of Kraknalorg hides more secrets than you first thought...
The Lone Wolf Omnibus	One Last Fehmarn	150	Shane Walsh-Smith	2024
You are Dawn Strider, a Kai Virin stationed in the borderlands of the Western Durncrags. It is two days before Fehmarn. Can you reach the Kai Monastery to warn your kin about what’s coming? The way south is dangerous. Not only are the skies full of Kraan, but a mysterious figure tracks your every move.

With the release of the Collector's Edition of the Lone Wolf series, French publisher Megara Entertainment planned to also republish the World of Lone Wolf series in a Collector's Edition format with bonus adventures. However, financial woes prevented the publication of any other books past the first one.

Book published in	Name	Number of sections	Author	Release date
WoLW 1	Druse Quest	165	Florent Haro, edited and augmented by Vincent Lazzari	2017
You are Madin Rendalim, Herbwarden of Bautar, on a mission in the Shadakine Empire to find the Druse Tree which you will use to cure the Red Plague that has struck Durenor. But you will have to face the mutant creatures of the forest before evading Shadakine Soldiers that will do anything to stop you.

===== In other languages =====
In Sweden, the republication of the books include brand new official bonus adventures starting with book 8. Although originally written in English, these adventures have yet to be published in that language.

Book published in	Name	Number of sections	Author	Release date
8	The Slavers of Xanar	unknown	Vincent Lazzari & Joe Dever	2018
In this adventure, you play Vagur, a skilled dwarf shooter from Bor, enlisted in His Majesty Ryvin's Royal Army.
9	The Lost and the Damned	unknown	Gavyn F. Duthie & Andreas Andreou	2021
In this adventure, you get to reconnect with Shaar, whose mission is to protect the Lorestone Lone Wolf needs in his fight against the Darklords.
10	Partisan	unknown	Erik Zetterberg	2022
You play the smuggler Sebb Jarrel from Eru, who leads his brave countrymen against the agents of darkness.

In Germany, some new bonus adventures were published in certain books of the main Lone Wolf series (LW) and the spin-off World of Lone Wolf series (WoLW). One has even been published as a complete separated gamebook. Again, they have yet to be published in English. They were all written by Alexander Kühnert.

Book published in	Name	Number of sections	Author	Release date
Standalone gamebook	The Disciples of Darkness	120	Alexander Kühnert	2016
You are Tessa, a young woman who fled south during the war against the Darklords and was taken in by the herbalists of Bautar. While you are beginning your training as a druid there, you are surprisingly given the task of traveling to the Darklands in Sun Valley. It is a journey that is not only full of dangers, but will also take you to your mental limits. Do you have the strength to face your fate or will it break you?
WoLW 2	Treasures of Madness	150	Alexander Kühnert	2018
You play the thief Hugi who has to escape back through the Forbidden City after the events of the main adventure, facing lots of craziness... and finding lots of loot!
WoLW 3	The Chains of Ghol-Tabras	170	Alexander Kühnert, story by Vincent Lazzari	2019
You play Captain Havaroez who has to prevent the fleet of Shasarak from leaving Ghol-Tabras so it cannot transfer troops from the north of Shadaki to attack Karnali.
WoLW 4	Battle of the Wytches	180	Alexander Kühnert	2020
You play Tanith who has to travel to Port of Suhn to confront Mother Magri and free the city from her rule, taking place parallel to the main adventure with Grey Star.
LW 27	The Spawn of Hate	170	Alexander Kühnert	2022
You play Gildas. You and your small group of border rangers have to investigate an attack from a new kind of Agarashi in the South of Siyen, but things escalate quickly, with the issue becoming a possibly world-ending threat...

=== Novels ===
==== Legends of Lone Wolf ====
A series of novelizations by John Grant (the nom de plume of Paul Barnett) were released entitled "Legends of Lone Wolf". They expanded on the adventures by introducing new characters (or fleshing out old ones from the book series), events and whole new stories.

In 2026, Holmgard Press announced that they will republish the series and that Shane Walsh-Smith would write five more novels, covering the remaining events of the gamebooks up to The Masters of Darkness.

Name	Release date
Eclipse of the Kai	1989
The events described in this novel take place before the first gamebook of the series, Flight from the Dark.
The Dark Door Opens	1989
Based on Flight from the Dark.
The Sword of the Sun	1989
Based on Fire on the Water. On the American market, this book was split into two smaller volumes, The Tides of Treachery and The Sword of the Sun.
Hunting Wolf	1990
Based on The Caverns of Kalte.
The Claws of Helgedad	1991
Lone Wolf is taken captive and held in the darklands as a pawn in a political struggle.
The Sacrifice of Ruanon	1991
Based on The Chasm of Doom. Contains an epilogue initially removed by the editor and Joe Dever which sees the events of the book referred to as legend in a setting bearing similarities to the contemporary real world.
The Birthplace	1992
Based on Shadow on the Sand. The author wrote an unpublished appendix on the sources of key ideas in the story.
The Book of the Magnakai	1992
Based on Shadow on the Sand.
The Tellings	1993
A collection of short stories taking place in Magnamund. The author wrote an unpublished foreword which presents the stories as reconstructions based on historical sources. Holmgard Press plan to republish the book with a new title, The Equinoctial Tellings.
The Lorestone of Varetta	1993
Based on The Kingdoms of Terror.
The Secret of Kazan-Oud	1994
Based on Castle Death. Holmgard Press plan to republish the book with a new title, Labyrinth.
The Rotting Land	1994
Based on The Jungle of Horrors.
The Guardians of Zaaryx	TBA
Based on The Cauldron of Fear.
The Wrath of Gnaag	TBA
Based on The Dungeons of Torgar.
Twilight of the World	TBA
Based on The Prisoners of Time.
The Antelucan Tellings	TBA
A collection of short stories taking place in Magnamund.
The Promise of Ishir	TBA
Based on The Masters of Darkness.

Dark Quest Books announced plans to release five omnibuses containing all twelve novels. However, only three omnibuses, covering the first eight novels, were released before Dark Quest Books closed.

==== Chronicles of Magnamund (Mongoose Publishing) ====
When Mongoose Publishing announced that it would republish the Lone Wolf series of gamebooks, it was also announced that two new trilogies of novels would be written under the generic name of Chronicles of Magnamund. The first novel, The Dragons of Lencia, is part of the Lencian Trilogy, written by Richard Ford. The second novel, Glory & Greed, is part of the trilogy named Rise of the Agarashi and is written by August Hahn, author of the first official version of the Lone Wolf Roleplaying Game. Both trilogies are set in the year MS 5100, 50 years after the events described in the first gamebook of the Lone Wolf series, Flight from the Dark. Since the cancellation of the Lone Wolf line by Mongoose Publishing, nothing is known about the fate of both trilogies.

Although using the same name, the "Chronicles of Magnamund" series of gamebooks published by Holmgard Press is not linked to this one.

===== The Lencian Trilogy =====
1. The Dragons of Lencia (2008)
2. The Shadow & the Skull (TBA)
3. The Lencian Trilogy #3 (TBA)

===== Rise of the Agarashi =====
1. Glory & Greed (2008)
2. Sand & Sorrow (TBA)
3. Triumph & Tragedy (TBA)

=== Roleplaying games ===
==== d20 series ====
The first version of Lone Wolf: The Roleplaying Game, published by Mongoose Publishing. All the books are authored by August Hahn.

- The Lone Wolf RPG
- The Darklands
- Magic of Magnamund
- Dawn of Destruction
- Blood Moon Rising

==== Multiplayer gamebook ====
A new version of the roleplaying game, Lone Wolf Multiplayer Game Book, was released in March 2010 by Mongoose Publishing. The rules for this new version are simpler and closer to the ones of the regular gamebook series. Numerous expansions were made available in the months after the original release. Other supplements were planned and announced by Mongoose Publishing but, on 27 February 2013, it was announced that the publisher had lost its licensing rights on these books.

- The Lone Wolf Multiplayer Gamebook by Joe Dever and Matthew Sprange
- Terror of the Darklords by Pete Nash and Joe Dever (June 2010)
- Heroes of Magnamund by Joe Dever and Matthew Sprange (July 2010)
- Sommerlund by Joe Dever and Darren Pearce (October 2010)
- Magnamund Bestiary by Joe Dever and Darren Pearce (January 2011)
- Book of the Magnakai by August Hahn and Joe Dever (March 2011)
- Corruption of Ikaya by Mark Gedak (May 2011)
- The Darklands by Vincent Lazzari and Joe Dever (September 2011)
- Stornlands I by Joe Dever, Vincent Lazzari, Florent Haro, Éric Dubourg, Gérald Degryse and Emmanuel Luc (August 2012)

Announced but not released:

- Stornlands II by Joe Dever, Vincent Lazzari, Florent Haro, Éric Dubourg, Gérald Degryse & Emmanuel Luc
- The Kai Monastery by Joe Dever, Éric Dubourg, Vincent Lazzari & August Hahn
- Drakkarim by Joe Dever, Vincent Lazzari, Florent Haro, Éric Dubourg, Gérald Degryse & Emmanuel Luc
- Untitled supplement on Vassagonia
- Untitled supplement on Durenor

==== The Lone Wolf Adventure Game ====
In April 2013, Cubicle 7 announced that they were picking up the rights to publish a Lone Wolf RPG. This new version was called The Lone Wolf Adventure Game and it contains a new version of the Lone Wolf Multiplayer Gamebook that have been "extensively reviewed, revised, and expanded upon with new material from Joe Dever, the Scriptarium team, and the Cubicle 7 team". In August 2014, a successful Kickstarter campaign took place and raised £68,005 to help funding the creation of the game. This new version was released at the end of September 2015. In July 2021, the editor announced that it was ceasing the publication

- The Lone Wolf Adventure Game by Joe Dever and Cubicle 7 (September 2015)
- Rookhaven by August Hahn, an add-on exclusive to the Kickstarter campaign (2016)
- Heroes of Magnamund by Joe Dever and Matthew Sprange, modified by the Cubicle 7 team (Spring 2016)
- Adventures of the Kai by Joe Dever and Cubicle 7 (June 2016)
- Magnamund Menagerie by Joe Dever and Darren Pearce, modified by the Cubicle 7 team (February 2017)
- Bestiary of the Beyond by Joe Dever and Cubicle 7 (May 2017)
- Terror of the Darklords by Joe Dever and Pete Nash, modified by the Cubicle 7 team (October 2017)
- The Realm of Sommerlund by Joe Dever and Darren Pearce, modified by the Cubicle 7 team (2018)

=== Other books ===
Title	Release date	Media type
The Magnamund Companion	1986	Encyclopedia
The book has been out of print for many years and is very rare. It is the most comprehensive source of information on the mythos of the Lone Wolf book series. Since the book has gone out of print, as have many of the Lone Wolf series, Joe Dever has given exclusive right to Project Aon to convert the book to PDF format and place it online for free download.
The Skull of Agarash	1994	Graphic Novel
The Skull of Agarash is the first and only (to-date) graphic novel in the Lone Wolf series. The plot involves an ancient artifact called the Skull of Agarash the Damned, which is used by Khadro's band of pirates to wreak havoc. During one of their raids, Lone Wolf's mentor, Lord Rimoah of the Elder Magi, is kidnapped by the rogues, forcing Lone Wolf to pursue them and find their hidden lair. It was drawn by Cyril Julien (pages 3 to 31) and Brian Williams (pages 32 to 66 and the covers). The original B&W version in now out of print, and is highly valued by many collectors. A digital version was released in July 2005 by Project Aon adding it to the many other books in the Lone Wolf series released in the same way. A colorized version was released by Holmgard Press in May 2024. It includes Dawn of the Darklord, a short choose your own adventure that was originally published in the Magnamund Companion in the 80s. This version was adapted as a playable branching graphic novel by artist Shane Walsh-Smith.
Lone Wolf Poster Painting Book	1987	Art book
Notes: by Gary Chalk
The Art of Lone Wolf	2016	Art book
Notes: The Art of Lone Wolf features all of Gary Chalk's artwork from the original Lone Wolf books 1 to 8 (1984 to 1986). The artwork of the first book of the Autumn Snow series (2015), published by Megara Entertainment, is also included.
Lone Wolf Anthology, volume 1: Hope in Darkness	2024	Short stories
A collection of 12 short stories set in Magnamund.
Lone Wolf Anthology, volume 2: Echoes of the Past	2025	Short stories
A collection of 10 short stories set in Magnamund.
The New Age of War: Timeline to Light of the Kai	2025	Digital companion
Companion to Light of the Kai, chronicling the events that took place between gamebooks 31 and 32.

== Video games ==
Game	Release date		
Game	North America	PAL region	Japan
Flight from the Dark			
Notes: Spectrum game
Fire on the Water			
Notes: Spectrum game
Lone Wolf and the Mirror of Death			
Notes: Spectrum game
Flight from the Dark			
Notes: for Nintendo DS,
Fire on the Water			
Notes: for Nintendo DS,
The Caverns of Kalte			
Notes: for Nintendo DS, |
The Chasm of Doom			
Notes: for Nintendo DS,
Joe Dever's Lone Wolf			
Notes: iOS, macOS and Windows (2013), PS4 and Xbox One (2016), Nintendo Switch (2018)
The Fortress of Death			
Notes: iOS and macOS, TBA

== Other media ==
Title	Release date	Media type
Lone Wolf: The Forbidden Tower	1989	Interactive Telephone Adventure
Notes: "PhoneQuest" Interactive Telephone Adventures
Lone Wolf: The Fortress of Doom	1991	Interactive Telephone Adventure
Notes: "PhoneQuest" Interactive Telephone Adventures
Eclipse of the Kai	1992	Audiobook
Notes: Read by Edward de Souza
The Dark Door Opens	1993	Audiobook
Notes:
The Maps of Magnamund Collection	Since 2012	Maps
Starting in 2012, Joe Dever released various maps representing the world of Magnamund. Drawn by Italian artist Francesco Mattioli, this series of maps contains elements that were never published before. Each Map Board combines a highly detailed colour map on the front, with a world grid and useful background information about the map area depicted on the reverse. The text includes scenario ideas for creating adventures, with specific briefings tailored to each map board. On 12 March 2014, Cubicle 7 announced that it became the official publisher of these maps.: The World of Magnamund Map (Spring 2012): a huge map representing all of Magnamund.; The Maps of Magnamund Collection, set 1 (November 2012): contains maps of Sommerlund, Durenor, Vassagonia and Dessi.; The Maps of Magnamund Collection, set 2 (May 2013): contains maps of Kakush & Valerion, The Galdonlands, The Stornlands and Talestria.; The Maps of Magnamund Collection, set 3 (May 2014): contains maps of Bor & the Hammerlands, Lencia, the Drakkarim Homelands & the Hellswamps and Ixia & the Hardlands.; The Maps of Magnamund Collection, set 4 (May 2015): contains maps of the Western Darklands, the Central Darklands & Skaror, the Eastern Darklands and Eastern Kalte.; The Maps of Magnamund Collection, set 5 (November 2015): contains maps of Northern Shadaki, Central Shadaki, Southern Shadaki and the Shadakine Occupied Territories.; The Maps of Magnamund Collection, set 6 (November 2015): contains maps of Taklakot & Andui, Lissan, Chai, and Bhanar.; The Maps of Magnamund Collection, set 7 (November 2015): contains maps of Eastern Vaduzhan & Mythan, Western Vaduzhan, Telchos & Sheasu, and Cincoria & Klanos.; The Maps of Magnamund Collection, set 8 (November 2016): contains maps of Kasland, Starn, Boden & Ilion, Central Tentarias, and Midsea & Eastern Tentarias.; The Maps of Magnamund Collection, set 9 (November 2016): contains maps of Siyen, Lunarlia, Siyen & Naaros, Kaum, Halia & Lunarlia, and Southern Lunaria & The Kelderwastes.; The Maps of Magnamund Collection, set 10 (November 2016): contains maps of Northern Sadi Desert, Southern Sadi Desert, Southern Kalte & Northern Darklands, and Southeastern Kalte & Northeastern Darklands.
