= Paul Bonner =

British artist

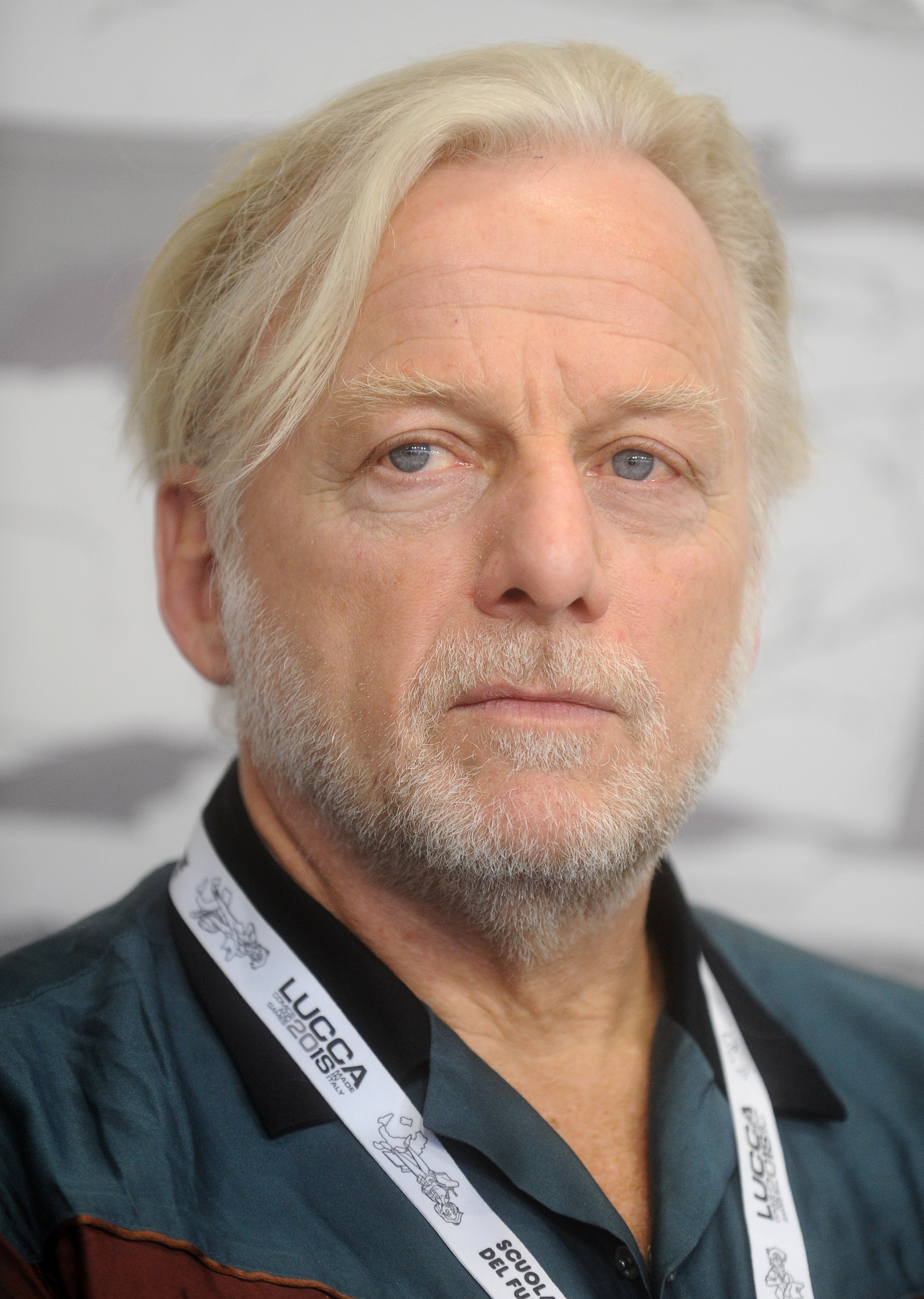
Paul Bonner at Lucca Comics & Games 2018

Paul Bonner is a fantasy artist who has produced artwork for fantasy gaming companies.

== Education ==
Paul Bonner spent four years at Harrow on an illustration course.

== Career ==
Paul Bonner illustrated the covers of the World of Lone Wolf series of gamebooks, including Grey Star the Wizard, The Forbidden City, Beyond the Nightmare Gate, and War of the Wizards.

His portfolio includes Games Workshop, FASA Corporation, Riotminds and Rackham. He has also illustrated several book covers, and a pair of posters for long-standing works in the fantasy genre (Tolkien and Lloyd Alexander). In 2008 his first collection of artwork 'Out of the Forests' was published. While not all-inclusive, it contained a sampling of most of his major projects. Bonner's work has also appeared numerous times in the yearly Spectrum art books.

His work for Dungeons & Dragons includes cover art for the adventures Die Vecna Die! and Into the Dragon's Lair.

Bonner's art work is notable for its use of vivid colours, contrast, and somewhat exaggerated features. Practically none of his work contains elves either, though most other 'standard' races are frequent. While typically depicting scenes of violence, few of his works actually show blood. Furthermore, his illustrations of typically savage creatures such as orcs, show a more sympathetic side than norm, including a fair amount of whimsy.

Bonner's work has been featured in Magic: The Gathering expansions, beginning with Eventide.

In 2005, Bonner won a silver-level Spectrum Award in the book category, for Cadwallon Goblin.

A 2007 book published by Titan Books was produced about Bonner and his works, called Out of the Forests: The Art of Paul Bonner.
