= Grey Star the Wizard =

1985 book by Ian Page

- Author: Ian Page
- Illustrator: Paul Bonner
- Cover artist: Iain McCaig (UK) Richard Corben (USA)
- Language: English
- Series: Lone Wolf
- Genre: Children's literature
- Publisher: Beaver Books (UK) Berkley / Pacer (USA)
- Publication date: 1985
- Publication place: United Kingdom
- Media type: Print (Paperback)
- ISBN: 0-09-944770-3
- OCLC: 13333342
- Followed by: The Forbidden City

Grey Star the Wizard is the first book in the World of Lone Wolf book series created by Joe Dever and written by Ian Page. It is one of four books in the mini-series and features Grey Star, for whom the first book is named, a young Wizard trained by the enigmatic Shianti to stop the Wytch-King and his Shadakine Empire. All four of the Grey Star books were released by Project Aon along with many of the other installments of the Lone Wolf series.

== Gameplay ==
The gameplay of the World of Lone Wolf series is very much like the other Lone Wolf books, but features a few key differences. One is the inclusion of Willpower, which can be used for various Magical effects in the game, and maybe most importantly to loose a blast of Magic from your Wizard's Staff when it is in your possession. The ability to vanquish some enemies with the expenditure of a Willpower point or two introduces a key strategic consideration in which the reader must choose between the likely loss of Endurance that comes with fighting enemies, and the amount of Willpower that should be saved for later in the story.

== Plot ==
The series plays for the most part at the tip of south-eastern Magnamund, in the land then known as the Shadakine Empire. A tyrant called Shasarak the Wytch-King has subjugated the people and with the help of seven Shadaki Wytches is ruling with an iron fist. The Shianti, members of a mystical race, wish to help, but because of their exile on the Isle of Lorn they are forced to remain neutral in the conflict. However, one night the situation changes when a storm wrecks a vessel near the island, with a human infant being the only survivor. In this child the Shianti see a chance to help the people of Magnamund without breaking their vow to Ishir, and they raise the boy in the arts of magic, giving him the name Grey Star: the star as the symbol of hope, and grey for the white-grey streak the boy has in his dark hair. Once his training is complete, Grey Star is sent out to retrieve the Moonstone, an ancient Shianti artefact, from the Daziarn, for only with its power can Shasarak be defeated. The first book of the series details Grey Star's travel to the Shadakine Empire and his desperate attempt to find a guide to lead him to the Shadow Gate.
