= The Buccaneers of Shadaki =

Book by Joe Dever

- British cover, original release
- Author: Joe Dever
- Illustrator: Brian Williams
- Cover artist: Brian Williams
- Language: English
- Series: Lone Wolf
- Genre: Fantasy
- Publisher: Red Fox
- Publication date: 1994
- Publication place: United Kingdom
- Media type: Print (Paperback)
- Preceded by: Voyage of the Moonstone
- Followed by: Mydnight's Hero

The Buccaneers of Shadaki is the twenty second book of the award-winning Lone Wolf book series.

== Plot ==
This is the second half of Lone Wolf's apprentice’s voyage to the Isle of Lorn to return the Moonstone to its proper place among the Shianti.

The book is notable for retracing, in a sense, the steps of the protagonist Grey Star in The World of Lone Wolf series. Major characters and events from that series, such as Grey Star, Agarash the Damned, Shasarak the Wytch-King and Mother Magri, are referenced in passing, and a number of important locations such as the city of Shadaki and the Inn of the Laughing Moon in Suhn make cameo appearances.
