= The Masters of Darkness =

Book by Joe Dever

- American cover, original release
- Author: Joe Dever
- Illustrator: Brian Williams
- Cover artist: Brian Salmon (UK); Peter Andrew Jones (UK); Neal McPheeters (USA)
- Language: English
- Series: Lone Wolf
- Genre: Fantasy
- Publisher: Beaver Books (UK); Red Fox (UK); Berkley / Pacer (USA)
- Publication date: 1988
- Publication place: United Kingdom
- Media type: Print (Paperback)
- ISBN: 0-425-11718-9
- OCLC: 19979714
- Preceded by: The Prisoners of Time
- Followed by: The Plague Lords of Ruel

The Master of Darkness is the twelfth book in the award-winning Lone Wolf book series created by Joe Dever. This is the final book in the Magnakai series.

== Gameplay ==
Lone Wolf books rely on a combination of thought and luck. Certain statistics such as combat skill and endurance attributes are determined randomly before play (reading). The player is then allowed to choose which Magnakai disciplines or skills they possess. This number depends directly on how many books in the series have been completed ("Magnakai rank"). With each additional book completed, the player chooses one additional Magnakai discipline.

The final book in the Magnakai series further reveals the quirks of the Lone Wolf game system, including putting players who have not played through the previous books at a substantial disadvantage in terms of Magnakai skills and rank. Nonetheless, it is still possible to triumph.

== Plot ==
After his struggles in the plane of Daziarn, Lone Wolf finally recovers the last of the Lorestones and finds a Shadow Gate back to his home. Unfortunately, upon his return, he finds that considerable time has passed and that, in his absence, the Darklords have conquered much of Magnamund. Now with all of the Lorestones' wisdom absorbed within him, and the hopes of Sommerlund and all the free peoples of Magnamund on his shoulders, Lone Wolf must travel to the very heart of the Darklords' foul realm, to the infernal city of Helgedad, and confront Archlord Gnaag himself. The adventure culminates with a spectacular battle in Helgedad and the destruction of the Darklords' principal city.
