= The Captives of Kaag =

Book by Joe Dever

- American cover, original release
- Author: Joe Dever
- Illustrator: Brian Williams
- Cover artist: Peter Andrew Jones (UK); Dave Dorman (USA)
- Language: English
- Series: Lone Wolf
- Genre: Fantasy
- Publisher: Red Fox (UK); Berkley / Pacer (USA)
- Publication date: 1991
- Publication place: United Kingdom
- Media type: Print (Paperback)
- ISBN: 0-425-13304-4
- OCLC: 25926559
- Preceded by: The Plague Lords of Ruel
- Followed by: The Darke Crusade

The Captives of Kaag is the fourteenth book in the Lone Wolf book series created by Joe Dever. This book, along with most of the books in the later half of the series is illustrated Brian Williams.

== Gameplay ==
Lone Wolf books rely on a combination of thought and luck. Certain statistics such as combat skill and endurance attributes are determined randomly before play. The player is then allowed to choose Grandmaster Kai disciplines and a selection of Dessi and Crystal Star magics. This number depends directly on how many books in the series have been completed ("Grandmaster rank"). With each additional book completed, the player chooses one additional discipline. The Grandmaster series is different from any in the previous series of books because it gives Lone Wolf spells to use which grow more numerous as his Grandmaster Rank increases.

== Plot ==
Three months after the events of The Plague Lords of Ruel, Lone Wolf learns that his friend, Guildmaster Banedon, has been abducted by a band of Giaks under the command of Nadziranim sorcerers. It is theorized that they are planning to torture him to extract magical techniques which can be united with their own dark sorcery. Lone Wolf and the reader must venture to Kaag, where Banedon is held, and attempt a rescue before he meets his demise, or worse, yields the coveted magical secrets of left-handed magic.
