= The Darke Crusade =

Book by Joe Dever

- American cover, original release
- Author: Joe Dever
- Illustrator: Brian Williams
- Cover artist: Peter Andrew Jones (UK); Dave Dorman (USA)
- Language: English
- Series: Lone Wolf
- Genre: Fantasy
- Publisher: Red Fox (UK); Berkley / Pacer (USA)
- Publication date: 1991
- Publication place: United Kingdom
- Media type: Print (Paperback)
- ISBN: 0-425-13798-8
- OCLC: 27765284
- Preceded by: The Captives of Kaag
- Followed by: The Legacy of Vashna

The Darke Crusade is the fifteenth book in the Lone Wolf book series created by Joe Dever and now illustrated by Brian Williams.

== Gameplay ==
Lone Wolf books rely on a combination of thought and luck. Certain statistics such as combat skill and endurance attributes are determined randomly before play. The player is then allowed to choose Grandmaster Kai disciplines and a selection of Dessi and Crystal Star magics. This number depends directly on how many books in the series have been completed ("Grandmaster rank"). With each additional book completed, the player chooses one additional discipline. The Grandmaster series is different from any in the previous series of books because it gives Lone Wolf spells to use which grow more numerous as his Grandmaster Rank increases.

== Plot ==
Once more, Lone Wolf's help is sought by a monarch, this time King Sarnac of Lencia. While battling the Drakkarim under control of Magnaarn, the High Warlord of Darke, the Lencians have discovered that Magnaarn seeks an ancient artifact, the Doomstone of Darke. It is feared that he is close to discovering this artifact, and with it, the power to rally the Nadziranim sorcerers and other Darklord allies against Lencia. Lone Wolf and the reader take up the cause of Lencia to thwart Magnaarn's aims.
