= The Dungeons of Torgar =

Book by Joe Dever

- American cover, original release
- Author: Joe Dever
- Illustrator: Brian Williams
- Cover artist: Brian Salmon (UK); Peter Andrew Jones (UK); Neal McPheeters (USA)
- Language: English
- Series: Lone Wolf
- Genre: Fantasy
- Publisher: Beaver Books (UK); Red Fox (UK); Berkley / Pacer (USA)
- Publication date: 1987
- Publication place: United Kingdom
- Media type: Print (Paperback)
- ISBN: 0-425-10930-5
- OCLC: 18846810
- Preceded by: The Cauldron of Fear
- Followed by: The Prisoners of Time

The Dungeons of Torgar is the tenth book in the Lone Wolf book series created by Joe Dever. These later books are illustrated by Brian Williams.

== Gameplay ==
Lone Wolf books rely on a combination of thought and luck. Certain statistics such as combat skill and endurance attributes are determined randomly before play (reading). The player is then allowed to choose which Magnakai disciplines or skills he or she possess. This number depends directly on how many books in the series have been completed ("Magnakai rank"). With each additional book completed, the player chooses one additional Magnakai discipline.

This book features an early decision/path where the book essentially splits down two different storylines for a good portion of the adventure, increasing replayability (i.e. by allowing the reader to play the book over again and take the alternate path). By this point in the adventure, a wise player may have gained enough Magnakai disciplines to have completed a Lore Circle or two, and may enjoy increased Combat Skill and Endurance because of it.

== Plot ==
After discovering that the three remaining Lorestones have fallen into the hands of the Darklords, Lone Wolf and his allies must formulate a daring plan to recover them. It is rumored that the stones are being kept in the grim Drakkarim fortress-city of Torgar, where the darklords' evil sorcerers (the Nadziranim) are searching for the means to destroy them. Once more, Lone Wolf must make haste in an attempt to recover the Lorestones before the Nadziranim can bring about their destruction. The adventure ends with an exciting twist, which threatens to banish Lone Wolf from Magnamund for all time.
