= The Deathlord of Ixia =

Book by Joe Dever

- American cover, original release
- Author: Joe Dever
- Illustrator: Brian Williams
- Cover artist: Peter Andrew Jones (UK); Dave Dorman (USA)
- Language: English
- Series: Lone Wolf
- Genre: Fantasy
- Publisher: Red Fox (UK); Berkley / Pacer (USA)
- Publication date: 1992
- Publication place: United Kingdom
- Media type: Print (Paperback)
- ISBN: 0-425-14459-3
- OCLC: 31347337
- Preceded by: The Legacy of Vashna
- Followed by: Dawn of the Dragons

The Deathlord of Ixia is the seventeenth entry in the Lone Wolf gamebook series, written by Joe Dever and now illustrated by Brian Williams.

== Gameplay ==
Lone Wolf books rely on a combination of thought and luck. Certain statistics such as combat skill and endurance attributes are determined randomly before play. The player is then allowed to choose Grandmaster Kai disciplines and a selection of Dessi and Crystal Star magics. This number depends directly on how many books in the series have been completed ("Grandmaster rank"). With each additional book completed, the player chooses one additional discipline. The Grandmaster series is different from any of the previous series of books because it gives Lone Wolf spells to use which grow more numerous as his Grandmaster Rank increases.

This game is notable for the very elaborate plot and the extremely difficult combat skill of the Deathlord, making him one of the hardest of all opponents in the entire game series.
