= The Plague Lords of Ruel =

Book by Joe Dever

- American cover, original release
- Author: Joe Dever
- Illustrator: Brian Williams
- Cover artist: Peter Andrew Jones (UK); Dave Dorman (USA)
- Language: English
- Series: Lone Wolf
- Genre: Fantasy
- Publisher: Red Fox (UK); Berkley / Pacer (USA)
- Publication date: 1990
- Publication place: United Kingdom
- Media type: Print (Paperback)
- ISBN: 0-425-13245-5
- OCLC: 25569257
- Preceded by: The Masters of Darkness
- Followed by: The Captives of Kaag

The Plague Lords of Ruel is the thirteenth book in the award-winning Lone Wolf book series created by Joe Dever. This is the first book in the "Grand Master" series, in which Lone Wolf founds a new order of the Kai. Starting from this book, the remaining books which were published in the US were abridged versions with a reduced number of sections.

== Gameplay ==
Lone Wolf books rely on a combination of thought and luck. Certain statistics such as combat skill and endurance attributes are determined randomly before play. The player is then allowed to choose Grandmaster Kai disciplines and a selection of Dessi and Crystal Star magics. This number depends directly on how many books in the series have been completed ("Grandmaster rank"). With each additional book completed, the player chooses one additional discipline. The Grandmaster series is different from any in the previous series of books because it gives Lone Wolf spells to use which grow more numerous as his Grandmaster Rank increases.

== Plot ==
After the events of the previous series of books, Lone Wolf has taken up training new Kai recruits, and under his tutelage, the Kai have been re-founded. Even though peace reigns for the moment, chaos is once again poised to unfold, as a group of Cenerese druids plot to unleash a massive plague upon all of Magnamund. Lone Wolf and the reader must find the source of this plague and destroy it before it can be released.
