= The Legacy of Vashna =

Book by Joe Dever

- American cover, original release
- Author: Joe Dever
- Illustrator: Brian Williams
- Cover artist: Peter Andrew Jones (UK); Dave Dorman (USA)
- Language: English
- Series: Lone Wolf
- Subject: Fantasy
- Genre: Children's literature
- Publisher: Red Fox (UK); Berkley / Pacer (USA)
- Publication date: 1991
- Publication place: United Kingdom
- Media type: Print (Paperback)
- ISBN: 0-425-13813-5
- OCLC: 28272538
- LC Class: MLC R CP00404
- Preceded by: The Darke Crusade
- Followed by: The Deathlord of Ixia

The Legacy of Vashna was the sixteenth book of the Lone Wolf book series written by Joe Dever and now illustrated by Brian Williams.

== Gameplay ==
Lone Wolf books rely on a combination of thought and luck. Certain statistics such as combat skill and endurance attributes are determined randomly before play. The player is then allowed to choose Grandmaster Kai disciplines and a selection of Dessi and Crystal Star magics. This number depends directly on how many books in the series have been completed ("Grandmaster rank"). With each additional book completed, the player chooses one additional discipline. The Grandmaster series is different from any in the previous series of books because it gives Lone Wolf spells to use which grow more numerous as his Grandmaster Rank increases.

== Plot ==
Long ago, Vashna, the greatest of all Darklords, was defeated in battle by King Ulnar of Sommerlund. But the victory was not complete, for while his body was destroyed, his spirit, as well as the spirits of his troops, remain trapped deep within the Maakengorge. Now, Lone Wolf learns of strange sightings in the area near the Maakengorge, suggesting that there may be a plot afoot to resurrect Vashna. Lone Wolf and the reader set out to uncover the nature of the threat, and to see if, indeed, Vashna will return.

This book saw the introduction of the demigoddess Alyss into the game book series from the graphic novels, where they met much earlier.
