= The Prisoners of Time =

Book by Joe Dever

- American cover, original release
- Author: Joe Dever
- Illustrator: Brian Williams
- Cover artist: Angus Fieldhouse (UK); Peter Andrew Jones (UK); Neal McPheeters (USA)
- Language: English
- Series: Lone Wolf
- Genre: Fantasy
- Publisher: Beaver Books (UK); Red Fox (UK); Berkley / Pacer (USA)
- Publication date: 1987
- Publication place: United Kingdom
- Media type: Print (Paperback)
- ISBN: 0-425-11568-2
- OCLC: 19637031
- Preceded by: The Dungeons of Torgar
- Followed by: The Masters of Darkness

The Prisoners of Time is the eleventh book in the Lone Wolf book series created by Joe Dever.

== Gameplay ==
Lone Wolf books rely on a combination of thought and luck. Certain statistics such as combat skill and endurance attributes are determined randomly before play (reading). The player is then allowed to choose which Magnakai disciplines or skills he or she possess. This number depends directly on how many books in the series have been completed ("Magnakai rank"). With each additional book completed, the player chooses one additional Magnakai discipline.

Like several of the previous books in the series, this book again suffers from relative linearity. Furthermore, there are a set of difficult battles near the end of the book which can make completing the book frustrating, particularly for those who are not carrying characters over from previous books (and thus do not have the advantage of additional Magnakai disciplines or ranks).

== Plot ==
Although Lone Wolf is successful in rescuing one of the captive Lorestones from Torgar, both he and the remaining two Lorestones are blasted through a dimensional portal (Shadow Gate) by Darklord Gnaag. After plummeting through the Shadow Gate, Lone Wolf finds himself trapped on the Daziarn Plane and must join strange allies and face old enemies if he hopes to make his way back from the Daziarn in time to save his homeland from destruction at the hands of the Darklords and their powerful new armies.
