= Mydnight's Hero =

Book by Joe Dever

- British cover, original release
- Author: Joe Dever
- Illustrator: Brian Williams
- Cover artist: Brian Williams
- Language: English
- Series: Lone Wolf
- Genre: Fantasy
- Publisher: Red Fox
- Publication date: 1995
- Publication place: United Kingdom
- Media type: Print (Paperback)
- Preceded by: The Buccaneers of Shadaki
- Followed by: Rune War

Mydnight's Hero is the twenty-third book of the award-winning Lone Wolf book series created by Joe Dever.

== Gameplay ==
Lone Wolf books rely on a combination of thought and luck. Certain statistics such as combat skill and endurance attributes are determined randomly before play (reading). The player is then allowed to choose which Kai disciplines or skills he or she possess. This number depends directly on how many books in the series have been completed ("Kai rank"). With each additional book completed, the player chooses one additional Kai discipline. In this first book, the player starts with five disciplines.
