= Voyage of the Moonstone =

1994 book by Joe Dever

- British cover, original release
- Author: Joe Dever
- Illustrator: Trevor Newton
- Cover artist: Brian Williams
- Language: English
- Series: Lone Wolf
- Genre: Fantasy
- Publisher: Red Fox
- Publication date: 1994
- Publication place: United Kingdom
- Media type: Print (Paperback)
- Preceded by: The Curse of Naar
- Followed by: The Buccaneers of Shadaki

Voyage of the Moonstone is the twenty-first book of the Lone Wolf book series created by Joe Dever. Trevor Newton illustrated this book instead of series regular Brian Williams.

== Gameplay ==
Lone Wolf books rely on a combination of thought and luck. Certain statistics such as combat skill and endurance attributes are determined randomly before play (reading). The player is then allowed to choose which Kai disciplines or skills he or she possess. This number depends directly on how many books in the series have been completed ("Kai rank"). With each additional book completed, the player chooses one additional Kai discipline. In this first book, the player starts with five disciplines.
