= The Jungle of Horrors =

Book by Joe Dever

- American cover, original release
- Author: Joe Dever
- Illustrator: Gary Chalk
- Cover artist: Peter Lyon (UK); Brian Salmon (UK); Peter Andrew Jones (UK); Neal McPheeters (USA)
- Language: English
- Series: Lone Wolf
- Genre: Fantasy
- Publisher: Beaver Books (UK); Red Fox (UK); Berkley / Pacer (USA)
- Publication date: 1987
- Publication place: United Kingdom
- Media type: Print (Paperback)
- ISBN: 0-425-10484-2
- OCLC: 17524568
- Preceded by: Castle Death
- Followed by: The Cauldron of Fear

The Jungle of Horrors is the eighth book in the award-winning Lone Wolf book series created by Joe Dever.

== Gameplay ==
Lone Wolf books rely on a combination of thought and luck. Certain statistics such as combat skill and endurance attributes are determined randomly before play (reading). The player is then allowed to choose which Magnakai disciplines or skills he or she possess. This number depends directly on how many books in the series have been completed ("Magnakai rank"). With each additional book completed, the player chooses one additional Magnakai discipline.

This book provides the player (reader) with a companion/guide named Paido, who accompanies the player through much of the book, in contrast to most of the other books which feature only solo adventures.

== Plot ==
After surviving the perils of Castle Death and being tutored by the Elder Magi, Lone Wolf and the reader now seek out the third Lorestone. The location of this Lorestone is thought to be hidden in a temple deep within a jungle-swamp known as the Danarg. Over the years, this fetid swamp has become the home for any number of evil creatures who seek to protect the jungle and its treasures. To make matters worse, news is delivered that the Darklords have united behind a new leader, and may soon again bring war to Magnamund, increasing Lone Wolf's sense of urgency.
