= Fire on the Water =

Second entry in the Lone Wolf gamebook series

- American cover, original release
- Author: Joe Dever
- Illustrator: Gary Chalk
- Cover artist: Gary Chalk (UK); Brian Salmon (UK); Peter Andrew Jones (UK) uncredited (USA)
- Language: English
- Series: Lone Wolf
- Genre: Fantasy
- Publisher: Sparrow Books (UK); Beaver Books (UK); Red Fox (UK); Berkley / Pacer (USA)
- Publication date: 1984
- Publication place: United Kingdom
- Media type: Print (Paperback)
- ISBN: 0-09-935900-6
- OCLC: 12464405
- Preceded by: Flight from the Dark
- Followed by: The Caverns of Kalte

Fire on the Water is the second installment in the award-winning Lone Wolf gamebook series created by Joe Dever. It is the installment where Lone Wolf receives the legendary Sommerswerd.

== Gameplay ==
In this second installment, the reader is allowed to choose an additional Kai Discipline if they completed Flight from the Dark, for a total of six Kai Disciplines. The reader also begins with a much better selection of equipment than previously available. This installment also introduces the 'Sommerswerd' - a divinely crafted weapon which grants bonuses to Combat Skill that are very useful, especially when used against undead enemies, in later installments.

== Plot ==
Having informed the King of Sommerlund about the fate of the Kai Order, Lone Wolf is instructed to make a journey to their ally, the neighbouring country of Durenor, to retrieve the legendary Sommerswerd, which is Sommerlund’s only hope at repelling Darklord Zagarna’s massive invasion. Lone Wolf is given the Seal of Hammerdal and sets off on a ship bound for Durenor, but when a traitor on board sabotages the ship, he is forced to make his way on foot to Durenor despite the enemies that await him around every corner.

== Reception ==
Marcus L. Rowland reviewed both Flight from the Dark and Fire on the Water together for White Dwarf #60, giving it an overall rating of 7 out of 10, and stated that "Both books are fair, emphasizing combat rather than traps and tricks. Those traps which are used can be anticipated, and usually by-passed or defused by use of Lone Wolf's skills."

The introduction of the Sommerswerd and its awesome power within the subsequent books made some fans question whether Joe Dever's intention of making every book accomplishable on its own still realistic. The plot and story of the book was greeted favorably by most readers, but a challenging section in the book referred to as the "Tunnel to Hammerdal Chokepoint" (along with the accompanying errata in some editions) detracted from the enjoyment of the book for some readers. This criticism was addressed and the text changed in the 2007 edition.

== See also ==
- Lone Wolf Gamebooks
- Magnamund
