= Castle Death =

1986 gamebook by Joe Dever

- American cover, original release
- Author: Joe Dever
- Illustrator: Gary Chalk
- Cover artist: Gary Chalk (UK); Peter Lyon (UK); Peter Elson (UK); Peter Andrew Jones (UK) uncredited (US)
- Language: English
- Series: Lone Wolf
- Genre: Children's Fantasy novel
- Publisher: Beaver Books (UK); Red Fox (UK); Berkley / Pacer (US)
- Publication date: 1986
- Publication place: United Kingdom
- Media type: Print (Paperback)
- ISBN: 0-425-10014-6
- OCLC: 16633138
- Preceded by: The Kingdoms of Terror
- Followed by: The Jungle of Horrors

Castle Death is the seventh book in the Lone Wolf book series created by Joe Dever.

== Gameplay ==
Lone Wolf books rely on a combination of thought and luck. Certain statistics such as combat skill and endurance attributes are determined randomly before play (reading). The player is then allowed to choose which Magnakai disciplines or skills he or she possess. This number depends directly on how many books in the series have been completed ("Magnakai rank"). With each additional book completed, the player chooses one additional Magnakai discipline.

== Plot ==
In his quest to attain Kai Grand Master status, Lone Wolf must seek out and find 7 Lorestones. After obtaining the Lorestone of Varetta in the previous book and absorbing its wisdom and power, the location of the next Lorestone is revealed as the remote township of Herdos. Here, Lone Wolf is directed by friendly Elder Magi to search within the accursed fortress of Kazan-Oud, otherwise known as "Castle Death".
