= Rune War =

1995 book by Joe Dever

- British cover, original release
- Author: Joe Dever
- Illustrator: Brian Williams
- Cover artist: Brian Williams
- Language: English
- Series: Lone Wolf
- Genre: Fantasy
- Publisher: Red Fox
- Publication date: 1995
- Publication place: United Kingdom
- Media type: Print (Paperback)
- Preceded by: Mydnight's Hero
- Followed by: Trail of the Wolf

Rune War is the twenty-fourth book of the award-winning Lone Wolf book series created by Joe Dever.

== Gameplay ==
Lone Wolf books rely on a combination of thought and luck. Certain statistics such as combat skill and endurance attributes are determined randomly before play (reading). The player is then allowed to choose which Kai disciplines or skills he or she possess. This number depends directly on how many books in the series have been completed ("Kai rank"). With each additional book completed, the player chooses one additional Kai discipline. In this first book, the player starts with five disciplines.

== Reception ==
Chris Read reviewed Rune War for Arcane magazine, rating it a 6 out of 10 overall. Read comments that "the book is nicely illustrated and the narrative is generally good with plenty of decision-making and 'interaction' with NPCs. Naturally, Lady Luck plays her fickle part, but your skills and common sense are much more relevant to your success. This, above all, gives the book a good feel."
