= Trail of the Wolf =

1997 gamebook by Joe Dever

- Author: Joe Dever
- Illustrator: Brian Williams
- Cover artist: Brian Williams
- Language: English
- Series: Lone Wolf
- Genre: Fantasy
- Publisher: Red Fox
- Publication date: 1997
- Publication place: United Kingdom
- Media type: Print (Paperback)
- Preceded by: Rune War
- Followed by: The Fall of Blood Mountain

Trail of the Wolf is the twenty-fifth book of the Lone Wolf book series created by Joe Dever.

== Gameplay ==
Lone Wolf books rely on a combination of thought and luck. Certain statistics such as combat skill and endurance attributes are determined randomly before play (reading). The player is then allowed to choose which Kai disciplines or skills he or she possess. This number depends directly on how many books in the series have been completed ("Kai rank"). With each additional book completed, the player chooses one additional Kai discipline. In this first book, the player starts with five disciplines.
