= The Hunger of Sejanoz =

1998 book by Joe Dever

- British cover, original release
- Author: Joe Dever
- Illustrator: Brian Williams
- Cover artist: Brian Williams
- Language: English
- Series: Lone Wolf
- Genre: Fantasy
- Publisher: Red Fox
- Publication date: 1998
- Publication place: United Kingdom
- Media type: Print (Paperback)
- ISBN: 0-09-964221-2
- OCLC: 60169338
- Preceded by: Vampirium
- Followed by: The Storms of Chai

The Hunger of Sejanoz is a gamebook by Joe Dever. It is the twenty-eighth book of the award-winning Lone Wolf book series. It was the last book to be released in the New Order series for the next eighteen years as the 29th book of the series, The Storms of Chai, was published in 2016. To have this book published in 1998, Joe Dever was forced into an uncomfortable compromise – the publisher would only print the book if it contained 300 sections.
