= Lone Wolf: The Roleplaying Game =

Lone Wolf: The Roleplaying Game is a role-playing game published by Mongoose Publishing in 2005.

== Description ==
Lone Wolf: The Roleplaying Game is based on the Lone Wolf series of gamebooks. It is set in the world of Magnamund and takes place fifty years prior to the events of Flight from the Dark, the first book in the series.

== Publication history ==
Lone Wolf: The Roleplaying Game (2004–2005) was one of several Open Game License games inspired by the d20 System that Mongoose Publishing published between 2003 and 2006. Mongoose also produced their own miniatures for their games, including Lone Wolf.

== Reviews ==
- Backstab #49
