= Joe Dever =

British writer and game designer (1956–2016)

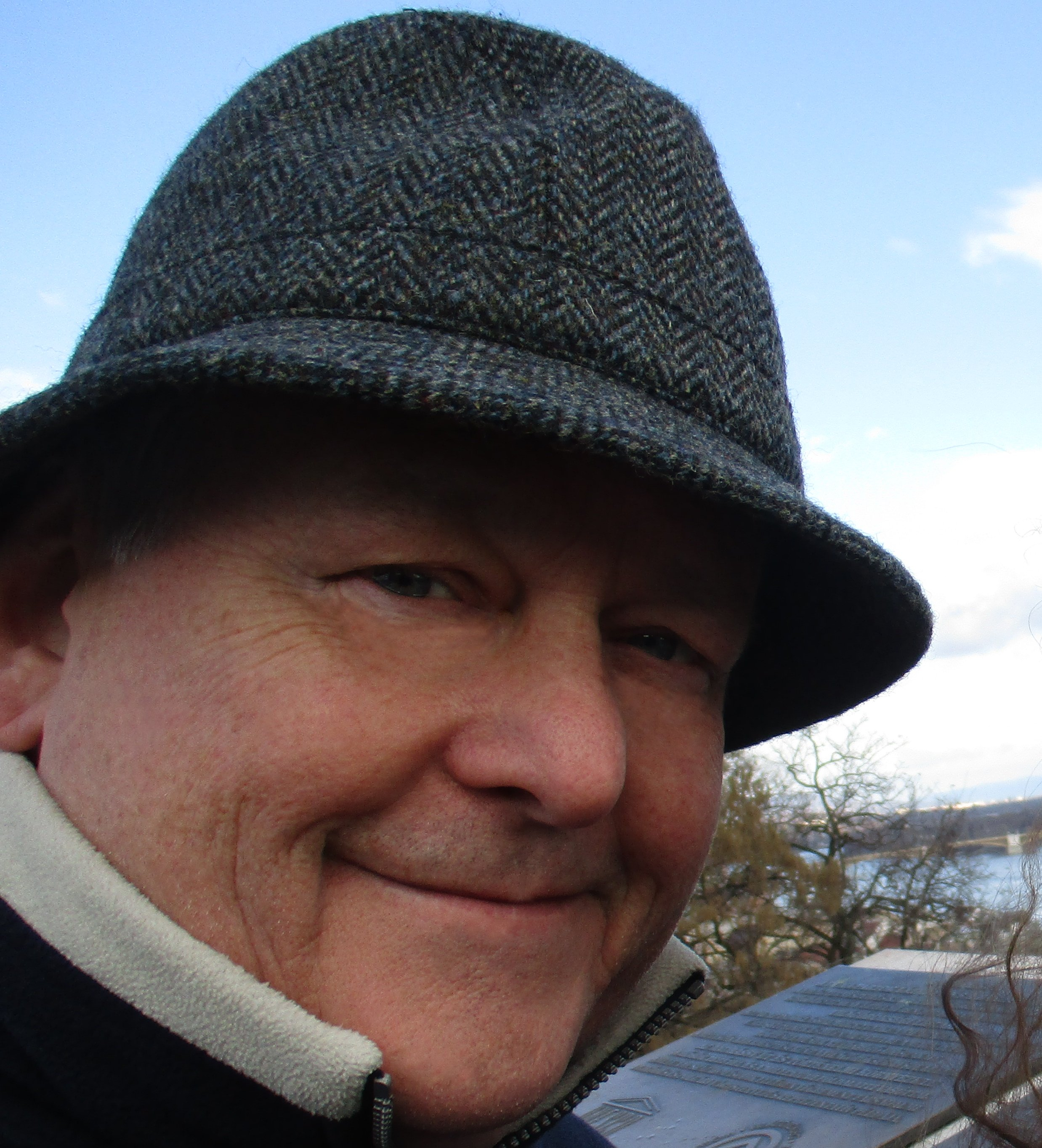
- Dever in 2016
- Born: 12 February 1956; Chingford, England
- Died: 29 November 2016 (aged 60)
- Resting place: Roding Lane Cemetery (Woodford, England)
- Occupations: Author, game designer
- Writing career
- Genres: Fantasy, science fiction
- Notable work: Lone Wolf

Joseph Robert Dever (12 February 1956 – 29 November 2016), known professionally as Joe Dever, was an English fantasy author and game designer. Originally a musician, Dever became the first British winner of the Advanced Dungeons & Dragons Championship of America in 1982.

He first created the fictional world of Magnamund in 1977 as a setting for his Dungeons & Dragons campaigns. In 1984, he released the first book of the Lone Wolf series of young-adult gamebooks, and the series has since sold over 11.5 million copies worldwide (as of September 2014). He experienced difficulty with his publishers as the game books market began to contract in 1995, until publication ceased in 1998 before the final four books (numbers 29–32) were released. Since 2003, the series enjoyed a revival of interest, particularly in France, Italy, Germany, Sweden, the Czech Republic and Poland following the re-release of the gamebook series in these countries.

From 1996 onwards, Dever had been involved in the design and production of several successful computer and console games. He also contributed to Lone Wolf: The Roleplaying Game, a Dungeons & Dragons-style roleplaying game for Lone Wolf published by Mongoose Publishing (UK) from 2004 to 2013 and Le Grimoire (France) in 2006–2013. In 2013, he wrote the story and in-game text for the Joe Dever's Lone Wolf video game series specifically designed for tablets and smartphones. Entitled Lone Wolf: Blood on the Snow, it was developed by Forge Reply (Milan, Italy) and published by BulkyPix. In February 2014, it won two Golden Dragon Awards from the Italian Video Game Developer's Association of Italy (AESVI) for Best Game Design and Best Indie Game of the Year 2013. In April 2014, it was a finalist in the Develop Industry Excellence Awards. On 27 November 2014, it was released via Steam for PC and Mac computers. On 11 January 2016, the developer Forge Reply announced that Joe Dever's Lone Wolf had achieved 2.5 million downloads since its release in November 2013.

At the time of his death, Dever was authoring supplements for the Lone Wolf Adventure Game with Cubicle 7 Entertainment Ltd., and writing the final books in the core Lone Wolf series. Following his death, his son Ben announced that his family would work to publish the remaining three books of the saga.

== Biography ==
Dever was born in Chingford and educated at Buckhurst Hill County High School. In 1976, he joined the studio-based orchestra of a record company in London known as Pye Records which provided accompaniment to prominent solo singers and artists. After 18 months, the orchestra disbanded and Dever then freelanced for a year before joining Virgin Records as a recording engineer based at Manor Studios in Oxfordshire. Dever has two children, Ben (b. 1981) and Sophie (b. 1987).

Dever was a bass guitar player and attempted to get a record deal when playing with Essex-based band Seventh Seal. This led to him getting involved with John Lydon's band Public Image Ltd; Dever acted as the band's road manager and tour manager when it toured in Europe.

He was also an enthusiastic wargamer with an extensive collection of both 15 mm and 25 mm metal miniatures, of which he had painted the vast majority.

During June–August 2005, Dever underwent extensive surgery for bi-lateral kidney cancer, involving a partial nephrectomy of the right kidney, and a full nephrectomy of the left kidney. Seventy percent of his remaining kidney was saved. The surgical team was directed by J. L. Peters of Whipps Cross University Hospital in London. It proceeded without complications on 10 August 2005, and subsequently Dever made a swift recovery, having retained sufficient kidney function to lead a normal life without any need for dialysis.

In August 2016, Dever underwent a bile duct surgery which caused side effects. In late October, he announced his admission to hospital for a series of treatment to correct these complications. He died on 29 November 2016, following those complications.

== Writings ==
Joe Dever was seven years old when he became a fan of the comic strip "The Rise and Fall of the Trigan Empire" which appeared in a magazine called Look and Learn. He also built up armies of Airfix Roman soldiers and converted their spears to laser rifles long before he was introduced to fantasy. Dever was first introduced to "science fantasy" in 1970 by his Grammar school English tutor. He was the first and perhaps only British person to compete in the Advanced Dungeons & Dragons Championship of America, which he won in 1982.

Dever originally developed the fantasy world of Magnamund in 1975, and in 1977 he began using it as the setting for his Dungeons & Dragons campaigns. Originally called "Chinaraux", at first the world consisted of only the northern continent of Magnamund. The story is based around Lone Wolf, who is a young cadet in a monastic order of warriors known as the Kai Lords who defend their home of Sommerlund from the forces of evil, embodied by the Darklords of Helgedad. After a surprise invasion, all of the Kai are massacred and only Lone Wolf survives the final battle. The rest of the book series follows Lone Wolf and, later, his successor in their attempts to take revenge on the Darklords and then to thwart the plans of Dark God Naar to control their world for evil.

== Production ==
=== Original publication ===
Lone Wolf was originally meant to be published as a role-playing game system for Games Workshop, before Dever negotiated a better deal from Beaver Books, an imprint of Hutchinson Publishing Ltd., and released it as a connected series of solo gamebooks. Dever was originally contracted by this London-based publisher Hutchinson to write four books, but he had already planned for there to be twenty in the series. The first two books in the gamebook series were published simultaneously in July 1984. They sold in excess of 100,000 copies in the first week of release. Subsequently, the Lone Wolf series has been published in over 30 countries, translated into 18 languages, and has sold in excess of 12 million copies to date. The series was awarded the Gamemaster International "All Time Great" award in 1991 and also won "Game Book of the Year" awards in 1985, 1986 and 1987.

With the help of Joe Dever, Paul Barnett (pen name John Grant) wrote twelve novelizations of the Lone Wolf books known as the Legends of Lone Wolf, several of which were heavily edited before publication. In 2004, the Italian publisher Gruppo Armenia (Milan) reprinted all 12 novels in 5 volumes of anthology. Random House ceased publishing the novelizations when "the books weren't selling". Dever has stated that as the game books precede the novelizations chronologically, they are the "authoritative" versions. He also developed the character Grey Star, and a sub-series of four gamebooks were written by Ian Page using this principal character (according to a 2008 interview with Joe Dever, Grey Star was Ian Page's player character in Dever's Dungeons & Dragons campaign, and Dever convinced Page to write game books using this detailed character and his background).

Only the first four volumes of the Legends of Lone Wolf were made available in the United States (though Sword of the Sun was divided into two separate volumes, The Tides of Treachery and Sword of the Sun), and only the first 20 of the Lone Wolf gamebook series were printed in the United States. The American editions of books 13–20 were abridged versions and are shorter than the UK editions which have colour maps. In The Magnamund Companion, all the countries of the Lone Wolf world are described in some detail, as are Lone Wolf's main enemies – the Darklords of Helgedad – and their Giak language. There is also a Ragadorn Tavern Board Game, and a solo adventure where you play as Banedon the Magician.

The later 'New Order' Lone Wolf gamebooks (no.s 21–28) were printed in the UK in smaller volumes than the earlier editions, and have subsequently become highly sought after by readers eager to complete their original Lone Wolf collections. Copies of these scarce titles regularly sell for over US$100 each on the internet auction site eBay. Publisher Red Fox ceased publishing the Lone Wolf series in 1998 after book 28, The Hunger of Sejanoz, citing fading interest in the interactive gaming genre, despite hundreds of requests for the reprinting of several Lone Wolf books that had gone out of print. It would be the last original Lone Wolf book for the next 18 years.

Between 1990 and 2011, four scripts were developed of Lone Wolf for a potential film release, but did not proceed beyond the pre-production phase.

=== Republication ===
In 1999, Dever gave his permission for the Lone Wolf books, numbers one through twenty, to be published for free on the internet by the non-profit organization Project Aon. Joe Dever later gave his permission to publish the New Order series and The Magnamund Companion. In July 2014, on the 30th anniversary of the first publication of Flight from the Dark, the 28th book in his Lone Wolf series was released online by Project Aon. The World of Lone Wolf series, The Magnamund Companion and several other Lone Wolf related written works are also available for free download from this site.

Mongoose Publishing reprinted the original Lone Wolf gamebooks in collector hardcover volumes beginning in 2007. The first of the new Lone Wolf Collector's Editions, Flight from the Dark, was thoroughly revised and expanded by Dever with the addition of two hundred new sections. It was shortlisted for the 2008 Origins Fiction Award (Academy of Adventure Gaming Arts & Design). In April 2010, the German language translation (Einsamer Wolf: Flucht aus dem Dunkel) won the Best Fantasy Gamebook Award at the RPC Event in Cologne, Germany.

Mongoose also arranged to publish Lone Wolf through its originally intended full 32-book arc as Dever wanted, as the original series had only gone through 28 books. The first seventeen books in this series were published by Mongoose Publishing before it was announced that the company had lost the license to publish the Lone Wolf line on 27 February 2013. Shortly after this, it was announced that German publisher, Mantikore-Verlag, had acquired the rights to continue publishing the Collector series hardcovers in English from book 18 to 28. On 1 April 2015, it was announced that book 29, The Storms of Chai, would be published for the first time in the fall of 2015 in both Italian and English. However, after the 22nd book in the series, The Buccaneers of Shadaki, was published in September 2015, Mantikore-Verlag lost the publishing rights of the series. Without a publisher, the English version of The Storms of Chai would have to wait while its Italian version was published on 29 October 2015.

On 1 December 2015, Cubicle 7 Entertainment Ltd acquired the license to publish the Lone Wolf Gamebooks from Mantikore-Verlag, pushing the publication of book 29 in English to spring 2016. However, on 29 January 2016 Cubicle 7 announced that they had come back on their decision and that they would not publish the Lone Wolf series of gamebooks. On 1 April 2016, Joe Dever announced that he would publish the remaining Lone Wolf's books himself with his own imprint, Holmgard Press, starting with the publication of book 29 later the same month, which was finally released on 12 May 2016.

On 4 March 2016, at the Mantova Comics & Games Show (Mantova, Italy), Dever announced that the Italian edition of Lone Wolf 30, Dead in the Deep was scheduled for publication at the Lucca Comics & Games Show 2016, but his ill health and untimely death prevented this. Following his death, his son Ben announced that his family would work to publish the remaining three books of the saga. The first two books, Dead in the Deep and The Dusk of Eternal Night, were published in 2019 and 2020 respectively and were written by Ben Dever and Vincent Lazzari, based on Joe Dever's notes. The last story of the series, Light of the Kai, will be divided into two volumes: the first one was released in 2026 while no publication date has been announced yet for the second book.

Since 2022, Holmgard Press has started republishing the whole series as a "Definitive Edition" which aims the mass market, with newly revised version of the books. As of August 2026, the first twenty books have been republished, along with book 32.

On 1 November 2015, Dever was awarded a plaque on the Lucca 'Walk of Fame' (Lucca – Tuscany, Italy) for his writing and games design. He also received a Lifetime Achievement Award from the organisers of the Lucca Comics & Games Show.

On 14 January 2016, French Publisher Gallimard Jeunesse announced that their Loup Solitaire editions have sold in excess of 2.8 million copies since first publication in 1986. They have remained constantly in print in France for the past 30 years. The French edition of Loup Solitaire 31 was published in 2025.

== Other creations ==
In addition to Lone Wolf, Dever has also created two other role-playing gamebook series (Freeway Warrior and Combat Heroes) and designed several best-selling computer and video games for PCs and consoles. The Freeway Warrior series of gamebooks are set in a post-apocalyptic, Mad Max-like world. The series was revived in Italy in October 2015 and the first book was published on 29 October and the second book was published on 3 March 2016. The Combat Heroes gamebooks are illustrated adventures where each paragraph is a full-page picture representing what the player sees, with two modes. Alone, the aim is to escape from a maze. In one-on-one play, two players are duelling in a maze. Each player has a different book; at a given page, the illustration shows an empty corridor; when the other character is in sight (i.e. the players read given page numbers), the player has to turn to another page showing the other opponent's position in the corridor. Combat is then resolved before the game continues.

Among Dever's many video game contributions is the best-selling Killzone game for which he wrote the backstory and created the principal characters.

== Bibliography ==
=== Lone Wolf ===
- Lone Wolf 1 – Flight from the Dark (1984) – Revised version (2022)
- Lone Wolf 1 – Flight from the Dark, Extended version (2007) – Revised version (2022)
- Lone Wolf 2 – Fire on the Water (1984) – Revised versions (2007, 2022)
- Lone Wolf 3 – The Caverns of Kalte (1984) – Revised versions (2007, 2022)
- Lone Wolf 4 – The Chasm of Doom (1985) – Revised versions (2008, 2022)
- Lone Wolf 5 – Shadow on the Sand (1985) – Revised versions (2008, 2022)
- Lone Wolf 6 – The Kingdoms of Terror (1985) – Revised version (2008)
- Lone Wolf 7 – Castle Death (1986) – Revised version (2008)
- Lone Wolf 8 – The Jungle of Horrors (1987) – Revised version (2008)
- Lone Wolf 9 – The Cauldron of Fear (1987) – Revised version (2009)
- Lone Wolf 10 – The Dungeons of Torgar (1987) – Revised version (2009)
- Lone Wolf 11 – The Prisoners of Time (1987) – Revised version (2009)
- Lone Wolf 12 – The Masters of Darkness (1988) – Revised version (2009)
- Lone Wolf 13 – The Plague Lords of Ruel (1990) – Revised version (2009)
- Lone Wolf 14 – The Captives of Kaag (1990) – Revised version (2010)
- Lone Wolf 15 – The Darke Crusade (1991) – Revised version (2011)
- Lone Wolf 16 – The Legacy of Vashna (1991) – Revised version (2011)
- Lone Wolf 17 – The Deathlord of Ixia (1992) – Revised version (2012)
- Lone Wolf 18 – Dawn of the Dragons (1992) – Revised version (2013)
- Lone Wolf 19 – Wolf's Bane (1993) – Revised version (2013)
- Lone Wolf 20 – The Curse of Naar (1993) – Revised version (2014)
- Lone Wolf 21 – Voyage of the Moonstone (1994) – Revised version (2015)
- Lone Wolf 22 – The Buccaneers of Shadaki (1995) – Revised version (2015)
- Lone Wolf 23 – Mydnight's Hero (1995) – Revised version (2019)
- Lone Wolf 24 – Rune War (1996) – Revised version (2019)
- Lone Wolf 25 – Trail of the Wolf (1996) – Revised version (2020)
- Lone Wolf 26 – The Fall of Blood Mountain (1997) – Revised version (2020)
- Lone Wolf 27 – Vampirium (1997) - Revised version (2021)
- Lone Wolf 28 – The Hunger of Sejanoz (1998) – Extended version^{†} (2022)
- Lone Wolf 29 – The Storms of Chai (Italy 2015 / UK 2016)
- Lone Wolf 30 – Dead in the Deep^{†} (Italy 2018 / UK 2019)
- Lone Wolf 31 – The Dusk of Eternal Night^{†} (2020)
- Lone Wolf 32 – Light of the Kai, Volume 1^{†} (2026)
- Lone Wolf 33 – Light of the Kai, Volume 2^{†} (TBA)

† Written by Vincent Lazzari and Ben Dever, based on a story by Joe Dever.

=== Companion Book ===
- The Magnamund Companion (1986)

=== Freeway Warrior ===
- Freeway Warrior 1: Highway Holocaust (1988)
- Freeway Warrior 2: Slaughter Mountain Run (1988)
- Freeway Warrior 3: The Omega Zone (1989)
- Freeway Warrior 4: California Countdown (1989)

=== Combat Heroes ===
- Combat Heroes 1: White Warlord (1986)
- Combat Heroes 1: Black Baron (1986)
- Combat Heroes 2: Scarlet Sorcerer (1987)
- Combat Heroes 2: Emerald Enchanter (1987)

=== The World of Lone Wolf ===
- World of Lone Wolf 1: Grey Star the Wizard (written by Ian page; edited by Joe Dever – 1985)
- World of Lone Wolf 2: The Forbidden City (written by Ian page; edited by Joe Dever – 1985)
- World of Lone Wolf 3: Beyond the Nightmare Gate (written by Ian page; edited by Joe Dever – 1985)
- World of Lone Wolf 4: War of the Wizards (written by Ian page; edited by Joe Dever – 1986)

=== Legends of Lone Wolf ===
- Legends of Lone Wolf 1: Eclipse of the Kai (co-authored with John Grant – 1989)
- Legends of Lone Wolf 2: The Dark Door Opens (co-authored with John Grant – 1989)
- Legends of Lone Wolf 3: The Sword of the Sun (co-authored with John Grant – 1989)
- Legends of Lone Wolf 4: Hunting Wolf (co-authored with John Grant – 1990)
- Legends of Lone Wolf 5: The Claws of Helgedad (co-authored with John Grant – 1991)
- Legends of Lone Wolf 6: The Sacrifice of Ruanon (co-authored with John Grant – 1991)
- Legends of Lone Wolf 7: The Birthplace (co-authored with John Grant – 1992)
- Legends of Lone Wolf 8: The Book of the Magnakai (co-authored with John Grant – 1992)
- Legends of Lone Wolf 9: The Tellings (co-authored with John Grant – 1993)
- Legends of Lone Wolf 10: The Lorestone of Varetta (co-authored with John Grant – 1993)
- Legends of Lone Wolf 11: The Secret of Kazan-Oud (co-authored with John Grant – 1994)
- Legends of Lone Wolf 12: The Rotting Land (co-authored with John Grant – 1994)

Book 3, The Sword of the Sun, was split into two smaller volumes by Berkley in the US: The Tides of Treachery and The Sword of the Sun.

=== Chronicles of Magnamund ===
- The Lencian Trilogy 1: The Dragons of Lencia (co-authored with Richard Ford – 2008)
- The Lencian Trilogy 2: The Shadow & the Skull (TBA)
- The Lencian Trilogy 3: untitled (TBA)
- Rise of the Agarashi 1: Glory & Greed (co-authored with August Hahn – 2008)
- Rise of the Agarashi 2: Sand & Sorrow (TBA)
- Rise of the Agarashi 3: Triumph & Tragedy (TBA)

=== Lone Wolf Multi-player Gamebook System ===
First published by Mongoose Publishing

- Lone Wolf Multi-player Gamebook Rules (with Matthew Sprange – 2010)
- Heroes of Magnamund (with Matthew Sprange – 2010)
- Terror of the Darklords (with Pete Nash – 2010)
- Sommerlund (with Darren Pearce – 2010)
- The Magnamund Bestiary (with Darren Pearce – 2011)
- Book of the Magnakai (with August Hahn – 2011)
- Corruption of Ikaya (with Mark Gedak – 2011)
- The Darklands (with Vincent Lazzari – 2011)
- Stornlands 1 (with Vincent Lazzari, Florent Haro, Eric Dubourg, Emmanuel Luc, Gerald Degryse – 2012)

Mongoose Publishing lost their license to publish Lone Wolf on 27 February 2013.

=== Lone Wolf Adventure Game (LWAG) ===
Cubicle 7 Entertainment Ltd., announced in early March 2013 that it had secured the rights to develop a new Lone Wolf roleplaying game entitled "The Lone Wolf Adventure Game" in conjunction with Dever. Following a successful Kickstarter campaign August–September 2014, the new RPG was launched at Gen Con 2015 (Indianapolis USA) in late July / early August 2015. It went on general sale worldwide in September 2015. The Italian language version was published on 29 October 2015. On 7 March 2016, Dever's Lone Wolf Adventure Game was nominated for 'Game of the Year' and 'Best Art & Presentation' in the prestigious Golden Geek Awards. On 14 April 2016 it was nominated for 'Best RPG of the Year' in the Origins Awards (Academy of Adventure Gaming Arts & Design) for 2016.

- Lone Wolf Adventure Game (Joe Dever with Cubicle 7 Entertainment Ltd. – 2015)
- The Heroes of Magnamund (Joe Dever and August Hahn; additional writing by Vincent Lazzari, Andrew Kenrick and John E Murray – 2016)
- Adventures of the Kai (Joe Dever, August Hahn, Andrew Kenrick, Vincent Lazzari, Andrew Peregrine and Ken Spencer – 2016)
- Magnamund Menagerie (Joe Dever, Vincent Lazzari and Darren Pearce – 2017)
- Bestiary of the Beyond (Joe Dever, Vincent Lazzari, August Hahn and Darren Pearce – 2017)
- Terror of the Darklords (Joe Dever, August Hahn, Vincent Lazzari, Pete Nash and Ken Spencer – 2017)

=== Graphic novels ===
- Lone Wolf Graphic Novel: The Skull of Agarash (1994)

=== "PhoneQuest" Interactive Telephone Adventures ===
- Lone Wolf: The Forbidden Tower (1989)
- Alien Intruder (1990)
- Ninja (1990)
- Tomb of the Sphinx (1990)
- Vampire Hunter (1990)
- Lone Wolf: The Fortress of Doom (1991)

=== Lone Wolf Audiobooks ===
- Eclipse of the Kai (1992)
- The Dark Door Opens (1993)

=== Lone Wolf Maps of Magnamund ===
- The World of Magnamund poster map (with Francesco Mattioli – 2011)

The Maps of Magnamund Collection:

- Set 1: Sommerlund, Durenor, Vassagonia, Dessi (with Francesco Mattioli – 2012)
- Set 2: Kakush and Valerion, The Galdonlands, The Stornlands, Talestria (with Francesco Mattioli – 2013)
- Set 3: Bor & the Hammerlands, Lencia, the Drakkarim Homelands & the Hellswamp, Ixia & the Hardlands (with Francesco Mattioli – 2014)
- Set 4: Eastern Darklands, Central Darklands and Skaror, Western Darklands, Eastern Kalte (with Francesco Mattioli – 2015)
- Set 5: Northern Shadaki, Central Shadaki, Southern Shadaki, Shadakine Occupied Territories (with Francesco Mattioli – 2015)
- Set 6: Taklakot & Andui, Lissan, Chai, Bhanar (with Francesco Mattioli – 2015)
- Set 7: Eastern Vaduzhan & Mythan, Western Vaduzhan, Telchos, Cincoria & Klanos (with Francesco Mattioli – 2015)
- Set 8: Kasland; Starn, Boden & Ilion; Central Tentarias; Midsea & Eastern Tentarias (with Francesco Mattioli – 2016)
- Set 9: Siyen; Lunarlia, Siyen & Naaros; Kaum, Halia & Lunarlia; Southern Lunaria & The Kelderwastes (with Francesco Mattioli – TBA)
- Set 10: Northern Sadi Desert; Southern Sadi Desert; Southern Kalte & Northern Darklands; Southeastern Kalte & Northeastern Darklands (with Francesco Mattioli – TBA)

=== Computer and video game design ===
- E-Scape (1996)
- Corazon (1997)
- Nightlong: Union City Conspiracy (1999)
- Flåklypa Grand Prix (2000)
- Flying Circus (2000)
- Wheelie (2001)
- Top Down (2001)
- Desert Gunner (2001)
- Speedboat Racer (2001)
- RVO Mech (2002)
- Ground Control II (2003)
- 2 Fast 2 Furious (mobile phone edition, 2005)
- Lone Wolf: Blood on the Snow (tablet and smartphone game, 2013)
- Lone Wolf: Forest Hunt (tablet and smartphone game, 2014)
- Lone Wolf: The Shianti Halls (tablet and smartphone game, 2014)
- Lone Wolf: Dawn over V'taag (tablet and smartphone game, 2014)
- Joe Dever's Lone Wolf HD Remastered (for PC's & Mac Computers, 2014)

=== Wargaming ===
- Mega Wargames (photography, 2013)

== Reference bibliography ==
- 'Joe Dever', The Daily Telegraph, Thursday 8 December 2016, p. 27
- "Joe Dever, creator of Lone Wolf 'choose-your-own-adventure' gamebooks – obituary". The Telegraph (Only available by Premium subscription ed.). 8 December 2016.
