= Lone Wolf (gamebooks) =

Fantasy gamebook series, from 1984

- Series logo from Mongoose publishing
- Author: Joe Dever, Ben Dever and Vincent Lazzari
- Illustrator: Various, including Gary Chalk (First edition of books 1 to 8)
- Country: United Kingdom
- Language: English
- Genre: Fantasy
- Publisher: Hutchinson Publishing Group Sparrow Books, Beaver Books; Random House, Red Fox imprint; Mongoose Publishing; Mantikore-Verlag; Holmgard Press (self-publishing)
- Published: 1984 - current
- Media type: print
- No. of books: 31

Lone Wolf is a series currently consisting of 32 gamebooks, created by Joe Dever and initially illustrated (books 1–8) by Gary Chalk. Dever wrote the first 29 books of the series before his son Ben, with help from French author Vincent Lazzari, took over writing duty upon his father's death. The first book was published in July 1984 and the series has sold more than 12 million copies worldwide.

The story focuses on the fictional world of Magnamund, where the forces of good and evil are fighting for control. The main protagonist is Lone Wolf, last of his caste of warrior monks known as Kai Lords, although in latter books the focus shifts on one of his pupils as the main character. The book series is written in the second person and recounts Lone Wolf's adventures as if the reader is the main character.

== Original publication (1984–1998) ==
=== Development and popularization ===
Joe Dever was seven years old when he became a fan of the British comic series The Rise and Fall of the Trigan Empire, which appeared in the magazine Look and Learn. He built armies of Airfix Roman soldiers and converted their spears to laser rifles, long before he was introduced to fantasy. Dever was introduced to "science fantasy" by his high school English tutor. He was the first and possibly only British person to compete in the Advanced Dungeons and Dragons Championship of America, which he won in 1982.

Dever has stated that his earliest inspirations for Lone Wolf were medieval classical texts such as Beowulf, Gawain and the Green Knight and Le Morte d'Arthur. In his teenage years Tolkien, Moorcock and Mervyn Peake along with military history and Norse mythology all contributed to the creation of the Kai. He also used travel books to discover images of "exotic places".

Dever developed the world of Magnamund from 1975 to 1983 as a setting for his Dungeons & Dragons campaigns. Originally called "Chinaraux", the world consisted of only northern Magnamund. The Kai lords are like "psionic rangers with special powers bestowed upon them by their gods". An individual book took 9 weeks to write, with three for mapping and plotting, and then 6 weeks of writing the story, creating an average of 12 entries per day.

Dever was originally contracted by London-based publisher Hutchinsons for four books, despite having planned out at least 13 for the series. When the first books proved to be popular, Dever was allowed an extension of contract and went on to write 20 books with Lone Wolf as the main hero, and 8 more featuring a new Kai Lord. He also developed the character Grey Star during this period, and four books were written using this character by Ian Page.

Dever also wrote The Magnamund Companion, in which all countries of the Lone Wolf world are described in some detail; readers are also given details on the Darklords and a trainer course in the Giak language. There are two games included, a Ragadorn Tavern Board game, and a short solo adventure that takes place immediately prior to book one, putting the player in the role of Banedon, a young magician who goes on to become a recurring character in the Lone Wolf books.

=== Novelizations and canon problem ===
With the help of Joe Dever, Paul Barnett, whose pen name is John Grant, wrote twelve novelizations of the Lone Wolf books known as the Legends of Lone Wolf, several of which were heavily edited before publication. They have received mixed reviews from fans. Barnett was the creator of the characters Alyss, Qinefer, and Thog. Random House stopped publishing the novelizations after the twelfth book because "the books weren't selling," though the truth of this statement is contested. Barnett entered discussions with an Italian publisher about reprinting the books unedited in Italian, this finally occurring with some editing of the original text. In July 2009, he announced on his blog that Dark Quest Books would republish an upgraded version of the series in English beginning in 2010. Only three omnibuses, containing the first eight novels, were released before the publisher ceased operation in the second half of 2016.

There has long been uncertainty amongst fans as to which version of the series is canon. Joe Dever has stated that as the game books precede the novelization, they are the "authoritative" versions. There is still some cross over between the novelizations and the gamebooks, however; most notably in the form of Alyss, an original character of John Grant's who plays a significant role in the final books of the Grand Master series.

Only the first four volumes of the Legends of Lone Wolf were made available in the United States (though Sword of the Sun was divided into two separate volumes, The Tides of Treachery and Sword of the Sun).

=== Decline of the genre, launch of Project Aon ===
During the latter period of writing, Joe Dever and publisher Red Fox were at odds, and Red Fox ceased publishing the Lone Wolf series after book 28, The Hunger of Sejanoz, citing lack of interest in the interactive gaming genre, despite hundreds of requests for the reprinting of several Lone Wolf books that had gone out of print. This left the series unfinished, as Dever had 4 other books planned. He first did plan on releasing these books in some form after completing his collaboration on the new Lone Wolf RPG.

In the United States, only the first 20 of the core Lone Wolf gamebook series were made available, the last 8 books were never printed in the US. It should also be noted that the American editions of books 13–20 were abridged versions and thus are shorter than the UK editions. The original colour maps were also rendered in black and white for these books.

Although the series ceased publication and went out of print in 1998, a fan-operated organisation called Project Aon was established in 1999 which has subsequently converted many of the books to HTML format. Joe Dever first gave his permission for Project Aon to distribute the Lone Wolf books (1 to 20) online via the internet before eventually also giving the rights for the New Order series (21 to 28). However, a strong interest in Lone Wolf outside the English-speaking world, particularly in Italy, Spain, and France where the books were republished between 2002 and 2006, still existed.

As of December 2020, 29 of the 31 Lone Wolf gamebooks, the World of Lone Wolf series, the Magnamund Companion, and several other Lone Wolf related written works are available for download on the Project Aon website.

== Republication and expansion (since 2007) ==
=== The Collector's Edition ===
In 2007, Joe Dever announced that a revised and expanded version of the original series, called the Collector's Edition, would be published. Plans were also made to publish the final four books of the series for the very first time. However, several issues led the author to transfer the rights to various publishers over the years, with each publisher only releasing a part of the series.

==== Mongoose Publishing (2007–2013) ====
In 2007, Mongoose Publishing, editor of the Lone Wolf RPG, announced that the Lone Wolf books were going to be printed again. Mongoose Publishing planned to publish all the original 28 gamebooks of the series plus four new ones that were originally outlined by Joe Dever before the cancellation of the series by the end of 1990s. Mongoose republished 17 of the gamebooks from July 2007 to February 2013 before the termination of the partnership with the author.

==== Mantikore-Verlag (2013–2015) ====
In February 2013, after Mongoose had released 17 of the 28 original books, the publication of the rest of the series was transferred to a German publisher, Mantikore-Verlag. The deal only include the republication of the last eleven books of the original series (18-28) and did not include the first publication of the new four books (29-32).

On 1 April 2015, it was announced that book 29 would be first published in Italian by Vincent Books in November 2015, and then in English by Mantikore-Verlag the following month. However, the English version was not published as the rights transferred once again before the publication, after Mantikore had released books 18 to 22.

==== Cubicle 7 (2015) ====
Since April 2013, Joe Dever had made a partnership with Cubicle 7 to work on the series, which led to the publication of a new version of the role-playing game. In December 2015, Cubicle 7 Entertainment announced that they would be publishing the entire series of Lone Wolf gamebooks, including the English version of Lone Wolf 29, only to come back on their decision the following month.

==== Holmgard Press (Since 2016) ====
On 1 April 2016, Joe Dever announced that he would publish the remaining Lone Wolf books himself with his own imprint, Holmgard Press, starting with the publication of book 29 later the same month, which was finally published on 13 May 2016, 18 years after the publication of book 28. This included the publication of the four gamebooks that were never published before (29 to 32) and the republication of the gamebooks that were neither republished by Mongoose or Mantikore (23 to 28).

Following Dever's death in November 2016, his son Ben and longtime fan Vincent Lazzari were tasked to complete the series, a decision that was difficult for Ben who had not read the books when he was a child. Book 30, Dead in the Deep was published in Italian in 2018 with plans to publish it in English in 2019, along with book 23, Mydnight's Hero. Both books were released on June 27 of that year.

As of August 2026, Holmgard Press has published books 23 to 28 in a "Collector's Edition", 29 to 32 in a "First Edition", and the first 20 books of the series, along with the 32nd, in a "Definitive Edition". The last story of the series, Light of the Kai, will be published in two volumes, with volume 1 having been released in May 2026.

Other than the main gamebook series, Holmgard Press expanded the universe with the publication of other gamebooks and novels set in Aon. This includes The Huntress (a trilogy about an amnesiac Huntress) and Chronicles of Magnamund (an anthology series featuring various literary genre), along with the republication of the Legends of Lone Wolf series of novels and the Autumn Snow gamebook series.

==== Megara Entertainment (2014) ====
In September 2014, the publisher Megara Entertainment announces the publication of a spinoff, Autumn Snow, approved by Joe Dever and written by Martin Charbonneau, and calls for a crowdfunding to finance original illustrations from Gary Chalk. This is the adaptation of a work from Martin "The Oiseau" Charbonneau previously published in French the webzine Draco Venturus by the non-profit publisher Scriptarium. Two books were published, The Pit of Darkness and The Wildlands Hunt, before the publisher ceased operation.

Megara also republished the first book of The World of Lone Wolf series, written by Ian Page, Grey Star The Wizard.

=== The Definitive Edition ===
In June 2021, it was announced that Holmgard Press would make a second reprint of the whole series called the Definitive Edition, leading to the publication of the last story of the series, Light of the Kai, which will be split into two volumes. On October 31, 2021, it was announced that the first three books of the Definitive Edition were to be launched together in January 2022, but delays pushed the release to March 2022. The first three paperbacks were published in the US in January 2023.

As of February 2026, the first twenty books have been released.

=== Reprint edition details ===
==== Extended version of Flight from the Dark and The Hunger of Sejanoz ====
When Flight from the Dark was released by Mongoose Publishing in the Collector's Edition format, it was partially rewritten and extended by Joe Dever to 550 sections instead of the original 350. It features a retcon of the opening of the book, where instead of Lone Wolf waking to find everyone at his monastery dead, he joins the fight. Dever has stated that, since he has the chance, and considers himself a better writer, that this is a good opportunity to make a better beginning. Longtime fan and assistant Jonathan Blake said of the retconning that overall, despite his love of the original, the surprises, grittier illustrations, and better writing have "won him over". As of 2023, Holmgard Press offers both the original (as a softcover) and extended (as a hardcover) versions of this book in the Definitive Edition format.

The Hunger of Sejanoz had only 300 sections when it was originally published in 1998, as the last book in the initial publication run of the series. When Holmgard Press republished the book in November 2022, it was extended to the originally planned 350 sections, with Ben Dever and Vincent Lazzari writing the new 50 sections.

==== Differences between the various editions ====
Holmgard Press makes a difference between the first republication of the series by various publishers, their own second republication and the first publication of gamebooks 29 to 32.

The first republication of the first 28 gamebooks (made by Mongoose, Mantikore-Verlag and Holmgard Press) are called Collector's Edition. They have a hardcover and contain a bonus mini-adventure added at the end of each book (except book 1) featuring a character that is encountered during the main adventure or that lives events linked to it, although some of them are not linked to the main story whatsoever (like the various instalments of the Dire series). These bonus adventures were written by various authors under the supervision of Dever or the staff of Holmgard Press after his death and don't have the same amount of sections than the main adventure.

Gamebooks 29 to 31 have been published for the very first time by Holmgard Press between 2016 and 2020 and are called First Edition by the publisher. The three books share common elements with the Collector's Edition of the other gamebooks, with a hardcover and a bonus adventure for books 29 and 30. However, they lack the Collector's Edition tag on the cover and book 31 doesn't have a bonus adventure like the other ones.

The second republication of the full series started in March 2022, which is also made by Holmgard Press, and is called the Definitive Edition. It doesn't have the bonus adventures like the Collector's Edition but features encyclopedic entries about different characters, places and artefacts that the player came across during the main adventure. Some adjustments have also been made to the main story of each book, with changes to some enemy stats, new powers granted by certain items and corrections to the text and some of the links of the previous editions. New sets of rules for advanced players are also offered. As of July 2026, the first twenty books and book 32, volume 1 are available in hardcover and the first twelve in softcover, while ebook versions are due to be published at a later date. The chief differences between the hardbacks and the paperback books are the maps (in colours in the hardbacks, black and white in the paperback) and the 350 section 'classic' version of Flight from the Dark in the paperback versus its 550 section version in the hardbacks.

The Limited Edition is the signed and numbered to 350 version of the Definitive Edition.

==== Internal artwork ====
The Collector's Edition of the books feature new internal artwork by Richard Longmore (books 1 to 12, 17 and 20), Nathan Furman (books 13 and 18), Pascal Quidault (books 14 to 16), Hauke Kock (book 19 and 21) and Stephanie Böhm (book 21). However, the original illustrations by the late Brian Williams were reused for books 22 to 28.

For the First Edition of gamebooks 29 to 31, Giuseppe Camuncoli was hired to illustrate book 29, while Richard "Nerdgore" Sampson did the illustrations for books 30 and 31. Gary Chalk will return to the series by illustrating Light of the Kai.

For the Definitive Edition by Holmgard Press, Richard "Nerdgore" Sampson provided entirely new artwork for the extended version of book 1. For the original version of book 1 and for books 2 to 8, the original art by Gary Chalk will be reused. No information is currently available for the internal artwork of the subsequent books.

Illustrations for the various bonus adventures were done by Nathan Furman (books 2 to 11 and 17), Richard Longmore (books 12 to 16 and 23), Stephanie Böhm (books 18, 20 and 21), Aljosa Mujabasic (book 20), Hauke Kock (books 19, 22 and 24), Richard "Nerdgore" Sampson (books 25 and 26), Olivier Raynaud (Koa) (books 27 and 28) and Adélaïde Euriat (book 29). No illustrations were made for the bonus adventure in book 30.

== Series synopsis ==
A map of Magnamund

Magnamund, a planet in the universe of Aon, is the focus of battle between the powers of Good, among them Kai (God of the Sun) and Ishir (Goddess of the Moon), and Naar, the evil God of Darkness.

In the north-east of Magnamund's northern continent lies the realm of Sommerlund. Its people, the Sommlending, are devoted followers of Kai. There are those among them, known as Kai Lords or simply 'the Kai', who possess extraordinary innate abilities. Trained from childhood at the Kai Monastery, the Kai Lords are Sommerlund's greatest defence against Naar's agents.

Naar's champions upon Magnamund are the Darklords, who dwell in the scorched, volcanic wastes of the Darklands, west of Sommerlund. This realm, inhospitable to most life, enables the Darklords to survive on Magnamund – though powerful, they are greatly weakened by the natural atmosphere of their world. Forced to enact their will at a distance, the Darklords wage war with armies of Drakkarim (humans devoted to Naar), Giaks (goblin-like creatures spawned in vast numbers), and other creatures, and are served by agents such as Vordaks (undead with psychic powers) and Helghasts (shapechanging undead).

At the Kai Monastery is a young initiate, given the name Silent Wolf. On the feastday of Fehmarn, when all the Kai Lords gather at the monastery, Silent Wolf is sent to cut wood from the surrounding forest as a punishment for his inattention in class. While he is gone, a surprise attack is launched from the Darklands at several places across Sommerlund. The Monastery is assaulted and the gathered Kai Lords massacred. Rushing back from the woods, Silent Wolf is knocked out by a low-lying tree branch (in the Legends of Lone Wolf novelizations based on the books, it's implied that the branch was placed there by a demi-goddess called Alyss so Silent Wolf would be spared the attack). When he awakes, he finds himself the only survivor. The last of the Kai, he renames himself Lone Wolf and sets out for the capital to inform the King of the loss of the Kai.

In the re-release version of Flight from the Dark in 2007 by Mongoose Publishing, the beginning of the story is slightly different as Silent Wolf takes part in the battle.

=== The Kai Series ===
The Kai Series (gamebooks 1 to 5) follows Lone Wolf as he rallies the armies of Sommerlund and her ally, Durenor, to repel the invasion, pursues and captures the traitor who brought about the invasion, and survives plots to complete the destruction of the Kai.

In Flight from the Dark, Lone Wolf reaches the King in Holmgard who then dispatches him to Durenor to recover the Sommerswerd in Fire on the Water, and returning to defeat Archlord Zagarna, leader of the Darklords. The third book, The Caverns of Kalte, finds Lone Wolf chasing the betrayer of Sommerlund, Vonotar, in the frozen northern wastes of Kalte. In The Chasm of Doom, Lone Wolf thwarts the resurrection of the first and most powerful Darklord, Vashna. At the end of the series, in Shadow on the Sand, Lone Wolf recovers the Book of the Magnakai, the ancient text which contains the higher lore of the Kai Lords through an encounter with Haakon, the new leader of the Darklords. With the massacre of the Kai, and Lone Wolf only an initiate, these teachings were thought to be lost.

=== The Magnakai Series ===
The Magnakai Series (gamebooks 6 to 12) continues the tale, with Lone Wolf now a fledgling Kai Master striving to understand the Magnakai teachings. The Book of the Magnakai, however, is ancient and incomplete. To perfect his understanding and train a new order of Kai Lords, Lone Wolf must follow the path of Sun Eagle, the first Kai Lord and author of the Book of the Magnakai. Sun Eagle quested for the wisdom encapsulated in the Lorestones of Nyxator, seven orbs scattered across Northern Magnamund.

As Lone Wolf begins the same quest, however, war breaks out again. The Darklords have again rallied behind a new leader, Archlord Gnaag, and now hasten their invasion to defeat the Magnakai quest. In The Kingdoms of Terror, Lone Wolf pursues the quest through the war-torn realms to find the Lorestone of Varetta. Castle Death leads Lone Wolf to his first encounter with the Elder Magi and the capture of a second Lorestone in the fortress of Kazan-Oud. The third Lorestone is found in the Danarg swamp in The Jungle of Horrors. An old enemy from Shadow on the Sand is finally defeated in The Cauldron of Fear.

Lone Wolf then makes the perilous journey to the edge of the Darklands, deep in the territory of the Darklords. There, in The Dungeons of Torgar, he falls into a void leading beyond the plane of Magnamund. Finding the final two Lorestones and finally settling the score with Vonotar, Lone Wolf is able to return to Sommerlund, chronicled in The Prisoners of Time. When Lone Wolf returns to Magnamund, he finds that 8 years have passed and most of the world is under the grip of the Darklords under the leadership of Archlord Gnaag. Ultimately, in The Masters of Darkness, Lone Wolf enters the Darkland capital of Helgedad and brings about the destruction of the Darklords after having faced and bested Archlord Gnaag himself in single combat.

=== The Grand Master Series ===
The Grand Master Series (gamebooks 13 to 20) continues the story of Grand Master Lone Wolf and introduces the restored order of Kai Lords. With the destruction of the Darklords, Naar and his agents abandon open warfare and seek new paths to dominance, often focused directly on Lone Wolf as the keystone of the forces of Light.

In The Plague Lords of Ruel, Lone Wolf meets for the first time Archdruid Cadak, leader of the Cener Druids, and destroys the deadly virus they were creating to wipe out all life on Magnamund. Following that, the closest friend of Lone Wolf, Guildmaster Banedon, is kidnapped. The Kai Grand Master makes haste to save his friend in The Captives of Kaag. Meanwhile, Warlord Magnaarn of Nyras is trying to find the Doomstone of Darke to combine it with the Nyras Sceptre. In The Darke Crusade, Lone Wolf tries to find the Doomstone before the Drakkarim. For the second time, Lone Wolf prevents the resurrection of Darklord Vashna in The Legacy of Vashna.

Shortly after, The Deathlord of Ixia comes into possession of the Deathstaff, an item to be used to resurrect Vashna. But while Lone Wolf is away from Sommerlund, Naar attempts to destroy the Kai Monastery for the second time in Dawn of the Dragons. Following his defeat, the Dark God executes a new plan for revenge on Lone Wolf by sending a doppelgänger named Wolf's Bane in the book of the same name. During the mission involving Wolf's Bane, Lone Wolf finds out that Naar had come into possession of the holy Moonstone. In his final mission, the Kai Grand Master infiltrates the Plane of Darkness to retrieve the sacred jewel in The Curse of Naar.

=== The New Order Series ===
The New Order Series (gamebooks 21 to 32) was originally intended to be 12 books long but in January 2023, Holmgard Press announced that the 12th book would be split into two volumes, bringing the series to a total of 13 books. Only the first eight books were originally released before the cancellation of the series in 1998; it took 18 years before the next book got published.

The New Order series features a new protagonist, a Grand Master in the Second Order of the Kai and a student of Lone Wolf, who is now Supreme Master. This series allows the player to 'customize' his character by allowing the choice of an individual name (originally, the name was speculated to be Falco Nero, or Black Hawk).

Much of the series focuses on attempts by Naar's minions to use remnants of the power of Agarash the Damned, Naar's greatest champion and predecessor to the Darklords. The series is mostly set in Southern Magnamund, centre of Agarash's empire, which was not featured in the earlier series. In Voyage of the Moonstone, the new protagonist is sent to the Isle of Lorn to return the Moonstone to its creators, the Shianti. However, this book ends midway during the trip, in Elzian. The second part of this adventure plays out in The Buccaneers of Shadaki. After completing this quest, the Grand Master is sent, in Mydnight's Hero, to the Isle of Sheasu to persuade Prince Karvas, heir of the King of Siyen, to return to his homeland to claim the throne before the evil Baron Sadanzo takes it.

In Rune War, the Kai Order goes on a crusade to help the land of Lyris which has been invaded by the forces of Eldenora. The enemy leader, Lord Vandyan, has come into possession of the Runes of Agarash which grants him great power. At the end of the mission to destroy the runes, the Grand Master learns that Lone Wolf has been kidnapped and taken to the former Darklands' stronghold of Gazad Helkona. Similar to The Captives of Kaag, the Grand Master sets out to the rescue of his leader in Trail of the Wolf. A year later, in The Fall of Blood Mountain, the Grand Master is sent to help the Kingdom of Bor. Its inhabitants, the dwarves, have freed the evil Shom'zaa, who is now wreaking havoc in the caves of this subterranean land. He returns to Southern Magnamund in Vampirium, to deal with Autarch Sejanoz of Bhanar, who has found the Claw of Naar, a powerful weapon. After retrieving this artefact from the Autarch, in The Hunger of Sejanoz the Grand Master escorts Xo-lin, emperor of Chai, to safety in the distant city of Tazhan across the Lissanian Plain as news of Sejanoz' invasion force reach the palace in Pensei.

The following adventure, The Storms of Chai, takes place 18 years later. Just like for the Nyras Sceptre from The Darke Crusade, the Claw of Naar can be coupled with a mystical evil stone to increase its power. This jewel, the Eye of Agarash, is set on the throne of the Khea-Khan (emperor) of Chai and the mission of the Grand Master is to retrieve it. This is just one of the six missions Lone Wolf has given to his six Grand Masters: upon completing his mission, the Grand Master learns that two of his brothers have died during their own missions and that Grand Master Steel Hand has been captured by the forces of darkness near the Maakengorge.

In Dead in the Deep, the Grand Master must rescue Steel Hand before it is too late. Travelling to the ruins of the Lyrisian city of Emolyria, the Grand Master discovers that the Lake of Blood, which once surrounded Helgedad, had moved to the bottom of the Maakengorge. The Nadziranim are using the power of the lake to open a Shadow Gate and bring forth the Tzomah, an incarnation of the Chaos-master of the Daziarn. Freeing Steel Hand, the Grand Master also destroys the hidden fortress under Emolyria.

In The Dusk of Eternal Night, Archlord Vashna has returned but that is not the only danger the Grand Master faces. An evil secret organisation is preparing a ritual to free the True Son of Naar and the Grand Master must stop it before it is too late.

The last story of the series is Light of the Kai and will be divided into two volumes. The original target publication dates for both volumes were October 2024 and October 2025 respectively, but the first volume was delayed, initially until the start of [2025], then mid-2025, and then some time in 2026. Light of the Kai: Volume One was eventually published on 12 May 2026.

== Reception ==
The gamebook series was published between 1984 and 1998 in over 30 countries, translated into 18 languages, and sold in excess of 10 million copies worldwide. Each of the first 20 books had average print runs of 250,000.

The response to the original Lone Wolf book series has been largely positive. Three books of the series won "Game Book of the Year" between 1985 and 1987. The series was also awarded the Gamemaster International "All Time Great" award in 1991. The high quality of Joe Dever's descriptive prose received special praise, as well as the fact that the books, if played together, form a cohesive continuing story, with recurring characters (something not often seen in gamebooks).

In the inaugural issue of The Games Machine, John Woods called the combat system "quite ingenious, including considerably more variety than that of Fighting Fantasy while being just as easy to use." He noted that one could play any book in the series as a standalone adventure, but recommended playing the books as an ongoing series, saying "the feel of a book is added to if it is played as part of an on-going saga – one of the factors that has made Lone Wolf so successful.

The 2007 extended version of Flight from the Dark was also well received by critics. It was a semi-finalist for the 34th Origins Awards in the "Publication, fiction" category while its German version won the 2010 RPC Game Award in the "Gamebook" category.

== Adaptations ==
=== Film ===
Three scripts were developed for a potential Lone Wolf film release but they did not proceed beyond the pre-production phase. However, in July 2009, a small company, called Convergence Entertainment, who produced the King of Fighters movie, announced that it had bought the rights to make a live-action film based on Lone Wolf.

=== Audio ===
The Legends of Lone Wolf novel Eclipse of the Kai was abridged as an audio book read by Edward da Souza on 7 May 1992. Another was recorded but not released. A version narrated and composed by Joe Dever was also made, but never released.

There was also a series of telephone adventures called Phonequest, one of which was known as Fortress of Doom.

=== Video games ===
Lone Wolf - The Mirror of Death (1991), ZX Spectrum

Three computer games were released during the late 1980s using the Lone Wolf license. The first two, published by Hutchinson, were adapted from the first two gamebooks, while the third, from Audiogenic Software and entitled Mirror of Death, featured an original storyline. Mirror of Death was well received by several game magazines.

An online MMORPG was in development by fans with the support of Joe Dever and a playable demo had been released for beta testing, but development abruptly stopped when it was announced that a first-person computer game was being developed by Singapore-based Ksatria Gameworks Pte Ltd. Joe Dever was cited as Lead Designer on the project, for which no official release date have ever been announced. The studio also had the license to produce more Lone Wolf games. However, the company abruptly dissolved in 2009 because of the Great Recession. The rights to make a video game were shortly held by Red Entertainment before the Italian company Forge Reply announced in August 2011 that it was working on a game for the next-gen consoles.

In March 2013, an application for IOS and Android was unveiled by Forge Reply at the Game Developers Conference as a story occurring between the third and fourth books, taking Lone Wolf to a mining town to unravel a mystery. Called Joe Dever's Lone Wolf, it consisted of four separate acts, the first one being called "Rockstarn" which was released in November 2013. The following acts, named "Forest Hunt", "Shianti Temple", and "V’taag" respectively, were subsequently released. The four acts were then released together in one bundle for the Xbox One and PlayStation 4 in 2016, and then for Nintendo Switch in 2018.

An adaption of the first five books for the Nintendo DS handheld console, called LoneWolfDS, is available in homebrew format. Lone Wolf Saga, a complete Android version of the first 20 gamebooks (the Kai, Magnakai and Grandmaster sub-series) is available, similarly Seventh Sense S is a complete Microsoft Windows version. All used Project Aon's licence and data.

Two game modules for the game Neverwinter Nights were named after the Lone Wolf book series.

On October 10, 2018, the Lone Wolf AR game was announced. Describing itself as the world's first augmented reality role-playing game, it was developed by Visionizar LTD and was launched at the Lucca Comics & Games event on October 31, 2018.

=== Tabletop roleplaying game ===
Several adaptations also exist of the Lone Wolf series, including Lone Wolf: The Roleplaying Game, a D20-style role-playing game from Mongoose Publishing Ltd UK. A second version of this role-playing game, Lone Wolf Multiplayer Game Book, with rules closer to those of the gamebooks, was also released by Mongoose. A third version, by Cubicle 7, is currently in preparation.

In 2004 the license was adapted as Lone Wolf: The Roleplaying Game, a role-playing game by Mongoose Publishing under the Open Game License using Mongoose's OGL System. This has met mostly with praise for its adaptation of the Lone Wolf world, though some believe that there are many overlooked problems with the RPG, such as balance between classes and "hard to interpret" rules. Dever is credited with helping the game's principal designer, August Hahn, incorporate information from his final four unreleased books into the game. A line of miniatures was also created for the game.

In March 2010, a new version of the roleplaying game called Lone Wolf Multiplayer Game Book, with rules closer to the ones of the gamebooks, was launched by Mongoose Publishing. The French editor Scriptarium took part of the development of the background. In March 2013, Cubicle 7 announced that it had obtained the rights to develop a roleplaying game based on Lone Wolf.

On 30 October 2013, Cubicle 7 announced the development of a new roleplaying game, called Lone Wolf Adventure Game, as "a development of the previous Multiplayer Game". A crowdfunding was launched on Kickstarter and collected £68,000. On 26 August 2014, C7 publishes the character sheet with a summary of rules. The core rules were released in 2015 as a boxed set consisting of three books: Book of Kai Training, allowing players to create their own characters for the game, Book of Kai Wisdom, containing the rules to play the game, and the Book of Kai Legends which consists of two adventures and advice on creating future adventures. In addition to the books pre-generated characters and blank character sheets were included. The boxed set was designed to be played straight from the box, with the first adventure in the Book of Kai Legends allowing new players to start with the pre-generated characters and play immediately.

== See also ==
- Choose Your Own Adventure
- Fighting Fantasy, Advanced Fighting Fantasy
- Way of the Tiger
