= Peter Andrew Jones =

British artist (born 1951)

- Born: Peter Andrew Jones; 14 December 1951 (age 74)
- Education: Saint Martins School of Art
- Known for: Illustration
- Movement: Fantasy, science fiction, wildlife, aviation, rural, urban
- Website: peterandrewjones.net

Peter Andrew Jones (born 14 December 1951) is a British artist and illustrator who has produced a large number of fantasy and science fiction genre illustrations. During a professional career of over 43 years he has worked on book jacket covers, film posters, advertising, and games, as well as contributing to many BBC TV and commercial TV programs and projects.

== Early life ==
Peter Andrew Jones was born on 14 December 1951 in Islington, north London, into the relative poverty of post-war Britain. He was the son of Reginald and Catherine Jones; his father was an engineer. He showed an interest in the visual arts from an early age. He describes the London of his early boyhood as 'smog-ridden and grey', with little for children to do, and he took to painting to fill time and "colour his world". He also developed a lifelong love of aviation and space technology, encouraged by commercial Airfix kits and by drawing fighter aircraft at RAF Leuchars when visiting his mother's relatives in Fife, Scotland. At school he continued to pursue his interest in art and won numerous school prizes for his work. Frequent Sunday visits with his parents to London's National and Tate Galleries before the age of twelve further fixed his interest in a future career in the field.

With the encouragement of his art tutor, Bob Spearman, Jones attended Saint Martins School of Art in London in 1970, where he studied graphic design, graduating in 1974. At the college, a visiting lecturer suggested Jones combine his interest in realism with imaginative skills, drawing Jones into the fantasy and science fiction fields. Whilst at St. Martins, Jones took the decision to "become an illustrator". Within a month he was producing his first commercial work for Puffin Books, the cover for Penelope Farmer's A Castle of Bone.

== Career ==
The Complete Enchanter, cover for an edition of The Compleat Enchanter collection of fantasy tales by L. Sprague de Camp and Fletcher Pratt, later appearing on the cover of White Dwarf magazine issue 54.

He went on to spend several decades producing cover art for science fiction and fantasy publications. During his career he has provided book covers for science fiction and fantasy authors including Isaac Asimov, Ray Bradbury, Arthur C. Clarke, Greg Bear, Larry Niven, Philip K. Dick, Marion Zimmer Bradley and Harry Harrison. An anthology of Jones' work, Peter Jones: Solar Wind, was published by Paper Tiger in 1980 and covered his science fiction and fantasy illustrations up to the year 1980. Since 1999 he has published the book himself through his current company, along with several other editions, including further volumes of the book.

He also produced images for film publicity, creating the movie posters for The Sword and The Sorcerer and Alligator. During the early 1980s he contributed to television shows including the BBC comedy The Two Ronnies Show and the BBC's '80s science fiction adaptation of The Tripods. He has also produced cover illustrations for video game publishers such as US Gold, Psygnosis and Virgin Interactive.

Jones worked on the Fighting Fantasy game books originated by Steve Jackson and Ian Livingstone in the 1980s, in particular providing the original cover for the first title in the series in 1982. It has often been claimed that the book's publishers were distressed by Jones' illustration for the cover of The Warlock of Firetop Mountain because he designed it with space for the title in the centre of the front cover, departing from the publishing tradition of placing titles at the top of the page. However, Jones had been called in to rescue the book's launch; the publisher told him "we've no idea how to do this, we don't understand this new type of book" and asked him to "go away, and come back with something revolutionary". Inspired by the layouts of many American romance titles of the time, which a Dutch editor in Rotterdam had given him while he was en route to the Frankfurt Book Fair, he decided to break with tradition in the UK market and use a similar layout. He provided several further pieces for the Puffin Fighting Fantasy series, including covers for Starship Traveller, Talisman of Death, and The Riddling Reaver, as well as over twenty cover illustrations for Joe Dever's Lone Wolf game books and a number of covers for Mark Smith and Jamie Thomson's Falcon series.

Also during this time, a number of Jones' fantasy images appeared on the covers of Games Workshop's White Dwarf magazine. From covers for the magazine, Jones went on to produce game art for Games Workshop's boardgame adaptation of the first Fighting Fantasy title, The Warlock of Firetop Mountain, followed by cover art for Games Workshop's edition of Chaosium's Stormbringer RPG. The processes involved in Jones' production of the cover for Stormbringer were detailed in an Illuminations feature in White Dwarf issue 90.

During the 1990s Jones further pursued his interest in aviation-related art, becoming involved with the RAF Benevolent Fund and a number of World War II pilots. His illustrations of aircraft and aerial combat appear in a variety of books on the subject, and his work in the field has been commended by pilots, including one-time World War II pilot George H. W. Bush.

During the late 1970s Jones set up his own design studio and licensing company, Solar Wind Ltd, based first in London's Fulham Road and then, from 1980, in Wimbledon, London, to facilitate his ongoing illustration work and manage the licensing of his images. Solar Wind was closed down in the late 1990s, when he decided to develop the name for a wider remit, bringing together work in various fields. In late 1999 Jones moved Solar Wind to Shropshire, from where he operates his current company. Jones' current work includes ongoing genre and wildlife illustration, the production of handmade and self-published books, cards and prints, and occasional private commissions. He is also working on further self-published collections of his work, including Affetti, Rural Dreams, Simulacra, and Tales from the wood, about the Faeries who inhabit his studio's garden, as well as an illustrated dark fantasy novel series titled Crux Millennium.

== Style and technique ==
As a child Jones was influenced by the popular media of the 1960s, including the Eagle's Dan Dare, DC's Superman and Batman comics, and television programmes like Thunderbirds, Doctor Who and Star Trek. Later he was exposed to the alternative culture of the decade, discovering underground artists like Robert Crumb, Mick English and Martin Sharp, and Pop art such as that of Peter Blake and David Hockney. Salvador Dalí, whom he considered 'science fantasy', was also a guiding influence during his early years. Whilst at college, Jones was introduced to American artists and illustrators like Norman Rockwell, Andrew Wyeth and James Bama, a frequent illustrator of the Doc Savage books. Bama, particularly his Western genre art, made a lasting impact, and Jones still considers him both a genius and the single greatest influence on his work.

Jones' science fiction and fantasy work predominantly features central characters set against the backdrop of other-worldly landscapes.

Jones works primarily in hand-mixed oil paint and also acrylic, using a painting medium of his own invention that he calls "acryloil". In recent years he has also adopted the use of a Macintosh computer and drawing tablet, though primarily for editorial purposes and not the creation of paintings. Jones' handmade prints, sold via his website, are sometimes embellished with gold and rare pigments such as lapis lazuli.

Cover illustrations such as that for the Stormbringer RPG are executed in alternating layers of oil and acrylic colour, at that time including the use of an airbrush, on an emulsion-primed hardboard support. In the case of Stormbringer, the support was lightly dusted with plaster whilst wet and sealed with an oil wash. White Dwarf's art editor John Blanche said of Jones' take on Elric, "Peter's strong design sense and dramatic choice of colours have combined to produce the definitive image of Elric, as the battle-crazed albino, dominated by his demon sword, Stormbringer. . ."
