= Brian Williams (illustrator) =

British illustrator (1956–2010)

Brian John Williams (19 April 1956 – 4 October 2010) was an illustrator.

== Career ==
Williams was known for his work in various fantasy magazines and novels, including the later Lone Wolf gamebooks written by Joe Dever as well as the Real Life Adventure books by Jon Sutherland.

Williams also made contributions to White Dwarf magazine.

His Dungeons & Dragons artwork includes the adventures Drums on Fire Mountain (1984), All That Glitters... (1984), Where Chaos Reigns (1985), Dark Clouds Gather (1985), and Night's Dark Terror (1986).

He died in his home at Shefford, UK, at the age of 54. A funeral was held on 22 October 2010.
