= Joe Dever's Lone Wolf =

2013 role-playing video game

- Developers: Forge Reply, Atlantyca Lab
- Publisher: BulkyPix
- Platforms: iOS, macOS, Windows, PlayStation 4, Xbox One, Android, Nintendo Switch
- Release: iOS, macOS, Windows: WW: 29 October 2013; PS4, Xbox One: WW: 16 March 2016; Nintendo Switch: WW: 16 February 2018
- Genre: Role-playing game
- Mode: Single-player

Joe Dever's Lone Wolf is a role-playing game video game developed by Italian studio Forge Reply and first published by BulkyPix for iOS on 29 October 2013. The game has since been ported to PlayStation 4, Xbox One and Nintendo Switch. It is based on the series of gamebooks by author Joe Dever entitled Lone Wolf. The story involves Lone Wolf adventuring to uncover the secret of the Shianti Cube.

== Gameplay ==
While traditional 3D action RPG combat is the main focus on the game, plot is mostly delivered through first-person perspective texts similar to the gamebook series. It also includes various supernatural disciplines learned by the Kai to give them otherworldly powers including the ability to psychically attack their opponents and defend against them. Decisions made by the player outside of combat sequence have an impact on how the plot evolves.

== Plot ==
The story takes place between Lone Wolf books three and four, titled The Caverns of Kalte and The Chasm of Doom. Lone Wolf is asked to intervene in the Sommlending village of Rockstarn as Giaks have invaded it. But as he tries to help the villagers, he discovers that the invaders have a very precise objective in mind.

== Development ==
A week before the Gamescom gaming convention in 2011, a teaser website was posted with the words "Be Kai", which soon after was revealed by game developer Forge Reply to be an upcoming Lone Wolf video game. Creator Joe Dever described the game as the one that finally "got it right". Dever described the game as presenting the protagonist Lone Wolf with a Batmanesque darkness while still being a "paragon of virtue". The game was developed to be more action-oriented than the books to help translate the story from book to game.

Audio production studio 93 Steps was used to create the soundscape of the game, including music, sound effects and voices. The studio was curious to test how many fans Lone Wolf still had since the books went out of print in several western countries, and used Facebook to let people play through the original Lone Wolf book Flight from the Dark, and vote every time there was a choice of direction in the story.

== Reception ==
Reception

Aggregate score
Aggregator	Score
Metacritic	iOS: 79/100 iOS (Act 2): 87/100 iOS (Act 3): 74/100; PC (HD Remastered): 78/100; PS4: 79/100; XONE: 71/100; NS: 79/100

Review scores
Publication	Score
Pocket Gamer	4.5/5 (Act 2) 4.5/5
TouchArcade	4/5

Pocket Gamer praised the interactive text that transforms as you make choices into a 3D game with combat done through a 3rd person perspective. TouchArcade gave the game a 4/5 star rating, saying the game was exciting taking on the role of guiding the protagonist Lone Wolf through the adventure, but had trouble capturing the fun of the gamebooks they originated from.
