= The Kingdoms of Terror =

Book by Joe Dever

- American cover, original release
- Author: Joe Dever
- Illustrator: Gary Chalk
- Cover artist: Gary Chalk (UK) uncredited (UK); Brian Salmon (UK); Peter Andrew Jones (UK); Richard Corben (USA)
- Language: English
- Series: Lone Wolf
- Genre: Fantasy
- Publisher: Beaver Books (UK); Red Fox (UK); Berkley / Pacer (USA)
- Publication date: 1985
- Publication place: United Kingdom
- Media type: Print (Paperback)
- ISBN: 0-425-08446-9
- OCLC: 14152060
- Preceded by: Shadow on the Sand
- Followed by: Castle Death

The Kingdoms of Terror is the sixth book in the award-winning Lone Wolf book series created by Joe Dever. This is the first book in the "Magnakai" portion of the series, which begins after Lone Wolf has spent three years studying the Book of the Magnakai.

== Gameplay ==
This book is the first of the "Magnakai" books, in which Lone Wolf moves onwards from the Kai disciplines of the previous books to new, more powerful Magnakai disciplines. Even though some attributes and special items may be carried forward into this adventure, for the most part, the new disciplines help to level out the playing field of those starting with this book as compared to those who have played through the previous books. Players begin with only 3 out of a possible 10 Magnakai disciplines, requiring more careful selection than in Flight from the Dark. This book also introduces "The Lore Circles of the Magnakai", in which the player receives bonuses to Combat and Endurance points by selecting groups of Magnakai disciplines. Furthermore, an additional gameplay element is introduced with the addition of the bow, a weapon not available in the previous five adventures. It is used in special instances in the adventure and uses random number choices bolstered by Weapon Mastery and situation modifiers to determine success or failure.

== Plot ==
In order to fulfill his pledge to restore the Kai, Lone Wolf must first himself become a Kai Grand Master. To accomplish this monumental task, he must retrieve the Lore Stones led only by the wisdom of Sun Eagle, the First Kai Grandmaster. As the last of the Kai, there is little to guide Lone Wolf in his studies, except for a faded inscription in the Book of the Magnakai directing him to seek the Lorestone of Varetta. And so, Lone Wolf sets off for Varetta in the Stornlands, far to the south of Sommerlund, to find this ancient relic and revive the glory of the Kai.
