= Hysteria Project 2 =

2011 video game

- Developer: BulkyPix
- Publishers: BulkyPix; Sanuk Games (PlayStation)
- Platforms: iOS, PlayStation 3/PlayStation Portable
- Release: iOS: WW: January 27, 2011; PlayStation Store: EU: August 10, 2011; NA: August 23, 2011
- Genres: Adventure, Survival horror, FMV
- Mode: Single-player

Hysteria Project 2 is a 2011 FMV survival horror adventure game developed and published by French studio BulkyPix for iOS and first released on the App Store on January 27, 2011. It was released as a PlayStation mini available for play on the PlayStation 3 and PlayStation Portable on August 10, 2011, in Europe and August 23, 2011, in North America. The port was published by Sanuk Games. The game is a sequel to the 2009 game Hysteria Project.

== Gameplay ==
As with the first game, Hysteria Project 2 is played from a first-person perspective and composed entirely of full motion video scenes as the unnamed protagonist attempts to flee a man wielding an axe. The gameplay is more varied than in the original game, and involves tapping on the touchscreen during context sensitive moments, and solving various types of puzzle or hidden object-type minigames.

An interactive FMV scene in the game. The player must get from behind the wall to the door on the right without being seen. Swiping to the left moves the player further behind the wall, swiping to the right makes the player peer around the corner.

The decision tree aspect which dominated the gameplay of the first game is largely absent in the sequel, where decision making is more focused on selecting something on-screen rather than the choice between rigid alternatives. For example, upon entering a room, the player can choose between several actions, such as looking around the room, examining a wardrobe or examining a bodybag. These choices are not presented as text choices as they were in the first game, but are instead available directly in the in-game interface.

Puzzle solving is also more prevalent than in the original game, and tends to be combined with tapping on the touchscreen to perform context sensitive actions. For example, as the player hides from the hooded man, the only way to escape is to run into a nearby room by touching on the door, but the player has only a very limited window of time in which to do so. Another example is found when the player is trapped in a room flooding with poisonous gas, and must manipulate a control panel to escape.

== Plot ==
The game begins with an unidentified man awakening in a hospital bed, to which he has been tied. As the bed is wheeled through a research lab, the man has a series of flashbacks to the first game, and his escape from the hooded man in the woods. A doctor then approaches him, telling him he is exhausted and giving him an injection. Some time passes, and the doctor suddenly panics, saying "He's coming back." She then writes something on the player's arm and leaves.

The player escapes from his restraints and leaves the room. Confronted with a keypad locked door, he discovers that the doctor has written the code on his arm. Running through the corridors, he encounters the hooded man wielding an axe and dragging a body behind him. Escaping the hooded man, the player finds an earpiece in a bodybag. He uses the device to contact the doctor, who reveals herself to be Professor Lisa Spencer, a scientist who was working with nanotechnology in an effort to determine how a human subject would cope with having nanomachines injected into them. However, as she is explaining her work, the hooded man attacks the player, who escapes into a lab, sealing the door behind him.

Looking around the room, he sees a screen showing a video monitor of what appears to be a prison cell holding the smoke monster from the first game. He then logs into Spencer's boss, Gustavo Ortega's, computer, using his dog's name. On the computer he finds footage of his own escape from the woods as well as copies of Sgt. Coyle's files unlocked at the end of the first game. A poison gas is then released into the room, but the player escapes down a hallway filled with lethal lasers, and flees into the basement of the building. However, he is pursued by the hooded man, who turns himself into the black smoke monster and follows the player through an air vent. The game ends with the black smoke re-materializing as the hooded man, and trapping the player in the basement.

As the player progresses through the game, pages of Gustavo Ortega's journal can be found. These pages reveal Ortega's descent into madness after injecting himself with his nanomachines. At first, they make him feel incredible, heightening his senses and giving him limitless energy, but he then starts to experience side effects; migraines, blurred vision, black-outs, insomnia, growths on his skin. Eventually, his body and mind break down, and his journal becomes filled with strange drawings. The last page of his journal is a sellotaped page from another book, entitled "Learn how to use an axe properly."

== Reception ==
Reception

Aggregate scores
Aggregator	Score
GameRankings	57.50% (iOS); 53.33% (PSP)
Metacritic	52/100

Review scores
Publication	Score
IGN	5/10
148 Apps	3.5/5
AppSpy	3/5
PSP Minis	7/10
Slide to Play	2/4

Upon its release, Hysteria Project 2 received mixed to negative reviews. The iOS version of the game holds an aggregate score of 52 out of 100 on Metacritic, based on six reviews. On GameRankings, the iOS version holds a score of 57.50%, based on four reviews, and the PSP version holds a score of 53.33%, also based on four reviews.

Chris Hall of 148Apps scored the game 3.5 out of 5, the same score he had given to the original game. He praised the tone, calling it "the scariest, most immersive game in the App Store", but he was highly critical of the trial-and-error gameplay and the ease with which the player can die; "at the end of the day, fans of immersive horror games will enjoy the fantastic cinematics of Hysteria Project 2. There's no question in my mind that this is the scariest game in the App Store, but it could be so much more. Maybe I'm a wimp, but I don't need to die every 45 seconds to understand the fact that there's a guy that is trying to kill me. I get it. Please stop making me reload."

AppSpy's Andrew Nesvadba scored the game 3 out of 5, criticizing the lack of narrative progression and backstory; "Hysteria Project 2 walks a fine line in keeping its thriller story exciting, but instead of continuing to tread that line it decides to switch off for you."

IGN's Levi Buchanan scored it 5 out of 10 (he had scored the original 7.2). As with 148Apps, he was highly critical of the frequency of death scenes and the trial-and-error nature of the gameplay. He praised the graphics, but concluded that "Hysteria Project 2 has all of the elements needed for a great horror game: excellent sense of dread and panic, great atmospherics, and a good story. But it just bludgeons you with death scenes that constantly rip you out of the experience. When constructing a world this interesting, Bulkypix should be trying to keep the player fully engaged in it. That's how fear is made. I'm not scared by getting killed every 30 seconds. I'm frustrated."

Slide to Play's Andrew Podolsky scored the game 2 out of 4. He found it improved on the original (which he had scored 1 out of 4), lauding the expanded gameplay, more expansive location and longer storyline. However, as with other reviewers, he was critical of the frequency of death scenes; "Although Hysteria Project 2 is more fun to play than the original, it's still a very brief and unsatisfying game. We encountered almost every possible death in the game, but the entire experience lasted under an hour, and we see no reason to play through it again."

PSPminis' Jasper Nikki scored the PSP version 7 out of 10. He praised the atmosphere, but found the frequency of deaths interrupted the gameplay and disrupted the storytelling; "Consistency is what this game is lacking; sometimes the puzzles are straightforward, sometimes they are unreasonable. You have to suffer several deaths without having the faintest clue on what you should do in order to progress."
