= The Curse of the Mummy's Tomb (disambiguation) =

The Curse of the Mummy's Tomb is a 1964 British horror film.

The Curse of the Mummy's Tomb or Curse of the Mummy's Tomb may also refer to:

- Curse of the Mummy's Tomb (board game), a 1988 board game
- The Curse of the Mummy's Tomb, the fifth book in the original Goosebumps book series
- "Curse of the Mummy's Tomb", an episode of the 1999–2006 animated children's TV series Mona the Vampire

== See also ==
- Curse of the pharaohs (disambiguation)
