= Ian Bailey (author) =

English writer

- Born: 1959 (age 66–67); Kent, England
- Education: University of York
- Occupation: Author

Ian Bailey (born 1959 in Kent, England) was the Head Buyer and later Financial Director of Games Workshop until 1985. He left Games Workshop to write books and develop games. He has had seven books published in three languages and three games in the UK and United States. He was a best-selling author in France with the Compton Murder, an interactive detective book, published by Éditions Gallimard.

== Education ==
Ian Bailey gained his first degree in English Literature with Anglo-Saxon at the University of York; he has a Chartered Institute of Marketing (CIM) Diploma in Marketing, an Institute of Direct Marketing Diploma in Direct Marketing and a master's degree in European Marketing from the University of Derby.

== Career ==
Joined Games Workshop Ltd in 1982, first as the Retail Buyer, then Head Buyer and finally Financial Director. In 1985 he left Games Workshop to write Adventure Game Books and found Hatch with Albie Fiore and Ian Waddelow, who were both former Games Workshop employees. Hatch worked within the publishing industry, primarily in conjunction with Penguin books. The partners in Hatch eventually went their separate ways. Ian went on to found Folio Works Ltd., and a highly successful consultancy called ADI. Ian Bailey and Gary Chalk created the game Fantasy Warlord (1990) to compete with Games Workshop's Warhammer Fantasy Battle, but Fantasy Warlord did not last long.

In 1994 he semi-retired to become a Senior Lecturer and Head of European Studies at the University of Derby. Working in conjunction with Loughborough University, he gained recognition from Brussels for the creation of a European Centre of Excellence in the East Midlands. In 1997 he was elected a Fellow of the Royal Society of Arts.

In 1999 he returned full-time to ADI. In 2000 he co-founded ADI Trading Ltd and became the full owner in 2013. This company represents several German and American brands including Schott Zwiesel, Jenaer Glas, Zwiesel 1872, Fries, and Fortessa. The company operates primarily in the United Kingdom hotel and restaurant sectors. It supplies tritan titanium crystal, bone china, porcelain and metalware. It is a sponsor of the International Wine Challenge and the Chaine des Rotisseurs Young Sommeliers under the brand name Schott Zwiesel.

In 2014 he became Vice Charge des Missions of the City of London Bailliage, Chaine des Rotisseurs. In 2016 he became Conseiller Gastronomique for the Bailliage de Grande Bretagne. In 2022 he became a director of Leisure Renaissance Ltd, a Non-Executive Director of Titanic Mill Energy Services and Renaissance Group Ltd. In 2024 he became interim Vice Chair of Derbyshire Dales for Reform UK and in 2025 also assumed the role of interim Treasurer.

== Publications ==
=== Books ===
- 1999 : La Villa des Revenants, Gallimard, Paris ISBN 2-07-050700-9;
- 1990 : Fantasy Warlord Folio Works, Derbyshire ISBN 1-872488-00-5;
- 1996 : Le Mystere de Compton, Gallimard, Paris ISBN 2-07-050699-1;
- 1993 : La Villa des Revenants, Gallimard, Paris ISBN 2-07-056769-9;
- 1992 : Le Mystere de Compton, Gallimard, Paris ISBN 2-07-056768-0;
- 1988 : The Eye, Virgin, London;
- 1985 : Terrors Out of Time, Magnet, London
- 1985 : Where the Shadows Stalk, Magnet, London; ISBN 0-416-52530-X

=== Games ===
- 1987: James Clavell's Shogun, ISBN 1-55560-047-6, FASA Inc, Chicago
- 1987 : James Clavell's Tai-Pan, ISBN 1-55560-049-2, FASA Inc, Chicago
- 1987 : James Clavell's Noble House, ISBN 1-55560-048-4, FASA Inc, Chicago
- 1985 : The Eye of the Idol, Octopus, London (Marks and Spencer Plc 1411119)

=== Articles ===
- 2006, Going Glassy Eyed, The World of Fine Wine, London ISSN 1743-503X;
- 1984, The Goblin Cult of Kernu, White Dwarf 49, Games Workshop, London;
- 1983, Crom Cruach, White Dwarf 48, Games Workshop, London;
- 1983, Extracts from the Travels of Tralk True-Eye, White Dwarf 47, Games Workshop, London;
- 1983, The Shadows of Yog Sothoth, White Dwarf 44, Games Workshop, London;
- 1982, Call of Cthulhu, White Dwarf 32, Games Workshop, London;
- 1982, RuneQuest in England, The Gamer, AHC Publications, Luton
