= Highway 2000 (board game) =

1981 highway combat board game

Highway 2000 is a board game published by Threshold Games in 1981 that is focused on highway combat.

== Description ==
Highway 2000 is a game of armed vehicle combat for 3–5 players that takes place on near-future highways. Players create heavily armed and armored cars, then fight each other in a battle royale.

The game board comes in three pieces portraying a five-lane highway; as action moves ahead, the back third of the map can be shifted to the front of the map, extending the highway.

The game comes with several scenarios that may also include random non-combat cars entering the highway at random times travelling in either direction.

== Publication history ==
In 1979, the movie Mad Max, featuring highway combat, proved to be a hit. The following year, Steve Jackson Games released Car Wars, a microgame using the same theme, and it too proved to be very popular. Several other game publishers followed the trend including Threshold Games with Highway 2000 in 1981, a game designed by Russell Neal, with artwork by Neils Erickson and William Johnson. Unlike Car Wars, which was packaged in a slim plastic microgame box, Highway 2000 was packaged in a small box with a folding flap.

Between 1984 and 1986, AutoVentures, an imprint of Task Force Games, published five expansions, including TurboFire, that were compatible with any of the popular car combat games of the time (Highway 2000, Car Wars, or Battlecars). Other supplements included The Gauntlet, Hell on Wheels, Street Fighter, and Ultraforce.

== Reception ==
Tom Gordon reviewed Highway 2000 in The Space Gamer No. 53. Gordon commented that "I feel that if rules for expanded movement and 'off-road' scenarios had been included, then Highway 2000 might have lived up to its [...] price tag. In its present condition it just doesn't have enough substance for [that price]. Unless you have dollars to burn, I would not recommend purchasing this game."
