= Hell on Wheels (disambiguation) =

"Hell on Wheels" originally referred to the gambling houses, saloons, and brothels that followed the builders of the US transcontinental railroad in the 1860s.

Hell on Wheels may also refer to:

== Film and television ==
- Hell on Wheels (1967 film), an American car-racing film
- Hell on Wheels (2004 film), a German documentary about the Tour de France
- Hell on Wheels (2007 film), an American documentary about roller derby in Texas
- Hell on Wheels (TV series), a 2011–2016 American Western series
  - "Hell on Wheels" (Hell on Wheels episode), the pilot episode of the series
- "Hell on Wheels" (Dr. Quinn, Medicine Woman), a 1995 TV episode

== Music ==
- Hell on Wheels (band), a Swedish indie rock band
- Hell on Wheels (album), by Manowar, 1997
- "Hell on Wheels" (song), by Cher, 1979
- "Hell on Wheels", a song by Betty Blowtorch, 2001
- "Hell on Wheels", a song by Cinderella from Night Songs, 1986
- "Hell on Wheels", a song by the Clarks from Fast Moving Cars, 2004

== Other uses ==
- Hell on Wheels (supplement), a 1984 supplement for the board games Car Wars, Battlecars, and Highway 2000
- 2nd Armored Division (United States), nicknamed "Hell on Wheels"
- Full Throttle: Hell on Wheels, a canceled sequel to the 1995 video game Full Throttle
- Thomas Hellriegel (born 1971), German triathlete nicknamed "Hell on Wheels"

== See also ==
- "Helen Wheels", a 1973 song by Paul McCartney and Wings
