= Shadow on the Sand =

Book by Joe Dever

- American cover, original release
- Author: Joe Dever
- Illustrator: Gary Chalk
- Cover artist: Gary Chalk (UK); Brian Salmon (UK); Peter Andrew Jones (UK); Richard Corben (USA)
- Language: English
- Series: Lone Wolf
- Genre: Fantasy
- Publisher: Beaver Books (UK); Red Fox (UK); Berkley / Pacer (USA)
- Publication date: 1985
- Publication place: United States
- Media type: Print (Paperback)
- ISBN: 0-425-08440-X
- OCLC: 13245284
- Preceded by: The Chasm of Doom
- Followed by: The Kingdoms of Terror

Shadow on the Sand is the fifth book in the award-winning Lone Wolf book series created by Joe Dever. This is the final book in the "Kai" portion of the series.

== Gameplay ==
This is the last book before the reader/player attains the rank of "Kai Master", at which point in time all acquired Kai disciplines are effectively reset in favor of new Magnakai disciplines. Unfortunately, this means that players can be at their relative weakest here in this book if they choose to start playing a new character from scratch.

The actual gamebook is divided into two parts, each having 200 sections. Effectively, one reads or plays through the first portion of the adventure before moving onto the second portion. This is the first and only Lone Wolf book which exhibits this unusual split-adventure construct.

== Plot ==
Once more, the reader (Lone Wolf) must set out on a mission bestowed upon him by the king. This time, the mission is a diplomatic one, in which a crucial peace treaty must be signed in the far away desert empire of Vassagonia.

But as always, things are more complex than they seem, and peace is elusive. Lone Wolf walks into a trap from which he barely escapes, and he must fight the prime Darklord (Haakon) to regain a secret Kai artefact which will determine the fate of the Kai Order. This artifact is called the 'Book of the Magnakai'.
