= Street Fighter (disambiguation) =

Street Fighter is a Japanese video game series and multi-media franchise produced by Capcom.

Street Fighter may also refer to:

== Capcom franchise ==
=== General ===
- Street Fighter (video game), the first game in the series
- Street Fighter (1992 film), an unlicensed animated film
- Street Fighter (1994 film), a live-action film
  - Street Fighter (1994 soundtrack), the original soundtrack for the film
  - Street Fighter, novelization of the film by Todd Strasser
  - Street Fighter: The Battle for Shadaloo, comic adaptation of the film published by DC Comics
  - Street Fighter: The Movie (arcade game), arcade video game based on the film
  - Street Fighter: The Movie (console video game), console video game based on the film
- Street Fighter (2026 film), a reboot of the Street Fighter film series
  - Street Fighter (2026 soundtrack), the original soundtrack for the film
- Street Fighter (TV series), an animated television series
- Street Fighter (Malibu Comics), a 1993 comic book series
- Street Fighter (UDON comics), a 2003 comic book series

=== Street Fighter II ===
- Street Fighter II, the second game in the series
  - Street Fighter II: Champion Edition
  - Street Fighter II: Rainbow Edition, an unauthorised hack of the Champion Edition
  - Street Fighter II Turbo
  - Super Street Fighter II
  - Super Street Fighter II Turbo
  - Hyper Street Fighter II
  - Super Street Fighter II Turbo HD Remix
  - Ultra Street Fighter II
- Street Fighter II: The Animated Movie, an animated film
- Street Fighter II V, an animated television series
- Street Fighter II (manga), a 1993–1994 manga series

=== Street Fighter III ===
- Street Fighter III, the third game in the series
  - Street Fighter III: 2nd Impact
  - Street Fighter III: 3rd Strike

=== Street Fighter IV ===
- Street Fighter IV, the fourth game in the series
  - Super Street Fighter IV
  - Super Street Fighter IV: Arcade Edition
  - Super Street Fighter IV: 3D Edition
  - Ultra Street Fighter IV
- Street Fighter IV: The Ties That Bind, a 2008 original video animation

=== Street Fighter V ===
- Street Fighter V, the fifth game in the series
  - Street Fighter V: Arcade Edition
  - Street Fighter V: Champion Edition

=== Street Fighter Alpha ===
- Street Fighter Alpha, the first game in the series
- Street Fighter Alpha 2, the second game in the series
- Street Fighter Alpha 3, the third game in the series
- Street Fighter Alpha Anthology, compilation of the complete series
- Street Fighter Alpha: The Animation, a 2000 original video animation
- Street Fighter Alpha: Generations, a 2005 original video animation

=== Street Fighter EX ===
- Street Fighter EX, the first game in the series
- Street Fighter EX2, the second game in the series
- Street Fighter EX3, the third game in the series

== Toei Company franchise ==
=== Original Trilogy ===
- Gekitotsu! Satsujin-ken (Japan title)
  - The Street Fighter (International title)
- Satsujin-ken 2 (Japan title)
  - Return of the Street Fighter (International title)
- Gyakushū! Satsujin-ken (Japan title)
  - The Street Fighter's Last Revenge (International title)

=== Spin-off Trilogy ===
- On'na Hissatsu-ken (Japan title)
  - Sister Street Fighter (International title)
- On'na Hissatsu-ken: Kiki Ippatsu (Japan title)
  - Sister Street Fighter: Hanging by a Thread (International title)
- Kaettekita: On'na Hissatsu-ken (Japan title)
  - The Return of the Sister Street Fighter (International title)

== Other media ==
- Street Fighter (1959 film), a B-movie directed by Joseph Sargent
- The Streetfighter, an alternative name for Hard Times, a 1975 film starring Charles Bronson
- Streetfighter, a 1985 album by The Four Seasons
- "Street Fighter", a song by Blackfoot from the 1980 album Tomcattin'
- "Street Fighter", a song by Quiet Riot from the 2001 album Guilty Pleasures
- "Street Fighter", a song by Pom Pom Squad
- Street Fighter (AutoVentures), a 1985 tabletop game supplement for Car Wars

== Other uses ==
- A person who participates in street fighting
- Streetfighter, a type of customized motorcycle
  - Ducati Streetfighter, a naked motorcycle based on the above design principle
- Streetfighter, a conceptual ship design that was part of the United States Navy SC-21 program

== See also ==
- Street Fight (disambiguation)
- Road Fighter
