= The Cauldron of Fear =

Book by Joe Dever

- American cover, original release
- Author: Joe Dever
- Illustrator: Brian Williams
- Cover artist: Fred Gambino (UK); Peter Andrew Jones (UK); Neal McPheeters (USA)
- Language: English
- Series: Lone Wolf
- Genre: Fantasy
- Publisher: Beaver Books (UK); Red Fox (UK); Berkley / Pacer (USA)
- Publication date: 1987
- Publication place: United Kingdom
- Media type: Print (Paperback)
- ISBN: 0-425-10848-1
- OCLC: 17950744
- Preceded by: The Jungle of Horrors
- Followed by: The Dungeons of Torgar

The Cauldron of Fear is the ninth book in the Lone Wolf book series created by Joe Dever. Starting with this book, long-time illustrator Gary Chalk was replaced with Brian Williams.

== Gameplay ==
Lone Wolf books rely on a combination of thought and luck. Certain statistics such as combat skill and endurance attributes are determined randomly before play (reading). The player is then allowed to choose which Magnakai disciplines or skills he or she possess. This number depends directly on how many books in the series have been completed ("Magnakai rank"). With each additional book completed, the player chooses one additional Magnakai discipline.

This book is arguably more linear than some of the previous books, including some sections which offer relatively little choice to the user (i.e. no real branches in the text). It also has arguably the hardest encounter for characters who have gone through the entire series to this point.

== Plot ==
As Lone Wolf races against time to recover the remaining Lorestones, he learns that the next one resides deep underground, beneath the streets of the city of Tahou. Unfortunately, the war against the Darklords has not been going at all well for the freeland nations, and Tahou is now in danger of falling before Lone Wolf even reaches it. If it falls to the Darklords and their Vassagonian allies before the Lorestone is recovered, the hopes of Lone Wolf completing the Magnakai quest will be thwarted forever.
