= Ultraforce (AutoVentures) =

Game supplement

Ultraforce is a 1984 supplement published by AutoVentures for Car Wars, Battlecars, and Highway 2000.

== Gameplay ==
Ultraforce is the third adventure module in a series for auto-combat games, and in this scenario the players are part of the elite "Ultraforce" strikeforce.

== Publication history ==
UltraForce was written by Aaron Allston, with a cover by David Martin, and illustrations by Denis Loubet, and was published by Task Force Games in 1984 as a 32-page book.

== Reception ==
Chris Baylis reviewed Ultraforce for Imagine magazine, and stated that "It is in no way a necessity for auto-combat gaming but might awaken some latent ideas in players bored with the routine run of play."

Jerry Epperson reviewed Ultraforce in Space Gamer No. 72. Epperson commented that "I found Ultraforce to be the most useful and interesting of the AutoVentures modules (and also the deadliest). If you want to put some new thunder in your auto-combats or overhaul your campaign, Ultraforce will provide all the motorvation you need. At last, we closet-duellists can put our skills to a real test, for a real cause! And remember . . . the good guys always win."
