= Fantasy Warlord =

Fantasy miniatures game

Mass Combat Rules
- Fantasy Warlord rulebook cover
- Designers: Ian Bailey, Gary Chalk
- Illustrators: Gary Chalk
- Publishers: Folio Works Ltd.
- Players: 2–4
- Setup time: 10 minutes
- Playing time: 90+ minutes
- Chance: Medium (Dice)
- Age range: 10+
- Skills: Dice rolling Strategy

Fantasy Warlord is a fantasy miniatures game released in 1990 by Folio Works. It was written by Ian Bailey and Gary Chalk who also did the illustrations.

The game was designed and published by two ex-Games Workshop (GW) employees who disagreed with the much more commercial direction that company was taking. It was supposed to rival the Warhammer Fantasy Battle game that GW published.

Fantasy Warlord featured some unusual game mechanics such as simultaneous movement, an original command and control system (units are organised into brigades commanded by characters) and fog of war rules. It also featured balanced magic and troop choice systems. However the balance within the combat system reduced the opportunity to generate dramatic victories.

Much like Warhammer, the game had its own fantasy world, called Vortimax, in which the battles were imagined to take place. There was also a related range of Fantasy Warlord miniatures cast by Alternative Armies, and a magazine called Red Giant.

The game went out of print 18 months after first publication. Some supplements were expected, such as Armies of Vortimax (expected in 1992) Besieged or Fantasy Warlord Command Pack, but none were released. Only two issues of Red Giant magazine were released. Folio Works Ltd. was dissolved on 11 February 1993.

== Publication history ==
Gary Chalk and Ian Bailey created Fantasy Warlord (1990) to compete with Games Workshop's Warhammer Fantasy Battle.

== The Rulebook ==
=== Content ===
Fantasy Warlord is a single softback book of 192-pages mostly printed in black and white with a Gary Chalk front cover. The book is divided in two parts: the first one covers the game's rules and the second part describes the fantasy world of Vortimax, where the battles take place. 16 pull-out soft cards are attached at the back of the book, one for each racial type plus templates and orders counters.

The book contains many illustrations from Gary Chalk and photographs that illustrate troop's formations, movements, etc.

Determining the abilities of troop is easy: you choose their morale class (A = veterans, B = trained or C = militia) weapons and armour from 11 different races (Human, Elves, Dwarfs, Orcs...). Monsters (flying or not), pack animals and daemons were also available. More races were expected in the supplement Armies of Vortimax.

Generation of heroes or wizards is more time-consuming. There are six types of characters: Warrior Heroes, Priests, Warrior Priests, Magic-users, Thieves and Discipline Masters. Skills and attributes are determined by their level of experience: they could be Minor, Major or Master.

Nearly sixty magic artifacts or weapons and more than 100 spells are available to equip characters.

Each turn is divided into 11 phases. Unlike Warhammer Fantasy Battle, movements are made simultaneously, the players using counters to issue orders. Units are organised into brigades which are commanded by characters. As the game progresses, characters gradually lose control of their brigades, as they would do in real battlefield.

The combat system does not rely solely on random results and copious dice rolling, but rather emphasises strategy and tactics, balanced races, and unit control in order to determine the outcome of a battle.

The book was sold $29.99 in the United States and £13,95 in Great Britain.

==== Book One: The Rules ====
The first part of the rulebook is divided into 12 chapters:

- Introduction
- Creating an army
- Army organisation
- Into battle
- Orders
- Movement
- Battlefield terrain
- Missile fire
- Combat
- Morale
- Magic
- Tactical hints & terrain generation

==== Book Two: The World of Vortimax ====
The second part of the rulebook offers a background for Fantasy Warlord and contains descriptions of geography, history and realms of Vortimax and races that could be played.

=== Supplements ===
At least 3 supplements were anticipated, but none of them were printed.

- Armies of Vortimax, expected in 1992 and already announced in The Games Quarterly Catalog 1991 Christmas Edition
- Besieged, adding rules for war machines and siege
- Fantasy Warlord Command Pack

==== High Command ====
A science-fiction skirmish game probably based on Fantasy Warlord's system, High Command, was expected in 1992 but never released. A small miniatures range was available alongside that of Fantasy Warlord. Those science-fiction figures are currently available from SHQ miniatures (Space Ratten, Saurian Militia and Human Earth Guard)

== Critical Reaction ==
Fantasy Warlord was not well received by critics, citing problems ranging from the racial-types not affecting melee, movement being overly complicated, and the cover artwork being "garish".

According to Gary Chalk in a recent interview, producing Fantasy Warlord cost him a lot of money and stress. Ian Bailey and he misjudged the market dominated by Games Workshop's products and gamers did not well receive a game that used pseudo-military tactics to determine the outcome of fantasy battles.

In addition to this, the launch coincided with the release of Grenadier's Fantasy Warriors wargame.

== Reviews ==
- Casus Belli #64

== Red Giant magazine ==
Red Giant was a fantasy magazine published by Folio Works Ltd. which covered historical or fantasy wargamers, role-players, computer games, play by mail, or live role-playing. Unlike White Dwarf (WD) published by its competitor Games Workshop, Red Giant was not intended to support exclusively Fantasy Warlord or High Command games, but was a response to what Games Workshop and other editors did to the business, according to the company.

Just like White Dwarf did in early ages of its existence, Red Giant made room for many games, such as AD&D, Runequest, Call of Cthulhu, Warhammer Fantasy Role-play and many others.

Actually, Red Giant was a sarcastic title, the exact opposite of White Dwarf, run by Games Workshop. In his first editorial, Tom Sage described WD as "[one of the] magazines exclusive to their product range."

The magazine went out of print after only two issues.

=== Red Giant volume 1 number 1 ===
In this issue...

1. Words of Wisdom - Editorial by Tom Sage
2. Brymstone - A role-playing city-setting imagined by Robert Dale with David Grice, plus stats for AD&D and Runequest
3. Mummerset Revisited - Background for Call of Cthulhu by Marcus L. Rowland
4. Dreams & Role-playing - John Treadaway proposes new dimensions for role-playing adventure
5. A Game of Chess - Fantasy Fiction by D.C. Pedgrift
6. Escape to Arnesdon - A table-top or role-playing campaign by Gary Chalk
7. The Silver Moon - A tavern tussle for AD&D and Warhammer Fantasy Role-play by Harold Cheese with photographs from Gary Chalk's collection
8. Clash of Champions - Heroic single combat for Fantasy Warlord and other table-top rules by Ian Bailey
9. Sunstroke - SF skirmish scenario with stats for Warhammer 40,000 and Laserburn by Rowena Dell

=== Red Giant volume 1 number 2 ===
In this issue...

1. The Brymstone Campaign - Robert Dale presents a series of episodes set in and around the town of Brymstone with stats for AD&D and Runequest
2. Not much Drinkin' Goin' On - Taprhum Korrespondent explains the attraction of bar room brawls
3. Boo! Hurrah! Scribble, Whinge. - Tom Sage reviews your letters
4. Dogs of War - Background for mercenaries in fantasy role-playing and table-top games by D.C. Pedgrift
5. Treachery - A Fantasy Warlord Mercenary scenario by Ian Bailey
6. Celtic Conversions - Practical tips on simple figure conversions by Mark Allen
7. The Library of Altinum - An adventure for AD&D by Jon Chandler
8. The Rock Shark Caper - Introducing Serb Cravatte, Cosmit-i in a solve-it-yourself investigation by D.C. Pedgrift
9. Money, Money, Money - Jim Webster's template scenario offers characters quick cash but at a price
10. In Depth Review - Gary Elison reviews Fantasy Warlord

== Miniatures Range ==
Folio Works launched a full range of 28 mm metal miniatures simultaneously with the publication of the rulebook, produced under license exclusively by Alternative Armies. Some of them have been sculpted by Bob Olley (it is confirmed that FW 8 Dwarfs, FW 5 Urucks and FW 9 Ogres have been designed by him).

Miniatures were sold in two kind of packages: a traditional blister carding and a less common shrink-wrap packing which offer a better view and protection of the miniatures during shipping. They were distributed in the United States and the United Kingdom.

The range uses two different codification: one for the characters (heroes and wizards) and troops in "classic" blister packs which consists of five digit and a second kind of code for the troops, shields and weapons prefixed with FW letters and followed by two digit, the first one designing the range (for instance: 8 for dwarfs).

Characters were sold individually with a weapon and a shield when appropriate. Troops were sold by two to five miniatures per blister, shields and weapons were cast separately to let the player chooses his troop's weapons easily. Single miniature blisters were sold £0.80 (£1.50 for bigger miniatures such as Ogre Hero), Multipacks £2.95 and Weapon packs £1.50.

Folio Works also sold different sort of pre-cut bases and multi-bases as announced in the rulebook page 8, but there is no evidence those bases have ever been released.

When Folio Works went out of business around 1992, the rights to the miniatures were acquired by Mayhem Miniatures, and later by Kennington Miniatures and then later by "SHQ" and some of the miniatures are still available to purchase online (mainly Ogres and Urucks, also scenery packs).

Alternative Armies still has the original moulds and some of the miniatures, if not all from the classic blisters range, can be cast on demand.

On 20 July 2017, Alternative Armies officially announced the availability on their website of classic blisters range.

=== Classic blisters range ===
==== Multipack Troops ====
- 10000 Merchant Kingdoms Soldiers (5)
- 10300 Soldiers of Carylls (5)
- 10400 Scarlet Empire Soldiers (5)
- 11000 High Elves (5)
- 11500 Wood Elves (5)
- 12000 Dwarf Warriors (5)
- 13000 Western Goblins (5)
- 14000 Western Orc Uruks (5)
- 14600 Eastern Orcs (5)
- 16100 Ogres (2)

==== Characters ====
- 20000 Hero of the Merchant Kingdoms
- 20400 Hero of the Scarlet Empire
- 20300 Hero of the Carylls
- 20910 Western Wizard
- 20911 Eastern Wizard
- 20940 Western Warrior Priest
- 22000 Dwarf Hero
- 22910 Dwarf Wizard
- 23000 Western Goblin Hero
- 23910 Western Goblin Wizard
- 24000 Western Orc Hero
- 24910 Western Orc Wizard
- 24901 Eastern Orc Hero
- 24950 Western Orc Discipline Master
- 21000 Elven Hero
- 26000 Ogre Hero (sold with at least 3 different sort of weapons)

==== Weapons Pack ====
- 30001 Western Weapons
- 30002 Eastern Weapons
- 30003 Dwarf Weapons
- 30004 Goblin + Orc Weapons
- 30005 Elven Weapons
- 40001 Good Orientated Shields
- 40002 Evil Orientated Shields

=== Skinpacking blisters range ===
- FW 1/1 Western Men-at-Arms BS (mixed bows and axe with shield) (3)
- FW 1/2 Northern Barbarians (3)
- FW 1/3 Men-at-Arms (?) (there is no evidence this blister has ever been released)
- FW 2/1 Wood Elves (3)
- FW 3/1 High Elves (3)
- FW 3/2 High Elves (?) (there is no evidence this blister has ever been released)
- FW 4/1 Eastern Orcs BS (with bows) (3)
- FW 4/2 Eastern Orcs (3)
- FW 5/1 Western Orcs BS (with bows) (3)
- FW 5/2 Uruck Command (2)
- FW 5/3 Uruck Warriors 1 (2)
- FW 5/4 Uruck Warriors 2 (2)
- FW 5/5 Uruck Warriors 3 (2)
- FW 5/6 Uruck Warriors 4 (2)
- FW 6/1 Eastern Goblin Bowmen (3)
- FW 6/2 Armoured Pigriders (2)
- FW 6/3 Unarmoured Pigriders (2)
- FW 7/1 Western Goblins BS (with bows) (3)
- FW 8/1 Dwarf Xbows (3)
- FW 8/2 Dwarf Gunners (3)
- FW 8/3 Dwarfs in Mail (3)
- FW 8/4 Dwarfs in Mail & Plate (3)
- FW 8/5 Dwarfs in Plate (3)
- FW 9/1 Ogre Hero (1)
- FW 9/2 Ogre Necromancer (1)
- FW 9/3 Ogre Hunter (1)
- FW 9/4 Ogre Warrior (1)
- FW 20/1 Small Kite Shields (Dwarf shields) (15)
- FW 20/2 Dwarf Weapons (12)
- FW 20/3 Large Round Shields (9)
- FW 20/4 Small Round Shields (15)

=== Fantasy Warlord Scenery Packs ===
Western Warrior Priest (20940) and resin scenery shrine (505)

Five resin scenery packs have been released and were cataloged in the Games Quarterly Catalog (with a typo: Barrels is spelled Varrels) and advertised and pictured in the first issue of Red Giant magazine. Some of them are also depicted in the rulebook, alongside hero figures. Each pack was sold for £2.95. This range may still be available online at who bought MBM who bought Kennington who bought some of Folio's ranges, recently these items which mayhem had added to their fantasy range have been purchased by scotia grendel and will be rereleased in early 2020 alongside the full mayhem fantasy range (also included will be the unreleased wall and fence sections as well)

- 501 Stone Walls (5)
- 502 Wooden Fences (5)
- 503 Rune Stones (5)
- 504 Barrels and Boxes (1)
- 505 Shrine (1)

It seems that more items were available, such as wooden fence or wall stone corners, damaged walls, etc. and are still sold by Kennington.

=== Uncatalogued range ===
Alternative Armies also released between 1991 and 1992 according to the slotta's copyright an unknown number of uncatalogued Fantasy Warlord blisters. Unlike the 'official' range each blister pack contains 10 miniatures: 9 troops and one leader.

- LOL 001 ?
- LOL 002 ?
- LOL 003 ?
- LOL 004 ?
- LOL 005 Sharpes Longbows - Elves (10)
- LOL 006 ?
- LOL 007 Smollett's Southearts - Halflings (10)
- LOL 008 Erlangen's Brigand Band - Humans (10)
- LOL 009 ?
- LOL 010 Anaria's Amazons (10)

It is unclear if this extra range was officially commercialised by Folio Works or cast and sold by Alternative Armies on its own initiative.

=== Erin and other miniatures range from Alternative Armies ===
Alternative Armies also sold Erin - The Game of Celtic Myth Miniatures, Shia Khan or Orcish Horde blisters mentioning that they were part of Folio Works and Fantasy Warlord's range of miniatures. It is unclear why they used Folio Works' trademark on the back of their blisters at that time.
