= Nuclear Blaze (video game) =

Action-adventure video game

- Developer: Deepnight Games
- Publishers: Deepnight Games; Red Art Games
- Producer: Sébastien Bénard
- Designer: Sébastien Bénard
- Writers: Sébastien Bénard; Alexis Barroso
- Composer: Enrique Martin
- Engine: Heaps.io
- Platforms: Microsoft Windows; PlayStation 4; Nintendo Switch; Linux
- Release: Windows; October 18, 2021; PS4, Switch; April 28, 2023
- Genre: Action-adventure
- Mode: Single-player

Nuclear Blaze is action-adventure game developed and published by Deepnight Games. It was released for Windows through Steam on October 18, 2021, and was launched for PlayStation 4 and Nintendo Switch on April 28, 2023. In the game, players take control of a firefighter investigating a military facility. The firefighter must use their hose to put out the fires located inside, while searching for survivors and leaning about the purpose of the base. The game received mixed reviews on release.

== Gameplay ==
Nuclear Blaze is a 2D side-scrolling action-adventure game. Players take control of a firefighter air-dropped into a burning forest. After stumbling upon a nearby military facility, the firefighter must enter the base and extinguish the flames within. Gameplay is designed in the platforming style, and contains a number of metroidvania elements. The firefighter possesses a hose which is used to extinguish the constantly expanding flames, and can dodge various obstacles such as burning debris and exploding walls. The amount of water that the hose can spray is limited, and can be refilled at various stations located throughout the facility. In addition, the flames can also be put out using fire extinguishers left behind by the military. The game is divided into twenty levels, and as the player progresses, they can discover and rescue survivors while finding notes that help them solve the mystery behind the facility and discover how the fire began.

== Development ==
Nuclear Blaze was first conceived at the Ludum Dare game jam, where it was completed and entered into the competition within forty-eight hours, and met with a positive reception. Developer Sébastien Bénard was originally an employee of Motion Twin, and a leading designer of the studio's title Dead Cells. Bénard released Nuclear Blaze through his company Deepnight Games, and sought to develop a title that his own child could play. As a result, the game was released alongside the addition of a "Kid Mode" with child-friendly rules and mechanics.

== Reception ==
Reception

Aggregate score
Aggregator	Score
Metacritic	(PC) 74/100 (PS4) 76/100 (XONE) 79/100 (NS) 80/100

Review scores
Publication	Score
Jeuxvideo.com	14/20
Nintendo Life	8/10
Nintendo World Report	9/10
Push Square	5/10
Shacknews	8/10

According to the review aggregator website Metacritic, the PC version of Nuclear Blaze received "mixed or average" reviews, while the console versions received "generally favorable reviews".

Shacknews praised the soundtrack and the accessibility provided by the difficulty options, but said that the game was on the shorter side. Jeuxvideo.com praised the artstyle and atmosphere, and appreciated that the game could be played by children and adults, but disliked the short playtime.
