= Highway 2000 =

Highway 2000 may refer to:

- Highway 2000 (Jamaica), a Jamaican highway system
- Highway 2000 (video game), a 1995 racing video game
- Highway 2000 (board game), a 1981 board game
