= BulkyPix =

French game developer and publisher (2008–2016)

Bulkypix
- Company type: Société par actions simplifiée
- Industry: Video game development and publishing
- Founded: January 12, 2009 (registration)
- Headquarters: Vélizy-Villacoublay, France
- Key people: Olivier Pierre (CEO); Vincent Dondaine (COO); Élodie Martinaud (VP Prod); Roch Roustan (CFO); Bertrand Pierre (VP Sales)
- Revenue: €2,589,000 (2014)
- Net income: €−871,900 (2014, loss)
- Total equity: €1,681,700 (2014)
- Number of employees: 27 (2014)

BulkyPix was a French company specializing in the development and publishing of video games, founded in December 2008 and dissolved in August 2016. The company published over 200 games, primarily for the mobile market and also for web browsers and PC. It went into liquidation in August 2016.

Notable successes include the games My Brute, Saving Private Sheep, Autumn Dynasty, The Sandbox, Type:Rider, Joe Dever's Lone Wolf, Penumbear and Please, Don't Touch Anything.

== History ==
BulkyPix was founded in December 2008 by former employees of Vivendi Games Mobile. BulkyPix was managed by a management committee. The company began by developing and publishing games on the iPhone before diversifying.

Starting in 2010, the company had an office in San Francisco. The American market accounted for over 40% of the company's business. In early January 2011, the company acquired the studio Uacari.

18 months after the company was founded, Bulkypix raised its first round of funding with Oterma, an investment holding company in SMEs. The goal was to expand the game catalog and accelerate research and development. In 2012, for the same purpose, Axa Private Equity (renamed Ardian in 2013) became a shareholder in the company. That same year, the company announced a budget of several million dollars for independent developers.

The company began judicial restructuring proceedings on March 29, 2016, and without finding a buyer, it went into liquidation in August 2016.

== Activities ==
=== Developer and publisher ===
BulkyPix's main activity was the development and publishing of video games. Among its original licenses created and developed in-house, its most famous games include Hysteria Project, My Brute, and Saving Private Sheep. The list of the most famous published games of the company also includes Babel Rising in 2009, Pix'n Love Rush in 2010, Another World: 20th Anniversary Edition and PyramidValley Adventure in 2011, Autumn Dynasty and The Sandbox in 2012, CandyMeleon and Type:Rider in 2013.

=== Service and consulting activities ===
One of BulkyPix's main activities was creating games and applications for clients:

- Licensed games: Tout le monde veut prendre sa place Online, Questions pour un champion Online, Fort Boyard, Le Village de Calimero, Le Petit Nicolas: La Grande Course;
- Advergames: EDF, Veolia, Siemens, Hachette, Française des Jeux, M6, France Télévisions;
- Serious games: recruitment game for the French Navy, awareness game for CODAH, learning game for the Association for Research in Cardiology from Fetus to Adult;
- Others: official applications for the Louvre Museum, the Musée Fabre, the Charles de Gaulle Foundation.

=== Research and development ===
BulkyPix worked on several research and development projects in the field of interactivity and video games. In 2011, a research project on interactive video on smartphones was funded by an innovation grant from Oséo. BulkyPix collaborated with the Institut de recherche en informatique de Toulouse (IRIT) on topics such as augmented reality and geolocation. In 2012, the company led the "Polymathic" project labeled by Cap Digital as part of the call for projects "Digitization and valorization technologies for cultural, scientific, and educational contents" developed in partnership with CNAM, Kylotonn, MocapLab, and XediX.
