= Turbofire =

Game supplement

Turbofire is a 1984 supplement published by AutoVentures for Car Wars, Battlecars, and Highway 2000.

== Gameplay ==
Turbofire is a near-future vehicular-combat scenario involving the Challenge Cup Can-Am Duel-Racing.

== Publication history ==
Turbofire was written by Aaron Allston, with a cover by David Martin, and illustrations by Denis Loubet, and was published by Task Force Games in 1984 as a 32-page book.

== Reception ==
Jerry Epperson reviewed Turbofire in Space Gamer No. 70. Epperson commented that "As a scenario, it is interesting to play . . . once. After that, Turbofire's true value to the autoduel enthusiast is in what remains: an excellent racing system. Where the players develop the racing vehicles, Turbofire provides the fuel for running those races, and will continue to do so long after the checkered flag has been dropped at Millenium Park."

Marcus L. Rowland reviewed Turbofire for White Dwarf #56, giving it an overall rating of 8 out of 10, and stated that "I think it would be possible to simplify some of the game mechanics to speed play and ensure that everyone gets involved in the action, but this would lessen realism. The conversion advice and new vehicle components are useful features of an excellent debut."
