= Curse of the pharaohs (disambiguation) =

The curse of the pharaohs, also known as the mummy's curse or the pharaoh's curse, is a curse alleged to be cast upon anyone who disturbs the mummy of an ancient Egyptian, especially a pharaoh.

The curse of the pharaohs, mummy's curse, or pharaoh's curse may also refer to:

== Film and television ==
- The Mummy's Curse, a 1944 American horror film
- Pharaoh's Curse (film), a 1957 American horror film
- "The Pharaoh's Curse" (The Twilight Zone), an episode of the 2002–03 American TV series The Twilight Zone

== Other uses ==
- The Curse of the Pharaohs (novel), a 1981 novel by Elizabeth Peters
- The Pharaoh's Curse (video game), a 1983 video game
- "Curse of the Pharaohs", a song by Mercyful Fate on their 1983 album Melissa

== See also ==
- The Curse of the Mummy's Tomb (disambiguation)
