= Hell on Wheels (supplement) =

Board game supplement

Hell on Wheels is a 1984 supplement published by AutoVentures for Car Wars, Battlecars, and Highway 2000.

== Gameplay ==
Hell on Wheels is a solitaire scenario for auto-combat games making use of a numbered paragraph system instead of a gamemaster.

== Reception ==
Jerry Epperson reviewed Hell on Wheels in The Space Gamer No. 70. Epperson commented that "Hell On Wheels gets a reserved recommendation. The bottom line is, if you like solitaire games and own one or more of the auto-combat boardgames that this module is primarily written for, then it can be a lot of fun. However, I cannot recommend this module to those interested in an abstract auto-combat system, because the one found here is too vague in several important areas to be worth the price tag alone."
