= AlphaBounce =

2010 video game

- Logo depicting the in-game paddle
- Developer: Motion Twin
- Publisher: Mad Monkey Studio
- Platform: Nintendo DSi
- Release: EU: 9 April 2010; NA: 12 April 2010
- Genre: Action
- Mode: Single-player

AlphaBounce is an action game developed by Motion Twin and published by Mad Monkey Studio for the Nintendo DSi's DSiWare service in April 2010. Similar to the video games Breakout and Arkanoid, the player uses a paddle to knock a ball into blocks to clear them from a playing field. They control one of three characters, progressing through levels across a map in order to escape a mining colony. The title has more than 25 million procedurally generated levels. It is an adaptation of a free-to-play browser game of the same name, offering unlimited play that was not available in the original version.

The game has received generally positive reviews and was praised as an exemplary clone of Breakout and Arkanoid as well as for its value in the Nintendo DSi store. Multiple publications have considered AlphaBounce among the best DSiWare games. Criticism focused on long load times, confusing power-ups, and occasionally tedious gameplay.

== Gameplay ==
AlphaBounce gameplay takes place across two vertically stacked displays.

AlphaBounce is an action game where the player uses a paddle to bounce a ball into blocks until they are destroyed. The gameplay is similar to Breakout and Arkanoid. The game has three difficulty levels, with each difficulty represented by a different character. In the game's story, the characters are prisoners on a deep space mining colony who are trying to escape by breaking through the blocks across multiple levels. The first two characters are available for selection from the beginning, while the third must be unlocked. This single-player game uses the Nintendo DSi's touchscreen to control a paddle that manipulates a ball around the play field. AlphaBounce features more than 40 types of blocks, which interact differently with the ball.

The action takes place across the Nintendo DSi's two vertically aligned screens. During play, items will sometimes appear that either help or hinder the player when collected. There are more than two dozen such items with unique effects, such as clearing parts of the map or adding additional balls. There are also obstacles, like enemies that shoot lasers to damage the paddle and cause the player to lose the level. Once the play field has only a few blocks remaining, a weapon may be activated to clear them. Losing all balls will cause the player to lose the level. Once a level is cleared, any locked levels adjacent to it on the map become available to play. On this map, the player is only able to move one space per turn and can find upgrades to either their paddle or ball. The player can also replay previous levels. The game features 25 million procedurally generated levels.

== Development and release ==
AlphaBounce was originally designed as a free-to-play browser game by developer Motion Twin in 2007. Only three levels could be played in a day, allowing players to play more by spending real money. The company eventually took the game offline and archived the source files on GitHub. Another version was later developed by Motion Twin and published by Mad Monkey Studio. In 2010, it was released on the Nintendo DSi's DSiWare download service on April 9 in Europe and April 12 in North America.. The DSiWare version does not have the per-day limitations of the browser game.

== Reception ==
Reception

Aggregate score
Aggregator	Score
Metacritic	78/100

Review scores
Publication	Score
The A.V. Club	B+
Eurogamer	6/10
Gamekult	5/10
IGN	9/10
Nintendo Life	9/10
Nintendo World Report	9/10
Pocket Gamer	2.5/5

AlphaBounce has received generally favorable reviews according to the review aggregation website Metacritic. It is considered one of the best DSiWare games by Nintendo World Report writer Neal Ronaghan, GamesRadar+ writer Andrew Hayward, IGN staff, and Nintendo Power staff, with Ronaghan hoping to see it re-released on the Wii U's Virtual Console.

Critics such as IGN writer Daemon Hatfield and NintendoLife writer Marcel van Duyn considered AlphaBounce a fresh take on the Arkanoid and Breakout formula, with van Duyn calling it the best Arkanoid clone ever made. The A.V. Club staff called the game a "pleasant surprise". They praised its unexpected concept while expressing a desire to see it on the iPhone, lamenting that it is restricted to the obscure DSiWare store. Ronaghan felt the game distinguished itself from Arkanoid by adding role-playing elements, comparing it favorably to Puzzle Quest: Challenge of the Warlords, a novel match-3 game that combined role-playing elements. Hayward felt that AlphaBounce was a more unique Breakout clone than other games on the Nintendo DS, praising the title for the breadth of its content. Nintendo Power writer Phil Theobald found the game similarly deep, appreciating how much it expanded on the Arkanoid formula.

Hatfield praised the game’s extensive content for its low price, writing that repeat play with multiple characters and the ease of re-trying a failed level are enjoyable. Страна игр writer Alexey Nikitin felt that its price was generous, believing that it could be sold as a full-priced Nintendo DS game. Joker writer Navi also compared it to Puzzle Quest. The writer appreciated that the DSi version of the game dropped the free-to-play elements of the browser version, while noting that some content felt like filler.

M! Games staff criticized AlphaBounce, noting that the gameplay became too chaotic and hard to follow when several power-ups dropped at once. Pocket Gamer’s Mike Rose felt that the concept was interesting but criticized the power-ups as hard to distinguish. Furthermore, he condemned details such as the fragile ship and long load times. Gamekult writer Boulapoire also praised the game's concept but had difficulty with the game's confusing power-ups and long load times. Eurogamer’s Kristan Reed praised the game’s inventive ideas and bold scope but felt its sheer number of levels made progression tedious and demanded more patience than it was worth.
