= Battlecars (video game) =

1984 video game

- Developer: SLUG
- Publishers: Games Workshop; Summit Software
- Designers: SLUG; Julian Gollop
- Platform: ZX Spectrum
- Release: 1984: Games Workshop; 1987: Summit
- Genre: Vehicular combat
- Modes: Multiplayer, Single-player

Battlecars is a vehicular combat game released for the ZX Spectrum in 1984. It is based on Games Workshop's miniature wargame, Battlecars. The game is set in 2084 in a future where road accidents have been eliminated by technology, and the world is relatively bloodless; however, people now entertain themselves by drivers using 20th century automobiles in violent, gladiatorial contests.

== Gameplay ==
Up to two players battle each other or the computer with vehicles that use an assortment of armor, weapons, and other components including missiles, mines, machine guns, lasers, oil, and smoke. Players can fight their cars on a racetrack, in an arena (the Autodrome), or on the streets of Slug City. On the racetrack, players navigate through a narrow circuit, competing primarily against rough terrain and a clock. The Autodrome is a bare arena where two cars can focus on battling each other. Slug City is a townscape where cars could battle each other on narrow streets. A player can play against the computer or a second player in either the racetrack or Autodrome; however, players can only play each other in Slug City.

Gameplay screenshot

Except for when racing on the racetrack, the primary goal of the game is to find your opponent and destroy their car. Players can take advantage of gas stations and service garages to obtain fuel or repairs, but using either makes a player vulnerable to attack from their opponent. A notable gameplay element at the time of the game's release in 1984 was that cars would realistically "drift" when they tried to turn at a high speed.

When playing a game, players are presented a screen that shows the area in which they are driving their car, a map of the entire venue, the current speed and fuel of their car, any damage it receives, and information about available weapons. When there are two players, each player has their own playing screen on the computer monitor. The game is played using twelve keys on a keyboard to control each car and its weapons. The game has eight car configurations from which players could choose. Battlecars also comes with a program, Designer, which allows players to customize the vehicles they want to use in battle.

== Development ==
Loading screen

Battlecars was developed for the ZX Spectrum by SLUG (a Harlow co-operative of programmers who formerly worked for Red Shift) using BASIC. Julian Gollop notably developed the Designer program which allows players to edit the cars in the game. Games Workshop released Battlecars as a computer game for the ZX Spectrum in 1984. The game came with a sixteen-page instruction manual. Summit Software re-released the game in 1988.

== Reception ==
Roger Kean previewed Battlecars in Crash #9 (October 1984), calling it "rather more straightforward than one would expect from a company so immersed in the occult", and described the handling of the game's high speed vehicles "quite alarmingly realistic".

Kevin Westbury reviewed Battlecars for White Dwarf #60, giving it an overall rating of 8 out of 10, and stated that "All in all, Battlecars is fast, furious and great fun, and manages to combine simple operations with quite complex play, where only the best drivers and the surest shots will survive."

Representative of the game's positive reception, Bob Wade reviewed Battlecars for Personal Computer Games, calling the game "a bleak view of an automative future but terrific to play".

Representative of the game's negative reception, Computer and Video Games was critical of Battlecars, saying "It's one thing to have a good idea for a game, but another one to actually write the program." Your Sinclair elaborated on this criticism a few years later by noting "the horrid thing kept crashing on me."
