= Flintloque =

Flintloque is a Historo-Fantasy Skirmish miniatures wargame based on the Napoleonic Wars.

== Publication history ==
It was created and written by Mac Coxhead and Steve Blease and it was published by Alternative Armies in 1995. The initial release of Flintloque 1st edition was followed up by Deadloque (Death in the Snow - The Undead) and then Grapeshotte (rules for artillery and other weapons in Flintloque). Flintloque then spawned a mass battle level game called Slaughterloo, written by Mike Roberts in 1998, that is set in the same game world as Flintloque. Presently in its second edition the core game of Flintloque was re-written by Mike Roberts and Anthony Spencer Williams into Flintloque Reloaded in 2002. Alternative Armies has also produced a Historo-Fantasy Naval game called Trafalgore, which is compatible with Flintloque Reloaded.

The related game Dresda was published in 1995.

== Gameplay ==
While the history of the Napoleonic wars are largely held to, the setting is a fantasy world (Valon) in which all the countries are inhabited by different fantasy races. Napoleon himself is represented by the Elven Emperor Mordred, who changed the face of warfare when he discovered gunpowder with the help of his god, Buon-Partee. His main foe the Duke of Wheeling-Turn is an Orc based largely on the Duke of Wellington.

Unlike most fantasy settings, the races aren't seen as intrinsically "good" or "evil", although most of the traditional "monsters" are just opposing the Elven Empire there are no "traditional sides". These foes range from Orcs and Goblins to Ratmen and Dogmen along with many others.

== Reception ==
A review in Polish magazine Magia i Miecz noted how the game moves extremely quickly because of the small number of models used during a game.

Michał Nowakowski, reviewed the game, which is called "Szczelba" in Polish, for video game magazine Świat Gier Komputerowych calling it one of the most interesting battle systems.

Neil Fawcett for Wargames Journal said that "I'm a big fan of Flintloque. I'm not sure why, many of the figures that I own I find I can never bring myself to field on a gaming table because they are ugly, but I love the idea of the game - Fantasy Napoelonic wargaming somehow appeals to me."

Secret Service speculated that figurine games in Poland had many enthusiast, but the games had gone out of fashion by then, feeling that the market did not accept Szczelba (Flintloque) as is what happened with most of those system in the Polish market.

Chris Sherman of Tampa Bay Times noted how Slaughterloo and Flintloque are examples of "simpler, quicker versions of historical games to draw in the young", and noted that they "combine fantasy and Napoleonics, with the dog troops of Saxhunde, battalions of elfin lancers and the Army of the Undead."
