= The Caverns of Kalte =

Third entry in the Lone Wolf gamebook series

- American cover, original release
- Author: Joe Dever
- Illustrator: Gary Chalk
- Cover artist: Gary Chalk (UK); Brian Salmon (UK); Peter Andrew Jones (UK); Don Maitz (USA)
- Language: English
- Series: Lone Wolf
- Genre: Fantasy
- Publisher: Sparrow Books (UK); Beaver Books (UK); Red Fox (UK); Berkley / Pacer (USA)
- Publication date: 1984
- Publication place: United Kingdom
- Media type: Print (Paperback)
- ISBN: 0-425-09357-3
- OCLC: 27055736
- Preceded by: Fire on the Water
- Followed by: The Chasm of Doom

The Caverns of Kalte is the third entry in the award-winning Lone Wolf gamebook series created by Joe Dever.

Dever had always planned on writing at least four as part of his book deal, and had already sketched out the first 12 at the time the series was first commissioned.

== Gameplay ==
With this third book, players will find that having played through the previous books in the series and thus carried characters forward from these books can help. Since each book successfully completed grants an additional discipline and mastery level, certain parts of the book are substantially harder without these bonuses. This same theme continues through each Lone Wolf book in a given series, encouraging readers to either play through the previous books multiple times, or resort to cheating in some capacity.

== Plot ==
After defeating Darklord Zagarna’s invasion, Sommerlund has begun rebuilding and little scars of war remain after one year. Work on rebuilding the Kai Monastery was about to commence when disturbing news from the north came. The merchants returning from summer trading to Kalte told of Brumalmarc, leader of the Ice Barbarian, has fallen to a hunch-backed magician. The description fit Vonotar, the former wizard from the Brotherhood of the Crystal Star, who betrayed Sommerlund and helped the Darklord Zagarna in the invasion and massacre of the Kai Order.

Apparently after his defeat, Vonotar made his way to the frozen wastes of Kalte and to the ice fortress of Ikaya and through deception, managed to trick the Cruel Brumalmarc to adopt him as his magician and thus cost him his life and fortress. News of his survival spread in Sommerlund like wildfire with people demanding he pay for his treachery. The king is obliged to promise that the traitor be brought back and stand trial for his crimes and thus has asked you to go capture and bring him back.

== Awards ==
- Gamebook of the Year 1987
