= Street Fight =

Street Fight may refer to:

- Street fighting, hand-to-hand fighting in public places
- Urban warfare, military conflict in built-up areas
- Street Fight (film), a 2005 documentary about the 2002 Newark, New Jersey mayoral election
- Coonskin (film), a 1975 animated film, re-released under the title Street Fight
- "Street Fight" (song), a 2007 song by Hedley
- Street Fight, a name used for hardcore wrestling-based variations of professional wrestling match types
- Street Fight Radio, an anarchist political comedy radio show and podcast founded in 2011

== See also ==
- Street Fighter (disambiguation)
