= Castlevania: Belmont's Curse =

2026 video game

- European and Japanese cover art by Katsuya Terada
- Developer: Evil Empire (Note: Advisory assistance by Motion Twin)
- Publisher: Konami
- Directors: Emmanuel Nouaille; Yukiko Hokao
- Producer: Tsutomu Taniguchi
- Designer: Sandro Bordier
- Writer: Matthew Willis
- Composers: Daniel Asadi; Yoann Laulan
- Series: Castlevania
- Platforms: Nintendo Switch; PlayStation 5; Windows; Xbox Series X/S
- Release: 15 October 2026
- Genres: Action role-playing, Metroidvania
- Mode: Single-player

Castlevania: Belmont's Curse is a 2026 action role-playing game developed by Evil Empire, with advice from Motion Twin, and published by Konami. It is the 26th main entry of the Castlevania franchise, celebrating its 40th anniversary. Taking place in 1499, over two decades after the events of Castlevania III: Dracula's Curse (1989) and Castlevania: Curse of Darkness (2005), the story follows Rose Belmont, daughter of vampire hunter Trevor Belmont and his wife Sypha Belnades, who ventures into Dracula's castle as it manifests directly in the heart of Paris.

The game returns to the exploration-based design of previous series entries such as Castlevania: Symphony of the Night (1997). Gameplay entails traversing a non-linear map comprising the castle and the surrounding city of Paris, defeating enemies and a variety of bosses to gain experience and unlock abilities, while searching for upgrades and items, to unlock access to more areas. The protagonist equips a variety of weapons and special abilities, including the Belmont family whip, the "Vampire Killer".

Konami was reported to have greenlit numerous entries in their tentpole franchises as part of their return to console and PC game development in 2021, including Castlevania. Belmont's Curse entered production in 2022 and was announced in February 2026. Along with Haunted Castle Revisited (2024), it is the first standalone entry in the franchise since Castlevania: Lords of Shadow 2 (2014). Motion Twin collaborated with Konami and Evil Empire on the title in an advisory role, after they co-developed the Dead Cells: Return to Castlevania (2023) expansion pack.

Castlevania: Belmont's Curse was released on 15 October 2026, for Nintendo Switch, PlayStation 5, Windows and Xbox Series X/S, to positive reviews.

== Gameplay ==
Belmont's Curse is a side-scrolling action-adventure game that follows the non-linear, exploration-focused format of Castlevania games since Symphony of the Night (1997). Players control the main protagonist Rose Belmont, navigating her through a large, auto-filling map divided into multiple areas and sub-areas while acquiring weapons, and defeating various enemies. Belmont's Curse integrates role-playing elements, with Rose able to derive experience points from defeating enemies and bosses which then enable her to level up, increasing her defense and attack attributes, which determine how much damage she takes and deals. These respective traits can also be manually upgraded by collecting red and blue-hued books that correspond to the respective attack and defense stats. Rose lacks access to traditional sub weapons found by breaking objects such as candle sticks and chandeliers, thereby not requiring hearts to use specific items. Instead, these respective abilities are represented as tarot cards Rose possesses, with mana spending abilities consisting of arcana, and equippable weapons being sorted into various classes and types in the Armoury tab of the pause menu, ranging from short-range swords and shields, longer broadswords, long-range spears, whips and fast gauntlets for use in melee combat. In addition to weapons, Rose can find and equip up to three Relics at a time that grant her specific passive attributes improving her attack and defense, the potency of her healing, or enhancing her mana skills. Health is restored by finding items such as meat, performing heals with potion flasks, or finding Mirrors of Life which also function as save points while resetting her flask count. Later in the game, Mirrors of Life also enable Rose to access a hub area known as the Hall of Mirrors, thereby allowing her to use previously activated Mirrors in her current map region as fast travel points. Rose can also find Brave Heart Fragments and Wise Heart Fragments throughout the map, with four of each being required to respectively upgrade her health and mana capacity.

Earlier in the game, further exploration is gated off by a large doorway that require three keys obtained by defeating a set of bosses in the playable regions at that time. Defeating bosses enables Rose to siphon an attribute or power that is stored as an arcanum, available to equip and use as an ability of her own. These arcana can be strengthened by performing 'Works of Mercy' that require the player to satisfy an objective, such as using their ability or spell a certain number of times under specific conditions, upon which the completion grants the player a point that can be allocated towards upgrading the arcana's associated skills. Defeating certain boss characters also grants permanent abilities to Rose, including a specialized whip used by the Fallen which enables her to grapple onto enemies or tether points that can propel her to higher areas and greater distances; a light shield which can be used to parry enemy attacks and projectiles while also clearing specific formations that otherwise obstruct her from reaching certain parts of the area; a mid-air stomp that can be used to attack enemies and break specific block barriers at certain heights to access more of the map; a mid-air dash that can be used for quick horizontal traversal and evading hazards; and a double jump.

== Plot ==
=== Setting and characters ===
Castlevania: Belmont's Curse takes place in 1499 within the series' original timeline, placing it 23 years following the events of Castlevania III: Dracula's Curse (1989), and 20 years after Castlevania: Curse of Darkness (2005). The story takes place in Medieval Paris after being overrun by demonic creatures, when the local bishop requests the services of Trevor Belmont (JB Blanc), the vampire hunter who previously defeated Dracula (Graham McTavish) with his deceased wife Sypha Belnades (Alejandra Reynoso). Trevor enlists the help of their daughter Rose (Abby Trott) who was born shortly before Sypha passed away, inheriting her affliction with Dracula's curse in her right arm, and whom Trevor had trained to succeed him as a vampire hunter. Together, the Belmonts set out to protect the city while attempting to determine what caused the monsters' appearance.

As Rose traverses Paris, she encounters numerous figures seeking to aid or impede her quest, including a mysterious monster terrorizing the city known as "the Fallen" (Ray Chase); Joan of Arc (Erica Lindbeck), and Dracula's various accomplices such as the vampire Carmilla (Dawn M. Bennett), the serpent-headed prophetess Medusa (Melique Berger); Isaac (Liam O'Brien), a devil forgemaster who previously fought Trevor Belmont and seeks redemption for his death during the events of Curse of Darkness; and Death (Aaron LaPlante), Dracula's loyal servant who feeds on souls of the dead.

=== Story ===
Trevor and Rose Belmont arrive in Paris to fight the monsters threatening the city. While exploring the city alone, Rose finds an enchanted doorway obstructing her path and defeats a monster called "The Fallen", whose soul is absorbed into one of the enchanted tarot cards left by Sypha. The Fallen recovers his senses and recounts that he was dispatched alongside two other guardians serving an unknown master, who commanded them to kill innocents and bring their souls to them in the Parisian catacombs. She fights and defeats the other guardians, one being the spirit of Joan of Arc, and the other being Medusa who reveals that the attack on Paris is part of a ritual to revive her master, Lord Dracula.

Taking the guardian keys back to the sewers, Rose unlocks the underground passageway and eventually meets Death, who intended to use Trevor Belmont's blood to complete the resurrection ritual. Death nevertheless incapacitates Rose, drawing from her blood to successfully enact Dracula's revival and the erection of his castle in place of Notre-Dame. Coming to Rose's aide, Trevor covers for Rose to escape as the catacombs cave in, apparently killing him. While Rose grieves her father, the Fallen reveals himself to be Leon Belmont, the progenitor of the Belmont clan and original wielder of the Vampire Killer whip, who was corrupted into his current form and cursed with immortality during a prior encounter with Dracula four centuries earlier. (Note: Following the events of Castlevania: Lament of Innocence (2003))

Encouraged by Leon and Joan to find a way to control Dracula's curse in order to defeat him, Rose makes her way to the castle and encounters Isaac, who briefly duels her before retreating to the clock tower and creating a magic barrier around Dracula's throne room. Rose ventures into and explores the castle, defeating the Count's minions and subduing his servants Talos in the clock tower's eastern access shaft; Brauner in the main hall; and Carmilla in the Library's observatory, all of whom she siphons into her tarot cards. Using Brauner's power, Rose travels into his painting of the Notre-Dame and discovers Death holding a still-alive Trevor captive, as most of his blood was drained for the ritual to revive Dracula. Rose defeats Death, who escapes, and rescues her father. Too weakened to resume his duties, Trevor entrusts the Vampire Killer whip to Rose and she sets out to confront Dracula alone.

The game has three different endings. In the bad ending, Dracula takes control of Rose by activating her curse, defeating her and ending the Belmont lineage. However, if Rose defeats Isaac, lifting the spell he uses to protect Dracula's chambers, she manages to fight and defeat Dracula. In the normal ending, Rose and Trevor escape to safety, but Dracula's curse keeps spreading upon Paris. In the game's true ending, unlocked when Rose manages to overcome Dracula's curse and uses her powers to purify it after his defeat, sacrificing all her cards in the process, the castle disappears and Notre-Dame is restored, saving the city. Knowing that Dracula will eventually return, the Belmonts renew their vow to one day destroy him for good, no matter how long it takes.

== Development ==
In October 2021, Video Games Chronicle reported that publisher Konami was restructuring in preparation of a strategic pivot that would see them refocusing on the production of premium games for console and PC, after a brief period of emphasizing mobile and pachislot titles throughout the mid-2010s. Among the games greenlit included a "reimagining" of the Castlevania series primarily developed by Konami with support from external studios. In 2023, Konami producer Tsutomu Taniguchi acknowledged "excitement and enthusiasm" with regards to a new Castlevania game following numerous compilations for previous entries in the series being released since the late 2010s.

Belmont's Curse was developed by Evil Empire under license from Konami with assistance from Motion Twin in an advisory capacity. The former studio's co-founder Benjamin Laulan approached the publisher during BitSummit in 2022 to secure a Japanese distribution deal for the roguelike Metroidvania title Dead Cells (2018), during which he pitched a collaboration skin for the game based on the Castlevania character Alucard, leading Taniguchi in turn to suggest working together on more significant themed content, leading to Evil Empire being enlisted to produce the Return to Castlevania downloadable expansion, which released in 2023, while also granting them the license to produce a new Castlevania game altogether. The former studios were selected due to Konami's faith in them to deliver a new exploration-based action game that captured the essence of the franchise while innovating. Konami's Tommy Williams confirmed that Belmont's Curse would not adopt any of the roguelike progression gameplay seen in the developers' previous work on Dead Cells, instead being described as a freeform action-exploration title similar to previous Castlevania entries. The game entered development in 2022, with Konami describing the title as the first of multiple new Castlevania projects going forward. Abby Trott and JB Blanc voice Rose and Trevor respectively; other members of the voice cast include Alejandra Reynoso as Sypha Belnades and Graham McTavish as Dracula, reprising their roles from the Castlevania animated series (2017–2021), and Liam O'Brien as Isaac, reprising the role from Castlevania: Curse of Darkness (2005).

== Release ==
Castlevania: Belmont's Curse was announced in February 2026 during a segment of Sony Interactive Entertainment's State of Play presentation focused on upcoming Konami titles, with a first look at gameplay and an accompanying message from producer Tsutomu Taniguchi. The game commemorates the 40th anniversary of the Castlevania franchise, and is the first console entry in the series since Castlevania: Lords of Shadow 2 (2014). It is also the first original traditional 2D installment set in the series' original timeline since Castlevania: Order of Ecclesia (2008). A second trailer premiered during the Xbox Games Showcase in June 2026, confirming the game's release date for most aforementioned platforms. Following the reveal, Konami initially announced that the Nintendo Switch version of the game had been delayed to later in the year, before eventually confirming the following month that it would launch on Switch simultaneously with other platforms. A demo featuring exploration through the opening areas and the first boss encounter with the Fallen, was released on all platforms on 1 October 2026 with the ability to carry over progress into the full release.

Castlevania: Belmont's Curse was released on 15 October 2026 for Nintendo Switch, PlayStation 5, Windows and Xbox Series X/S.

== Reception ==
Reception

Aggregate scores
Aggregator	Score
Metacritic	(NS) 79/100 (PC) 82/100 (PS5) 83/100 (XSXS) 87/100
OpenCritic	96% recommend

Review scores
Publication	Score
Eurogamer	3/5
Game Informer	9.25/10
GameSpot	10/10
GamesRadar+	4/5
Hardcore Gamer	4/5
IGN	8/10
Nintendo World Report	7.5/10
Push Square	7/10
RPGamer	3.5/5
RPGFan	97/100
Shacknews	10/10
The Guardian	3/5
Video Games Chronicle	3/5

Castlevania: Belmont's Curse received "generally favorable" reviews from critics, according to review aggregator website Metacritic, OpenCritic determined that 96% of critics recommended the game.
