= Dead Cells =

2018 video game

- Developer: Motion Twin (Note: Updates and downloadable content developed by Evil Empire since 2019)
- Publishers: Motion Twin; Playdigious (Note: iOS and Android)
- Designers: Sébastien Bénard; Mathieu Capdegelle
- Programmers: Sébastien Bénard; Mathieu Capdegelle; Pascal Péridont; Mathieu Pistol; Christophe Rautou
- Artists: Gwenaël Massé; Noémie Szmrzsik-Cohard; Thomas Vasseur
- Composers: Yoann Laulan; Thomas Chastagnol
- Platforms: Linux; macOS; Nintendo Switch; PlayStation 4; Windows; Xbox One; iOS; Android; PlayStation 5
- Release: Linux, macOS, Nintendo Switch, PS4, Windows, Xbox One; August 7, 2018; iOS; August 28, 2019; Android; June 3, 2020; PlayStation 5; June 29, 2023
- Genres: Roguelike, Metroidvania
- Mode: Single-player

Dead Cells is a 2018 roguelike-Metroidvania game developed by Motion Twin and Evil Empire. The player takes the role of an amorphous creature called the Prisoner. As the Prisoner, the player must fight their way out of a diseased island in order to slay the island's King. The player gains weapons, treasure and other tools through exploration of the procedurally generated levels. Dead Cells features a permadeath system, causing the player to lose all items and other abilities upon dying. A currency called Cells can be collected from defeated enemies, allowing the player to buy permanent upgrades.

Production of Dead Cells began after Motion Twin planned development for a follow-up to their previous browser game Die2Nite. The developers decided to replace the cooperative gameplay of Die2Nite with a single-player experience focused around combat and action. They took inspiration from the Engineer character class from Team Fortress 2, and remade Dead Cells into an action platform game where the player would utilize a variety of combinations of weapons and skills.

The game was released for Linux, macOS, Nintendo Switch, PlayStation 4, Windows, and Xbox One on August 7, 2018. A mobile port for iOS was released on August 28, 2019, and an Android port was released in 2020. A version for PlayStation 5 was added on June 29, 2023. After release, the game was supported with several updates and expansions, with developmental duties handled by Evil Empire. The game received positive reviews from critics, who praised its combat, visuals, and permadeath system. By June 2023, the game had sold over 10 million copies.

== Gameplay ==
A GIF of the Prisoner using the jump and dodge mechanics to get behind a charging enemy

Dead Cells is a 2D side-scrolling "roguevania", a combination of the roguelike and Metroidvania genres. The player controls the Prisoner, an amorphous creature who journeys across an island full of mutated monsters. When the player dies, they lose all weapons and upgrades obtained in a playthrough, excluding a few permanent items. Weapons primarily include swords, bows, shields, and placeable traps that harm enemies that come near them. In combat, the Prisoner can dodge across the ground to avoid the attacks of enemies, or jump over the attacks. Dodging into an enemy's space allows the Prisoner to move through them and attack from behind. When falling from a height, the Prisoner can slam into the ground, allowing them to stun enemies, or allow the Prisoner to fall from heights without getting stunned themselves.

The game's combat is comparable to the Dark Souls series, with difficult enemies possessing certain behaviors the player can learn, and where frequent player-character death is a fundamental part of the game. As they explore a series of levels and fight the creatures within, the player can collect an in-game currency called Cells from defeated foes. Cells can be used to purchase permanent upgrades, such as potions that restore hit points or additional weapons that may be randomly obtained during a playthrough. These Cells can only be spent at the end of a dungeon section; if the player dies before then, they lose all collected Cells. New upgrade options can be found by locating blueprints inside dungeons, which must be taken out of the level to be collected.

Levels are procedurally generated by the merging of predesigned sections in a random configuration, creating dungeons with many different placements of enemies and items. Between dungeons, the player can obtain a limited number of mutations, benefits which grant unique bonuses to the Prisoner's capabilities that last until they die. The player can reforge weapons during this time, giving the reforged weapons new effects during combat. Inside the dungeons, the player can find hidden Power Scrolls, which increase the Prisoner's hit points and improve the damage of weapons depending upon the tool's classification of Brutality, Tactics, or Survival. Dungeons can contain permanent upgrades called Runes, which allow for new methods of travel throughout levels. Runes can be obtained by defeating powerful Elite enemies, and each Rune requires the previous one to obtain the next.

== Plot ==
=== Premise ===
Taking place on an unnamed island, the player character is the Prisoner, (Note: Sometimes referred to as "the Beheaded") an amorphous creature capable of possessing dead bodies located in the depths of the island. While the "head" of the Prisoner is immortal, the bodies it possesses are not, and dying will force the Prisoner to return to the Prisoners' Quarters to find another corpse. The Prisoner does not speak, limiting their interactions with non-player characters (NPCs) to gestures and body language alone. The player is occasionally shown the thoughts of the Prisoner through dialogue boxes.

=== Story ===
The Prisoner awakens in the depths of the island's prison, suffering from amnesia. A soldier encounters the Prisoner and mentions that they can no longer die. The Prisoner tries to escape the prison, but their head is forced back to the depths as soon as its body is destroyed. Between subsequent escape attempts, the Prisoner learns that the island was once a mighty kingdom that fell when a plague known as "The Malaise" transformed most of the kingdom's citizens into mutated monsters.

After escaping the Prisoners' Quarters, the Prisoner decides to kill the island's reclusive King, believing that his death will cause something on the island to "change". While leaving the Quarters, the Prisoner meets with the Collector, a hooded figure that trades Cells in exchange for items and weaponry. After fighting through the island's Malaise-infected locales, the Prisoner reaches the King's throne room and succeeds in slaying the comatose monarch. However, the King's corpse violently explodes in the process, destroying the Prisoner's host body. The Prisoners' head crawls out from the burning fragments of the destroyed throne, where it exits the room through a fountain's drain. The drain leads back to the Prisoners' Quarters, where the resurrected Prisoner ponders the consequences of the King's death.

=== Rise of the Giant ===
The Rise of the Giant downloadable content expands the plot of Dead Cells, providing the game with alternative endings. The Prisoner gains access to a new area of the island, the Cavern, which houses a titanic undead Giant. Upon his defeat, the Giant reveals that the Prisoner is actually the King himself, and blames him for the destruction of the kingdom. After defeating the final boss, the Prisoner can collect Boss Cells, in-game modifiers that are used to increase the difficulty of the game. If the player collects all five Boss Cells and reaches the throne room, they are able to gain access to an additional level called the Astrolab. At the top of the Astrolab, the Prisoner meets the Collector; he tells the Prisoner that he has been trading for Cells in order to create the Panacea, the ultimate cure for the Malaise. Upon producing the Panacea and drinking it, the Collector goes mad and attacks the Prisoner. The Prisoner manages to ingest some of the Panacea before the Collector's defeat, which causes their host body to disappear. Disappointed with the Panacea, the head returns to the Quarters to possess another corpse.

When the Prisoner reaches the throne room again, they discover that the King's body has reappeared undamaged. The head of the Prisoner abandons its host body and attaches to the King's, restoring the Prisoner's memories and allowing him to speak. However, the King's body is infected with the Malaise, and he continues to the Astrolab to face the Collector. This time, upon the Collector's defeat, the Panacea cures the King and "binds his body and soul". The King returns to his throne, where he is confronted by a look-alike of the Prisoner intent on slaying him. The King and the look-alike battle each other in a duel.

=== The Queen and the Sea ===
The Queen and the Sea downloadable content adds three additional levels to the game, as well as an alternative ending. The Prisoner finds a letter inviting them to a meeting in the sewers beneath the prison. When the Prisoner arrives, they meet an aquatic creature called the Fisherman, who offers them a way to escape the island through the kingdom's lighthouse. After the Prisoner finds the Lighthouse Key and meets the Fisherman again at the King's castle, the latter uses his boat to take the Prisoner to the lighthouse. Inside, the Prisoner accidentally knocks over a flaming chandelier, alerting three hostile warriors named Calliope, Euterpe, and Kleio, who are the servants of the island's Queen. The three chase the Prisoner to the top of the now-burning lighthouse, where the Prisoner defeats them in combat. The Prisoner enters the upper chambers of the lighthouse to light its beacon, but the Queen reveals herself and challenges them to a duel. The Prisoner defeats the Queen before throwing her off the lighthouse's balcony, causing an explosion that activates the structure's beacon. The Prisoner uses the beacon to attract a ship passing by the island.

== Development ==
Dead Cells' developer Motion Twin had been creating games for the browser and mobile gaming market since 2001. The studio found that competition in the mobile market required more investment to make profitable games, and decided to switch focus to develop what they considered their "passion project", a game that was "something hardcore, ultra-niche, with pixel art and ridiculous difficulty" that they thought would be a potential risk for gaining player interest.

Motion Twin initially had set out to make a follow-up to their browser game Die2Nite, which was a cooperative tower defense game for up to forty players released in 2008; for most of the game, players would work together to form defenses around a town, and then during the game's night phase, wait to see if the town survived waves of attacks by zombies. Motion Twin wanted to have improve the sequel by allowing players to take actions and fight during the night phase, while implementing free to play mechanics. While this version worked well with large number of players, Motion Twin found it was not very exciting for single players. In 2014, they stripped down the game to a single-player experience between preparation and combat, and took it to an event called the Big Indie Pitch, where the idea came in second place in a contest. Motion Twin decided to remove the preparation phase and focus the game around constant action. The process of figuring out how to keep and work with combat elements took a year up through the end of 2015.

To tighten the gameplay, Motion Twin took inspiration from the Engineer character class from Team Fortress 2, where the use of turrets and other buildable items helps to strengthen the character's abilities, and remade Dead Cells into an action platform game where the player used weapons along with a variety of skills. They did not want players to get used to having a single weapon/skill combination that they used indefinitely, and arranged the roguelike elements to require the player to try out new combinations as they progressed. Motion Twin's producer Steve Filby cited The Binding of Isaac as a significant influence, highlighting its item-driven gameplay. To give the player enough options, the developers crafted about 50 different weapons, using an iterative process in gameplay, graphics, and art to ensure each of these weapons exhibited unique animations or behavior.

Motion Twin opted to use Steam's early access approach to both gauge player interest and to obtain feedback on game features. The team feared the stigma around indie games at the time, fueled by industry speculation of an "indiepocalypse" where too many indie games would cause a collapse of the video game market around 2015, an event which never occurred. Motion Twin did not want to release too early within early access, and made sure the first version available, while about 30 to 40% complete, had tight combat and gameplay controls that players would appreciate. This allowed the team to address balance issues, as the developers did not want to punish players for a specific style of play, and used feedback to address this. Motion Twin planned for the game to spend about a year in early access before its full release, during which time the content was created and incorporated after player feedback on both bug reports and feature suggestions. Lead designer Sébastien Bénard estimated that 40 to 50% of the features in the final game were drawn from feedback during early access.

The plot of Dead Cells was not intended from the beginning. Motion Twin felt that the addition of a story would take away from the action, and wanted to include the most basic narrative possible. As the game progressed through early access, the developers decided to include a minor story after players found their world compelling. Over time, the plot was compiled into a half-French half-English document, and became more and more complex. Although the levels have a number of hints towards the story, Motion Twin withheld some of the details and utilized the nonlinear gameplay to keep the narrative vague, hoping players would piece together the story for themselves.

== Release and expansions ==
Release timeline
2017	Early access
2018	Dead Cells
2019	Rise of the Giant
2020	The Bad Seed
2021	Fatal Falls
2022	The Queen and the Sea
2023	Return to Castlevania

The early access period was launched on May 10, 2017, with support for Windows. Additional support was added for macOS and Linux on June 26, 2018. In November 2017, the game was released on GOG.com as part of their drive to provide an alternate way to purchase games that are in development. In January 2018, Motion Twin announced their plans on console development for the Nintendo Switch, PlayStation 4, and Xbox One, with a release predicted in August 2018 to correspond with the Windows' version leaving early access. Motion Twin does not anticipate creating a sequel, and instead focused on adding a robust modding system for the PC versions to allow players to expand the game following release. Dead Cells was released on August 7, 2018, for Windows, Xbox One, PlayStation 4, and Nintendo Switch. Retail editions were released in August 2018. The base game included Twitch integration at launch, allowing viewers, via the stream's chat, to influence the game, such as voting for which Power Scroll weapon class option the player should take.

Motion Twin released a free downloadable content update to the game called Dead Cells: Rise of the Giant in mid-2019. The developers announced plans to port Dead Cells to mobile devices running iOS and Android, modifying the game's interface to support touch controls as well as remote controllers. The iOS version was released on August 28, 2019, and the Android version was released on June 3, 2020. The game's first paid expansion, Dead Cells: The Bad Seed, was released on February 11, 2020, adding two new biomes, as well as a boss for early game content. The new content included weapons, enemies and game mechanics. On the same day, a new physical special edition of the game, the Prisoner's Edition, was announced for PlayStation 4 and Nintendo Switch, which in addition to the game and DLC, includes the soundtrack, an art book, and a figurine of the player-character. A second paid DLC expansion, Dead Cells: Fatal Falls, was released on January 26, 2021, which added new levels, weapons, and a boss.

Around January 2019, Motion Twin started work on their next title while still developing Dead Cells. When they expanded by hiring more developers, Motion Twin wanted to keep the Dead Cells development team to between eight and ten people to stay a manageable worker cooperative. The team then spun-off a new studio called Evil Empire to help co-develop the game. Motion Twin released a free update on September 16, 2021, titled "Practice Makes Perfect" which added a training room, world map and many other quality of life changes. A free Everyone Is Here update released on November 22, 2021, which introduced skins and mechanics based on characters from other indie games. These games included Hyper Light Drifter, Guacamelee!, Curse of the Dead Gods, Blasphemous, Skul: The Hero Slayer, and Hollow Knight. Celebrating the 20th anniversary of Motion Twin, the developers revealed the third paid expansion titled Dead Cells: The Queen and the Sea, which released on January 7, 2022. Another free content update, Break the Bank, released in March 2022. The update added a new level that can be randomly encountered while playing, which grants the player an opportunity to earn significant sums of gold. On October 26, 2022, Motion Twin released a free boss rush update, which allows the Prisoner to fight the bosses of the game one after another in a new game mode. A free Everyone is Here Vol. 2 update in November 2022 added more homages to other indie games, including Terraria, Hotline Miami, Slay the Spire, Shovel Knight, Risk of Rain, and Katana Zero.

A fourth and final paid expansion, Dead Cells: Return to Castlevania, was released on March 6, 2023. It features characters, weapons, and enemies from the Castlevania series, under license from Konami. This expansion includes a secret level inspired by Symphony of the Night and allows the player to play as Richter Belmont with a move set akin to the Castlevania series. A port for the PlayStation 5 was released on June 29, 2023. Netflix released a mobile version on October 31, 2023, which requires an active Netflix subscription to play and includes all of the previously released DLCs. With the game's 35th patch being released on August 19, 2024, Motion Twin and Evil Empire announced that they had stopped further creative work on Dead Cells. Motion Twin had already transferred their development efforts towards their next game, Windblown, and Evil Empire started work on their own new title. The companies stated that they will continue fixing bugs and making quality-of-life changes.

== Reception ==
Reception

Aggregate score
Aggregator	Score
Metacritic	NS: 89/100; PC: 89/100; PS4: 87/100; XONE: 91/100 iOS: 84/100

Review scores
Publication	Score
Destructoid	9/10
Eurogamer	Recommended
Game Informer	9/10
GameSpot	9/10
HobbyConsolas	93/100
IGN	9.5/10
Nintendo Life	9/10
Push Square	9/10
Shacknews	9/10
The Telegraph	4/5
The Guardian	4/5
TouchArcade	4/5
USgamer	4.5/5
VideoGamer.com	8/10

Dead Cells received positive reviews from critics. The Xbox One version received "universal acclaim", and the PlayStation 4, PC, Nintendo Switch, and iOS versions received "generally favorable" reviews according to review aggregator website Metacritic. Brandin Tyrrel of IGN praised the game for its engaging gameplay premise, and randomized layout, declaring "The placement and order of its levels are Dead Cells' skeletal frame, but the ever-changing layouts and enemy and item placements are the blood that pumps through its heart." The action and combat of Dead Cells received acclaim as "distinct", "fluid", and "agile". Reviewers compared the game to the Dark Souls, Diablo, and Castlevania series due to its difficulty and constantly changing levels, while giving specific praise to the visuals and sound design.

The plot of Dead Cells was criticized, with critics calling it lacking and vague. Kirk Hamilton of Kotaku found the story disappointing, stating "Aside from some sparse worldbuilding, the only story here is the story of moving forward, killing things, and gradually getting better at it". Some commentators considered progression beyond the first few hours as "nebulous", and the game's difficulty "callous". Chris Carter of Destructoid noted the game's difficulty, stating "There's those moments where you have a perfect run with all of the items you prefer. Then you get to a boss you've never seen before and bam – he smashes you to a pulp."

Other critics drew attention to the permadeath feature as a rewarding system, as it provided the player with permanent upgrades, the opportunity to experience all of the game's content, and gain full knowledge of its systems. Neal Ronaghan of Nintendo World Report enjoyed the permadeath feature, saying "Every run is engrossing and fun and when I die, the only thought rushing through my brain is to start over and try again, pushing as far past my previous run as I can."

=== Sales ===
About a year from its early access release, Dead Cells sold over 730,000 units, and exceeded 850,000 units just prior to its full release. By May 2019, within ten months of its full release, Dead Cells had accumulated sales of two million units. In March 2021, Dead Cells had sold 5 million copies during the announcement of their third DLC. By June 2023, Dead Cells had sold over 10 million copies.

=== Awards and accolades ===
Year	Award	Category	Result	Ref.
2017	2017 Ping Awards	Best Indie Game	Nominated	
2017	IGN Best of 2017	Best Action Game	Nominated	
2018	2018 Golden Joystick Awards	Best Indie Game	Won	
2018	2018 Golden Joystick Awards	Best Visual Design	Nominated	
2018	2018 Golden Joystick Awards	Ultimate Game of the Year	Nominated	
2018	The Game Awards 2018	Best Action Game	Won	
2018	The Game Awards 2018	Best Independent Game	Nominated	
2018	Gamers' Choice Awards	Fan Favorite Indie Game	Nominated	
2018	Australian Games Awards	Independent Game of the Year	Nominated	
2018	New York Game Awards	Best Indie Game	Won	
2018	National Academy of Video Game Trade Reviewers Awards	Control Design, 2D or Limited 3D.	Won	
2018	15th British Academy Games Awards	Original Property	Nominated	
2019	SXSW Gaming Awards	Excellence In Gameplay	Nominated	
2019	SXSW Gaming Awards	Most Promising New Intellectual Property	Nominated	
2019	Italian Video Game Awards	Best Indie Game	Nominated	
2020	Pégases Awards	Best Mobile Game	Won	
2020	Pégases Awards	Best Game-as-a-Service	Won	

=== Legacy ===
In June 2023, developer Motion Twin announced that an animated series, titled Dead Cells: Immortalis, was in the works by French animation studio Bobbypills, the studio behind their animated trailers, and was released on June 19, 2024, by French animation network, ADN (Animation Digital Network) and lasted for 10 episodes. An English dub of the show was released on October 7. In August 2024, the roguelike first-person shooter Roboquest released an update featuring characters and items from Dead Cells, and in September 2025, BlazBlue Entropy Effect added the Prisoner as a playable character.

In February 2026, Evil Empire and Motion Twin were revealed to be co-developing on Castlevania: Belmont's Curse under license from Konami, following their prior collaboration on the Return to Castlevania expansion for Dead Cells. Belmont's Curse is the first 2D action role-playing entry of the Castlevania franchise since Castlevania: Order of Ecclesia (2008), produced in commemoration of the series' 40th anniversary.
