= The Chasm of Doom =

Book by Joe Dever

- American cover, original release
- Author: Joe Dever
- Illustrator: Gary Chalk
- Cover artist: Gary Chalk (UK) uncredited (UK); Brian Salmon (UK); Peter Andrew Jones (UK; Richard Corben (USA)
- Language: English
- Series: Lone Wolf
- Genre: Fantasy
- Publisher: Sparrow Books (UK); Beaver Books (UK); Red Fox (UK); Berkley / Pacer (USA)
- Publication date: 1985
- Publication place: United Kingdom
- Media type: Print (Paperback)
- ISBN: 0-425-08419-1
- OCLC: 12857402
- Preceded by: The Caverns of Kalte
- Followed by: Shadow on the Sand

The Chasm of Doom is the fourth book in the award-winning Lone Wolf book series created by Joe Dever and illustrated by Gary Chalk.

== Gameplay ==
Lone Wolf books rely on a combination of thought and luck. Certain statistics such as combat skill and endurance attributes are determined randomly before play. The player is then allowed to choose which Kai disciplines or skills he or she possess. This number depends directly on how many books in the series have been completed ("Kai rank"). With each additional book completed, the player chooses one additional Kai discipline. Since this is the fourth book in the series, players who have completed all three of the previous books will now be at the rank of "Warmarn" or "Journeyman". This potentially gives access to 8 out of the 10 total Kai disciplines.

== Plot ==
In this book, Lone Wolf is charged by the King of Sommerlund to investigate the disappearance of a troop of cavalry. The cavalry, led by a man named Captain D'Val, themselves disappeared under mysterious circumstances while investigating a disruption in the flow of mined resources from the province of Ruanon. Lone Wolf, along with the fifty Sommlending soldiers who accompany him, must uncover the truth surrounding the missing men and stop the resurrection of an ancient and terrible evil.

== Reception ==
Colin Greenland reviewed The Chasm of Doom for Imagine magazine, and stated that "You can start here, but you'd be much better off going back to the first two and equipping yourself with the almighty Sommerswerd, a heavy duty blade if ever there was one."
