= My Brute =

2009 video game

My Brute is a fighting simulation video game with roleplaying elements first released in March 2009. Though an English-language game, it was developed by Motion Twin, a French online game provider. My Brute originated as a free browser-based Flash game. It was later ported to the iPhone and iPod Touch, with enhanced graphics and added features, by the video game developer Bulkypix.

== Gameplay ==
=== Character creation ===
The player begins by creating an avatar called a Brute. Players may create as many Brutes as they wish. The Brutes of new users are, by default, public and can be used by anyone to battle. However, a password can be added in the Brute's cell page so that only the person who created the Brute can use it.

Players may customize their Brute by giving it a name and adjusting variables such as gender, clothing, hairstyle, accessories, and skin color. The Brute is then randomly assigned ability points (health, strength, agility, and speed), skills, weapons, and pets. There are 26 weapons in the game, 28 skills to learn, and 3 pets: dogs, wolves, and bears.

=== Battle arena and leveling ===
Players gain experience points from fighting in the arena and expand their dojos by recruiting other players as pupils. Each time a player levels up, one of the Brute's three statistics (strength, agility, and speed) is increased. There is also a chance that the Brute will gain a new weapon, a new skill, or a new pet.

The arena fights are completely automatic and require no input from the user. Brutes with higher levels and skills tend to be more successful. Though players cannot control their Brutes in a fight, players can control who their Brutes challenge.

Other than fights that result when a pupil is recruited, a Brute is limited to three or five (depending on the version of the game) fights per day. Six fights are allowed on the day the character is created. However, as players are allowed to create as many Brutes as they wish, players may continue to engage in fights using other Brute characters.

== Reviews ==
Reviewers praised the game's sound effects, cute presentation, and cartoonish graphics. Reviewers found the game simple and easy to get into and appreciated that it required little time investment from the player. Reviewers also found that the game mechanic of pupil-recruitment contributed to the game by making it a social experience. Negative criticism focused on the inability to control the Brutes during the fights, which served to limit the game's depth and replayability. Reviewers also criticized the cap on the number of fights each Brute could engage in daily.
