= Mush (video game) =

2013 browser-based video game

MUSH
- Developer: Motion Twin
- Release: French: 14 January 2013; English: 5 November 2013
- Genres: Simulation, RPG
- Mode: Multiplayer

Mush was a browser-based free-to-play multiplayer game by the French company Motion Twin. The game was first available in French on 14 January 2013. From August 2013, the English version of the game was in closed beta phase, which ended before 5 November 2013 when the game went live.

The plot of the game, wherein an alien entity (the titular "Mush") takes over some of the 16 people on a spaceship and the players attempt to uncover their identities, has been compared to John Carpenter's 1982 film The Thing.

As of 24 November 2023, the publisher's website reported that the game was no longer available. An open-source remake named eMush was released after closure by the community-run non-profit association Eternaltwin.

== Plot and Gameplay ==
Players choose from a roster of characters, each with specified roles and skills (such as captain, pilot, scientist, or detective), and must work together with fifteen other players to complete various tasks on the spacecraft Daedalus. Two of these players are secretly infected with the "Mush", a malevolent alien parasite. The goal of the Mush players is to covertly conquer and infect the rest of the ship, or slay every living human. Human players must find and eliminate the Mush, then pilot the ship either to their homeworld Sol, or to the utopian colony of Eden.

Each player is allotted a set number of action points and movement points which are recharged every "cycle" (three hours of real time). Players also have health and morale points, which they must maintain at risk of death.

The game's graphics utilize pixel art and isometric projection.

== Reception ==
Mush was awarded the Originality Award at 2013’s European Indie Game Days.
