= Battlebikes =

Combat board game

Battlebikes is a supplement published by Games Workshop in 1984 for the near-future post-apocalyptic combat board game Battlecars.

== Gameplay ==
Battlebikes adds combat motorcycles to the game. The components include

- cards and counters for six motorcycles
- weapon counters
- a rulebook

In addition to new rules about combat motorcycles, the rulebook includes two scenarios. In one scenario, "Raid on Taccoville", seven townspeople try to stop three bikers from robbing a bank. In the second scenario, "Smokey Joe's Cafe", four bikers take on two combat cars.

== Publication history ==
Battlebikes, the first expansion for Battlecars, was designed by Gary Chalk, Albie Fiore and Ian Livingstone.

== Reception ==
Chris Baylis reviewed Battlebikes for Imagine magazine, and stated that "I am sorry to report that this boxed set has very little to offer either as an expansion kit to Battlecars, or as a game in its own right (using the Battlecars playing boards of course)."

In the August 1984 edition of White Dwarf (Issue #56), Ian Waddelow thought that "the introduction of armoured motorcycles is a welcome addition" to Battlecars, but wondered why no new weapons had been developed. He admired the two scenarios, calling them "the nicest feature of this supplement, and I hope there'll be more printed in the future." He concluded by giving the supplement an average overall rating of 7 out of 10, saying, "If you liked Battlecars then Battlebikes is a winner, though a few new weapons would have been nice."
