= Penumbear =

2013 video game

- Developer: Taco Graveyard
- Publisher: Bulkypix
- Platform: iOS
- Release: February 28, 2013
- Genre: Puzzle-platform

Penumbear is a puzzle-platform game for iOS developed by Taco Graveyard and published by Bulkypix on February 28, 2013.

== Reception ==
The game has a Metacritic rating of 85% based on 10 critic reviews.

SlideToPlay wrote "Penumbear is a phenomenal combination of platformer, puzzles and story. For those gamers looking for a seriously tough but fun time, you can’t do much better than this. " AppSpy said "Penumbear takes the simple idea of 'walking on light' and runs wild with it, turning a solid platformer in to an absolute gem thanks to its beautiful atmosphere, brain-scratching puzzles, and dastardly challenges for those who need to go the extra mile." TouchArcade commented "The world of Penumbear might not be one you'd want to explore on your own, dark as it is. Navigating a friendly little bear through, on the other hand? Well, that works quite well." Gamezebo wrote "Penumbear is a great example of how platforming controls can be done right on iOS - and it's a lovely little puzzler to boot."

AppSmile said "Featuring levels in the triple digits, creative puzzles, and a great light-darkness mechanic that dictates where you can and cannot go, Penumbear makes for a compelling offering." Pocket Gamer UK wrote "Cute but incredibly difficult, Penumbear oozes brooding malice and will cause a great deal of frustration - but the unique gameplay is tight and appealing enough to keep you enthralled." TouchGen said "Penumbear is a quality puzzle platformer with a lot of content, and unsettling presentation. It never feels casual, and finding all the hidden stuff means you have to be prepared to have Penumbear impaled on spikes quite a lot. Not a game for the kiddies, but rather a game for those into darker games such as Limbo, Nihilumbra or Oscura."
