= Hysteria Project =

2009 video game

- Developer: BulkyPix
- Publishers: BulkyPix; Sanuk Games (PlayStation)
- Platforms: iOS, PlayStation 3/PlayStation Portable
- Release: iOS: WW: April 7, 2009; PlayStation 3, PlayStation Portable: EU: April 15, 2010; NA: April 22, 2010
- Genres: Adventure, FMV
- Mode: Single-player

Hysteria Project is a 2009 FMV adventure game developed and published by French studio BulkyPix for iOS and first released on the App Store on April 7, 2009. It was released as a PlayStation mini available for play on the PlayStation 3 and PlayStation Portable on April 15, 2010 in Europe and April 22, 2010 in North America. The port was published by Sanuk Games. A sequel was released on the App Store in 2011, Hysteria Project 2.

== Gameplay ==
The game is played from a first-person perspective and composed entirely of full motion video scenes as the unnamed protagonist attempts to flee a man wielding an axe. Gameplay involves the player either making choices as regards what action to take at a given moment, or tapping on the touchscreen during context sensitive moments.

An example of the player being offered a choice of options as to what to do next.

When the player is presented with a choice, the game cuts to a decision tree, where the player selects their choice. The game then moves on to the next segment, and the player can see if they selected the correct choice. Choices involve, for example, choosing to take the left or right path, or choosing to remain hidden or run away. However, the game script is fixed, different choices do not lead to a branching narrative - if the player makes the wrong choice (choosing to remain hidden instead of fleeing, for example), the player will die and the game will end, with a text description of how the player has died. At this point, the game can jump back anywhere between one and three choices.

The other style of gameplay consists of tapping on the touchscreen to perform different actions, such as sneaking through a forest without bumping against branches or navigating a series of tripwires. If the player fails to tap the screen in the correct place at the correct moment, they will die.

== Plot ==
The game begins with an unidentified man awakening in a shed, where he has been tied up for reasons unknown. After managing to free himself, he begins to run through the woods surrounding the shed. However, he soon finds himself being chased by a hooded man wielding an axe, the same man who had placed him in the shed originally.

As he flees, the player finds a mysterious, and recent, tattoo of a letter H on his arm, the same letter was also inscribed on the inside of the shed door. The player continues to run, until he seems to faint. He awakens to find himself being dragged back to the shed. Groggy and confused, he once again escapes from the shed and runs through the woods, only to once again find himself being chased by the hooded man. At one point, what appears to a creature made of black smoke darts across his path. As he flees, he finds a small land mine, which he throws into the path of the hooded man. There is an explosion, and the hooded man disappears. The player then races from the forest into a nearby building, disappearing up a flight of stairs. However, after he has entered the stairwell, the door closes behind him, and is seen to be inscribed with the same H as the tattoo and the shed.

Upon completing the game, the player is given access to a "secret file" which reveals some of the backstory. The file is in the form of a series of police reports from the desk of Sgt. Coyle. The reports detail how an eminent scientist, Professor Gustavo Ortega, has gone missing whilst sailing on his yacht. Evidence seemed to suggest a pirate raid, but no ransom demand was ever issued. Ortega was a world expert in artificial intelligence and nanotechnology and was head of a mysterious research project known only as "Project H", which seemed to have unlimited funding from the board of directors of Ortega's firm, NanoPharma. The only person he allowed work with him on the project was Professor Lisa Spencer, who was killed in a mysterious car accident several days after the disappearance of Ortega. However, her body was so badly burned that she could only be identified by some objects of jewellery she was wearing. The reports also reveal that following the explosion in the woods, several reports were made to police by people who had heard the noise and seen the strange black smoke. Coyle went to investigate the area and discovered the body of a man with a H tattooed on his arm who had died of a heart attack. A post-mortem revealed that some time prior to his death, the man had been tied up. In his pocket was a photograph of Ortega and Spencer, whom Coyle is convinced are still alive, with the incident in the woods connected to Project H. An extract from Ortega's journal also reveals that injecting newly developed nanomachines into a mouse resulted in enhanced senses, but led to the mouse becoming uncontrollably aggressive, and eventually dying of a heart attack.

== Reception ==
Reception

Aggregate scores
| Aggregator | Score |
|---|---|
| GameRankings | 57.40% (iOS); 56.67% (PSP) |
| Metacritic | 64/100 |

Review scores
| Publication | Score |
|---|---|
| IGN | 7.2/10 (iOS); 7/10 (PSP) |
| 148 Apps | 3.5/5 |
| Pocket Gamer | 5/10 |
| PSP Minis | 6/10 |
| Slide to Play | 1/4 |
| TouchGen | 3.5/5 |

Award
| Publication | Award |
|---|---|
| Milthon 2009 | Revelation 2009 |

Upon its release, Hysteria Project received mixed reviews. The PSP version of the game holds an aggregate score of 68 out of 100 on Metacritic, based on four reviews. On GameRankings, the iOS version holds a score of 57.40%, based on five reviews, and the PSP version holds a score of 56.67%, based on three reviews.

Chris Hall of 148Apps was impressed, scoring the game 3.5 out of 5. He praised how the game was shot, comparing it to The Blair Witch Project, but felt the gameplay was repetitive and the game itself too short; "Hysteria is a short, sweet adventure that only costs $1.99. If you are at all a fan of the old cinematic video game genre or just like horror games in general, pick this one up." TouchGen's Nigel Wood also scored the game 3.5 out of 5, praising the tone of the game, but criticizing the length; "If you want a quick fright then this game delivers, but if you were hoping for a deep interactive experience then this first part of Hysteria only scratches the surface."

IGN's Levi Buchanan scored the iOS version 7.2 out of 10 and the PSP version 7 out of 10. He compared the game to old Sega CD FMV games, such as Night Trap and was somewhat critical of the video compression. He also felt the game was too linear, but concluded that although "the narrative loses steam about halfway through the game (some of the choices get repetitive), Hysteria Project is still an intriguing exercise in storytelling on a new platform."

Pocket Gamer's Tracy Erickson was unimpressed, scoring the game 5 out of 10. He was critical of the linearity of the narrative and the "black & white" nature of the choices; "These opaque choices give Hysteria Project an arbitrary feel, which is compounded by its lack of believability and narrative development. The killer apparently can't move faster than a snail's pace and never notices when you hide behind a stump or mossy rock in clear sight." They concluded "nothing more than a collection of video clips and meaningless ultimatums, Hysteria Project offers little in the way of gameplay and compelling adventure."

Slide to Play's Andrew Podolsky was even less impressed, scoring the game 1 out of 4, and writing "With nameless, faceless characters, an uninteresting environment, poor video-based gameplay and a clichéd concept, there's not much to recommend about Hysteria Project."

PSPMinis scored the PSP version 6 out of 10. They praised the atmosphere, but found the gameplay to be repetitive in the second half of the game. They concluded "Even though it's very short (perhaps half an hour at most) and has little replay value, it's possibly worth a buy due to the low price and novelty, and because it does give you a few moments (maybe ten minutes) of genuine uneasiness. Just know what you are getting into."
