= Die2Nite =

2008 video game

- Developer(s): Motion Twin
- Publisher(s): Motion Twin
- Platform(s): browser-based
- Release: 15 July 2008
- Genre(s): Survival game

Die2Nite was a browser-based, multiplayer survival game created by Motion Twin. Gameplay took place in real-time, with the objective being to build a town that could survive as long as possible against assaults from hordes of zombies at 23:00 server time, with the hordes growing exponentially each day. Due to Adobe Flash's support ending, the game was shut down in 2023, although Motion Twin made the game's assets public in order to facilitate the creation of fan made versions of the game.

== Gameplay ==
=== Overview ===
Each town consists of 40 players. The main goal is for the town, and the individuals, to survive for as long as possible.

Each day, between 23:00 and 23:15, zombies attack the town. If the number of zombies exceeds the town's defense rating, any additional zombies enter the town, where they randomly attack citizens and terrorize or kill them. If the town's gate is not closed by 23:00, then the town's defenses are useless, and every zombie attacks the town. The number of zombies exponentially increases after each day, making the destruction of each town an inevitability.

Defenses must be constructed with resources scavenged from outside the town. However, players are not forced to do this, so a town's success depends heavily on each player's experience and willingness to cooperate.

Each character begins the day with 6 Action Points, which can be spent on moving around in the world beyond or constructing defenses. Action points are replenished by consuming items such as food, water, alcohol and drugs. Besides food and water, all other consumed items have potential negative side effects. While characters cannot die from hunger, they can die from dehydration and have to drink at least once every two days.

Characters can suffer (or benefit) from a wide range of status effects, after consuming items or fighting zombies. Many of these effects are either detrimental to the citizens' performance or lead to their deaths.

By default, players were given the role of "residents." Players could choose to take on more advanced roles, called Heroes, by paying a subscription fee.

The main channel of communicating between players is a town-specific forum. There, players can set goals, make announcements and debate about the town's development. Every player's action is recorded in a log accessed by all townspeople. If a member's actions are deemed disruptive or non-constructive, others can shun them out of the community, cutting their access to the town's various activities and opening the possibility for their character to be executed.

Each player, instead of having a physical identity, is represented by a "soul" which is re-incarnated throughout their various "lives". This allows a player to enter a new town whenever their character dies.

== Development ==
After a beta-test period, the original French version, Hordes, was officially released on 15 July 2008. From 1 to 3 December 2008, the game experienced major server problems, which was later referred to as "Armageddon," as all towns were destroyed. However, it was later revealed that Armageddon was actually a planned event, intended to bring major content updates to the game. The first version of Die2Nite, the official English version of the game, was released on 1 December 2010. An official Spanish version, titled Zombinoia, was also been released.

On 2 November 2023, Die2Nite was shut down, as were Motion Twin's other web games. However, Motion Twin provided public access to the game's assets in order to support fan recreations, and a fan group called the Eternaltwin project has developed a remake called MyHordes.

== Reception ==
Hordes received a score of 16/20 on the French video game website Jeuxvideo and 13/20 on Gameart.eu. Quintin Smith gave a mostly positive review of the English Beta version on Rock, Paper, Shotgun, remarking that the "size of the playerbase is perfect" while noting that the fact that the town's gates can only be opened from the inside leaves "potential for passive-aggression".
