= Pix'n Love Rush =

2010 video game

- Developers: Pasta Games (iOS); Bulkypix (PSP); Advanced Mobile Applications (Ouya)
- Publishers: Bulkypix (iOS); Sanuk Games (PSP); Advanced Mobile Applications (Ouya)
- Platforms: iOS, PlayStation Portable, Ouya
- Release: iPhone; June 16, 2010; Pix'n Love Rush DX; December 16, 2010; PSP; NA: March 15, 2011; EU: March 26, 2011; Ouya; April 30, 2013
- Genre: Platformer

Pix'n Love Rush is a platform game released for iOS, PlayStation Portable, and Ouya in 2010-2013. An updated version called Pix'n Love Rush DX was released only for iOS on December 16, 2010.

== Reception ==
Reception

Aggregate score
Aggregator	Score	
Aggregator	iOS	PSP
Metacritic	86/100	76/100

Review scores
Publication	Score	
Publication	iOS	PSP
The A.V. Club	A	N/A
Edge	7/10	N/A
GamePro	4.5/5	N/A
GamesMaster	75%	81%
Gamezebo	4/5	N/A
GameZone	7/10	N/A
IGN	8.9/10 (DX) 7.5/10	N/A
PlayStation Official Magazine – UK	N/A	5/10
Pocket Gamer	3.5/5	N/A
TouchArcade	4.5/5	N/A

The iOS and PSP versions received "generally favorable reviews" according to the review aggregation website Metacritic.

Slide To Play said of the iOS version, "Pix'n Love Rush is a surprisingly epic, retro-styled gem." The A.V. Club wrote, "Regardless of what it looks like, Pix'n is deep enough to drain hours on the couch, but also casual enough to distract throughout an entire commute." AppSpy said, "Pix'n Love Rush is the perfect example of how classic gaming can be paired with modern casual gaming, creating a challenging and addictive title that's almost endlessly appealing." TouchArcade wrote that the same iOS version "Comes together beautifully to create a game that's perfectly suited for long or short play sessions, and beckons to be played over and over as you work towards high score glory."

148Apps.com said, "The game is visually a treat when it isn't distracting and its individually separated level segments differentiate it from other endless platformers." GamePro wrote, "A scoring system that completely alters the visual style of the game adds to the unique flavor of Pix'n Love Rush, and the fast gameplay makes it a perfect 'pick-up-and-play' sort of game." IGN wrote of the iPhone original, "The rapid-fire stage shifts, the straightforward but challenging gameplay, and the ease at which you can bounce in and out of Pix'n Love Rush all contribute to this stellar score." GamesMaster said of the iOS version, "It's repetitive, but that too is true to the game's old school inspiration." Pocket Gamer wrote, "Part Mario, part Space Invaders, part every 2D game you can think of, Pix'n Love Rush's complex set-up will likely charm just as many players as it bamboozles." GameZone wrote, "For a buck, this is a quality purchase. The five-minute mode is intense, fast and hard, and players will come back to it time and time again. That said, their stay in the game won't last very long. It really is a five-minute run, maybe once or twice a day." Edge described the same iOS version as "A short, budget shot of old-school gaming."
