= Flight from the Dark =

Book by Joe Dever

- American cover, original release
- Author: Joe Dever
- Illustrator: Gary Chalk
- Cover artist: Gary Chalk (UK); Brian Salmon (UK); Peter Andrew Jones (UK); Don Maitz (USA)
- Language: English
- Series: Lone Wolf
- Genre: Fantasy
- Publisher: Sparrow Books (UK); Beaver Books (UK); Red Fox (UK); Berkley / Pacer (USA)
- Publication date: 1984
- Publication place: United Kingdom
- Media type: Print (Paperback)
- ISBN: 0-09-935890-5
- OCLC: 11471437
- Followed by: Fire on the Water

Flight from the Dark is the first installment in the award-winning Lone Wolf book series created by Joe Dever.

== Gameplay ==
The reader is allowed to choose five Kai Disciplines from a list of ten, and is given meagre equipment. Because the reader has no equipment from previous books, some disciplines, most notably Weapon Skill, may not be useful at the start of the adventure. This makes initial discipline choices and careful movement through the book more important than in some later books. It is however possible to get through the adventure with little to no combat, allowing an astute reader to succeed even with weak Combat Skill and Endurance.

== Reception ==
Marcus L. Rowland reviewed both Flight from the Dark and Fire on the Water together for White Dwarf #60, giving it an overall rating of 7 out of 10, and stated that "Both books are fair, emphasizing combat rather than traps and tricks. Those traps which are used can be anticipated, and usually by-passed or defused by use of Lone Wolf's skills."

According to sales figures, this first book sold over 100,000 copies in its first month of publication alone. The 2007 extended version (Mongoose Publishing) saw a thorough re-working of the story and has been critically praised.

== Re-release ==
Mongoose Publishing republished the book in 2007, featuring new internal artwork by Richard Longmore, and an extended version of the story, extensively rewritten by Joe Dever. Among the changes made, the start of the adventure is different from the original version. Instead of being knocked out by a branch, Silent Wolf is present at the Monastery at the time of the attack of the Darklords. He fights his way to the top of Tower of the Sun to activate a beacon that will alert all of Sommerlund of the attack.

The re-release was shortlisted for the 2008 Origins Fiction Award (Academy of Adventure Gaming Arts & Design).
