= Curse of the Mummy's Tomb (board game) =

Board game

- Cover art illustrated by James Warhola
- Designers: Stephen Hand
- Illustrators: Gary Chalk, Dave Andrews, H
- Publishers: Games Workshop
- Players: 1-4
- Setup time: 5-10 minutes
- Playing time: Approximately 2 hours
- Chance: Medium to High (Solo play)
- Age range: 14 to Adult
- Skills: Simple mathematics

Curse of the Mummy's Tomb is a pulp fiction board game published by Games Workshop in 1988. It features a three-dimensional board, representing an Egyptian pyramid, with two consecutively smaller playing areas above the bottom board. The aim of the game is to reach the top of the Pyramid of Khonsu, complete the tasks within and obtain the Elixir of Life. In addition to traps, creatures and treasures, there can be encounters with the deadly Mummy itself.

== Description ==
Curse of the Mummy's Tomb is a game for 1–4 players, each of which controls an adventurer seeking to reach the Chamber of Osiris at the top of the Pyramid Of Khonsu.

=== Characters ===
Each of the four characters included in the game has seven different attributes: Cunning, Dexterity, Egyptology, Fortune, Speed, Strength, and Will. In addition, each character has 4 lives, which can be removed by encounters with Hazards, Creatures or the Mummy. A player who loses all four lives is out of the game.

The four characters included with the game are:

- Marlow Hammett - Hard-boiled private eye
- Rev Luther Kirkegard - Religious cleric
- Professor Nayland Cushing - Explorer
- Lieutenant-General The Earl of Carmarthen - Soldier

Each of these is represented by a 25 mm metal miniature taken from the "Gothic Horror" line of miniatures by Citadel Miniatures; the Mummy miniature is taken from Citadel's "Night Horrors" line. All five were designed by Trish and Aly Morrison.

=== Components ===
The game box includes:

- 5 metal miniatures (the four characters and the Mummy)
- 4 playsheets
- 32 attribute markers
- 55 Tana Leaf markers of various denominations
- Snap together Pyramid of Khonsu
- 114 playing cards
- 12-sided die

=== Setup ===
In games with more than one player, each player initially draws five cards from a universal deck and six points of Tana Leaf counters. The deck contains a variety of movement cards, Monsters, Hazards and Discoveries. The players then roll a 12-sided die to determine who starts the game.

=== The Mummy ===
Each turn starts by moving the Mummy. The Mummy starts in one of four fixed locations on the bottom board. Players secretly bid any number of Tana Leaves that they possess, and the winner is able to move the Mummy one space. In the event of a tie, the Mummy is not moved. If the Mummy enters a space containing a character's piece, the player controlling the Mummy chooses whether to inflict damage to the character or steal a Discovery. After this, the Mummy returns to one of its starting locations.

=== Players' turn ===
On each player's turn, they have one of three choices: Pass, Heal or Move.

- Passing allows the player to discard any number of cards in their hand for the listed number of Tana Leaves on the discarded cards. The player then redraws to bring their hand back to five cards.
- Healing swaps ten Tana Leaves for regaining one Life, up to a maximum of three Lives.
- Movement allows the character to play a movement card from their hand, then move their character in one of the permitted compass directions, or ascend/descend a board level according to the movement card. The character cannot move into a space containing another character. Each other player can then play a movement card and move the active player's character one space, possibly to the character's detriment.

==== Encounters ====
After Movement, the player then explores his current location. Some board spaces have numbers printed on them, indicating the number of encounters faced. Each player can then play a Hazard, a Creature or Discovery card from their hand, until the number of encounters is reached, or the player has used one card of each type, whichever is lower.

- Hazards represent traps or other devices intended to protect the pyramid from intruders. These usually require testing a character's ability score by rolling the die equal to or lower than the character's attribute. Rolling over that number means the trap is sprung, causing the character to lose a life.
- Creatures are the pyramid's guardians or other (hostile) treasure hunters. The player can Attack, Trick or Retreat by rolling the die, adding the character's appropriate attribute score, then comparing it to the creature's relevant attribute plus a die roll. A successful Attack defeats the creature, while a Retreat moves the character back a number of squares. If Trickery just beats the opponent, the opponent is discarded; beating the creature by a large margin turns it into a single-use bodyguard against other creatures.
- Discoveries range from items that add to the character's attributes to ways of defeating Hazards and Creatures.

After the player's action, each player then redraws cards to return their hand to five if necessary, then play passes clockwise. Once all players have had a turn, play returns to the first step with the Mummy being moved.

=== Victory conditions ===
To win, a player has to obtain the Elixir of Life by entering the Chamber of Osiris, which is only accessible from specific locations on the top tiered board, and only if the character has found the special Key of Osiris. Once inside the chamber, the character must successfully test three character specific attributes to win the game. If the character fails on the first attempt, the character remains in the chamber and can try again on the next turn. Several characters can be in the chamber trying to get the Elixir at the same time, but have no way to hinder or interrupt other players.

=== Solo rules ===
The game can be played solitaire. The Mummy's movement is controlled by die rolls, and the playing deck is separated into Movement and Hazard/Creature/Discovery cards, but otherwise, the victory and loss conditions remain the same.

== Publication history ==
Games Workshop published a number of traditional board games in the 1980s. The last of these was The Curse of the Mummy's Tomb, designed by Stephen Hand, with interior art by Dave Andrews and Gary Chalk, cover art by James Warhola, and metal miniatures designed by Trish and Aly Morrison. It was published in 1988, just as the company turned away from role-playing games and board games to concentrate on Warhammer 40K products.

Four additional characters and their attributes appeared in Issue 102 of White Dwarf. These characters and four new Citadel miniatures for them were released in the game expansion Curse of the Mummy's Tomb: In Search of Eternity in 1988.

== Reception ==
In Issue 10 of The Games Machine, Robin Hogg enjoyed Curse of the Mummy's Tomb, calling it "an entertaining game with plenty of possible events." However, he found the climax of the game a let-down, since a character can sit in the Chamber of Osiris and roll dice until they succeed in winning with no chance for other players to intervene. He also found the games "can continue for ages with no one making any real progress," if three of the four players all use trap and movement cards to hinder the fourth player who is close to winning. Hogg concluded on an ambivalent note, saying, "Overall, an attractive and fun game, though I'm not sure about its long-term appeal. Once you've seen one Chamber of Osiris you've seen 'em all!"

Matt Thrower, writing for There Will Be Games, called Curse of the Mummy's Tomb "lackluster", a game that "proved to be the dawn of a new wave of classic [Games Workshop] hobby titles with a focus on figures over cardboard."

Chris Pennsauken, writing for Board Game Beast, was disappointed in the flimsy pyramid, noting, "Coming from Games Workshop I expected better craftsmanship." He found the game "didn't offer up anything interesting," commenting that it was "An attempt by Games Workshop to prove they are more than just a miniature games company. Which sadly they are." He concluded by rating it 3.5 out of 5, saying, "Curse of the Mummy’s Tomb has plenty of re-playability, but it just lacks something creative [...] The game can move from slow to exciting in a shot and most times just drags on and never ever ends."
