= Autumn Dynasty =

2012 video game

- Developer(s): Touch Dimensions
- Publisher(s): BulkyPix
- Platform(s): iOS, Android, BlackBerry
- Release: May 24, 2012
- Genre(s): Real-time strategy
- Mode(s): Single-player

Autumn Dynasty is a 2012 real-time strategy game developed by the Singaporean studio Touch Dimensions and published by BulkyPix.

== Gameplay ==
There are three options to choose from in the game; Campaign, Skirmish, and Blitz. Campaign covers the story of the game, Skirmish allows the player to battle other players, and Blitz starts the player with all abilities unlocked from the start.

== Reception ==
On the review aggregator website Metacritic, Autumn Dynasty has a "generally favorable" score of 85 based on 12 critics.
