= Motion Twin =

French video game developer

- Type: Private
- Industry: Video games
- Founded: 2001; 25 years ago
- Headquarters: Bordeaux, France
- Products: Dead Cells, Die2Nite, Castlevania: Belmont's Curse
- Number of employees: 8
- Website: motiontwin.com

Motion Twin is a French independent video game developer based in Bordeaux. Best known for developing the critically acclaimed Dead Cells, it initially specialized in online video games and has most recently worked on roguelike games. The company is a worker cooperative enterprise.

== History ==
Motion Twin was founded in 2001 as a private limited company in France. In 2004, it became a worker cooperative with equal salary and decision-making power between its members. The name Motion Twin refers to an animation technique, called motion tween, and the choice of a red star in the logo is because of its revolutionary significance.

In the studio's early years, it made web-based games for its social gaming platform Twinoid. Motion Twin initially gained notice through the release of games such as Hammerfest, My Brute, Mush, Die2Nite, and AlphaBounce. By 2009, Motion Twin had 10 million registered users and 15 games.

As the market for web games dried up, it attempted to move into mobile games, with little success. By this point, Motion Twin had briefly considered disbanding.

Left with one "last chance" for the studio, Motion Twin developed Dead Cells. It was made as the developers' "passion project" and "something hardcore, ultra-niche, with pixel art and ridiculous difficulty" that they thought would be a potential risk for gaining player interest. Motion Twin initially attempted to make a follow-up to tower defense game Die2Nite, but most of the game mechanics were ultimately stripped out to focus on action-based combat.

Dead Cells was released to Steam Early Access in May 2017 and macOS and Linux on June 26, 2018. It was released on Windows, Xbox One, PlayStation 4, and Nintendo Switch August 7. An iOS version was released on August 28, 2019, and an Android version was released on June 3, 2020.

About a year from its early access release, Dead Cells sold over 730,000 units, and exceeded 850,000 units just prior to its full release. By May 2019, within ten months of its full release, Dead Cells had accumulated sales of two million units. In March 2021, Dead Cells had sold 5 million copies. It reached 10 million copies sold in 2023.

In 2019, Motion Twin assisted in the establishment of Evil Empire to take over development and support of Dead Cells, allowing other Motion Twin developers to start on their next project. Evil Empire is run by Steve Filby, Motion Twin's former head of marketing, and is not a cooperative, since the company wanted to scale beyond ten employees. Motion Twin continues to maintain creative control over Evil Empire's work on Dead Cells.

The game's first paid expansion, Dead Cells: The Bad Seed, was released on February 11, 2020. A second paid DLC expansion, Dead Cells: Fatal Falls, was released on January 26, 2021. The game's third paid expansion titled Dead Cells: The Queen and the Sea was released on January 7, 2022. A fourth paid expansion, Dead Cells: Return to Castlevania, was released on March 6, 2023. There have also been over 30 free updates since the game's initial release.

On December 7, 2023, Motion Twin announced its next game, Windblown, debuting a trailer at The Game Awards 2023. The game is characterized as a fast-paced isometric action game.

On February 9, 2024, Motion Twin announced it would stop creating new content for Dead Cells, and Evil Empire would be moving on to new projects. In April 2024, it was revealed that Evil Empire's next game was The Rogue Prince of Persia. It released into Early Access in May and fully released in december.

In February 2026 Motion Twin announced that Evil Empire had been developing Castlevania: Belmont's Curse an entry in the Castlevania franchise, of which they had previously developer the Crossover downloadable content for Dead cells. The game released on October 15th of the same year, to positive reviews.

== Games ==
- Poulpi (2001)
- Frutiparc (2004)
- Dinoparc (2005)
- Socratomancie (2005)
- Hammerfest (2006)
- Pioupiouz (2006)
- Miniville (2007)
- AlphaBounce (2007)
- CafeJeux (2007)
- DinoRPG (2007)
- Hordes / Die2Nite (2008)
- SkyWar (2009)
- Intrusion (2009)
- Kingdom (2009)
- My Brute (2009)
- Fever (2010)
- Kube (2010)
- Snake (2010)
- Naturalchimie 2 (2010)
- CroqueMotel (2011)
- Odyssey (2011)
- La Bourinette (2011)
- Mush (2012)
- Galaxy55 (2012)
- Teacher Story (2013)
- Uppercup Football (2014)
- Rockfaller Journey (2015)
- Monster Hotel (2015)
- Dead Cells (2018)
- The Rogue Prince of Persia (2025)
- Castlevania: Belmont's Curse (2026)
- Windblown (TBA)

Following the success of Dead Cells, Motion Twin abandoned its web-based offerings. With the end of Adobe Flash Player support on January 1, 2021, those games would be rendered unplayable. In order to keep the games online, a group of hobbyist set up Eternal-Twin (with Motion Twin's consent), which aims to re-create as many games as possible without using Adobe Flash Player. Thus, those who still want to play after Flash Player's end of life will be able to do so. Motion Twin has also made the source code for many of its game available to the public under a creative commons license.

== Studios founded by former employees ==
- Nicolas Cannasse co-founded Shiro Games in 2012.
- Sébastien Benard founded Deepnight Games in 2020. (see Nuclear Blaze)
- Benjamin Soulé co-founded PUNKCAKE Délicieux in 2021. (see Shotgun King: The Final Checkmate)

== Software products ==
Nicolas Cannasse, a former developer at Motion Twin, has been responsible for the creation of freeware and open source compilers and multimedia technologies, many of which build on the Adobe Flash platform.

His published products include:

- MTASC - fast ActionScript 2 compiler
- Haxe - multi-platform language similar to ActionScript 3
- NekoVM - VM-based runtime and language

=== Programming and development ===
The company, although known to the public for its browser games in flash, is at the origin of various tools and programming languages which it uses for its own developments, and which it makes available under a free license. Under the impetus of one of its co-founders, Nicolas Canasse, the Bordeaux company is, for example, at the origin of the MTASC compiler, or Motion Twin ActionScript 2 Compiler, the first free ActionScript 2.0 compilers.

Haxe, a technology considered to be the successor to the MTASC compiler, also invented and developed by Motion Twin, is a cross-platform language that makes it possible, from a single standardized language, to compile the same source file by targeting different platforms such as JavaScript, Flash, NekoVM, PHP or C++. The language is the subject of the book Professional Haxe and Neko, by Franco Ponticelli and L. McColl-Sylveste, published in 2008 by John Wiley & Sons.

Motion Twin has also developed its own virtual machine, called Neko. Neko is both a high-level, dynamically typed programming language whose source files, once compiled, can be run on the NekoVM virtual machine. The company is also the initiator of various libraries for the OCaml and PHP programming languages, such as the SPOD library, which allows persistence within a PHP environment.
