= James Clavell's Tai-Pan =

1981 board game

Front cover art

James Clavell's Tai-Pan is a board game published by FASA in 1981 that is based on the best-selling 1966 novel Tai-Pan by James Clavell.

== Gameplay ==
Set in the 1830s, Tai Pan is a game of international commerce for 2–4 players. Each player uses a clipper ship to buy opium in India and sell it in China, then uses three local lorchas to buy Chinese goods such as silk and tea. The players race back to England with their cargos; the first clipper ship to arrive is able to sell their goods for the highest price.

== Publication history ==
After the success of the 1980 TV miniseries Shōgun and the 1981 miniseries Noble House, both based on novels by James Clavell, FASA quickly produced four family board games based on Clavell novels: Tai-Pan (1981), designed by Ian Bailey and Albie Fiore; Noble House (1981); Shōgun (1983); and Whirlwind (1986).

== Reception ==
In Issue 140 of Dragon (December 1988), Jim Bambra thought the rules were "simple and elegant, taking into acount [sic?] such things as clipper movement, market fluctuations, and a wide range of events." He recommended it, saying, "Tai-Pan is a fun, family game that makes for a good evening's entertainment."

Rick Heli, on the website Spotlight on Games noted that "Each clipper sailing is a race in which greater profits are realized for coming first, and realized in ways that are very sensible for the theme." Heli noted that there are a large number of cards drawn, and that "some may complain that there is too much luck in the 'take that' cards". But overall, he felt that this game is "Definitely the best entry in the James Clavell series."

== Reviews ==
- Best Games of 1988 in Games #94
