= Alternative Armies =

Alternative Armies is a miniature gaming and modeling company located in Scotland. It produces a range of different games and model ranges, the most famous of which is the game of Flintloque.

== Games ==
=== Games based in the world of Valon ===
==== Third Age of Valon ====
- Darke Storme – fantasy skirmish game, 28mm scale miniatures

==== Fourth Age of Valon ====
- Flintloque – Napoleonic fantasy skirmish game created by Mac Coxhead and Steve Blease in 1995. Since 2002 in the 2nd and greatly expanded 3rd edition books the authors have been Mike White and Gavin Syme (GBS).
- Slaughterloo – Napoleonic fantasy battle game
- Trafalgore – Napoleonic fantasy naval game
- Dresda - fantasy miniatures wargame

==== Fifth Age of Valon ====
- Frontear – Napoleonic, American Civil War and Wild West fantasy skirmish game

=== Earth-based fantasy games ===
==== Erin ====
Erin is a skirmish wargame based on the Invasion Cycle of Celtic Ireland. Its intent is to portray the feel of accurate Celtic mythology and is played with a range of 28 mm models.

In the game world ancient magic, old gods and monsters from the mists of time are common as well as mere men and women.

Erin allows the players to take the role of a Hero of ancient Myth and to lead the War band that they assemble through Legends of triumph, glory and tragedy. Their Hero and War band may one of five types:

- Milesian – the Milesians are a numerous people with many kingdoms, they fight for territory or for revenge but often their Heroes will undertake a Legend of the sublime kind an 'Epic' or near impossible task.
- Sidhe – the Sidhe are a whimsical race. What seems trivial to a Man they find significant, what Man mocks they cherish. To a Sidhe Hero even the pursuit of a poignant tune can be a lauded quest.
- Fomorian – the Formori are the sea dwellers who come to the land to conquer, with little in the way of lofty ideals, it is for avarice and cruelty that they quest.
- Firbolg – the Fir Bolg are warriors with little notion of Magic and the joys of Legend they shun the finer things and embrace the rage of the primeval. They fight for personal recognition and their wicker shields run with taken life.
- Nemedian – the Nemed; now they run with the forests and creatures of Erin. The great Stags, they sing of freedom and the destruction of the vileness that continues to seek their enslavement. Nemed will fight for justice and a peaceful glade.

The game is currently in its second edition.

==== Typhon ====
Typhon is what Alternative Armies describes as a "Heroic Scale" skirmish game with 50 mm scale miniatures.

It is set in the days of Greek myth and allows players to play the parts of three main types of warrior bands:

- The Hoplites – men who serve the Gods of Olympus.
- The Shades – those who died who now serve Hades.
- The Cyclopeans – creatures with the mind of Men who serve only themselves.

Many of the monsters of Greek myth are also present in the game; currently the included monsters are:

- The Hydra of Lerna
- The Minotaur of Minos
- The Chimera
- The Griffin
- The Cadmus Dragon
- The Harpies
- The Cyclops
- The Medusa
- The Nemean Lion

=== Science-fiction games ===
- Crusader – futuristic skirmish game

== Miniature ranges ==
All the games produced by Alternative Armies are backed up by their own range of models mainly in 28mm scale, except for Typhon which uses 50mm "Heroic Scale" models, which are produced under the Vulcan Models range. They also produce generic fantasy models, terrain features, accessories and a range of 15mm scale models for other gaming formats. Added recently were Grinning Skull Miniatures, a range of mutant pigmen and other creatures sculpted by Will Grundy of the Grinning Skull blog.

== Publications ==
=== The Notables ===
This is a bi-monthly fanzine published by the makers of Flintloque that supports the game and the other systems produced by Alternative Armies. This printed publication in the form of a loose sheaf 18th Century English newspaper contains fiction, scenarios, information, reviews of the latest miniatures and artwork, as well as fan submissions.

Currently all those who ask for a copy of the newspaper get it sent to them free all over the world.
