= Street Fighter (AutoVentures) =

Street Fighter is a 1985 tabletop game supplement published by Task Force Games for Car Wars.

== Contents ==
Street Fighter is a supplement in which an AutoVentures scenario for one player set in a near-future world of vehicular combat, where the player is a cab driver who becomes trapped in a deadly city district. The supplement comes with cardboard miniatures.

== Publication history ==
Street Fighter was written by Aaron Allston and published by Task Force Games in 1985 as a 32-page book with an outer folder.
