= Battlecars =

Battlecars is a simple wargame based upon the Mad Max genre of a post-apocalyptic world dominated by aggressive, warring gangs. It was first published by Games Workshop in 1983 and the game designers were Gary Chalk and Ian Livingstone.

== Gameplay ==
Each player has one or more "battlecars" that are equipped with machine guns, flamethrowers, spike droppers and the like, with much taken from the cinematic James Bond mythology of modified vehicles.

The simple game mechanics allowed for quick and entertaining game play, with damage being marked off using card counters. The game was too simple for some more mature players, given its relatively basic rules and lack of capacity to design unique vehicles. It is possible that the game was intended to capitalise on the popularity at the time of Car Wars game published by Steve Jackson Games. The game was not successful and has been forgotten by the general public. The production values of the game, however, were higher than those of the early versions of Car Wars.

== History ==
One boxed expansion set for this game was released, Battlebikes, introducing motorcycles and also handling some errata.

A licensed Swedish language version of the game was published by Target Games under the name Combat Cars.

In 1984 The Black Sun Magazine published a set of rules by Michael Bradford called Battlechairs. The rules allowed players to field armoured wheelchairs driven by injured Battlecars drivers.

In the autumn of 1984, Games Workshop released Battlecars as a computer game for the ZX Spectrum. It was written by SLUG (a Harlow co-operative of ex-programmers from Red Shift). It was launched alongside two other Games Workshop titles, D-Day and Tower Of Despair.

AutoVentures also released supplements usable for Battlecars, and the company was later purchased by Task Force Games who continued the product line.

Later in the '80s Games Workshop released a new product named Battlecars, however this was for an expansion box of car models for their separate road-based wargame of Dark Future and was not connected to, or compatible with, the original game.

== Reception ==
Chris Baylis reviewed Battlecars for Imagine magazine, and stated that "if you like mentally blowing away the guy who cuts you up on the motorway, then Battlecars will help you gain revenge and relieve the tension, without alerting the local constabulary."

Ian Waddelow reviewed Battlecars for White Dwarf #52, giving it an overall rating of 8 out of 10, and stated that "Battlecars is abstract, yet this is to its advantage. If you want quick, simple and fluid action, take a look at Battlecars."

Craig Sheeley reviewed Battlecars in Space Gamer No. 71. Sheeley commented that "Battlecars is an admirable boardgame, a simple wargame. But compare its limited movement and combat, its scanty number of options in auto selection, and its price to the somewhat more-complex but free movement and combat and bewilderingly large vehicle selection (including design-your-owns) in Car Wars, which retails for less than one-third the money. It's not likely that Battlecars is going to oust Car Wars for the number one position. However, if what you want is a simple, elegant game of auto-combat with a high price tag, then you might consider Battlecars. I'll stay with Car Wars."

== Reviews ==
- Casus Belli #18 (Dec 1983)
- Asimov's Science Fiction v8 n10 (1984 10)
- 1984 Games 100

== See also ==
- Dark Future, a subsequent miniature-based car battle game by Games Workshop
- Freeway Fighter, a gamebook by Ian Livingstone with a similar setting
- Battlecars (video game)
