= Gary Chalk =

British artist illustrator

Gary Chalk (born 1952) is an English illustrator and model-maker.

== Career ==
A native of rural Hertfordshire, Chalk began playing wargames at the age of fifteen. He took a BA degree in design and worked as a teacher of art and design before going freelance.

Chalk is perhaps best known for his contributions to the Lone Wolf series of gamebooks written by Joe Dever. In addition to Lone Wolf, Chalk has been involved in the artwork for a number of other notable games and books including the board game Talisman, and the first six volumes of the Redwall series of children's books. He has drawn maps for the entire selection of Warriors books by Erin Hunter.

Chalk and Ian Bailey created the game Fantasy Warlord (1990) to attempt to compete with Games Workshop's Warhammer Fantasy Battle. In 2009–2010, Chalk illustrated Sundered Lands, Allan Frewin Jones' books. Chalk is also illustrating with original artworks the French edition of Mongoose Publishing's Lone Wolf RPG. Chalk was one of the illustrators of The Secret History of Giants (2008), by Ari Berk.

== Other games ==
- Advanced Heroquest (Floorplans & Counters, 1989)
- Battlecars and the expansion Battlebikes
- Cry Havoc
- Curse of the Mummy's Tomb
- Fantasy Warlord
- Cadwallon
- Devil Kings
- HeroQuest (Cards and rulebook)
- Terror of the Lichemaster
