= Kiria =

Kiria may refer to:

- Shalva Kiria, Soviet Georgian fighter ace of World War II
- Davit Kiria (born 1988), Georgian kickboxer
- Kiria (musician) (21st century), British singer-songwriter
- Kiria, a settlement in Adekar Municipality, Béjaïa Province, Algeria
- Kiria Kiria, an independent politician who ran in the 2004 Cook Islands general election
- Kiria Kurono (黒乃霧亜), a fictional idol and playable character in 2015 video game Tokyo Mirage Sessions ♯FE

== See also ==
- Kirian (disambiguation)
- Kirya (disambiguation)
