= Power of the Press =

Studio album by Angelic Upstarts
- Released: 1986
- Studios: Wickham Studios, Croydon
- Genres: Punk rock, Oi!
- Label: Gas Music Limited Records
- Producer: Colin Peter

Angelic Upstarts chronology
Last Tango in Moscow (1984)	Power of the Press (1986)	Blood on the Terraces (1987)

Power of the Press is Angelic Upstarts's seventh album, released in 1986. The cover illustration was by Geoff Botham.

The album was released in the United States as Brighton Bomb (1986), adding the 1985 12" single A-side "Brighton Bomb", and that single's cover art.

== Track listing ==
All tracks composed by Thomas Mensforth and Brian Hayes; except where indicated

Side A

1. "I Stand Accused" (Mensforth, Derek Wade, Ray Cowie, Tony Morrison)
2. "Nottingham Slag"
3. "Joe Where Are You Now?" (Mensforth, Ronnie Rocker)
4. "Soldier" (Harvey Andrews)
5. "Empty Street"

Side A

1. "Power of the Press" (Mensforth, Ronnie Rocker)
2. "Stab in the Back"
3. "Here I Come"
4. "Thin Red Line" (Mensforth, Ronnie Rocker)
5. "I'd Kill Her for Sixpence"
6. "Greenfields of France" (Eric Bogle)
