= Sons of Spartacus =

Studio album by Angelic Upstarts
- Released: 2002
- Studios: Trinity Heights, Newcastle-upon-Tyne
- Genres: Punk rock, Oi!
- Label: Captain Oi! Records
- Producer: Tony Van Frater

Angelic Upstarts chronology
Bombed Out (1992)	Sons of Spartacus (2002)	Bullingdon Bastards (2015)

Sons of Spartacus is Angelic Upstarts' tenth studio album, released in 2002. The album was recorded by Mensi with members of Red Alert, Red London and Leatherface.

== Track listing ==
All lyrics composed by Thomas Mensforth and all music written by Tony Van Frater; except where indicated.

Side A

1. "Safe Heaven"
2. "Lonely Man of Spandau II"
3. "Supergrass"
4. "Chuck Taylor (Ace of Hearts)"
5. "Caught in the Crossfire"
6. "Action Man" (Mensforth, Ray Cowie)
7. "Don't Get Old (In Tony's Britain)"
8. "South Shields Born 'N' Bred"

Side B

1. "Tally Ho Ginger"
2. "Maxwell Dynasty"
3. "Stop The City"
4. "The Great Divide"
5. "Bandiera Rossa" (Traditional; arranged by Thomas Mensforth and Tony Van Frater)
6. "Stand Up"
7. "Anti-Nazi"

== Personnel ==
- Thomas "Mensi" Mensforth - vocals
- Tony Van Frater - guitar, backing vocals; lead vocals on "Chuck Taylor (Ace of Hearts)"
- Gaz Stoker - bass
- Andrew "Lainey" Laing - drums
- Jammy Jones, Steve "Cast Iron" Smith - additional backing vocals

Technical

- Fred Purser - engineer, keyboards on "Maxwell Dynasty"
