= Still from the Heart =

Studio album by Angelic Upstarts
- Released: April 1982
- Genres: Punk rock, Oi!
- Label: EMI
- Producer: Steve Levine

Angelic Upstarts chronology
2,000,000 Voices (1981)	Still from the Heart (1982)	Reason Why? (1983)

Still from the Heart is Angelic Upstarts's fourth album, released in 1982.

== Track listing ==
All tracks composed by Thomas Mensforth and Ray Cowie; except where noted.

Side A

1. "Never Say Die"
2. "Flames of Brixton"
3. "Action Man"
4. "Wasted (Love By None)"
5. "Here Comes Trouble" (Mensforth, Cowie, Tony "Feedback" Morrison)

Side B

1. "Theme for Lost Souls" (Mensforth, Cowie, Steve Levine)
2. "I Stand Accused" (Mensforth, Cowie, Morrison, Derek Wade)
3. "Black Knights of the 80's" (Mensforth, Cowie, Wade)
4. "Cry Wolf" (Mensforth, Cowie, Wade)
5. "Soldier" (Harvey Andrews)

== Personnel ==
Angelic Upstarts

- Mensi - vocals
- Mond - guitar, vocals
- Tony "Feedback" Morrison - bass, vocals
- Derek "Decca" Wade - drums, percussion, backing vocals

with:

- Steve Levine - keyboards, backing vocals
- Phil Pickett - organ and backing vocals on "Here Comes Trouble"
- Steve Grainger - tenor and alto saxophone
- Tony Hughes - trumpet, trombone

Technical

- Bill Smith - sleeve
- Gered Mankowitz - photography
