= Tangerine Records (1992) =

UK-based independent record label

- Origin: Cambridgeshire, England
- Genres: Power pop
- Years active: 1992–current
- Website: tangerinerecords.com

Tangerine Records is a UK-based independent record label founded in 1992 by musician Paul Bevoir, music journalist Chris Hunt and marketing executive John Ashworth.

== History ==
Launching with a compilation of previously released material by The Jetset, throughout the 1990s the label specialised in reissuing CDs of collectable vinyl recordings, focusing on the mod, psychedelic, power pop and bubblegum pop genres. Acts released by the label have included The Jetset, The Moment, Direct Hits, Squire, The Cleaners From Venus, Dee Walker, Paul Bevoir and The V.I.P.'s.

Many of their early releases were showcased on the Tangerine Records compilation Come on Peel The Noise. The compilation also included several bands who did not have complete albums released on the label, such as Smalltown Parade, Mood Six, Melvyn and the Smartees and The Candees.

The label was refocused in 2004, moving away from the crowded re-issues market and it began to release newly recorded material, including a series of albums and singles by the band Rinaldi Sings.

== Discography ==
- The Jetset: The Best of the Jetset (Tang CD1) 1992
- Paul Bevoir: The Happiest Days of Your Life (Tang CD2) 1992
- The Cleaners From Venus: Golden Cleaners (Tang CD3) 1993
- Squire: Big Smashes (Tang CD4) 1992
- The Jetset: The Best of the Jetset Too! (Tang CD5) 1993
- Dee Walker: Jump Back (Tang CD6) 1993
- Squire: Get Ready To Go (Tang CD7) 1994
- Paul Bevoir: Dumb Angel (Tang CD8) 1994
- Direct Hits: The Magic Attic (Tang CD9) 1995
- The Moment: Mod Gods (Tang CD10) 1996
- Various Artists: Come on Peel The Noise (Tang CD11) 1995
- The VIPS: Beat Crazy (Tang CD12) 1997
- The Cleaners From Venus: Back From The Cleaners (Tang CD14) 1995
- Rinaldi Sings: "Avenues And Alleyways" single (Tang CDS015) 2004
- Rinaldi Sings: What's It All About? (Tang CD016) 2005
- Rinaldi Sings: "Come Fly With Me" single (Tang CDS017) 2005
- Rinaldi Sings: Bingo (Tang CD018) 2008

== See also ==
- List of record labels
- Tangerine Records (disambiguation)
