= Michael Willetts =

Recipient of the George Cross

Michael Willetts GC
- Born: 13 August 1943; Sutton-in-Ashfield, Nottinghamshire
- Died: 25 May 1971 (aged 27); Springfield Road Police Station, Belfast
- Military career
- Allegiance: United Kingdom
- Branch: British Army
- Service years: 1962–1971
- Rank: Sergeant
- Units: 3rd Battalion, Parachute Regiment
- Conflicts: Operation Banner †
- Awards: George Cross

Michael Willetts, GC (13 August 1943 – 25 May 1971) was one of the first British soldiers to be killed during the Troubles in Northern Ireland, and the recipient of a posthumous George Cross for his heroism in saving lives during the Provisional Irish Republican Army bombing which claimed his own. The Harvey Andrews song "Soldier" commemorates Willetts.

== Early life ==
Born in 1943 in Sutton-in-Ashfield, Nottinghamshire, England, Michael Willetts entered a local colliery after leaving school but found that he did not suit the job and joined the British Army in 1962, serving in the 3rd Battalion of the Parachute Regiment. He married his wife, Sandra and had two children, Dean and Trudy, during his time in the army. After several tours abroad and a promotion to sergeant, Willetts was dispatched with the rest of his regiment to Northern Ireland at the outbreak of violence there between Irish nationalists and the Royal Ulster Constabulary in 1971. Placed with his squad at Springfield Road police station in Belfast, Willetts engaged in local operations until 25 May 1971, when he was killed in a Provisional IRA bomb attack on the barracks.

== George Cross ==
Willetts was killed in Springfield Road RUC station by the Provisional IRA. A man in his mid-twenties emerged from a car and threw a suitcase containing a blast bomb into the lobby of the station. Willetts thrust two children and two adults into a corner and stood above them as the 30 lbs of explosives detonated, seriously injuring him. Seven RUC officers, two British soldiers and eighteen civilians were injured in the attack. Willetts was fatally injured by a chunk of metal from a locker which had struck him in the back of the head. As he was being removed by ambulance, he and the injured officers were jeered by local youths who screamed obscenities at them. Willetts died after two hours on the operating table at Royal Victoria Hospital.

== Medal citation ==
The George Cross was presented to Sergeant Willett's widow in June and the citation appeared in the London Gazette at the same time.

The Queen has been graciously pleased to approve the posthumous award of the George Cross to:
23910067 Sergeant Michael WILLETTS, The Parachute Regiment.

At 8.24 p.m. on the evening of 25th May 1971, a terrorist entered the reception hall of the Springfield Road Police Station in Belfast. He carried a suitcase from which a smoking fuse protruded, dumped it quickly on the floor and fled outside. Inside the room were a man and a woman, two children and several police officers. One of the latter saw at once the smoking case and raised the alarm. The Police Officers began to organise the evacuation of the hall past the reception desk, through the reception office and out by a door into the rear passage.

Sergeant Michael Willetts was on duty in the inner hall. Hearing the alarm, he sent an N.C.O. up to the first floor to warn those above and hastened himself to the door towards which a Police Officer was thrusting those in the reception hall and office. He held the door open while all passed safely through and then stood in the doorway, shielding those taking cover. In the next moment, the bomb exploded with terrible force.

Sergeant Willetts was mortally wounded. His duty did not require him to enter the threatened area: his post was elsewhere. He knew well, after 4 months service in Belfast, the peril of going towards a terrorist bomb but he did not hesitate to do so. All those approaching the door from the far side agree that if they had had to check to open the door they would have perished. Even when they had reached the rear passage, Sergeant Willetts waited, placing his body as a screen to shelter them. By this considered act of bravery, he risked – and lost – his life for those of the adults and children. His selflessness, his courage are beyond praise. 22nd June 1971

London Gazette, 21 June 1971
