= David Houghton (designer) =

David Houghton is an English graphic artist, designer and photographer.

As a conceptual artist, his photographic work "explores and documents ordinary everyday images and situations that we normally overlook and take for granted”. He has published two independent books of his work. An exhibition of his conceptual art entitled Journeys Within Japan was staged in the summer of 2007 as part of the Cambridge Open Studios project and later at the Basement Gallery in Ipswich. In December 2008 he was also a featured artist in the CAMBA art exhibition Six Days, alongside notable artists such as Jeremy Andrews.

Houghton's latest solo show is 'Time Watching', staged by the University of Hertfordshire at the Margaret Harvey Gallery in St Albans in March 2009.

In 2002 he appeared in the BBC1 television programme Beckham For Breakfast, when his travels around Japan with journalist Chris Hunt were featured in a video diary filmed by Hunt. His photography of football fans and football culture around the world has been published in many magazines, including Match, Four Four Two, Football First and Sport First. As a CD sleeve designer, his work has included What's It All About by Rinaldi Sings and The Mod Singles Collection by The Chords.
