= So Far Away (album) =

Studio album by The Chords
- Released: 15 May 1980
- Recorded: Dec–Jan 1980
- Studio: Redan Recorders, Bayswater
- Genre: Mod revival, power pop
- Label: Polydor POLS 1019, cass POLSC 1019; Captain Mod (reissue)
- Producer: Andy Arthurs

The Chords chronology
So Far Away (1980)	No One Is Listening Anymore (1986)

Professional ratings
Review scores
Source	Rating
AllMusic	4.5/5 stars
Smash Hits	5/10

So Far Away is The Chords debut album. It reached a peak of number 30 on the U.K. albums chart in a three-week chart run. The cover was inspired by the second LP by The Spencer Davis Group.

== Track listing ==
All songs written & composed by Chris Pope except as noted.

Side one

1. "Maybe Tomorrow"
2. "Happy Families"
3. "Breaks My Heart"
4. "Tumbling Down"
5. "Hold On, I'm Coming" (Hayes/Porter)
6. "I'm Not Sure"

Side two

1. "Something's Missing"
2. "It's No Use"
3. "What Are We Gonna Do Now" (Billy Hassett)
4. "She Said, She Said" (Lennon–McCartney)
5. "Dreamdolls" (Chris Pope/Billy Hassett)
6. "So Far Away"

== Personnel ==
The Chords

- Billy Hassett – lead vocals, rhythm guitar
- Chris Pope — lead guitar, backing vocals; lead vocals on "Hold On, I'm Coming" and "Dreamdolls"
- Martin Mason — bass, backing vocals
- Brett Ascott — drums

Additional personnel

- Mick Talbot — piano on "Breaks My Heart", "Hold On, I'm Coming" and "I'm Not Sure"

Photography: Gered Mankowitz
