= Purple Hearts (British band) =

English mod revival band

- Origin: Romford, England
- Genres: Power pop, mod revival
- Years active: 1977–1982, 1984–1986, 1999, 2009–present
- Labels: Fiction, Safari, Razor Records
- Members: Jeff Shadbolt; Simon Stebbing; Bob Manton; Gary Sparks
- Past members: Nick Lake
- Website: Purplehearts.co.uk

Purple Hearts are an English mod revival band, formed in 1977 in Romford, eastern Greater London. They were often considered one of the best English mod revival groups, the NME calling them "one of the few mod bands to actually cut it on rock 'n' roll terms".

== Career ==
Purple Hearts started in 1977, when teenagers Jeff Shadbolt, Simon Stebbing, Bob Manton, and Nick Lake formed the band in Romford as The Sockets, before they even knew how to play their instruments. They formed for the purpose of getting a support slot at a Buzzcocks gig at the East London Polytechnic, to debut their tongue-in-cheek rock opera, Reg.

In 1978, their drummer Nick Lake broke his leg. He was replaced by Gary Sparks from Romford punk outfit, 1348. The band switched their name to Purple Hearts, after an amphetamine-barbiturate mixture popular with the mods of the 1960s. Accordingly, they changed their sound from the rough-edged punk rock, to a more mod-influenced sound, which, thanks largely to The Jam, was beginning to capture public attention. In September 1979, the band scored a minor hit with their debut single, "Millions Like Us" which reached number 57 in the UK Singles Chart. The band then toured the UK with Secret Affair and Back To Zero on 'the march of the mods' tour in 1979. The band's second single, "Frustration" was released in November that year. A tour of the UK to promote the single followed.

In 1980, the band released their debut album, Beat That!. The album was produced by Chris Parry of Fiction Records. The single taken from the album, "Jimmy", gave the band another minor hit reaching number 60 in the UK chart in March 1980. After the commercial failure of Beat That, the band parted company with Fiction Records, before signing a one-off single deal with Safari which produced the "My Life`s A Jigsaw" single, produced by Andy Arthurs. The record did make the BBC Radio One playlist, but did not make the national charts. A final single, "Plane Crash" was released in 1982, on the independent record label Roadrunner Records before the band split up in November of that year after a failed American trip.

After the Hearts, Jeff Shadbolt joined The Rage, who included Brett Ascott from The Chords. Gary Sparks joined High Zierra with former members of Department S, Tony Lourdan, Mark Taylor and Michael Herbage. Simon Stebbing joined Hearts on Fire who recorded an album Dreams of Leaving and two EPs for Midnite Records. Bob Manton joined Simon Stebbing and Peter Green in cosmic country rockers Owen and the Deacons.

Purple Hearts resurfaced in 1984 to release a live album, Head on Collision Time (1985) recorded live at the 100 Club, and their second studio effort, Popish Frenzy (1986). A single "Friends Again" taken from this album was released on Unicorn Records. In 1986 the group toured West Germany, Austria and The Netherlands before once again calling it a day. They re-convened at the Mods Mayday '99 show, recorded for the Detour Records live compilation album. In 2003, Stebbing produced a rarities compilation, Smashing Time, also released on Detour Records.

In 2000 Stebbing formed RT4 with Gary along with Mike Herbage and Mark Taylor from Department S, they gigged for 5 years. Simon then went on to form Speakeasy with Mark Le Gallez (the Risk and Thee Jenerators) after an initial EP on Biff Bang Pow Records, with guests Fay Hallam (Makin Time) on Hammond organ and the late Mike Evans (the Action / Mighty Baby) on bass, Speakeasy released a self-titled album on Detour Records in 2010, then Trouble their second LP released on Twist records in 2014 with Ian Jones (The Affair / Long Tall Shorty) as new bassist. Speakeasy continue to play occasional shows, and started recording a third album in 2016. In 2008 Bob Manton reappeared fronting the short lived Norwich garage band The Alley Jaggers.

The band re-formed in 2009 and played all over the UK and Europe including Dublin, Vienna and Madrid. They continued playing from 2009 to 2014. The band released a new live album from the 2009 tour in April 2010 called Purple Hearts Live! with Pride and Joy Records. This included the band's first new material in 25 years with the track "Urban Soul".

== Discography ==
=== Studio albums ===
- Beat That! (Fiction) 1980
- Pop-ish Frenzy (Razor) 1986

=== Live albums ===
- Head on Collision Time (Razor) 1985 – recorded live at the 100 Club in December 1984
- Purple Hearts – Live! (Pride and Joy) 2010 - recorded live at Camber Sands in July 2009

=== Compilation albums ===
- Head on Collision Time Again! (Yeaah) 1999 – combined the two Razor LPs
- Head on Collision Time Again / Pop-ish Frenzy (Rhythm Vicar) 2002
- Smashing Time (Detour) 2003 – collection of unreleased demos and live material
- Mod Singles Collection (Captain Mod) 2009
- Extraordinary Sensations - Studio & Live 1979-1986 2024

=== Singles ===
- "Millions Like Us" (Fiction) August 1979 - UK No. 57
- "Frustration" (Fiction) November 1979
- "Jimmy" (Fiction) February 1980 - UK No. 60
- "My Life's a Jigsaw" (Safari) September 1980
- "Plane Crash" (Roadrunner) August 1982
- "Friends Again" (Unicorn) August 1986
