= Melvyn J Taub =

- Born: 7 September 1960; London, England
- Died: 23 September 2024 (aged 64)
- Years active: 1970s–2024
- Formerly of: The Jetset

Melvyn J Taub (born 7 September 1960) was a British, London-based tour and promotion manager and some-time pop/rock singer and actor, primarily known for his role as singer in 1980s bubblegum pop band The Jetset and as a part of Mari Wilson's touring revue band, The Wilsations.

== Early life ==
Melvyn Jeremy Taub was born in London, England, the only son of Wilfred Taub (originally Schlachtaub) and Adela Robin. He attended the Clapton Jewish Day School (now Simon Marks Jewish Primary School), where he met his future Jetset bandmate Angus Nanan, before continuing his education at Central Foundation Boys' School.

== Career ==
=== The Jetset ===
Along with teenage friend Paul Bevoir, Taub formed the Jetset in July 1981; the band developed their style under the guidance of former Advertising and Secret Affair drummer Paul Bultitude, playing their first gig at the Rock Garden in Covent Garden, London, in 1981, and gaining valuable live experience as a touring support act to Secret Affair later the same year and during 1982.

The band focused on creating and marketing bubblegum pop music. Their style and merchandise were influenced by the work of The Monkees and The Beatles. From the beginning The Jetset presented themselves as already every bit as famous as their 1960s heroes. The band's marketing sowed the seeds of Jetset myth before they were even well known. An eye-catching EP sleeve included the band clowning around in stills "from their forthcoming TV series", hanging out of the Monkee-influenced ‘Jetsetmobile’ (a very English Ford Capri with customised ‘JETSET’ number plates). They even had a suitably barmy Jetset cartoon strip that appeared in Shadows & Reflections, the underground magazine of long-time Jetset champion Chris Hunt.

Taub added the trademark nasal vocals to The Jetset's authentic 1960s pop sound, and the band went on to record five albums before their acrimonious split in 1988. As Paul Bevoir started to assume more control of the band's direction and sound, and took on more of the singing duties, Bultitude and Taub quit the band, leaving Bevoir to finish the final Jetset album without them. Bevoir had occasionally appeared live as The Jetset without Taub, most notably on a tour of the United States in 1986.

=== Mari Wilson's Wilsations ===
Through their connection with Bultitude, Bevoir and Taub had temporarily joined Mari Wilson's Wilsations as backing vocalists in 1981. Bevoir soon left to focus on his own music, while Taub went on to enjoy chart success with the Wilsations, before returning to work with Bevoir in The Jetset.

=== Actor ===
As an actor, Taub appeared in It's All True, an Arena television film in the early 1980s, starring alongside Koo Stark and directed by Julien Temple, as well as in a number of TV commercials worldwide.

=== Later career ===
Early demos recorded by Taub have subsequently been released under the name of Melvyn And the Smartys, but after the demise of The Jetset, he continued to work in the music industry as an international press and promotions manager for EastWest Records and Sony Music.

Upon leaving Sony in 2003, he continued to work with Oasis, Travis, Simple Minds, Big Audio Dynamite, Craig David, Taio Cruz, Bill Wyman, Orbital and Simply Red on a freelance basis. He later went on to form The International Department, an international music promotion and marketing company, with Paul Bultitude and Doe Phillips. Melvyn continues to work closely with Manic Street Preachers, Marc Almond, Mick Hucknall, Grace Jones, and Jake Bugg in promotional and tour management roles, as well as currently enjoying huge success with Isle Of Wight sensations Wet Leg whom he co-manages with Martin Hall.

== Death ==
Taub died from Pancreatic cancer on 23 September 2024, sixteen days after his 64th birthday.

Actor Michelle Collins, a friend of Taub, helped raise £25,000 for North London Hospice in his memory.

Taub’s wife Nicole Taub and children Ginny Taub and Asa Taub along with his closest friends, put on a gig at the 100 club. The Jetset reunited in Taub’s memory to raise money for Pancreatic Cancer UK
