= Paul Bevoir =

- Born: 20 May 1960 (age 66); Islington, London, England
- Genres: Power pop
- Years active: 1981-current
- Labels: Dance Network; Sanctuary; Deltic Records; Accident Records
- Website: Official website

Paul Bevoir (born 20 May 1960 in Islington, London, England) is an English pop-rock songwriter and musician. He is probably best known as a member of the 1980s English pop band the Jetset, who were associated with the British mod revival.

== Early life ==
Paul grew up in Islington, London, England, with a passion for pop music and pop culture. He attended Woodberry Down Comprehensive School, Manor House, North London, at the same time as the members of ska band Bad Manners, who were formed at the school, and after performing in a series of local bands himself, such as the Double Agents and the Cyclones, Bevoir formed The Jetset with friend and ice cream man Melvyn J Taub in July 1981.

== The Jetset ==
While Taub was predominantly the voice of The Jetset, Bevoir was the principle songwriter and along with record producer Paul Bultitude, a partner in the Dance Network, the band's record label. Along with Angus Nanan and Paul Bonin, the band played their first gig at the Rock Garden in Covent Garden, London, in 1981 Bonin departed the group in 1985 and was eventually replaced by Mickey Dias. The Jetset went on to release five albums before their acrimonious demise in 1988.

During his tenure with The Jetset, Bevoir temporarily joined Mari Wilson's Wilsations as a backing vocalist in 1981 before leaving to focus on his own music. He also found time to produce other acts, working alongside Edward Ball to produce The Moment's 1985 debut album, The Work Gets Done.

== Smalltown Parade ==
When The Jetset disbanded in 1988, Bevoir formed a new group Smalltown Parade, releasing three singles in the UK and two albums, which were released in Japan only. The first UK single "Sunday Way of Life" was released on Captain Sensible's Deltic Records in 1990. The following year, "And We Dance On" was released as a single.

== Solo career ==
In 1985, while The Jetset were still an ongoing concern, Bevoir recorded his own first solo debut album, The Happiest Days of Your Life. Just prior to his debut album, Bevoir wrote and performed the song "It's Gotta Stop Somewhere", which was included on two LPs released by the Compact Organization record label.

Bevoir's second solo album of entirely original material, Dumb Angel, was released in March 1994 on Tangerine Records in the UK and Polystar Records in Japan. After the success of his song "Tadaima", recorded by the Japanese duo Puffy selling 500,000 copies in 1997, Bevoir began work on his next solo album In Days of Wonder. This album was finally completed in April 2008 and released in the UK on Accident Records.

== Songwriter ==
Bevoir's songs have been recorded by many other artists, including Edward Ball, Mari Wilson, Dee Walker, Puffy, The Candees, Sarah Brookes, Thereza Bazar, The Eddies, The Go-Bangs, Oserockets, The Gonks, Jeremy Morris and Roy Hamilton. In 1985 "Time Machine", a song that Bevoir had written for the band of an old friend, was released twice in the UK by Paul Hardcastle, under the band names Direct Drive and First Light. In 1995 a compilation of cover versions of his songs was released by Polystar Records in Japan. He also contributed to the 2005 debut album by Rinaldi Sings, co-writing one song for the album in addition to tracks released as b-sides. In 2009 Twist Records released, Do You Wanna Be in the Show: A Pop Tribute to The Jetset, featuring 17 artists covering Bevoir's compositions, including The Risk, The Spring Collection and Cola Jet Set

In 2010, Bevoir began writing lyrics for songs composed with Spanish singer and musician es:Guille Milkyway for the animated children's TV series Jelly Jamm which is currently being screened on the Cartoon Network channel Cartoonito and Channel 5 in the UK and another 180 countries around the world. In July 2013, the Bevoir/Milkyway composed song "Holding Hands Around The World" won the award for 'Best Song in a Children's TV Show' at the annual Festival El Chupete Awards in Madrid, Spain.

In 2016, Bevoir teamed-up once again with songwriter es:Guille Milkyway to co-compose the theme song and four other songs for a new animated TV series PINY: Institute of New York.

== Additional work ==
In addition to his writing and performing credits, Bevoir also makes his living as a CD sleeve designer, and his work has graced the covers of reissues by Elvis Presley, Ronnie Lane, The Kinks, Family, Lindisfarne, Jeff Beck, Honeybus and Fleetwood Mac. He initially gained experience designing the covers for all of the original Jetset albums.

== Discography ==
=== Solo albums ===
- The Happiest Days of Your Life (1985)
- Dumb Angel (1994)
- In Days of Wonder (2008)
- A Balloon to the Moon (2021)
