= The Reasons Why =

The Reasons Why may refer to:

- The Reasons Why (album), a 1994 album by country singer Michelle Wright
- Reasons Why: The Very Best, by Nickel Creek
- The Reasons Why, a band with no recordings, featuring future members of Kansas (band)

== See also ==
- Reason (argument)
- The Reason Why
- Reason Why?
