= 2,000,000 Voices =

Studio album by Angelic Upstarts
- Released: June 1981
- Recorded: September 1980, March 1981
- Studios: Trident Studios, London; EMI Studios, Abbey Road, London
- Genres: Punk rock, Oi!
- Label: EMI
- Producers: Angelic Upstarts, Ashley Goodall, Peter Wilson

Angelic Upstarts chronology
We Gotta Get Out of This Place (1980)	2,000,000 Voices (1981)	Still from the Heart (1982)

2,000,000 Voices is Angelic Upstarts's third album, released in 1981. Several tracks feature artists such as Paul Thompson of Roxy Music, Jake Burns of Stiff Little Fingers, and Terry Sharpe of The Starjets.

== Track listing ==
All tracks composed by Thomas Mensforth and Ray Cowie; except where noted

Side A

1. "Two Million Voices"
2. "Ghost Town"
3. "You're Nicked"
4. "England"
5. "Heath's Lament" (Thomas Mensforth)
6. "Guns For The Afghan Rebels"
7. "I Understand"

Side B

8. "Mensi's Marauders"
9. "Mr. Politician"
10. "Kids On the Streets"
11. "Jimmy"
12. "We're Gonna Take the World"
13. "Last Night Another Soldier"
14. "I Wish"

== Personnel ==
Angelic Upstarts

- Mensi (Thomas Mensforth) - vocals, trumpet, cello
- Mond (Raymond Cowie) - acoustic and electric guitar, backing vocals, percussion
- Glyn Warren - bass, washboard
- Derek "Decca" Wade - drums, percussion, backing vocals

with:

- Paul Thompson - drums on "England", "Heath's Lament", "Kids On the Street" and "Jimmy"
- Mickey Smailes - piano on "I Wish"
- Simon Wilson - saxophone
- Johnny Van Derrick - violin

Technical

- Chris Stone, Pat Stapley - engineer
- Keith Breeden - cover art
