= The Jetset =

- Origin: London, England
- Genres: Pop, rock, power pop, mod revival
- Years active: 1979–1988
- Labels: The Dance Network
- Past members: Melvyn J Taub, vocals Paul Bevoir, guitar Paul Bonin, bass Angus Nanan, keyboards Mickey Dias, drums

The Jetset were a 1980s English pop band, who were associated with the British mod revival.

== Career ==
Formed in 1979 by teenage friends Paul Bevoir and Melvyn J Taub, the band developed their style under the guidance of former Advertising and Secret Affair drummer, Paul Bultitude. After recording a few demos with Bultitude, Bevoir and Taub pulled together a makeshift band for promotional photos, enlisting keyboardist Angus Nanan and bassist Paul Bonin.

Gaining valuable live experience as a touring support act to Secret Affair in 1981 and 1982, through their connection with Bultitude, Bevoir and Taub temporarily joined Mari Wilson's Wilsations as backing vocalists in 1981. Bevoir soon left to focus on his own music, while Taub went on to enjoy chart success with the Wilsations, before returning to work with Bevoir in The Jetset.

In 1983 Bultitude signed the band to his Dance Network label in 1983 and released their debut, The Best of the Jetset EP. From the beginning The Jetset presented themselves as being as famous as their heroes The Monkees. The band's marketing sowed the seeds of the Jetset myth before they were even well known. Their eye-catching EP sleeve included the band clowning around in stills "from their forthcoming TV series", hanging out of the Monkee-influenced 'Jetsetmobile' (a Ford Capri with customised 'JETSET' number plates). On the musical side, Bevoir had penned a quartet of tunes for the EP, including "The Jetset Theme", billed as an 'original soundtrack recording'. With an inspired promotional push, the EP was sent to the press accompanied by merchandise including Jetset posters, badges, stickers, key rings and bubblegum cards. Mod fanzines followed suit, helping to stoke the fires of Jetsetmania. Soon a Jetset cartoon strip appeared in Shadows & Reflections, the underground magazine of long-time Jetset champion Chris Hunt. The group even released their own Christmas flexi-disc through Shadows & Reflections in December 1983.

There Goes the Neighborhood, their first full-length album was released in 1985. The album was well reviewed in the UK music press and it was followed by Go Bananas, an album which featured commercials for Jetset products between songs. Bevoir retired from touring to concentrate on his songwriting and together with Bultitude created the lushly orchestrated Vaudeville Park.

The band released their final album, Five, shortly before their acrimonious demise in 1988.

== Legacy ==
The Jetset's music has been reissued numerous times. In 2010, Cherry Red Records released Swings & Roundabouts: The Very Best of the Jetset.,

In 2009 Twist Records released, Do You Wanna Be in the Show: A Pop Tribute to The Jetset, featuring 17 artists covering Bevoir's compositions, including The Risk, The Spring Collection, The Shambles and The Cola Jet Set.

== Discography ==
=== Albums ===
- There Goes the Neighbourhood (1985)
- Go Bananas (1986)
- April, May, June and the Jetset (1986)
- Vaudeville Park (1987)
- Five (1988)
