= The Moment (band) =

Background information
- Origin: Haverhill, Suffolk, England
- Genres: Mod revival, power pop
- Years active: 1983–1990
- Labels: Tangerine Records; Big Stuff; Rave Records; Diamond Records
- Members: Adrian Holder (guitar/vocals); Robert Moore (bass/vocals); Brett "Buddy" Ascott (drums)
- Past members: Antony Lambdon (drums 1983–86); Neil Clitheroe (drums 1986); Martin Colegate (drums 1987–90); Steve Rinaldi (trombone/vocals 1986–90); Gary Malby (sax/vocals 1986–90)

The Moment were among the leading bands of the 1980s UK mod revival, described retrospectively by Paul Moody of the NME as "English pop music's greatest ever secret".

Formed in Haverhill, Suffolk, in 1983, The Moment were fronted by the singer-songwriter, Adrian Holder, releasing a series of singles, including "In This Town" (1984), "One, Two They Fly" (1985) and "Ready To Fall" (1988). They released one album, The Work Gets Done, in 1985. "Sticks And Stones", a track released on the Countdown compilation album in 1986, saw The Moment described by British music paper Melody Maker as sounding "like The Jam wanting to be The Clash". While their influences did indeed include the best of British mod and punk, they also drew their inspiration from The Beatles, northern soul and classic rock, taking their name from song "The Unguarded Moment" by Australian neo-psychedelic rock band The Church.

The Moment were managed by UK music journalist Chris Hunt. They toured extensively in Germany, where they maintained a strong cult following until their split in 1990. All of their vinyl recordings, and their unreleased final single, were collected together and issued as, Mod Gods: The Best Of The Moment by Tangerine Records in 1996. Singer Adrian Holder now lives in Germany, and released his first solo recording since The Moment, Goodbye Tuesday, on a Biff Bang Pow Records compilation album in 2006. Bass player, Robert Moore, subsequently joined Paul Bevoir in Smalltown Parade, supporting Take That on a short UK tour in 1992. Steve Rinaldi released his debut solo album, What's It All About? under the name of Rinaldi Sings in 2005.

The Moment worked with several record producers during their career. Cult musicians Paul Bevoir and Edward Ball shared the production duties on the album The Work Gets Done (Rave, 1985). Paul Bultitude was responsible for "Poor Mr Diamond" (Big Stuff, 1988), while "Sticks And Stones" (Countdown, 1986) was produced by Pat Collier and Will Birch. Their later material was in the hands of Ian Shaw, who also engineered all their recordings from 1985 onwards.

In 2016 The Moment released a new album, The Only Truth Is Music, and a follow-up EP Know It All on the Infenzo Label, and also toured the UK with ex-Chords drummer Brett "Buddy" Ascott.
