= We Gotta Get Out of This Place (album) =

Studio album by Angelic Upstarts
- Released: April 3, 1980
- Genres: Punk rock, Oi!
- Label: Warner Bros.
- Producer: Pete Wilson

Angelic Upstarts chronology
Teenage Warning (1979)	We Gotta Get Out of This Place (1980)	2,000,000 Voices (1981)

Professional ratings
Review scores
Source	Rating
Smash Hits	5/10
AllMusic	3.5/5

We Gotta Get Out of This Place is Angelic Upstarts's second album, released in 1980. The album was dedicated to Jimmy Laurenson "the best friend and workmate anyone would wish for. We will never forget. Rest in Peace Jim."

== Track listing ==
All songs written by Thomas Mensforth and Ray Cowie, except where noted.

Side A

1. "Never 'Ad Nothin'" - 2.46
2. "Police Oppression" - 3.14
3. "Lonely Man of Spandau" - 2.49
4. "Their Destiny Is Coming" - 2.42
5. "Shotgun Solution" (Mensforth, Keith "Stix" Warrington) - 2.17
6. "King Coal" (Mensforth, Cowie, Warrington, Taylor) - 3.38

Side B

1. "Out of Control" - 2.24
2. "Ronnie is a Rocker" - 2.31
3. "Listen To The Steps" (Mensforth, Cowie, Warrington, Taylor) - 2.36
4. "Can't Kill a Legend" - 3.10
5. "Capital City" (Mensforth, Cowie, Warrington) - 3.06
6. "We Gotta Get Out of This Place" (Barry Mann, Cynthia Weil) - 4.02

Bonus tracks

1. "Nowhere Left to Hide"
2. "Unsung Heroes II"

== Personnel ==
Angelic Upstarts

- Thomas "Mensi" Mensforth - vocals
- Ray "Mond" Cowie - guitar
- Steve Forsten - bass guitar
- Keith "Stix" Warrington - drums

with:

- Jim "Fingers" Reilly, Pete Wilson - piano
- Angela, Barry, Kevin, Melvin, Phil, Spud the Starjet, Vandepeer, Zippy - backing vocals
- Nick Hockley - design, illustration
