= Tangerine Records =

Tangerine Records is the name of at least two different record labels:

- Tangerine Records (1962) – a United States-based company
- Tangerine Records (1990) – a United Kingdom-based company
- Tangerine Records (1992) – a United Kingdom-based mod and powerpop record company

== See also ==
- List of record labels
