= Angelic Upstarts =

English punk rock/Oi! band

- Also known as: The Upstarts
- Origin: South Shields, England
- Genres: Punk rock, Oi!
- Years active: 1977–present
- Labels: Warner Bros., EMI, Anagram Records, Picasso Records, Link Records, Razor Records, Captain Oi!
- Members: Neil 'Newts' Newton; John Woodward; Mick Robson; Andy Wilkinson
- Past members: Thomas 'Mensi' Mensforth; Ray 'Mond' Cowie; Derek 'Decca' Wade; Steve Forsten; Ronnie Wooden; Glyn Warren; Tony Feedback; Ronnie Rocker; Max Splodge; Evo; Keith Sticks Warrington; Paul Thompson; Chris Wright; Jonnie Halling; Brett Mulvaney; Dickie Hammond; Steve Straughan; Brian Hayes; Gaz 'Geordie' Stoker; Tony Van Frater

Angelic Upstarts are an English punk rock / Oi! band formed in South Shields in 1977. AllMusic calls them "one of the period's most politically charged and thought-provoking groups". The band espouse an anti-fascist and socialist working class philosophy, and have been associated with the punk and skinhead subcultures.

The band released eight studio albums in their first decade. After a brief split they reformed in 1988, and a number of times subsequently, with new albums appearing in 1992, 2002, 2011, and 2016. More than two decades after its release, their debut single, "The Murder of Liddle Towers", was included in Mojo magazine's list of the best punk rock singles of all time.

== Biography ==
Inspired by The Clash, Angelic Upstarts formed in Brockley Whins, South Shields, South Tyneside in 1977. The following year they self-released their debut single, "The Murder of Liddle Towers/Police Oppression", and recorded the first of three Peel Sessions. In 1979, aided by Jimmy Pursey, they signed to major label Warner Bros. Records for two albums: Teenage Warning (produced by Pursey) and We Gotta Get Out of This Place; the first and its title track were both Top 30 hits. The same year, the band made tabloid headlines following a gig in HM Prison Acklington, and also played on Rock Against Racism's 'Militant Entertainment' tour.

Two Upstarts tracks including 1980 single "Last Night Another Soldier" were included on the same year's various artists compilation Oi! The Album, beginning the band's association with the Oi! subgenre, a label which singer Mensi later rejected. In 1981 the band signed to EMI's revived Zonophone imprint for three further albums: 2,000,000 Voices and Angelic Upstarts Live in 1981 - top 40/Top 30 hits respectively - and Still from the Heart in 1982. According to Louder Than War, 2,000,000 Voices is "full of variety while giving up none of their energy, drive and honesty.. it was the perfect record for the Upstarts and the era. Still retaining the Punk might, but working in Reggae and Folk influences, presenting a band perfectly in tune with the turbulent times of 1981". Still From The Heart saw the group embrace "a larger sonic palette. Tentative new wave influences, inflections of dub, and expressive horn sections are all over the album".

In 1983 the band released the first in a series of independent albums, Reason Why?, "the strongest Angelic Upstarts record", which included the "Woman in Disguise" single, described by Allmusic as "perfect pop". Last Tango in Moscow followed in 1984, described by the Sunderland Echo as "another strong album", by which time Mensi was the band's only original member. Angelic Upstarts' next album Power of the Press (1986) was re-released in the US the following year, renamed for the inclusion of 1985's Brighton Bomb single. The Blood on the Terraces album followed in 1987.

Due to their anti-fascist stance and subsequent support of Anti-Fascist Action, the band were targeted by the neo-nazi Blood & Honour group, and their set at 1988 concert 'Oi! The Main Event' had to be abandoned due to crowd violence, although songs were included on the eponymous tie-in live album on Link Records as well as later Upstarts compilation Lost and Found. Despite far-right claims to the contrary, Angelic Upstarts were gigging in London again within a year.

Bombed Out (1992) was the band's last album for a decade, featuring original guitarist Mond and hailed as a return to form. Mensi formed a new Upstarts line-up for 2002's Sons of Spartacus with members of Red Alert, Red London and Leatherface. In 2006-7 Mensi briefly left the band, with Chris Wright of Crashed Out taking over vocal duties, although the return of Decca Wade on drums meant that the band retained an original member; in 2011 the band released a split album with Crashed Out, The Dirty Dozen. 2016 saw a new Angelic Upstarts line-up release what was to become their final studio album, Bullingdon Bastards.

== Lineups ==
The band's original members were Thomas Mensforth (Mensi) on vocals, Ray Cowie (Mond) on guitar, Steve Forsten on bass guitar, and Derek "Decca" Wade on drums. Keith Bell was the manager until 1980, when he was jailed for four and a half years for arson.

Other former members include guitarist Ronnie Rocker and bassists Ronnie Wooden, Glyn Warren and Tony 'Feedback' Morrison (Long Tall Shorty and Kiria's live band). Drummers have included Keith "Sticks" Warrington (who later joined Cockney Rejects), Paul Thompson (ex-Roxy Music), Chris Wright, Evo (who has also played in The Blood, Major Accident and Warfare).

Wade rejoined the band for a few years before leaving again. Brian Hayes (also of Blaggers ITA, Long Tall Shorty) originally joined the band as the second guitarist until Mond left, leaving Hayes as the only guitarist. Tony Van Frater (Red Alert) was Mensi's main songwriting partner for the Sons of Spartacus album in 2002.

In August 2006, Mensi announced he was resigning, but requested that the band continue with Chris Wright (of the band Crashed Out) on vocals. The band's lineup became Wright on vocals, Dickie Hammond on guitar, Neil "Newts" Newton on guitar, Gaz "Geordie" Stoker on bass and Wade on drums. In the latter part of 2007, Mensi rejoined the band and the lineup became Mensi on vocals, Gaz "Geordie" Stoker on bass, Hammond on guitar, Newts on guitar and Brett Mulvaney (and later Jonnie Halling) on drums. In October 2018 Gaz "Geordie" Stoker left the band and was replaced by John Woodward (Long Tall Shorty, The Straps, The Gonads). In January 2020, after 14 years and two albums with the band, Neil "Newts" Newton, took time out to complete university and was replaced by Mick Robson. The lineup becoming Mensi on vocals, Mick Robson on guitar, John Woodward on bass and Andy Wilkinson on drums. Having completed his course, Newts rejoined the band to perform at a charity tribute show for Mensi, with Chris Wright standing in on vocal duties and the final Angelic Upstarts line-up of Andy Wilkinson on drums, John Woodward on bass, Mick Robson on guitar with Newts Newton on guitar.

Former guitarist Tony Van Frater died on 29 October 2015. Dickie Hammond died two days later. On 22 February 2021, former member Tony Morrison (aka Tony Feedback) died after contracting COVID-19. Thomas Mensforth (aka Mensi or Mensi Marx) died on 10 December 2021, aged 65, after also being infected with COVID-19.

== Influence ==
Angelic Upstarts are regarded as pioneers of the Oi! punk subgenre. In 2001, Various Artists cover album We Are The People was released in tribute to the Upstarts, including tracks from bands such as Leatherface, The Oppressed, Red London and Red Alert. In 2009, punk-influenced singer-songwriter Jamie T sampled vocals from the album Angelic Upstarts Live on his song "The Man's Machine".

== Discography ==
=== Studio albums ===
- Teenage Warning (August 1979, Warner Bros. Records) - No. 29 UK
- We Gotta Get out of This Place (April 1980, WEA) - No. 54 UK
- 2,000,000 Voices (June 1981, Zonophone/EMI) - No. 32 UK
- Still from the Heart (1982, Zonophone/EMI)
- Reason Why? (1983, Anagram/Cherry Red)
- Last Tango in Moscow (1984, Picasso)
- Power of the Press (1986, Gas)
- Blood on the Terraces (1987, Link)
- Bombed Out (1992, Dojo)
- Sons Of Spartacus (2002, Captain Oi!/Insurgence Records)
- The Dirty Dozen (2011, I Hate People Records)
- Bullingdon Bastards (2015, Boss Tuneage/Insurgence Records)

=== Live albums ===
- Angelic Upstarts Live (September 1981, Zonophone/EMI) - No. 27 UK
- Live in Yugoslavia (1985, Picasso)
- Live & Loud (1988, Link)
- Greatest Hits Live (1991, Link)
- Live in Lubeck 1989 (1994, Bay City)
- Live from the Justice League (2001, TKO)
- Anthems Against Scum (2001, Insurgence)

=== Compilation albums ===
- Angel Dust - The Collected Highs (1983, Anagram/Cherry Red)
- Bootlegs & Rarities (1985, Dojo)
- Lost & Found (1991, Link)
- Alternative Chartbusters (1991, AOK)
- Kids on the Streets (1993, Cleopatra)
- The Independent Punk Singles Collection (1995, Cherry Red)
- Rarities (1997, Captain Oi)
- The EMI Punk Years (1999, Captain Oi)
- Who Killed Liddle (1999, Recall)
- Punk Singles Collection (2004, Captain Oi)

=== Singles ===
- "The Murder of Liddle Towers"/"Police Oppression" (1978, Dead Records, re-released on Rough Trade/Small Wonder Records, Repress)
- "I'm an Upstart"/"Leave Me Alone" (1979, Warner Bros.) - No. 31 UK
- "Teenage Warning"/"The Young Ones" (1979, Warner Bros.) - UK No. 29
- "Never 'ad Nothin'"/"Nowhere Left to Hide" (1979, Warner Bros.) - UK No. 52
- "Out of Control"/"Shotgun Solution" (1980, Warner Bros. Records) - UK No. 58
- "We Gotta Get Out of this Place"/"Unsung Heroes" (1980, Warner Bros. Records) - UK No. 65
- "Last Night Another Soldier"/"I Wish" (1980, Zonophone/EMI) - UK No. 51
- "England"/"Stick's Diary" (1981, Zonophone/EMI)
- "Kids on the Street"/"The Sun Never Shines" (1981, Zonophone/EMI) - UK No. 57
- "I Understand"/"Never Come Back" (1981, Zonophone/EMI)
- "Different Strokes"/"Different Dub" (1981, Zonophone/EMI)
- "Never Say Die"/"We Defy You" (1982, Zonophone/EMI)
- "Woman in Disguise"/"Lust for Glory" (1982, Anagram/Cherry Red) (Also released on 12" single)
- "Solidarity"/"Five Flew Over..." (1983, Anagram/Cherry Red) (Also released on 12" single)
- "Not Just a Name"/"The Leech" (1983, Anagram/Cherry Red) (Also released on 12" single?)
- "Machinegun Kelly"/"There's a Drink in It" (1984, Picasso)
- "Brighton Bomb" E.P (1985, Sparta Florida/Gas Music Ltd) (12" Single)
- "Brighton Bomb" (1987, Chameleon)
- "England's Alive" E.P. (1988, Skunx) (12" Single)
- "Angelic Upstarts/The Prowlers" (2014, Insurgence)

=== Compilation appearances ===
- Oi! The Album (EMI, 1980) - inc. "Last Night Another Soldier" & "Guns for the Afghan Rebels"
- Punk and Disorderly III - The Final Solution (Abstract, 1983) - inc. "Woman in Disguise"

=== Videography ===
- Holidays In The Sun (1997) (VHS)
- Angelic Upstarts Live: Solidarity (2005) (DVD)
