= A Child's Christmases in Wales =

2009 British TV comedy

A Child's Christmases in Wales is a one-off period comedy written by comedian Mark Watson, starring Ruth Jones, Paul Kaye, and Steve Speirs. It was shown on BBC Four in December 2009, and repeated on BBC Two. Since November 2017, it is available to watch on BritBox.

== Plot ==
An adaption of the Dylan Thomas classic, A Child's Christmas in Wales, and filmed in the small mining town of Ferndale, Rhondda Cynon Taf, Wales, has Owen Rhys reminiscing on Christmas-past (1983, 1986 and 1989). Every Christmas, Owen's uncle Huw (Steve Speirs), a successful and divorced man, his son, Maurice, and Uncle Gorwell (Paul Kaye) come to Owen's family house to stay. Through the 1980s, the boys grow into teenagers, whilst Owen's father Geraint (Mark Lewis Jones) and his uncles seem to regress into childish behaviour and sibling rivalry. Geraint and his brothers bicker and undermine each other and Owen's mother Brenda (Ruth Jones) tries to stop everything falling to pieces. Despite all the petty rows and rivalries, eventually the members of the family learn to appreciate each other and realise Christmas wouldn't be the same without each other.

== Cast ==
- Brenda Rhys (Mum) – Ruth Jones – Owen's mother, Geraint's wife, Maurice's aunt and Huw and Gorwel's sister-in-law.
- Geraint Rhys (Dad) – Mark Lewis Jones – Owen's father, Brenda's husband, Maurice's uncle and Huw and Gorwel's brother.
- Huw Rhys – Steve Speirs – Owen's uncle, Geraint and Gorwel's brother and Maurice's father.
- Gorwel Rhys – Paul Kaye – Owen and Maurice's uncle and Geraint and Huw's brother.
- Owen Rhys (aged 9 and 12) – Oliver Bunyan – Brenda and Geraint's son, Maurice's cousin and Huw and Gorwel's nephew.
  - Mark Charles Williams portrays a 15-year-old Owen
- Maurice Rhys (aged 9 and 12) – Jamie Burch – Huw's son, Owen's cousin and Brenda, Geraint and Gorwel's nephew.
  - Rhys McLellan portrays a 15-year-old Maurice
- Carol singer – Alex Beckett
- Narrator (Adult Owen) – Michael Sheen

The show was directed by Chris Gernon, and produced by Steve Doherty and Juliet Charlesworth.

== See also ==
- List of Christmas films
