= Paul Bultitude =

English musician and record producer

Paul Bultitude is an English musician and record producer. He was the drummer in power pop band Advertising, working with his cousin Dennis Smith, Tot Taylor and Simon Boswell, before replacing Seb Shelton as the drummer in Secret Affair. He was responsible for "discovering" Mari Wilson and when she achieved chart success on Tot Taylor's Compact Records label, Bultitude was the drummer in her band, the Wilsations. He was also the drummer for the short-lived power pop band, The Innocents.

== Career ==
In 1982, he formed the record label Dance Network with songwriter Paul Bevoir and together they set about crafting executed and packaged bubblegum pop, inspired by the music and merchandising of The Monkees and The Beatles.

Bultitude was the Dance Network's in-house producer, helping to shape the talents of Bevoir and his band The Jetset. He produced three of the five albums for The Jetset and worked with the label's other artists, Dee Walker, manufactured girl group The Candees, and Jetset singer Melvyn J Taub, who recorded as Melvyn and the Smartys. He also worked outside of the Dance Network, such as producing the mod band, The Moment and more recently Rinaldi Sings.

Later in his career he worked in the mainstream record industry, as an international press and promotions manager for Polydor and Jive, before forming The International Department, an international music promotion company, with Melvyn Taub and Doe Phillips.

In June 2002, Bultitude joined a reformed Secret Affair for three gigs, including a performance at London's Shepherd's Bush Empire. He was also in the line-up in June the following year, playing at The Scala in Islington to promote the release of Time For Action: The Anthology (Sanctuary), a major CD retrospective of hits, rarities and previously unreleased tracks. The concert was filmed and released on DVD.
