= Strutter (TV series) =

Television series

Strutter is a television series that was broadcast on MTV in Europe. It stars Paul Kaye as American lawyer Mike Strutter and Thaila Zucchi as his wife. The show focuses on clips of people getting hurt, Strutter making fun of music videos of indie bands, emo bands and boy bands, a German couple who like to mix extreme sports with sexual intercourse, and mock commercials promoting fictitious "Struttergear" merchandise. The show was produced by the Objective Productions comedy office, where Peep Show was made.

The character of Mike Strutter originally appeared in a Dennis Pennis video release named Dennis Pennis RIP: Too Rude to Live in which he "killed off " the Pennis character. Kaye had wanted to do something with the character for years, so he and comedy writer Paul Garner developed a format, with Garner writing the series and appearing as an actor in it. Garner has said in interviews he would sit at home watching TV making his own Strutter-style voiceovers.

The show aired two full series for a total of 16 episodes, in 2006 and 2007.

== Character ==
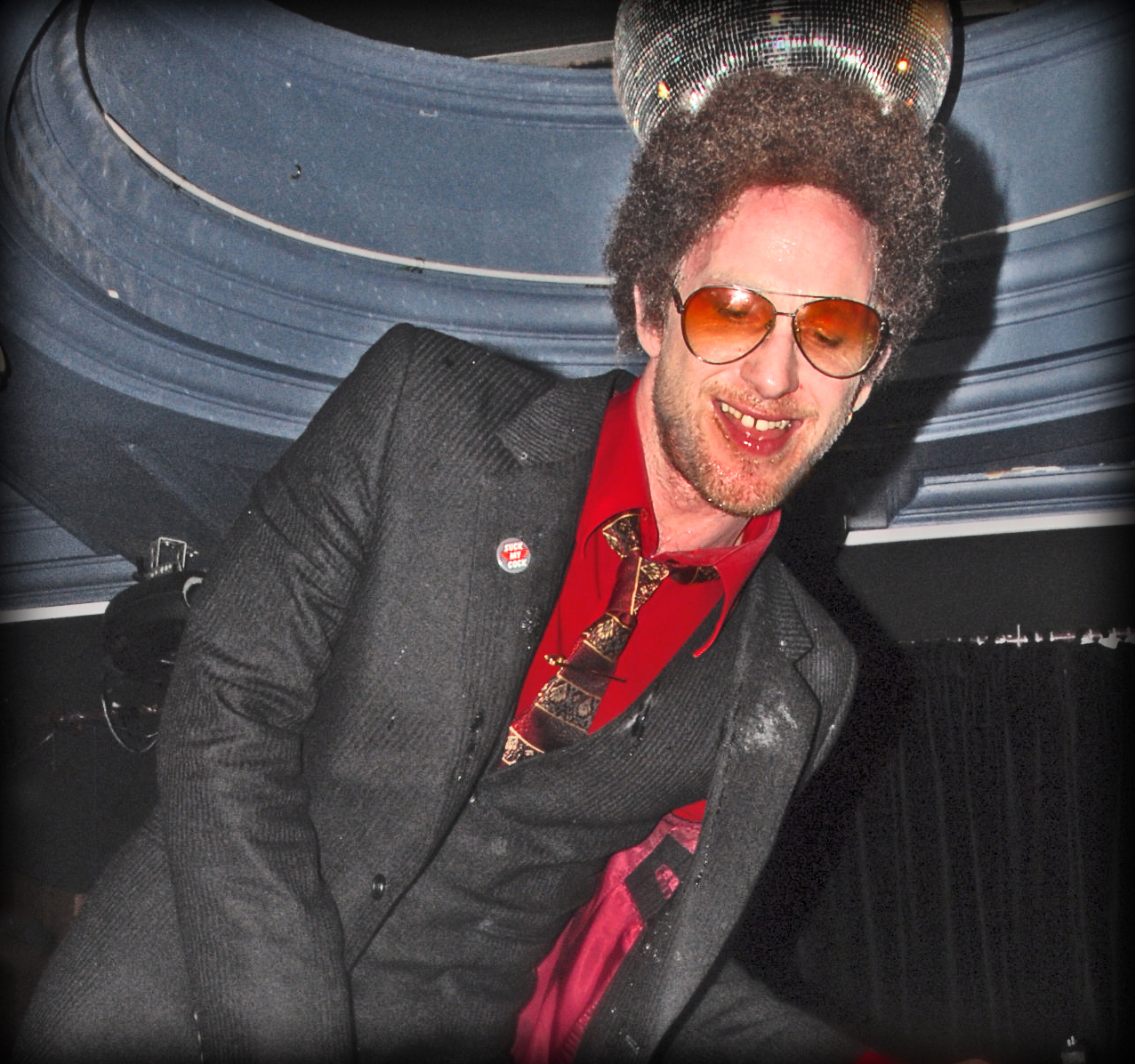
Kaye performing as Strutter in 2008

Michael "Mike" Strutter is an American lawyer who uses violence to solve his cases; he is often seen burying bodies. Strutter speaks with a Brooklyn accent, and dresses in fashion from the late 1970s. According to what can be gathered on the show, he is 41 years old, loves prostitutes, heavy metal music and seeing people get hurt, and hates indie music, emo music, Elton John, skaters and "cocksuckers". On his show, Strutter is usually high, and is usually seen snorting cocaine, smoking cigarettes and drinking alcohol. His language tends to be extremely vulgar, and he makes heavy use of the word "cocksuckers".

During the final Dennis Pennis VHS video "Pennis R.I.P.", Strutter makes his debut appearance as the lawyer for an imprisoned anti-Pennis campaigner, Tony Cream. Cream realises that Strutter will become homicidal if anyone calls him a "Nana", and thus convinces Strutter that Pennis has been gallivanting around town, calling Strutter this fairly innocuous insult. An incensed Strutter vows to murder Pennis, and we later see this happening, with Strutter throttling Pennis to death with his own microphone cord.

Kaye has suggested that the general demeanour of Strutter, his dress sense, drug addictions and foul language are based on a combination of David Kleinfeld, the lawyer played by Sean Penn in the Al Pacino film Carlito's Way, and Joe Pesci.

Kaye has performed occasional live gigs as the character, where he fronts a covers band in the guise of Strutter under the banner 'The Mike Strutter Band'. London-based singer Kiria often joins the group onstage, and can be seen dueting with Kaye/Strutter in the video for her single "Live Sex On Stage".

== Format ==
The show has its own adverts, which consist of either Strutter trying to sell his fictional merchandise , or a fictional German couple named Peter and Elkie Zpittvar (the latter being played by Lucy Montgomery), who mix sex with Extreme sports. At the end of some episodes, as the programme music begins, Strutter can be seen breaking down in tears after snorting cocaine, and making comments such as: "I'm fucked up!" or "What the fuck am I doing?, I'm forty one fuckin' years old!".

The final ident of the programme shows Strutter looking down at the camera with a cigarette in his hand and shouting at the viewer, "What the fuck are you looking at?!".

== DVD status ==
In 2011 the writer Paul Garner wrote on his official website that "It has been a constant source of frustration and incredulity to myself and Paul Kaye that MTV have never released a DVD of Series 1 & 2. Paul and I have not given up pursuing an official release and will keep you posted. Many requests have come in from fans of the show in Romania, Holland, Poland, Scandinavia, France and many other territories around the world where Strutter has been broadcast and we will endeavour to repay your support by getting something released one way or another. Keep checking back on my website for any news."

== Trivia ==
Strutter also holds the Guinness world record for "Most swear words in a TV show"

The character also appears on a track on the new album by the Fun Lovin Criminals where he mocks their recent legal battle with their former manager.
