= Kiria (musician) =

British musician

Kiria is a British singer, songwriter and guitarist, born and currently based in London Her debut album Radio was released in October 2010, by independent record label Koochie Coo Records.

== Musical style ==
Kiria plays melodic guitar pop incorporating elements of punk rock, with the singer citing original British punk groups, such as the Sex Pistols and The Clash as key inspirations. This combination of influences has led some critics to associate her music with the pop punk genre, however Kiria has made efforts to distance herself from the label, telling EGL Magazine she resents associations to "bad, cheap, manufactured record 'industry' style 'punk' pop". Instead she has adopted the tag 'Pink Punk', a phrase initially used by veteran Ritz journalist Frances Lynn to describe her music.

Other critics have commented that Radio is too diverse in its musical influences to be easily categorized, with particular reference being made to reggae track And Another Thing – and notably more aggressive, overtly punk-influenced closing track "Live Sex On Stage", on which Kiria duets with actor and comedian Paul Kaye. Kiria and Kaye have also appeared onstage together in Kaye's Mike Strutter Group, and at media events such as 2008's Loaded Lafta Awards.

== Live shows ==
At live shows, Kiria is joined by a four-piece backing band, consisting of Evil Eden on bass, Jessie May on violin, Steve Rooney on drums, and on guitar Tony Feedback – formerly of Angelic Upstarts. Performances are often theatrical, with the band sometimes appearing in fancy dress and frequently being joined by Kiria's mascot 'Jelly Baby', seen in the video for her single of the same name. Kiria has played at a diverse range of events, from the annual Warborough festival to the opening of LGBT art exhibition Loudest Whispers.

== Discography ==
=== Albums ===
- Radio (2010)

=== Singles and EPs ===
- "Live Sex On Stage" (2008)
- "Alright" (2010)
- "Jelly Baby" (2010)
