= Long Tall Shorty =

Background information
- Origin: London, England
- Genres: Mod revival
- Years active: 1978–1982; 2000–present (reformed)
- Labels: WEA; Ramkup; Acid Jazz; Detour; Biff Bang Pow; Time For Action Records
- Members: John Woodward; Jim Piddington
- Past members: Tony Perfect
- Website: Long Tall Shorty

Long Tall Shorty were a mod revival band that formed in 1978 in London. They recorded several singles before splitting up in 1982, when lead singer Tony Perfect left to join Angelic Upstarts. Reforming in 2000, they have recorded and released several albums.

== Career ==
Long Tall Shorty were one of the earliest mod revival bands, formed in August 1978 by members of the punk rock band Ben E Dorm & The Tourists. Initially called The Indicators, the line-up was: Jimmy Grant (bass), Mark Reynolds (drums) and Tony Perfect (guitar/vocals). After Keith Mono joined in October 1978, The Indicators were offered a support slot to Sham 69 at the Electric Ballroom in Camden.

After Sham 69's singer Jimmy Pursey saw Long Tall Shorty for the first time, he invited them to the Polydor Records Studio to record some demos. The tracks "1970's Boy", "Shake" and "New Generation" were recorded live at this first session in February 1979. "1970's Boy" was chosen as the first single. Pursey decided they should change the band's name to Long Tall Shorty, after a song by The Kinks, written by Don Covay and first recorded by Tommy Tucker. Over the next few months, Long Tall Shorty performed at The Wellington, and played slots with Angelic Upstarts, until June 1979 when they played on the pavement in Carnaby Street. This led to a review in the mod fanzine Maximum Speed, and offers of support slots from Back To Zero and The Teenbeats. They added a second guitarist, Stewart England.

"By Your love" was recorded in August 1979 and eventually chosen as the A side of the single. "Falling For you", "Please Can You Tell Me" and "Can't Stop moving" were recorded at Shepperton Studios, Surrey in September 1979. The idea was to have a second single ready for release, but Warner Bros. Records withdrew "By Your love" a few days after its release. In February 1980, following their first headline slot at The Marquee, the original band split up. They had been offered the support slot on The Chords' UK tour, but after the first night in Middlesbrough, they pulled out. Mark Reynolds and Jimmy Grant left and the new line-up was Keith Mono (vocals), Stewart England (guitar), Tony Perfect (bass) and Mike Morrison (drums).

During three days of summer 1980, "That's What I Want", "If I Was You", "I Do" and "All By Myself" were recorded as demos for CBS Records. Another mod fanzine, D.R.C., issued two songs on a flexi disc after the CBS negotiations broke down. The other songs surfaced on the LP The Beat Generation and the Angry Young Men. In December 1980, Mike left the band, followed by Keith the following day. Derwent joined on drums later that month. They had a monthly residency at The Marquee Club. John Kiely joined on bass and Tony Perfect switched back to guitar and vocals. "Win Or Lose"/"Ain't Done wrong" were recorded in Luton and released on Ramkup.

In August 1981, they played at the Reading Festival, accompanied by Eddie Piller, who later wrote a review in his fanzine Extraordinary Sensations of the riot that took place during the brief time they were on stage. There was another riot in Chatham and Long Tall Shorty got banned from The Marquee Club, John left the band mid-gig and Stewart left to join the Foreign Legion. Derwent Jaconelli was on drums and Mark, the roadie, joined on bass in November 1981 but two months later, Tony Perfect left, changed his name to Tony Feedback and joined Angelic Upstarts. The final Long Tall Shorty gig was at the 100 Club on 2 February 1982. 1983 Long Tall Shorty was reborn, Ian Jones on Bass and Derwent Jaconelli on Drums Tony Perfect guitar and lead vocals. 6 months later Steve Moran joined on rhythm guitar. 1984 was the release of on the Streets Again a 3 track single on vinyl. Both Ian and Derwent had a brief time playing with Angelic Upstarts and released Stepping Stone with Steve Moran. Ian and Tony went on to form Joe Public.

After the 1997 release of the 1970's Boy compilation on Captain Mod Records, Long Tall Shorty re-formed in 1999 for the Mods May Day in London. Ian had already joined Ian Page as his bass player and went on to form Ian Page and the Affair. Completely Perfect, an almost complete overview of the band's early career containing all of the tracks from the previous 1970's Boy compilation along with 11 additional tracks with Ian Jones playing bass, was released by Detour Records that same year. 2002 Tony and brother Mike on drums plus Ian Jones and Brian Hayes from The Angelic Upstarts released SHINE ON ME on Countdown Records. Tony and Ian were joined by Brian and Dave Blackman from The TeenBeats on drums releasing the album A Bird in the Hand on Acid Jazz/Countdown Records in 2002. This Town was released on a compilation CD. 2005 After another line-up change a 3-track rhythm and blues CD was released on Biff Bang Pow records. No Good Woman, Call Me, A Girl Like You, Ian Jones left the band and stayed working Ian Page and The Affair

After yet another line-up change the band then recorded a pure rhythm and blues album, No Good Women, in 2005 for Biff Bang Pow records. Several line-up changes later, Long Tall Shorty now includes: Tony Perfect (guitar/vocals), John Woodward (bass/backing vocals) and Jim Piddington (drums). They have not reverted to the mod/pop/punk of their early days, and have a new style that they call Giffer Punk. During 2009–2010, the band have toured extensively in Europe and are contracted to record for Time For Action Records in Germany. In September 2009, they release their first new LP in 4 years, "The Sound of Giffer City" which was followed by "Kick Out The Shams", both on Time For Action, in June 2010. They have also released a "download" single, Police Oppression in May 2010.

A further boost to the band came along in 2010 when the giant Universal Music Group, released a compilation LP called Mod Mania which featured the band's 1984 single, On The Streets Again. This LP reached No. 5 in the national UK Compilation LP Chart and features artists like Paul Weller, The Who and The Small Faces among others.

Shorty have been having a bit of a hiatus in 2012, re-charging their batteries and allowing them time to develop other projects. Tony has been gigging and recording with Tim V's Sham 69 and If featuring Rick Buckler from the Jam. John has been working with Garry Bushell and recording the debut Skanads ep "Skinhead Lullabies" as well as playing with Garry Bushell in The Gonads, John also plays in The Straps has toured extensively with Tim V's Sham 69, and in 2018 joined The Angelic Upstarts. Meanwhile, the boys haven't rested to long on their LTS laurels and are writing and recording a new album as yet untitled with a new musical direction. As Tony said recently in an online interview "we've been doing some of the songs for 30 years and I'm bored with them, in fact I'm bored with the ones we released only two albums ago – the only songs I'm not bored with are the ones we haven't written yet!"

On 22 February 2021, Tony Morrison (AKA Tony Feedback and Tony Perfect) died after contracting COVID-19. A memorial concert was held for Tony. Ian Jones, Derwent Jaconelli and Steve Moran reformed to play a set of Long Tall Shorty songs. The LP A Bird in the Hand was released in July 2021 printed on Red Vinyl on Countdown Records

== Discography ==
- "By Your Love" / "1970's Boy" (Single) WEA, 1979
- "Win Or Lose" (Single) Ramkup, 1981
- "On The Streets Again" (Single) Diamond Records 1984
- 1970's Boy (Album) Captain Mod 1997
- "Shine on Me" (Single) Acid Jazz 2001
- A Bird in the Hand (Album) Acid Jazz, 2002
- Completely Perfect (Album) Detour, 2002
- This Town Single Countdown 2004
- No Good Women (Album) Biff Bang Pow, 2005
- The Sounds of Giffer City (Album) Time For Action Records 2009
- "Police Oppression" (Download Single) May 2010
- Kick Out The Shams (Album) – Time For Action Records, June 2010
- Lottsappopaz (Album) - Time For Action Records, August 2018
- Take It Easy(EP) - Time For Action Records, October 2020
- A Bird in the Hand Red Vinyl Release (Album) Countdown Records, July 2022

== Compilations ==
- Soul: The Mod Revival Generation – Time For Action – Music from the TV Series
- Shake – Biff Bang Pow
- 100% British Mod – Cleopatra – 28 April 1998
- On Target – Music Club – 6 Oct 1997
- Mod Mania LP – Universal Music 2010
