= Blood on the Terraces =

Studio album by Angelic Upstarts
- Released: 1987
- Studios: London Bridge Recording Studios, Clink Street, London
- Genres: Punk rock, Oi!
- Label: Chameleon
- Producer: Angelic Upstarts

Angelic Upstarts chronology
Power of the Press (1986)	Blood on the Terraces (1987)	Bombed Out (1992)

Blood on the Terraces is Angelic Upstarts's eighth album, released in 1987.

== Track listing ==
All tracks composed by Thomas Mensforth, Brian Hayes and Ronnie Rocker; except where noted
Side A

1. "Pride of Our Passion"
2. "Everyday"
3. "I Wanna Knighthood"
4. "Heart Attack in Paris"
5. "Four Grey Walls"

Side B

1. "I Don't Wanna Fight The Soviet"
2. "Our Day Will Come"
3. "Blood on the Terraces"
4. "Heroin Is Good For You"
5. "It's Our Life"
6. "Ruby (Don't Take Your Love to Town)" (Mel Tillis)

== Personnel ==
Angelic Upstarts

- Thomas "Mensi" Mensforth - lead vocals
- Brian Hayes - guitar
- Rick "Ronnie Rocker" Newson - bass
- Martin "Max Splodge" Everest - drums

Technical

- Russell Walker - sleeve design
