= Bombed Out =

Studio album by Angelic Upstarts
- Released: 1991
- Studios: Lynx Studios, Shieldfield, Newcastle-upon-Tyne
- Genres: Punk rock, Oi!
- Label: Dojo Records
- Producer: Ray "Mond" Cowie

Angelic Upstarts chronology
Blood on the Terraces (1987)	Bombed Out (1991)	Sons of Spartacus (2002)

Bombed Out is Angelic Upstarts's ninth album, released in 1991 and featuring the return of original guitarist Ray "Mond" Cowie to the band. He also produced the album.

== Track listing ==
All tracks composed by Thomas Mensforth and Ray Cowie

Side A

1. "Red till Death"
2. "Albert's Gotta Gun"
3. "Victim of Deceit"
4. "Open Your Eyes"
5. "Still Fighting"

Side B

1. "The Writing On the Wall"
2. "A Real Rain"
3. "Let's Build a Bomb"
4. "Loud & Proud"
5. "Stone Faced Killer"

== Personnel ==
Angelic Upstarts

- Thomas "Mensi" Mensforth - vocals
- Ray "Mond" Cowie - guitar, vocals
- Dave Brewis - bass
- Graham Lant - drums
- Derek "Decca" Wade - drums on "Open Your Eyes" and "Stone Faced Killer"
- Pervie Knox - backing vocals
