= Brett "Buddy" Ascott =

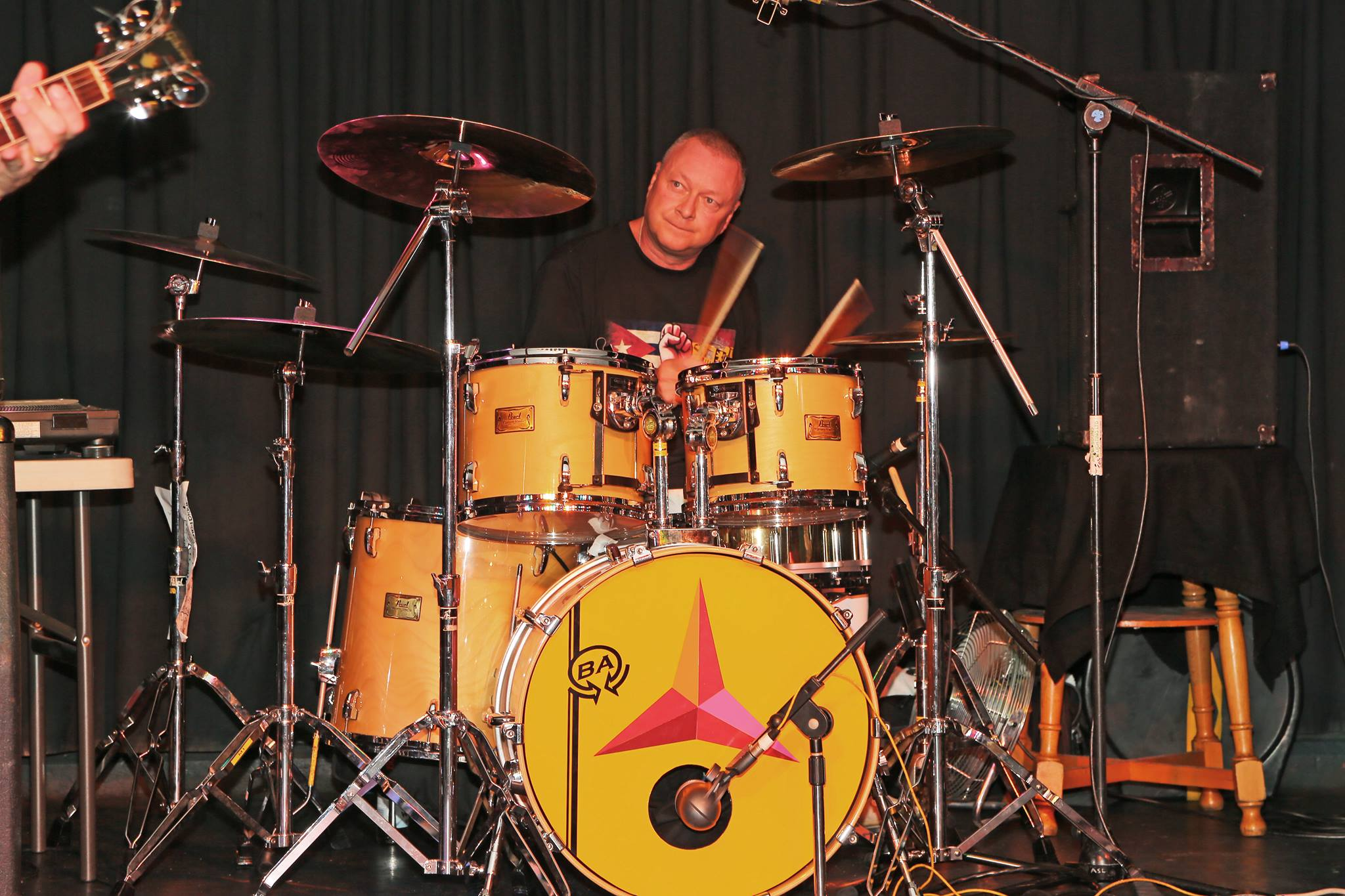
- Born: April 3, 1959 (age 67); Bromley, Kent, England
- Occupations: Drummer, Producer
- Years active: 1977 - present
- Member of The Moment, The Dear Boys
- Formerly of The Meat, The Chords, The Rage, The Way Out, Agent Orange, Red Away Tops, Pope, The Fallen Leaves, Speakeasy, The 79ers, The Dear Boys

Brett "Buddy" Ascott is a British drummer, percussionist and producer best known for his contributions to The Chords and The Fallen Leaves.

== Musical career ==
Self-taught and inspired by The Who's Keith Moon, Brett "Buddy" Ascott began his musical career playing drums with South East London punk band, The Meat at the age of eighteen in 1977. Regulars at The Roxy (from where they were eventually banned) and The Vortex, they changed their name to NADA for an ill-fated trip to Paris in the summer of 1978. Returning to London, they again changed name, to The Bombshells before Ascott left to join The Chords in January 1979. Coming to prominence as part of the Mod revival later that year, The Chords signed briefly to Jimmy Pursey's JP Records and then to Polydor. Releasing seven singles - five of which charted in the UK - the group also enjoyed a top 30 album and several television appearances including Top of the Pops. It was singer Billy Hassett who provided the "Buddy" nickname, due to his inability to play drums like one of his heroes, Buddy Rich.

After The Chords split in September 1981, Ascott continued to work with Chords' main songwriter Chris Pope as part of the group Agent Orange, later renamed Tin Soldiers. A long-term deal with Virgin Records' Ten label fell through at the last minute, and in late 1984 he began a two-year stint as drummer for The Rage, whom Sounds' Garry Bushell christened the first Mod supergroup. Ascott was selected as drummer for the "Spectrum" Mod Aid charity project in 1985, recording a Kenny Lynch-produced version of All Or Nothing with Steve Marriott, Chris Farlowe, PP Arnold and many others. It charted briefly before being pulled by the BMRB for chart-fixing. Ascott guested on The Purple Hearts' album Pop-Ish Frenzy, playing percussion.

Following a spell with indie stalwarts The Way Out, in 1987 Ascott played drums and produced a Medway group whom he had christened Edelweiss Pirates. A year later he played drums on a 12" single of theirs, produced by The Psychedelic Furs' Jon Ashton, which only saw a limited release as a white label 12 inch. Ascott again began working with Pope in the group Loaded in the late 80's. Ascott left the UK in 1992 to travel, eventually remarrying and settling in Japan, where he formed a group with former-Chords' singer Billy Hassett, Red Away Tops. An album, Satellite TV, was released as Ascott returned to the UK in late 1997. Teaming up once again with Pope, the group "Pope" - joined by Mick Talbot on keyboards for recording - released two albums in the 2000s, both to critical acclaim. He also features on half the tracks on Chris Pope's debut solo album, Peace Of Mind.

Another Mod Aid single, 2005's Whatcha Gonna Do About It, was recorded with Ron Wood, Steve Craddock and Reg Presley. This session led directly to the formation of Speakeasy, containing Mike "Ace" Evans of The Action, Fay Hallam of Makin' Time, Simon Stebbing of Purple Hearts and Mark Le Gallez of The Risk. Ian Jones of Long Tall Shorty would later take up bass duties after the death of Evans. A 2010 comeback tour with The Chords was followed by a first single in thirty years, and a first tour of Japan and Australia in 2012. In 2013 Ascott became a member of The Moment, recording a well received album and an EP. In 2014 he appeared on the TV show Never Mind The Buzzcocks.

Garage/punk group The Fallen Leaves invited Ascott to join in 2016, and he became their longest serving drummer, playing 111 shows over seven years. During that stint the group released two albums (one a live recording) and three singles. For reasons still unexplained, Ascott was ousted from The Fallen Leaves in late 2023, just before the launch of the album "Simple Songs For Complex People".

Ascott was a founding member of Mod revival tribute group The 79ers, with members of The Chords, Purple Hearts and Long Tall Shorty. They supported The Vapors on their 2021 UK tour, resulting in the release of a live album.

In 2017, as a trustee of the charity Roll Out The Barrel, Ascott and Rick Buckler led a group of 40 drummers to the top of London's O2 to play a snare drum. A bass drum skin was signed by all those involved, later augmented by other drumming celebrities, and was eventually auctioned at Bonhams, raising £1500 for the charity.

In 2019 Ascott booked London's 100 Club to celebrate his 60th birthday, and performed sets with six previous and existing groups in a charity concert. That same year Ascott collated, edited and wrote the sleeve notes for The Chords 5-CD box set, ReChordings.

In 2024 Ascott became the drummer in The Dear Boys, the recording project of writer and musician Tony Fletcher and Tony Page. They released two singles during that year, and the radio hit "Put It Down" in September 2025. An album was released in 2026. Ascott left in February 2026 following disagreements over production. Three subsequent singles and an album were released after his departure. He has also recorded with Huzzah!, featuring Gaz Evans (ex-Fallen Leaves) and Proper's singer, Ivano Bonfanti, and a single was released in 2026. Ascott continues to work with Robby Allen on his Moon Trees recording project and is a regular guest on The Who podcast, 'Talking About The Who'

As producer or co-producer, Ascott has also been involved with several groups, including The Chords, The Rage, The Fallen Leaves, and Speakeasy, as well production duties with indie rock group, Proper.

== Writing ==
Ascott has written articles for publications as diverse as the official Tottenham Hotspur Spur magazine (he is a lifelong fan), the pop culture magazine Street Sounds, and Mod magazine Design; and has also contributed to numerous books on the Mod revival and the art of drumming, including a chapter in Spike Webb's "Mad, Bad and Dangerous: The Book of drummers' Tales" and a chapter for Ian Snowball's book on The Who. He continues to work on a memoir.

== Discography ==
The Chords

Singles
Now It's Gone/Don't Go Back (Polydor, 1979)
Maybe Tomorrow/I Don't Wanna Know/Hey Girl (Polydor, 1980)
Something's Missing/This Is What They Want (Polydor, 1980)
Now It's Gone/Things We Said - free single with debut album (Polydor, 1980)
The British Way Of Life/The Way It's Got To Be (Polydor, 1980)
In My Street/I'll Keep On Holding On (Polydor, 1980)
One More Minute/Who's Killing Who (Polydor, 1981)
Turn Away Again/Turn Away Again (Again) (Polydor, 1981)
Another Thing Coming/Now It's Gone (live)/One More Minute (live) (Aspop, 2010)

Album
So Far Away (Polydor, 1980)

Live albums
No One Is Listening Anymore - Live At The Rainbow (Unicorn, 1986)
It Was Twenty Years Ago Today (Detour, 2012)

Compilations
This Is What They Want (2 CDs) (Polydor, 2000)
At The BBC (Detour, 2001)
The Mod Singles Collection (Captain Mod, 2008)
ReChordings (5-CD boxset) (Caroline, 2019)

The Rage

Single
Looking For You/Come On Now (Diamond, 1986)

Compilation
All* (2 CDs) (Detour, 2018)

Spectrum/Mod Aid

Singles
All Or Nothing (Phoenix, 1985)
What'cha Gonna Do About It (Biff Bang Pow, 2005)

The Way Out

Compilation
Singles & Demos (Way Out, 2019)

Red Away Tops

Album
Satellite TV (Lost Chord Productions, 1998)

Pope

Singles
Brave New World (Aspop, 2005)
Friends Like That (Aspop, 2006)
Could I Fall In Love Again (Aspop, 2007)
Love's Still Here (Aspop, 2009)
Get Into London Town (Aspop, 2010)
Don't You Ever (Download) (E-pop, 2010)

Albums
Grace Of God (Aspop, 2005)
Tall Tales & Cheap Thrills (Aspop, 2009)

Chris Pope

Singles
Peace Of Mind (E-pop, 2014)
All Aboard The Promised Land (E-pop, 2014)

Album
Peace Of Mind (E-pop, 2014)

Speakeasy

Single
Candy/Last Summer In London (F.A.B., 2023)

EP
The Toe Rag Sessions (Biff Bang Pow, 2006)

Albums
Speakeasy (Paisley, 2012)
Trouble (Twist, 2013)
Lost Souls (Heavy Soul, 2017)

The Moment

EP
Know It All (Infenzo, 2016)

Album
The Only Truth Is Music (Infenzo, 2015)

The Fallen Leaves

Singles
Begin Again (Parliament, 2019)
Green Eyes F.C. (Parliament, 2019)
Rosalina/Stay (Spinout Nuggets, 2023)

Albums
Maximum Minimum (Live at the Hope & Anchor) (Parliament, 2019)
Simple Songs For Complex People (Parliament, 2024)

The 79ers

Live album
Live! Live! Live! (Detour, 2022)

The Dear Boys

Singles
(They Say) Don't Waste Your Vote (Download, 2024)
Gone Viral/Scan Me (Dear Records, 2024)
Put It Down (7",12" and Chris Coco mixes - CD single) (Dear Records, 2025)
I Hope You Know How Fucking Cool You Are (Download cassette Single) (Dear Records 2026)
Procrastination (Download) ( Dear Records 2026)
Join The Queue (Download)(Dear Records 2026)

Album
The Dear Boys Can't Say No (Dear Records 2026)

Proper
Album
Meant To Say Something (Spinout Nuggets, 2025) (Production, percussion)

Huzzah
Single
Only One Way (Spinout Nuggets, 2026)
