= Chris Hunt =

British journalist, magazine editor, and author

- Born: 1962 or 1963 (age 62–63); United Kingdom
- Occupations: Journalist; magazine editor; author
- Website: chrishunt.biz

Chris Hunt is a British journalist, magazine editor, and author.

Hunt has worked in journalism for over thirty years, most often writing about football or rock music. He was editor of Match from 1993 to 2001, a period that saw the weekly title become Britain's biggest selling football magazine. Between 2001 and 2006 he was the editor of a series of special editions of UK music magazines, Mojo, Q, Uncut and New Musical Express, producing themed publications on subjects such as The Beatles, U2, Kurt Cobain, Oasis, punk rock and mod. He was the editor of the series of three special editions of Mojo magazine that told the story of The Beatles one thousands days at a time; the three magazines were eventually published as the book The Beatles: 10 Years That Shook The World, by Dorling Kindersley, in 2004.

His book, World Cup Stories: The History Of The FIFA World Cup, was published in April 2006 to accompany a BBC television series of the same name. The book was updated in November 2006 and published in a Greek language edition in 2010. His second book about the tournament, The Compact Book Of The World Cup, was published in 2010 in both the UK and North America (in the USA it was titled World Cup Of Soccer: The Complete Guide).

The first edition of his football encyclopedia The Complete Book Of Football was published in 2003 and the second edition has been issued in foreign language editions, including Hungarian, German, Russian, Romanian and Czech. It has also been published in the USA as The Complete Book Of Soccer.

His most recent book is Escape From Holland, telling the true story of the last British boat to evacuate Holland as the Germans invaded in May 1940. It was published in 2026.

Between 1988 and 1990 he was the original editor of rap magazine Hip-Hop Connection, a magazine he returned to in 1992. Other national magazines that he has launched include Rage, Solid Rock and sports magazines Mega Sports and Sported. In 2016, he became editor of Elite Soccer, the coaching magazine of the League Managers Association, and in 2017 he launched Match Football Krazy, a monthly companion magazine of Match.

He has also worked in TV and radio, working for BBC Radio 5 show The Mix in the early 1990s. Along with colleague David Houghton, he filmed a video diary of his travels around Japan at the 2002 World Cup for the BBC and this formed part of the television programme "Beckham For Breakfast".

He has been a regular football columnist for Ice, Sport First and Football First. In 2002 he wrote a monthly column for Your Cat magazine, called "My Life With Stalin - An Everyday Tale Of One Bloke And His Cat". He has also been asked to write CD and DVD sleevenotes for many bands, including The Charlatans, Secret Affair, Corduroy, Purple Hearts and The Chords. He has also written the liner notes for a compilation of easy listening cover versions of songs by The Beatles.

He started his career in the early 1980s, publishing a fanzine called Shadows & Reflections and he has been involved in band management, most notably with The Moment and Rinaldi Sings.

== Selected works ==
- The Compact Book Of The World Cup (Hayden Media, 2010) 1st UK Edition ISBN 978-0-9564976-0-4
- World Cup Of Soccer (Firefly Books, 2010) 1st US Edition ISBN 978-1-55407-606-2
- World Cup Stories: The History Of The FIFA World Cup (Interact, 2006) 1st Edition ISBN 0-9549819-2-8
- World Cup Stories: The History Of The World Cup (Interact, 2006) Updated 2nd Edition ISBN 0-9549819-6-0
- The Beatles: 10 Years That Shook The World (Editor) (Dorling Kindersley, 2004) ISBN 1-4053-0691-2 (UK); ISBN 0-7566-0670-5 (US)
- The Complete Book Of Soccer (Firefly Books, 2006) 2nd Edition (US) ISBN 978-1-55407-161-6
- The Complete Book Of Football (Hayden Publishing, 2003) 1st Edition ISBN 978-1-903635-16-2
- Escape From Holland (Mile Away Publishing, 2026) 1st Edition ISBN 978-1-91927-1-828
