= Reason Why? =

Studio album by Angelic Upstarts
- Released: May 1983
- Studios: Alaska Studios, Waterloo, London
- Genres: Punk rock, Oi!
- Label: Anagram
- Producer: Ray "Mond" Cowie

Angelic Upstarts chronology
Still from the Heart (1982)	Reason Why? (1983)	Last Tango in Moscow (1984)

Reason Why? is Angelic Upstarts's fifth album, released in 1983. Trouser Press called it "the Upstarts’ great leap forward, a blend of angry socio-political lyrics with a controlled and melodic rock attack. A surprisingly good record for all rock tastes."

"Woman in Disguise" and "Solidarity" were released as singles, the former an attack on Margaret Thatcher, and the latter a tribute to the Polish trade union.

== Track listing ==
All lyrics written by Thomas Mensforth. All music composed by Ray Cowie; except where noted.

Side A

1. "Woman in Disguise"
2. "Never Give Up" (Mensforth, Cowie, Paul Thompson)
3. "Waiting, Hating"
4. "Reason Why" (Mensforth, Cowie, Paul Thompson)
5. "Nobody Was Saved"
6. "Geordies Wife" (Mensforth)
7. "Loneliness of the Long Distance Runner"

Side B

1. "42nd Street" (Mensforth, Tony Morrison)
2. "The Burglar" (Mensforth, Brian Hayes)
3. "Solidarity"
4. "As The Passion" (Mensforth, Brian Hayes)
5. "A Young Punk" (Mensforth, Brian Hayes)
6. "Where We Started"

== Personnel ==
Angelic Upstarts

- Mensi - vocals
- Mond - guitar, vocals
- Brian Hayes - guitar
- Tony "Feedback" Morrison - bass

with:

- Paul Thompso - guest drummer
- Peter Lambert - drums on "The Burglar" and "Where We Started"
- Robbie Garrette - keyboards
- Simon Lloyd - saxophone
- Kenny Mountain, Terry Sharpe, Terry Wilson-Slesser - backing vocals

Technical

- Iain O'Higgins - engineer
- Jim Phelan - artwork
