= Shalva Kiria =

Soviet military officer (1912–1988)

Shalva Nestoris dze Kiria
- Born: 10 January 1912; Tsayshi, Georgia, then Russian Empire
- Died: 17 July 1988 (aged 76); Zugdidi, Georgian SSR
- Military career
- Allegiance: Soviet Union
- Branch: Soviet Air Force
- Service years: 1927 – 1988
- Rank: Major general
- Units: Cavalry; 37th short-range bomber aviation regiment 427th Night Fighter Squadron Aviation Regiment; 151st Guards Fighter Aviation Regiment
- Commands: 195th Guards Fighter Aviation Division; 145th Fighter Aviation Division
- Conflicts: World War II; Battle of Kursk; Belgorod–Kharkov operation; Battle of the Dnieper; Kirovograd offensive; Battle of Korsun–Cherkassy; Uman–Botoșani offensive; Second Jassy–Kishinev offensive; Battle of Debrecen; Siege of Budapest; Vienna offensive
- Awards: Hero of the Soviet Union

Shalva Nestoris dze Kiria (Georgian: შალვა ნესტორის ძე კირია, Russian: Шалва Несторович Кирия, Shalva Nestorovich Kiriya; 10 January 1912 – 17 July 1988) was a Soviet fighter ace who fought in World War II.

== Early life ==
Shalva Kiria was born in the village of Tsayshi, Georgia, when it was part of the Russian Empire. He finished school after the 6th grade and entered army service in 1927. Kiria went on to visit military schools in Azerbaijan and Russia, to enter service as cavalry commander in Ukraine. In 1935 he graduated from the Orenburg Higher Military Aviation School for Pilots and became navigator of bomber regiments in Siberia and the Far East.

== World War II ==
When Nazi Germany invaded, Kiria was a squadron commander of the 37th Short-Range Bomber Aviation Regiment. On 27 August 1941 during defensive operations, his Tupolev SB was shot down by enemy fighter aircraft but he managed to bail out with a parachute. In early 1942, Kiria began retraining to become a fighter pilot himself and graduated in May 1943 from the then Lipetsk Advanced Training Courses for Air Force Command Personnel. From May to December of the same year, he served in leadership roles of the 151st Guards Fighter Aviation Regiment and fought on three separate fronts, as well as in a number of major battles that include Kursk, Dnieper, Budapest and Vienna. In that period, he was wounded twice. Kiria flew a total of 25 combat sorties in SB bombers, as well as 225 in Yak-1, Yak-7 and Yak-9 fighter aircraft. In 64 air battles, he personally downed 27, according to other sources 29 enemy aircraft and shared two more victories. For his efforts, he was awarded the title Hero of the Soviet Union.

== Post war ==
Following the war, Shalva Kiria continued military service as deputy commander of fighter regiments and divisions. In 1951 he graduated from the Advanced Training Courses for Command Personnel and became commander of the 119th Fighter Aviation Division. In March 1958 he took command over the 145th Fighter Aviation Division and from 1961 onwards, Major general Kiria served in reserve capacity. He lived in the city of Odessa until he returned to Georgia in 1970. Shalva Kiria died on July 17, 1988 in Zugdidi, Georgia. A street in Zugdidi is named after him.
