= Paul Bonin =

English singer and guitarist

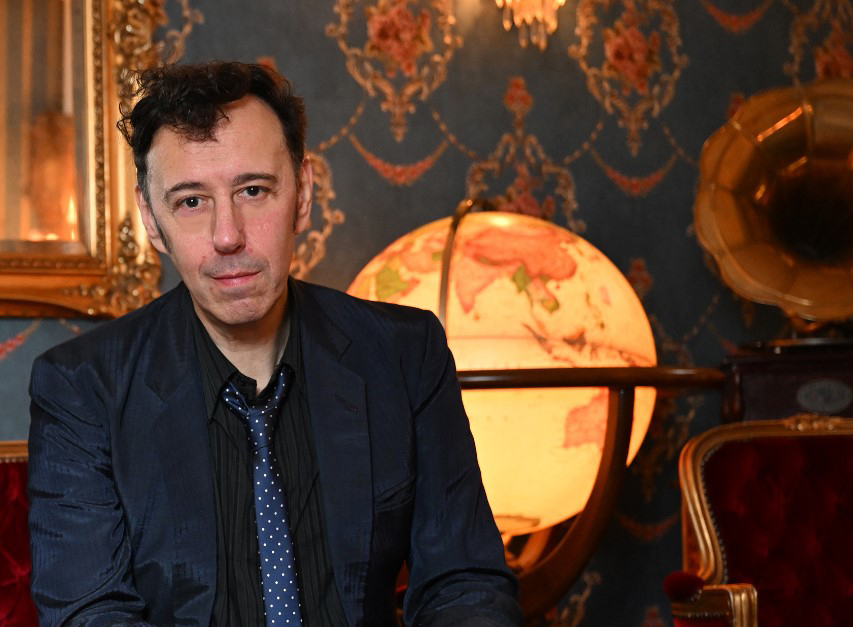
- Paul Bonin in 2023

Background information
- Origin: London, England
- Genres: Rock, Folk
- Occupation: singer-songwriter
- Years active: 1979–current
- Website: Official website

Paul Bonin is a singer and musician (electric bass, guitar) and a songwriter/composer. His body of published recorded work spans from 1980 to the present day.

== Biography ==
=== Early life (1979–1986) ===
Bonin was born in Hammersmith, London and grew up in north London. He began playing bass in north London punk band "The Shit", the only band to play at the National Union of Students rally in Hyde Park in front of a crowd of 5000 in March 1979. Bonin played bass in The Jetset, recording and touring with the band from 1980 to 1982.

=== As a musician (1986–2010) ===
After moving to Berlin in 1986, he founded the street-punk band "The Magoo Brothers". Before their demise in 1989, the band had toured all over Europe, playing over 400 concerts in the process. They released the album, Beyond Believable, in 1988 on the German Bouncing Corporation label and published by Constrictor.

Bonin followed this by forays into the newly independent Eastern European states, playing to a TV audience of 250 million at the Jurmala Festival in Riga, Latvia in 1992, as well as at the Ukrainian national Festival Maria later that year. Bonin also supported Marc Almond at the Sopot Festival in 1993.

He was offered a place at the Liverpool Institute for Performing Arts (LIPA) in 1996. This was also the year he began a 15-year performing career on stage at the Deutsche Oper (German National Opera) in Berlin, taking on a variety of roles including M. Guillot in Tschaikovsky's Eugene Onegin.

Record releases followed throughout the late 1990s with his band "King Bastard" which featured Tex Morton on guitar. Their song "Time on my Hands" was featured in Leander Haußmann's film of Sven Regener's novel "Herr Lehmann". Bonin teamed up with Regener in 2001, singing backing vocals on the Element of Crime album Romantik. Bonin has continued to write, many of his songs appearing in films and television. He signed to Universal in 2004 as a songwriter in his own right.

During a period arranging and co-producing with Moses Schneider (Beatsteaks, Tocotronic), and writing with Christian Geller (Banaroo, No Angels), Vanessa Petruo and Apocalyptica, Bonin also found time to tour and write with Ben Hamilton and The Say Highs, playing supports for The Sea and Cake, Jack Peñate and Kula Shaker, among others.

=== Later career (2010–present) ===
He has continued to play live and record since then; as of 2010, he was preparing his new bands, The Chosen Few, and The Wildfires for action.

The Wildfires released their debut album One on Amazing Records (Europe) at the end of 2013, produced by David Young. They are currently residing in Berlin and touring throughout Europe.

Bonin's career branched out into the field of acting in May 2016 when he took on the role of 'Wally' in Volker Schlöndorff's filming of Return to Montauk. The film was released in May 2017.

Bonin's mastery of the German language also became evident with the publication of his English translation of the autobiography of Edgar Froese which was published in September 2017.

== Discography ==
=== Music and/or words (outtakes) ===
- "At School" Magoo Brothers (Sanft u. Mutig compilation)
- "Beyond Believable"- Magoo Brothers (Bouncing (Pastel)/Constrictor) – album
- "The Equestrian" by Paul Bevoir, Dumb Angel album (Polystar)
- "Summer in the Rain" – Paul Bonin (FNAC compilation)
- "A Million Places", King Bastard (EMI – Big Noize compilation)
- "Moonman Underground", King Bastard (Virgin Fetensause compilation)
- "A Million Places", King Bastard (Edel); "Gute Zeiten Schlechte Zeiten" compilation
- "Romantik", Element of Crime (Motor); vocal tracks for album
- "Time on my Hands"/"Fly" – King Bastard (Rabazco/BMG single)
- "Sensational" (single by Martin Kesici) Bravo Hits compilation (Polystar)
- Nitro 17 (BFS album)
- Blood Runs Cold, Soul Doctor (Metal Heaven album)
- Back to the Bone, Soul Doctor (Metal Heaven album)
- The Wildfires "One" (Amazing Records Europe)

=== Film and television outtakes ===
- "Apocalypso Calypso" – ARD Germany
- "America" – ARD Germany
- "After the Fire" – Russian State TV
- "Somewhere" – Russian State TV
- "Miracle" – Ukrainian State TV
- "To Be Someone" – Ukrainian State TV
- "Rembrandt" – Ukrainian State TV
- "Summer in the Rain" – public Polish TV (Sopot Festival)
- "Million Places" – Millennium Crash (film), ARD Germany
- "Strawberry Parade" – Millennium Crash (film), ARD Germany
- "Time on my Hands" – Herr Lehmann (film), Boje Buck Films Germany
- "Sensational", Starsearch 2, SAT1 Germany
- Paul Bonin songsearch at the GEMA (German Performing Rights Society)
- Paul Bonin and the Chosen Few (live on German national TV)
