= Red Alert (band) =

English punk/Oi! band

- Origin: Sunderland, England
- Genres: Punk rock, Oi!
- Years active: 1979–present
- Labels: No Future; Nightmare Records; Captain Oi!
- Members: Mick Jones; Dave Jones; Axel Klempin
- Past members: Steve 'Cast Iron' Smith; Paul 'Dona' McDonough; Tony Van Frater; Gary 'Mitch' Mitchell; Les 'Nobby' Cobb; Matty Forster; Gaz Stoker; Tom Spencer; John Forster; Andrew 'Lainey' Laing; Ian Syborn

Red Alert are аn English punk/oi!-band, formed in Sunderland, England, in May 1979. The group released five EPs and a studio album, and appeared on numerous compilations, including Punk And Disorderly (Abstract Records, 1981) and Carry On Oi! (Secret Records, 1981). Three of the band's releases reached the Top 30 in the UK Indie Chart. Red Alert broke up in 1984, reformed five years later and continued touring and recording.

== Band history ==
Red Alert's original line-up — Steve 'Cast Iron' Smith (vocals), Tony Van Frater (guitar), Gaz Stuart (bass) and Dona (drums) — debuted in the summer of 1979, at a carnival in Sunderland, performing mostly Clash and UK Subs covers.

Their first demo became their debut release: a self-financed four track EP Third And Final, only 250 copies of which were pressed and then sold at gigs. With the new drummer Gary 'Mitch' Mitchell the band produced its second demo In Britain and recorded two tracks for the Carry On Oi! compilation, only one of which -"SPG"- was included. Gary Bushell suggested that the band should send their material to No Future Records which they did and were signed a week later.

In the course of two years Red Alert released two 7-inch EPs (In Britain, Take No Prisoners), their debut LP We've Got The Power, a single ("City Invasion") and a 6 track 12-inch EP (There's A Guitar Burning), all with new drummer Les 'Nobby' Cobb. Matty Forster replaced Cobb in 1984. This change bore little fruit: disillusioned and weary, the band called it quits; the band's last gig was a benefit for the miners' strike. For some time Tony and Matty toured with Red London.

In 1989, all four original members of Red Alert started meeting again, at a new Kazbah club, opened in Sunderland. In early 1990 the reformed band did a gig with Red London and Attila the Stockbroker and, inspired by their warm reception, decided to go on — with the exception of Gaz, who was replaced by Tom Spencer.

After touring Western Europe alongside Red London, the quartet (with Gaz Stoker of Red London, as a new bassist) recorded their second LP Blood, Sweat 'N' Beers, released on Nightmare Records in Germany. Beyond The Cut (Nightmare/Knockout) followed in 1993.

With new drummer John Forster (Matty's brother) and later Lainey of Leatherface the band toured the United States and released the Super Yobs album, a split with The Templars. On return they released the "Street Survivors"/"Drinkin' With Red Alert" double 7-inch EP set.

In August 1994, new drummer Ian Syborn joined; with him in 1995-96 the band recorded Breakin' All The Rules CD for Dojo Records. Shortly after the release Lainey returned, this time as bassist. This line-up recorded Wearside, released by PlasticHead Records to coincide with the 1999 Red Alert - The Rarities compilation (20 previously unreleased tracks) on Captain Oi! Records.

Red Alert's latest studio album Excess All Areas was released in 2005.

== Line up ==
The band's current lineup includes:

- Guitar- Mick Jones
- Bass- Dave Jones
- Drums- Axel Klempin

Ian Syborn died in 2002. Tony Van Frater died on 29 October 2015. Steve "Cast Iron" Smith died in Spain on 30 November 2022.

== Discography ==
=== Singles and EPs ===
- Third and Final EP (Guardian Records) 1980 [reissued as Border Guards EP (Combat Rock Records) 1994)]
- In Britain EP (No Future Records) 1982
- Take No Prisoners EP (No Future Records) 1982
- "City Invasion"/"Negative Reaction" (No Future Records) 1983
- There’s a Guitar Burning EP (No Future Records) 1983
- We've Got the Power EP Live In Mondreagon (Capita Swing Records) 1992
- "Drinkin' with Red Alert" / "Street Survivors" (EP, Nightmare Records / Knockout Records) 1994
- "Visca El Barça" (Plastic Disk Records) 1996
- “Double Aye/Eh Side”
- Split EP w/Rough Cuts (Cursed Blessings Records) 2021

=== Albums ===
- We’ve Got the Power (No Future Records LP, CD) 1983
- Blood, Sweat 'N' Beers (Nightmare Records LP, CD 1992
- Beyond the Cut (Nightmare Records / Knockout Records) 1993
- Super Yobs (split with The Templars) (Vulture Records) 1994
- Breakin' All the Rules (Dojo Records CD) 1996
- Wearside (Plastic Head Records CD) 1999
- Excess All Areas (Captain Oi!, 2005)

=== Compilation albums ===
- Red Alert: Oi Singles Collection (Captain Oi! Records CD) 1995
- Rebels in Society (Get Back Records CD) 1997
- The Rarities (Captain Oi! Records CD) 1999
- Best Of (Captain Oi! Records CD) 2000
- Border Guards (Harry May, 2001)
- Blazin' Thru The Years - The Best Of (2005)

=== Compilation appearances ===
- Punk and Disorderly (Abstract Records) 1981
- Carry On Oi! (Secret Records) 1981
- Angels With Dirty Faces (No Future Records) 1984
- There Is No Future.. (No Future Records) 1984
- Maggie, Maggie, Maggie; Out! Out! Out! (Anagram Records) 1987
- Kids on the Street (Bird Records) 1993
- The Bright Side Of Oi (Street Kids Records) 1994
- LA Compilation (Combat Rock Records) 1995
- Knock Out in the 1st Round (Knockout Records) 1996
- Oi! The Rarities Vol 1 (Captain Oi! Records) 1995
- No Future Punk Singles Collection Vol 1 (Captain Oi! Records) 1995
- No Future Punk Singles Collection Vol 2 (Captain Oi! Records) 1996
- Oi! Against Racism (Havin' A Laugh Records) 1996
- War is Insanity (Knockout / Banda Bonnot Records) 1996
- On the Streets (We Bite Records) 1997
- We Are the Firm (Cockney Rejects tribute) (1,2,3,4 Records) 1998
- We Are the People (Angelic Upstarts tribute) (Knockout Records) 1998
- Voice of a New Generation (Blitz tribute) (Plastichead Records) 1999
