= Kirian =

Kirian may refer to:

- 22134 Kirian, a named minor planet
- Kirian Ledesma (born 1984), Spanish footballer
- Kirian Rodríguez (born 1996), Spanish footballer
