= Red London =

UK punk music band

- Origin: Sunderland, England
- Genres: Punk rock
- Years active: 1981–2002, 2018–present
- Members: Patty Smith, Gaz Stoker, John Forster, Marty Jackson, Scott Dixon

Red London is an English punk band formed in Sunderland in December 1981, influenced by The Clash, Chelsea, SLF, The Angelic Upstarts, The Ruts and The Jam. The band named themselves after a Sham 69 song.

The band was formed by guitarist Kid Stoker, soon joined by brother Gaz Stoker on bass (from fellow Sunderland punk band The Rebels, other members of which went on to form Red Alert), as well as vocalist Patty Smith and drummer Raish Carter. In 1982 they signed to Razor Records, and their first release was 1983's Sten Guns in Sunderland EP, followed by the This is England LP in 1984, which received a 5/5 review in Sounds.

The band began touring Europe from 1985. Having been replaced on drums for the band's debut album, Raish Carter returned on vocals replacing Patty Smith for third release, 1987 EP Pride and Passion, on French label Gougnaf Mouvement. Another French label, Negative, released second album Outlaws in 1989, by which time Marty Clark had taken over vocals. A series of releases followed in the 1990s for various labels both in the UK and abroad.

The band reunited in 2018 and played their first gig at the Museum Vaults in Sunderland. A brand new album, Back On The Streets, was released on CD and vinyl in 2024 through Mad Butcher records.

As of 2023 the lineup consists of "The Icon" Patty Smith on vocals, Gaz Stoker on Bass, John Forster on Drums and Marty Jackson and Scott Dixon on Guitars and backing vocals.

Since reforming in 2018 they have released 4 Albums as of 2026.
