= Kirya =

Kirya may refer to:

== Places ==
- HaKirya ("The Kirya"), area in central Tel Aviv
  - Kirya Tower a skyscraper adjacent to (but not in) The Kirya
- Kirya (Mwanga), a ward within Mwanga District, Kilimanjaro in Tanzania
- Kirya, Russia, village in Alatyrsky District, Chuvash Republic, Russia, hometown of cosmonaut Nikolai Budarin

== Surname ==
- George Kirya (born 1939), Ugandan politician and diplomat
- Maurice Kirya (born 1982), Ugandan musician
- Saba Saba (born Alex Kirya, 1977), Ugandan hip hop artist

== Other uses ==
- Kirya (album), a 1992 album by Ofra Haza
- Kirya language, dialect of Kirya-Konzəl language Chadic language of Nigeria
