= Paul Kaye =

English actor and comedian

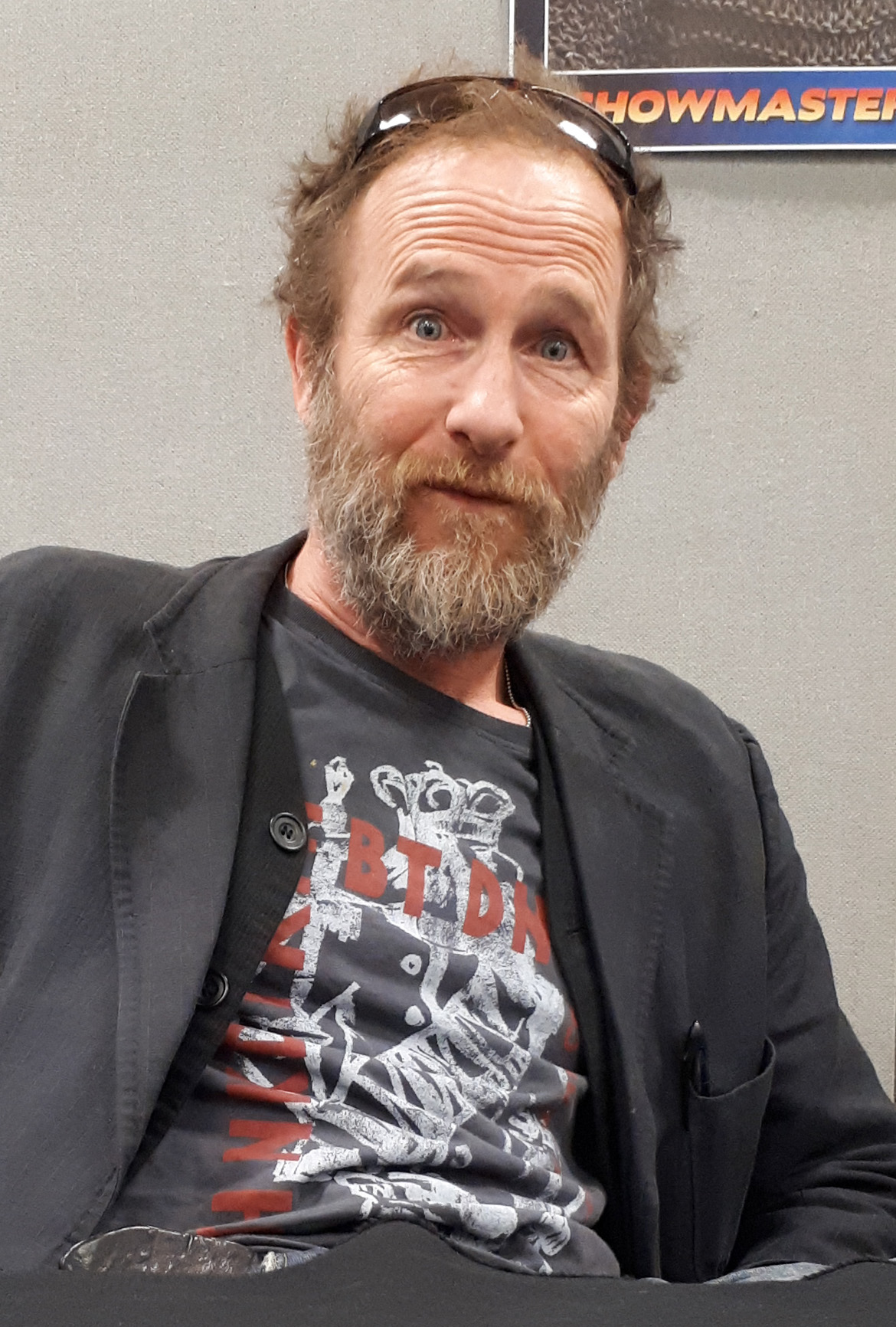
- Kaye in 2018
- Born: Clapham, London, England
- Occupations: Comedian; actor
- Spouse: Orly Katz (m. 1989)
- Children: 2

Paul Kaye is an English comedian and actor. He is perhaps best known for his role as Thoros of Myr in the HBO fantasy series Game of Thrones (2013–17). He started as shock interviewer Dennis Pennis on The Sunday Show (1995–97). His other TV roles include Mike Strutter in the MTV series Strutter (2006–2007), Vince the fox in the BBC black comedy series Mongrels (2010–2011), Vinculus in the BBC fantasy mini-series Jonathan Strange & Mr Norrell (2015), Psychiatrist in the Netflix comedy series After Life (2019–20), Malcolm Donahue in the ITV crime drama Vera (2019–23), and Patrick Katz in the Netflix thriller mini-series The Stranger (2020).

In theatre, Kaye was nominated for the 2012 Laurence Olivier Award for Best Performance in a Supporting Role in a Musical, for his work as Mr. Wormwood in the Royal Shakespeare Company's musical Matilda.

== Early life and education ==
Paul Kaye was born in the Clapham area of London. He and his twin sister were adopted by Jackie and Ivan Kaye and raised in Wembley, where their adoptive parents ran a sportswear shop. He is of Jewish background.

He was a promising schoolboy athlete who achieved an impressive time in the 100-metre race. He later became a fan of punk rock, particularly the Sex Pistols bassist Sid Vicious. At the age of 16, he entered Harrow Art School on a two-year foundation course, and achieved a distinction before earning a first-class degree in theatre design from Trent Polytechnic (now Nottingham Trent University).

== Career ==
=== Early career ===
On graduation, Kaye designed theatre posters for the King's Head Theatre, the Bush Theatre, and the Gate Theatre, Notting Hill. He was a scene painter at the Old Vic Theatre in Waterloo and illustrated regularly for the NME, i-D, Literary Review, Time Out and International Musician magazines between 1987 and 1989. He had two exhibitions of illustration and poster work between 1989 and 1990, firstly at the Soho House Theatre, and then at The Drill Hall.

Kaye formed and sang in many bands, including the dark psychedelic outfit We Are Pleb, who played extensively in Camden during 1988–89 (at the same time as Blur and Suede) and had a penchant for setting the stage on fire. Kaye was signed to Go Discs in 1992 with a group called TV Eye (formed with ex-members of the band Eat), which released two singles, "Killer Fly" and "Eradicator".

In 1993, Kaye filmed a prototype Dennis Pennis, interviewing his own band on a late-night indie music show on Granada TV called Transmission. After the interview, Kaye then went out with the crew, got very drunk and offended as many people as possible in Oxford Street. This tape somehow arrived on the desk of producers at Planet 24 six months later, and they offered Kaye the job of knocking on people's doors at 6.00am on The Big Breakfast. Kaye turned them down, preferring to stay on Jobseeker's Allowance and stick with We Are Pleb; Mark Lamarr eventually took the job.

Kaye was a graphic designer for Tottenham Hotspur. He had an office in White Hart Lane and designed in-house merchandise for Spurs, Derby County, Southampton and Aston Villa for Danish sportswear brand Hummel International (doing caricatures of Paul Gascoigne for school lunchboxes etc.). As an Arsenal fan, Kaye has said there are subliminal cannons contained within his work for Spurs, including a pen and ink drawing of Tottenham's new stand on a catalogue cover which features a minute cannon in the crowd: 70,000 were printed. Kaye became in-house theatre designer of the Bet Zvi Drama Academy in Tel Aviv for 12 months in 1994, designing all the in-house productions in their studio theatre.

His TV debut was on The Word being secretly filmed in Oliver Reed's dressing room. Kaye recalls "Reed had drunk two bottles of vodka, taken all his clothes off and I honestly thought he was going to kill me on live television. I swore in bed that I'd never do a celebrity interview again. Typically, six months later I'd come up with Dennis Pennis."

In 1994, Kaye convinced his old friend Anthony Hines (a car mechanic and some time roadie for TV Eye) to help him write Dennis Pennis when he was offered the job on The Sunday Show. (Hines was later poached by Sacha Baron Cohen to write for Ali G on The Eleven O'Clock Show and went on to receive an Oscar nomination for co-writing Borat in 2006).

=== Dennis Pennis ===
Celebrity interviewer Dennis Pennis, created by Kaye and Hines, was one of Kaye's earliest characters. With dyed red hair, gaudy jackets adorned with punk-style badges, and thick glasses, Pennis stood out from the crowd and asked celebrities atypical questions, ranging from playful to cruel. After brief stints presenting two episodes of Transmission (ITV's early 1990s indie music magazine show) as Pennis, the character next appeared in 1995 on BBC2's The Sunday Show.

Originally, the celebrities would be mainly British stars harassed at assorted London-based events, such as actor Hugh Grant, TV host Ulrika Jonsson, and sports pundit Des Lynam. A late night half-hour one-off special aired on 15 September 1995 on BBC2 called Anyone For Pennis?, which contained previously unseen footage that couldn't be shown on The Sunday Show due to the show's pre-watershed slot at lunchtime. When the Pennis character took off, Kaye was afforded a budget large enough to travel to Cannes, Hollywood, and Venice to record footage for a two-part special on 9 and 16 August 1996 on BBC2 called Very Important Pennis. His victims from this point on were more renowned, the most famous of whom were Arnold Schwarzenegger, Demi Moore, Kevin Costner, Morgan Freeman and Bruce Willis, amid a raft of other Hollywood A-list stars.

Pennis was visibly amused at the look of disgust on some of the stars' faces. There was some controversy when Pennis asked of Steve Martin, "How come you're not funny any more?" Although it was claimed that Martin subsequently cancelled all scheduled press interviews, in 2024 he denied doing so. Kaye later said that he regretted this interview for a while, but nevertheless said, "Anyone who thinks they can improve on Bilko and Inspector Clouseau needs a slap, don't they?"

A special one hour video-only feature was released in 1997 called Dennis Pennis RIP: Too Rude to Live, which saw the character killed off, after Kaye decided the rewards were not worth the effort. However, Pennis did appear in public one last time in June 1997 on the main stage at Glastonbury introducing the headliners that night The Prodigy – the band had been a fan of Pennis's character and had requested him personally. Kaye, as his Pennis character, conducted the 60,000+ crowd in a sing-song during a power cut during the band's set that evening.

=== Acting career ===
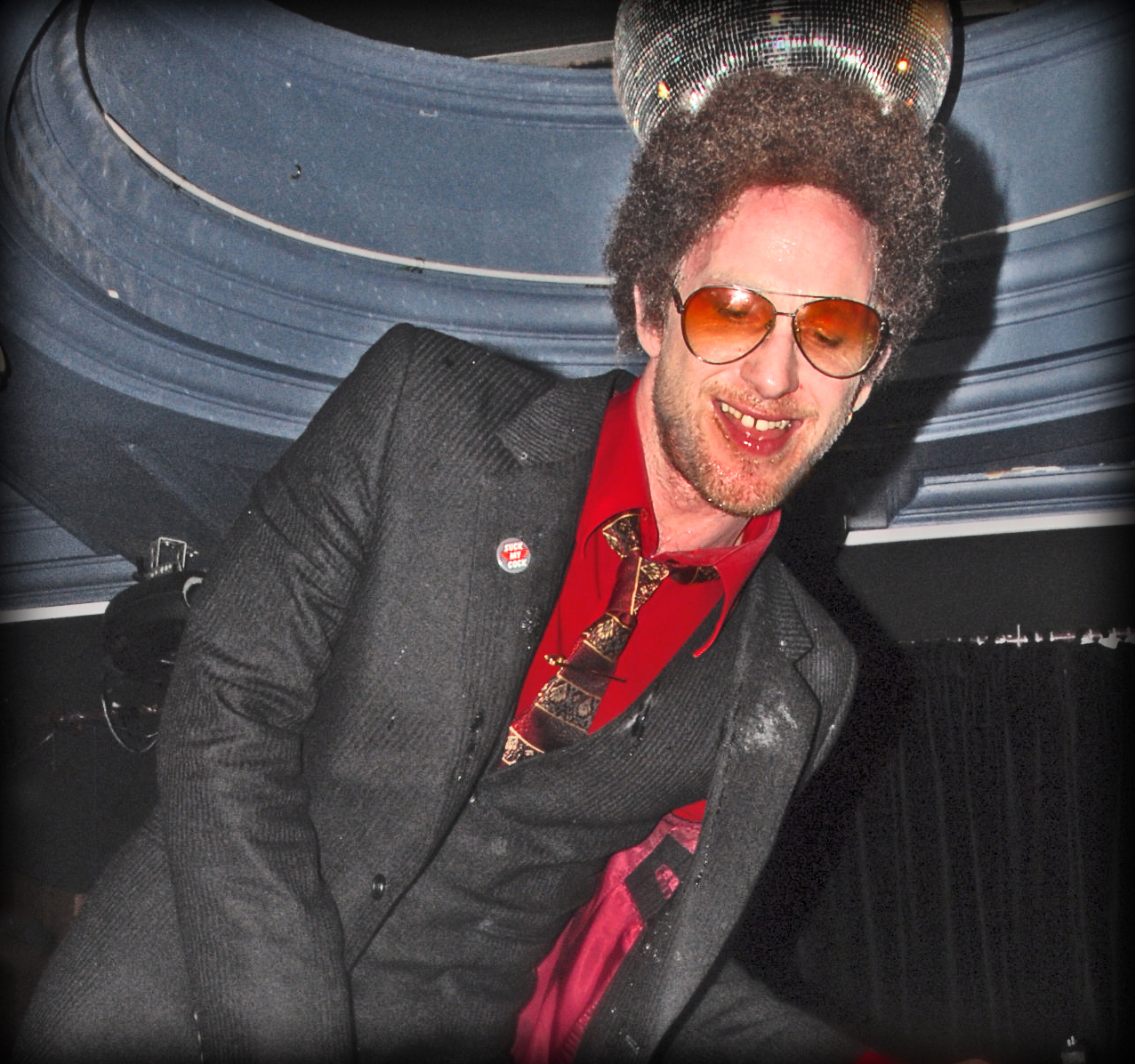
Kaye as Mike Strutter in 2008

In 1998, Kaye appeared in the video to the Fat Les song "Vindaloo" as a Richard Ashcroft look-alike. That same year, he also appeared as the character DI Lindsay De Paul in the TV comedy movie You Are Here.

Kaye also appeared as the singer of a fictional punk band called Spunk in a 1999 mock-documentary of the same name, which appeared as the 'wrath' part of a Channel 4 series on the seven deadly sins.

In 2000, Kaye starred in the comedy series Perfect World, a sitcom about a down-on-his-luck marketing manager. He also briefly presented a BBC2 quiz show, Liar, in which six contestants would all have a supposed claim to fame and the studio audience voted on which one they believed was telling the truth. In the same year, Kaye took a dramatic role alongside Michelle Collins in Two Thousand Acres of Sky.

In 2004, Kaye played the leading role in the film Blackball. His role as deaf DJ Frankie Wilde in the 2005 mockumentary It's All Gone Pete Tong won him the Film Discovery Jury Award at the 2005 US Comedy Arts Festival. He played in two episodes of the BBC drama series Waking the Dead, playing Dr. David Carney in "Shadowplay". Television appearances in 2006 and 2007 included episodes of Hustle, EastEnders and Kingdom. Kaye was the chief interviewer on rockworld.tv, in which he interviewed up-and-coming punk and indie bands.

Kaye appeared in Hotel Babylon (11 March 2008, BBC One), Pulling (Series 2, March 2008, BBC Three), and as Uncle Gorwel in A Child's Christmases in Wales by Mark Watson (17 December 2009, BBC Four and 24 December 2009, BBC One Wales).

From November 2010 to January 2011, Kaye played Matilda's father Mr. Wormwood in the Royal Shakespeare Company's musical Matilda, based on the classic Roald Dahl novel of the same name. Kaye reprised the role when the musical transferred to the Cambridge Theatre in London's West End in October 2011. In April 2012, Kaye was nominated for the Laurence Olivier Award for Best Performance in a Supporting Role in a Musical.

In 2012, he appeared as a character called Maurice in UK TV adverts for the rebranding for the digital era of betting website BetVictor, to launch their new BetVictor app.

In 2013, Kaye appeared as Thoros of Myr in the third season of the HBO series Game of Thrones, and as Danno in the BBC Radio 4 series Love in Recovery. In 2016, he reprised his role as Thoros of Myr in the sixth season of Game of Thrones, and returned for the seventh season.

In 2014, Kaye played Brother Lucian in the movie Dracula Untold. In 2015 he played a criminal in the BBC drama The Interceptor.

In 2015, he featured as the drunken, haunted Naval Officer Harry Brewer in the National Theatre's revival of Our Country's Good. He also appeared in Doctor Who as an alien funeral director. That same year, He played Vinculus in Susanna Clarke's Jonathan Strange & Mr Norrell.

Kaye's other television credits include The Trial of Elizabeth Gadge, an episode of Reece Shearsmith and Steve Pemberton's anthology series Inside No. 9, Netflix's first original TV series Lilyhammer, the BAFTA winning Murder in Successville, BBC miniseries Three Girls, Sky comedy Zapped, Drunk History, The Windsors, Urban Myths, Terry Pratchett: Back in Black, and the adaptation of Terry Pratchett and Neil Gaiman's Good Omens.

In 2017, Kaye appeared onstage as Chilean bomb maker Jose Miguel in B, a new play by Guillermo Calderón at the Royal Court Theatre. He appears as Dr. Malcolm Donahue, the pathologist in ITV's Vera until 2023. Kaye has appeared as Danno, who is a recovering alcoholic attending Alcoholic Anonymous (AA) meetings in Pete Jackson's BBC Radio 4 comedy drama series Love in Recovery. In 2019, Kaye debuted as hospital chaplain Daniel Booth in the ITV dramedy Cold Feet, and played a psychiatrist in the Netflix comedy series After Life.

In 2020, he appeared in the Netflix drama The Stranger, as Patrick Katz, and portrayed "The Cowboy" in the HBO miniseries The Third Day. In 2021, he played Guy Forks in a Bonfire Night special of Mackenzie Crook's re-working of Worzel Gummidge for the BBC. In 2023, Kaye starred in The Pillowman, staged at the Duke of York's Theatre, London.

== Personal life ==
In 1983, Kaye took a year out of university and lived on Israel's Gvar'am kibbutz, where he met an Israeli woman, Orly Katz. They were married in 1989. They have two sons and, as of 2009, lived in the Hendon area of London.

In January 2009, Kaye wrote an article for The Guardian in which he called for peace between Israel and the Palestinians after his mother-in-law was killed by a Hamas rocket strike on the Gvar'am kibbutz.

In March 2019, Kaye gave a reading at the funeral of The Prodigy frontman Keith Flint.

== Filmography ==
=== Film ===
Year	Title	Role
1999	The Comedy Trail: A Shaggy Dog Story	Bob Slay
2003	Blackball	Cliff
2004	It's All Gone Pete Tong	Frankie Wilde
2004	Agent Cody Banks 2: Destination London	Neville Trubshaw
2005	Short Order	Cable Show Guy
2005	Match Point	Estate Agent
2007	WΔZ	Gelb
2008	Cass	Arsenal Thug
2009	Malice in Wonderland	Caterpillar
2010	The Big I Am	Keys
2011	Anuvahood	Tony
2012	Pusher	Fitz
2013	Blackwood	Father Patrick
2013	The Whale	Matthew Joy
2014	Dracula Untold	Brother Lucian
2015	Pan	Mutti Voosht
2016	Tomorrow	Milo
2016	The Comedian's Guide to Survival	Philip
2018	Anna and the Apocalypse	Arthur Savage
2021	The Toll	Cliff
2022	Catherine Called Birdy	Sir John Henry Murgaw VIII (“Shaggy Beard”)
2023	The Offering	Heimish
2023	Nandor Fodor and the Talking Mongoose	Maurice
2024	Seize Them!	King Ivarr
2024	That Christmas	Farmer Yirrell (voice)
2025	The Woman in Cabin 10	Danny Tyler

=== Television ===
Year	Tile	Character	Notes
1999	Spaced	Hoover	1 episode
2000–2001	Citizen Kaye	Various Roles	Sketch Show
2000–2001	Perfect World	Bob Slay	
2001–2003	Two Thousand Acres of Sky	Kenny Marsh	
2004	Waking the Dead	Dr. David Carney	Episode: "Shadowplay"
2005	Down to Earth	Gavin	Series 5, Episode 6: "Broken Dreams"
2006	Hustle	Tim Millen	Series 3, Episode 5
2006	The Sittaford Mystery	Dr. Ambrose Burt	A Miss Marple series (Agatha Christie)
2006–2007	Strutter	Mike Strutter	
2007	EastEnders	Douglas	1 episode
2007–2008	Chop Socky Chooks	Dr. Wasabi (voice)	
2007–2009	Kingdom	Alan McEwan	3 episodes
2008	Comedy Live Presents	Mike Strutter	Channel 4 One-off
2008	Massive	Manny Westside	Episode: "Recording the Single"
2008	Hotel Babylon	Maxwell	1 episode
2008–2009	Pulling	Billy	4 episodes
2009	39 i Pół	Kelly Moran	
2009	A Child's Christmases in Wales	Uncle Gorwel	Television film
2009	Midsomer Murders	Laurence Mann	Episode: "The Great and the Good"
2010	Skins	Duncan	Episode: "Cook"
2010	Inspector George Gently	Max Osgood	Episode: "Gently Evil"
2010–2011	Mongrels	Vince (voice)	
2011	Candy Cabs	Dennis Whitehead	3 episodes
2011	Shameless	Kermit	1 episode
2011	Being Human	Vincent	Episode: "Lia"
2013	Stella	Peschman Hodd	4 episodes
2013–2017	Game of Thrones	Thoros of Myr	10 episodes
2013	Not Going Out	Steve	Episode: "Magic"
2013–2014	Lilyhammer	Duncan Hammer	4 episodes
2013	Ripper Street	Gabriel Cain	1 episode
2014	Friday Night Dinner	Rabbi	
2014	Jonathan Strange & Mr Norrell	Vinculus	
2015	The Interceptor	Jago	2 episodes
2015	Humans	Silas Capek	2 episodes
2015	SunTrap	Freddie Mercury	1 episode
2015	Chewing Gum	Seb	1 episode
2015	Inside No. 9	Richard Two-Shoes	1 episode: "The Trial of Elizabeth Gadge"
2015	Doctor Who	Prentis	2 episodes: "Under the Lake", "Before the Flood"
2016	Murder In Successville	Louis Walsh	Episode: "Head, Shoulders, Knees & Toes"
2016–2018	Zapped	Howel	Episodes: "Mr Weaver", "Mr Charisma" & "Mr Wuffles" (Season 1)
2017	Three Girls	Jim Winshaw	
2017	Terry Pratchett: Back in Black	Sir Terry Pratchett	
2018	The Windsors	Tramp Catcher	Royal Wedding Special
2018	Wanderlust	Lawrence	
2018	Dark Heart	Jim Duggan	2 episodes (5&6)
2019	Cold Feet	Reverend Daniel Booth	Series 8, episodes 4 and 5
2019–2023	Vera	Dr. Malcolm Donahue	Series 9-12
2019	Good Omens	Electricity Board Spokesperson	1 episode: "Saturday Morning Funtime"
2019–2020	After Life	Psychiatrist	Series 1-2, 12 episodes
2019	Year of the Rabbit	Detective Inspector Tanner	Main cast, 6 episodes
2020	The Stranger	Patrick Katz	8 episodes
2020	The Third Day	The Cowboy	3 episodes + 1 special
2020	The Watch	Inigo Skimmer	5 episodes
2021	Worzel Gummidge	Guy Forks	1 episode
2021	Beforeigners	John Roberts	4 episodes
2022	The House	Cosmos	TV special
2022	Mood	Kevin	Main cast
2022	Pennyworth	Francis	5 episodes
2024	Shardlake	Brother Jerome	4 episodes
2026	Small Prophets	Roy	6 episodes

=== Mobile and internet videos ===
- Fight the English way

=== Video games ===
Year	Title	Role	Notes
1996	You Don't Know Jack	Jack Cake (voice)	UK edition only
2004	The Getaway: Black Monday	Levi Statov (voice)	
2022	The Dark Pictures Anthology: The Devil in Me	Charles Lonnit (voice)	

== Awards ==
Kaye has been nominated for a number of film awards:

- Best Actor – US Comedy Arts Festival (Won) (It's All Gone Pete Tong)
- Best Actor – Method Fest (Nominated) (It's All Gone Pete Tong)
- Best Performance by an Actor in a Leading Role – Genie Awards (Nominated) (It's All Gone Pete Tong)

He has been nominated for two major theatre awards:

- Best Supporting Actor in a Musical – WhatsOnStage Awards (Nominated) (Matilda the Musical)
- Best Performance in a Supporting Role in a Musical – Olivier Awards (Nominated) (Matilda the Musical)
