= Soldier (Harvey Andrews song) =

Song written and recorded by Harvey Andrews

Single by Harvey Andrews

from the album Writer of Songs
- A-side: "In the Darkness"
- Written: 1972
- Released: May 26, 1972
- Genre: Folk
- Label: Cube
- Songwriter: Harvey Andrews
- Producer: John Worth

Soldier is a song written and recorded by Harvey Andrews in 1972. It was released as the B-side of the single "In the Darkness", and later featured on the album Writer of Songs.

An event inspired the song in Belfast, Northern Ireland. In 1971, Sergeant Michael Willetts of 3 PARA cleared a room in Springfield Road RUC Police Station of civilians because the Provisional IRA had planted a bomb with a short burning fuse. After the room had been cleared, an Inspector who helped local people flee then slammed the door to the room which contained the bomb, but realizing the door was not strong enough to absorb the blast, he pressed his body against the door, shielding the people on the other side. The charge exploded, and he was seriously injured.

Sgt Willetts, whose post was actually down a hall, heard the screams; instead of saving himself, he choose to run toward the bomb after shouting orders to another soldier to evacuate upstairs. He was left with a man and woman with their two children. He pushed them into a corner and stood between them and the bomb. A chunk of metal from a locker was blasted into the back of his head, and he died on the operating table two hours later.

As his and other bodies were carried out Irish Republican supporters clapped, jeered, and sang rebel songs to the disbelief of other soldiers and police.

The incident so struck Harvey Andrews that he wrote the song to highlight the senselessness of violence and to make the point that soldiers, too, are human, and that Sgt Willetts had laid down his life for people who considered British soldiers to be nothing more than "murderers". (The incident of the soldier embracing the bomb was poetic licence.) Broadcasts of Andrews' record were banned for some time by the BBC lest feelings be exacerbated in the nationalist community of Northern Ireland, or the British public be incited to attack innocent Irish people. The Ministry of Defence advised British soldiers not to sing the song in pubs where it may incite strong emotive behaviour. Some have interpreted this as a ban.

Harvey Andrews' authorship is not always widely known, and many incorrect stories about the song's origin circulate. Harvey Andrews intended the song to transcend sectarianism, but some have wrongly interpreted it as glorifying military heroism.

The song's merits were debated in Folk Review. It was criticised by Leon Rosselson for "catastrophic naivety", and Dick Gaughan compared it unfavourably to Andrews's song "Hey! Sandy".

Sales of the record "In the Darkness" / "Soldier" could not keep up with demand in Northern Ireland. A record shop on Shankhill Road in Belfast broadcast the song by loudspeaker, and subsequently sold 5000 copies.

Harvey Andrews has voiced some regrets over the song's legacy for the Troubles:

It seems that it was taken to be a pro-Loyalist song, which was never my intention. Years later it was released as a bootleg single by a Loyalist band and I have been told it was sold in pubs and out of car boots at the Glasgow Rangers ground to raise money for paramilitaries. I was strongly opposed to this but was powerless to stop it. A song I had originally intended to once again mirror man's inhumanity to man has somehow become a vehicle for more of the same, something I regret.
