= Harvey Andrews =

English singer-songwriter and poet

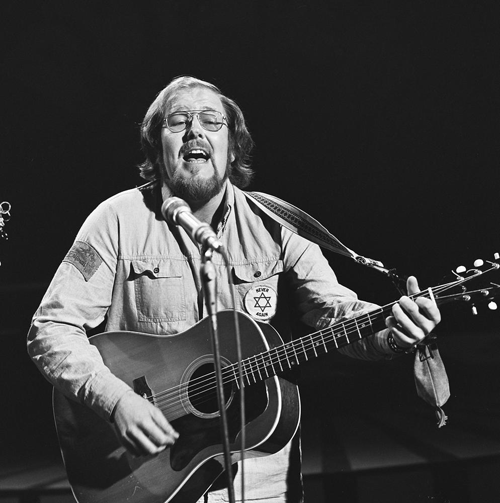
Harvey Andrews in the Dutch television program Popzien, 8 June 1973

Harvey John Andrews (born 7 May 1943 in Stechford, Birmingham) is an English singer-songwriter and poet. Andrews has produced 16 albums singing his own songs, many of which have also been recorded by other artists.

Andrews began his career in 1964 and became a full-time musician in 1966. He is known for his collaboration on the musical Go Play Up Your Own End, which has been well-received in the Midlands, and his musical memoir, "Gold Star to the Ozarks." Andrews retired from full-time concert performances in 2012. Throughout his career, he has appeared at numerous festivals, on television shows, and hosted radio programs. He is the father of author Scott K. Andrews and was voted International Artiste of the Year in the 1996 Canadian Porcupine Awards for folk music.

== Career ==
From 1964, Andrews supported his nascent career as a singer-songwriter by working as a schoolteacher, before becoming a full-time professional musician in 1966.

He collaborated on a successful musical depicting life growing up in Birmingham in the 1940s and 1950s. Go Play Up Your Own End has been well received across the Midlands, especially in its production in 2006 featuring Jasper Carrot in a major role, but has yet to make the transfer to London. The musical has played at the Birmingham Repertory Theatre, the Birmingham Hippodrome and the Alexandra Theatre, thus setting a record of having been staged at every one of the second city's major theatres.

In 2007, he published a musical memoir, "Gold Star to the Ozarks". Harvey retired from full-time concert performances in October 2012 with a series of concerts at The Guild Hall, Lichfield.

== Appearances ==
He has appeared at many festivals around the world. Television appearances include the Old Grey Whistle Test, Rhythm on Two and over 50 other shows. He has made two television specials featuring his songs, The Camera and The Song, and The Same Old Smile. Two further specials were produced in the Netherlands and Ireland. He sang "Riding Free", the theme song from the cult British horror movie Psychomania in 1973, and wrote and sang the theme songs for two Australian TV series, Golden Pennies (1985) and The Haunted School (1986). He has hosted BBC Radio Two's Folk on Two and a Radio Four Kaleidoscope special was devoted to his work.

== Personal life ==
He is father of the author Scott K. Andrews.

== Awards ==
In 1996, he was voted International Artiste of the Year in the Canadian Porcupine Awards for folk music.

== Discography ==
- "Harvey Andrews EP" (Transatlantic 1966)
- Faces and Places (Decca 1970)
- Writer of Songs (Cube 1972)
  - among the tracks are: "Hey! Sandy" (also "Hey Sandy"), written about Sandra Scheuer In addition "Soldier" a song deriving from the "Troubles" and operation "Banner" in Northern Ireland.
- Friends of Mine (Cube 1973)
- Fantasies From a Corner Seat, with Graham Cooper (Transatlantic 1975)
- Someday (Transatlantic 1976)
- Margarita (Beeswing 1980)
- Brand New Day (Polydor 1980)
- Old Mother Earth (Beeswing 1986)
- PG (Beeswing 1988)
- 25 Years On the Road (Hypertension 1989)
- Spring Again (Hypertension/Ariola 1994)
- Snaps – The Family Album (Hypertension 1996)
- The Gift (Hypertension 2001)
- The Journey (Hypertension 2003)
- Somewhere in the Stars (Hypertension 2005)
- Resigning from Today. Transatlantic compilation (Sanctuary 2007)
- Encore (Haska Music 2013)
- Life (Haska Music 2014)
- Soldier (Written 1972)

Harvey Andrews was referenced (presumably with his consent) by Les Barker's Mrs Ackroyd Band on the album Tubular Dogs, in the song "The Harvey Andrews Chorus", using the music of Handel's "Hallelujah Chorus".
