= The Chords (British band) =

British pop music group

- Origin: South East London
- Genres: Mod revival, power pop
- Years active: 1978–1981, 2010
- Label: Polydor
- Members: Billy Hassett (1978–80); Chris Pope; Martin Mason; Brett "Buddy" Ascott; Kip Herring (1981)
- Website: thechords.co.uk

The Chords are a 1970s British pop music group, commonly associated with the 1970s mod revival, who had several hits in their homeland, before the decline of the trend brought about their break-up. They were one of the more successful groups to emerge during the revival, and they re-formed with the four original members for a UK tour during 2010.

== Career ==
The Chords, a South East London group, formed in 1978 when singer/guitarist Billy Hassett and his bassist cousin, Martin Mason, advertised for musicians in the NME and found guitarist and songwriter, Chris Pope. Original drummer Paul Halpin did not stay long, at least behind his drum kit, and eventually became the group's tour manager. In his place came Brett "Buddy" Ascott, and by March 1979 The Chords were taking the stage. They gigged continuously over the spring and summer, headlining two mod festivals at London's Marquee Club and recording their first BBC Radio 1 session for DJ John Peel in early July. They also featured, along with some of their fans, on the cover of Time Out magazine. Amongst their early supporters were Paul Weller, who saw one of their first concerts, and Sham 69's Jimmy Pursey, who signed the group to his JP Productions company.

The quartet recorded a handful of demos for Pursey, before the relationship soured after he instigated a stage invasion during The Undertones set at a concert where the Chords were the opening act. Polydor then signed the band to a recording contract. For their debut single, the Chords chose one of the songs recorded for Pursey, "Now It's Gone", re-recorded it and had it released in September 1979. It rose to No. 63 in the UK Singles Chart.

They followed it up in January 1980 with "Maybe Tomorrow", which, bolstered by rave reviews in the press, shot in to the UK Top 40. A second Peel session was recorded in March, and the next month their third single, "Something's Missing", arrived. This taster for their debut album, So Far Away, reached No. 55. The album made No. 30 in the UK Albums Chart in May, bolstered by a UK tour. The album included two cover versions; Sam & Dave's "Hold On, I'm Comin'" and The Beatles' "She Said She Said". AllMusic gave So Far Away 4.5 stars, the second highest rating possible.

"The British Way of Life" single arrived in July and reached No. 54, and "In My Street", released in October, topped out at No. 50. The group continued touring, until a show at London's Music Machine in November 1980. The Chords sacked Hassett, and the former Vibrators' singer Kip Herring stepped in. The new line-up was featured on the cover of their next single, "One More Minute", which arrived in May 1981. It was a flop, as was August's "Turn Away Again", and the Chords called it a day the following month.

In 1986, a live album entitled No One's Listening Anymore was issued, which was recorded in 1980. A decade later, the double album compilation CD, This Is What They Want was released.

In August 2010, The Chords went back on the road with their original line-up, promoting the single, "Another Thing Coming", and playing gigs across the UK. They also toured Australia and Japan in 2012. A DVD, What Became of the People We Used To Be - The History of The Chords was available from May 2012, charting the band's rise to cult status.

In 2019 Universal/Caroline released a 5 CD box set entitled ReChordings, with a 36 page booklet notated by Brett "Buddy" Ascott. The collection comprised So Far Away, a singles compilation, Live At The Rainbow, and 2 CDs of previously unreleased material.

== Discography ==
=== Singles ===
- "Now It's Gone" (1979) – UK No. 63
- "Maybe Tomorrow" (1980) – UK No. 40
- "Things We Said" (1980) - UK
- "Something's Missing" (1980) – UK No. 55
- "The British Way of Life" (1980) – UK No. 54
- "In My Street" (1980) – UK No. 50
- "One More Minute" b/w "Who's Killing Who" (1981)
- "Turn Away Again" (1981)
- "Another Thing Coming" (2010)

=== Albums ===
- So Far Away (1980) – UK No. 30

== See also ==
- List of Peel sessions
