= Glory Boys =

Studio album by Secret Affair
- Released: 23 November 1979
- Recorded: 1979
- Genre: Mod revival
- Length: 37:06
- Label: I-Spy
- Producer: Ian Page; David Cairns

Secret Affair chronology
Glory Boys (1979)	Behind Closed Doors (1980)

Singles from Glory Boys
- 1. "Time for Action" Released: 17 August 1979; 2. "Let Your Heart Dance" Released: 26 October 1979

Professional ratings
Review scores
Source	Rating
AllMusic	4.5/5 stars
Record Mirror	4/5 stars

Glory Boys is the debut album by mod revival band Secret Affair, released in November 1979 by their label I-Spy, which they founded after signing to Arista Records. The album peaked at number 41 on the UK Albums Chart.

== Background and release ==
After the demise of their previous band New Hearts, Ian Page and David Cairns formed Secret Affair, inspired by the 1960s mod movement. Page said he "started off calling this mod thing ‘Glory Boys’ which took away all the idea of it being a revival, but we lost that battle". He'd invented the Glory Boys concept, as a "reaction to being told that I wasn’t any good and if I am going to be honest the real idea was like a spiv; a black shirt and white tie, clothes being very important." This image was inspired by Page and Cairn's fascination with the 1970 crime drama film Performance, with its main characters having a "very modish look".

The band's first single, "Time for Action", was their highest charting single, peaking at number 13 on the UK Singles Chart, and is a retort against the punk elite. The follow-up single, "Let Your Heart Dance" was also successful, peaking at number 32 on the chart.

The album was released in the US and Canada by Sire Records on 30 June 1980, with a different sleeve and remixes of some of the tracks. The album also included "My World", which was released in the UK on the band's second album Behind Closed Doors. Page explained that "Sire believed that American ears were different from English ears and wanted different mixes. They booked me a highly experienced US engineer and he made some very subtle differences".

The album was released on CD in 2001 by Captain Mod Records, which included as bonus tracks, the two B-sides to the singles. In December 2019, for the 40th anniversary of the album, Glory Boys was reissued on vinyl as a limited 750 copies.

== Reception ==
Reviewing the album for Record Mirror, Mike Nicholls wrote "No matter how trivial this year's revival may seem, don't let it cloud your judgement of a fine modern pop album." "As individual tunes they work out fine: mobile, uncluttered and presumably most essentially, good to dance to. The lyrics aren't bad either – sharp, concise, unpretentious and an all-round reflection of Page's personality and present pre-occupations. Musically, there's muscle to spare, if nothing very original."

Cashbox wrote "The inventive foursome has the energy that only the best representatives of the new wave have had, yet it is startlingly commercial." "The lyrics are clever, the hooks immediately memorable, and Secret Affair should gain immediate AOR acceptance." However, Billboard wrote "the sound and looks of this English mod quintet is derivative of the 1960s, but the heart of the music lacks that era's spontaneity. The polish makes these rockers boring and unimaginative, and the lyrics are trite. But clean, balanced instrumentation strengthens the collection, thanks to efficient production."

== Track listing ==
All tracks are written by Ian Page and David Cairns, except where noted.

Side one
No.	Title	Writer(s)	Length
1.	"Glory Boys"		3:30
2.	"Shake and Shout"		3:38
3.	"Going to a Go-Go"	William "Smokey" Robinson, Warren "Pete" Moore, Bobby Rogers, Marvin Tarplin	3:08
4.	"Time for Action"	Cairns	2:43
5.	"New Dance"		4:35

Side two
No.	Title	Length
6.	"Days of Change"	3:08
7.	"Don't Look Down"	2:39
8.	"One Way World"	3:47
9.	"Let Your Heart Dance"	2:58
10.	"I'm Not Free (But I'm Cheap)"	7:00
Total length:		37:06

2001 CD bonus tracks
No.	Title	Writer(s)	Length
11.	"Soho Strut"	Page	3:39
12.	"Sorry, Wrong Number"		5:21

=== US and Canada release ===
Side one
No.	Title	Writer(s)	Length
1.	"Glory Boys"		4:28
2.	"Shake and Shout"		3:31
3.	"Going to a Go-Go"	Robinson, Moore, Rogers, Tarplin	3:03
4.	"Time for Action"	Cairns	2:43
5.	"New Dance"		4:40

Side two
No.	Title	Writer(s)	Length
6.	"My World"	Cairns	3:37
7.	"Days of Change"		3:29
8.	"Don't Look Down"		2:41
9.	"One Way World"		3:19
10.	"Let Your Heart Dance"		2:58
11.	"I'm Not Free (But I'm Cheap)"		7:11
Total length:			41:40

== Personnel ==
Musicians

- Ian Page – lead vocals, trumpets, piano, Hammond organ, assorted keyboards
- David Cairns – backing vocals, Fender Telecaster 6-string electric guitar, Rickenbacker 12-string electric guitar, 12-string and 6-string acoustic guitars
- Dennis Smith – backing vocals, Rickenbacker bass guitar
- Seb Shelton – Premier drums and timpani, assorted percussion
- Dave Winthrop – tenor and baritone saxophones
- Maggie Ryder – guest backing vocals (3)
- The Glory Boys Choir – extra backing vocals

Technical

- Simon Humphrey – engineer, executive producer
- Ian Page – producer
- David Cairns – producer
- Fin Costello – photography
- Graphyk – design
