= Vernon Geyer =

American musician and composer

Vernon Geyer (born around 1904 in Oklahoma) was an American musician and composer, best remembered for his recordings as a swing organist during the late 1930s.

Early in his musical career, Geyer showcased his talent by writing the words and music for the song "Only You", which was copyrighted in 1924. He gained recognition for his musical skills, and in 1931 Geyer secured the position of chief organist at the RKO Majestic Theatre in San Antonio, Texas.

He became an early proponent of the Hammond organ, which had been patented by Laurens Hammond in 1934. Between 1936 and 1939, Geyer recorded for various record labels, including Bluebird, Regal Zonophone, Victor, and Montgomery Ward. These recordings demonstrated his skills on the keyboard, and also served to promote the versatility of the Hammond organ.

In 1938, he took on the role of music supervisor for the film The Alamo: Shrine of Texas Liberty.

By 1940, Geyer had become a member of the American Federation of Musicians and was being billed as "America's number one recording artist on the Hammond electric organ". Throughout the 1940s, he performed for live audiences across the United States in nightclubs. In 1954, Geyer had the honor of playing the original musical score for the San Francisco Museum of Modern Art's screening of the 1916 film Intolerance by David Wark Griffith.

Geyer's recording of "My Marie" renewed interest in his work when it was featured in the soundtrack of the 2010 role-playing video game Space Funeral.
