= Alamo (surname) =

Alamo or Álamo is a Spanish surname. Notable people with the surname include:

- Antonio Alamo Jr., American physician and Nevada gaming official
- Frank Alamo (1941–2012), French singer
- Javi Álamo (born 1988), Spanish professional footballer
- Jony Álamo (born 2001), Spanish professional footballer
- José Álamo (1903–1940), Spanish footballer
- Ricardo Álamo (born 1970), Venezuelan actor and television director
- Rufina Alamo (born 1954), Spanish-American polymer scientist
- Susan Alamo, American religious figure
- Tony Alamo (evangelist), American preacher, singer, entrepreneur, religious evangelist, and convicted child sex offender
- Yomar Álamo, Puerto Rican professional boxer

== See also ==
- Alamo (disambiguation)
