= Business as Usual (Secret Affair album) =

Studio album by Secret Affair
- Released: 29 January 1982
- Recorded: Summer 1981
- Studio: Rouche (Cornwall); Red Bus (London)
- Genre: Mod revival; power pop
- Label: I-Spy
- Producer: Secret Affair; Martin Griffin; Nick Tauber; Simon Fraser; Colin Thurston

Secret Affair chronology
Behind Closed Doors (1980)	Business as Usual (1982)	Soho Dreams (2012)

Singles from Business as Usual
- 1. "Do You Know" Released: 25 September 1981; 2. "Lost in the Night (Mack the Knife)" Released: 22 January 1982

Professional ratings
Review scores
Source	Rating
AllMusic	2/5 stars
Record Mirror	2/5 stars

Business as Usual is the third album by mod revival band Secret Affair, released in January 1982 by their label I-Spy. The album peaked at number 84 on the UK Albums Chart.

== Background and release ==
After the commercial disappointment of the band's previous album Behind Closed Doors, Ian Page and David Cairns, whose relationship had strained during that album, decided to tour in America and Canada in March 1981. In the USA, they "could be taken at face value", unlike in the UK where they were "deemed to be merely the product of a youth cult". Drummer Seb Shelton had left the band in December 1980 to join Dexys Midnight Runners and was replaced by Paul Bultitude, whose cousin was the band's bassist Dennis Smith. Three months of touring had brought Page and Cairns closer and had given the band confidence to record another album.

The band began recording at Red Bus Studios in London with Colin Thurston as producer. The tracks "Three Wise Monkeys" and "The Big Beat" were recorded there, before the band relocated to Rouche Studios in Cornwall. The band brought in Nick Tauber to work on the recordings and he decided to speed up the master tapes. According to a news piece in Record Mirror, the album was intended to be released on 23 October 1981, however, it was not released until January 1982.

The album saw the band go back to basics and return to their "soul roots and the dance credibility of their first album". The first single, "Do You Know", peaked at only number 57 on the UK Singles Chart and the second single, "Lost in the Night (Mack the Knife)", failed to chart, something that, similar with their previous album, could be blamed on a lack of promotion from I-Spy's parent label Arista Records. The band had hoped to release "One Day (In Your Life)", which Chris Hunt described as "easily the best song that the band had written since 'My World'", as their last single. However, to do it justice, it would have to be re-recorded and Arista weren't willing to finance it. The album was deleted after only 11,000 copes and after going on tour in the UK, which Page described as a "nightmare, worrying if enough people would turn up to cover costs", the band split.

== Reception ==
The reception of the album was summed up well by Carol Clerk for Melody Maker, who wrote "I’m surprised that Secret Affair have stayed together long enough to record a third album after their systematic dismembering by the music press. The last album, brimming as it was with exquisitely tuneful songs, fell by the wayside, a victim of criminal neglect" and that Business as Usual "deserves the attention of an all too apathetic public." However, Record Mirror reviewer Peter Coyne was much more critical, writing that "the complete and utter failure of the truly pathetic 'mod movement' of 1979 to produce anything worthy is neatly mirrored by Secret Affair's present artistic inactivity and uselessness". He concluded that "Secret Affair need to immediately rethink their methods of composing and re-evaluate their current position – or cut their losses and disband".

Reviewing retrospectively for AllMusic, Jo-Ann Greene described the album as "a sad case of being in the wrong place at the wrong time, in the wrong clothes" and that "in the U.K., this album was mostly ignored and seen by some as a step backwards, and while the U.S. was readying the white flag, the country would only surrender to men in makeup and extravagant outfits. [Secret] Affair was still garbed in their smart mod suits, so what chance did they really have?"

== Track listing ==
All tracks are written by Ian Page and David Cairns

Side one
No.	Title	Length
1.	"Lost in the Night"	3:32
2.	"Follow the Leader"	3:01
3.	"Do You Know?"	4:09
4.	"Hide and Seek"	3:11
5.	"I Could Be You"	2:48
6.	"Somewhere in the City"	3:20

Side two
No.	Title	Length
7.	"She's on Fire"	3:35
8.	"Three Wise Monkeys"	3:26
9.	"One Voice in the Darkness"	3:23
10.	"Dancemaster"	3:07
11.	"The Big Beat"	2:47
12.	"One Day (In Your Life)"	4:17

== Personnel ==
Secret Affair

- Ian Page – lead vocals, keyboards, trumpets
- David Cairns – guitars, backing vocals
- Dennis Smith – bass guitar, backing vocals
- Paul Bultitude – drums, percussion
- Dave Winthrop – saxophones

Technical

- Secret Affair – producer (all tracks except 8 and 11), remixing (8 and 11)
- Nick Tauber – producer (all tracks except 8 and 11), remixing (8 and 11)
- Simon Fraser – producer (all tracks except 8 and 11), remixing (8 and 11)
- Martin Griffin – producer (all tracks except 8 and 11)
- Colin Thurston – producer (8 and 11)
- Cooke Key – design
- Marcus Wilson Smith – front photography
- Tommy Wroblewski – band photography
