= Behind Closed Doors (Secret Affair album) =

Studio album by Secret Affair
- Released: 12 September 1980
- Recorded: 1980
- Genre: Mod revival
- Length: 37:31
- Label: I-Spy
- Producer: Ian Page; David Cairns

Secret Affair chronology
Glory Boys (1979)	Behind Closed Doors (1980)	Business as Usual (1982)

Singles from Behind Closed Doors
- 1. "My World" Released: 22 February 1980; 2. "Sound of Confusion" Released: 1 August 1980

Behind Closed Doors is the second album by mod revival band Secret Affair, released in September 1980 by their label I-Spy. The album peaked at number 48 on the UK Albums Chart.

== Background and release ==
The album saw a change in direction by the band, with Page saying "the first priority was to make it different from the first, to show the wide range of styles and influences there are within the band".

Apart from two songs, the songs on this album were written by either Ian Page or David Cairns, unlike their previous album, Glory Boys. Cairns admitted that this was because "Ian was in the States remixing the first album for the American market and I was over here. We were told out of the blue that we had to get a second album together right now as owing to touring commitments we wouldn’t have any other time. So in the end we worked independently; he presented his songs and I came up with mine."

The first single released from the album was "My World". It became the band's second highest charting single, peaking at number 16 on the UK Singles Chart. The second single, "Sound of Confusion" was released a month before the album was released, and only peaked at number 45 on the chart.

The album was released on CD in 2001 by Captain Mod Records, which included the two B-sides to the singles as bonus tracks. In December 2020, for the 40th anniversary of the album, Behind Closed Doors was reissued on vinyl as a limited 300 copies.

== Reception ==
Professional ratings
Review scores
Source	Rating
AllMusic	3/5 stars
Record Mirror	5/5 stars
Smash Hits	5/10

Reviewing for Record Mirror, Simon Ludgate gave the album five out of five, writing "Page and Cairns have opted for more mature arrangements than before, adopting a touch of the Bruce Springsteen in the emotional overkill department. But at least dis got soul, man." "Secret Affair have stopped worrying about getting stains on their tonics and applied themselves successfully to producing some first rate music."

However, reviewing for NME, Chris Bohn wrote that "unlike Glory Boys, Behind Closed Doors lacks any real focus or overall coherence. It's a collection of patchy movie scenarios composed, mostly separately, by Page and Cairns. But the bittiness of the more sophisticated sound makes it apparent that the two need each other. Page's melodies aren't really strong enough to support the expansive widescreen arrangements he attempts, while Cairns' dogged lyrical pursuit of a youth movement no longer there could do with an injection of the singer's pragmatism."

Jim Green for Trouser Press wrote "Dave Cairns's guitar is muted by keyboards and even sweetened by strings; Page avoids outright soppiness, but the raw edge that might have made this an exciting LP has been compromised, presumably in the name of self-expression and individuality. (There! I didn't say commercialism!) The bottom line, however, is the material. There are no dire tracks, and most are at least pleasant. 'Live for Today', which deserves far more urgent music, points out that some bland, pretty-ish tunes aren't suited to the lyrics. When it all comes together, as on the ambitious 'When the Show Is Over' or the straightforward 'I'm a Bullet', the results are impressive."

== Track listing ==
Side one
No.	Title	Writer(s)	Length
1.	"What Did You Expect?"	Ian Page	5:03
2.	"I'm a Bullet"	David Cairns	3:43
3.	"Only Madmen Laugh"	Page, Cairns, John Harty	4:05
4.	"When the Show's Over"	Page, Cairns	3:54
5.	"My World"	Cairns	3:37

Side two
No.	Title	Writer(s)	Length
6.	"Sound of Confusion"	Cairns	2:59
7.	"Life's a Movie Too"	Page	3:21
8.	"Looking Through My Eyes"	Cairns	2:47
9.	"Live for Today"	Page	2:24
10.	"Streetlife Parade"	Cairns	5:38
Total length:			37:31

2001 CD bonus tracks
No.	Title	Writer(s)	Length
11.	"So Cool"	Page	3:03
12.	"Take It or Leave It"	Page, Cairns	2:25

== Personnel ==
Secret Affair

- Ian Page – lead vocals, keyboards, trumpets
- David Cairns – guitars, backing vocals
- Dennis Smith – bass guitar, backing vocals
- Seb Shelton – drums, percussion
- Dave Winthrop – saxophones

Technical

- Simon Humphrey – engineer, associate producer
- Tim Young – mastering
- Ian Page – producer (all tracks), strings arrangement
- David Cairns – producer (6)
- Keith Breeden – sleeve
- Rene Eyre – illustration
- Andrew Douglas – photography
