= Alamo (disambiguation) =

The Battle of the Alamo was a battle fought during the Texas Revolution.

Alamo or The Alamo may also refer to:

== Places ==
- Álamo, Veracruz
- Alamo, California
- Alamo, Georgia
- Alamo, Indiana
- Alamo Township, Michigan
- Alamo, Nevada
- Alamo, New Mexico
- Alamo, North Dakota
- Alamo, Tennessee
- Alamo, Texas, a town
- Alamo Heights, Texas, a suburb of San Antonio
- Alamo Mission, historic Spanish mission in San Antonio, Texas
- Alamo River, a river in California

== Films ==
- The Alamo: Shrine of Texas Liberty, a 1936 film
- The Alamo (1960 film), a film starring John Wayne
- The Alamo: 13 Days to Glory, a 1987 film
- Alamo: The Price of Freedom, a 1988 IMAX film shown exclusively at San Antonio's Rivercenter Mall Imax theatre
- The Alamo (2004 film)

== Other uses ==
- Alamo (sculpture), in New York City
- Alamo Rent a Car
- Alamo Drafthouse Cinema
- AA-10 Alamo or Vympel R-27, an air-to-air missile
- USS Alamo (LSD-33), a U.S. Navy amphibious assault warship
- "Alamo", a song by Tori Amos used as a b-side on "Talula"
- Alamo Game Engine, software from Petroglyph Games
- Ficus cotinifolia, commonly known as the alamo tree

== People ==
- Alamo (surname)

== See also ==
- Alamo bolide impact
- Alamo Scouts
- Alamo Village, a movie set turned tourist attraction, in Brackettville, Texas
- "Remember the Alamo" (song)
- Alamos (disambiguation)
- Alameda (disambiguation)
