= Montgomery Ward Records =

American record label

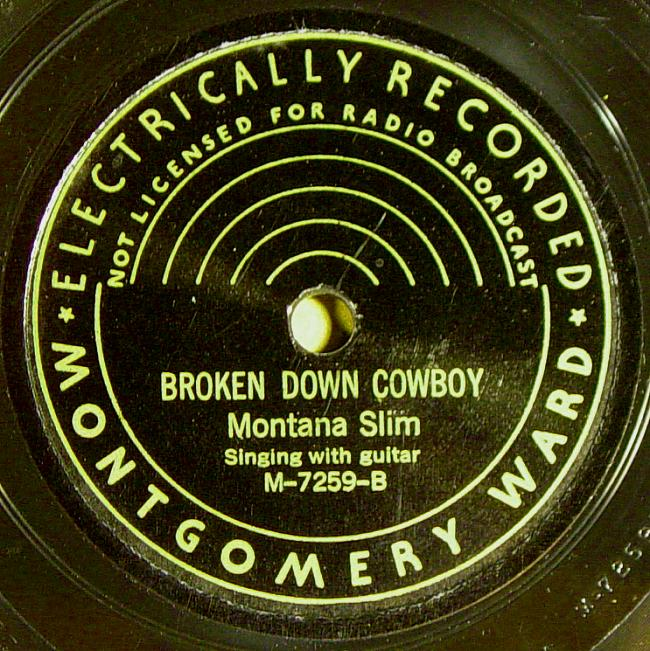
Montana Slim release on a Montgomery Ward issue

Montgomery Ward Records was American retailer Montgomery Ward's store brand record label. The records were sold at a lower than industry standard prices through company stores and catalogs. During its prolific run, the label issued many important country and jazz recordings.

== History ==
Production of the label began in 1933 as an in-house budget label, with an arrangement with RCA Victor that gave Montgomery Ward access to every style of music in Victor's vault. The first issues were pressed by RCA Victor and included popular music as well as country (including Cajun), race records, ethnic material with catalog numbers beginning at M-4200, which was intended to match and replace (often with different artists) that of Broadway Records, which although not exclusive to Wards had been extensively marketed by them. A second series recorded and pressed by Victor, beginning with M-6000, was devoted to classical music.

Montgomery Ward also had a short-lived contract with Decca Records that resulted in releases of both Decca and some Gennett Records material to which Decca held rights. Decca-originated issues can be identified by the lack of a "M" prefix before the catalog number. Material originating from Eli Oberstein's United States Record Corporation (Varsity, Royale) including older Crown Records recordings, was issued in a short-lived M-3000 series which also included material from Paramount Records, Gennett, and various foreign labels to which Oberstein's claim of ownership was dubious.

Production ceased in December 1941, by which time the long-standing release agreement between Montgomery Ward and RCA Victor ended.

== Released material ==
Because Montgomery Ward's catalogs were widely distributed in rural areas, country music was a large part of Montgomery Ward's catalog, including many releases of importance to collectors. The records were priced for consumers at well below industry average, 21 cents per record or $1.79 in groups of ten. Older material such as recordings by Henry Burr and Cal Stewart, which continued to sell in rural areas, were released. Most of the released material was from recordings originally made for Bluebird Records, although many were never released on that label, leaving Montgomery Ward as the sole issue.
