= Saiichi =

- Gender: Male

Origin
- Origin: Japanese
- Meaning: Different meanings depending on the kanji used

Saiichi (written: 才一 or 栽一) is a masculine Japanese given name. Notable people with the name include:

- Saiichi Maruya (丸谷 才一) (1925–2012), Japanese writer and literary critic
- Saiichi Sugiyama (杉山 栽一) (born 1960), British-based Japanese musician/composer and lawyer
