= Walk on Fire (band) =

British rock band

- Origin: London, England
- Genres: Rock, New wave
- Years active: 1988–1991; 2017
- Labels: Uni/MCA (US); MCA (UK)
- Members: Alan King (vocals); David Cairns (keyboards); Phil Williams (bass/vocals); Trevor Thorton (drums) (ex-Asia); Mike Casswell (guitar)

Walk on Fire was a British melodic rock band whose album Blind Faith (1989) yielded two minor hit singles: "Blind Faith" and "Wastelands".

The band was formed by David Cairns and Alan King in 1987, signing to UNI/MCA Records in the US, and MCA in the UK, and initially managed by Bill Curbishley. The early pre-production of the album was produced by Dave Cairns' former Secret Affair band-mate Dennis Smith, who also co-wrote one of the album tracks, "Tell It Like It Is" with Alan King. The album was recorded at Hook End Manor & The Virgin Manor Studios, Oxford, in the UK and produced by Walter Turbitt, engineer and producer of The Cars. It featured Steve Ferrone (drums), Keith Airey (guitar), Richard Cottle and Pete Vitesse (keyboards).

The live band featured Alan King (vocals), Michael Casswell (guitar), Trevor Thornton (drums), Phil Williams (bass) & David Cairns (keyboards). Walk on Fire toured with Foreigner, The Dan Reed Network, Ratt and Nils Lofgren and toured the UK extensively, but despite favourable reviews following the US release and over 245,000 units sold worldwide, the album was not enough of a commercial success for MCA Records to keep the band and Walk On Fire were regretfully dropped over financial issues. The band went on to record material (mainly) written and produced by Dave Cairns in 24 track recording studios in and around London for a second album but with the grunge music explosion, no label was going to sign an AOR album and the band broke up.

Alan King went on to sing the lead role in Jeff Wayne's follow up to 'War of The Worlds' - Spartacus - alongside Catherine Zeta-Jones and with a cast that included Anthony Hopkins and Dave Cairns went on to be appointed Special Projects and Events Manager for Gibson Guitars USA throughout the 1990s. Dave Cairns reformed Secret Affair with Ian Page in 2009 and released their fourth studio album, Soho Dreams on I-SPY Records, in September 2012.

Guitarist Michael Casswell was invited by the bassist Neil Murray to join the Queen guitarist Brian May's touring band in 1991. Casswell left the band after the band's South American tour. Having performed and recorded with the UK based Japanese blues guitarist Saiichi Sugiyama (musician), whose band also featured Phil Williams on bass, Casswell subsequently formed a band with the veteran British rock drummer Cozy Powell. Casswell co-wrote and co-produced with Powell what turned out be the drummer's last album session. The album was released as Especially For You after Powell's death in a British motorway accident. Michael Casswell died in a swimming accident in September 2016.

On 21 April 2017, the second album by Walk On Fire, Mind Over Matter, was released on the AOR label, Escape Music. It was written and produced by David Cairns with additional song writing by vocalist Alan King and Thom Hardwell and featuring Michael Casswell on guitar, Phil Williams on bass, Trevor Thornton on drums and Richard Cottle on keyboards.

== Band members ==
- Alan King: Vocals
- Michael Casswell: Guitars, Backing Vocals
- David Cairns: Keyboards, Guitars
- Phil Williams: Bass, Backing Vocals
- Trevor Thornton: Drums

== Discography ==
=== Studio albums ===
- Blind Faith (1989)
- Mind Over Matter (2017)

=== Singles ===
- "Blind Faith" (1990)
- "Crime of Loving You" (1990)
- "Wastelands" (1990)
