= Ian Page =

Ian Page may refer to:

- Ian Page (singer) (born 1960), British singer and author
- Ian Page (conductor) (born 1963), British conductor
