= Blind Faith (Walk on Fire album) =

Studio album by Walk on Fire
- Released: 1989
- Recorded: 1988–1989, Hook End Manor & The Virgin Manor, Oxford, England
- Genre: Rock
- Length: 46:03
- Label: MCA, UNI
- Producer: Walter Turbitt

Professional ratings
Review scores
Source	Rating
Allmusic	(Not Rated) link

Blind Faith is the debut record by British rock band Walk on Fire. It was released in 1989 on MCA and featured production by Walter Turbitt, who was known for his work with The Cars. It had two minor hits, the title track and "Wastelands".

After the album's release, the band toured extensively with Foreigner, The Dan Reed Network, RATT and Nils Lofgren, but commercial success eluded them (despite favorable reviews) and the band were dropped by MCA.

Since then a second album by Walk on Fire entitled Mind Over Matter was released April 2017 on Escape Music Ltd.

== Track listing ==
- All songs written by Dave Cairns, except where noted.
1. "Blind Faith" – 4:44
2. "Wastelands" – 4:40
3. "Crime Of Loving You" – 4:13
4. "Tell It Like It Is" (Cairns, Alan King, Dennis Smith) – 4:14
5. "Caledonia" (King) – 4:36
6. "Hearts Of Gold" – 5:03
7. "Hands Of Time" – 4:52
8. "Hungry For Heaven" – 4:01
9. "Miracle Of Life" – 4:45
10. "Close My Eyes" – 4:55

== Notes ==
- The song "Miracle Of Life" and "Wastlelands" were written solely by David Cairns (as the album credits and PRS confirm) and does not feature co-writing credits from Mark Mancina and Trevor Rabin (then guitarist for wildly popular band Yes). Mancina and Rabin also co-wrote a track of the same name for Yes's album Union. The title(s) are merely coincidental, as the two songs are nothing alike.

== Personnel ==
=== Walk on Fire ===
- Alan King: Vocals
- Mike Casswell: Acoustic & electric guitars
- Dave Cairns: Keyboards, additional acoustic & electric guitars
- Phil Williams: Bass, backing vocals
- John Henderson: Drums

=== Additional personnel ===
- Keith Airey: Guitars
- Richard Cottle, Tim Moore, Peter-John Vettese: Keyboards
- Graham Edwards: Bass
- Steve Ferrone: Drums, Percussion
- Andy Caine, Gary Dyson, Scott Gilman, "The Faithettes": Backing Vocals

== Production ==
- Produced By Walter Turbitt
- Recorded & mixed by Peter Jones & Walter Turbitt
- Assistant Engineer: Mark Wessel
- Mastered By Greg Calbi
