= Gene Kardos =

American jazz and dance orchestra leader (1899–1980)

Eugene Kardos (June 12, 1899 – July 27, 1980) was the leader of a jazz and dance orchestra in the 1930s. He recorded for Victor in 1931–32 and then recorded for ARC's labels (Perfect, Melotone, Banner, Oriole, Romeo, Vocalion etc.) through 1938.

Born in Yorkville, New York, of Hungarian heritage, Kardos learned to play the violin and saxophone and worked in vaudeville pit orchestras until organizing his first band around 1930. A New York territory band, its usual home base was the Gloria Palast, a German-American ballroom and café on East 86th Street in the Yorkville neighborhood. Due to the location of AFM Local 802 headquarters nearby, many music professionals caught Kardos's band.

Among his musicians were Hymie Schertzer (sax), Vic Schoen (trumpet, arranger), Joel Shaw (piano), and Bernie Green (arranger-composer). There were a sizable group of Kardos recordings issued on Crown under Shaw's name and various ARC recordings under names such as Gene's Merrymakers, Art Kahn, and Bob Causer. From the mid-1930s, Kardos' style changed more to a hotel dance band style. Dick Robertson and Bea Wain were vocalists on many of his recordings.

Disbanding in 1939, Kardos married and took employment with the postal service in New York City by day, while leading a small café-style band evenings at Zimmerman's Hungaria, a popular restaurant in Yorkville. His run there continued into the 1950s.
