= Intolerance Babylon set =

Silent movie set built in Los Angeles, United States

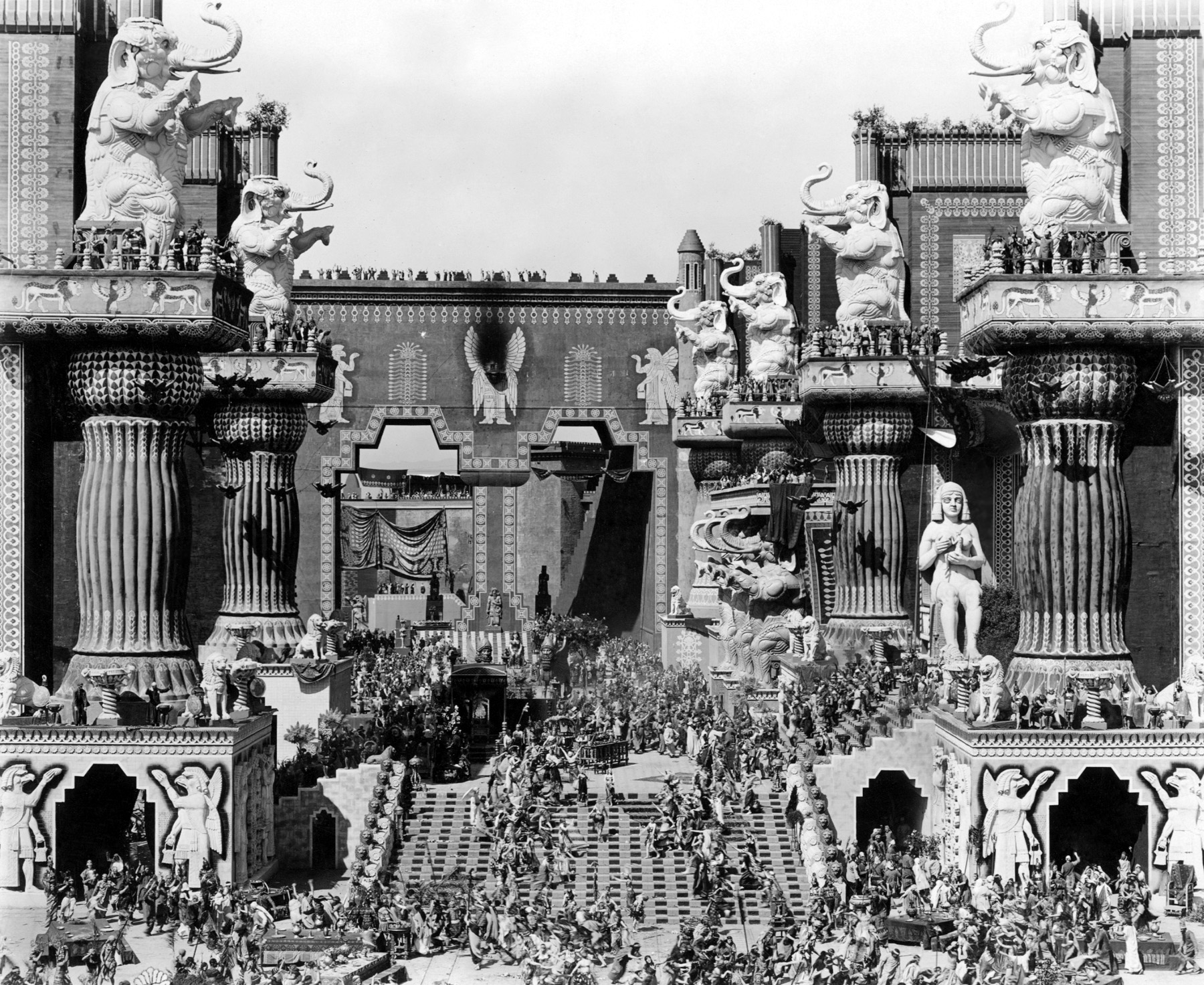
- Picture of set
- Interactive map of Intolerance Babylon set
- Address: 4473 Sunset Drive; Los Angeles, California
- Coordinates: 34.0984°N 118.2869°W

Construction
- Demolished: 1919

The Intolerance Babylon set was a recreation of the Gates of Babylon used for the 1916 movie Intolerance, directed by D. W. Griffith. The set-piece gained notoriety after the completion of the motion picture for not being torn down until several years after the movie's release. The set stood at the intersection of Sunset Blvd. and Hollywood Blvd., where the Vista Theatre now stands.

== History ==
After receiving harsh criticism in response to his 1915 movie The Birth of a Nation, director D. W. Griffith wanted his next film to be a form of retaliation against the critical claims, stating their points of view were a "kind of intolerance". He sought to tell stories of other characters who suffered worse than he did, involving a non-linear story spanning multiple eras. The earliest of these eras was the Babylonia segment, set in 539 BCE.

The iconic set-piece was built for the film Intolerance, in particular, for the filming of the Babylon segment. The set was built to scale, standing at 300 feet tall and adorned with gigantic elephant statues. When the movie was filmed, more than 3,000 extras were used to film shots of the sprawling Babylonian empire.

To create the set, Griffith was inspired by other silent epic motion pictures contemporary to the film's release; most notably, the 1914 silent feature Cabiria served as a blueprint for what Griffith had in mind.

At the time of its making, Intolerance was the longest production of its time, having started production in 1914 and wrapping up two years later. The film was a modest box office success, managing to recoup its enormous budget, but was widely perceived as a commercial disappointment compared to the immense returns for The Birth of a Nation.

== Abandonment of set ==
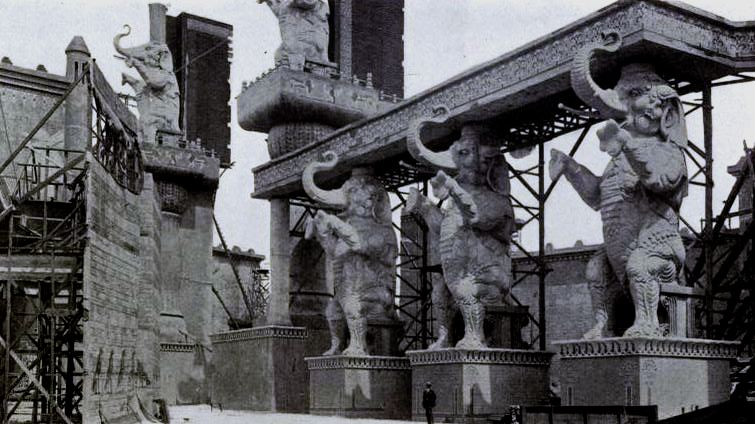
Another view of the set

As soon as the filming wrapped, Griffith discovered he did not have the funds to demolish the set properly and left it standing. Griffith would make use of the set one more time for his 1918 movie Hearts of the World, but by that point, the set had long been in disrepair. In 1919, three years after the release of Intolerance, the fire department of Los Angeles recognized the crumbling set-piece as a fire hazard and immediately ordered the building to be razed.

== Location today ==
After being torn down, the Vista Theatre was built in its place and still stands today. Hearts of the World would not be the last time that this site would be used as a filming location, as this intersection was also used for Scream 2, Get Shorty, and True Romance.

== Influence on architecture ==
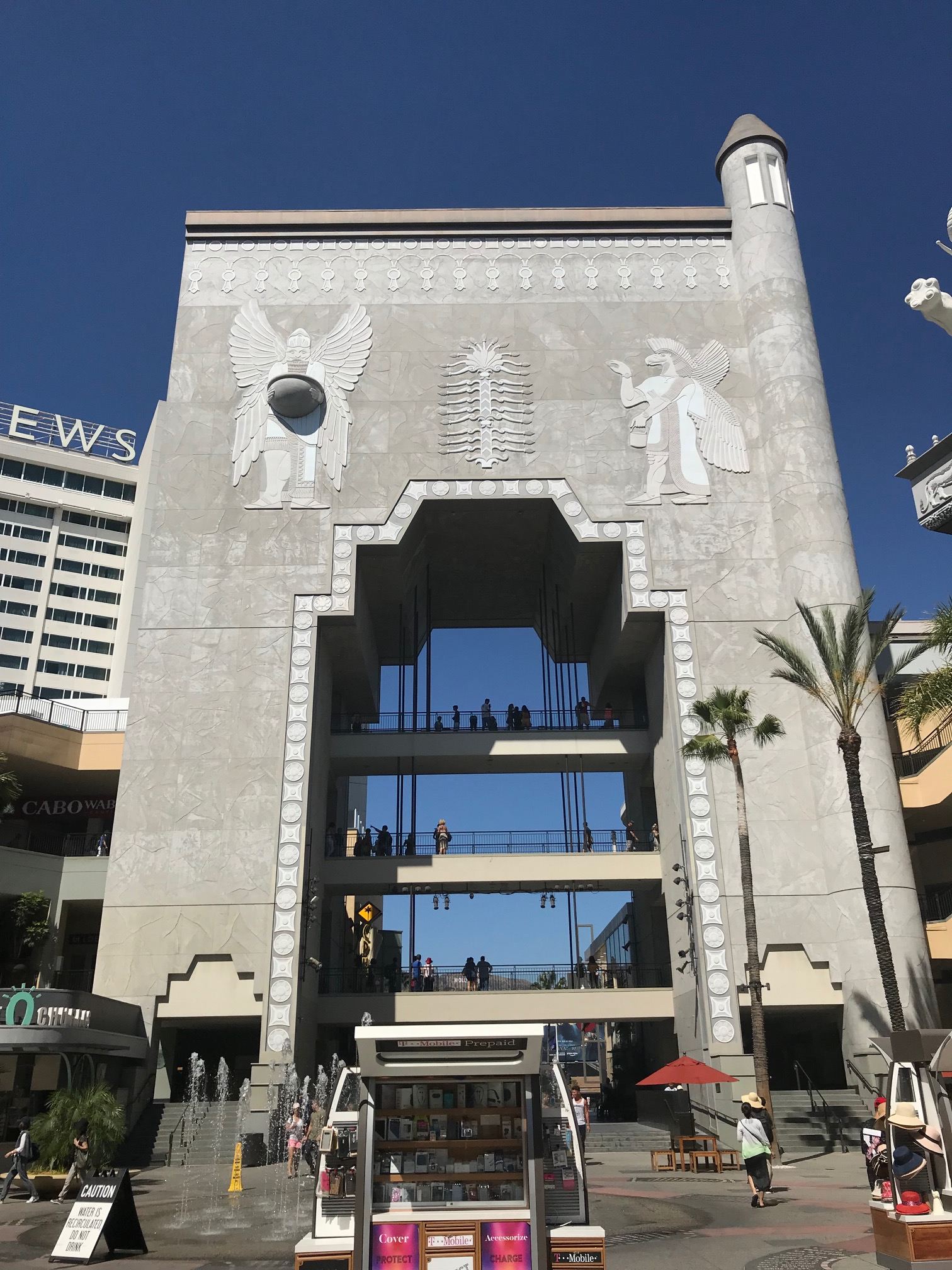
The former archway at the Hollywood and Highland center

The 12-story archway near the Dolby Theatre on Hollywood and Highland was designed after the Babylon set, even including facsimile elephants and Babylonia-inspired caricatures decorating it. Since 2021, this archway has been redecorated to separate ties between Hollywood and the questionable racial ethics of Griffith.

== In popular culture ==
The Babylon movie set is accessible in the 2011 video game L.A. Noire, for the case The Fallen Idol, although the set was torn down long before 1947, in which the game takes place.
