= The Alamo: Shrine of Texas Liberty =

1938 film by Stuart Paton

- Directed by: Stuart Paton
- Written by: Norman Sheldon
- Produced by: H.W. Kier
- Starring: Percy Barbat; Claudia Britton; Dayton Faulkner
- Narrated by: Percy Barbat
- Cinematography: Harry Forbes
- Edited by: Stuart Paton
- Music by: T. Ralph Willis
- Color process: Black and White
- Production company: Kier Film Company
- Release date: 1938
- Running time: 16 minutes
- Country: United States
- Language: English

The Alamo: Shrine of Texas Liberty is a 1938 American black-and-white Western war film directed by Stuart Paton and produced by H. W. Kier and Norman Sheldon. The film was a two-reel short produced in a couple of weeks in San Antonio, Texas. The film was done in pantomime and audio was done by narration and organ music.

The film starred Coates Gwynne, Sterling Waters and Mrs. Florence Griffith. The music supervisor was Vernon Geyer. The film is an educational reenactment of the siege at the Alamo, but the filming location was actually Mission San José. The film was released soon after the centennial of the Alamo.

== Cast ==
- Percy Barbat as Narrator (voice)
- Claudia Britton as Angelina
- Dayton Faulkner as Capt. Martin
- Mrs. Florence Griffith as Mrs. Dickenson
- Coates Gwynne as Travis
- Dittie Homeshea as Son
- J.R. Klumpp as Bowie
- Clarence Risien as Capt. Dickinson
- Sterling Waters as Davy Crockett
- Paul Willit as Santa Anna

== See also ==
- The Immortal Alamo (1911) earliest film on the Alamo
- Heroes of the Alamo (1937 film)
- The Alamo (1960) feature film starring John Wayne
- Alamo (disambiguation)#Films, for other films about the Alamo
