= Los Alamos =

Los Alamos usually refers to Los Alamos, New Mexico, United States.

Los Alamos may also refer to:

== Establishments ==
- Los Alamos National Laboratory
- Los Alamos Museum, unofficial name of the Bradbury Science Museum
- Los Alamos Ranch School, boys' school

== Places ==
=== Chile ===
- Los Álamos, Bíobío region

=== United States ===
- Los Alamos, California
- Los Alamos, New Mexico
- Los Alamos County, New Mexico
- Cañada de los Alamos, New Mexico

== Media ==
- Los Alamos, a novel by Joseph Kanon
- Los Alamos, a book by the photographer William Eggleston

== Other ==
- Los Alamos chess, a chess variant
- Los Alamos (AFDB-7), a former large floating dry dock
- Los Álamos, a station on the Cercanías Málaga commuter rail service in Málaga, Spain

== See also ==
- Alamos (disambiguation)
