= Art Kahn =

American jazz musician, composer and bandleader, active in 1920s

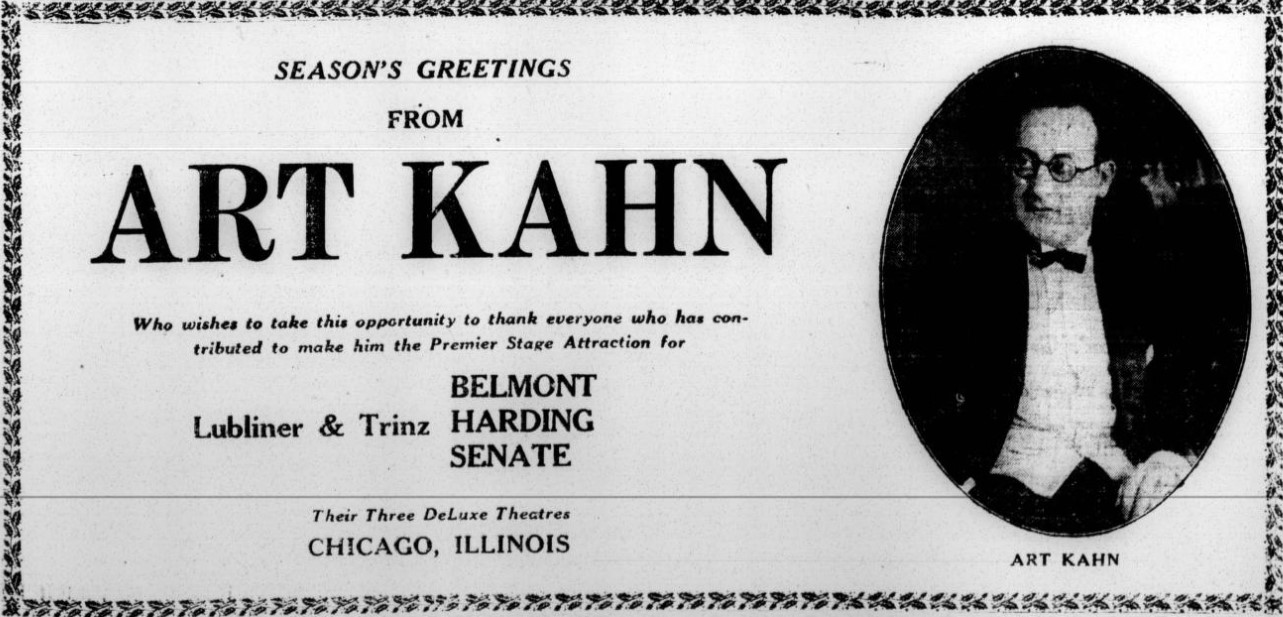
From a 1926 publication

Art Kahn was an American jazz musician, composer, and bandleader in Chicago during the 1920s. In later years, he sang and played piano as a solo act at the Torch Club in Chicago. The Art Kahn Orchestra recorded "Hello, Baby" with singer Ruth Etting in 1926. Other songs included "Shanghai Lullaby" (1924) and "When Day Is Done"( 1927) Art Kahn and His Orchestra appear in the short film, Gags and Gals (1936).

This name was also used as a pseudonym for Gene Kardos.
