= Crown Records (1930s label) =

Budget American record label

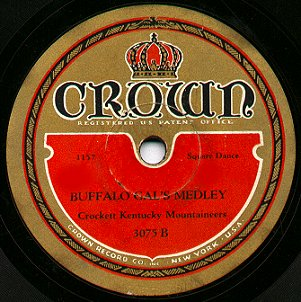
- A Crown record from the 1930s
- Founded: 1930
- Founder: Plaza Music Company
- Defunct: 1933
- Status: Inactive
- Genre: Jazz, blues, country
- Country of origin: U.S.
- Location: New York City

Crown Records was a record company and dime-store label that existed from 1930 to 1933 in New York City. Its catalogue included music by Eubie Blake and Fletcher Henderson. Known as the label offering "Two Hits for Two Bits" proudly printed on their sleeves, Crown's discs sold for 25 cents.

Crown was started by the Plaza Music Company after it was excluded from the merger which resulted in the American Record Corporation. The office was located at 10 West 20th Street, New York, and had recording studios at 330 West 42nd Street. Adrian Schubert was the recording director.

== Discs ==
Crown mostly used publishers' basic 'stock arrangements'. Releases didn't contain many hot solos and often were performed at a slower tempo than competitive dime-store recordings. Most of the releases were by session bands led by Adrian Schubert, Milt Shaw, Jack Albin, Lou Gold, Buddy Blue (Smith Ballew), The High Steppers, and Frank Novak. There were exceptions: Ben Pollack's band recorded for Crown using the name "Gil Rodin", while Gene Kardos's band used the name "Joel Shaw". A few black bands like Eubie Blake's and Fletcher Henderson's also recorded for Crown. Country music was recorded by Carson Robison, Frankie Marvin, and Frank and James McGravy, and later on during their existence employed working orchestras playing around the New York area, such as Gus Steck's Chanticleer Orchestra. Crown also issued a handful of "longer playing" 78s, featuring nearly five minutes of music at the same 25-cent price.

Although Crown recorded at its own studios, pressings were done by Victor Records, which made them the first client label pressed by RCA, although the first 100 or so Crown records do not resemble the standard Victor's pressing appearance. Victor was experimenting with its own budget series of labels beginning with the short-lived 1931 Timely Tunes label sold at Montgomery Ward. Then Victor started the Bluebird and Electradisk labels, originally as an 8-inch record. An early group of 10-inch Electradisk records (their 2500 series) look more like Crown masters than Victor masters, leading collectors to speculate that these early Electradisks might've been recorded at Crown's studios, based on appearance of the record and the typeface of the matrix numbers. This odd Electradisk series were made at two sessions in June 1932.

Crown competed with Hit of the Week, Columbia's line of 'cheaper' labels (Harmony, Velvet Tone and Clarion), as well as the ARC group of dime-store labels (Melotone, Perfect, Romeo, Oriole, etc.). Although Crown records turn up in the east, they are much less commonly found in the midwest and south, leading to the assumption that they did not have a full nationwide network of dealers, due to Depression conditions.

Some selected Crown sides were leased to Broadway Records in the U.S., to the Imperial, and Edison Bell Winner labels in the UK, and to Angelus, Lyric and Summit Records in Australia. A handful of Paramount masters were issued on Crown, as well. Crown also took over the Homestead Records mail order line from ARC.

After about 300 issues, Crown produced the very rare "Gem" label. All known Gems were exactly the same as the issue on Crown (for example, Joel Shaw's Crown 3414 of "Yeah Man" b/w "Jazz Pie" was also issued on Gem 3414). No one has been able to determine what store sold these rare records (or even what price they might have sold for), but the few copies that have turned up were in the New York/New Jersey area.

The last known Crown master was recorded on August 8, 1933, after reaching 533 records (3533).

In 1939–40, many of the jazzier Crown sides were issued on Eli Oberstein's short-lived Varsity Records, all from dubbed masters.

== Collectible records ==
Probably the most collectible records on Crown include:

- Ben Pollack – a couple using the name "Gil Rodin", and one record under Jack Teagarden's name
- Fletcher Henderson – five records issued under his name, and also Connie's Inn Orchestra
- Eubie Blake – seven records were issued
- Joel Shaw – a sizable number of records performed by Gene Kardos's orchestra under the name of his pianist
- For personality collectors, the vocal records made by Sylvia Froos, Welcome Lewis and Charlie Palloy are quite scarce and highly valued
- Benny Carter – one very rare side was recorded (the first under his name)
- A handful of Paramount blues and gospel sides, very rare (Blind Blake, Harum Scarums)

== Bibliography ==
- The American Record Label Book by Brian Rust (Arlington House Publishers, 1978)
- Two Hits For Two Bits - Crown Record and Master Listing by Robert R. Olson & Bill Korst (Joyce Publications, 1993)
