= Saiichi Sugiyama =

Musician (born 1960)

- Born: 1960 (age 65–66)
- Origin: Tokyo, Japan
- Genres: Blues, rock
- Occupations: Guitarist, singer-songwriter
- Instruments: Guitar, vocals
- Years active: 1976–present
- Label: various
- Website: saiichisugiyamaband.com, saiichi.com

Saiichi Sugiyama (born 1960 in Tokyo, Japan) is a British-based guitarist, singer and composer, best known for his writing and performing collaborations with Pete Brown, the lyricist for Cream since 2002 to date. His previous bands in 1990s featured Mike Casswell and Phil Williams of Walk on Fire, Andy Smith of Hot Chocolate, Zoot Money, Boz Burrell of Bad Company, John Cook of Rory Gallagher band as well as the guitarist, Paul Wassif. Sugiyama's self-published studio albums in 2000s featured Clem Clempson of Colosseum, Pete Brown (who co-wrote and co-produced the albums), Zoot Money and Ben Matthews of Thunder. Sugiyama plays a Gibson Les Paul guitar and Marshall amplifiers. His guitar style has more than a passing resemblance to that of Peter Green and has a vibrato technique similar that of Paul Kossoff.

Sugiyama collaborated with Mark Horiuchi, the former lead singer of the Japanese rock band Garo who had a number of chart hits in the Japanese chart in the early 1970s, and the duo recorded several tracks that were included in the album So Am I, released in Japan in 2004. Sugiyama moved from Tokyo to England in 1980 and has lived in Surrey.

In January 2014, the Saiichi Sugiyama Band released the live studio album The Smokehouse Sessions, featuring Sugiyama, Rietta Austin (vocals), Ben Reed (bass guitar) and Mune Sugiyama (drums).

== Discography ==
- Saiichi Sugiyama (November 1994)
- So Am I (July 2004)
- SAIICHI (May 2005)
- The Smokehouse Sessions (vinyl edition – November 2013; CD edition – January 2014; Saiichi Sugiyama Band)
