= Cedar Creek Sheik =

American singer

- Born: Philip McCutchen; February 14, 1910; Suttons, South Carolina, U.S.
- Died: October 7, 1964 (aged 54) outside Andrews, South Carolina, U.S.
- Genres: Hokum; Blues
- Occupation: Musician
- Instruments: Vocal; Guitar

Philip McCutchen (February 14, 1910 – October 7, 1964), known on his records as The Cedar Creek Sheik, was an American hokum and blues singer and guitarist who recorded in the 1930s.

McCutchen was born in Suttons, Williamsburg County, South Carolina, near Cedar Creek. Little is known of his life. His only recordings, of which ten tracks were issued, were made in Charlotte, North Carolina for Bluebird Records, on June 15, 1936. Several of his recordings, including "Buy It From the Poultry Man (Cock For Sale)" and "I Believe Somebody's Ridin' My Mule", were bawdy examples of hokum music, while others mention local situations and personalities. He sang in a "high, almost expressionless" voice, sometimes employing a yodel. Though some critics have thought him to be a white rather than black performer, he is recorded as of "negro" race in census records.

McCutchen died at 7:55am. on October 7, 1964.

== Discography ==
- Carolina Blues Guitar 1936-1951 (Old Tramp, 1988)
