= Maurice Oberstein =

Music executive

- Born: Maurice Louis Oberstein; September 26, 1928; New York City, United States
- Died: August 13, 2001 (aged 72); London, England
- Occupation: Music executive
- Years active: 1960–1993
- Known for: Chairman of CBS Records UK and BPI

Maurice Louis "Obie" Oberstein (26 September 1928—13 August 2001) was an American music business executive. He spent most of his career in Britain, where he was credited as "one of the chief architects of the modern UK record industry".

== Biography ==
He was born in a Jewish family in New York City, the only son of music industry executive and record label owner Eli Oberstein and his wife Iris. Maurice studied chemical engineering and law, and had a brief spell in the US Army, before working for his father's Rondo label. He sold the label in 1961 after his father's death. In 1963, he obtained clearance from John F. Kennedy's estate to release an album of the assassinated President's speeches, John Fitzgerald Kennedy: A Memorial Album, which reportedly sold over 4 million copies in a month and was said to be the fastest-selling LP in the world at that time.

He joined Columbia Records in New York in 1965, and soon afterwards was sent to London to help develop the company's CBS label in Britain. He rose through the ranks of management at the company, eventually becoming the chairman of CBS Records UK in 1976. He promoted British acts such as The Clash, New Hearts and Adam and the Ants, and oversaw the successful international promotion of Jeff Wayne's War of the Worlds album. In the 1980s, he championed emerging songwriters, notably George Michael and Norm Bellis. Acts that he promoted included Sade, Wham! and of course George Michael. During his period at CBS, the company had 44 no.1 hits on the UK singles chart. He chaired the BPI (British Phonographic Industry) trade association between 1983 and 1985, and was a member of the Band Aid organising committee.

In 1985 he threatened to leave Columbia and join its rival Polygram. Columbia boss Walter Yetnikoff retaliated by announcing Oberstein's retirement at a conference. However, later that year Oberstein became managing director of Polygram Music, responsible for the company's acquisition of the A&M and Island catalogues, and ABBA's recordings. He was also appointed to a second two-year term as chairman of BPI in 1991.

Oberstein was known for his forthright opinions and flamboyant eccentricities. He often brought one of his dogs to business meetings and awards ceremonies and would pretend to listen to its advice. He always wore a hat, sometimes bizarrely, and in disputes would place his hat on the table and leave the room, with the parting instruction to "talk to the hat".

After his retirement he returned to the US in 1993, taking a post as "Professor of Pop" at the University of Miami. However, he remained an Anglophile, frequently returning to Britain. He died in London in 2001, aged 72, of a heart attack while suffering from leukaemia, leaving instructions that his ashes should be scattered at Cheltenham Racecourse and at Queen's Park Rangers' football ground.
