= Intolerance (film) =

1916 film directed by D. W. Griffith

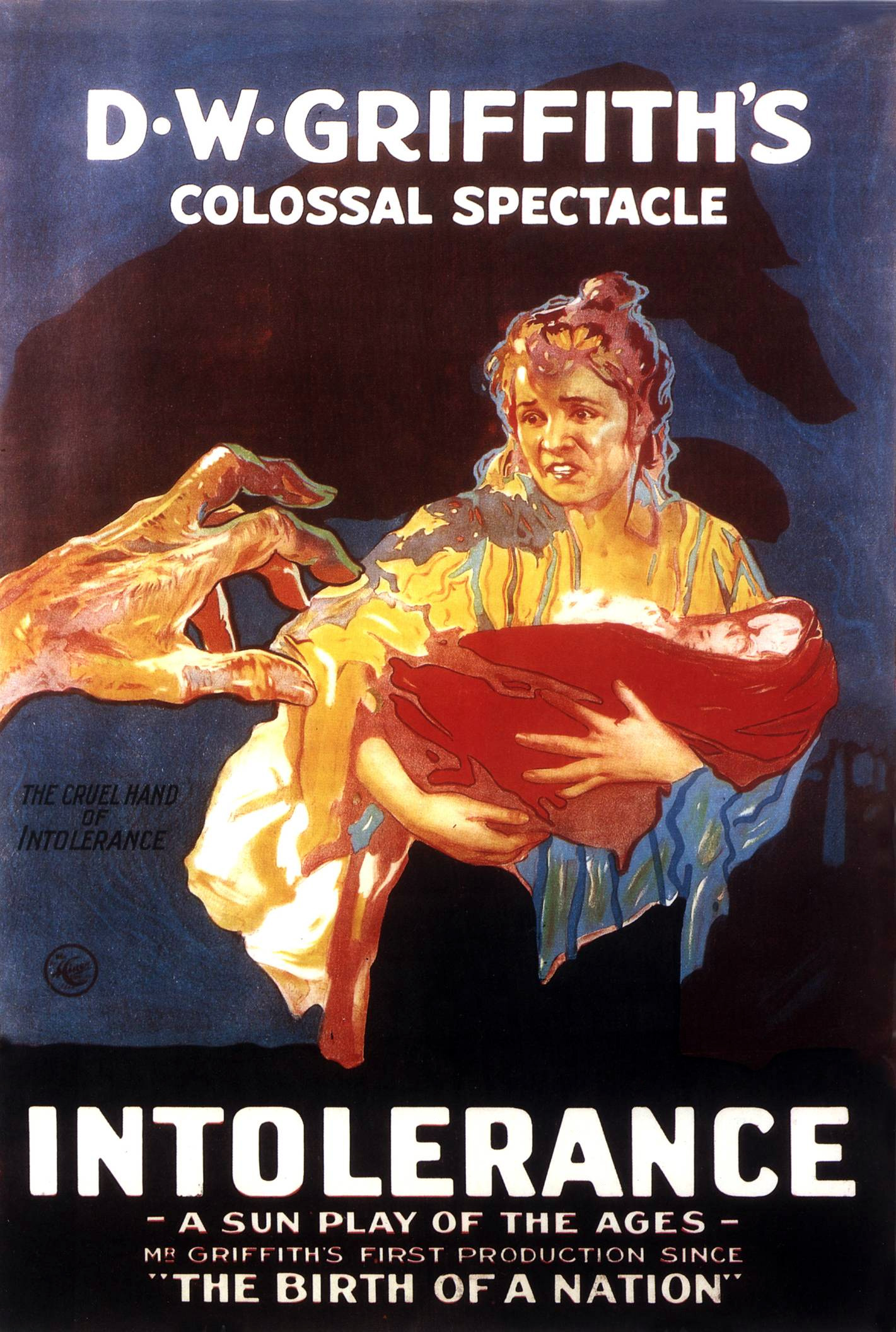
- Theatrical poster
- Directed by: D. W. Griffith
- Written by: D. W. Griffith; Hettie Gray Baker; Anita Loos; Mary H. O'Connor; Frank E. Woods
- Produced by: D. W. Griffith
- Starring: Lillian Gish; Mae Marsh; Robert Harron; Howard Gaye; Constance Talmadge
- Cinematography: G. W. Bitzer
- Edited by: D. W. Griffith; James Smith; Rose Smith
- Music by: Joseph Carl Breil; Julián Carrillo; Carl Davis (1989 restoration)
- Distributed by: Triangle Distributing Corporation
- Release date: September 5, 1916 (U.S.)
- Running time: 210 minutes (original release); 197 minutes (most surviving cuts)
- Country: United States
- Language: Silent (English intertitles)
- Budget: $385,907
- Box office: $1.75 million (theatrical rental)

Intolerance is a 1916 American anthology silent film directed by D. W. Griffith. Subtitled as Love's Struggle Throughout the Ages and A Sun-Play of the Ages, the three-and-a-half-hour epic intercuts four parallel storylines, each separated by several centuries: first, a contemporary melodrama of crime and redemption; second, a Biblical story: Christ's mission and death; third, a French story: the events surrounding the St. Bartholomew's Day massacre of 1572; and fourth, a Babylonian story: the fall of the Babylonian Empire to Persia in 539 BC. Each story had its own distinctive color tint in the original print. The scenes are linked by shots of a figure representing Eternal Motherhood, rocking a cradle.

Griffith chose to explore the theme of intolerance partly in response to his previous film, The Birth of a Nation (1915), being derided by the NAACP and others for perpetuating and supporting racial stereotypes and glorifying the Ku Klux Klan. Intolerance was not, however, an apology, as Griffith felt he had nothing to apologize for; in numerous interviews, he made clear that the film was intended as a rebuttal to his critics, whom he believed were themselves intolerant. In the years following its release, Intolerance strongly influenced European film movements and is regarded by critics as one of the most influential films of the silent era and one of the greatest films ever made. In 1958, the film was voted number seven in the World Expo film poll. In 1989, it was among the first films selected for preservation in the United States National Film Registry for being "culturally, historically, or aesthetically significant".

== Storylines ==
The film consists of four distinct, but parallel, stories—intercut with increasing frequency as the film builds to a climax—that demonstrate mankind's persistent intolerance throughout the ages. The timeline covers approximately 2,500 years.

1. The ancient "Babylonian" story (539 BC) depicts the conflict between Prince Belshazzar of Babylon and Cyrus the Great of Persia. The fall of Babylon is a result of intolerance arising from a conflict between devotees of two rival Babylonian gods—Bel-Marduk and Ishtar.
2. The Biblical "Judean" story (c. AD 27) recounts how—after the Wedding at Cana and the Woman Taken in Adultery—intolerance led to the Crucifixion of Jesus. This sequence is the shortest of the four.
3. The Renaissance "French" story (1572) tells of the religious intolerance that led to the St. Bartholomew's Day Massacre of Protestant Huguenots fomented by the Catholic Royal House of Valois.
4. The American "Modern" story (c. 1914) demonstrates how crime, moral puritanism, and conflicts between ruthless capitalists and striking workers help ruin the lives of marginalized Americans. To get more money for his spinster sister's charities, a mill owner orders a 10% pay cut to his workers' wages. An ensuing workers' strike is crushed and The Boy and The Dear One make their way to another city; she lives in poverty and he turns to crime. After they marry, he tries to break free of crime but is framed for theft by his ex-boss. While he is in prison, his wife must endure their child being taken away by the same "moral uplift society" that instigated the strike. Upon his release from prison, he discovers his ex-boss attempting to rape his wife. A struggle begins and in the confusion the girlfriend of the boss shoots and kills the boss. She escapes and The Boy is convicted and sentenced to the gallows. A kindly policeman helps The Dear One find the real killer and together they try to reach the Governor in time so her reformed husband will not be hanged.

Breaks between differing time periods are marked by the symbolic image of a mother rocking a cradle, representing the passing of generations. The film simultaneously cross-cuts back and forth and interweaves the segments over great gaps of space and time, with over 50 transitions between the segments. One of the unusual characteristics of the film is that many of the characters do not have names. Griffith wished them to be emblematic of human types. Thus, the central female character in the modern story is called The Dear One, her young husband is called The Boy, and the leader of the local Mafia is called The Musketeer of the Slums. Critics and film theorists maintain that these names reveal Griffith's sentimentalism, which was already hinted at in The Birth of a Nation, with names such as The Little Colonel.

== Cast ==
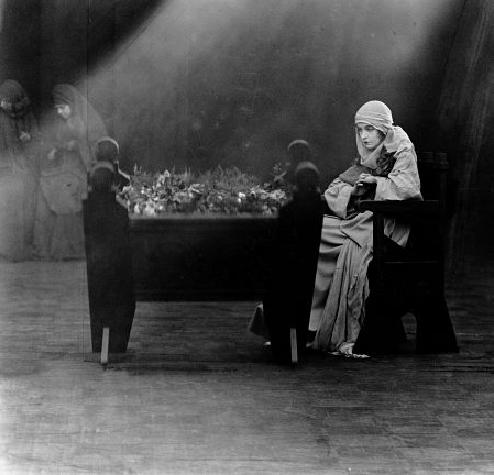
Lillian Gish as "Eternal Motherhood"

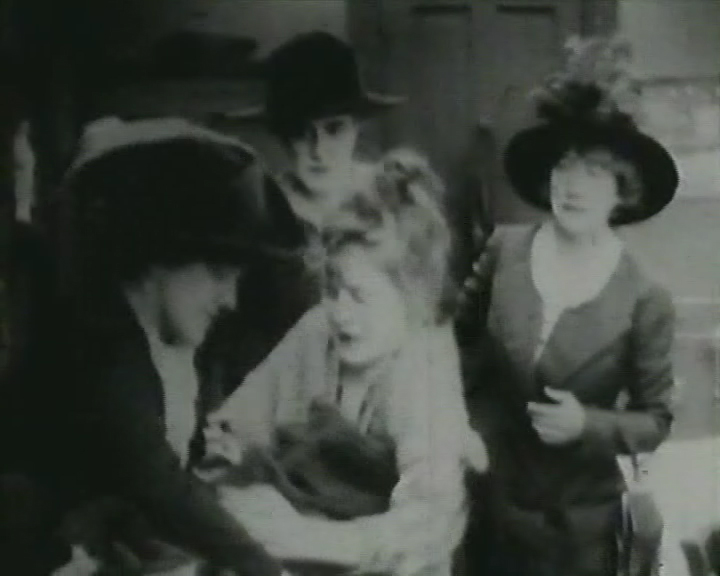
Mae Marsh fights against the Uplifters

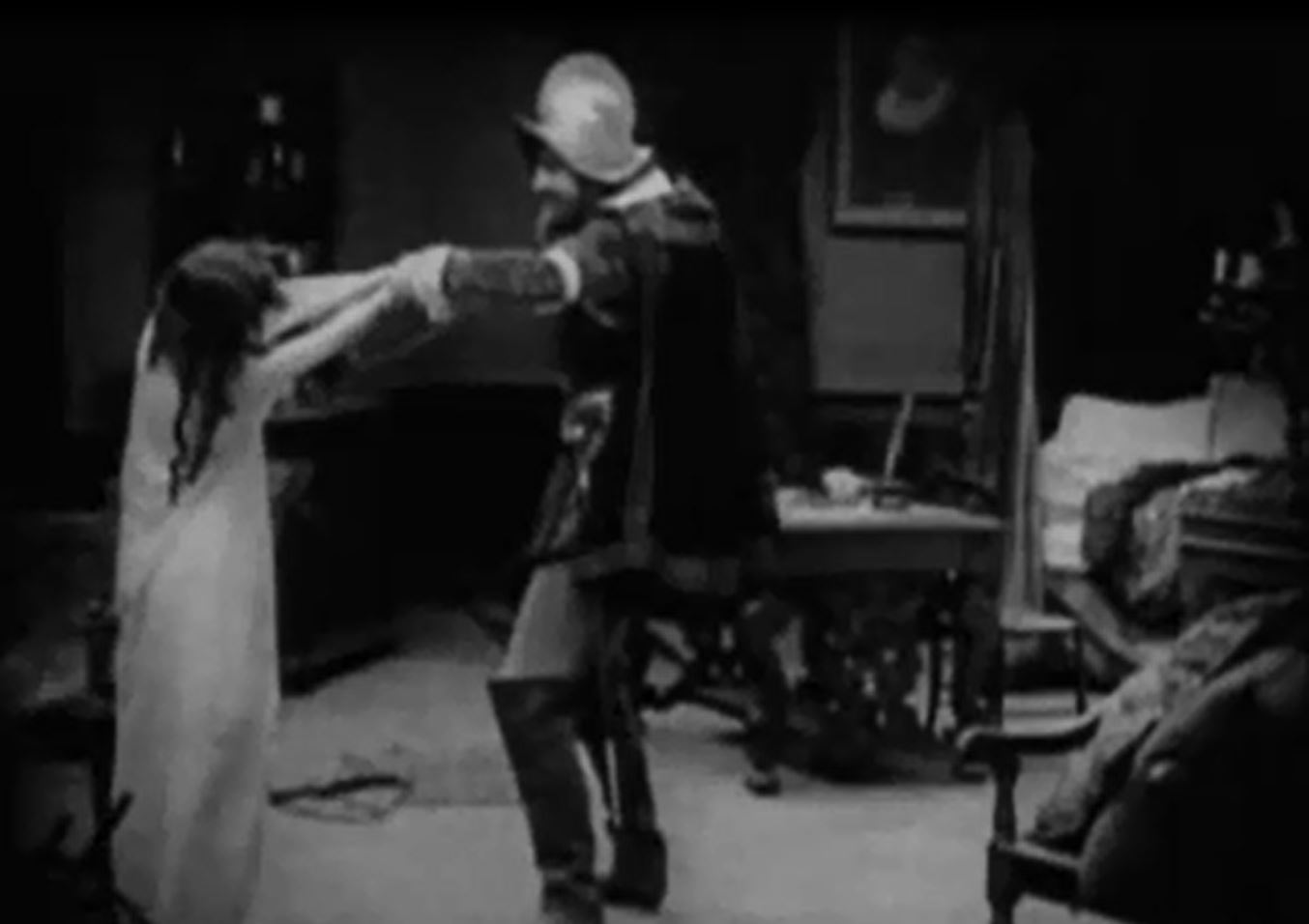
The Mercenary Soldier (Allan Sears) kills Brown Eyes (Margery Wilson)

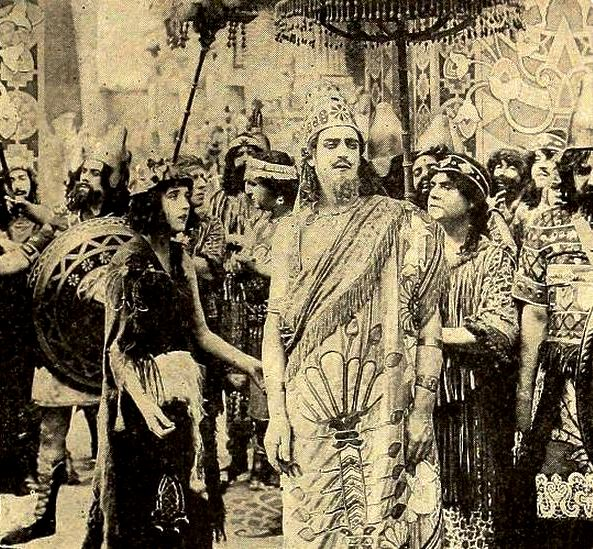
Alfred Paget as Prince Belshazzar

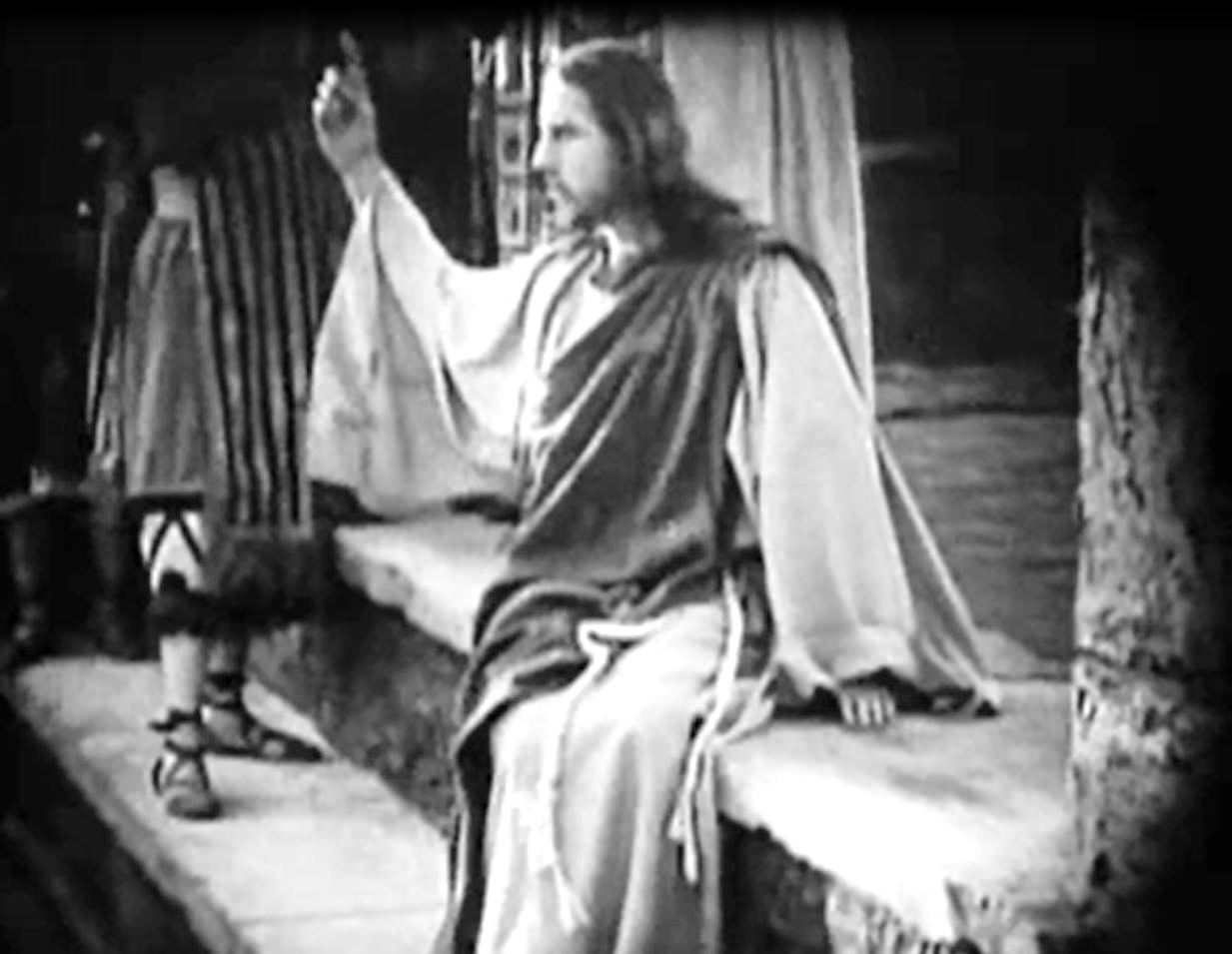
Howard Gaye as the Nazarene

- Lillian Gish as The Eternal Motherhood

=== The American "Modern" story ===
- Mae Marsh as The Dear One
- Robert Harron as The Boy, a worker at Jenkins Mill
- Fred Turner as The Dear One's father, a worker at the Jenkins Mill
- Miriam Cooper as The Friendless One, former neighbor of the Boy and Dear One
- Walter Long as Musketeer of the Slums
- Tom Wilson as The Kindly Officer/Heart
- Vera Lewis as Miss Mary T. Jenkins
- Sam De Grasse as Mr. Arthur Jenkins, mill boss
- Lloyd Ingraham as The Judge
- Ralph Lewis as The Governor
- A. W. McClure as Prison Father Fathley
- Max Davidson as tenement neighbor of Dear One

=== Renaissance "French" story (1572) ===
- Margery Wilson as Brown Eyes
- Eugene Pallette as Prosper Latour
- Spottiswoode Aitken as Brown Eyes' father
- Ruth Handforth as Brown Eyes' mother
- Allan Sears as The Mercenary Soldier
- Josephine Crowell as Catherine de Medici, the Queen-mother
- Frank Bennett as Charles IX of France
- Maxfield Stanley as Prince Henry of France
- Joseph Henabery as Admiral Coligny
- Constance Talmadge as Princess Marguerite of Valois (first role in film)
- W. E. Lawrence as Henry of Navarre

=== Ancient "Babylonian" story ===
- Constance Talmadge as The Mountain Girl (second role in film)
- Elmer Clifton as The Rhapsode, a warrior-singer
- Alfred Paget as Prince Belshazzar
- Seena Owen as The Princess Beloved, favorite of Belshazzar
- Tully Marshall as High Priest of Bel-Marduk
- George Siegmann as Cyrus the Great
- Carl Stockdale as King Nabonidus, father of Belshazzar
- Elmo Lincoln as The Mighty Man of Valor, guard to Belshazzar
- Frank Brownlee as The Mountain Girl's brother
- The Ruth St. Denis Dancers as Dancing girls

=== The Biblical "Judean" story ===
- Howard Gaye as The Nazarene
- Lillian Langdon as Mary, the Mother
- Bessie Love as The Bride
- George Walsh as The Bridegroom

=== Cameo appearances/small roles ===
- Mary Alden
- Frank Borzage
- Tod Browning (Crook)
- Frank Campeau
- Jewel Carmen
- Constance Collier
- Donald Crisp
- Carol Dempster
- Douglas Fairbanks (drunken soldier with monkey)
- Mildred Harris (Favorite of the harem)
- Dell Henderson
- Harold Lockwood
- Wilfred Lucas
- Francis McDonald
- Owen Moore
- Carmel Myers
- Wallace Reid
- Eve Southern
- Pauline Starke
- Erich von Stroheim (Second Pharisee)
- Madame Sul-Te-Wan
- Natalie Talmadge
- Ethel Grey Terry
- Herbert Beerbohm Tree
- King Vidor
- John P. McCarthy (Prison Guard)

== Production ==
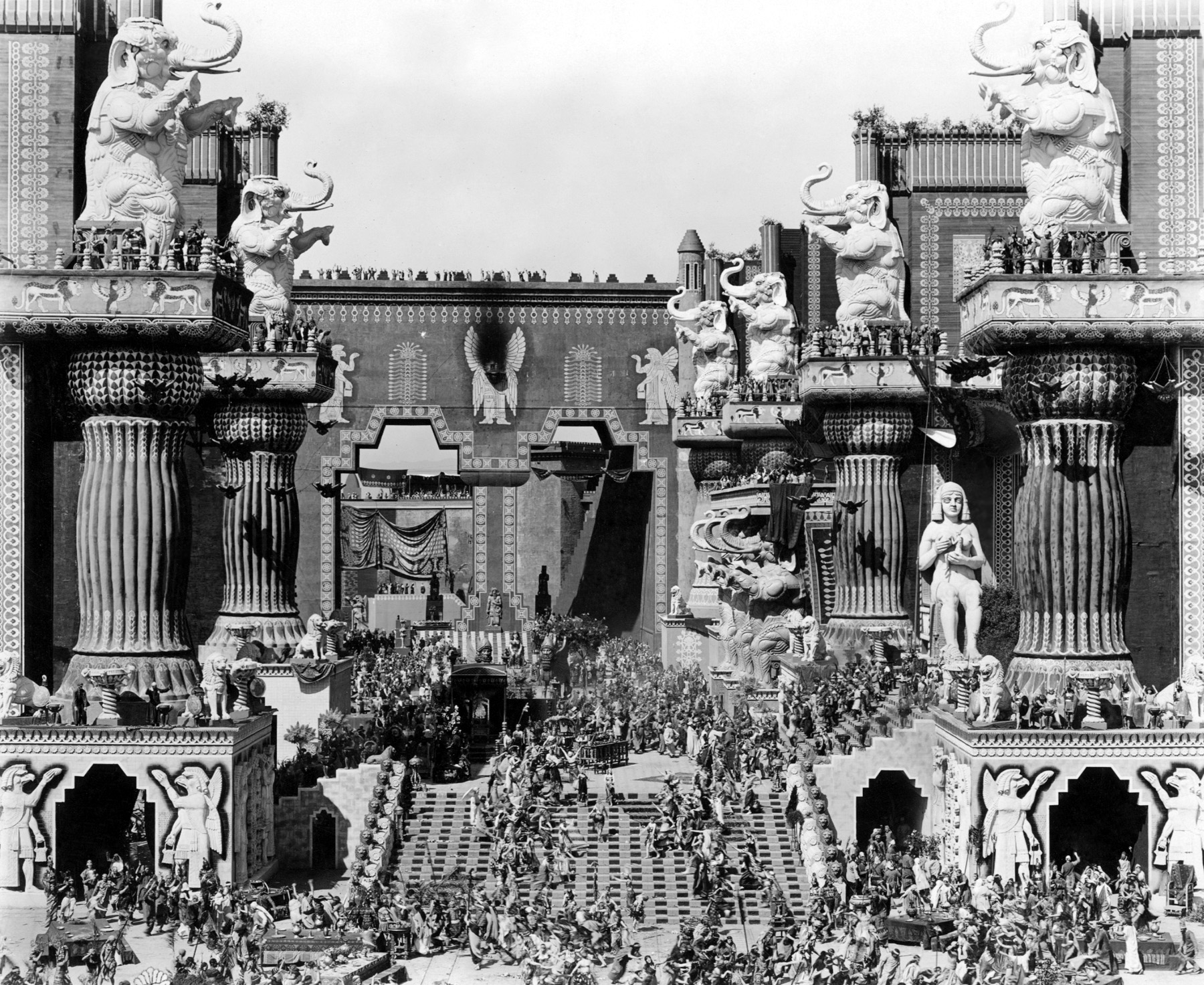
Still of Belshazzar's feast in the central courtyard of Babylon

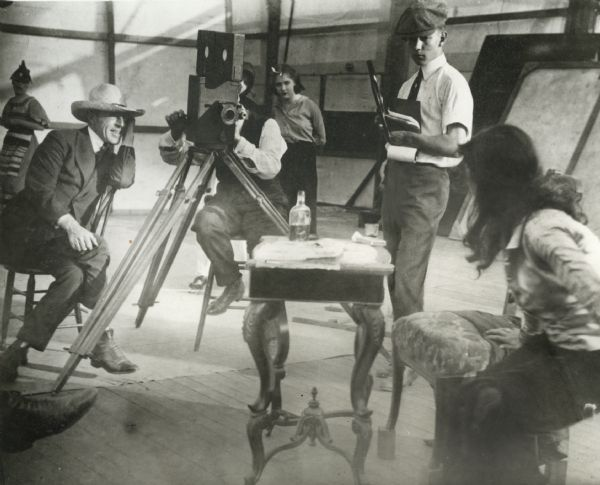
Production image showing (from left) Griffith, cameraman G. W. "Billy" Bitzer behind Pathé camera, Dorothy Gish watching from behind him, Karl Brown holding script, and Miriam Cooper in profile.

Intolerance was a colossal undertaking featuring monumental sets, lavish period costumes, and more than 3,000 extras. The lot on Sunset Boulevard featured a Babylon set with 300-foot (91 m) tall walls as well as streets of Judea and medieval France. The total payroll for extras was reported to have reached $12,000 daily. Griffith began shooting the film with the Modern Story (originally titled "The Mother and the Law"), whose planning predated the great commercial success of The Birth of a Nation. He then greatly expanded it to include the other three parallel stories under the theme of intolerance. Three hundred thousand feet of film were shot.

The total cost of producing Intolerance was reported to be close to $2 million including $250,000 for the Belshazzar feast scene alone, an astronomical sum in 1916, but accounts for the film show the exact cost to be $385,906.77. A third of the budget went into making the Babylonian segments of the film.

The extensive sets constructed for the film were destroyed two years after they were built, and the space would be used for another film.

== Reception ==
Intolerance was met with an enthusiastic reception from film critics upon its premiere. Scholar Frank Beaver argues that "Griffith's intended message in Intolerance was not lost on reviewers", noting that in The San Francisco Bulletin a contemporary critic declared, "Griffith's film comes powerfully to strengthen the hand of the believers in love." Although Intolerance was considered a commercial disappointment upon its initial release, it has since received very positive reviews and later gained popularity. It has been called "the only film fugue". Theodore Huff, one of the leading film critics of the first half of the 20th century, believed that it was the only motion picture worthy of taking its place alongside Beethoven's Symphony No. 5, Michelangelo's Sistine Chapel ceiling paintings, etc., as a separate and central artistic contribution.

Intolerance was shown out of competition at the 1982 Cannes Film Festival. In 1989, it was selected for preservation in the United States National Film Registry by the Library of Congress as being "culturally, historically, or aesthetically significant", the first year of voting. In 2007, AFI's 100 Years ... 100 Movies (10th Anniversary Edition) ranked Intolerance as the 49th best American film of all time. On the review aggregator website Rotten Tomatoes, 98% of 42 critics' reviews are positive, with an average rating of 8.30/10. The website's consensus reads: "A pioneering classic and one of the most influential films ever made, D.W. Griffith's Intolerance stands as the crowning jewel in an incredible filmography." Metacritic, which uses a weighted average, assigned the film a score of 99 out of 100, based on 15 critics, indicating "universal acclaim".

Pauline Kael considered Intolerance the greatest film ever made: "Intolerance is one of the two or three most influential movies ever made, and I think it is also the greatest." Half-a-century later, Armond White concurs, writing, "A century later we are as close to its subject as we are distant from its art."

David Thomson argued that the film's impact is weakened by its "self-destructive frenzy", adding that "The cross-cutting, self-interrupting format is wearisome. [...] The sheer pretension is a roadblock, and one longs for the 'Modern Story' to hold the screen. [...] Anyone concerned with film history has to see Intolerance, and pass on."

The film has been widely reported to have been a box office bomb, but this is a myth attributed to its misreported budget. Even though up to that time it was the most expensive American film made and grossed far less than The Birth of a Nation, it earned approximately $1.75 million for its backers, a respectable performance and enough to recoup its budget.

The film was included by the Vatican in a list of important films compiled in 1995, under the category of "Values".

== Influence ==
Intolerance and its unorthodox editing were enormously influential, particularly among European and Soviet filmmakers. Many of the numerous assistant directors Griffith employed in making the film—Erich von Stroheim, Tod Browning, Woody Van Dyke—went on to become important and noted Hollywood directors in subsequent years.

The film was parodied by Buster Keaton in Three Ages (1923).

In 1954, the San Francisco Museum of Modern Art held a screening of the 1916 film, with organist Vernon Geyer performing the original score.

The 1987 Taviani brothers film Good Morning, Babylon takes place on the set of Intolerance.

Intolerance's "Babylon" set is a feature location in the 2011 video game L.A. Noire, even though the game is set in 1947 and the Babylon set was torn down before this date.

== Versions ==
Intolerance (1916), Thames Silents version

Intolerance is now in the public domain. There are currently four major versions of the film in circulation on home video.

1. The Killiam Shows version – Taken from a third-generation 16 millimeter print, this version contains an organ score by Gaylord Carter. Running approximately 176 minutes, it is the version that has been the most widely seen in recent years. It has been released on LaserDisc and DVD by Image Entertainment and is the most complete version currently available on home video, if not the longest.
2. The official Thames Silents restoration – In 1989 this film was given a formal restoration by film preservationists Kevin Brownlow and David Gill of Photoplay Productions in association with Thames Television. This version, also running 177 minutes, was prepared from original 35 millimeter material, some of which came from the Rohauer Collection, who had claimed copyright in the film. Its tones and tints were restored per Griffith's original intent, and it has a digitally recorded orchestral score by Carl Davis. It was released the same year on VHS in the US by HBO Video, then went out of print. It was given a further digital restoration by Cohen Media Group (which currently owns the Rohauer library), and was reissued to select theatres, as well as on DVD and Blu-ray, in 2013. It is distributed under the Masters of Cinema label in the UK. While not as complete as the Killiam Shows version, this print contains footage not found on that particular print.
3. The Kino version – Pieced together in 2002 by Kino International, this version, taken from 35 millimeter material, is transferred at a slower frame rate than the Killiam Shows and Rohauer prints, resulting in a longer running time of 197 minutes. It contains a synthetic orchestral score by Joseph Turrin. An alternative "happy ending" to the "Fall of Babylon" sequence, showing the Mountain Girl surviving and re-united with the Rhapsode, is included on the DVD as a supplement. Despite the longer runtime, this version is less complete than the Killiam Shows and Rohauer prints.
4. The restored digital cinema version – Restoration conducted by ZZ Productions in collaboration with the Danish Film Institute and Arte France of the version shown at the Theatre Royal, Drury Lane in London on April 7, 1917. This version runs approximately 177 minutes, and premiered at the Venice Film Festival on August 29, 2007, and on arte on October 4, 2007.

A further extensive 1989 restoration was a collaboration between silent film composer-conductor Gillian Anderson, the Museum of Modern Art, and the Library of Congress. It is somewhat controversial but perhaps the most accurate to date; however, it is unavailable on home video.

There are other budget/public domain video and DVD versions of this film released by different companies, each with varying degrees of picture quality depending on the source that was used. Most are of poor picture quality, but even the restored 35 millimeter versions exhibit considerable film damage.

The Internet Movie Database lists the standard running time as 163 minutes, which is the running length of the DVD released by "Public Domain Flicks". The Delta DVD released in Region 1 as Intolerance: A Sun Play of the Ages and in Region 2 as Intolerance: Love's Struggle Throughout the Ages clocks in at 167 minutes. The version available for free viewing on the Internet Movie Archive is the Killiam restoration.

Cameraman Karl Brown remembered a scene with the various members of the Babylonian harem that featured full frontal nudity. He was barred from the set that day, apparently because he was so young. While there are several shots of slaves and harem girls throughout the film (which were shot by another director without Griffith's involvement), the scene that Brown describes is not in any surviving versions.

It is also known that a major segment of the Renaissance "French" story, involving the attempted assassination of the Admiral Coligny, was cut before the film's release.

Film historian Kevin Brownlow has written that, when Griffith re-released "The Modern Story" separately as The Mother and the Law in 1919, he softened the actions of the National Guard in the film, due to the First Red Scare that year. "He was obliged to put this title in the strike sequence: 'The militiamen having used blank cartridges, the workmen now fear only the company guards.'" In fact, "machine guns could not operate with blank cartridges at this period", Brownlow noted.

== See also ==
- Intolerance Babylon set
