= Secret Affair =

British musical group

- Origin: London, England
- Genres: Mod revival, power pop, soul
- Years active: 1979–1982, 2002–present
- Label: I-Spy
- Members: David Cairns
- Past members: Dave Winthrop; Dennis Smith; Seb Shelton; Paul Bultitude; Simon Hanson; Ian Page
- Website: www.secretaffair.info

Secret Affair are a mod revival band, formed in 1978 and disbanded in 1982 during which period their work is predominantly best-known. They reformed in 2002 and have since then produced an album in 2012.

== Career ==
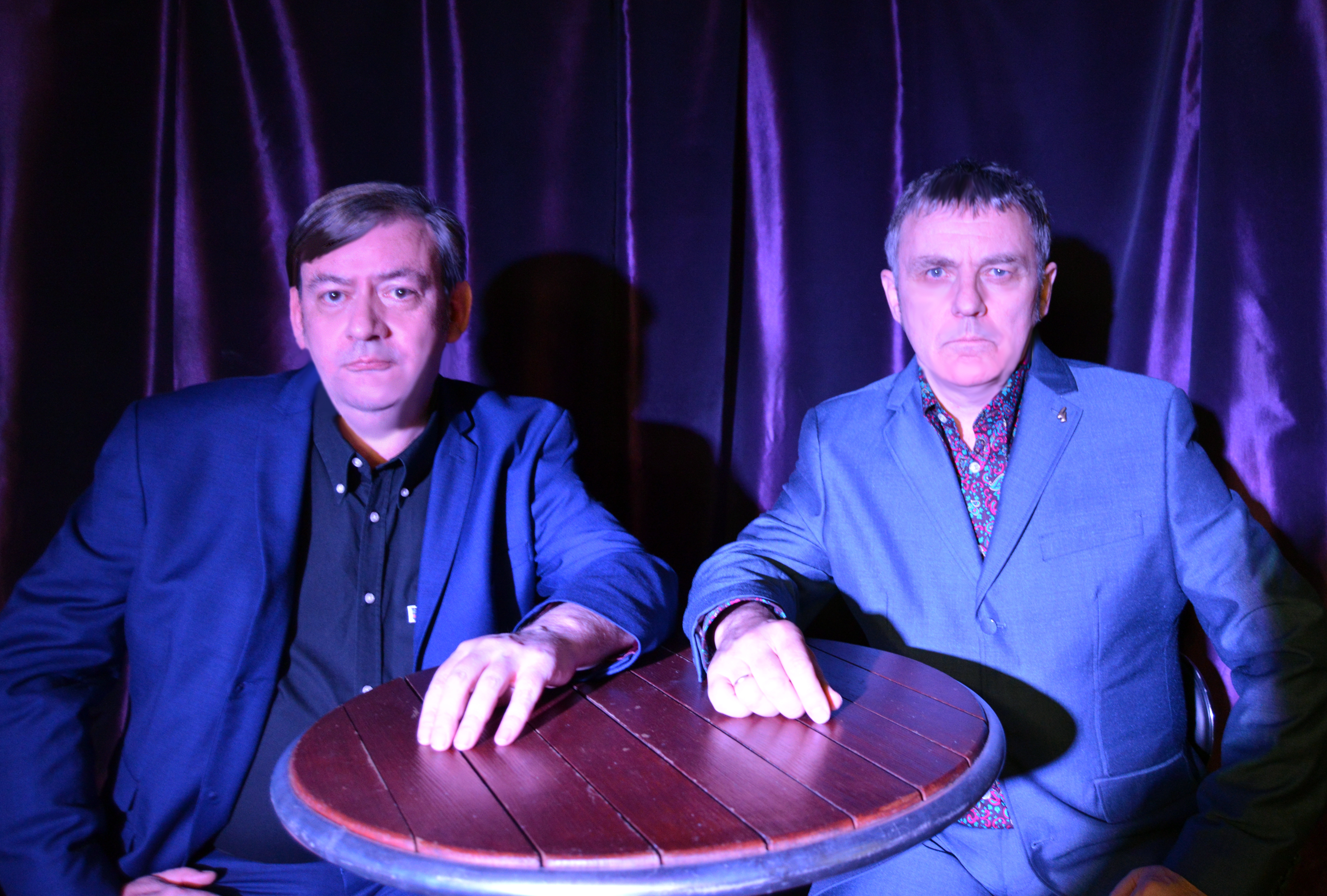
Ian Page and David Cairns from Secret Affair

Formed after the demise of the CBS Records signed power pop band New Hearts, singer Ian Page and guitarist David Cairns spent the second half of 1978 writing songs that would form the basis of the first two Secret Affair albums.

After spending January 1979 demoing songs, Page and Cairns enlisted the services of bassist Dennis Smith from the power pop band Advertising and Young Bucks drummer Seb Shelton. Saxophone player Dave Winthrop, originally playing with the group in his capacity as a session musician, would join as a full-time member of the band later in the year.

After the demise of the group in 1982, Cairns went on to form a band called Flag, with Archie Brown from The Bureau and signed a recording contract in the US. He subsequently teamed up with Scottish singer Alan King in Walk on Fire, writing the majority of the band's material and playing keyboards on tours. Signing to MCA in the US, the band released the album Blind Faith in 1990 and toured supporting Foreigner, Nils Lofgren and Dan Reed Network, before Cairns joined Gibson Guitars USA as Special Projects and Events manager. Page released two solo singles before leaving the music industry. Having departed the band in late 1980, drummer Seb Shelton joined Kevin Rowland's Dexys Midnight Runners and enjoyed success with them between 1980 and 1982.

== Reunion ==
In June 2002, Page, Cairns, Smith and Winthrop, with drummer Paul Bultitude, reunited for three gigs, including a performance at London's Shepherd's Bush Empire. They returned in June the following year, playing at The Scala in Islington to promote the release of Time For Action: The Anthology (Sanctuary), a major CD retrospective of hits, rarities and previously unreleased tracks. The concert was filmed and released on DVD.

In 2006, Page and Cairns attempted to mend their sometimes fractious relationship and started work on a fourth Secret Affair album, recording five new songs for Peer Music. The album remains unfinished, but in 2010 Captain Mod Records released Secret Affair, The Singles Collection which featured two of the Peer Music tracks, "Soho Dreams" and "Land of Hope".

Page and Cairns reformed Secret Affair as a touring band with a new line-up. In 2009 they played regularly around the UK and further afield, having played their first ever concerts in Dublin, Madrid, Moscow and Tokyo.

In July 2011, Secret Affair re-recorded "Time For Action" for Save The Children. The latter spearheaded their campaign for health workers in poor countries, and over 42,000 people signed the petition in the UK which was taken to David Cameron in September 2011, resulting in funds for the cause endorsed and approved by the United Nations.

On 5 December 2011, Dave Cairns appeared as a guest on BBC Two programme, Never Mind The Buzzcocks.

Secret Affair released their fourth studio album, Soho Dreams after an absence of 30 years on their label, I-SPY Records, on 10 September 2012, distributed by Code7/Plastic Head and supported by a 13-date UK tour ending at The 229 Club, London, on 24 November. The band continue to tour throughout 2013 and perform their end of year show at the Islington Assembly Hall, 7 December.

On 5 September 2014, Secret Affair begin their '35th Anniversary Tour' of the UK in Gloucester at the Guildhall, followed by Stockton on Tees and ending in Manchester at the Band on the Wall venue, on 13 December 2014, celebrating the 1979 release of their debut album, Glory Boys. In November that year, Sony/BMG/Captain Mod Records released Est 1979; The Secret Affair 35th Anniversary Box Set featuring all four albums from 1979 to the present day. In August 2016, I-SPY Records released Secret Affair's cover of the Northern soul classic "Do I Love You (Indeed I Do)" on 7-inch vinyl only. In September that year the band appeared on Vintage TV, episode 28, performing live in concert three tracks, "Do I Love You' (Indeed I Do)", "I Don't Need No Doctor" and "My World".

Secret Affair celebrated their 40th anniversary in 2019 with a 14 date UK tour. In September 2025, Ian Page retired from the band leaving Dave Cairns,founder member and writer of the hit singles, 'Time For Action', 'My World' and 'Sound of Confusion' to continue touring the band in 2026. The band's long-time trombone player Steve Rinaldi (also frontman of the band Rinaldi Sings) took over as Secret Affair's lead vocalist.

== Band members ==
=== Current members ===
- David Cairns – guitars (1979–1982, 2002–present)

=== Former members ===
- Dave Winthrop – saxophone (1979–1982, 2002–2008)
- Dennis Smith – bass (1979–1982, 2002–2003)
- Chris Bennett – drums (1979)
- Seb Shelton – drums (1979–1980)
- Paul Bultitude – drums (1980–1982, 2002–2003)
- Simon Hanson – drums (2012, 5 tracks on the 'Soho Dreams' album)
- Ian Page – 1979-2025

=== Current touring musicians ===
- Steve Rinaldi – vocals & trombone (2006–present)
- Russ Baxter – drums (2008–present)
- Ed Pearson – bass (2011–present)
- Garry Walsh - Keyboards
- John O'Neill – saxophone (2015–present)
- Tim Pannell – trumpet (2012–present)

=== Former touring musicians ===
- Andy Brush – saxophone (2008–2012)
- Martyn Blagden – trumpet (2008–2012)
- Sean Kelly – bass (2008–2011)
- Bryn Barkham – hammond organ (2009–2011)
- Stephen Wilcock – saxophone (2012–2015)
- Andy Fairclough – hammond organ (2011–2016)

== Discography ==
=== Albums ===
==== Studio albums ====
- Glory Boys (1979) – UK #41
- Behind Closed Doors (1980) – UK #48
- Business as Usual (1982) – UK #84
- Soho Dreams (2012)

==== Live albums ====
- Live at the Bridge (1999)
- Time for Action (2012)
- Time for Action - Live red vinyl (2022)

==== Compilation albums ====
- Time for Action – The Very Best Of (1997)
- Time for Action – The Anthology (2003)
- Mod Singles Collection (2010)
- 35th Anniversary Box Set (2014)

=== Singles ===
Year	Single	Peak chart positions		Album
Year	Single	IRE	UK	Album
1979	"Time for Action"	13	13	Glory Boys
1979	"Let Your Heart Dance"	—	32	Glory Boys
1980	"My World"	—	16	Behind Closed Doors
1980	"Sound of Confusion"	—	45	Behind Closed Doors
1981	"Do You Know"	—	57	Business as Usual
1982	"Lost in the Night (Mack the Knife)"	—	—	Business as Usual
2013	"All the Rage" (Promo release)	—	—	Soho Dreams
2016	"Do I Love You (Indeed I Do)" (Limited release)	—	—	Non-album single
"—" denotes releases that did not chart or were not released

== See also ==
- List of bands from England
- List of performances on Top of the Pops
- List of Peel sessions
- Captain Oi! Records
- Rock Goes To College

== Other sources ==
- Sleevenotes to the CD reissues of Glory Boys, Behind Closed Door and Business As Usual, by Chris Hunt
