= Eli Oberstein =

American record producer and music business executive (1901–1960)

- Born: Elias Oberstein; December 13, 1901; New York City, United States
- Died: June 12, 1960 (aged 58); Westport, Connecticut, US
- Other name: Elliott Everett Oberstein
- Occupations: Music executive, record label owner
- Years active: c.1925–1960
- Known for: Founder of Bluebird Records and other labels
- Children: Maurice Oberstein

Elliott Everett "Eli" Oberstein (born Elias Oberstein; December 13, 1901 – June 12, 1960) was an American record producer and music business executive who established the influential Bluebird record label in the 1930s and owned a succession of small labels in the 1940s and 1950s.

== Life and career ==
He was born Elias Oberstein in New York City, the son of Ella and Morris Oberstein, a police officer of Russian Jewish descent, and grew up in the Bronx. By 1920, he was working as a clothing salesman.

== Career in record business ==
Oberstein became a salesman under Ralph Peer at Okeh Records. In 1928, after Peer had joined the rival Victor Records, Oberstein joined him there as a salesman and accountant.

By 1930, he began overseeing recording sessions and set up his own company, Crown Records. After Peer left RCA Victor in 1932, Oberstein began recording country musicians in the Southern United States.

He is credited with establishing the Bluebird record label in the early 1930s, as a 35-cent low priced subsidiary of Victor. The label became successful during the Depression era, and established the reputations of many country and blues musicians including The Delmore Brothers, Ernest Tubb, Big Bill Broonzy, and Roosevelt Sykes. In 1936, he became head of popular Artist & Repertoire at RCA Victor. He signed Benny Goodman and Tommy Dorsey to RCA Victor, also adding Glenn Miller and Artie Shaw to the roster at Bluebird. As a record producer, Oberstein pioneered the practice of making deals with songwriters, music publishers and others, which eventually developed into what became known as "payola". In 1939, he was abruptly fired with no explanation by RCA Victor.

His Crown record company soon went bankrupt, and he set up new labels including Royale and Varsity, based in Scranton, Pennsylvania; however, none of the leading musicians he had produced followed him, and the labels again folded. Oberstein then set up the Imperial Record Company, with the Elite label subsidiary. He recorded Bunny Berigan's final sessions, and began acquiring smaller companies and exchanging masters with Savoy Records. He circumvented the 1942-43 "Petrillo Ban", which stopped recordings being made by union members in the US, by making and distributing recordings that he claimed had been made in Mexico. He also reissued many older recordings made for labels such as Crown, Gennett and Paramount; the legality of his business methods in acquiring and re-selling the recordings sometimes came into question. With bandleader Johnny Messner, he set up the Top Hat record label which specialised in risqué double entendre "party" records. Oberstein also established the Hit record label, which found chart success with Louis Prima's "Angelina" in 1944.

Oberstein was described as "a colorful wheeler-dealer". In 1945, he sold his recording studio, pressing plant and master recordings to the Majestic Radio & Television Corporation, and helped them set up the Majestic Records label of the same name. He was briefly re-hired by RCA Victor before he was again fired, and then relaunched his Varsity label. In 1948, he bought back the rights to the Majestic label, which had been sold to Mercury Records, and, after a period with Columbia Records, he acquired the rights to the Allegro classical music label in the early 1950s. He set up the Royale label through which he sold acquired recordings at budget prices.

He and Ervin Litkei bought the Rondo label in the mid-1950s. They based the label in Union City, New Jersey, as part of their group of companies which they called "Record Corporation of America" in the apparent hope that clients and customers would confuse it with the much larger RCA (Radio Corporation of America) Victor company. Later in the decade he sold many of his interests to the Pickwick International record company, while retaining his control of the Rondo label. His short-lived United States Record Corporation launched in May 1939 and was bankrupt by 1940. The business was accused of receiving financial backing from a jukebox owning syndicate that controlled around 150,000 of the pay-for-play record playing machines causing large music publishers concerned over royalty collection.

He died in Westport, Connecticut, in 1960, aged 58.

== Family ==
His only child, Maurice "Obie" Oberstein (1928 – 2001) sold the Rondo label shortly after his father's death. He then worked for Columbia Records, where he was responsible for setting up the CBS imprint for producing and distributing the company's recordings in the UK. He later became chairman of Polygram UK, and twice chairman of the British Phonographic Industry (BPI).
