= José Álamo =

Spanish footballer (1903–1940)

Personal information
- Full name: José Álamo Delgado
- Date of birth: 5 December 1903
- Place of birth: Las Palmas, Spain
- Date of death: 20 April 1940 (aged 36)
- Place of death: Las Palmas, Spain
- Position: Forward

Senior career*
Years	Team	Apps	(Gls)
1925–1929	Real Club Victoria		
1929–1930	Espanyol	9	(2)
1930–1931	Real Oviedo	17	(7)

International career
1930	Catalonia	1	(0)
- * Club domestic league appearances and goals

José Álamo Delgado (5 December 1903 – 20 April 1940) was a Spanish footballer who played as a forward for Espanyol and Real Oviedo. He was also international with the Catalan national team on one occasion in 1930.

== Club career ==
Born on 5 December 1903 in Las Palmas, Canary Islands, Álamo began his career in his hometown club Real Club Victoria in 1925. In 1929, Espanyol paid 25,000 pesetas for his services and those of Manuel Espino. Álamo only stayed in Espanyol for one season, playing nine La Liga matches and scoring two goals, the second of which in a famous 8–1 trashing of Real Madrid on 5 March 1930.

Despite having a wonderful pass, Álamo failed to adapt to Espanyol's sporting environment due to "homesickness", missing his warm island homeland, so he returned to Las Palmas at the end of the 1929–30 season before leaving again in October with the intention of returning to Espanyol. When asked about his return, he stated that he had not neglected training in the Canary Islands, and also that he was "lighter and willing to shoot more to undo my legend of shooting poverty". The journalist of this interview noted that "Álamo never stops taking out packs and packs of Canarian cigarettes from the pockets of his trench coat, his jacket, even his shirt!".

Despite his desire to play, Álamo was unable to rejoin Espanyol and ended up at Real Oviedo, where he again only played for one season (1930–31), scoring 7 goals in 16 official matches.

== International career ==
As a Espanyol player, Álamo was eligible to play for the Catalan national team, making his debut against Real Zaragoza on 22 June 1930, in a tribute match to Rini in Zaragoza, in which he scored his side's only goal in a 3–1 loss.

== Later life and death ==
Álamo died on 20 April 1940, at the age of 36.
