= New Hearts =

British new wave band

- Origin: London, England
- Genres: New wave
- Years active: 1977–1978
- Labels: CBS; Cherry Red
- Past members: Ian Page; David Cairns; John Harty; Rob Milne

New Hearts were a British new wave band from London, England, active in 1977-78.

== Biography ==
New Hearts evolved out of the college band Splitz Kidz, who met in Loughton and consisted of Ian Page (vocals), David Cairns (guitar), John Harty (bass guitar) and drummer Rob Milne (who later drummed with the Clash on the Anarchy in The UK tour). Renaming themselves New Hearts, they were signed by CBS Records at the height of punk rock just two months after their debut gig and with an average age of just 17, directly by CBS' managing director, Maurice Oberstein, who had taken a personal interest in the band and attended eight gigs in a row. They appeared on the opening day of the 1978 Reading Rock Festival alongside the Jam, Ultravox and Sham 69.

New Hearts recorded two singles for CBS, "(Just Another) Teenage Anthem" and the Martin Gordon-produced "Plain Jane", inspired by acts like Dr. Feelgood and Eddie & the Hot Rods. They also supported the Jam during their lengthy UK Modern World tour, and accompanied them at the 1978 Reading Festival, where they were joined on stage by Hawkwind's guitarist, Huw Lloyd Langton. Disillusioned, Page and Cairns ended New Hearts and set about creating a new band inspired by the dress code and musical stylings of the 1960s mod movement.

Members of the group formed another group named Secret Affair, and released "Time for Action" as a single in 1979.

In October 2009, a new CD containing 23 songs (20 for CBS and three pre-CBS demos) was issued by Cherry Red Records.

== Discography ==
=== Singles ===
- "(Just Another) Teenage Anthem" / "Blood on the Knife" (CBS, November 1977)
- "Plain Jane" / "My Young Teacher" (CBS, June 1978)

=== Retrospective CD ===
- A Secret Affair (Cherry Red Records, October 2009)
