= Rufina Alamo =

Spanish-American polymer scientist (born 1954)

Rufina G. Álamo Matesanz
- Born: 1954 (age 71–72); Segovia, Spain
- Education: University of Valladolid, Spanish National Research Council, Complutense University of Madrid

Rufina G. Álamo Matesanz (born in 1954) is a Spanish-American polymer scientist known particularly for her research on polyethylene and polypropylene and on sustainable polymers such as polyoxymethylene made from biomass. She is Simon Ostrach Professor of Engineering and distinguished research professor of chemical and biomedical engineering in the Florida A&M University – Florida State University College of Engineering.

== Education and career ==
Alamo was born in 1954 in Segovia. She earned a bachelor's degree in chemistry from the University of Valladolid in 1977, and a master's in 1978, at the same time earning a postgraduate diploma from the Rubber and Plastics Institute of the Spanish National Research Council. She completed her Ph.D. in chemistry in 1981, at the Complutense University of Madrid.

After postdoctoral research with the Spanish National Research Council and then at Florida State University, she began working in industry as a researcher for the Dow Chemical Company in Spain in 1985. In 1988 she returned to Florida State University as a researcher, and in 1995 she obtained a faculty position as associate professor in the FAMU–FSU College of Engineering. She was promoted to full professor in 2003 and named the Simon Ostrach Professor of Engineering and distinguished research professor in 2013.

== Recognition ==
Alamo was named a Fellow of the American Physical Society (APS) in 2012, after a nomination from the APS Division of Polymer Science, "for her use of well-characterized materials and performance of carefully designed experiments to address structure-property relationships in polyolefins".

== Selected publications ==
Alamo's research publications include:

- Alamo, Rufina; Domszy, Roman; Mandelkern, Leo (December 1984), "Thermodynamic and structural properties of copolymers of ethylene", The Journal of Physical Chemistry, 88 (26): 6587–6595, Bibcode:1984JPhCh..88.6587A, doi:10.1021/j150670a022
- Alamo, Rufina G.; VanderHart, D. L.; Nyden, Marc R.; Mandelkern, L. (July 2000), "Morphological partitioning of ethylene defects in random propylene-ethylene copolymers", Macromolecules, 33 (16): 6094–6105, doi:10.1021/ma000267i
- Hosier, I. L.; Alamo, R. G.; Esteso, P.; Isasi, J. R.; Mandelkern, L. (July 2003), "Formation of the α and γ polymorphs in random metallocene-propylene copolymers: Effect of concentration and type of comonomer", Macromolecules, 36 (15): 5623–5636, Bibcode:2003MaMol..36.5623H, doi:10.1021/ma030157m
- Jeon, Keesu; Lumata, Lloyd; Tokumoto, Takahisa; Steven, Eden; Brooks, James; Alamo, Rufina G. (July 2007), "Low electrical conductivity threshold and crystalline morphology of single-walled carbon nanotubes – high density polyethylene nanocomposites characterized by SEM, Raman spectroscopy and AFM", Polymer, 48 (16): 4751–4764, doi:10.1016/j.polymer.2007.05.078
- Alamo, R. G.; Jeon, K.; Smith, R. L.; Boz, E.; Wagener, K. B.; Bockstaller, M. R. (September 2008), "Crystallization of Polyethylenes Containing Chlorines: Precise vs Random Placement", Macromolecules, 41 (19): 7141–7151, Bibcode:2008MaMol..41.7141A, doi:10.1021/ma801152p
