= Alamos =

Alamos or Álamos may refer to:

- Álamos, Sonora, Mexico
- The plural form of The Alamo
- Alamos Gold, a Canadian gold mining company
- Álamos (Mexico City Metrobús)
- Álamos F.C., a football team

== People with the surname ==
- Damien Alamos (born 1990), French kickboxer
- Julio Álamos (born 1991), Chilean boxer

== See also ==
- Los Alamos (disambiguation)
