= Michael Casswell =

English session guitarist

Michael John Casswell (18 June 1963 – 30 September 2016) was an English session guitarist, who toured and recorded with numerous artists including Brian May, Joe Bonamassa, Steve Hackett, Wang Chung, Ronan Keating, Rose Royce, Cozy Powell, Tony Hadley, Go West, Dean Friedman, Limahl (Kajagoogoo), Rhinos Revenge Band, Fanfields (Toto tribute project) and Marcus Malone.

== Career ==
Casswell started playing the guitar from the age of 11. In the mid-1980s he was signed to RCA USA as a part of a band called Heroes. From the late 1980s to the early 1990s he was signed to MCA UK with the British rock band Walk on Fire, which released an album Blind Faith in 1989. In 1992, he joined the Brian May Band for the South America tour. Casswell co-wrote and co-produced Cozy Powell's last solo album, Especially for You, which was released by Polygram Records in 1998. From 2006 to 2008, Casswell played in the West End Queen musical, We Will Rock You. Casswell also taught guitar through many DVDs from Lick Library with an emphatic focus on classic rock and blues styles. Since 2011, he was regularly contributing to the Guitar Interactive magazine with columns, gear reviews and interviews.

In 2014, Casswell released a solo album entitled Complaints about the Noise. Casswell's last recordings were his submissions for the Toto tribute Fanfields project, which were released on October 1, 2016, a day after his death.

== Equipment and style ==
Casswell was a keen user of the guitar's tremolo bar. He was often seen playing pre-Samick Valley Arts guitars, equipped with Floyd Rose and EMG pickups. He also frequently played a Music Man (Luke) guitar, as well as various Fender Stratocasters and James Tyler guitars. For amplifiers, he mainly used Mesa-Boogie, or Marshall Amplification.

== Death ==
In September 2016, Casswell drowned whilst swimming off Las Negras beach in the Cabo de Gata-Níjar Natural Park in Níjar, Spain. He was 53 years old.

== Discography ==
Solo

- Complaints about the Noise (2014)
