= Bluebird Records =

American record label; imprint of RCA Victor

- Parent company: Sony Music Entertainment
- Founded: 1932; 94 years ago
- Founder: Eli Oberstein
- Distributor: Sony Masterworks
- Genre: Blues, jazz, children's music
- Country of origin: U.S.
- Location: Camden, New Jersey, New York City, Chicago, Illinois

Bluebird Records is an American record label best known for its low-cost releases, primarily of children's music, blues, jazz and swing in the 1930s and 1940s. Bluebird was founded in 1932 as a lower-priced subsidiary label of RCA Victor. Bluebird was noted for what came to be known as the "Bluebird sound", which influenced rhythm and blues and early rock and roll. It is currently owned by RCA Records parent company Sony Music Entertainment.

== History ==
The label was founded in 1932 as a division of RCA Victor by Eli Oberstein, an executive at the company. Bluebird competed with other budget labels at the time. Records were made quickly and cheaply. The "Bluebird sound" came from the session band that was used on many recordings to cut costs. The band included musicians such as Big Bill Broonzy, Roosevelt Sykes, Washboard Sam, and Sonny Boy Williamson. Many blues musicians were signed to RCA Victor and Bluebird by Lester Melrose, a talent scout and producer who had a virtual monopoly on the Chicago blues market. In these years, the Bluebird label became the home of Chicago blues.

Bluebird recorded and reissued jazz and big band music. Its roster included Ted Weems, Rudy Vallée, Joe Haymes, Artie Shaw, Glenn Miller, Shep Fields, and Earl Hines. During World War II, Victor reissued records by Duke Ellington, Jelly Roll Morton, and Bennie Moten. Bluebird's roster for country music included the Monroe Brothers, the Delmore Brothers, Bradley Kincaid. It reissued many titles by Jimmie Rodgers and the Carter Family.

After World War II, the Bluebird label was retired and its previously released titles were reissued on the standard RCA Victor label. In the 1950s, RCA Victor revived Bluebird for certain budget recordings, jazz releases and reissues, children's records, and the low-priced RCA Victor Bluebird Classics series. The Bluebird name was retired again during the 1960s, and certain recordings issued under the Bluebird imprint during the 1950s were reissued on the standard RCA Victor label or the budget-priced RCA Camden label. In the mid-1970s, RCA revived the Bluebird label again, for a series of 2-LP sets of big band, swing and jazz reissues produced by Ethel Gabriel and Frank Driggs. Currently, the Bluebird label is used for CD reissues of certain jazz and pop titles originally issued on the RCA Victor label.

== Labels and discs ==
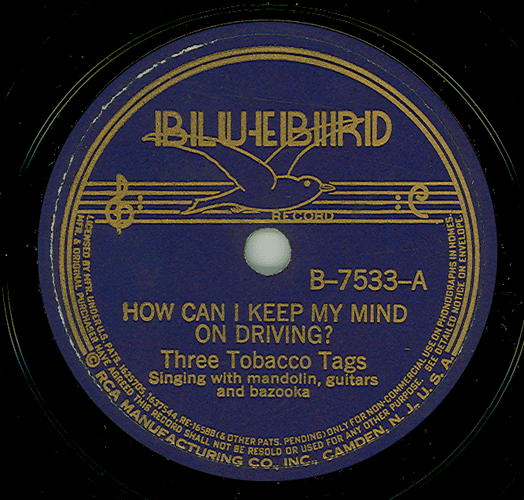
A Bluebird Record, 1938

RCA Victor's entry into the budget market was the 35¢ Timely Tunes, sold through Montgomery Ward retail stores. 40 issues appeared from April to July 1931 before the label was discontinued.

The first Bluebird records appeared in July 1932 along with identically numbered Electradisk records. Test-marketed at selected Woolworth's stores in New York City, these 8-inch discs are so rare today that copies of certain titles may no longer exist at all. The records may have sold for as little as 10¢ each. Bluebird records bore a black-on-medium blue label, Electradisks a blue-on-orange label.

The 8-inch series ran from 1800 to 1809, but both labels reappeared later in 1932 as 10-inch discs: Bluebird 1820–1853, continuing to April 1933, and Electradisk 2500–2509 and 1900–2177, continuing to January 1934.

Electradisks in the 2500 block were dance-band sides recorded on two days in June 1932. These rare issues were given Victor matrix numbers, but the four-digit matrix numbers on the 78 look more like those found on discs from Crown Records, an independent label that had its own studios, though its products were pressed by Victor. The few records in that block that have been seen resemble Crowns, leading to speculation that all were recorded at Crown. The 2500 series may also have been for sale only in New York City.

In May 1933, RCA Victor revived Bluebird as a 35¢ (3 for $1) general-interest budget record, numbered B-5000 and up, with a new blue-on-beige label (often referred as the "buff" Bluebird, used until 1937 in the US and 1939 in Canada). Most 1800-series material was immediately reissued on the buff label; afterwards it ran concurrently with the Electradisk series (made for Woolworth's).

Another short-lived concurrent label was Sunrise, which may have been made for sale by artists or "mom & pop" stores. Few Sunrise records and essentially no information on the label, survive today. In early 1934, Sunrise and Electradisk were discontinued, leaving Bluebird as the only RCA Victor budget-priced label until RCA Camden was launched in 1953. RCA Victor also issued Bluebird titles on the Montgomery Ward label, sold exclusively by the Ward stores.

== Notable artists ==
- Charlie Barnet
- Big Bill Broonzy
- Willie Bryant
- Bo Carter
- Wilf Carter
- Cedar Creek Sheik
- Virgil Childers
- Arthur Crudup
- Billy Daniels
- Sam Donahue
- Shep Fields
- Harry Gozzard
- Lil Green
- George Hall
- Lionel Hampton
- Joe Haymes
- Fletcher Henderson
- Earl Hines
- Dan Hornsby
- The Ink Spots
- Curtis Jones
- Spike Jones
- The King Sisters
- Sonny Boy Williamson I
- Ted Weems
- Vincent Lopez
- Bert Lown
- J. E. Mainer
- Wingy Manone
- Tommy McClennan
- Big Maceo Merriweather
- Glenn Miller
- Mississippi Matilda
- Vaughn Monroe
- Ozzie Nelson
- Sonny Boy Nelson
- Robert Petway
- Jimmie Rodgers
- Tampa Red
- John Serry Sr.
- Artie Shaw
- Dinah Shore
- Frank Sinatra
- Ruby Smith
- Roosevelt Sykes
- Rudy Vallee
- Washboard Sam
- Cy Walter

== See also ==
- List of record labels
