= David Cairns (musician) =

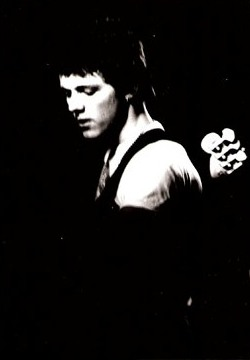
- Cairns in 1978

Background information
- Birth name: David Anthony Cairns
- Born: 15 November 1958 (age 66); Walthamstow, London, England
- Genres: Power pop, mod revival, rock
- Instrument(s): Guitar, keyboards
- Years active: 1976-present
- Labels: I-Spy, CBS, MCA, Scotti Bros.
- Member of: Secret Affair
- Formerly of: New Hearts
- Website: www.secretaffair.info

David Cairns (born 15 November 1958) is an English rock guitarist and songwriter, best known for his role in the band Secret Affair. The writer of the band's biggest hits, he was known for his intense guitar style.

== Background and early career ==
The son of an Epping Forest GP, Dr Richard James Cairns MBE, David Cairns was first inspired to take up the guitar after an encounter at a local nightclub with BBC Radio 1 DJ John Peel, who recommended the teenager listen to a Lynyrd Skynyrd album. He was also inspired by a live performance by The Who at Charlton Athletic's football ground in 1976 and while at sixth form teamed up with singer Ian Page, forming power pop/punk band New Hearts. The band signed to CBS Records in 1977, releasing two singles and touring with The Jam, before being released from their recording contract in mid-1978, although their unreleased album New Hearts, A Secret Affair, The CBS Sessions was finally released on Cherry Red Records, October 2009.

== Secret Affair ==
After the demise of the New Hearts, Cairns continued to work with Page, forming Secret Affair. The two songwriters spent the second half of 1978 writing songs that would form the basis of the first two Secret Affair albums. In a period of a little over two years, the band posted five releases in the UK Singles Chart, and released three albums. The debut single "Time For Action" sold 198,000 copies and reached number 13 in the UK chart in 1979, putting them at the forefront of the mod revival movement. More chart success followed with "Let Your Heart Dance", "My World" and "Sound Of Confusion". Although Cairns and Page would often write together, three of the band's biggest chart hits ("Time For Action", "My World" and "Sound Of Confusion") were written by Cairns alone.

== First Secret Affair reunion ==
After the split of Secret Affair in 1982, Cairns formed The Flag with singer Archie Brown, signing to Scotti Brothers Records/CBS in the U.S. Relocating to Los Angeles for a year, the band toured supporting A Flock of Seagulls and released the USA only album, Flag which featured Dave Ruffy on drums (The Ruts), Nathan East on bass (Eric Clapton Band) and John Van Tongeren on keyboards.

Cairns subsequently teamed up with Scottish singer Alan King in Walk on Fire, writing the majority of the band's material and playing keyboards on their live tours. Signing to MCA in the US, and managed by Bill Curbishley of The Who and Plant/Page fame, they released the album Blind Faith in 1990 and toured supporting Foreigner, Nils Lofgren, and the Dan Reed Network. In 1992 he moved away from playing and joined Gibson Guitars as Special Projects & Events manager, promoting major Gibson shows around the world; in particular UK charity events promoted by Harvey Goldsmith in aid of The Prince's Trust, and developing new custom guitar models for artists such as Jimmy Page and Noel Gallagher before leaving the company in 2000 having managed Gibson's London, Orlando and Memphis offices to join Peugeot as an events manager (in particular the 207 car launch) and later Toyota and Ford.

== Second Secret Affair reunion ==
In 2002 he once again teamed up with Page to reform Secret Affair, initially for three concerts in the UK, including a performance at London's Shepherd's Bush Empire. They returned in June the following year, playing at The Scala in London to promote the release of Time For Action: The Anthology (Sanctuary), a major CD retrospective of hits, rarities and previously unreleased tracks. The concert was filmed and released on DVD.

In 2005 Page and Cairns attempted to mend their sometimes fractious relationship and started work on a fourth Secret Affair album, recording five new songs. The album remains unfinished and unreleased as of July 2008. In the meantime Cairns has started to make occasional solo appearances, playing at the 2006 and 2007 Small Faces Conventions and playing at charity events in aid of Cancer Research and the British Thyroid Foundation. He performed again with Secret Affair at The Isle of Wight Scooter Rally, on 22 August, The Astoria 2, London, on 13 September 2008 and The Small Faces Convention, Islington Academy, 21 September 2008.

In July 2011, Dave Cairns and Secret Affair were invited to re-record 'Time For Action' for Save the Children and the new recording (produced by Ian Page) spearheaded the charity's campaign for health workers in poor countries resulting in 42,000 petition signatures and presented to David Cameron at 10 Downing Street, Sept 2011.

On 5 December 2011 Dave Cairns appeared as a guest on BBC Two's, "Never Mind The Buzzcocks" (season 25, episode 10) hosted by Cilla Black with panel captains, Phill Jupitus and Noel Fielding and guests, Rizzle Kicks, Tiffany Stevenson, Holly Willoughby, Angelos Epithemiou to an audience of over two million UK viewers.

Dave Cairns continues to perform regularly with Secret Affair from 2009 to the current day playing UK dates and shows in 2011 Dublin, Madrid & Moscow, Tokyo and with 2012 shows in Siena, Glasgow, M-Fest Leeds, and a 13-date tour of the UK ending at The 229 Club London on 24 November 2012.

Secret Affair released their fourth studio album, Soho Dreams, after a 30-year absence, on their I-SPY Records label on 10 September 2012 and continued to tour throughout 2014. 'Est 1979' The Sony BMG Secret Affair 35th Anniversary 4 album box set was released in January 2015. The band celebrated their 40th anniversary in 2019 with a 14-date UK spring tour.

In the past Cairns has written and produced music for TV commercials, including Lee Cooper (entitled 'Ace Faces' 1980), Toyota, Ford, and Raymond Weil watches (a classical piece entitled 'Precision Movements'1995) and winner of the 1995 London International Advertising Awards.

On 21 April 2017 the second album by Walk on Fire, Mind Over Matter, was released on the AOR record label, Escape Music. and was written and produced by David Cairns back in 1990.
