= Ian Page (singer) =

- Born: 19 June 1960 (age 64)
- Occupation(s): Musician, gamebook author
- Instrument: Vocals
- Member of: Secret Affair
- Formerly of: New Hearts

Ian Page (born 19 June 1960) is a British musician, gamebook author, and vocalist in the band Secret Affair.

== Career ==
Teaming up with guitarist David Cairns while at school, Ian Page formed power pop/punk band New Hearts and signed to CBS Records in 1977, releasing two singles and touring with the Jam before the demise of the New Hearts in 1978.

Continuing to work with Cairns and forming Secret Affair, the two songwriters spent the second half of 1978 writing songs that would form the basis of the first two Secret Affair albums. Page sang lead vocals in the group and is also credited as the band's trumpeter and keyboardist on the sleeve of their first album, Glory Boys. In a period of a little over two years, the band posted five releases in the UK Singles Chart, and released three albums. The debut single "Time for Action" sold 198,000 copies and reached number 13 in the UK Singles Chart in 1979, giving them their highest chart position. Lesser chart success followed with "Let Your Heart Dance", "My World" and "Sound of Confusion".

Secret Affair regularly appeared on UK television show Top of the Pops and were cover stars of many UK magazines, including New Musical Express, Sounds and Smash Hits. Likened to Jimmy Pursey, Ian Page was often asked to appear on UK television programmes, although his opinionated views sometimes alienated as many potential fans as they won over.

After the split of Secret Affair in 1982, Page released two solo singles – "Too Young" and "Unity Street" – under the name of Ian Page and Bop before leaving music. In his lyrics he had often railed against the music industry and his decision to quit the business was borne out of the same frustration.

By the mid-1980s, he turned fantasy author, and wrote a series of spin-off books in the Lone Wolf universe titled The World of Lone Wolf.

In 1999, he returned to the live stage, touring with his band Ian Page and The Affair (Bob Clarke – drums, Jerry Lee – guitar, Ian Jones – bass), performing a mixture of his own hits, soul covers and new material. Starting off with a show at Colchester Arts Centre, playing a mix of Secret Affair tunes and soul covers, followed by a performance at Londons Forum as part of the Mods May day 99 gig, 20 years on from the original Mods May day gig, introduced on to stage that day by Tony Clark who went on to be The Affairs manager touring with the band all over the UK, Europe and Scandinavia. With this band he released a series of singles, including "Prove It". He parted company with this band in 2007, having recorded the largest part of an as yet unreleased album.

In 2002, he once again teamed up with Dave Cairns to reform Secret Affair, initially for three gigs in the UK, including a performance at London's Shepherd's Bush Empire. They returned in June the following year, playing at The Scala in London to promote the release of Time For Action: The Anthology (Sanctuary), a major CD retrospective of hits, rarities and previously unreleased tracks. The concert was filmed and released on DVD. In 2005, Page and Cairns attempted to mend their sometimes fractious relationship and started work on a fourth Secret Affair album, recording five new songs. The album eventually came to fruition in 2012, entitled Soho Dreams, entirely financed by the band without any record company involvement. In 2017, they continued to tour and record as Secret Affair and celebrate their 40th anniversary in 2019 with a 14 date UK April/May spring tour.

== Personal life ==
Page lives in Essex and is a Tottenham Hotspur F.C. supporter.

== Bibliography ==
The World of Lone Wolf:

- Grey Star the Wizard (1985)
- The Forbidden City (1986)
- Beyond the Nightmare Gate (1986)
- War of the Wizards (1986)
