= Captain's Log (magazine) =

Captain's Log is a biannual magazine produced by Amarillo Design Bureau, designed to feature gaming and background material relating to the various game systems of the Star Fleet Universe. While originally focussed on Star Fleet Battles, as the number of games produced by ADB has grown, the magazine has increased the range of games it supports (including the Federation Commander game system.)

It was started in the early 1980s by Task Force Games, at that time the publisher of Star Fleet Battles as a vehicle to publish scenarios for SFB. As time passed, it became larger, with more diverse content (in both type and games covered). However, all content is still focused the SFU.

== Layout ==
Each issue is generally divided into a number of sections:

=== History ===
This section contains at least one fiction story set in the universe, a number of smaller (one-page) articles featuring specific data on certain aspects of the universe (such as medals used by a specific race's military, for example).

=== Communications ===
This section presents news on upcoming products, after-action reports on previous releases, as well as question-and-answer articles.

=== Scenarios ===
Mostly featuring new scenarios for SFB - usually including a scenario tied to the fiction pieces included in the issue - recent issues have also included similar scenarios for FC.

=== Shipyard ===
Each issue includes new ship SSDs for SFB (and recently, including preview Ship Cards for FC), as well as background data relating to each new ship introduced.

=== Database ===
Including supplementary background information, as well as new articles for Star Fleet Battle Force and Prime Directive.

=== Venues ===
Covering the play-by-mail, play-by-email and online gaming aspects of the universe, as well as occasional articles covering the Star Fleet Command PC games.

=== Tactics ===
This section goes from detailing victories in tournament play (such as at Origins Game Fair), racial 'primers' (overviews of new factions, to aid players in understanding what they have to offer), as well as Term Papers (advice for using specific tactics in play for certain ship types and weapons etc).

=== The Department of Strategic Studies ===
This is the section for Federation and Empire, and mirrors on a lesser scale the SFB content of the rest of the magazine - with news of upcoming products, tactical notes, experimental rules and scenarios, and F&E-style information on the new ships presented in the Shipyard section.

== Reception ==
Jeffrey W. Cisneros reviewed Captain's Log #13 in White Wolf #44 (June, 1994), rating it a 2.5 out of 5 and stated that "I'm not overly fond of this installment in the SFB series. As a person who appreciates good wargaming and SFB, I am truly disappointed. Mr. Cole could have done this universe more good with a truly original supplement and fresh ideas. The constant use of jargon and gaming 'buzzwords' can confuse novices. The book's fiction is entertaining, but doesn't make up for other problems. I cannot recommend this product."
