= Warsaw Pact (wargame) =

Cold War board wargame

- Cover of JagdPanther #14
- Designers: Stephen V. Cole
- Publishers: JagdPanther Publications
- Publication: 1976
- Genres: Cold War

Warsaw Pact is a board wargame published by JagdPanther Publications in 1976 that simulates hypothetical World War III battles between Warsaw Pact and NATO forces in Europe.

== Description ==
Warsaw Pact is a 2-player board wargame in which one side controls NATO forces, and the other side controls Warsaw Pact forces.

=== Components ===
The game includes a map of Europe from Norway to Turkiye (with 1976 states and boundaries) scaled at 25 mi (40 km) per hex. The game also includes 162 double-sided die-cut counters that represent armies from the Warsaw Pact (Russia, Romania, Czechoslovakia, Poland, Bulgaria, East Germany, Hungary), NATO (United States, Greece, West Germany, Turkiye, U.K., Canada, Italy, Denmark, the Netherlands, France, Belgium, Austria) and neutral Yugoslavia, Albania and Switzerland.

=== Gameplay ===
The game system uses an alternating system of double impulse movement, with "sticky" zones of control. (Units that enter an enemy zone of control must stop and fight until one or the other is destroyed or forced to retreat.) Each turn represents 10 days of game time, and each game lasts ten turns.

=== Supply ===
As critic Charles Vasey noted, "The nub of the game is Russian supply." All Warsaw Pact units are required to be kept at full supply or they deplete as if they had taken combat casualties. Supply is also needed to rebuild, and also represents munitions, reflected in combat strength.

=== Scenarios ===
The game comes with three scenarios representing hypothetical wars:

- 1967: Invasion of Czechoslovakia following Prague Spring
- 1973: US/Soviet relations break down following Yom Kippur War
- 1980s: 5–10 years in the future

== Publication history ==
Stephen V. Cole designed Warsaw Pact, which was released as a free pull-out game in Issue 14 of JagdPanther. The game was released as a boxed set by Task Force Games in 1980, and republished as a PDF by Amarillo Design Bureau in 2015.

== Reception ==
In Issue 10 of Perfidious Albion, Geoff Barnard noted, "This is a rather novel game that would seem to work very well as a simulation of the problems that would face the two sides should a war actually break out." Barnard thought that the Warsaw Pact had "a considerable advantage at the start of the game ... Should NATO survive, they can sit and watch as the WP supply gradually runs out, whereupon the Soviet troops and their allies can find themselves floundering, unable to take their objectives."

In the 1977 book The Comprehensive Guide to Board Wargaming, Charles Vasey called this a "Corps/divisional level simulation of possible wars in Europe in the next twenty years." Vasey also noted that combat was "pretty bloody." Vasey concluded, "Scenarios run the gamut from limited wars in the Balkans to The Big One. Frighteningly realistic."

In Issue 26 of Simulacrum, Brian Train called this, "an exciting game, not least in that it poses a variety of scenarios and choices for either player." Train noted, "the game shines in the supply rules for the Russian-Warsaw Pact side – this player has a limited number of supply points that can be used to: rebuild depleted units; prevent unit depletions; double, triple, even quadruple the attack strength of a unit; or allow airborne units to do their stuff."

== Other reviews and commentary ==
- Fire & Movement #6
- The Wargamer Vol.1 #20
- Nexus #2
- Moves #70
