= Prochorovka: Armor at Kursk =

Board game

Cover of microgame edition, 1979

Prochorovka: Armor at Kursk is a board wargame published by Task Force Games in 1979 that attempts to simulate the 1943 Battle of Prokhorovka.

== Background ==
On 12 July 1943, the German 2nd SS Panzer Korps ran into the Soviet 5th Guards Tank Army near the village of Prochorovka. Nearly 1400 tanks and assault guns were involved in the battle, and nearly 300 tanks on each side were destroyed. Although the Russians withdrew from the village, the battle was the final strategic offensive that the Germans were able to launch on the Eastern Front.

== Description ==
Prochorovka: Armor at Kursk is a microgame that pits the SS Panzer Corps against the 5th Guards Tank Army at Prochorovka, the largest tank battle of World War II.

=== Components ===
The microgame, packaged in a ziplock bag, contains:

- 14-page rulebook
- 108 counters
- 20" x 16" paper hex grid two-color map scaled at 400 m (437 yd) per hex, and divided into three sectors by a river and a rail line
- Set-up card

=== Setup ===
Pieces are placed on the board on locations specified by the rules.

=== Gameplay ===
Each turn represents one hour.

==== First turn ====
The players dice for initiative in each of the three sectors.

- The first player in each sector fires at opposing units (but does not move.)
- The second player may move tank units up to half their rated movement and then can fire. If artillery is moved, it cannot fire.
- The first player may also move tank units up to half their rated movement and then can fire. If artillery is moved, it cannot fire.

The player who wins initiative in two of the three sectors will be the first player in all subsequent turns.

==== Subsequent turns ====
- First player
1. Moves
2. Fires
3. Facedown units (damaged in combat): Can either be flipped faceup but remain in place, or remain facedown and moved back three hexes
- Second player: repeats first player's sequence of phases

=== Victory conditions ===
Both sides accumulate victory points for certain terrain features gained, as well as for destroying tanks and artillery. The player with the most points at the end of the game is the winner, although the level of victory, from slight to overwhelming, is determined by the ratio of victory points.

== Publication history ==
Task Force Games had entered the market in 1979 with the microgame Starfire, and followed this immediately with a number of other microgames including Starfleet Battles. The fifth game released by Task Force was Prochorovka: Armor at Kursk, a microgame in a ziplock bag designed by Stephen V. Cole and published in 1979. Later the same year, the game was released as a boxed set retitled as simply Armor at Kursk.

== Reception ==
In Issue 28 of Phoenix, Alestair Brown noted that careful play by the Russian player turned what seemed to be an unbalanced game into a very competitive match. He concluded "I have found Prochorovka an interesting and demanding game. In particular, I enjoyed its uncertainty [...] and the attention given to such items as artillery, [anti-tank] guns, engineers, and their special abilities."

In The Space Gamer No. 37, Nick Schuessler thought this was an uncomplicated game, but liked the low price and advised readers to "appreciate the reasonable price, and save Kursk/Prochorovka for the rainy Sunday afternoon when the thought of one more cycle of War in the Pacific turns your stomach."

In Issue 14 of The Grenadier, Karl E. Wiegers gave this game a mixed rating, saying, "The game is easy to learn, fun to play, and involves the active participation of both players. The interplay of ground units, artillery, and air support provides some interesting tactical situations. However, the game does not give this reviewer much appreciation of the battle of Prochorovka as an enormous clash of armor." Wiegers concluded, "There may be some way for the Russian player to achieve the successes of his historical counterpart, but I haven’t found it yet."

In Issue 97 of Campaign, Ty Bomba commented, "Prochorovka is more than reasonably accurate to the history it seeks to show. Its physical packaging and quality are excellent, considering its cheap price tag, and above all else it plays and plays well."

Richard Berg, writing in Strategy & Tactics #80, was succinct: "There are no ZOCs, so to say that the game is fluid is somewhat of an understatement."

In Issue 50 of Moves, Steve List commented, "The mechanics make for a fluid situation; holding a line requires lots of units, but displacing a line is easy." List concluded by giving the game a grade of "B", saying, "While the game is not a radically new type, it is an interesting treatment of a battle that has gotten little attention thus far. While highly playable, it is not a real thriller."

In Issue 21 of Fire & Movement, Bill Sanders noted, "All in all, the game gives players more than their money's worth. Stephen Cole has succeeded admirably in generating the ‘feel’ of the battle while at the same time providing a lot of fun for both sides. There are no pretensions to minute historical recreation, but Prochorovka has enough historical flavor to reflect the battle’s texture at the operational level."

In Issue 16 of the French game magazine Casus Belli, Frédéric Armand noted, "All things considered, this game gives players value for their money. The inventors have quite successfully recreated the atmosphere of the Battle of Prochorovka, in a fun game regardless of which side of the map you are on." Armand concluded that this game, "does not claim to simulate with perfect historical accuracy the events of July 12, 1943, but has enough flavor to reflect the development of the battle. A game that for all these qualities we expressly recommend."

In Issue 26 of Simulacrum, Pete da Rosa called this, "not the most sophisticated design on the battle, but it is an excellent introduction to war games as the game has a definite beginning and end, an exciting situation with lots of tanks, and play that hustles right along."

== Reviews ==
- Casus Belli #39
