= Star Fleet Battles Commander's Rulebook, Volume II =

Star Fleet Battles Commander's Rulebook, Volume II is a 1984 expansion for Star Fleet Battles published by Task Force Games.

== Gameplay ==
Star Fleet Battles Commander's Rulebook, Volume II is a supplement which organizes and compiles the Star Fleet Battles rules, completing the work started by first volume of Star Fleet Battles Commander's Rulebook.

== Reception ==
Craig Sheeley reviewed Star Fleet Battles Commander's Rulebook, Volume II in Space Gamer No. 70. Sheeley commented that "If you want to keep up with the latest rules, to complete your Volume I or to replace your worn-out expansions cheaply, then Volume II is worth its price. But I must warn you that you can have as much fun with less outlay with just the old rules and expansions."
