= Star Fleet Battles Expansion =

Star Fleet Battles Expansion could refer to:

- Star Fleet Battles Expansion 1, 1980 expansion
- Star Fleet Battles Expansion 2, 1982 expansion
