= Introduction to Star Fleet Battles =

Game supplement

Introduction to Star Fleet Battles is a supplement published by Task Force Games in 1986 for the science fiction combat game Star Fleet Battles that is inspired by the TV series Star Trek.

== Description ==
Introduction to Star Fleet Battles is an introductory version of the game intended to help players learn the Star Fleet Battles rules as they play. Through a series of six modules, new players ("cadets") are introduced first to maneuvering a small ship and firing weapons, and then to more complex systems. The cadet is then promoted to lieutenant and if the player can successfully negotiate the final module, "The Tholian Web", the player is deemed ready to participate in the full Star Fleet Battles game.

The supplement includes a 48-page rulebook, nine starship diagrams, a hex map and 54 die-cut counters.

== Publication history ==
Task Force Games published Star Fleet Battles in 1979, and reviewers quickly noted its extreme complexity. Seven years later, Task Force Games published Introduction to Star Fleet Battles, written by the original game designer Stephen V. Cole, as a means of teaching new players the various layers of complexity, one layer at a time.

== Reception ==
In the June–July 1986 edition of Adventurer (Issue 2), Stephen Dillon called this "A well planned introduction to SFB of benefit to new players and clubs wishing to taste the excitement of Star Fleet command. Introduction to SFB also serves as an excellent solo instruction module."

In the November 1986 edition of White Dwarf (Issue #83), Phil Frances recommended this for new players, saying, "This product is a handy starter for those who didn't understand its fully-fledged big brother, or simply want to test the waters before splashing out on the system."
