= The Galactic Smorgasbord =

Supplement published by Task Force Games

The Galactic Smorgasbord is a supplement published by Task Force Games in 1995 for Star Fleet Battles.

== Description ==
The Galactic Smorgasbord contains samples of game material from several works-in-progress for Star Fleet Battles, Federation and Empire, Prime Directive, and a new ground combat system called Star Fleet Assault.

== Reception ==
In the March 1996 edition of Arcane (Issue 4), James Swallow rated this a poor 5 out of 10 overall, saying, "It's up to each SFB player to decide if they think this is a worthwhile investment or a lazy collection of leftovers."

In the August 1996 edition of Dragon (Issue #232), Rick Swan thought it was "sketchy in places", but admitted that it was "a bargain, allowing players to get a taste of an impressive variety of supplements without having to invest a fortune."
