= Operation Pegasus (disambiguation) =

Operation Pegasus was an Allied evacuation operation in World War II.

Operation Pegasus may also refer to:

- Operation Pegasus (1968), the First Air Cavalry Division's relief of the besieged Marine Corps garrison at Khe Sanh during the Vietnam War
- Operation Pegasus (board game), a 1980 board wargame published by Task Force Games
