= Gorlice-Tarnow, 1915 =

1974 WWI board wargame

- Cover of JagdPanther #7
- Designers: Stephen V. Cole; Don Harris
- Publishers: JagdPanther Publications
- Publication: 1974
- Genres: World War II

Gorlice-Tarnow, 1915 is a wargame published by JagdPanther Publications in 1974 that simulates significant battles on the Eastern Front during World War I.

== Description ==
Gorlice-Tarnow, 1915 is a 2-player game in which one player controls forces of the Triple Alliance while the other player controls force of the Triple Entente. Scenarios are set on the Eastern Front, and cover the war from 1914 to 1916. The components had to fit inside a magazine, so the 15" x 35" map is in six sections, and the counters are uncut and unmounted. Due to a technical issue, the German counters were never printed, and the rules state that players must "Make them yourself."

The hex grid map is scaled to 25 mi (40 km) per hex, and covers the entire Eastern Front from Riga to the Dardanelles. Each turn covers one week of game time.

A special Command Control rule allows more efficient leaders to accomplish more with their armies.

Three scenarios are supplied:

- Lemberg (1914)
- Gorlice-Tarnow (1915)
- Brusilov's Offensive (1916)

== Publication history ==
Gorlice-Tarnow, 1915 was designed by Stephen V. Cole and Don Harris, and published in Issue 7 of JagdPanther (October 1974) as a free pull-out game. Task Force Games later republished this game as a PDF.

== Reception ==
In Issue 3 of Perfidious Albion, Charles Vasey and Geoff Barnard traded comments about the game. Barnard noted, "I found the special rules here were very interesting, and most realistic, in that they make a good job of preventing some of the things that mere game-players will do with the historical accuracy in order to shuffle their units into a winning position. However the result is rather cumbersome, the large number of counters make matters even worse." Vasey replied, "Au contraire, I found this a very realistic game. Without the Command Control rules I would agree that there would be far too many counters, however, as often several armies were frozen, the actual moving was pretty easy." Barnard concluded, "Not a game I would want to play very often." Vasey concluded, "The fortification rules, the political considerations and the large number or armies provided make this one of the most historically faithfull [sic] games that I have played."

In Issue 14 of Paper Wars, Rich Erwin found the optional rules (called "chrome") the best part of the game, commenting, "most of the game is what you'd expect from a 'Third World' product of the early-to-mid 1970’s. However, the chrome is nothing short of wonderful." Erwin also noted "The best concept and the worst executed idea in Gorlice-Tarnow are the Command Control rules. It's something needed if you want to get a feel for the sheer idiocy of most leadership in World War I." However, Erwin found the worst part of the game were the Victory Conditions.

In Issue 26 of Simulacrum, Stephen Rawling wrote, "Preparing bacon and eggs for breakfast requires a contribution from the chicken and a commitment from the pig. In a similar vein, preparing Gorlice-Tarnow for play requires a contribution of manual dexterity to untangle some of the components and a commitment of mental dexterity to untangle some of the rules. Nevertheless ... the effort is worthwhile."
