= Federation Commander: Klingon Border =

Federation Commander: Klingon Border is a 2005 board game published by Amarillo Design Bureau.

== Gameplay ==
Federation Commander: Klingon Border is a game in which starship combat features simplified impulses, on‑the‑fly power allocation, color‑coded ship cards, and miniature‑friendly movement while serving as the core base set for the Federation Commander line.

== Reviews ==
- Pyramid
- Black Gate
