= Star Fleet Battles Expansion 3 =

3rd generation Board wargame from Star Fleet

Cover art by Gary Kalin

Star Fleet Battles Expansion 3 is a supplement published by Task Force Games in 1982 for the science fiction board wargame Star Fleet Battles.

== Description ==
Star Fleet Battles Expansion 3 adds to the Star Fleet universe with a new race (the Wyn); rules for creating minefields and using minesweepers; tenders for pseudo fighters; new weapons; 86 new ships; 26 new ship diagrams and 104 die-cut counters. Nine new scenarios are outlined, including one mini-campaign. Expanded rules and errata for previously published material are also included. This is not a standalone product, and in order to use the material, players need the Designers' Edition of Star Fleet Battles, and the first and second expansions.

== Publication history ==
Task Force Games released Star Fleet Battles, a board wargame based on the Star Trek television series, in 1979. It proved to be very popular, and Task Force produced several expansions, including Star Fleet Battles Expansion 3 in 1982, designed by Stephen V. Cole, with artwork by Gary Kalin.

== Reception ==
In Issue 61 of The Space Gamer, Craig Sheeley was excited by some of the new concepts, including minefields that shoot at enemy ships. But he warned that "Unfortunately, the rules are in the 'old' system, and finding the ruling you need requires a well-trained memory and a lot of luck." He also noted that some of the printing in the rulebook looked "a bit cheap". However, he concluded, "The expansion is a must for SFB players, despite the problems (and SFB players are used to dealing with them by now)."

In Issue 14 of the UK games magazine Imagine, Doug Cowie listed the various expansions included in the package, but warned players that the 14-scenario campaign was "for those with the stamina."
