= Federation Space =

Federation Space is a Star Trek-based space naval combat board game published by Task Force Games in 1981.

== Design and gameplay ==
Federation Space was designed by Stephen Wilcox as a strategic companion to the more tactical Star Fleet Battles system.

The game components are:

- 20" x 24" hex grid map
- 432 back-printed die-cut cardboard counters
- fleet organization charts
- combat results table
- 16-page rulebook

The map covers the large extent of space and many of the space-faring races described in the Star Trek TV series. This included the Federation, Klingons, Romulans, Gorns, Tholians and Hydrans. The Kzinti, a race mentioned in the Ringworld novels of Larry Niven, is also featured.

This is a game of naval fleet action involving dozens (or more) ships. Nearly all ships move at the same speed (Warp Factor 6). With so many ships involved, combat relies on a simple two-step reduction system to determine damage. Each ship only has two statuses: normal (counter face up); and damaged (counter face-down). Taking any damage results in a ship receiving the "Damaged" status. Taking any subsequent damage destroys the ship. Battles continue until one side is either destroyed or withdraws.

Since this is a strategic-level game, some scenarios describe the capture of base stations, starbases or even planets.

There is also a campaign game for three or more players (each playing a different race) in which the players use diplomatic alliances and multiple navies to achieve their strategic goals.

== Reception ==
In the March 1982 edition of The Space Gamer (Issue No. 49), William A. Barton recommended the game, saying, "Federation Space succeeds in its purpose to present a relatively simple, playable Star Trek game which can serve as a strategic module for Star Fleet Battles. Recommended to Trek gamers everywhere."

John Lambshead reviewed Federation Space for White Dwarf #31, giving it an overall rating of 8 out of 10, and stated that "So to sum up: a reasonably buy for megalomaniacs who like to rule the universe, a good buy for Star Trek fans, and an essential buy for Star Fleet Battles enthusiasts."

In the August 1983 edition of Dragon (Issue 76), Tony Watson liked a number of things, including its simplicity of rules and combat, the fleet organization charts, the simple step-reduction damage system, and the colourful components. Watson criticized the size of the map, which although large compared to other combat games, was too small and restrictive for entire fleets. Watson also thought the game did not reward clever fleet maneuvers, relying instead on massed fleets simply engaging head on. He concluded, "Federation Space has much to recommend itself. Both those who play Starfleet Battles and those interested in a fast-moving, action-oriented strategic space game should find this title to their liking."

== Reviews ==
- Adventure Gaming #9
