= Star Fleet Battles Volume II =

Game supplement

Star Fleet Battles Volume II is a 1984 expansion for Star Fleet Battles published by Task Force Games.

== Gameplay ==
Star Fleet Battles Volume II is the second part released for the Star Fleet Battles Commander's Edition.

== Reception ==
Philip L. Wing reviewed Star Fleet Battles Volume II in The Space Gamer No. 71. Wing commented that "For new Star Fleet Battles players, I recommend the boxed set for parts that you need. For converting players, get just the rulebook, but check your old material for needed parts."

Russell Clarke reviewed Star Fleet Battles Volume II for White Dwarf #63, giving it an overall rating of 7 out of 10, and stated that "It creates an exceedingly complex and, at times, contradictory game which nevertheless can be good fun to play."
