= Escape from Altassar =

Science fiction board game published in 1982

Escape from Altassar is a board game published by Task Force Games in 1982 that simulates an attempted escape by human prisoners from an alien penal colony.

== Description ==
Escape from Alrassar takes place on the planet Altassar, where human prisoners are held in a penal colony run by the Spikus aliens who have been at war with the Galacta Confederation for 300 years. In this two-player science fiction game, one player controls the human prisoners, and the other player controls the Spikus. The humans must avoid or neutralize alien Trackers, Recovery Wagons and Trip Nets.

With a small hex grid map, 54 counters and a 16-page rule book, the game uses a simple "I Go, You Go" series of turns.

== Publication history ==
In 1979, Task Force Games introduced their Pocket Games series, a line of science fiction microgames packaged in ziplock bags. Escape from Altassar, designed by Daniel Campagna, was released in 1982. The next year, Task Force Games changed the packaging of their Pocket Games, folding the counters, map and a ziplock bag inside the rules booklet, which was then shrinkwrapped.

== Reception ==
In Issue 61 of The Space Gamer, Tony Watson noted that first impressions were favorable, saying, "This game has several things in its favor. First and foremost is its original premise. The rules certainly seem to capture the flavor of a prison break." However, after playing the game, Watson reported, "I can't recommend Escape from Altassar. Although it has some interesting chrome, there's nothing solid to hang it on. What begins as a nice premise degenerates into a turkey shoot. Task Force Games has done better in the past, and gamers have a right to expect something a bit more polished and refined."

In a retrospective review in Issue 8 of Simulacrum, Joe Scoleri noted that although some of the Pocket Games series, such as Starfire and Starfleet Battles, evolved into "enduring classics" that became bestsellers for Task Force Games, Escape from Altassar did not enjoy the same success, and "the [Pocket Games] line was dropped as unprofitable in 1983."

== Other reviews and commentary ==
- Nexus No.1
