= Boarding Party =

Board wargame published in 1982

Boarding Party is a solitaire science fiction board game published by Task Force Games in 1982 that simulates a boarding party of humans trying to deactivate a killer spaceship.

== Description ==
Boarding Party is a solitaire microgame in which the player controls a party of humans that must board an automated killer space ship that is temporarily disabled and destroy the central computer before the ship can reboot itself and go on a killing rampage. The player only has 14 turns to accomplish this task.

The map represents the narrow winding corridors of the space ship that all lead to the central computer. Automated robots randomly move up and down the corridors at the start of the game. Once the humans have reached the central computer, surviving robots all converge on the central computer room.

== Publication history ==
Boarding Party was designed by Thomas Condon, and featured front cover art by William H. Keith Jr. and back cover art by R. Vance Buck. It was published by Task Force Games in 1982.

== Reception ==
In Issue 64 of Space Gamer, Edwin J. Rotondaro liked the game but questioned its staying power, saying, "Overall, I have to give Boarding Party a B−. The game's not bad, it just doesn't have a lot of replay value."

In Issue 27 of Simulacrum, Brian Train noted, "The cramped map and the inane moves of the robots make the game frustrating at times. I seemed to spend more of my time fumbling at stacks of chits in all too small rooms trying to figure out if they’d just moved or not. A bigger map with ‘spaces’ in which players could stack counters which had just moved and those which had not would have made the game much easier to play."

== Other reviews and commentary ==
- Nexus #7
