= Allen Eldridge =

American game designer

- Occupation: Game designer

Allen D. Eldridge is a game designer who has worked primarily on board games.

== Career ==
Allen Eldridge first met Stephen Cole through a game club in Amarillo, Texas, and Cole brought Eldridge into his company JP Productions a few years after he founded it in 1973. Cole and Eldridge made the decision to close JP in November 1976, and the company was shut down in spring of 1977. Cole and Eldridge co-founded Task Force Games in the fall of 1978 and chose to sell products directly to wholesalers and retailers rather than to individuals. Eldridge was able to make an arrangement for inexpensive boxes, so Task Force was able to release Star Fleet Battles in a regular-sized second edition box. Eldridge stayed with Task Force Games when Cole left in 1983 to form the new Amarillo Design Bureau company. Eldridge sold Task Force Games to the computer game company New World Computing in April 1988.
