= McPherson's Ridge: The First Hours of Gettysburg =

1980 American Civil War wargame

McPherson's Ridge
- Designers: R. Vance Buck
- Publishers: Task Force Games
- Publication: 1980
- Genres: American Civil War

McPherson's Ridge: The First Hours of Gettysburg is a board wargame published by Task Force Games in 1980 that simulates the opening skirmish of the Battle of Gettysburg during the American Civil War (ACW).

== Background ==
In late June 1863, Robert E. Lee's Confederate Army of Northern Virginia and George G. Meade's Union Army of the Potomac were cautiously feeling each other out in the rural farmland of Pennsylvania, each looking for an advantageous position. Yet when they did come together in a gigantic clash, it was almost by accident.

On the evening of 30 June 1863, a Confederate brigade under Brigadier General J. Johnston Pettigrew was ordered by Maj. Gen. Henry Heth to go to Gettysburg to look for supplies in the town, especially shoes.

That evening Major General John Buford, commander of a company of Union cavalry in Gettysburg, received news that a Confederate force was approaching the town from the west. Buford realized that once the Confederates occupied the town, they would be free to situate on Cemetery Hill, the strongest defensive position of the town. Buford sent a messenger back asking for immediate help, then ordered his cavalry to occupy McPherson's Ridge to the west of the town, directly in the path of Pettigrew's brigade. Buford hoped to delay the Confederate advance until Union infantry could arrive and occupy Cemetery Hill in strength.

At 7:30 a.m., advance elements of Pettigrew's Confederate force arrived at McPherson's Ridge and encountered Buford's dismounted Union cavalry; the opening skirmish of the Battle of Gettysburg began..

== Description ==
McPherson's Ridge is a board wargame for 2 players, where one player controls Union forces, while the other controls Confederate forces. The game uses a rules system similar to that developed by Richard Berg for Terrible Swift Sword (Simulations Publications, 1976), another ACW board wargame.

=== Components ===
The game box includes a 19" x 22" hex grid map scaled at 100 yards (91 m) per hex, 216 counters, a 10-page rulebook, and various charts and player aids.

=== Gameplay ===
The game uses an alternating system of phases. The first player does the following phases:

1. Fire
2. Movement (only units that did not fire)
3. Melee

The second player then runs through the same phases, completing one game turn, representing 15 minutes of the battle.

=== Scenarios ===
Two "what if?" scenarios are included. One swaps out Heth's brigades for Confederate cavalry led by J.E.B. Stuart. The other changes the Union XI Corps for I Corps.

== Publication history ==
In 1980, Task Force Games released McPherson's Ridge, an ACW wargame designed by R. Vance Buck and developed by Stephen V. Cole.

== Reception ==
In Issue 54 of Moves, Steve List noted that there were superficial resemblances to Terrible Swift Swords, but pointed out that the Combat Results Table in McPherson's Ridge resulted in considerably more casualties. "What in TSS would merely call for a Pin or morale check draws blood in this game ... This leads to a rapid vanishment [sic] of units from the combat line." List also found the game a bit rough around the edges, commenting, "Compared to the TSS system, as refined through six games [of the Great Battles of the American Civil War series], this one lacks polish. It is not unworkable, but in some ways is incomplete and in others too gimmicky." List concluded by giving this game a grade of C+, writing, "Overall, this is not a bad game, but is by no means outstanding in design, execution or graphics."

In Issue 58 of Fire & Movement, Bill Koff called McPherson's Ridge "a flawed attempt at streamlining the day's action by portraying just the first 3 1/2 hours, yet maintaining victory conditions (regarding holding Cemetery Hill) which realistically could only be obtained after a full day's combat." Koff also castigated artillery rules and an erroneous delay in the Union reinforcement schedule, which he believed gave the Confederate player an overwhelming advantage. "This permits [the Confederates] to make it to Cemetery Hill before noon, and renders the game historical nonsense."

== Other reviews and commentary ==
- The Grenadier #18
