= Star Fleet Battles: Commander's SSD Book =

Cover of SSD Book #1, 1983

Star Fleet Battles: Commander's SSD Book is a series of nine separate supplements published by Amarillo Design Bureau from 1983 to 1987 for the tactical science fiction wargame Star Fleet Battles, which was based on Star Trek.

== Description ==
In 1979, Task Force Games published Star Fleet Battles, a tactical board wargame based on the original Star Trek television series and movies. In 1983, a new version of the game was released as the Commander's Edition. Concurrent with this, Task Force Games started to publish supplements called Commander's SSD Books. Each of these contained the SSDs (Ship's System Displays) for 25–48 new ships.

Each SSD contains a checkbox diagram to track how much damage shields, hulls and ship systems have taken; it also includes all the data needed by the player, including the ship's maneuverability, movement cost, and weapons tables. There are also check boxes for crew, boarding parties, drones, and probes.

From 1983 to 1987, Task Force Games published nine books in the series.

== Reception ==
In the July 1984 edition of White Dwarf (Issue #55), Stuart Aston reviewed the first three of the Star Fleet Battles: Commander's SSD Book series. Aston was quite taken by the high production values, rating the first two 10 out of 10 for Presentation, and the third a 9 out of 10. He concluded by giving all three sets an excellent overall rating of 9 out of 10, saying, "In general, all these books are of a very high standard. All three booklets fall into the 'very nice to have category'. They are not, however, essential to the game, but they do speed it up - which is what they are intended for."

== Other recognition ==
Four copies of the series are held as part of the collection of the Strong National Museum of Play:

- Star Fleet Battles: Commander's SSD Book #1 (Object ID 116.9013)
- Star Fleet Battles: Commander's SSD Book #2 (Object ID 116.9017)
- Star Fleet Battles: Commander's SSD Book #6 (Object ID 116.902)
- Star Fleet Battles: Commander's SSD Book #8 (Object ID 116.9014)
