= Intruder (board game) =

Board wargame published in 1980

Cover art by Alvin Bellflower, 1980

Intruder is a solitaire science fiction microgame published in 1980 by Task Force Games in which a rapidly maturing alien roams a space station, ambushing and killing crew members.

== Description ==
Intruder is a solitaire game based on the movie Alien. A young alien life form has escaped from the labs of the space station Prometheus, and hunts members of the crew as it matures and gains new abilities, moving randomly each turn. The player controls the crew working to find the alien and either capture it when it is young, or kill it in its later life stages before crew losses become unacceptable. If all else fails, the crew can initiate a self-destruct sequence to destroy the Prometheus while escaping by shuttle; however, there is a chance that the alien will also escape by stowing away on one of the shuttles.

=== Gameplay ===
The game map shows the various areas and corridors of the Prometheus with weapons, lab animals, dummy counters and the alien in various locations. The alien and dummy counters are placed facedown and are all moved randomly. The player does not know if a human has encountered the alien or a dummy counter until it is flipped over.

The sequence of play in each turn is:

- Movement of alien: Facedown counters (one of which is the alien) are moved randomly
- Interaction phase: Crew members can investigate facedown counters to try to determine the location of the alien. Combat may ensue.
- Panic phase: If a crew member is killed, all crew members retreat to the command module and the facedown counters are again moved randomly, hiding the new location of the alien.
- Metamorphosis phase: A die is rolled to see if the alien matures and gains new abilities.
- Movement phase: the crew can move to search for the alien or reach caches of weapons or technology. If they reach a facedown counter, interaction combat with the alien may result.
- Self destruct advances: If the self-destruct sequence has been initiated, the sequence advances by one step.

The game components are a 16" x 20" paper map, 54 die-cut counters and a 16-page rulebook, packaged in a zip-lock bag.

=== Other scenarios ===
The game comes with three other scenarios:

- a two-player game where the second player controls the alien
- a solitaire game where a heavily armed boarding party enters the station to hunt down the fully grown alien.
- a two- or three-player scenario where one player controls the Science Officer who wants to capture the alien for study, the second player controls the crew who just want to hunt it down, and a third player can control the alien.

== Publication history ==
In 1977, Metagaming Concepts published Ogre and pioneered the microgame, a small and easy-to-learn wargame, often with a fantasy or science fiction theme, packaged in a ziplock bag or thin plastic case. Several game companies responded with their own lines of microgrames, chief among them the "Fantasy Capsule" and "Space Capsule" microgames of Simulations Publications Inc. and the "Pocket Games" of Task Force Games. The sixth of the Pocket Game line was Intruder, a microgame designed by B. Dennis Sustare, with interior art by R. Vance Buck and Stephen V. Cole, and cover art by Alvin Bellflower. It was published by Task Force Games in 1980.

== Reception ==
In the May–June 1980 edition of The Space Gamer (Issue No. 28), Jerry Epperson was not impressed by Intruder, saying, "I was somewhat disappointed. This one is for solitaire gamers, or others who are really hard up for new sci-fi games."

In the July 1980 edition of Dragon, Tony Watson liked Intruder, saying, "There was a game in that movie [Alien], and Task Force has done a fine job of extracting and offering it to us in a pocket-game format." Watson enjoyed the quick turns that resulted in gameplay of only 45 minutes. His only complaints were about a couple of glitches in the rules, and the shiny finish on the counters, which sometimes revealed the location of the facedown alien due to reflection. Watson recommended the game, saying, "The game... is a lot of fun. The situation is tense and games are often close. The Intruder is truly a mean monster and the player will have to use some brains to defeat it."

Roger Sandell reviewed Intruder for White Dwarf #21, giving it an overall rating of 6 out of 10, and stated that "in the end, my feeling is that this game is a good idea which needs further development. It would have been nice to have seen a game system that, like The Creature That Ate Sheboygan, allowed the Intruder to be radically different each time."

In Issue 27 of Simulacrum, Brian Train noted, "Okay, sure, this is a direct and unauthorised rip-off of the movie Alien, down to the monster on the cover. [...] But it's still a situation that lends itself to a primarily solitaire design, and Dennis Sustare made a fun game out of it."
