= SFBF =

SFBF may refer to:

- San Francisco Bay Ferry, public transit service
- Star Fleet Battle Force, card game
