= Asteroid Zero-Four =

Board game

Asteroid Zero-Four is a science fiction board wargame published by Task Force Games in 1979.

== Description ==
American and Soviet miners in the asteroid belt have been cut off from contact with Earth by solar flares, and become engaged in a nuclear war for dominance.

=== Components ===
The game is played with:

- 17" x 22" map
- counters for missiles, fighters, bombers, tankers, engineers and damage.
- 20-page rulebook
- two Strategic Displays

=== Gameplay ===
During a turn,

- spacecraft and missiles are launched
  - missile targets are revealed simultaneously
  - spacecraft can engage in combat
- spacecraft can land to re-arm, refuel and be repaired
- engineers can be deployed to repair their asteroid

=== Victory conditions ===
At the end of the last turn, the player with the asteroid still best able to function as a mine is the winner.

== Publication history ==
Although best known for their boxed game Starfleet Battles, Task Force Games started in 1979 by publishing a series of microgames designed by Stephen V. Cole, the second being Asteroid Zero-Four, released in 1979 with artwork by Alvin Belflower and Allen D. Eldridge.

Task Force Games continued the same storyline in a sequel, Cerberus, in which the combined U.S.-Russia forces from Asteroid Zero-Four invade another planet.

Task Force Games developed a 16K computer version of Asteroid Zero-Four.

== Reception ==
In the September 1979 edition of Dragon, Tim Kask compared Asteroid Zero-Four to Starfire, also published at the same time by Task Force Games, and found that Asteroid Zero-Four was "slightly more involved than Starfire" but promised to be excellent because both were designed by Stephen Cole.

In Ares Magazine #1 (March 1980), Steve List rated Asteroid Zero-Four at 6 out of 9, saying, "the key to the game is the static defenses; missiles to pick off the incoming ships at long range and lasers to swallow up those who close. Massed attacks are necessary to saturate these defenses. While this game is not particularly good science fiction, it is fun to play."

In the September 1980 issue of The Space Gamer (Issue No. 31), Steve Winter found "Asteroid Zero-Four to be "an intelligent, challenging game. It takes nerves and strategy to play well. If you can handle the bookkeeping, this one will make you sweat."

In the October 1980 issue of Fantastic, game designer Greg Costikyan wrote "If there is a fault, it lies in the lack of innovative design: the premise seems an attempt to rationalize using a carrier system for space combat. Thus, the premise comes after the fact, rather than being the basis for the design of the game. This, in fact, seems to be Task Force's usual problem: a lack of imagination."

Alestair Brown in White Dwarf #22 (December 1980 – January 1981) gave it a 6, and said "verdicts ranged from almost total bewilderment ... to enthusiastic enjoyment".

In Issue 35 of Phoenix, Richard Jordan found the missile damage resolution too time-consuming, and concluded "A good idea, although too much bookkeeping for my liking [...] For Sc-Fi buffs well worth looking at, and for Wargamers in general an excellent combination of Strategy and Tactics."

In Issue 27 of Simulacrum, Joe Scoleri commented, "At its core, Asteroid Zero-Four is a shoot-em-up slugfest. The victory conditions require you to blast the hell out of the mining operations on the opposing asteroid while trying to keep yours from being blasted as badly." Scoleri did note the relative complexity of the game compared to other microgames, saying, "Of course, the game's detail comes at a price. While not overly complex or onerous for its time, today’s gamers may find Asteroid Zero-Four too labor intensive for a pure slugfest style game.

== See also ==
- Galac-Tac
- Starweb
