= Valkenburg Castle (board game) =

Fantasy board wargame

Cover art by Alvin Bellflower

Valkenburg Castle is a 1980 board game published by Task Force Games.

== Description ==
Valkenburg Castle is fantasy board wargame where one player controls the forces of "Good", trying to invade the dungeons of a castle, while the other player controls the forces of "Evil" that are defending the castle.

The castle has five levels of dungeons that are interconnected by ladders and stairs. The defending player can use keys to lock and unlock doors, whereas the attacking player must try to open locked and barred doors without the use of keys. The rules for combat are thorough and cover missile fire, melee fighting, vertical assaults on ladders, magic use, and forcing doors open.

An optional set of rules allows players to use modern arms.

== Publication history ==
When popular fantasy role-playing games like Dungeons & Dragons attracted gamers away from board wargames in the late 1970s, several wargame companies responded by trying to create D&D-like board games, such as Citadel (FGU, 1976) and Melee (Metagaming Concepts, 1977). Task Force Games entered the D&D-like market with Barbarian in 1979 and followed this with Valkenburg Castle, a microgame designed by Stephen V. Cole and published in 1980 with cover art by Alvin Bellflower, and interior art by R. Vance Buck and Allen Edlridge.

== Reception ==
Jerry Epperson reviewed Valkenburg Castle in The Space Gamer No. 28. Epperson commented that "Valkenburg Castle would be worth the money to a 'hard-core' fantasy gamer; others might do better elsewhere. A lot of good ideas went into this game, but some of them got lost."

In Issue 80 of Strategy & Tactics, (May–June 1980), Richard Berg commented, "In essence, this is an urban renewal project ... Moderate complexity; length is not too long, but depends on who's playing and how much you've smoked."

In the October 1980 issue of Fantastic, game designer Greg Costikyan found the game mediocre, writing sarcastically, "The players represent parties who enter the castle in order to fight monsters and take their treasure. A breathtakingly original concept, yes? Again, Task Force demonstrates its immense collective imagination by putting D & D on a game-map."

John Lambshead reviewed Valkenburg Castle for White Dwarf #21, giving it an overall rating of 8 out of 10, and stated that "It has a good solid system on which a gamer can hang his own favourite rules. At the price it must be considered excellent value for money."

In Issue 2 of Pegasus, Clayton Miner found the components rather drab, and the rules relatively complex. Miner also commented that "Valkenburg Castle is by no means a perfect game, it is not as spontaneous as D&D, and lacks the general creativity found in most D&D games, while being very close to a dungeon run." Miner found the game was essentially a fight, noting, "Combat is the central idea of the game, and Valkenburg Castle seems to have been designed primarily as a lesson in the complexity of such a struggle." Miner also found the game was unbalanced in favor of the Evil defenders. Despite these issues, Miner concluded, "In summation, Valkenburg Castle is a very good game (unless you go a little crazy and try to use the rules for modern combat), that lends itself well to the campaign game scenario given in the back, and is well worth the cost, as it will provide many hours of enjoyment and action, in the dark depth of an enemy held catacombe [sic]."

In a retrospective review of Valkenburg Castle in Black Gate, John ONeill said "It was an appealing variation on the classic loot-and-scoot dungeon mechanic, with the added bonus of a compelling backstory, a loyal army, and a chance to win back a crown. What's not to like?"

In Issue 26 of Simulacrum, Brian Train noted, "I recall having a lot of fun with this game when I first got it." Train concluded, "Just for fun, there are rules for modern weapons, so you can try and storm the castle with assault rifles."
