= Star Fleet Battles Expansion 1 =

Star Fleet Battles Expansion #1 is a 1980 expansion for Star Fleet Battles published by Task Force Games. It was packaged with a second and third expansion.

== Gameplay ==
Star Fleet Battles Expansion #1 is an expansion kit that contains errata and rules clarifications for the rules in the original Star Fleet Battles boxed set; the expansion also presents 30 new types of ships as well as two new races and six new weapon types, and includes eight scenarios and two short campaign games that make use of the new features.

== Reception ==
Earl S. Cooley III reviewed Star Fleet Battles Expansion #1 in The Space Gamer No. 37. Cooley commented that "If you play SFB, I highly recommend this expansion kit, if only for the errata."

Steve List reviewed Star Fleet Battles: Expansion Module #1 in Ares Magazine #8 and commented that "What has been published so far goes well beyond Star Trek the TV show, but like Squad Leader and its offspring, it presents a basically playable system onto which layers of minute detail can be heaped ."
