= Star Fleet Battles Supplement 1 =

Game supplement

Star Fleet Battles Supplement #1 is a 1983 expansion for Star Fleet Battles published by Task Force Games.

== Gameplay ==
Star Fleet Battles Supplement #1 contains rules for using various types of fighter craft and carriers used by different races.

== Reception ==
Jim Sizer reviewed The Asylum & Other Tales for White Dwarf #47, giving it an overall rating of 7 out of 10, and stated that "One criticism is that there are no plastic zip-lock bags to keep the counters in, other than that an excellent addition to SFB."

Craig Sheeley reviewed SFB Supplement 1 - Fighters and Shuttles in The Space Gamer No. 71. Sheeley commented that "If you want to collect every part of the Star Fleet Battles rules, or just want new counters and SSDs, then SFB Supplement #1 might be a good buy. Otherwise, just skip the idea of carriers altogether and go with pseudo-fighters."
