= Robots! =

Board wargame published in 1980

Cover art by Alvin Bellflower, 1980

Robots! is a microgame published by Task Force Games in 1980 in which players fight each other using combat robots.

== Description ==
Robots! is a two-player game that takes place after Earth has been blasted with radiation, and the space colonists who have survived must send robots to Earth to mine the resources of the planet, following up with factory ships to exploit the resources found. In order to control all the resources, competing colonists start to build robots to destroy the other robots and factory ships.

=== Gameplay ===
Each player starts the game with no robots, two factory ships and one heavily armed Q-ship camouflaged to look like a factory ship.

Each player assembles a robot from random parts and sends it onto the map to capture a resource area. Once a resource area is captured, the player then lands one of their two factory ships to mine for more resource points with which to build more robots in order to capture more resource areas.

Combat has been characterized as "fast action and sudden destruction" and can involve robots fighting robots, or robots attacking a factory ship.

=== Victory conditions ===
The winner is the first player to destroy the other player's two "real" factory ships — destruction of the Q-ship doesn't count.

== Publication history ==
In 1977, Metagaming Concepts published Ogre and pioneered the microgame, a small and easy-to-learn wargame, often with a fantasy or science fiction theme, packaged in a ziplock bag or thin plastic case. Several game companies responded with their own lines of microgrames, chief among them the "Fantasy Capsule" and "Space Capsule" microgames of Simulations Publications Inc. and the "Pocket Games" of Task Force Games. One of the Pocket Game line was Robots!, a microgame designed by William Ferguson III and Mike Joslyn, with interior art by Bob Bingham, R. Vance Buck, Stephen Wilcox and Allen Eldridge and cover art by Alvin Bellflower. It was published by Task Force Games in 1980.

== Reception ==
In The Space Gamer No. 33, Steve Jackson commented that "On the whole, an excellent tactical game, given a slight strategic flavor by the resource rules. Highly recommended for any SF gamer except (possibly) the absolute beginner."

In Issue 47 of Dragon, Tony Watson was "very impressed" with this game, saying, "It has a good, clean game system with lots of action and a fair amount of room for developing tactics. The rules allowing each player to design his own robots are the real core of the game and its major appeal. Players can test new strategies each game by literally creating their own units, deciding on strengths and weaknesses and the balance between quantity and quality." Watson concluded, "Robots! is a great buy and should be a welcome addition to most SF gamers’ collections."

In Issue 27 of Simulacrum, Brian Train noted, "The build-your-own-robot aspect of the game is appealing, though there can be unwieldy stacks wobbling across the map as one robot could legally comprise seven counters."
