= Moon Base Clavius =

1981 board game

Moon Base Clavius is a science fiction board wargame published by Task Force Games in 1981.

== Gameplay ==
Moon Base Clavius is a two-player wargame set in the American lunar colony in Clavius Crater in the mid-21st century. One player, playing the Soviet Lunar Army, attacks the second player's Air Force stationed at Clavius Moon Base.

=== Components ===
The components of the game are:

- 108-die cut cardboard counters
- 16" x 21" map
- 18-page rulebook

=== Combat ===
This game uses a "shoot and move" sequence (each of the active player's units shoots first, then moves). The range of most weapons is one hex. To resolve combat damage, the attacker's combat strength is cross-indexed against the defender's type of terrain, resulting in a target number. If the attacker can equal or better the target number on two six-sided dice, the target is destroyed; any result lower than the target number leaves the target untouched.

There are tactical nuclear weapons in the game that affect one hex; after the attack, the target hex cannot be entered for one turn.

=== Movement ===
Most infantry units can move 10 hexes per turn, although various types of terrain can slow units down; infantry can use rocket-powered backpacks at a cost of 1 hex of movement per turn to negate all terrain costs. Units cannot move through an enemy unit's zone of control (the six hexes surrounding the unit) unless they pay an extra movement point to ignore the zone of control. Units crossing through an enemy's zone of control in this way need not attack the enemy unit.

American units can use the monorail system to move unlimited distances, although they cannot use the monorail to move through an enemy unit's zone of control.

=== Scenarios ===
The game provides three scenarios that simulate the various phases of the attack: initial assault; attacks on the colonies within Clavius Crater; and landing of the American marines. A fourth scenario is the campaign game that links the three shorter scenarios together into one ongoing game.

== Publication history ==
Moon Base Clavius was designed by Kerry Anderson and released by Task Force Games in 1981 with artwork by Alvin Belflower and R. Vance Buck. Anderson later related that two parts of his design were altered by Task Force Games before publication, without his knowledge or subsequent approval: the Sequence of Play and the combat system.

== Reception ==
In the June 1982 edition of The Space Gamer (No. 52) W.G. Armintrout thought the game was stacked against the Russian attackers, and concluded, ""Moon Base Clavius is a simple, fun game. If it were balanced I would recommend it. It isn't, so I can't."

In the May 1983 edition of Dragon (Issue 73), Tony Watson was disappointed. "The situation seems to be one that could be dealt with in a very exciting manner, but the game comes off rather flat. While the combat system is nicely crafted, it’s not very decisive, and the game generally turns into a series of little slugfests." Watson also found the third stage of the combat, the arrival of the Marines, to be "the biggest disappointment... They arrive with too few turns left in the game to be of much use." Watson concluded with a thumbs down, saying, "The idea behind Clavius is a good one, but the game begs for some chrome, something to spice it up meaningfully. As is, it quickly becomes a dull exercise."

In the Fall 1983 edition of Ares (Issue 15), Kim Paffenroth found the game boring. He disagreed with the concept of being able to ignore terrain and zones of control, which resulted in an even sameness for all units, and made defensive strategies superfluous. Although Paffenroth found the combat rules "somewhat better" than the movement rules, the result was a generally uninteresting series of sorties. He concluded, "Moon Base Clavius is a pretty sorry game."

In Issue 27 of Simulacrum, Brian Train noted, "the game could have been a lot better. If you have this game, try playing it with the sequence "movement then combat" instead of "combat then movement." It makes a considerable difference."
