= Star Fleet Battles Commander's Rulebook =

Star Fleet Battles Commander's Rulebook is a 1983 expansion for Star Fleet Battles published by Task Force Games.

== Gameplay ==
Star Fleet Battles Commander's Rulebook is a supplement which consolidates the previous rules and expansions.

== Reception ==
Craig Sheeley reviewed Star Fleet Battles Commander's Rulebook in Space Gamer No. 66. Sheeley commented that "The Commander's Rulebook is what Star Fleet Battles should have been in the first place. If you have a photographic memory and can remember where every rule is with the old system, you won't need this rulebook. If not, this rulebook will be almost essential."
