= Cerberus (board game) =

Science fiction board game published in 1979

Cerberus is a science fiction board wargame published by Task Force Games in 1979.

== Description ==
Cerberus is a two-player wargame in which one player controls human forces, while the other player controls Cetian forces. The game is set in the year 2094, following the events in the previous Task Force Games wargame Asteroid Zero-Four. The Russian and American forces who had fought each other for control of the asteroid belt in the previous game now discover a warp point that allows them to jump to Proxima Centauri and invade an alien planet.

== Gameplay ==
The game uses a standard "I Go, You Go" system of alternating turns, where one player moves and attacks, followed by the other player. Special Forces can be used to disrupt spaceports, destroy supplies and support ground troops.

== Publication history ==
In the late 1970s, Task Force Games published a number of microgames in the "Pocket Game" line — games packaged in ziplock bags — including Asteroid Zero-Four in 1979, and its sequel Cerberus later the same year. Both games were designed by Stephen V. Cole and featured artwork by Alvin Belflower and Allen D. Eldridge.

== Reception ==
In the September 1979 edition of Dragon, Tim Kask found that although Cerberus was slightly more complex than Task Force Games's other offerings of the time, Starfire and Asteroid Zero-Four, it was "still relatively simple."

In the November 1979 issue of The Space Gamer (Issue No. 33) Greg Wilson characterized it as "a solid game, playable and re-playable. While the occasionally-plodding pace makes it less than perfect for a blood-and-thunder player, I think it is well worth the money... All in all, Cerberus is a Recommended"

In the October 1980 issue of Fantastic, game designer Greg Costikyan wrote "Regardless of the undeniable competence of the execution, one is less than enthusiastic with the flavor of the game. If one wishes to play a conventional land combat game, there are dozens on the market."

In a retrospective review in Issue 25 of Simulacrum, Luc Olivier commented, "In spite of the scale and the strategic dimension of the game, Cerberus is not that much fun to play. Yes, the entire planet is accessible and a lot of different troops are available, but the strategies are rather limited. [...] As both camps have about the same forces, with slow movement and non lethal combat, the game is painful and hard to win. With balanced victory conditions, a draw is the usual result." Olivier concluded, "Cerberus has a fascinating theme: conquer a full planet, but the scale, for me, is not optimal: you’ve got a strategic game with an operational pace. With weekly turns, fewer units and more powerful weapons, the game would have become more fluid with more strategic opportunities."
