= Federation and Empire =

Strategy boardgame

Federation and Empire (F&E) is a strategic-level board wargame set in the fictional Star Fleet Universe spin-off of Star Trek, currently published by Amarillo Design Bureau Inc. (ADB). It is a stand-alone product, but has sometimes been considered the official campaign generator for Star Fleet Battles.

== Overview ==
In outline, Federation and Empire is fairly typical for a grand strategy game. Players take alternating turns, managing the resources of their side to build ships and defenses, and maneuver their ships (or fleets) to attack the enemy and then resolve the resulting combats; his opponent then does the same on his turn. In detail, it is a bit more sophisticated. During movement enemy ships can react a short distance onto moving ships. There are rules for the interaction of these forces, which may force some or all of the moving ships to stop, being pinned by the reacting enemy. After movement, the non-moving player can also move a few limited reserves of ships to battles so as to shore up the defense of critical points. After combat, the moving player retrogrades or moves ships that were in combat back to source of supply or repair, and finally moves a limited number of ships vast distances to prepare for the coming enemy turn.

Combat itself is resolved in a number of combat rounds after the two players each deploy their battleforces. A battleforce is the group of ships each player selects to participate in combat from the stack of starships (and other units like bases) in the battle hex. In F&E there are no stacking limits, but only the ships in each battleforce may participate directly in combat, and this number is limited by the command rating of the designated flagship of the battleforce. The ship classes with the greatest command ratings are the dreadnoughts and heavy battlecruisers, with ratings of ten. Command cruisers have ratings of nine, heavy cruisers eight, and so on with the smaller ship classes. So a battleforce headed by a dreadnought could bring up to ten other warships with it into the combat phase. Certain specialty ships may be added above this limit; for instance a fleet scout or a squadron of drone bombardment ships, etc. Command points may also be expended and allocated to the battle hex, each permitting one extra ship to be added to the battleforce. Command points reflect commitments by fleet headquarters to organize and deploy more assets to the battleforce.

To resolve a combat round, the offensive rating factors for each ship/unit are summed to produce the battleforce's compot, or combat potential. Each player also chooses a Battle Intensity Rating reflecting how aggressively the ship captains handle their ships. A die is thrown; when indexed with the BIR and adjusted for electronic warfare, a percentage is obtained. This multiplied by the compot produces the number of damage points scored on the enemy battleforce. The attacking player has the option of allocating some of this damage as directed damage on one (and only one) of his opponent's units. The unit chosen is crippled by turning its counter over to its crippled (reverse) side. The attacker may expend more of his damage score to finish off (destroy) the enemy unit. When using directed damage the attacker must expend two points of his damage score to produce each point of directed damage (one ship can be designated by its owner to be in a protected position in the battleforce and is attacked by directed damage at a three-to-one ratio. Usually this ship is the flagship or an especially valuable unit like a fleet tug. The fleet scout and any drone bombardment ships also enjoy this advantage). Special warships known as maulers, deployed in small numbers during the General War by the Coalition (Romulan, Klingon and Lyran fleets), can inflict directed damage at a one-to-one ratio. After directed damage is resolved, remaining damage points are absorbed by the defender as he chooses at a one-to-one ratio of damage inflicted to damage taken.

Both players compute their combat results simultaneously and take turns resolving the effects of their attacks. These actions complete one round of combat. Before the next round commences, players may transfer attrition units between their battleforces and the ships not participating in the combat, e.g. fighters and fast patrol ships. The purpose of such a transfer would be to replace destroyed attrition units and restore carriers and/or PF flotillas in the battleforce to their full capacity prior to the next combat round. Then, before the following round, each player must decide to continue the combat or withdraw from the battle hex. If so, his opponent has the option of pursuit (usually in an effort to pick off cripples which are disadvantaged in their attempt to disengage). Combat rounds are repeated until one battleforce withdraws or is destroyed. An additional step is required if a flagship is destroyed or withdrawn: if a replacement flagship lacks the requisite command rating to command the number of ships in its battleforce, then the battleforce must be voluntarily reduced to the new flagship's command rating.

Combat resolution is different in battle hexes involving bases and/or planets. Here the attacker must offer the defender an "approach battle" in which the attacker's battleforce can be engaged at a distance from the base/planet by the defender's mobile units. The base/planet cannot participate in combat directly but can lend EW support and send attrition units. The advantage here for the defender is that the base/planet cannot be fired upon until and unless the attacker destroys or drives off the defender's battleforce. The defender may decline the approach battle in which case the base/planet may be included in his battleforce, at risk of destruction (or in the case of a planet capture or devastation). In Capital hexes of each of the races/empires (all containing several homeworld planets and the all-important Shipyards), a special pre-combat procedure involves the defender having to divide his fleet into separate battleforces for each homeworld/shipyard in the strategic battle hex. After inspecting the defender's order of battle at each location, the attacker likewise forms independent battleforces for each of the defender's locations; from there the usual base/planet procedure is implemented involving the mandatory offer of approach battles.

The main focus of the game is the General War, an 18-year-long conflict set in the Star Fleet Universe that involves all the major powers of the Alpha Octant. The scale is extremely large compared to board games in a terrestrial setting, with each hex on the map representing 500 parsecs. As the rules point out, this reduces the Milky Way Galaxy as shown on the map to a two dimensional object, because only the core would have a cross-section greater than one hex and the core is not rendered on the map. Units are typically individual ships, each with its own combat rating. Each of the interstellar governments or "empires" can have dozens, perhaps hundreds, of ships, leading to a game with a potentially very high number of counters used, on a map that is only as large as a "small" strategy game. However, significantly larger maps are available for purchase directly from ADB that greatly reduce this problem. Player aids also permit individual counters to represent large fleets, with the constituent ship counters being kept off map.

While nominally a two player game, players must keep each empire's records separate, meaning that is easy to run each side as a team with up to one player per empire. Team play can involve up eight people, but more typically involves four to five players.

The main boxed set has a series of scenarios that can be played individually, but together outline the play of the entire General War. As well, it also allows for free campaigns outside of the canonical Star Fleet Universe timeline to be played, with canonical orders of battle for each of the stellar empires. The expansions typically have a number of scenarios, which may be a focused treatment of a particular part of the General War, or an alternate way the war could have begun. There are also a limited number of scenarios that show other conflicts in the region, such as the Four Powers War.

== Editions and supplements ==
=== Early versions ===
Federation and Empire itself was originally published in 1986 by Task Force Games (TFG). The rulebook has been revised five times since then. All editions come with 'fleet charts' (sheets of off-map holding areas for excess counters), 'capital charts' (to detail the contents of the capital systems of the various empires), and the main map. The original set included 10 numbered sheets of double-sided counters for ships as well as two sheets of single-sided counters for markers and the like.

TFG's first strategic level game for the Star Fleet Universe was Federation Space, released in 1981. It was derived from the current working draft of what became Federation and Empire, and so can be considered an "older brother" to it, even though there are notable differences between the two. One such difference was that Federation Space did not use the battleforce concept in combat resolution. All the starships in the battle hex participated in combat. The result was that the sheer quantity of ships tended to dominate the contest over the quality of the ships in the contest. This almost always resulted in hordes of the inferior ships of the Klingon Deep Space Fleet overwhelming the smaller but high-quality Federation Starfleet. Another difference with F&E is that the rules for handling fleet carriers with their fighter wings were immature.

=== Deluxe Edition ===
Federation and Empire Deluxe Edition was published in 1989 by TFG with the significantly updated and expanded "Rev-1" rulebook, a nicer-looking map and a new set of counters. Deluxe Edition retained the two single-sided counter sheets, but had three identical sets of four double sided counters (referred to as A, B, C, and D), providing two extra sheets by excluding a small number of unique units. Subsequent printings included updated "Rev-2" and "Rev-3" rulebooks.

At the time, the rules mentioned an upcoming expansion, Total War which was expected to provide all the things that could not fit in the box. However, as new ships and ideas were still be promptly introduced to the SFU through Star Fleet Battles, this proposed expansion quickly took on dimensions equal to the original game.

- Carrier War (subtitled Total War Part One) was the first supplement offered for F&E in 1993. It consisted of new rules, new scenarios, and counters providing separate carriers and escorts (which had only existed in pre-defined "groups" to save space in the original).
- Special Operations was a smaller module published in 1993 that brought in several new rules, such as Klingon Stasis Field Generators.
- Marine Assault was published in 1995 and featured extensive rules detailing the use of ground troops and marines in strategic operations.

=== 2000 Edition ===
When Amarillo Design Bureau took over the publishing of all Star Fleet Universe material from TFG, they continued selling the Deluxe Edition, but soon released another large rewrite of the rules in 2000. This "Rev-4" rulebook is usually called "F&E2K".

In 2004, the countersheets were again changed, from ABCD to One and Two. (Current sheets are twice the size of old ones.) In total, the number of counters are the same, but the counters that players may want extras of have been segregated onto Two, so that they can be bought separately. Once the counters are punched out, there are no differences between "F&E2K4" and the previous version.

- Advanced Operations, published in 2003, was the first new expansion after the rewrite in F&E2K and focuses on the later years of the General War with X-ships, heavy war destroyers, as well as more sweeping rules like raids and battlegroups.
- Combined Operations was published in 2003 as a revised replacement for both Special Ops and Marine Assault. It provided a much-needed rewrite of elements of the earlier expansions and included new content such as police ships.
- Fighter Operations was published in 2004 as an updated version of Carrier War and also introduced new carrier types to the game.
- Planetary Operations, published in 2004, features more ways of producing and repairing ships, like planetary repair docks and depot-level repair.
- Strategic Operations, includes rules and counters for hospital ships, sector bases, diplomatic teams, and other additions to the game system.

In addition, Captain's Log has a regular section devoted to the game, and often includes preview material for future expansions, such as the set of trial rules for the Interstellar Concordium in issue 25.

=== 2010 Edition ===
In March 2010, ADB Inc. released a new edition of Federation and Empire, the first significant change since the 2000 edition. While the map and various charts are identical to the previous edition, key differences include a new rulebook and all new counter sheets.

The 2010 rulebook includes all previous errata, and addresses new issues discovered in the 10 years since the previous edition. Many rules were updated to better combine with the various expansion products, and to accommodate the expanded counter mix provided by the new counter sheets.

Due to changes in manufacturing, the counter sheets now contain over 2100 counters (as opposed to over 1500 of the previous edition). This allowed the many carrier groups in the game to exist as individual ships instead of multi-ship counters, and the new rules eliminated the special bookkeeping this once required.

ADB plans to convert the Deluxe Edition expansions to the new 2010 rules in the future.

- ISC War published in June 2011, brings the Interstellar Concordium into the game after a 25-year wait. The game includes the "ISC pacification" scenario at the end of the General War, as well as a scenario on the expansion of the ISC to their borders at the beginning of General War.
- Minor Empires published in 2017, includes the rules and counters for the Vudar, Lyran Democratic Republic and the Seltorians, as well as several scenarios showcasing these empires.
- Tactical Operations will be primarily a counters only product with minimal rules and adding ships not currently in the game from previously published Star Fleet Battles products.
- Civil Wars will cover the Romulan Civil War and the Kzinti War of Return (both from the end of the General War), the Lyran Civil Wars from before the General War, as well as the introduction of WYN and Lyran Democratic Republic to the Federation and Empire system.
- Fighter Operations was updated again in 2016.

== Reception ==
Robert Blinkhorn reviewed Federation and Empire for Adventurer magazine and stated that "the game adds little to the expansive details given by the countless number of Star Fleet Battles rulesbooks and supplements already available, and unless you would like some extra counters and a detailed map of the galaxy, or you are little short of fanatical about Star Fleet Battles, then I feel you may be disappointed with Federation and Empire."
