= City States of Arklyrell =

Board game published in 1983

Cover art by Michael Penn, 1983

City States of Arklyrell is a fantasy board wargame for 2–4 players published by Task Force Games in 1983, a microgame in which players fight for control of the most Citadels.

== Gameplay ==
City States of Arklyrell is a 2–4 player wargame in which players seek to command the eight Citadels found on the world of Arklyrell.

The game components consist of:

- 16-page rulebook
- 17" x 21" color map
- 54 counters

The game map represents an entire world, with six continents and the poles at the north and south of the map.

In order to win, the players must recruit neutral combatants to join them.

=== Turn sequence ===
Each player does the following sequence.

1. Moves units Each unit has an allowance factor, which is moderated by difficult terrain such as deserts or mountains. Players must use either boats or giant rocs to move their units between continents. Units leaving either the east or west edges of the map reappear on the opposite edge of the map.
2. Recruitment Each player has a leader who can attempt to recruit one unit per turn.
3. Resolves combat There are no zones of control to hamper movement, and the active player initiates combat if wanted. Combat is resolved with a die roll modified by the difference in the combat values of the units involved, as well as terrain, and the type of defender. Possible results are: no result; retreat of all attacking units; or retreat of all defenders. If a unit cannot retreat, it is eliminated. (Leaders cannot be eliminated.)

=== Magic items ===
There are seven magic items scattered across the continents. Two of these are fake, forcing the player to miss the next turn. The others help in recruiting and combat.

=== Victory conditions ===
The player who controls the most citadels after 25 turns is the winner. Players can also force an immediate win by controlling four Citadels in the three- or four-player game, or five Citadels in a two-player game.

== Publication history ==
In 1977, Metagaming Concepts published Ogre and pioneered the microgame, a small and easy-to-learn wargame, often with a fantasy or science fiction theme, packaged in a ziplock bag or thin plastic case. Several game companies responded with their own lines of microgrames, chief among them the "Fantasy Capsule" and "Space Capsule" microgames of Simulations Publications Inc. and the "Pocket Games" of Task Force Games. One of the Pocket Games line was The City States of Arklyrell, a microgame designed by Mike Joslyn, with interior art by R. Vance Buck and Rick Buck and cover art by Michael Penn. It was published by Task Force Games in 1983.

== Reception ==
In the February 1984 edition of Dragon (Issue #82), Steve List was not impressed by the game, saying that it "doesn’t have what it takes to stand out... It has nothing to make it better than the many others of its ilk that are already available. The combat system is pedestrian; its only original feature is the procedure for losing control of units due to morale effects. The game is basically a pastiche of game mechanics that have been used before, re-assembled in a package that is not noticeably more interesting or exciting than its predecessors."

Jacob Ossar reviewed The City States of Arklyrell for Fantasy Gamer magazine and stated that "Overall, CSA is a very good game and gives players a variety of options. Although it is not overly original or realistic, it works well and is fun to play. The City States of Arklyrell is fairly simple, and experienced players will find it a nice break from more complex, involved games."

In Issue 27 of Simulacrum, Brian Train noted, "Curiously, while the game features fantastic units and magic items, there is no spellcasting involved." Train identified the activity that occupies players most of the time and was also his pet peeve: "Much of the play involves your marching around the map trying to get the various neutral combat units to join you, by roll of the die. This highlights the most annoying point of the game system: there is no way to keep track of who controls what unit, except for a unit roster which you must make yourself.
