= Supervillains (role-playing game) =

Tabletop superhero role-playing game

Supervillains is a superhero role-playing game published by Task Force Games in 1982.

== Gameplay ==
Supervillains, set in New York City, is a combination of a board game and a role-playing game involving tactical combat between superheroes and supervillains. It is a "generic" superhero game that is not associated with a line of comics such as Marvel or DC.

The game comes with a board map and cardboard counters representing the pregenerated heroes and villains. A few role-playing rules are included.

== Publication history ==
Supervillains was designed by Rick Register and published by Task Force Games in 1982.

== Reception ==
Steve Perrin reviewed Supervillains for Different Worlds magazine and stated that "In general, I think that Supervillains might prove to be an entertaining diversion for one to two players, as the tactical elements of the game could provide enough variety for several play sessions. It also gives some ideas for a supervillain-point-of-view campaign, and a nice, if undetailed map of the boroughs of New York. However, don't expect to find a complete role-playing game."

In Issue 56 of The Space Gamer, Steve List commented that "While super-powered villains are the stuff of comic books, a game about them must be designed at a level demonstrating more sophistication than a comic book. SV fails in this regard. Mr. Register has a vivid imagination, but has failed to translate his ideas into a coherent form. Coupled with this is the typical lack of care shown by [Task Force Games] in proofreading, editing, and organizing their products. The combination is deadly. Avoid Supervillains."

In his 1990 book The Complete Guide to Role-Playing Games, game critic Rick Swan questioned whether this was a role-playing game at all, writing, "there's a lot more board-gaming than role-playing, and it's dismal board-gaming at that." Swan found the rules were "so full of holes that the players are virtually forced to invent their own game." Swan concluded by giving this game a dismal rating of only 1 out of 4.
