= Spellbinder (board game) =

Board wargame published in 1980

Cover art by Alvin Bellflower, 1980

Spellbinder is a fantasy microgame published by Task Force Games in 1980 in which wizards compete to conquer the central castle.

== Description ==
Spellbinder is a 2–4 player game in which each player controls a wizard. Yamantsar, the chief wizard of central Yof-Pintre castle, has departed to go conquering, and the four remaining wizards, who occupy lesser castles in corners of the board, each decide to take over Yof-Piintre.

=== Gameplay ===
Each turn, the first player is chosen at random. The sequence of play is:

- Movement
- Magical combat: Each wizard chooses a spell secretly, and the two spells are revealed simultaneously. Spells can cause damage to the enemy army, but can also backfire, causing damage to the owning player's army.
- Regular combat

=== Scenarios ===
The game comes with three scenarios:

1. Everyone vies for control of Yof-Pintre.
2. One player starts in control of Yof-Pintre and must defend it.
3. Yamantsar, the chief wizard, returns to fight the lesser wizards.

There is also a campaign game, which is to play all of the scenarios in order.

=== Victory conditions ===
Points are awarded for destruction of enemies, with the highest number of points awarded for controlling Yof-Pintre. The player with the most points is the winner.

== Publication history ==
In 1977, Metagaming Concepts published Ogre and pioneered the microgame, a small and easy-to-learn wargame, often with a fantasy or science fiction theme, packaged in a ziplock bag or thin plastic case. Several game companies responded with their own lines of microgrames, chief among them the "Fantasy Capsule" and "Space Capsule" microgames of Simulations Publications Inc. and the "Pocket Games" of Task Force Games. One of the Pocket Games line was Spellbinder, a microgame designed by R. Vance Buck, with interior art by Buck and Bob Bingham, and cover art by Alvin Bellflower. It was published by Task Force Games in 1980.

== Reception ==
In The Space Gamer No. 33, David Ladyman found many problems with the game and commented that "Despite the impressive number of names listed in the credits (including five playtesters), I get the distinct impression that this little [...] game was not felt worthy of the careful design and playtesting most wargames receive before issue. I find it regrettable that Task Force's fantasy games are not living up to the reputation of their other releases."

Clayton Miner reviewed Spellbinder for Pegasus magazine and stated that "Spellbinder remains an interesting game for 1 to 4 players despite one or two glitches, and should provide players with an afternoon of enjoyment."

In Issue 27 of Simulacrum, Brian Train noted, "This is a fairly simple game that incorporates a limited amount of 'chrome' rules." However, Train felt that all games tended to have the same outcome, saying, "Because the victory conditions are the same for all scenarios, and the highest number of points are awarded for controlling Yof-Pintre, play becomes very stereotyped and all games involve one big battle in the centre of the board."

== Other reviews and commentary ==
- The Wargamer Vol.1 #21
