= Musketeers (board game) =

Musketeers is a 1985 board game published by Task Force Games.

== Gameplay ==
Musketeers is a game in which a game set in 17th‑century France follows the palace intrigues and sword‑fighting adventures of The Three Musketeers as they defend their queen and their country.

== Reviews ==
- Abyss #39 (Fall, 1986)
- The Complete Guide to Role-Playing Games
