= Ultra-Warrior =

Board game

Ultra-Warrior is a 1981 board game published by Task Force Games.

== Gameplay ==
Ultra-Warrior is a game set in the far future involving single combatants wearing environmental control suits equipped with energy barriers, and using powerful weapons that can alter the landscape during the combat.

== Reception ==
William A. Barton reviewed Ultra-Warrior in The Space Gamer No. 44. Barton commented that "Overall, Ultra-Warrior isn't a bad little game. Unless the idea of knights-errant jousting across the cosmos turns you off, you might find it a worthy selection for a quick play session with a moderate-level simulation."

Tony Watson reviewed Ultra-Warrior in Ares Magazine #13 and commented that "the game plays fairly well, the rules are concise, and the physical qualify is up to Task Force's usual good standards. Rather than being a bad game, Ultra-Warrior is something of a bland game, whose features wear thin after only a few playings."

== Reviews ==
- Adventure Gaming #7
