= Operation Pegasus (board game) =

Original Ziplock bage version, 1980

Operation Pegasus is a board wargame published by Task Force Games that simulates the 1968 Battle of Khe Sanh during the Vietnam War.

== Background ==
In early 1968 during the Vietnam War, a large force of the North Vietnamese People's Army of Vietnam (PAVN) encircled and besieged two regiments of United States Marine Corps defending the Khe Sanh Combat Base, hoping to draw American relief forces into a series of ambushes in a duplication of their 1954 defeat of French forces at the Battle of Dien Bien Phu. In March 1968, an overland relief expedition called Operation Pegasus was launched by a joint United States Army/Army of the Republic of Vietnam (ARVN) task force. But as PAVN forces gathered in ambush positions along the highway to Khe Sahn, helicopters of the 1st Air Cavalry Division inserted infantry into flanking positions, driving the PAVN forces out into the open to be decimated by supporting artillery fire. The operation broke through to the Marines at Khe Sanh in only seven days, inflicting major casualties on the PAVN forces while suffering only minimal casualties themselves.

== Description ==
Operation Pegasus is a two-player game that simulates the relief operation. Three scenarios are included with the game: the historical scenario, and two "what if" scenarios.

=== Components ===
- paper 16" x 20" hex grid map scaled at 500 m (550 yd) per hex
- 18-page rulebook
- 108 counters
- two casualty record sheets
- reference charts card

=== Setup ===
Vietnamese units are placed facedown so that their combat strength is unknown. The units are only flipped over when they become involved in combat, revealing their combat strength.

=== Gameplay ===
Each turn consists of:

1. American reinforcements
2. Helicopters: The American player has a limited number of helicopter points that can be used for transportation of new units to anywhere on the map, support combat, or observation. Helicopters cannot be used in consecutive turns — each must be grounded for a turn before returning to the air.
3. American movement and combat
4. Vietnamese reinforcement
5. Vietnamese movement and combat

Each game turn represents one day. The historical scenario lasts ten turns.

=== Victory conditions ===
For the historical scenario, only the American player gains or loses victory points based on casualties on both sides, the speed the American player removes mines from the road to Khe Sahn, and the Vietnamese player's siege effectiveness. The American player wins by ending with a positive number of points, and loses if the total is negative.

== Publication history ==
Perry Moore designed Operation Pegasus, and it was published by Task Force Games in 1980, only 12 years after the Battle of Khe Sahn. It was first released in a Ziplock bag as Task Force Games' 8th microgame, and then released later the same year as a boxed set.

== Reception ==
Nick Schuessler reviewed Operation Pegasus in The Space Gamer No. 35. Schuessler commented that "Operation Pegasus offers some interesting design innovations at the operational level, as well as an enjoyable game and a fairly good simulation. The game is a must for all contemporary era gamers, and the rest of us can re-live the famous helicopter attack scene from Apocalypse Now [...] Four stars."

In Issue 29 of Phoenix, Ed Easton noted that "Although the US player has the more active role in this game, there is plenty of scope for the NVA player." Easton concluded "Too often after playing a new war game I lose interest in it and don't play again for many months, but Operation Pegasus is an exception which I hope to play repeatedly. Task Force and the designer, Perry Moore, are to be congratulated on producing a well thought out game."

In Fire & Movement #84, Joseph Miranda wrote, "Operation Pegasus avoids the more obvious routes to the simulation, and instead delivers a game system that catches the flavor of airmobile operations [...] This is probably the only wargame which shows logistical considerations in a manner which has at least some connection to the way they are really conducted in the military." He concluded by calling the game "A sharp simulation of Vietnam era airmobile operations."
