= Nexus: The Gaming Connection =

Nexus: The Gaming Connection was a magazine published by Task Force Games. Publication launched in April 1982 and concluded with issue 18 in 1987.

== Contents ==
Nexus: The Gaming Connection included new scenarios for various games published by Task Force Games in each issue, in addition to strategy and tactics for their games.

== Reception ==
Jerry Silbermann reviewed Nexus: The Gaming Connection in The Space Gamer No. 62. Silbermann commented that "Nexus is what is generally termed as a 'house organ.' If you are a Task Force gamer, you will find that the good points outweigh the bad points, and you will probably enjoy Nexus. Star Fleet Battles players will definitely get their money's worth with this magazine. Needless to say, if you don't play Task Force games, this publication isn't for you."
