= Survival / The Barbarian =

Survival / The Barbarian is a package of two board games published by Task Force Games in 1979.

== Gameplay ==
This is a package of two unrelated games: Survival, a science fiction combat game set on an alien planet; and The Barbarian, a fantasy quest game. Either game can be completed in 15 to 45 minutes. The components are an 8.5" x 5.5" 12-page rulebook with full-color cover; 108 multicolored die-cut counters; two 11" x 17" maps (one for each game); an information sheet; all of the components packaged in a ziplock bag.

=== Survival ===
In the basic solitaire game of Survival, the player is the pilot of a scout spaceship that has crashed on an alien planet. The player must find his way across a hostile landscape to the nearest survival station, fighting off random monsters on the way. The game also contains a number of scenarios for 2-6 players.

Before play begins, each player equips their character with weapons. Combat is simple: the player is allowed one round of ranged fire, and then fights the monster hand-to-hand. Combat is resolved by using a single 6-sided die plus combat bonuses to equal or exceed the target's defense strength. Each successful hit deals one or more wounds; each character can take up to six wounds, with one wound restored through rest every third turn.

=== The Barbarian ===
The Barbarian is a two-player game where one player is Vaam the Barbarian, moving through the countryside seeking his grandfather's sword and shield. The other player controls the random monsters that populate the countryside. Combat is similar to Survival except that two dice are rolled instead of one, and Vaam can receive twenty wounds before dying. The Barbarian can also be played as a solitaire game.

== Video game ==
Task Force Games developed a 16K computer version of Survival. It was published in 1983.

== Reception ==
In the July 1981 edition of The Space Gamer (Issue No. 41), Aaron Allston had a divided opinion, liking one game but not the other: "In short, a beginning gamer will find Survival worthwhile; forget The Barbarian."

In the December 1981 edition of Dragon (Issue 56), Tony Watson liked the simplicity of the rules and the speed of the games., but found the plots of both games too clichéd. Watson also criticized both games as simply a series of dice rolls against random monsters — once the character's weapon has been picked, there are no other meangful decisions to be made in terms of strategy or tactics. He concluded, "Both games will please those people looking for something easy and quick, but gamers after a real challenge should look elsewhere."
