= Star Fleet Battle Force =

Star Fleet Battle Force main box cover

Star Fleet Battle Force is a card-based starship combat game system, produced and developed by Amarillo Design Bureau Inc. It allows fast-paced multiplayer combat between vessels of various factions in the Star Fleet Universe, such as the Federation, the Klingon and Romulan Empires, the Gorn Confederation, Kzinti Hegemony, Tholian Holdfast and Orion Pirates. The game is based on the races that appear in the original Star Trek television series.

[Star Fleet Battle Force] is a very intrigu[ing] mix of rules that simplify miniature space based games while maintaining a level of detail that preserves the flavor and excitement of the Star Fleet universe.

— Clay Richmond

The game provides a card for each starship, with the weapon types, hull boxes, victory points and special abilities - such as a Romulan or Orion ship's Cloaking Device - as well as cards representing various weapon types, such as Phasers, Photon Torpedoes and Disruptors. In addition, there are a number of special cards included, with various play effects per card; e.g., Klingon players are vulnerable to a possible mutiny, or the "Organian Cease Fire" card.

The game also contains reference cards, damage counters to be placed on starship cards to represent destroyed systems, and color starship, weapon and event cards. Seven fleets - Federation, Klingon, Romulan, Gorn, Kzinti, Tholian and Orion are included - the last two have only 3 ships each, the others have six. (Sample cards for SFBF.)

Rules are provided for any number of players from one to six, including special rules for solitaire play. The rules are divided into "Basic Rules" and "Advanced Rules" allowing players to learn the advanced rules at a pace that is suitable for themselves, and also include a glossary for those unfamiliar with the technology and terminology of the setting.

The following titles are currently in development.

- Star Fleet Battle Force - Carrier Force
- Star Fleet Battle Force - Strike Force
- Star Fleet Battle Force - Invasion Force
