= Federation Commander =

Federation Commander is a tactical starship combat board wargame system, produced and developed by Amarillo Design Bureau Inc. (ADB) It is designed to represent combat between vessels of various factions in the Star Fleet Universe, such as the United Federation of Planets and the Klingon Empire. The Star Fleet Universe is based upon a licence to use properties in the fictional Star Trek universe as it stood in 1979. Thus it includes the original series and the animated series as well as fan contributions but diverges from then and does not include anything from the movies or any subsequent television series. Much of the combat in Federation Commander is said to take place around the time of the fictional "General War", a large scale conflict in the Milky Way that involved prolonged conflict between a multitude of star-faring cultures.

Federation Commander is largely based on Star Fleet Battles (SFB), and carries over many of its basic rules and game dynamics. It was designed to be a game which would be similar to Star Fleet Battles, but which would provide more ease of learning and playability. It provides a balance between tactical nuance and ease of playability, in order to provide a game which is more accessible for newer gamers, or those with limited time constraints.

Some Star Fleet Battles rules were omitted from the game, in order to make gameplay more streamlined, and to eliminate some processes which some players found overly complex. Another motive was to make game rules and dynamics more understandable for new players.

== Game rules and dynamics ==
Combat takes place as two or more players each control one or more starships represented by counters that move across a hexagonally gridded map that may include astronomical features such as stars, planets and asteroids. Players captain their ships by allocating energy to movement and a few specialised systems at the start of each turn. The turn is divided into eight sub-steps called impulses in which movement takes place and additional energy is used to activate weapons, reinforce shields and use other shipboard systems such as transporters. Depending on the capabilities of a ship it is given a particular points value. This value is used to balance game play ensuring that one side does not have an overwhelming advantage over another and can be used to calculate victory points to determine a winner by totalling the value of destroyed or disabled vessels. Scenarios exist that allow variation in the specific winning condition, such as rescuing crew from a crippled ship, gaining sensor information from a planet, escorting a freighter or surviving for a specified number of turns in the face of unbeatable odds.

Information about each starship (or base or space monster) is fully contained on laminated ship cards (squadron scale one side, fleet scale on the other a single ship card). Colour-coded boxes over the ship's silhouette represent its weapons, shields, number of shuttlecraft, available warp and impulse power etc. for easy tracking during play sessions. Each starship has one diagram in a more detailed Squadron scale - the kind of scale seen in Star Fleet Battles - and another, more simplified one in Fleet scale that is approximately half the point value of squadron scale - a similar scale to the Cadet scale seen in SFB. (Examples of ship cards in PDF format may be found here.) Ship cards are laminated with plastic so that they may be written upon with erasable markers and reused, obviating the need to photocopy multiple copies of ship information.

Both scales use the same rule system, allowing gamers to play a fast-paced duel or starbase assault in Fleet scale, or a more detailed cruiser clash or squadron battle in the aptly titled Squadron scale.

A list of questions and answers concerning Federation Commander - and its differences from Star Fleet Battles - is available here.

The game uses much of the same mechanisms as Star Fleet Battles, such as power allocation, multiple systems, and ship maneuvering. However, it gets rid of some processes which some found burdensome, such as atmospheric maneuvering, and Marine guards defending aboard ships.

Power allocation is handled differently to speed up game play, in that power does not have to be fully allocated at the start of each turn. Players can make new decisions during a turn by using a "pay-as-you-go" power allocation system, which creates a more realistic feeling of actually commanding a ship.

== Game materials ==
Products for Federation Commander are broken up into a few distinct categories. There are boxed sets that provide everything needed to play including dice and dry-erase pens. "Attack" products (so named as the product title usually ends with the word "attack") that supplement the main sets with new ships, scenarios and specialized map board sections. "Boosters" that provide additional non-random ship cards, mostly duplicates of cards in the boxed or attack product with generally one or two new ship cards per booster pack.

=== Introductory materials ===
Federation Commander First Missions includes introductory rules for Federation Commander: Klingon Border, as well as ship diagrams for a Federation CA and a Klingon D7. It is freely available at this link (in PDF format).

Federation Commander: Academy is intended as an introductory mission, placed as an intermediate product between the First Missions PDF and the two 'border' supplements. It includes the rulebook from Klingon Border, and details for four starships (The Federation CA, Klingon D7, Gorn BC and Romulan KE) and a map. It is possible to use any of the other FC products with Academy as it has a full rulebook, but the idea is to buy Federation Commander: Graduation, the companion product that provides everything from Klingon Border that isn't in Academy (1" counters, mounted mapboards, 14 ship cards).

=== Boxed sets ===
Klingon Border is the original set released for Federation Commander It is a complete game that contains a 60-page rulebook, reference play sheets, map boards, several ship cards and two sizes of counters (there are no functional differences in the size, one being larger to include a larger colour illustration of the vessel). It focuses on the Federation and the Klingons as well as including a few Kzinti and Tholian vessels. Vessels include the Federation's United Star Fleet (including the fabled Constitution-class starship portrayed in Star Trek: The Original Series) and the Klingon Empire's Deep Space Fleet (including the famed D7 class battlecruisers, seen serving the Klingon and Romulan Empires in the Original Series) Two ship classes from the Kzinti Hegemony, the Tholian Holdfast's famed Patrol Corvette - the vessel from "The Tholian Web", an Orion pirate raider vessel, as well as a number of freighter craft, base stations, starbases and a space monster - the feared Planet Killer - are also included.

Federation Commander: Romulan Border is a complete set like Klingon Border though with an emphasis on different races. Romulan Border includes ship cards for the Federation and the Romulans with some Gorn ship cards. To lower costs to consumers who already own Klingon Border a version called Romulan Space that eliminates the duplicated materials (the box, map boards and dice and has just the ship and scenario sections of the Romulan Border rulebook) is available.

=== Expansion sets and booster packs ===
As the two main boxed sets have all the rules, including some specific rules for empires not seen in that particular set, any of the other supplementary materials of interest can be used. The various Attack products include rules for any new factions included in that set.

==== "Attack" products ====
- Federation Commander: Klingon Attack is a direct expansion to Klingon Border with 16 additional starships for the races from FC:KB, as well as new scenarios and two new map panels featuring planets.
- Federation Commander: Romulan Attack is a direct expansion to Romulan Border with further Romulan, Gorn and Federation ships and two map panels featuring asteroids.
- Federation Commander: Tholian Attack concentrates on the Tholians, and introduces the Seltorians to FC with rules for new weapons and the Tholian Web. The two map panels include pre-set web patterns.
- Federation Commander: Battleships Attack contains half as many ship cards as normal, but they are double-sized to fit the extra-large ships on them. Also included are the usual counters, scenarios and two new asteroid map panels (different from those in Romulan Attack).
- Federation Commander: Orion Attack returned to near the standard product format with 15 ships and a monster as well as counters for ships which appeared in several earlier products like the Briefing #1 and Booster Zero but contains no new map features. The pack concentrated on the operations and opponents of the Orion Pirates, a faction which have been seen since the original Klingon Border. Orion ships are unique in possessing a stealth coating making them harder to hit and in being able to be customised with weapons belonging to any other race (with a few exceptions).
- Federation Commander: Distant Kingdoms is similar in format to the "Attack" products, but introduces several empires 'distant' from the Federation: the Lyran Star Empire and other Lyran factions, Hydran Kingdom, and WYN Star Cluster. Hydran rules allow for the launching of fighter ships, called Stingers, from the larger Hydran ships. Due to the small number of resources on a fighter compared to a capital ship multiple Hydran fighters can be represented on one ship card.
- Federation Commander: Hydran Attack expanded the empires (particularly the Hydrans) added by Distant Kingdoms by adding 15 ships, belonging to those new empires (the Lyran Star Empire, Hydran Kingdom, and WYN Star Cluster) as well as including a new monster and ships for some of the older, more well known empires.
- Federation Commander: War and Peace introduces the ISC (Inter-Stellar Concordium) who set themselves up as peacekeepers after the "General War" that racked the other empires; the Vudar, previously a servitor race to the Klingons; the Andromedan Invaders, invaders from the Andromedan galaxy. The Andromedans have the unique property of not using shields for defense but rather energy absorbers prevent damage until they absorb more energy than they can use or dissipate.

Due to the additional special rules involved, the Tholian, Hydran and Andromedan empires are considered more difficult for beginners to play.

==== Booster packs ====
Each Border or Attack product contains counters for more ships that are included as ship cards. Federation Commander Booster Packs are small selections of ship cards (6-8) which are associated with a main product. There are three booster packs for each Border or Attack set. The distribution of the cards is fixed. Owning any main Border or Attack set plus all three associated boosters mean a player will have exactly the same number and type of ship cards as the counters in the main set. Boosters typically contain only one or two new ship cards with the remaining cards being duplicates of those in the main product.

Currently (February 2011) there are 30 Booster Packs associated with the various main products, as well as Line of Battle, a nearly full-sized product with additional double-sized cards from Battleships Attack, and Booster 91 which includes some iconic ships designed by Franz Joseph (the man who wrote the book upon which the Star Fleet Universe is substantially based).

==== Other products ====
Federation Commander Briefing #1 is a collection of scenarios and ships, many of which had been published places like Captain's Log but had not been in a 'regular' FC product before.

Federation Commander Briefing #2 focuses on adding ships from the 'middle years', as the game terms the period of the television series, alongside scenarios from the same period.

New scenarios and a selection of ship cards are available from the publisher's website.

A series of related miniature box sets are scheduled for release alongside each title release. Due for release alongside Klingon Border was a Federation and a Klingon fleet set, as well as a set containing the other warships, freighters and bases seen in FC:KB. A similar set of box sets, with matching ships for Klingon Attack, Booster Zero, Romulan Border, Romulan Attack and Tholian Attack have also been released.

=== Future releases ===
Planned future releases include:

Federation Commander: Borders of Madness will include several ships in both starship scales from Star Fleet Battles which will not be included in the main Federation Commander releases, such as the Galactic survey cruisers, scout vessels, commando starships, space control ships (dreadnoughts serving as home vessels for fighter craft and fast patrol craft), and the fabled fighters and carriers.

Also, many rules which have been excluded from the main Federation Commander modules will be included for those who wish to use them. In contrast to the step-by-step release schedule for various races in the main line FC sets, each race seen in SFB which will have a representation in Borders of Madness will be included in the first module.

As this game is intended for an audience already familiar with SFB, this release will be primarily available from ADB's mail order site. There is no current hard 'plan' on what will be done, or when the product will be worked on, much less released.

Some other titles have been reserved for future development, but have not yet been assigned to specific races or scenarios. They are:

- Federation Commander: Deep Space
- Federation Commander: Next Frontier
- Federation Commander: Gorn Attack

== Online version ==
Federation Commander On-Line is a subscription service which is part of the SFB On-Line service that allows players to play Federation Commander across the Internet. The client is written in Java so that it can be used on any operating system that currently supports a 1.4.x or greater Java Runtime Environment.

== See also ==
- Star Fleet Battles
- Star Fleet Universe

== Further information ==
- Official online game site; Contains huge list of resources, information.
- ADB's revised Federation Commander Home Page -more user-friendly interface.
- Federation Commander online - Various resources for playing online
- Player resources, SFB website various online player resources
- ADB's legacy Federation Commander site
- ADB's Discussion Board Federation Commander threads (old site, mostly from early 2007)
- Federation Commander webforums (current forums site)
- Federation Commander: Klingon Border at BoardGameGeek
