= Star Fleet Battles Expansion 2 =

Star Fleet Battles Expansion 2 is a 1982 expansion for Star Fleet Battles published by Task Force Games.

== Gameplay ==
Star Fleet Battles Expansion 2 is an expansion module which includes 19 pages of supplementary rules and errata, and also contains eight scenarios and three campaigns.

== Reception ==
Jerry Silberman reviewed Star Fleet Battles Expansion 2 in The Space Gamer No. 59. Silberman commented that "If you play Star Fleet Battles at all, buy Expansion 2. Actually, for [the price], this expansion is higher-priced than a lot of complete games, but for the avid SFB player, the money is well spent."

Steve List reviewed Star Fleet Battles Expansion Module #2 in Ares Magazine #15 and commented that "All in all, this is another tremendous load of grist for the mills of SFB fans. Players not already immersed in the nuances of the system are advised to steer clear until the contents of the previous publications have been mastered."
