= Stephen V. Cole =

American board game designer

- Born: United States
- Occupation: Game designer

Stephen V. Cole is an American game designer and the CEO of Amarillo Design Bureau (also known as ADB or, incorrectly, Starfleet Games) which publishes Star Fleet Battles, Federation and Empire, Federation Commander, Prime Directive (a series of RPGs for D20, D20M, and GURPS), and other wargames set in the Star Fleet Universe. ADB became ADB, Inc., in 1999.

== Career ==
Stephen Cole is a registered engineer and former Texas State Guard company commander (and operations officer). He was awarded the Texas Medal of Merit with "V" for valor, a non U.S. military citation. While attending school at Texas Tech in 1973, he founded the company JagdPanther Publications, which published JagdPanther (1973–1976), a magazine which featured complete small games in every issue in addition to scenarios and variants for existing games. Allen Eldridge, who Cole had previously met at an Amarillo game club, joined Cole at his company a few years later. the company published several games separate from the magazine. Cole and Eldridge made the decision in November 1976 to close the company, and then shut the company down in spring 1977. They closed the company after paying all of its bills and subscriptions. JP Publications operated from 1973 to 1977.

In autumn 1978, Cole and Eldridge co-founded Task Force Games to sell games only to wholesalers and retailers and initially not to individual consumers. They started a "Pocket Games" line, with four science-fiction releases in 1979 designed by Cole: Starfire, Asteroid Zero-Four, Cerberus, and Star Fleet Battles. Cole had first conceived the idea of Star Fleet Battles in 1975, and finally published the game after obtaining a license from Franz Joseph. Cole's Valkenburg Castle was also released in 1979, and was the company's first fantasy game. Cole has designed over 100 published games on many subjects. He won two Charles Roberts awards for JagdPanther and several awards for Star Fleet Battles.

Stephen V. Cole took ROTC from 1971 to 1975 but the Army chose not to offer him an active duty slot and was placed in the inactive reserves, never attending Officer Basic Course (OBC). He has made claim to have taken US Army Command & General Staff School (a master's degree in military science) through the Army Reserve and the influence of his father, a serving Colonel in the U.S. Army at the time. He wrote and published the military intelligence newsletter For Your Eyes Only from 1983 to 1999. He was a consultant to the military and DIA during this time. He has written over 200 articles on military affairs for several magazines.

As the Pocket Games line ended in 1983, Cole left Task Force Games and formed the new company Amarillo Design Bureau, which would be his design house for more Star Fleet Battles products. Through the Amarillo Design Bureau, Cole continued to support Star Fleet Battles heavily. After Task Force Games was sold to John Olsen in April 1990, Olsen relocated the company back to Amarillo so that they could better coordinate with Cole. Task Force Games refocused on Star Fleet Battles beginning with Cole's Star Fleet Battles Captain's Edition Basic Set in 1990. Cole took over publishing Star Fleet Battles in 1999, and in the process made Amarillo Design Bureau into a corporation. Star Fleet Battles continues to be published by Amarillo Design Bureau and was inducted into the Academy of Adventure Gaming, Arts, & Design Hall of Fame in 2005 where they stated that "Star Fleet Battles literally defined the genre of spaceship combat games in the early 1980s, and was the first game that combined a major license with 'high re-playability'."

Cole was previously a contributor to StrategyPage that "provides quick, easy access to what is going on in military affairs."

Cole has been married since 1979 to Leanna. They have owned several Felis bengalensis wildcat crossbreeds. Cole regularly visits the Wild Spirit Wolf Sanctuary where he gives talks on wolf nutrition and behavior as Chef Steve.

== Bibliography ==
- Star Fleet Battles: A Captain's Log #14 - Betrayal at Oxvind V (Paperback - 1994)
- Captains Log Trek Star Fleet (Paperback - Jan 1, 1993)
- Introduction to Star Fleet Battles (Paperback)
- Star Fleet Battles: The Best of NEXUS (Captain's Edition, Captain's Log #13), with Steven P. Petrick (Paperback - Nov 14, 1993)
- Star Fleet Battles Captain's Log #15, with Steven P. Petrick (Paperback - 1994)
- Star Fleet Battles Advanced Fighters Captain's Module J2 (Paperback - 2002)
