= Star Fleet Battles =

1979 Star Trek board game

- Star Fleet Battles Basic Set
- Publishers: Amarillo Design Bureau
- Publication: 1979
- Genres: Science fiction, wargame

Star Fleet Battles (SFB) is a tactical board wargame set in an offshoot of the Star Trek setting called the Star Fleet Universe. Originally created in 1979 by Stephen V. Cole, it has had four major editions. The current edition is published by Amarillo Design Bureau as Star Fleet Battles, Captain's Edition.

Star Fleet Battles is a ship-to-ship warfare simulation game, which uses cardboard counters to represent the ships, shuttles, seeking weapons, terrain, and information on a hexagonal map. It is a game system for two or more players (there are some solitaire scenarios). Typically, a player will have one ship in a game, though they can control an entire fleet, if they can keep track of the paperwork and options involved; multiple players can play as teams, with each team splitting up the work of running a squadron or fleet, or a 'free-for-all' fight can be run. Ships represented in the game are typically starships from such classic Star Trek powers as the Federation, Romulan Star Empire, Klingon Empire, or purely Star Fleet Universe creations such as the Hydran Kingdom or Interstellar Concordium.

The game system uses an impulse-based turn system, which is a departure from the traditional I-Go You-Go alternating system used by most wargames. A ship's speed determines how often and when it can move based on a 32 impulse movement chart. Generally, a unit only moves one hex at a time, making 32 the maximum 'speed' in the game. Similar systems are used in games such as Steve Jackson's Car Wars (which uses a 5 phase system) and is designed to more realistically simulate unit movement in an environment where the units can move a great distance in the time needed for non-movement functions (like weapons fire) to occur.

== Overview ==
Star Fleet Battles was based on the Star Trek universe as of 1979 and includes elements of Star Trek: The Original Series and Star Trek: The Animated Series. Federation elements were heavily based on concepts from The Star Trek Star Fleet Technical Manual. Unlike the mainstream Star Trek universe, Star Fleet Battles seems to consider some, but not all of The Animated Series, as being a canon material source, thus leading to the inclusion of aliens such as the Kzinti.

Since the first publication of the game, Star Fleet Battles and the Star Trek universe have diverged considerably as the authors of the game and those of the films and television series have basically ignored each other. The resulting divergent world of Star Fleet Battles is known as the "Star Fleet Universe".

There are several notable games set in this universe, including the video game series Starfleet Command (which combines parts of SFU with parts of canon Star Trek), the role-playing game setting Prime Directive, (currently available for the GURPS and d20 systems), the card game Star Fleet Battle Force, and the strategy game Federation and Empire, as well as the recently released Federation Commander.

The license Star Fleet Battles operates under does not allow for direct reference to the characters and detailed events of the Original Series. As such, official material does not include references to Kirk, Spock or use the USS Enterprise directly, though the latter is included in ship listings. This has not prevented oblique references, such as a comment about the first Gorn-Federation meeting as involving “two young captains who fired first, and faced embarrassing questions later.” Other references are monster scenarios loosely based on the planet killer from "The Doomsday Machine" and the space amoeba from "The Immunity Syndrome".

== History ==
=== Pocket Edition ===
Star Fleet Battles was originally published as a 'pocket-game' in a ziplock bag as "Task Force Game #4" by Task Force Games in 1979. Steve Cole later recalled:

The design of Star Fleet Battles began during 1975... Jim Brown... and I were playing a lot of Jutland.... One afternoon I was studying the Jutland battle that was in progress on my floor (left from the previous evening) when the [Star Trek] re-run of the day came on. I began to consider the possibility of doing a space game on the Jutland system. JagdPanther was in operation at the time, and I had vague thoughts that I could somehow get a license for the game.

By the time Jim came by to collect me for dinner, I had a Federation CA and a Klingon D7 fighting it out. In the brief space of an hour long re-run, I had two SSD's, the proportional movement system, and the charts for phasers and disruptor bolts. All were to change drastically within a week and were to continue evolving for five years, but the start was made.

The company JagdPanther closed down before SFB was finished, but the game was not forgotten, and when Steve Cole and Allen Eldridge decided to start a new company (Task Force Games) Star Fleet Battles was one of several half-finished designs proposed to be published by them.

While the initial format was small, and the number of ships limited, the game was still not simple. This was dictated in part by a desire to do the "definitive Star Fleet game". This meant that it included as much detail as possible from all the source material available. In the mid-70s, this meant the original two series and a number of fan publications. Except for The Original Series itself, none of these materials are considered canon today, but at the time, they were all considered fairly authoritative, especially the Star Fleet Technical Manual by Franz Joseph, which had originally been blessed by Gene Roddenberry, and from whom Steve Cole got the license to do a Star Trek game.

Elements of these fan productions shaped many aspects of the game. The Technical Manual itself decided the main functions of the Federation Heavy Cruiser, and what other Federation ships looked like. A set of blueprints (probably those drawn by Michael McMaster in 1975) showed the Klingon D7 as having more phasers than the Heavy Cruiser, and disruptors mounted on the engines. The latter became a common feature of Klingon shipbuilding, and the former led to the idea of less powerful phasers for the Klingons. The same blueprints also stated that an older, slightly inferior version of the D7, the D6, was what was sold to the Romulans, and the D7/D6 dichotomy has been at the heart of the Klingon fleet in the game ever since. Two of the novels gave mention of a phaser being mounted on shuttlecraft. This was included, as much to give a reason to use shuttles as anything else. This proved to be the wedge that allowed the introduction of fighters to the game; a feature popular with many players, but also led many to believe that Star Fleet Battles was no longer Star Trek.

=== Designer's Edition ===
Later in 1979, Star Fleet Battles was re-released in a boxed set known as the Designer's Edition. The original plan had been to produce "three interlocking games, all to be published in the 'pocket' format. When 'completed' this trilogy would cover the entire system."

However, the real reason for this plan was that it had been impossible to acquire boxes at an affordable price. When a source of boxes was found, it was decided to do a revised, expanded version instead. The box contained about twice as many ships and scenarios as the original Pocket Edition, and was expanded upon itself by three expansions in the same zip-lock format as the original (named Star Fleet Battles Expansion #1, Expansion #2, and Expansion #3), all of which were reviewed in issues of The Space Gamer.

These expansions rapidly added many new ships and concepts to the system which are parts of it to this day: The Hydrans, Andromedans and Lyrans were introduced as new empires that fielded novel technologies peculiar to themselves. All the races were issued a full complement of ship classes, particularly dreadnoughts, fleet tugs and scouts, which in the Designer Edition only the Federation and Klingons deployed. Notably, only the Klingon Empire built the superheavy 'Battleship' B10 class (in the Captain's Edition Module R5 the other races were presented with conjectural i.e. non-historical battleship designs). Heavy cruisers, the starship class the game was based on, were supplemented by 'wartime construction cruisers' (simply called 'war cruisers'), relatively inexpensive substitutes built on light cruiser hulls yet packing the firepower of their larger stablemates. All fleets deployed 'Command Cruisers' which were heavy cruisers with additional weapons and power, and some races deployed 'Leader' versions of smaller classes, such as destroyers or frigates. Carrier starships with attack shuttles (usually called fighters) became common throughout the Alpha Quadrant; in the Designer Edition the Attack Shuttle Carrier was unique to the Kzinti Hegemony. In the final years of the General War so-called 'Pseudo-Fighters' (later renamed 'fast patrol' ships; but retaining the 'PF' designation) were expendable 'attrition units' (like attack shuttles/fighters but larger with their own ship system displays) that operated from tenders, bases, or planets and hunted in flotillas of six. 'X-ships' or 'up-rated cruisers' featured altogether new technologies (like fast-loading torpedoes, overloaded phasers, oversize warp engines and high-capacity battery reserve power) based on the new versions of the Enterprise and Klingon battlecruisers seen in Star Trek: The Motion Picture.

All races built 'Battle Stations', which were upgrades to the Base Stations deployed on territorial borders that were presented in the Pocket Edition (for their Starbases, each race used a modified generic SSD in the Designer Edition). Each race also received auxiliary units that used generic SSDs, such as police ships, freighters, Q-ships, Fleet Repair Docks and minelayers, for which comprehensive mine warfare rules were introduced. Until that point, the only mines were the Romulan-unique “nuclear space mine” (NSM) and the smaller “transporter bomb” (T-bomb) used by all races.

Many things were re-written, and each expansion included new elements that impacted how previous rules interacted, demanding a great deal of errata and making the entire system something of a jumble. "It was clear that issuing yet another 'expansion kit' that devoted half of its space to correcting previous products was not the answer."

=== Commander's Edition ===
Commander's Edition Logo

Commander's Edition was, effectively, a ground-up rewrite of the rules. The old rule-number system was discarded in favor of a completely new alpha-numeric system. The three Expansions were scrapped and re-packaged. However, other than the new (bigger) reorganized rulebook, the initial 1983 release of the boxed set was mostly unchanged from the Designer's Edition, including the box (later printings labeled it Star Fleet Battles: Volume I). The separate Star Fleet Battles Commander's Rulebook was also available for previous owners of Star Fleet Battles, with a Volume II following in 1984.

Most of the material (including the new empires) from the Expansions was reorganized and released as Volume II. The bulk of the fighter rules were in Supplement #1, X-ships (now redone not to be based on ST:TMP and divided into two "generations") were in Supplement #2, and PFs (now renamed as Fast Patrol ships) were in Supplement #3.

From there, Commander's Edition came out with new products for the next half-decade or so. Two Reinforcements packs allowed the purchase of extra counters. Volume III added the Interstellar Concordium and the Neo-Tholians, as well as new ships and new concepts (such as heavy fighters). Nexus magazine was launched as a house organ for Task Force Games, and featured a regular SFB section which presented new material like scenarios, rules errata, and input and feedback from players. Similar material was also published in ADB's in-house (but widely distributed) Starletter newsletter from 1982.

Of lasting importance was the launch of Captain's Log, a continuing semi-periodical journal dedicated to Star Fleet Battles that is still running. It was noteworthy that the game developers at ADB were very receptive to input and feedback from SFB gamers. For instance there were complaints that the Hydran Fusion Beam was too weak, and so the game designers changed the rules so that charged Fusion Beams could be held over from turn to turn. Another example was the many complaints that Plasma Torpedoes were too unwieldy to use as seeking weapons, and so the rules were amended to allow Plasma Torpedoes to fire as direct-fire weapons (the Plasma Bolt).

The 'Commander's SSD' (Ship System Display) was introduced. SSDs had just been a half-sheet diagram of the ship's systems. Some combined ship classes that were differentiated using shaded boxes which were to be ignored to represent the smaller ship class (for instance the Klingon D6 and D7 cruisers were presented on the same SSD sheet with shaded boxes indicating the phasers and shield boxes that the D6 lacked). The new Commander's style SSDs (which did not appear in Volume I or II) took a full sheet and included extra record-keeping information, such as tracks for drone ammo and shuttles, and firing charts for all the weapons on the ship. A line of nine Commander's SSD Books were produced, the first few of which were mostly involved presenting new-style SSDs for the older ships, the last several of which had all new material.

During this entire period, there had been a constant stream of Errata, and later Addenda (which amounted to the same thing). For a long time, the vast majority of the mail received was from the top few fanatical SFB players, who constantly campaigned for new rules, rules fixes, and rules changes. This became a source of discontent for most of the rest of the players, who did not appreciate a game that changed every few months, and needed a sheaf of notes along with the voluminous rules. However, it was generally believed nearly impossible to repair the damage by properly re-writing and re-integrating such a large and complex system into a new edition before doomsday, especially without bringing the product line to a halt while only new versions of old products were released.

=== Doomsday ===
Captain's Edition logo.

For a long time the 'Doomsday Edition' was a private joke amongst the staff that worked on SFB. Then it became a public one. Finally, it became an actual project in 1987, and the 'Doomsday Edition' was released as Star Fleet Battles, Captain's Edition in 1990.

The long gestation, however, did give us time to plan an all-new edition. The publisher insisted that we should reorganize the game system into entirely new products. This was necessary to present the material to an entirely new generation of gamers in a more logical format (and to make dealers notice that it was a new edition).

The changes were sweeping. There were two boxed sets (in a smaller format than former boxes), the first of which, Basic Set, was roughly the same as Volume I. The second, Advanced Missions was different in that it only introduced new rules and ship types (more ships than any other single product in fact), but stayed with the same selection of basic empires as the first box. Nearly everything else is labeled Module x, where x is a letter (and number, in a series), along with a name, and comes as a booklet of rules and a booklet of SSDs, with a sheet of counters and a color wrapper as the cover. The new empires of Volume II and III were presented in Module C1 and C2.

Captain's Log #8 devoted a substantial amount of space to explanations of exactly what the new edition meant, and how the new products would work. The release of 'Doomsday' was split into five phases:

Phase I was the Basic Set itself, which had been released before Captain's Log #8.

Phase II included Advanced Missions, C1, and C2. It also included several limited-run products that were meant purely to ease the transition for older players. The main one had the rulebooks from all the Phase I and Phase II products, so veteran players could get all the new rules without having to re-purchase the other parts. These were released in late 1990 and early 1991.

Phase III was Module J and K, effectively updates of Supplement #1 and #3. Both of these were released in 1991.

Phase IV updated the Commander's SSD Books into Modules R1-4. The twelve empires of the previous edition were divided into three groups of four, and their remaining ships were put into R2-4; R1 had generic units and play aids. These were released in 1992. R1 was actually the last one released, and came after the first of the new Captain's Edition products.

Phase V was a promise to continue developing new products once the transition to Captain's Edition was complete.

And the biggest change was: "We'll explain everything, but we won't change anything!" Doomsday promised an end to addenda. Loopholes might be closed, new things might still be added, but no previous rule would change as a result.

=== Interregnum ===
The new edition was a success, but could not stop the march of time. Wargaming as a whole had been on the decline since about 1980, and Task Force Games joined the list of established gaming companies that did not survive the '90s. The decline of TFG was gradual, and SFB suffered long before the company actually folded:

Ultimately, however, the publisher was battered by market forces, a few bad decisions, and perhaps a lack of focus. The game system more or less disappeared from the market by the end of 1996 when ADB was unable to design new games without being paid for the previous ones. Two years of tedious negotiations were completed in January 1999 and Amarillo Design Bureau, Inc. was born.

Since very early on, the publishing duties and design duties had actually been split, with the Amarillo Design Bureau (ADB) handling all of the product design, while TFG had published, and indicated what they wanted to produce. The end of TFG put everything under one house again, and ADB, Inc. spent some time picking up the pieces of nearly three years without SFB. The first order of business, in fact, was to reprint Basic Set and Advanced Missions which had been out of stock for about three years at this point. While they were at it, all the errata and questions were evaluated, and many sections of the rules were re-written in an effort to make the game clearer. These editions featured new cover colors and a '1999' legend at the bottom of the cover to show when they were printed.

The time period between the last products from TFG, and ADB's announcement that they had re-secured the rights to the system were not entirely without new material. Bruce Graw published Star Fleet Times as an SFB newsletter about ten times a year, mostly during what was afterward called 'The Interregnum'. Its run ended with issue 50 in 2000, as it was considered that the internet served the same purpose (a regular way for the fans to keep in touch) much more efficiently.

=== SFBOL and Print On Demand ===
Since then, ADB, Inc. has gotten everything back in print, released a number of new products, and has seen the number of SFB players slowly grow again. This is in part due to the fact that it has a strong on-line community, encouraged by the company forum, and the existence of SFBOL.

Star Fleet Battles On-Line is a subscription online client that allows a person to play SFB against other people on the internet. While it does still require a personal understanding of the rules to play, the client does contain all the record-keeping functions of the game, and provides for some easier handling of places that require 'simultaneous' decisions (which have always been difficult in normal face-to-face play). Star Fleet Battles On-Line was originally developed by Gregg Dieckhaus and Paul Scott of Online Game Systems and is currently maintained and supported by Franz Games, LLC

In the meantime, ADB continues to try to serve the SFB community with new products, and new ways to manufacture and distribute products. Currently, they only have to go to a regular printing company for counters and color covers. These are then stockpiled, and when an order comes in, in-house (black-and-white) printers run the interiors, and other in-house machines do the binding and trimming. This 'print on demand' process allows greater freedom in product releases, and warehouse storage, and all recent products use this system.

== Star Fleet universe ==
Star Fleet Battles has its own background universe giving the stories of ships and empires. This started as the distillation of Star Trek lore at the time of SFB's creation, but soon started adding its own touches to fill in perceived gaps. The 'SFU' now diverges sharply from canon Star Trek, as the producers ignored anything from fan productions, and SFB's own license does not allow them to use any new material from more recent TV or film series. The SFU has re-interpreted several things, and in some places only bears a passing resemblance to the show that gave it birth. The SFU now has a history that covers (in various products) a span of about 130 years.

=== Settings ===
While everything published for the SFU takes place in the same continuity (other than alternate timeline scenarios), the lore is divided across several settings that have little to no contact with each other. The vast majority of products published for Star Fleet Battles is set in the 'Alpha-Octant' (sometimes called 'Alpha-Sector', but that is actually just a part of the area covered), which includes all the races known from The Original Series. Other settings include:

- The Early Years - The era covering the emergence of the various Alpha Octant empires in the dawn of tactical warp starships, including two races (mostly) exclusive to this era, the Carnivons and Paravians. Other settings have subsequently included equivalent Early Years data, such as that seen for the Magellanic races.
- Omega (generally called 'Omega Sector', more properly 'Omega-Octant'): an area just as large as the Alpha-Octant in the Milky Way Galaxy, but with a more varied history, and separated from Alpha by a large void.
- Magellanics: The Small Magellanic Cloud has long been known as the place that the Andromedans staged their invasion of the galaxy from; the recently released Module C5 presents the history of the indigenous races of the SMC and the initial Andromedan conquest of them.
- Triangulum: an entirely new area, the Triangulum Galaxy, which has only been featured in the Module E2 playtest pack so far.

== Nature of the galaxy ==
In the Star Fleet Universe, the Milky Way Galaxy is divided up into 24 sectors, each named for the letters of the Greek alphabet. Each sector extends from the galactic rim, and inwards to where star density and radiation problems cause ion storms, precluding travel. There are five 'void' sectors (Epsilon, Iota, Pi, Upsilon and Omega), where star and planet density is low, and which tend to generate large ion storms and radiation clouds, restricting travel from one set of sectors to another. This leads to the sectors in between to be grouped together in (generally) sets of three, termed 'octants', as three sectors are one eighth of the rim of the galaxy, and which are sometimes inaccurately referred to as 'sectors' themselves.

The Storm Zone is unoccupied, as even bases cannot exist there due to the severity of the storms, and ships cannot penetrate the Radiation Zone. The Core of the galaxy has never been explored.

The five areas into which the Voids separate the inhabitable portions of the galaxy are the Alpha Octant, the Sargasso Octant, the Xorkaelian Empire, the Sigma Octant, and the Omega Octant.

=== Alpha Octant ===
The Alpha Octant is the primary setting of the Star Fleet Universe, being home to the United Federation of Planets, the Klingon Empire, the Romulan Star Empire, and all the other empires inherited from other Star Trek settings. It extends from the Alpha Sector to the Delta Sector, but only Alpha, Beta and Gamma (more specifically, the area covered by the Federation and Empire) have been extensively explored by the major powers of the region.

=== Omega Octant ===
The Omega Octant runs from the Void in the Omega Sector through the Psi, Chi and Phi Sectors (though Phi is mostly off the detailed Omega map, as Delta is in the Alpha Octant), and is detailed in a series of Star Fleet Battles modules (and a playtest pack for Federation Commander). Over two dozen empires have operated in this region; some remain a factor in the Octant throughout the modern era, others rise at an early time only to be crushed or sidelined, while still others only enter the scene at a later point in history. Notable powers include the Mæsron Alliance (a union of several species, like the Federation and ISC; its rise, collapse and renaissance helped define the Octant's history), the Trobrin Empire (composed of silicon-based life forms, who consider a 'Silicate Plan' to rule the galaxy as their only insurance against domination by 'carbonites'), the Probr Revolution (a species of genetically uplifted salamanders with an anarchist bent, who rose against their creators, then used their technology to forge their own empire), the Drex Unity (A civilization of artificial intelligence who dedicate themselves by defend their creator's homeworlds against any threat), the Sigvirion Expansion (a species of living viruses that take over and use other species as their hosts), and the Federal Republic of Aurora (a collection of exiles from several Alpha Octant empires, involuntarily transferred to the Omega Octant and forced to find their own way amidst the warring factions of Omega).

== Other galaxies ==
=== Andromeda Galaxy ===
The Andromedans (who were backtracked to a galaxy visible in the Andromeda constellation from Earth) were first contacted in the Alpha Octant in Y166, and in the Omega Octant in Y167; though they had already made their presence felt in the Lesser Magellanic Cloud. In Y188, they launched an all out attack on the Milky Way. They utilise technology unlike any used by known Galactic or Magellanic races, such as Power Absorbers instead of shields, which allow them to use incoming attacks to help power their ships, as well as the devastating Tractor-Repulsor Beam, which can rip enemy vessels apart.

=== Small Magellanic Cloud ===
The Small Magellanic Cloud (referred to in-setting as the Lesser Magellanic Cloud) is composed of three main regions: the densely populated Core (shrouded by a dense radiation shell), a ring of provinces with "standard" stellar densities, and an outer Fringe region where stars and planets are much fewer and further between. Beyond the Fringe worlds lies the Chomak Cluster, a collection of stars only recently (in astronomical terms) captured by the Cloud's gravitational field.

Module C5 for SFB presented five of the Magellanic empires: the Baduvai Imperium, the Eneen Protectorates, the Maghadim Hives, the Uthiki Harmony and the Jumokian Resistance. Others, such as the ancient Chomak Community and the reclusive Yrol Septs, await publication.

In the decades prior to the Andromedan arrival, several wars were waged between the three Magellanic Powers (Baduvai, Eneen and Maghadim), most notably for control of the strategically vital Neutral Worlds. Unfortunately for these empires, the Andromedans eventually sought to conquer the Cloud outright, in order to claim it as an advanced base of operations for their full-scale invasion of the Milky Way Galaxy. In the face of this common threat, the rival powers formed the Triple Pact: a desperate, and ultimately doomed, joint bid for survival. Once Operation Unity succeeded in subduing the Andromedans, the surviving Magellanic forces (which had held out in exile among the Fringe worlds) took to re-building their fallen empires, though it would take a long time for any of them to approach their former glory.

=== M81 Galaxy ===
The original location of the Tholian Will was M81, a galaxy outside the Local Group. Before the Seltorian revolt, it was controlled completely by the Tholians, with the exception of isolated nebulae from which the Nebuline species helped support M81 piracy. In addition, this galaxy was once home to the Bolosco Merchant Guilds, later found in the Omega Octant.

The Seltorian Tribunal
After their successful revolt, the Seltorians kept the same basic political structure as the Tholian Will in place, just with themselves in charge. Fearful of an eventual Tholian return, they have sent out large nest ships as mobile bases of operation against any remnants of the Tholians they locate. It is unknown just how many expeditions were sent out, but it is known that one did go to the Andromeda Galaxy (and presumably did not fare well), as well as to the Milky Way.

=== The Iridani Cluster ===
Adjacent to the Omega Octant of the Milky Way Galaxy, the Iridani Cluster is home to one space-faring race presented in the SFB Omega-series modules.

The Iridani Questors
Otter-like party goers, the Iridani frequently travel to neighbouring galaxies, such as the Milky Way (most notably among the Omega races) and the Small Magellanic Cloud, in single ships (or sometimes in squadrons) performing "Knightly" quests. Their Cluster was conquered by the Andromedans in the Y190s, but there were so many Iridani in the Milky Way that their fleet was able to band together for the greatest Quest of all: the liberation of their home worlds.

=== Triangulum Galaxy ===
The empires of the Triangulum Galaxy come in two distinct flavors, with a handful of older realms dealing with the consequences of several newly emergent species making their mark on M33. Three of these powers (the Helgardian Protectorate, the Arachnid Worlds of Unions and the Mallaran Empire) were presented in playtest form in SFB Module E2, while the Imperium was previewed in Captain's Log #23. Many other empires are noted as being present in this setting, including the Human Republic (founded by a Terran colony caravan which was displaced from the Milky Way in -Y12). The Triangulum setting awaits formal publication in a "full" published module.

== Game system ==
=== Gameplay and mechanics ===
The Star Fleet Battles game system rests on several fundamental ideas, out of which the rest of the system grows. Part of the perceived difficulty of the game is that all of these are more complicated to explain than to use.

First, the movement system (and turn structure with it) departs from the traditional 'everyone takes a turn in order' structure used in the vast majority of games. Instead a proportional movement system is used, where a portion of the total movement (termed an impulse, 32 of which comprise each game turn) for all players is resolved simultaneously, so that each can see what is happening and respond to it. This avoids the usual problems with moving long distances without any fire or reactions happening, and keeps in mind that everything is moving at the same time. This system produces two important and well-known effects for movement: on impulse #1 of the game turn no units move (starships are restricted to speed 31 or less) and on impulse #32 (the last) all units move. The former instance means that speed-32 seeking weapons one hex from their targets hit automatically without possibility of interception, targets at the range limit of overloaded torpedoes (8 hexes) cannot escape before taking fire, and no ships have opportunity to turn fresh shields toward attackers before they can fire weapons. The latter instance means that even the slowest units in play make a move on the turn's final impulse.

Second, it is assumed that while faster than light starships produce prodigious amounts of energy just for the needs of propulsion, there is not enough energy available to perform every possible function simultaneously. Therefore, each ship has to fill out an Energy Allocation form at the beginning of a turn, and 'pay' for all the functions (such as movement, shields and weapons) that it can then use during the turn. This procedure forces players to plan their actions for the following game turn, because systems left unpowered during the Energy Allocation Phase cannot be used during the turn (there is a rule for Reserve Power which a player can use to power up some systems mid-turn, but this limited power comes from the ship's batteries).

And third, each ship has a display of systems (a Ship Systems Display, or SSD) that acts as a schematic diagram of a particular ship in play. Each class in the game has an individualized SSD, and most expansions revolve around providing new classes and 'variants' of ships to the game, with new SSDs. These displays consist of check-off boxes for all the ship's structure and systems (shields in all six directions, systems and hull damage, how much power the engines produce, how many transporters there are, etc. checked off when damaged) in the general layout of the ship, along with general reference information for that ship (tracks to check off use for weapons in limited supply like drones, shuttles, probes, plus weapons fire resolution tables, firing arcs, and miscellaneous ship data).

Fourth, it differs from many wargames in that each unit is not simply a set of offensive and defensive numerical ratings; rather, each ship has a variety of individual weapons and resources, each employing their own tactics and counter-tactics. Thus players are able to utilize, e.g., boarding parties, shuttles, tractor beams, electronic countermeasures, etc., permitting many more tactics than in the average wargame (and requiring much more documentation). It is this which allows the game to become a science-fiction experience, and puts it in concert with many literary elements of Star Trek.

Fifth, the game system is richly detailed and demanding of the players in terms of what might be called "situational awareness", particularly in directionality and proximity. Every ship/unit must maintain a definite "facing" (heading on the game map's hexagonal grid) which can only be changed sixty degrees or less at a time under strict rules (turn modes and the "sideslip" move). There are more drastic movement options available, such as the Quick Reverse and the High Energy Turn (HET), but they are limited by restrictions and risks of mishap (such as the always-dreaded Breakdown penalty). Adding complexity is the fact that the defensive shields of starships are spread around their six hex sides, most usually in an uneven pattern with the front (or number one) shield having most of the ship's shield boxes. Each hexside around the ship towards its rear usually has fewer boxes for absorbing damage before incoming weapons fire begins scoring "internal hits" on the starship proper. Furthermore, direct-fire weapons (as opposed to seeking weapons, such as drones or plasma torpedoes) have a prescribed arc of fire and each type of weapon (such as photon torpedoes, phasers, fusion beams, etc.) has its own peculiar "bands" of effectiveness within which its hit probabilities and damage ratings vary. This last feature of the game system is particularly stark with its provision for "overloaded" weapons, in which hit probabilities for targets at ranges greater than 8 dwindle to zero (overloads burn out past this range) and the damage scored becomes decisive; in most cases, overloaded weapons score double damage; notable exceptions include for Hydran fusion beams and the ISC plasmatic pulsar device (which score half-again damage) and photon torpedoes (which have a "dial-a-yield" feature).

The interplay between directional limitations for ship maneuvering, shield protection, and weapons fire makes for a practically infinite number of tactical permutations from which the ship captains can decide. Each ship maneuvers to present the strongest shields to its most dangerous adversaries, while at the same time seeking to generate firing opportunities for its most powerful armaments against the most vulnerable or threatening opponents. When more advanced options are added to the basic game system (for example, mid-turn speed changes and reserve battery power for last-moment overloads or speed changes) the gaming situation can become very intricate. Environmental factors like asteroid fields, planetary atmospheres, and minefields further diversify the gaming possibilities. Finally, multi-starship scenarios (and also those involving starbases, battle stations, or civilian convoys) can complexify the gaming experience to suit the tastes of the most sophisticated wargamer.

=== Rules ===
Since the introduction of Commander's Edition the rules have been organized with lettered major chapters, followed by a number to indicate a major rule. Then follows a decimal, and a series of numbers indicating the breakdown into subsections. For example, (D6.683) is the third subsection of (D6.68) Disrupted Fire Control, which is the eighth subsection of (D6.6) Active Fire Control, which is the sixth section of (D6.0) Fire Control Systems, which is the sixth rule in (D0.0) Combat.

Chapter R is an exception; as it is a listing of every ship type in the game, the number after the decimal is a sequential number identifier. e.g., (R2.12) is the Police Cutter, the eleventh Federation ship in the game; (R2.1) is background information. Occasionally, a chapter might have sub-chapters, which are indicated with two letters.

All of this is complicated, but is a consequence of the exceptionally wide-ranging nature of the rules, and the need to identify exactly what will happen under usually-obscure circumstances. To aid in this, a fair amount of the rules are actually dedicated to cross-referencing other rules sections. As it is, the designers made an effort to ensure that there are not any 'unaddressed interactions' between different rules; if there is a possible interaction, it is covered. The result is that many newer players can be intimidated by the sheer bulk of the rulebook. This problem is addressed in two ways; first, the Cadet's Game offers a stripped down introductory combat scenario that uses only the most basic of rules (for example, no overloaded weapons, no electronic warfare, etc.); second, the more-advanced rules are noted as such, so that players can ignore those they find too difficult or cumbersome without "breaking" the combat system (and some rules are entirely optional).

As all the rules numbers were kept strictly intact from Commander's to Captain's Edition SFB, the presentation of rule numbers occasionally jump around in current products, as they are presented in the products that make the most sense, rather than in the order in which they were introduced in Commander's Edition.

=== Formats for gameplay ===
There are three basic ways to play Star Fleet Battles.

The first, most casual, and most usual way the game is played among individual gamers not involved in regular group play is what's called the "Pick-up game". Each starship class (nonship units also) in SFB has what's called a Basic Point Value, or BPV. This is considered the "cost" of the ship, besides its value in combat. In the pick-up game each player or team is allotted a certain number of BPV (casually referred to as "points") to "buy" the starships and nonship units they will play. There are also optional items of equipment available that can also be purchased and added to the player's order of battle (including ship "refits" and sundries such as improved drones or fire control, mines, extra boarding parties, multirole shuttles or fighters, etc.). Availability of optional items is usually restricted by race/empire and the historical year of the battle's setting. Gaming commences when all players have "spent" all their BPV and gathered the required game materials to deploy their chosen battleforces. All players must agree on entry conditions for their forces (weapons status, hex(es) of first appearance, presence of "terrain" such as asteroid fields or minefields) and the "ground rules" that will be in effect during play (mainly which optional rules will or will not be used such as electronic warfare, mid-turn speed changes, cloaking devices, or the use of "transporter bombs" and mines). Several types of plotted movement systems are available in the SFB rules but most player groups in the pick-up game opt for the "free" movement method in which players proceed through the game turn without a prepared movement plot. Instead they decide how their units will move one impulse at a time. Typically victory in the pick-up game demands simple destruction of the enemy force(s) but players may devise other victory conditions by mutual consent.

The second way to play SFB is with the scenarios published either in the latter parts of the game rulebooks or the supplementary SFB publications from ADB (such as Captain's Log). The advantages to scenario play include assured game balance (they are thoroughly playtested by ADB) and speed of setup (nearly all possible play options are specified). Many of the published scenarios offer unique and fascinating conditions of victory that need not require destruction of the opponent, such as the rescue of a disabled starship or units stranded on a planet, the seizure of cargo from a contested unit or location, or merely the successful disengagement of some particularly valuable unit or units from the mapboard. A special category of scenario involves a "space monster" that is controlled by automatic rules, and is so suited for solitaire play.

The third way SFB can be played is the "campaign game", or simply a campaign. This mode of play involves a number of SFB tactical games that are played sequentially in order to simulate an entire war or theater of war between two or more game races (Federation, Kzinti, etc.) or teams. There is a "strategic" level game map which lays out the territories and borders/fronts of the races/teams, and indicates the economic and military resources controlled by each (homeworlds/capitals, planets, starbases, shipyards, etc.). In complex campaigns there are usually also separate records kept of national resources. Ships and other units are gathered into "fleets" and moved on the strategic gameboard until the opposing forces come into contact (almost always by moving into a single "battle hex") and then combat commences in the form of the so-generated SFB combat scenario. Ships destroyed in one game are unavailable for later battles, damaged ships are repaired, fighters and drones and other "expendables" replenished, etc. between battles. The vanquished forces of each battle are usually required to retreat, and the victor(s) are free to advance or withdraw at will. Play continues until one side is destroyed or conquered.

Gamers are free to devise their own system for organizing campaigns. ADB published a game reference specifically for various ways/methods of organizing player-generated campaigns. There may be as many "empires" or nations as players, or they may form up into teams, or a single player may be responsible for different races on different fronts (depending on how much recordkeeping and gameplay he is willing to handle). The players will need to devise their system for strategic movement and some sort of economic system for generating resources for starship construction/deployment. They will also need to agree to such things as what timeframe (year) the campaign is set in (this determines what technologies are available for play), how planets are captured, how bases are constructed, etc.

A more structured way to organize a campaign is to use the system offered by Star Fleet Battle's companion game at the galactic-strategic level, Federation and Empire. In effect, F&E becomes a scenario generator for SFB. This way the gamers don't need to "reinvent the wheel", and still can retain the freedom to modify the strategic system as they choose (by mutual consent). For instance, they may replay the General War, or instead play a "free for all" in which each race/empire may ally or team up with or against any race(s) of their choosing.

There is a different kind of campaign game that does not use a strategic gameboard per se. One was published in the Designer's Edition called the "Captain's Game". There was also such a campaign published as "Operation Unity", the push by the Galactic Powers to destroy the Andromedan starbase in the Lesser Magellanic Cloud. In this type of campaign there are a number of SFB tactical gameboards connected edge-to-edge a certain number of maps wide. These represent a "border" between two neighboring races/empires. The rules specify an order of battle for each side, and how they are to be deployed on each gamemap. A battle is fought on each map, and the victor advances to the next game map closer to his opponent's home starbase (or planet). Between rounds ships are repaired and replenished as usual. The game ends when one player advances to his opponent's home gameboard and vanquishes the enemy starbase (or if the enemy fleet is destroyed).

=== Modules ===
This is a list of all products released for Captain's Edition SFB, including a few permanently out-of-print ones, but excluding ones that have been replaced by later products, with the dates of all revisions of the product.

From Module H1 - Federation, Klingon, Romulan, Gorn, Kzinti, Tholian and Orion ship counters.

From Module H1 - ISC, Andromedan, Neo-Tholian, Hydran, Lyran, Vudar, Seltorian, WYN, LDR and Jindarian ship counters.

- Basic Set (1990) (1994) (1999) (2005) (2012) (SSD Book 2011): Needed for all other sets. Boxed set. Basic and intermediate rules, with a few advanced concepts. Has Federation, Klingons, Romulans, Kzintis, Gorns, Tholians, and Orion Pirates.
- Advanced Missions (1990) (1999) (2012) (SSD Book 2014): Introduces various advanced rules and ships for all empires in Basic Set. Boxed set.
- Module A+: Captain's Yeoman: Play aids. Originally Module A: Battlecards, published slightly before 'Doomsday'.
- Module B: Maps with pre-printed terrain on them (asteroid fields, gas giants...). Out of print.
- Module C1: New Worlds I (1991) (1994) (1999): Rules and ships for three empires from previous editions: Hydrans, Lyrans, and WYN.
- Module C2: New Worlds II (1991) (1994) (1999): Rules and ships for three empires from previous editions: Andromedans, ISC, and Neo-Tholians.
- Module C3: New Worlds III (1993) (2004): Rules and ships for new empires: Andromedans (bases), WYN ('fish' ships), Seltorians, and LDR.
- Module C3A: Andromedan Threat File (2011): Speculations of the Andromedan capabilities by the various Galactic intelligence agencies.
- Module C4: Fleet Training Centers (1995): Rules and ships for 'simulator empires'. These have no part in actual SFU history, but were published for new tactical challenges.
- Module C5: The Magellanic Cloud (2006): A new setting with new empires for SFB, all based in the Small Magellanic Cloud.
- Module D3: Booms and Saucers (1993): SSDs for separated Federation saucers and Klingon booms.
- Module E2: Triangulum Galaxy: Playtest/preview pack for a new setting with new empires.
- Module F1: The Jindarians (1995) (2005): Presents a single new Alpha-octant empire.
- Module F2: The Vudar Enclave (2005): Presents a single new Alpha-octant empire.
- Module G3: Master Annexes (2009): All the annexes (listings that give miscellaneous ship capabilities), updated for all products through the end of 2008, and contains some BPV adjustments.
- Module G3A: Supplementary Annexes (2009): Additional annexes not in Module G3.
- Module H1: Megahex (2005): Color 1" ship counters. The first two sheets are the same sheets that come with Federation Commander: Klingon Attack, Klingon Border, Romulan Attack and Romulan Border.
- Module J: Fighters (1991) (1994) (2020): Rules that detail the use of fighters, particularly in combat against other fighters.
- Module J2: Advanced Fighters (2002): Presents new carrier types, and several advanced options for use with fighters.
- Module K: Fast Patrol Ships (1991) (2000): All the rules needed for the operations of PFs, short-range, diminutive ships and their tenders.
- Module M: Marines (1995) (2008): Advanced boarding party and ground combat rules. Presented all as one perfect-bound book. 2008 edition features separate rule and diagram books.
- Module P: The Galactic Smorgasbord (1995): A medley of preview/playtest scenarios from planned upcoming modules.
- Module R1: Bases & Auxiliaries (1992): Extra ships, and player reference.
- Module R2: Federation, Kzinti, Andro, Orion (1992): Extra ships from previous editions.
- Module R3: Klingon, Hydran, Lyran, WYN (1992) (2000): Extra ships from previous editions.
- Module R4: Romulan, Gorn, Tholian, ISC (1992) (2001) (2002) (SSD Book 2010): Extra ships from previous editions.
- Module R4T: The Tholian Will (2021): Extra Tholian ships.
- Module R5: Battleships (1992) (1994): New heavy ships for most empires. First all-new Captain's product.
- Module R6: The Fast Warships (1995) (2000): New ship types for most empires.
- Module R7: Dreadnoughts at War (1999): New ship types for most empires.
- Module R8: System Defense Command (2004): Old ship types upgraded to newer technology for local defense.
- Module R9: The Ships That Never Were (2004): (And a few that were that shouldn't have been.)
- Module R10: The New Cruisers (2003): Variants for all the New Heavy Cruisers.
- Module R11: Support Ships (2007): Mostly non-front line, or 'support echelon' ships, but with a good number of combat ships as well.
- Module R12: Unusual Ships (2010): Over 100 ships. The good, the bad, and the just plain weird.
- Module S1: Scenario Book One (1992): Book full of scenarios, mostly adapted from earlier editions. Contains asteroid map from Module B.
- Module S2: Scenario Book Two (1994): Book full of scenarios, generally all-new. Contains 'Asteroid field' map from Module B.
- Module T: Tournament Battles (2000): Contains a guide to running sanctioned tournaments, which rules are used in tournaments, and SSDs for the balanced tournament cruisers.
- Module TR: Tournament Reference (2001): Gives all of the empire, weapon, and technology rules needed strictly for tournament play. (Also requires Basic set.)
- Module W: Space Battle Maps (2001): Large map with 1.25" hexes, and color cutouts for use as terrain.
- Module X1: X-Ships (1994): Rules for late-era advanced ships.
- Module X1R: X-Ship Reinforcements (2008): More X-Ships and associated support vessels.
- Module Y1: The Early Years (2000): Rules for early era ships from the dawn of tactical warp drive.
- Module Y2: Early Years Reinforcements (2008): Additional rules and ships from the dawn of tactical warp drive.
- Module Y3: The Early Years III (2010): Still more rules and ships from the Early Years Era.
- Module YG3: Early Years Annexes (2010): Annexes for the Early Years modules (Y1, Y2, and Y3).
- Module Ω1: The Omega Sector (1999): First in a series detailing a separate setting for SFB.
- Module Ω2: Omega Reinforcements (2000)
- Module Ω3: The Omega Wars (2000)
- Module Ω4: The Omega Rebellion (2002)
- Module Ω5: Omega Flotillas (2008)
- Omega Master Rulebook (2007): Compete, updated combined rulebook containing all the rules from Omega Modules one through four. Also included all material from Captain's Logs as well as new material including a complete and updated Sequence of Play.
- Tactics Manual (1991) (2000): Discussions on how to play the game well, covering general concepts and tactics for individual empires.
- Campaign Designer's Handbook: A 'how to' book for setting up a campaign system for SFB.

==== Master Rule Book ====
In the early 2000s, ADB started releasing a set of 'Master' products. These are intended as a compilation of all the system into a single source, instead of needing to either constantly refer to different products, or tear them apart to integrate them by hand. Existing products are:

- Master Rule Book (2004): Has all the rules from Basic Set, Advanced Missions, C1, C2, C3, J, J2, K, M, X, and Y1. It is the most up-to-date and comprehensive version of the rules available, but does not include ship descriptions, scenarios or annexes. Until the rest of the system is available, this is not suitable for a new player unless they have a friend who has those things available already. Replacement pages are occasionally made available. As this is a print on demand item, new orders are new printings with all available updates (2012).
- Module G3: Master Annexes (2009): This module contains annexes with information for all Alpha-Octant empires in every product published through the end of 2008 (including Captain's Logs).

Also planned are the Master Ship Book, a compilation of all the Alpha-Octant ship listings; the Master SSD Book(s); and the Master Scenario Book. A full set of all these products should provide everything needed other than maps and counters.

List of mods

- Star Fleet Battles - Captain's Edition Basic Set 5501
- Star Fleet Battles - Campaign Designer's Handbook 5715
- Star Fleet Battles - Advanced Missions 5502
- Star Fleet Battles - Captain's Yeoman - Captains Module A+ 5625x
- Star Fleet Battles - Module B: Terrain Maps TFG3031
- Star Fleet Battles - Module A: Battle Cards TFG3030
- Star Fleet Battles - Module C1: New Worlds 1 5601
- Star Fleet Battles - Module C2: New Worlds 2 5602
- Star Fleet Battles - Module C3: New Worlds 3 5603
- Star Fleet Battles - Module C3A: Andromedan Threat File 5635
- Star Fleet Battles - Module C4: Fleet Training Centers 5616
- Star Fleet Battles - Module C5: The Magellanic Cloud 5618
- Star Fleet Battles - Module C6: Lost Empires June-2013
- Star Fleet Battles - Module D1: Veterans Master Ship Chart TFG3551
- Star Fleet Battles - Module D2: Tournament Tactics TFG3552
- Star Fleet Battles - Module D3: Booms & Saucers TFG3553
- Star Fleet Battles - Module E2: The Triangulum Galaxy 7102
- Star Fleet Battles - Module E3: Borak Star League 7103
- Star Fleet Battles - Module E4: The Peladine 7104
- Star Fleet Battles - Module F1: The Jindarians 5614
- Star Fleet Battles - Module F2: The Vudar Enclave 5629
- Star Fleet Battles - Module G1: Master Annex File TFG5752
- Star Fleet Battles - Module G2: Master Annexes
- Star Fleet Battles - Module G3: Master Annex File 5423
- Star Fleet Battles - Module G3A: Supplementary Annexes 5424
- Star Fleet Battles - Module H1: Megahex 4501
- Star Fleet Battles - Module H2: Megahex
- Star Fleet Battles - Module J: Fighters 5604
- Star Fleet Battles - Module J2: Advanced Fighters 5619
- Star Fleet Battles - Module K: Fast Patrol Ships 5605
- Star Fleet Battles - Module M: Star Fleet Marines 5615
- Star Fleet Battles - Module MO01 Captains Master Ship Chart MO01
- Star Fleet Battles - Module MO02 Captains Commando Manual MO02
- Star Fleet Battles - Module MO03 Captains Starship Registry MO03
- Star Fleet Battles - Module Omega 1: The Omega Sector 5661
- Star Fleet Battles - Module Omega 2: Omega Reinforcements 5662
- Star Fleet Battles - Module Omega 3: The Omega Wars 5663
- Star Fleet Battles - Module Omega 4: The Omega Rebellion 5664
- Star Fleet Battles - Module Omega 5: Omega Flotillas 5665
- Star Fleet Battles - Omega Sector Master Rulebook 5670
- Star Fleet Battles - Module P1: Frax 3501
- Star Fleet Battles - Module P2: X-Ships 3502
- Star Fleet Battles - Module P3: Scenarios - 1 3503
- Star Fleet Battles - Module P4: Marines! 3504
- Star Fleet Battles - Module P5: Lyran Democratic Republic 3505
- Star Fleet Battles - Module P6: The Galactic Smorgasbord 5751
- Star Fleet Battles - Module R1: Bases & Auxiliaries 5606
- Star Fleet Battles - Module R2: Reinforcements 1 5607
- Star Fleet Battles - Module R3: Reinforcements 2 5608
- Star Fleet Battles - Module R4: Reinforcements 3 5609
- Star Fleet Battles - Module R5: Battleships 5610
- Star Fleet Battles - Module R6: Fast Warships 5617
- Star Fleet Battles - Module R7: Dreadnoughts at War 5621
- Star Fleet Battles - Module R8: System Defense Command 5627
- Star Fleet Battles - Module R9: The Ships That Never Were 5628
- Star Fleet Battles - Module R10: The New Cruisers 5626
- Star Fleet Battles - Module R11: Support Ships 5630
- Star Fleet Battles - Module R12: Unusual Ships 5633
- Star Fleet Battles - Module R107: The Nicozian Concordance 7107
- Star Fleet Battles - Module S1: Scenario Book #1 5704
- Star Fleet Battles - Module S2: Scenario Book #2 5707
- Star Fleet Battles - Module T: Tournament War 2000 5622
- Star Fleet Battles - Module TR: Tournament Reference 5624
- Star Fleet Battles - Module W: Space Battle Maps 0020
- Star Fleet Battles - Module X1: The X-Ships 5612
- Star Fleet Battles - Module X1R: X-Ship Reinforcements 5631
- Star Fleet Battles - Module Y1: The Early Years 5623
- Star Fleet Battles - Module Y2: Early Years II 5632
- Star Fleet Battles - Module Y3: Early Years III 5635
- Star Fleet Battles - Module YG3: Early Years Annexes 5425
- Star Fleet Battles - Deluxe Space Battle Maps 5310
- Star Fleet Battles - Silver Anniversary Master Rulebook 5412
- Star Fleet Battles - Stellar Shadow Journal #1 3601
- Star Fleet Battles - Tactics Manual 5703
- Star Fleet Battles - Cadet Training Manual TFG3100
- Star Fleet Battles - Basic Set Map 5501-7
- Star Fleet Battles - Basic Set IMP/DAC/EAF 5501-4
- Star Fleet Battles - Federation Master Starship Book 5432
- Star Fleet Battles - Klingon Master Starship Book 5433
- Star Fleet Battles - Romulan Master Starship Book 5434
- Star Fleet Battles - Kzinti Master Starship Book 5435
- Star Fleet Battles - Gorn Master Starship Book 5436
- Star Fleet Battles - Tholian Master Starship Book
- Star Fleet Battles - Hydran Master Starship Book 5439
- Star Fleet Battles - Lyran Master Starship Book 5441
- Star Fleet Battles - Lyran Democratic Republic Master Starship Book 5444

== Reception ==
In the September 1979 edition of Dragon (Issue 29), Tim Kask did not recommend it for neophytes due to its complexity. "There are quite a few rules to absorb and master, but it appears that it will be worth the effort... The game holds a lot of promise."

In the November–December 1979 issue of The Space Gamer (Issue No. 25), Kenneth W. Burke wrote that the game was too complex to be playable. "I give Star Fleet Battles a 'need for improvement' rating. In their desire to make an 'accurate' Star Trek wargame, its designers inadvertently let playability fly out the window." Two years later, in Issue 38, William A. Barton gave a thumbs up to the Star Fleet Battles Designer's Edition, but also cautioned that the complex game was not for the faint-hearted. "I'd have to give my whole-hearted recommendation to Star Fleet Battles. I find it a most satisfying game. I would, however, caution Trekkers who are inexperienced at simulations gaming to start with a less complex space combat game before trying SFB. But those of you who are old hands, if you haven't yet taken on the helm of the U.S.S. Enterprise or one of its sister ships, then boldly go to your local game store and pick up a copy."

In Issue 44 of the British wargaming magazine Perfidious Albion, Bob Collman reviewed the pocket game edition, and found the rulebook "a delight. It is clearly written, almost completely free of ambiguity and full of concrete examples ... Play is smooth but very detailed and takes some effort to learn." Collman concluded, "There are large numbers of decisions to be made, which I find an important factor in making a game fun. Skill is rewarded in this game and practice will be required."

In the May 1981 edition of Ares (Issue 8), Steve List recommended the game, saying, "Despite the minute details with which the player has to contend, this is neither a difficult game to learn (mastering it is another matter) or play as long as the player doesn't try to handle too many ships at once."

In the October 1980 issue of Fantastic Science Fiction, Greg Costikyan compared this game' to Starfire and called Star Fleet Battles "the superior game. It is quite complicated, especially for a micro, with 28 densely-set pages of rules." Costikyan concluded, "As a boxed game for $13, it's still worth looking at, especially if you are a Trek fan."

John Lambshead reviewed Star Fleet Battles for White Dwarf #27, giving it an overall rating of 8 out of 10, and stated that "I have no hesitation in recommending this game. The only word of warning I would give is that it may be a little complex for beginners or younger gamers (who might usefully look at TFG's simpler game on a similar subject Starfire)."

In the February 1983 issue of Asimov's Science Fiction, Dana Lombardy noted, "There’s lots of detail and charts to keep track of, but despite this complex design, the game has sold surprisingly well — more than 53,000 copies since being introduced in 1979."

In the June 1996 edition of Dragon (Issue 230), Rick Swan thought the 4th edition was a worthy addition to the Star Fleet Battles line, saying that despite its complexity, it was "an experience without parallel, one that can easily become an obsession."

In his 2007 essay, Bruce Nesmith stated "No other game in hobby game history so completely captures the feel of ship-to-ship combat in space than Star Fleet Battles. The fact that it does so in the Star Fleet Universe is icing on the cake."

== Reviews ==
- Analog Science Fiction and Fact

== Awards ==
Star Fleet Battles was inducted into the Academy of Adventure Gaming, Arts, & Design Hall of Fame in 2005, with the citation "Star Fleet Battles literally defined the genre of spaceship combat games in the early 1980s, and was the first game that combined a major license with 'high re-playability'."

== See also ==
- Galac-Tac
- Starweb
- Star Fleet Warlord
