= Amarillo Design Bureau =

Game design company

- Industry: Games
- Founded: 1981
- Headquarters: Amarillo, Texas, United States
- Key people: Stephen V Cole, President
- Revenue: $250,000 (Estimate)
- Number of employees: 5 (Estimate)
- Website: starfleetgames.com
- Footnotes / references Source Dun & Bradstreet

Amarillo Design Bureau is a company which specializes in tactical and strategic board wargames. The company is a successor to Task Force Games, and is owned and operated by Steve and Leanna Cole, with partner Steve Petrick, and based in Amarillo, Texas. The company created and developed the series of games set in the Star Trek-based Star Fleet Universe, under license from Paramount Pictures, which includes the tactical combat games Star Fleet Battles and Federation Commander, the strategic-level game Federation and Empire, the card-based tactical game Star Fleet Battle Force and the role-playing game Prime Directive. They also produce a large series of miniatures under the Starline 2400 and Starline 2500 label, as well as the biannual Captain's Log magazine.
