= Task Force Games =

Game company started in 1979 by Allen Eldridge and Stephen Cole

- Industry: Gaming
- Founded: 1979
- Successor: New World Computing
- Headquarters: United States
- Key people: Allen Eldridge; Stephen V. Cole

Task Force Games was a game company started in 1979 by Allen Eldridge and Stephen V. Cole. TFG published many games, most notably including both Star Fleet Battles (currently published by the original designers, Amarillo Design Bureau) and the Starfire series of games (which is now published by Starfire Design Studio), which were later novelized by David Weber into such books as In Death Ground, The Shiva Option and Insurrection. Eldridge sold the company to New World Computing in 1988, which became a division of The 3DO Company in 1996 and went out of business in 2003.

During the period that TFG was owned by New World Computing, the two companies attempted the first-ever simultaneous release of a board game and computer game. The two versions of King's Bounty wound up releasing about 9 months apart, and after NWC had sold TFG to John Olsen. Future versions of New World Computing's version of King's Bounty were called Heroes of Might & Magic to avoid confusion between the two very different games that had been designed by different designers. TFG never wound up releasing a second version of the King's Bounty board game.

TFG also published historical games such as Battlewagon, History of the Second World War, and McPherson's Ridge: The First Hours of Gettysburg. One game, Supervillains (1982), attempted to combine a board wargame with elements of role-playing.

Task Force Games also published a series of Pocket Games, their version of microgames. Several of these microgames were later expanded and released as board games. TFG microgames include:

- Asteroid Zero-Four
- Battlewagon
- Boarding Party
- Cerberus
- Checkpoint Omega
- City States of Arklyrell
- Escape from Altassar
- Intruder
- Moon Base Clavius
- Musketeers
- Operation Pegasus
- Prochorovka: Armor at Kursk (later released as the board game Armor at Kursk)
- Robots!
- Spellbinder
- Star Fleet Battles and later Expansion #1, Expansion #2, Expansion #3
- Starfire
- Starfire II
- Starfire III: Empires
- Survival / The Barbarian
- The Warriors of Batak
- Ultra-Warrior
- Valkenburg Castle

Many of the games were considered cutting edge for their time. One distinct feature that many of them had was that unlike many wargames of that era, players often had a degree of customization over their armies—For instance, in the Starfire series, a player could design every component of his starships, and in Robots!, a player could build his individual robots from a modular design, making trade-offs in price and functionality between different movement and weapons systems.

Most Task Force Games products were designed by Stephen V. Cole.

In early 1982, the company launched a magazine called Nexus: The Gaming Connection, which was published through 1987.

Task Force Games became the parent of AutoVentures and began releasing their products, beginning with The Road in 1985.

== Reception ==
In a retrospective review of the Pocket Games line in Black Gate, John ONeill said "Task Force Games had a huge hit with their Pocket games line. Shipped in zip locks bags (eventually shrinkwrap), and priced at $3.95, the games were designed to be easy to learn and quick to play. All told they released twenty-two, all but three with science fiction or fantasy themes, including many that are still highly regarded today."
