= Starfire =

Starfire or Starfires may refer to:

== Military ==
- F-94 Starfire, an American fighter aircraft
- Starfire Optical Range, a United States Air Force research laboratory

== Comics ==
- Starfire (Teen Titans) (1980), alien superheroine and member of the Teen Titans, appearing in DC Comics
- Starfire (1968), the original name of Red Star, a fictional Russian superhero appearing in DC Comics
- Starfire (Star Hunters) (1976), alien swordswoman appearing in DC Comics

== Books and games ==
- Starfire (board wargame), a science fiction strategy game by Starfire Design Studio
- Starfire novel series, in the universe of the war game, primarily written by Steve White and David Weber
- Starfire, a 1960 novel by Robert Buckner and the basis for the film Moon Pilot
- Starfire (Paul Preuss novel), a 1988 science fiction novel by Paul Preuss
- Starfire, a 1999 science fiction novel by Charles Sheffield
- Star Fire, a arcade video game from 1979

== Music ==
- The Starfires, a band from Los Angeles, California
- The Starfires (Cleveland band), a band from Cleveland, Ohio
- Starfire (Jorn album), 2000
- "Starfire", a song by DragonForce from Valley of the Damned, 2003
- "Starfire", a song by Low from Secret Name , 1999
- Starfire (Jaga Jazzist album)
- Starfire (Caitlyn Smith album), 2018

== Computing and technology ==
- Intel Starfire, a variant of the Panther Lake processors designed for spacecraft and orbital systems
- Starfire video prototype, an "office of the future" prototype by Sun Microsystems
- Starfire, the code name for the Sun Enterprise 10000 computer by Sun Microsystems
- Starfire, the computer-assisted dispatch system for the New York City Fire Department
- StarFire (navigation system), a wide-area differential GPS developed by John Deere's Precision Farming group

== Other ==
- Nuclear fusion, the source of energy for stars
- Oldsmobile Starfire, an automobile made by Oldsmobile
- Starfire engine, an adaptation of the Holden straight-six motor
- Starfire Sports, a recreational sports facility in Tukwila, WA
- Star Fire (wrestler), Mexican masked professional wrestler
- Starfire station, a light rail station in Rosemont, CA

== See also ==
- Firestar (disambiguation)
