= Loose Future =

Studio album by Courtney Marie Andrews
- Released: October 7, 2022
- Studio: Flying Cloud Recordings
- Genres: Americana; folk; indie pop
- Length: 32:31
- Label: Fat Possum
- Producers: Sam Griffin Owens; Courtney Marie Andrews

Courtney Marie Andrews chronology
Old Flowers (2020)	Loose Future (2022)	Valentine (2026)

Loose Future is the eighth studio album by American singer-songwriter Courtney Marie Andrews. It was released on October 7, 2022, via Fat Possum Records. Recording sessions took place at Flying Cloud Recordings. Production was handled by Sam Evian and Courtney Marie Andrews. It features contributions from Josh Kaufman, Jared Samuel, Dan Iead, Chris Bear, Colin Nealis, Austin Vaughn and Sam Evian.

The album peaked at number 74 on the UK Albums Chart.

== Critical reception ==
Professional ratings
Aggregate scores
Source	Rating
Metacritic	81/100
Review scores
Source	Rating
AllMusic	4/5 stars
American Songwriter	3.5/5 stars
Beats Per Minute	75%/100%
Gigwise	7/10 stars
Mojo	4/5 stars
Pitchfork	7.5/10
The Line of Best Fit	8/10
The Telegraph	4/5 stars
Uncut	8/10
Under the Radar	7/10 stars

Loose Future was met with universal acclaim from music critics. At Metacritic, which assigns a normalized rating out of 100 to reviews from mainstream publications, the album received an average score of 81, based on eleven reviews.

In his review for AllMusic, Mark Deming stated: "though Loose Future lacks a bit of the grand-scale drama of Honest Life and Old Flowers, it's full of well-crafted songs performed with the skill and passion they deserve, and it's another worthy album from a songwriter who only gets better as she matures". Grayson Haver Currin of Mojo found that the album "positions Andrews between Waxahatchee and Angel Olsen, a triumvirate of singer-songwriters finding new alleyways in and out of familiar territory. These 10 absorbing songs, likewise, are testaments to remaining in motion". Amaya Lim of The Line of Best Fit felt the album "embraces uncertainty and jumps headfirst into big emotions, but with acute self-awareness". Siobhan Grogan of The Telegraph called it "a gloriously mellow record, the sound of an artist remembering there's a life beyond her touring schedule and daring to enjoy it". Sharon O'Connell of Uncut saw it "not quite experimental, but there is evolution in this superbly judged set".

John Amen of Beats Per Minute wrote: "produced by Sam Evian, Loose Future is brighter and more buoyant than Andrews' prior output, the Arizona-born artist displaying her well-honed songwriting and impressive vocal skills while adopting a pop-adherent sound". Writing for Pitchfork, Stephen Thomas Erlewine resumed: "the smooth, radiant production doesn't amount to commercial pandering: it's assured, exploratory, and warm music that mirrors Andrews' newly opened heart".

Hal Horowitz of American Songwriter wrote: "it just over a half hour, the short but compelling set finds a generally chipper—if somewhat guarded—Andrews expanding her musical boundaries and peering cautiously to a brighter, more fulfilling, and looser future ahead". Dillon Eastoe of Gigwise wrote: "cosy as the recording technique is, Andrews is in a relatively playful mood, adding some analogue vocal effects and playing with old school synthesisers alongside the retro timbre of mandolin and pedal steel". Chris Thiessen of Under the Radar wrote that the album "invites us into a place of delight and reminds us that "These Are the Good Old Days", that it's okay to eschew the five-year plan and greet the future with open hands, that a gratuitous smile or warm song can be truly life-giving".

=== Accolades ===
Accolades for Loose Future
Publication	Accolade	Rank	Ref.
Albumism	Albumism Selects: The 100 Best Albums of 2022	75	
Good Morning America	50 Best Albums of 2022	44	
Rolling Stone	The 100 Best Albums of 2022	88	
The Fader	The 50 Best Albums of 2022	50	

== Track listing ==
All tracks are written by Courtney Marie Andrews, except tracks 1 and 9 written with Kate York.

No.	Title	Length
1.	"Loose Future"	3:28
2.	"Older Now"	3:23
3.	"On the Line"	3:40
4.	"Satellite"	2:54
5.	"These Are the Good Old Days"	2:35
6.	"Thinkin' on You"	3:09
7.	"You Do What You Want"	3:16
8.	"Let Her Go"	3:59
9.	"Change My Mind"	3:03
10.	"Me & Jerry"	3:04
Total length:		32:31

== Personnel ==
- Courtney Marie Andrews – vocals, songwriter, acoustic guitar, electric guitar, producer, artwork
- Kate York – songwriter (tracks: 1, 9)
- Sam Griffin Owens – acoustic guitar, slide guitar, twelve-string guitar, bass, Hammond organ, cymbal, producer
- Josh Kaufman – acoustic guitar, electric guitar, twelve-string guitar, synth, dulcimer, mandolin, harmonium
- Dan Iead – steel guitar
- Jared Samuel – bass, piano, electric piano, Hammond organ, synthesizer
- Chris Bear – drums, bongos, cabasa, congas, shaker, tambourine, woodblock
- Colin Nealis – strings (tracks: 3, 6, 9)
- Austin Vaughn – shaker (tracks: 8, 10)
- Heba Kadry – mastering

== Charts ==
Chart (2022)	Peak position
Scottish Albums (Official Charts)	28
UK Albums (Official Charts)	74
UK Americana Albums (Official Charts)	2
UK Independent Albums (Official Charts)	5
