= Elohim (disambiguation) =

Elohim is a Hebrew word for "god" and a name of the god of Israel in the Hebrew Bible.

Elohim may also refer to:

- Elohim (gods), "Sons of El" in Canaanite mythology
- Elohim, a 2017 film from Nathaniel Dorsky's Arboretum Cycle
- Elohim, a species of extraterrestrials that created life on Earth in the UFO religion Raëlism
- the Elohim, a race of godlike beings in the fantasy series The Chronicles of Thomas Covenant by Stephen R. Donaldson

== Music ==
- Elohim (Alpha Blondy album)
- Elohim (Aka Moon album)
- Elohim (Elohim album)

== People ==
- Elohim (musician), an indie pop musician
- Brasheedah Elohim, American-Israeli women's professional basketball player
- Elohim Kaboré (born 2006), Burkinabe footballer

== See also ==
- El (deity)
- Elohim City, Oklahoma, a private community in Adair County, Oklahoma
- Elhaym Van Houten, a character in Xenogears
