= Shape & Destroy =

Studio album by Ruston Kelly
- Released: August 28, 2020
- Recorded: 2020
- Studio: Dreamland Recording Studios; Hurley, New York
- Genre: Folk rock; alternative country; Americana
- Length: 41:42
- Label: Rounder
- Producer: Ruston Kelly; Jarrad Kritzstein

Ruston Kelly chronology
Dying Star (2018)	Shape & Destroy (2020)	The Weakness (2023)

Singles from Shape & Destroy
- 1. "Brave" Released: April 13, 2020; 2. "Rubber" Released: June 9, 2020

Shape & Destroy (also referred to as SAD) is the second studio album by American country music singer and songwriter Ruston Kelly, released on August 28, 2020. It followed Kelly's 2018 album, Dying Star.

== Development ==
The album was co-produced by Kelly and longtime collaborator Jarrad Kritzstein and is intended to document's Kelly's path to sobriety. Kelly stated that the album's title was inspired from the practice of free writing, which he sees as a means of self-preservation and catharsis. Kelly's father, Tim "TK" Kelly, his sister Abigail Kelly of Dashboard Confessional, and then-wife Kacey Musgraves contributed backup vocals to the album. "TK" Kelly also contributed on steel guitar.

A significant amount of the writing for the album took place at the home of Johnny Cash and June Carter Cash, with Kelly being invited there by close friend John Carter Cash, an experience which Kelly described as "transformative". He completed the track "Jubilee" at Maybelle Carter's dining table.

Of the recording process, Kelly noted that he wanted "to channel something larger than myself and give myself to the process as fully as possible, because these songs also become the story of whoever hears them" and that “Whatever someone might get out of listening to this record and hearing me express myself in this way, it’s completely theirs.” Kelly explained that he and the band had booked Dreamland Recording Studios for a week but had completed the majority of the album in two days, with Kelly stating that recording there alongside his collaborators "was a highly, highly powerful — without being overbearing — sense of energy. It was reaffirming in so many ways and like nothing I’ve ever been a part of before."

== Release and singles ==
Kelly released the first single from the album, "Brave", on April 13, 2020. On June 9, 2020, Kelly published the official music video for another song from the album, "Rubber". Pre-orders were made available via Kelly's official website, where various album themed merchandise was also made available, among which was a Shape & Destroy painting from Ruston's video shoot that sold for $3,500.

The album was released on August 28, 2020, through Rounder Records.

== Reception ==
Prior to the release of the album, Rolling Stone magazine described the song "Rubber" as a "meditative ballad that builds from circular, fingerstyle acoustic guitar to a spacious full-band arrangement".

== Track listing ==
All tracks are written by Ruston Kelly; "Closest Thing" written with Ashley Ray.

No.	Title	Length
1.	"In the Blue"	2:33
2.	"Radio Cloud"	3:32
3.	"Alive"	2:44
4.	"Changes"	4:39
5.	"Mid-Morning Lament"	5:13
6.	"Brave"	3:13
7.	"Clean"	3:17
8.	"Rubber"	3:18
9.	"Jubilee"	3:38
10.	"Closest Thing"	2:20
11.	"Pressure"	2:31
12.	"Under the Sun"	3:22
13.	"Hallelujah Anyway"	1:32
Total length:		41:42

== Personnel ==
Credits adapted from Tidal.

- Ruston Kelly – vocals, acoustic guitar, electric guitar, hi-string guitar, mandolin, percussion, piano, scratching, production
- Jarrad Kritzstein – 12-string acoustic guitar, bells, Fender Rhodes, electric guitar, Hammond B3, percussion, piano, background vocals, production, mixing, engineering
- Gena Johnson – background vocals, engineering
- Eli Beaird – bass guitar, background vocals
- Eric Slick – drums, percussion, background vocals
- Tim Kelly – steel guitar, background vocals
- Abby Kelly – background vocals
- Kacey Musgraves – background vocals
- Greg Calbi – mastering
- Steve Fallone – mastering assistance
- Ariel Shafir – engineering assistance
- Nick Steinhardt – art direction, design
- Alexa King – photography
