= Starfire III: Empires =

Starfire III: Empires is a 1981 board game published by Task Force Games.

== Gameplay ==
Starfire III: Empires is a game that expands the game system, and incorporates the tactical game of Starfire with a strategic exploration and conquest game.

== Reception ==
William A. Barton reviewed Starfire III: Empires in The Space Gamer No. 47. Barton commented that "Overall, Starfire III: Empires does a good job of what it sets out to do – complicating and extending the Starfire system into a campaign game. If such appeals to be, and you already own Starfire and perhaps Starfire II, you should find it worth the buy."

Steve List reviewed Starfire III: Empires in Ares Magazine #13 and commented that "Given an abstract combat resolution system, it could be a decent postal game played with a referee. All in all, it should be of interest mainly to fans of the existing Starfire games."

== Reviews ==
- Dragon
