= High & Low (album) =

Studio album by Caitlyn Smith
- Released: April 14, 2023
- Genre: Country pop
- Length: 44:43
- Label: Monument
- Producers: Caitlyn Smith; Ben West

Caitlyn Smith chronology
| Supernova (2020) | High & Low (2023) |

Singles from High & Low
- 1. "Downtown Baby" Released: March 4, 2022; 2. "Lately" Released: January 20, 2023

High & Low is the third studio album by American country music singer-songwriter Caitlyn Smith. It was released on April 14, 2023, by Monument Records and follows her 2020 album Supernova. The project contains fourteen tracks, all of which were co-written by Smith, who also produced the album. Conceptually, the album aims to represent Smith's life honestly, detailing both its ups and downs, rather than presenting only the good parts, with Smith describing the creation of the record as a "transformative" experience which allowed her to be more emotionally raw and take greater control of her music. In her interview with Atwood Magazine, Smith said, that when she told Shane McAnally, co-president of Monument Records about her intention to produce the album, his reaction was "You have to do it. No one else could do it except you".

== Background ==
Smith released High, an extended play which contained eight tracks from the album, on April 8, 2022. The initial inspiration for the project spawned from Smith getting the idea to produce an album herself when the COVID-19 pandemic forced her to abandon the extensive press and touring plans she had for Supernova. The title track was previously recorded by co-writer Miley Cyrus for her 2020 album Plastic Hearts.

The album initially was meant to appear in two-parts; the first part of the record being High and the second part called Low. However, as Smith kept writing, recording and producing, it became apparent that the songs on the album could not be easily divided. "At the time I thought, How does all of this live together? and then realised, Oh, it lives perfectly together because we are complex humans and we are feeling all of these things in one day. It wasn't intentional when I first went in to make the record to break it into two parts. It just became clearer as I leaned more into the process and it all just clicked into place so beautifully, like it was supposed to be this way."

The full-length album was announced on January 20, 2023, alongside the release of "Lately" as the second single. Of the album, Smith explained "Nobody can have the highs without the lows. When I decided to produce this album, I knew it was going to be a challenge — and musically it was a beautifully stretching & exciting experience. But it brought me into this unexpected season of life where I started facing all these roadblocks that were holding me back. Fear. Doubt. Denial. And I was really forced to finally bring these issues into the light. I went from hiding behind my songs to being able to say it out loud in the room — and that's something I'm really proud of."

Discussing the composition of the project, Smith stated that she had originally envisioned it as an album of two halves, with a "high" part and a "low" part, but gradually came to realize that all of the songs contained elements of both emotional states and decided that it would be a more realistic and enjoyable experience for the listener if they were mixed together on the track list.

On April 12, 2023, Smith posted a playlist of songs on Instagram that had influenced her during the writing and recording of the album. Artists featured included Chris Stapleton, Rufus Wainwright, Bonnie Raitt, Paul Simon, Sheryl Crow, Wilco, Tedeschi Trucks Band, Elton John, The Chicks, The Beatles, Queen, John Mayer, Eva Cassidy, Patty Griffin, Whitney Houston, Harry Styles and Garth Brooks.

The album's photos for the High & Low album were taken by Rob Morgan, former bassist and music director for the Minnesota-based electric-pop group, Owl City.

== Track listing ==
High & Low track listing
| No. | Title | Writer(s) | Length |
|---|---|---|---|
| 1. | "High - Intro" | Caitlyn Smith; Miley Cyrus; Jennifer Decilveo | 0:29 |
| 2. | "High" | Smith; Cyrus; Decilveo | 3:47 |
| 3. | "Dreamin's Free" | Smith; Shane McAnally; Lori McKenna | 3:39 |
| 4. | "Lately" | Smith; Gordie Sampson; Troy Verges | 3:27 |
| 5. | "Mississippi" | Smith; Decilveo; Jordan Minton; Verges | 3:48 |
| 6. | "Good as Us" | Smith; Dave Barnes; Ben West | 3:31 |
| 7. | "Alaska" | Smith; Sampson; West | 3:16 |
| 8. | "Maybe in Another Life" | Smith; Decilveo | 4:07 |
| 9. | "I Think of You" | Smith; Ruston Kelly | 3:30 |
| 10. | "Nothing Against You" | Smith; Matt Jenkins; McAnally | 3:10 |
| 11. | "Downtown Baby" | Smith; Thomas Salter; Sampson; Simon Wilcox | 2:48 |
| 12. | "Writing Songs and Raising Babies" | Smith; Christopher Lindsey; Aimee Mayo | 3:03 |
| 13. | "I Don't Like The World Without You" | Smith; Sampson; Verges | 3:14 |
| 14. | "The Great Pretender" | Smith; Joe Clemmons; Bob DiPiero | 2:54 |

== Critical reception ==
Atwood Magazine said High & Low "truly embraces the messy darkness and the euphoric highs". The music journalist Emily Frances Algar praised the stand-out track "I Think of You", a co-write with singer-songwriter Ruston Kelly, as being "the twin flame to "Maybe in Another Life." It's an overwhelming want to pull time and a person back into your orbit despite them having left a long time ago. It opens with a soft repetition of guitar chords, which feel familiar. The song jumps between present day and remembering past moments in a relationship which crashed and burned. There's an urgency and violence to her voice, and to the music, something that Smith hasn't shown on her other records."

== Personnel ==
Musicians

- Caitlyn Smith – lead vocals (all tracks), acoustic guitar (track 14)
- Tom Bukovac – electric guitar (1, 2), acoustic guitar (3, 5, 6, 8–10, 12, 13)
- Tyler Burkum – electric guitar (1, 2, 10, 11)
- Ryan Gore – programming (1, 8, 11), percussion (4, 7, 9, 12)
- Amanda Shires – violin (1, 2)
- Kristen Rogers – background vocals (2, 6)
- Jason Eskridge – background vocals (2)
- Tony Lucido – bass guitar (2, 3, 5, 6, 8–10, 12)
- Aaron Sterling – drums (2–12)
- Dave Cohen – accordion (3), piano (4, 8, 9, 11)
- Gena Johnson – background vocals (3), synthesizer (4)
- Justin Glasco – keyboards (3), bass guitar (11)
- Todd Lombardo – acoustic guitar (3)
- Garth Brooks – background vocals (5)
- Ben West – electric guitar (6), acoustic guitar (7)
- David Dorn – piano (6)
- Gordie Sampson – electric guitar (7)
- Justin Schipper – steel guitar (7)
- Cara Fox – cello (8, 9)
- Eleonore Denig – strings (8), violin (8, 9)
- Avery Bright – viola (8, 9)
- Laura Epling – violin (8, 9)

Technical

- Caitlyn Smith – production (all tracks), engineering (14)
- Ben West – production (7)
- Randy Merrill – mastering
- Ryan Gore – mixing (1–7, 9, 11, 12)
- Gena Johnson – mixing (8, 10, 13); engineering, editing (1–6, 8–13); engineering assistance (7), production assistance (11)
- Louis Remenapp – engineering assistance (1–6, 8–10, 12)
- Zaq Reynolds – engineering assistance (1–7, 9, 11, 12, 14)
- Diana Walsh – engineering assistance (2, 4, 6, 9, 10)
- Rollie Gaalswyk – engineering assistance (2)
- Matthew Buster Allen – engineering assistance (5)
- Zack Zinck – engineering assistance (8, 13)
- Joel McKenney – engineering assistance (11)
