= Dying Star =

Dying Star may refer to:

- Dying Star (album) or the title song, by Ruston Kelly, 2018
- "Dying Star", a song by Ivy from Realistic, 1995
- "Dying Star", a song by Ashnikko from Weedkiller, 2023
