= The Weakness (album) =

Studio album by Ruston Kelly
- Released: April 7, 2023
- Recorded: 2023
- Genre: Folk rock; alternative country; Americana
- Length: 40:51
- Label: Rounder
- Producer: Nate Mercereau

Ruston Kelly chronology
Shape & Destroy (2020)	The Weakness (2023)	Pale, Through the Window (2025)

Singles from The Weakness
- 1. "The Weakness" Released: January 17, 2023; 2. "Mending Song" Released: February 23, 2023; 3. "Michael Keaton" Released: March 16, 2023

Professional ratings
Review scores
Source	Rating
AllMusic	4/5 stars
Spectrum Culture	67%
Sputnikmusic	4.0/5.0

The Weakness is the third studio album by American singer-songwriter Ruston Kelly, released on April 7, 2023. It is a pivot from his previous albums, incorporating influences from pop punk and has a different producer.

== Track listing ==
All tracks are written by Ruston Kelly, with additional writers noted.

The Weakness track listing
No.	Title	Writer(s)	Length
1.	"The Weakness"		3:27
2.	"Hellfire"	John Chong; Bryan Dawley; Tim Kelly; Calvin Knowles; Juan Soloranzo	4:02
3.	"St. Jupiter"		2:21
4.	"Let Only Love Remain"		3:51
5.	"Michael Keaton"		3:19
6.	"Mending Song"		3:50
7.	"Dive"		2:15
8.	"Breakdown"	Nate Mercereau	3:04
9.	"Holy Shit"	John Feldmann	3:28
10.	"Better Now"	Matthew Koma	3:08
11.	"Wicked Hands"		4:37
12.	"Cold Black Mile"		3:31
Total length:			40:51

== Personnel ==
Credits adapted from Tidal.

- Ruston Kelly – vocals (all tracks), guitar (tracks 1–6, 8, 9, 11), baritone guitar (1, 2, 9); synthesizer, ukulele (6)
- Nate Mercereau – production, engineering (all tracks); drums (1–6, 8–11), bass guitar (1–5, 8, 9, 11), guitar (1–3, 5, 6, 8–12), Mellotron (1, 2, 4, 11), programming (1, 2, 5, 7, 8), synthesizer (1, 3–8, 10, 11), zither (2, 10), glockenspiel (2), mandolin (3, 8–10), harmonium (3, 9), French horn (4, 12), keyboards (5, 7), violin (6, 8, 9), organ (6, 12), samples (7, 10), drum programming (7), vocals (8), fretless bass (9, 10), percussion (10, 11), flute (10)
- James Krausse – mixing
- Paul Blakemore – mastering
- Bill Malina – engineering (1, 8, 11)
- Jarrad Kritzstein – engineering (5, 7, 11)
- Gary Paczosa – engineering (9)
- Aidan Thillman – mixing assistance
- James Kirk – engineering assistance (1, 8, 11)
- Sage Lamonica – art direction
- Alysse Gafkjen – photography
