= Valentine (Courtney Marie Andrews album) =

Studio album by Courtney Marie Andrews
- Released: January 16, 2026
- Recorded: Valentine (Los Angeles); Cobbly Casita (Madison)
- Length: 35:51
- Label: Loose Future
- Producers: Courtney Marie Andrews; Jerry Bernhardt

Courtney Marie Andrews chronology
Loose Future (2022)	Valentine (2026)

Valentine is the ninth studio album by the American singer-songwriter Courtney Marie Andrews. It was released on January 16, 2026, via Loose Future Records. Co-produced with Jerry Bernhardt and recorded largely to tape, the album embraces full in-studio performances.

Music videos were directed for songs "Cons and Clowns", "Keeper", "Little Picture Of A Butterfly" and "Everyone Wants To Feel Like You Do".

== Critical reception ==
Professional ratings
Aggregate scores
Source	Rating
AnyDecentMusic?	7.2/10
Metacritic	80/100
Review scores
Source	Rating
Clash	8/10
Far Out	3/5 stars
Mojo	4/5 stars
The Arts Desk	3/5 stars

Valentine was met with generally favorable reviews from music critics. At Metacritic, which assigns a normalized rating out of 100 to reviews from mainstream publications, the album received an average score of 80, based on eight reviews. The aggregator AnyDecentMusic? has the critical consensus of the album at a 7.2 out of 10, also based on 8 reviews.

== Track listing ==
All tracks are written by Courtney Marie Andrews, except "Keeper" (written with Kate York).

No.	Title	Length
1.	"Pendulum Swing"	3:22
2.	"Keeper"	3:12
3.	"Cons and Clowns"	4:14
4.	"Magic Touch"	2:59
5.	"Little Picture of a Butterfly"	4:45
6.	"Outsider"	4:06
7.	"Everyone Wants to Feel Like You Do"	4:03
8.	"Only the Best for Baby"	2:33
9.	"Best Friend"	2:52
10.	"Hangman"	3:45
Total length:		35:51

== Personnel ==
Credits adapted from the album's liner notes.

- Courtney Marie Andrews – lead vocals, production (all tracks); Mellotron (tracks 1, 2), piano (1, 4, 8), background vocals (2–10), six-string acoustic guitar (2, 4, 8–10), high-strung acoustic guitar (2, 8), flute (3, 5); twelve-string acoustic guitar, tambourine (3); Roland RS-09, flutter piano (5); Wurlitzer (6, 7, 10), prepared piano (6), lead electric guitar (7), Yamaha CS-50 (8), drone electric guitar (10)
- Jerry Bernhardt – production, bass, additional engineering (all tracks); high-strung acoustic guitar (1, 3); drone piano, glockenspiel (1); background vocals (2–7, 9, 10), twelve-string acoustic guitar (2, 3, 5, 6, 8–10), Mellotron (2, 3, 5, 6, 9), Juno-60 (2, 3, 6, 8), Bass VI (2, 3), six-string guitar (2), piano (3, 5, 8–10), high-strung acoustic guitar (3, 7), Farfisa (3); landscape guitar, prepared piano (4); Solina (5, 6, 9), fuzz bass (5); slide guitar, Rhythm King, snare (6); drone guitar (7, 10), tremolo guitar (7), fuzz guitar (10)
- Michael Harris – recording (all tracks), MPC programming (2)
- Travis Pavur – assistant engineering
- Sam Griffin Owens – mixing
- Josh Bonati – mastering
- Chris Bear – drums (1–5, 7–10), percussion (1, 2, 4, 5, 7–10), congas (1), water bottle (8)
- Wyndham Garnett – album photos
- Caio Wheelhouse – album design

== Charts ==
Chart performance for Valentine
Chart (2026)	Peak position
Swedish Physical Albums (Sverigetopplistan)	14
UK Albums Sales (OCC)	17
UK Americana Albums (Official Charts)	6
UK Independent Albums (Official Charts)	9
