= Starfire (board wargame) =

1979 board wargame

- Designers: Stephen V. Cole
- Publishers: Task Force Games, Starfire Design Group
- Publication: 1979
- Genres: Science fiction, board game

Starfire is a board wargame (a "4X", eXplore, eXpand, eXploit and eXterminate) simulating space warfare and empire building in the 23rd century, created by Stephen V. Cole in 1979.

== Editions ==
The Starfire game is currently published by the Starfire Design Studio (SDS), but was formerly published by Task Force Games. There are six editions of the Starfire game.

=== 1st edition Starfire ===
The first edition consisted of three products: Starfire (1979), Starfire II (1980), and Starfire III: Empires (1981); the first by Stephen V. Cole; the second by Barry A Jacobs, and the last one by the notable military science fiction writer David Weber. Later versions combined the first two into Tactical Starfire, and the third was largely rewritten as Strategic Starfire.

The original Starfire consisted of 10 two-player combat scenarios – designed to be played sequentially that involved maneuvering fleets of spaceships with different technologies, one of them human and the other "Khanate". The game also could be adapted for three players so that the humans and the Khanate encounter a third mysterious and even more technologically advanced race, the Ophiuchi.

Starfire II kept many of the same rules, but introduced the concept of small carrier-based fighters. (Reviewer Tony Watson likened Starfire to the battleship- and cruiser-based Battle of the Atlantic during World War II, while Starfire II was similar to the aircraft carrier battles of the Pacific.)

=== 2nd edition Starfire (1984) ===
Starfire, 2nd Edition (or sometimes known as Boxed Starfire since the first edition products were packaged in resealable plastic baggies) is a game of sublight space combat on the small-fleet scale. Speed of play is often touted as an advantage of the system; it does have a major advantage in fleet handling over Star Fleet Battles (Steve Cole's other starship wargame at the time), but there are many other games around of similar handling time to Starfire.

Starfire, 2nd Edition is based on the original version of Starfire, and on its sequel Starfire II. The rules booklet is divided into "modules". Module A is an introduction to the game series. Module B is titled Starfire and replaces 1st. edition Starfire. Module C is titled "Strikefighter" and replaces Starfire II". The 2nd edition product line continued with Starfire New Empires (1985), the first strategic-level game in the 2nd edition series, and The Gorm-Khanate War (1986) which was a campaign game using Starfire New Empires for the strategic part of the campaign, and Starfire, 2nd Edition for the tactical battles.

Starfire New Empires is a game of building a space empire, inspired by the original Starfire III: Empires. Players must decide what to invest their income in (colonization, R&D, trade, military, exploration, etc.) to determine both the nature of their empires and their ability to survive and conquer.

=== 3rd edition: Imperial Starfire ===
The 3rd Edition of Starfire is a boxed version called Starfire (i.e. Tactical Starfire) while the Strategic Component is called Imperial Starfire. These, along with Stars at War and Crusade were written by David Weber and produced by Task Force Games. TFG also produced Sky Marshal #1, Alkelda Dawn, and First Contact.

Thereafter, the Starfire rights were sold to Starfire Design Studio (SDS). SDS updated the Tactical Rules with the 3rd Edition Revised manual (3rdR). Sky Marshall No. 2 updated the Imperial Starfire rules making them more usable. SDS also released Interstellar War #4: Arachnids (ISW-4) (electronic only), which was written by David Weber and sold to SDS in a preliminary form by TFG; Insurrection (electronic only) is based on the book of the same name by David Weber and Steve White; and Shipyard is a computer program to speed the designing of ships. Admiral's Challenge is a small scale strategic game (actually more of an operational level game) that uses the tactical rules to resolve battles.

There was also a freeware 'campaign assistant' named Starfire Assistant, by a player in England. It started out with approval from the SDS but due to changes and additions not supported by the core rules it fell out of favor. It automated most of the record-keeping of the campaign game, leaving only actual combat needing maps and counters. It also allowed PBEM, or play-by-email, campaigns.

=== 4th edition: Galactic Starfire ===
The 4th edition of Starfire is called Galactic Starfire. This edition combines all the rules (Tactical and Strategic) back into a single rulebook, and replaces the earlier system of Technology Levels with Tech Trees. It is one of the few printed products released by the Starfire Design Studio. Elite (PDF) is a supplement to Galactic Starfire.

=== 5th edition: ULTRA Starfire ===
The 5th edition of Starfire is called ULTRA Starfire. It is a single complete PDF manual of roughly 375 pages. The manual is one of the most integrated rulebooks in the gaming industry with every reference hotlinked to the referenced rule. This rulebook was updated directly and an entirely new set of integrated rules sent to the owners quarterly.

The Ultra edition includes 50 levels of technologies and rules covering Tactical Combat, Ship Design, Squadrons and Carriers, Galaxy Creation (e.g. the map), Empire Building, Surveying, Intelligence Gathering, R&D, Political Treaties and Alliances, Non-Player Races (NPR), and NPR governments (so that each NPR acts differently). Likewise, optional Technologies, Galactic Oddities, Random Events, and finally a set of rules for the creation of races that can live on gas giants, hot planets, cold planets and in the vacuum of space.

=== 6th edition: Solar Starfire ===
The 6th edition of Starfire is called Solar Starfire and was released in 2012 in both PDF and CD formats, and is being actively expanded on, as ULTRA was. There is an active forum for fans of the game. A new campaign setting is being developed for Solar Starfire.

== Gameplay ==
The game involves maneuvering ships into optimum range for their own weapon systems to destroy enemy ships. This is not always easy, as each ship's movement is limited by its speed and ability to turn, and the impulse based movement system that has players moving almost simultaneously. Each ship also has its own unique assortment of systems, including shields, armor and weapons, which are destroyed by enemy fire in a specific order, so part of the strategy involves choosing which enemy ships to target based on which enemy systems a player wishes to destroy. Some weapons have a better chance to hit and inflict different damage at different ranges, and some weapons have the ability to bypass shields and/or armor. When point-based and campaign ship creation is allowed, a new layer of strategy is added, not just in which systems one chooses to put on one's ships but also the order in which they are arrayed and thus destroyed under fire.

Some elements of the game are similar to that of Star Fleet Battles, which was also created by Task Force Games in 1979, including the impulse based movement system and a ship sheet with shields, armor and weapons that are destroyed in a specific order. Starfire is a much faster-player game designed for far bigger fleet combats, not including such elements as ship speeds that carry over from turn to turn and weapon and shield facings which are included in SFB. It also lacks the concept of defining speeds over shorter intervals than one turn, and this eases the elimination of advance plotting of movement.

== Books ==
There have been eight novels published based on the Starfire universe, written by Steve White. Between 1990 and 2002, David Weber and Steve White co-authored a tetralogy of science fiction novels set in the game universe. They are, in publication order, Insurrection (1990), Crusade (1992), In Death Ground (1997), The Shiva Option (2002). The Shiva Option made The New York Times Bestseller List. Crusade and In Death Ground was later published as an omnibus edition The Stars at War (2004). The Shiva Option and Insurrection was later published as an omnibus edition The Stars at War II (2005). A follow-up novel, Exodus, co-written by Steve White and Shirley Meier was released in December 2006. The latest novels, Extremis and Imperative, were co-written by Steven White and Charles E. Gannon and published in May 2011 and March 2016.

Besides these professionally written novels, numerous Web sites contain fan fiction written by Starfire players.

In chronological order of events within the books:

1. Crusade
2. In Death Ground
3. The Shiva Option
4. Insurrection
5. Exodus
6. Extremis
7. Imperative
8. Oblivion

Ordering with the omnibus editions:

1. The Stars At War
2. The Stars at War II
3. Exodus
4. Extremis
5. Imperative
6. Oblivion

=== List of novels ===
- Weber, David; White, Steve; Alexander, Paul (1990). Insurrection. Riverdale, NY: Baen Books. ISBN 0-671-72024-4. OCLC 22671010.
- Weber, David; White, Steve (1992). Crusade. Riverdale, N.Y.: Baen Books. ISBN 0-671-72111-9. OCLC 25294780.
- Weber, David; White, Steve; Mattingly, David B. (May 1997). In death ground. Riverdale, NY. ISBN 0-671-87779-8. OCLC 36781354.
- Weber, David; White, Steve; Mattingly, David B.; Peddicord, Hunter (2002). The Shiva option. Riverdale, N.Y.: Baen Books. ISBN 0-671-31848-9. OCLC 48055472.
- Weber, David; White, Steve; Mattingly, David B. (August 2004). The Stars at War. Vol. I. Riverdale, NY. ISBN 0-7434-8841-5. OCLC 55991748.
- Weber, David; Mattingly, David B.; White, Steve (2005). The Stars at War. Vol. II. Riverdale, NY: Baen Books. ISBN 0-7434-9912-3. OCLC 59401391.
- White, Steve; Meier, Shirley (2007). Exodus. Riverdale, NY: Baen. ISBN 978-1-4165-2098-6. OCLC 71329882.
- White, Steve; Gannon, Charles E. (2011). Extremis : a starfire novel. Riverdale, NY: Baen Books. ISBN 978-1-4391-3433-7. OCLC 646112541.
- White, Steve (March 2016). Imperative : a Starfire novel. Riverdale, NY. ISBN 978-1-4767-8119-8. OCLC 913337274.

== Video game ==
Task Force Games developed a 16K computer version of Starfire.

== Reception ==
In the September 1979 edition of Dragon, Tim Kask found the original Starfire "a lot of fun to play. The mechanics are simple and the movement system keeps both players constantly involved, as does the combat resolution. It moves fast and plays with a high excitement level." Kask noted the ability of the game to be adapted to other strategic "outer space" games, and concluded, "The simplicity of the mechanics make this an outstanding game; its many other possibilities make it a must for anyone that enjoys science fiction boardgames."

Gordon Paterson reviewed Starfire for White Dwarf No. 19, giving it an overall rating of 8 out of 10, and stated that "I am impressed by the thought that has been put into this design. For a small, inexpensive game it has enormous potential and is good value for money."

In the August 1980 issue of The Space Gamer (Issue No. 30), Steve Winter commented on the simplicity of the original Starfire, saying, "If you're looking for detail and realism, you won't find it here. If you enjoy maneuvering massive fleets into high-technology slaughter and don't mind an extremely simplistic treatment of space combat, you'll like Starfire.".

In the October 1980 issue of Fantastic, game designer Greg Costikyan wrote "Though not terribly imaginative, it is not a bad game."

In the March 1981 issue of Dragon, Tony Watson was effusive in his praise of Starfire and Starfire II. "In my opinion, the Stafire system is a real winner. The scenarios provided are interesting and moreover, the game has some very real possibilities. The versatility of the ship systems and the options for ship design can allow the players to use Starfire as a tactical module for many strategic spacegames or as the basis for player-designed campaign games. Priced at $3.95 each, the games are a real bargain; it would be difficult to find a better gaming investment."

In the May 1981 edition of Ares Magazine (Issue #8), Steve List reviewed both Starfire and Starfire II, and thought that both games used "an excellent and playable system with a lot of enjoyment potential." The only fault Goldberg found was the scale of the combat, which was a half a light-second per hex, making the weapons "unbelievably effective." Goldberg commented that the game mechanics "seemed more suited to sea-going than space-faring ships, and the putative scale is ludicrous." He also disagreed with the concept of small fighters firing missiles, calling it "an overwhelming capability." However, Goldberg concluded with a strong recommendation for both games, saying, "a nice, fast, playable and non-taxing recreation at a low price."

In Issue 29 of Phoenix, Paul King liked the game, saying, "[The] Designer's Notes [...] state that the game is designed primarily to be fast and simple, but at the same time allows large fleet games. I am pleased to say that he [designer Stephen Cole] has succeeded, for the game is just that — fast, furious and fun." Four issues later, Brian Collman also reviewed the game for Phoenix, and found the section of rules pertaining to ship design to be "one of the most desirable aspects of the game." He thought the game overall was excellent, noting that "Players have numerous decisions to make, and even more if allowed to design their own ships." He did warn players that the emphasis of this game was to have fun, and "If you are looking for a serious simulation of future space combat (a possibly meaningless quest) this game won't satisfy."

Jason Fryer reviewed Starfire in White Wolf #40 (1994), rating it a 4.5 out of 5 and stated that "To my mind, this is an excellent simulation system. It's well worth the price."

In the June 1985 edition of Isaac Asimov's Science Fiction Magazine, Dana Lombardy recommended this games as suitable for beginners, calling it "a simpler version of Task Force’s popular Star Fleet Battles game about tactical starship combat." However, Lombardy only rated the game as "Fair" for solitaire play.

In Issue 26 of Simulacrum, Brian Train noted, "There are so many space-navy-battle games in print, but in its basic form, Starfire is a good introductory game that does not immediately overload players with detail ... This simple system made engagements of large numbers of ships on each side playable to a conclusion within a few hours."

== Reviews ==
- Analog Science Fiction and Fact

== Legacy ==
Aurora, described as a "4X Sci-Fi Dwarf Fortress in space", was originally based on an assistant program for Starfire.

== See also ==
- Galac-Tac
- Starweb
