= Starfire (Caitlyn Smith album) =

Studio album by Caitlyn Smith
- Released: January 19, 2018
- Genre: Country pop
- Length: 46:25
- Label: Monument
- Producer: Paul Moak

Caitlyn Smith chronology
Starfire (2018)	Supernova (2020)

Singles from Starfire
- 1. "Starfire" Released: March 10, 2017

Starfire is the debut studio album by American country music singer-songwriter Caitlyn Smith. It was released on January 19, 2018, by Monument Records and was produced by Paul Moak.

== Background ==
Prior to the release of the album, an extended play of the same name featuring five tracks was released in 2016.

The title track was released as the lead single. Of the song, Smith explained "after so many years and so many closed doors, 'Starfire' really is my theme song." Having previously worked exclusively as a songwriter for other artists, Smith discussed the difference in the writing process when composing songs for her own album with Billboard, noting "with these songs it was a totally different approach to writing where I was able to dig around my own story and write some more honest stuff."

== Promotion ==
On February 20, 2018, Smith announced a 26-city United States tour to promote Starfire, beginning on April 5 at the Iron Horse Music Hall in Northampton, Massachusetts, and finishing on May 10 in Nashville's Mercy Lounge.

== Critical reception ==
Professional ratings
Review scores
Source	Rating
AllMusic	3.5/5 stars

AllMusic's Stephen Thomas Erlewine called it "the rare kind of singer/songwriter album where the exquisitely sculpted songs are given big, lavish arrangements that swing for the fences", but highlighted "This Town Is Killing Me" and "Tacoma" for showing Smith being "equally at home in more intimate settings", concluding that: "These are fully realized versions of Smith's repertoire, and if Starfire doesn't click commercially, at least it stands as a testament to all that this fine songwriter can do as a performer."

== Track listing ==
Starfire track listing
No.	Title	Writer(s)	Length
1.	"Before You Called Me Baby"	Matt Jenkins; Caitlyn Smith	3:44
2.	"Do You Think About Me"	Rollie Gaalswyk; Jeremy Lardani; Smith	3:32
3.	"Starfire"	Blair Daly; Steven Lee Olsen; Smith	4:32
4.	"East Side Restaurant"	Paul Moak; Gordie Sampson; Smith	4:00
5.	"Don't Give Up on My Love"	Smith	4:07
6.	"This Town Is Killing Me"	Moak; Sampson; Smith	3:46
7.	"St. Paul"	Luke Dick; Smith; Troy Verges	3:56
8.	"Tacoma"	Bob DiPiero; Smith	3:59
9.	"Scenes From a Corner Booth at Closing Time on a Tuesday"	DiPiero; Smith	3:22
10.	"Contact High"	Sarah Buxton; Smith; Kate York	4:12
11.	"House of Cards"	Aimee Mayo; Smith	4:05
12.	"Cheap Date"	Jonathan Green; Sampson; Smith	3:10

== Charts ==
Chart (2018)	Peak position
US Top Album Sales (Billboard)	82
US Americana/Folk Albums (Billboard)	24
US Heatseekers Albums (Billboard)	6

== Personnel ==
Credits adapted from AllMusic.

- Matthew Berinato - Package Design
- Brad Blackwood - Mastering
- Michael Brauer - Mixing
- Tyler Burkum - Guitar (Acoustic), Guitar (Electric), Vocals (Background)
- Sarah Buxton - Vocals (Background)
- Bobby Chase - Viola
- Eleonore Denig - Violin
- Jason Eskridge - Vocals (Background)
- Ian Fitchuk - Congas, Drums, Organ, Percussion, Piano (Upright), Vocals (Background), Wurlitzer
- Becky Fluke - Photography
- Cara Fox - Cello
- Sarah Johnson - Production Assistant
- Benjamin Kaufman - Violin
- Katie McCartney - Art Direction
- Paul Moak - Engineer, Guitar (Acoustic), Guitar (Electric), Hi String Guitar (Acoustic), Mixing, Organ, Pedal Steel Guitar, Piano (Upright), Pipe Organ, Producer, Vocals (Background)
- Gordie Sampson - Piano
- Caitlyn Smith - Guitar (Electric), Guitar (Tenor), Primary Artist, Vocals (Background)
- Brendan St. Gelais - Assistant
- Devin Vaughan - Engineer, Mixing
- Kevin Whitsett - Bass, Bass (Upright), Vocals (Background)
- Zack Zinck - Assistant
