= The Shiva Option =

2002 novel by David Weber and Steve White

- First edition
- Author: David Weber, Steve White
- Cover artist: David Mattingly
- Language: English
- Series: Starfire series
- Genre: Science fiction
- Publisher: Baen Books
- Publication date: February 5, 2002 (hardcover); August 2003 (paperback)
- Publication place: United States
- Media type: Print & e-book
- Pages: 753
- ISBN: 0-671-31848-9 (hc); ISBN 978-0-7434-7144-2 (pb); ISBN 0-7434-7144-X (pb)
- OCLC: 48055472
- Dewey Decimal: 813/.54 21
- LC Class: PS3573.E217 S55 2002
- Preceded by: In Death Ground
- Followed by: Insurrection

The Shiva Option, published by Baen Books, is the sequel to David Weber and Steve White's military science fiction novel In Death Ground.

== Plot summary ==
The Grand Alliance of Terrans, Orions, Gorm and Ophiuchi has suffered a catastrophic defeat at the hands of the Bugs during the Pesthouse Campaign. Many senior military commanders have been lost, along with the bulk of the Terran Federation pre-war fleet. The Bugs appear unstoppable and fight their way toward Federation space, reaching the key system of Alpha Centauri before they are narrowly repulsed. Now, with the war once more at a stalemate, the Grand Alliance must try to recover their losses and break the deadlock.

Unable to communicate or negotiate with the Bugs, the Alliance realises that the war has become a fight for the survival of their respective species and invoke Directive 18, last used against the Rigelians, and embark upon a war of species extermination. Hope arrives when the Alliance infers that, due to differences in construction methods, they can be faced by no more than five Bug Home systems. They also postulate that the massive Bug fleets are, in fact, the result of years of military build-up. The reason for this seemingly unnecessary military reserve remains unknown.

After finding a hidden route into one of the Bug home systems, the new military commanders of the Grand Alliance invoke Directive 18 and carry out a series of devastating attacks on the planet, launching massive waves of antimatter missiles against the surface in order to sterilize it. The simultaneous death of billions of their fellows leaves the surviving Bug fleet temporarily incapacitated, seeming to confirm the Alliance analysts speculation that the Bugs are telepathic. This “psychic shock” effect becomes known as the “Shiva Option” (named after the Hindu God of Destruction). Soon it becomes Alliance doctrine to exercise the Shiva Option wherever possible, in order to incapacitate Bug mobile forces and reduce resistance. Gradually, the Grand Alliance takes the initiative, forcing the Bugs onto the defensive.

Meanwhile, Terran Federation Survey Flotilla 19, last seen headed into unknown space and cut off from Alliance territory by the Bug counter-offensive, runs a desperate gauntlet to try to find a way back to friendly territory, whilst fending off almost continuous Bug attacks. Eventually, they stumble across the Star Union of Crucis, a multi-species polity that fought the bugs more than a century ago and have been in hiding ever since, rebuilding their forces. It transpires that the Bug military build-up was prompted by their first war with the Crucians. The commander of the survey team establishes communications with the Crucians and they unite against the pursuing Bug forces, destroying them. Seeing an opportunity to destroy their ancient enemies for good, the Crucians willingly offer themselves as new members of the Grand Alliance against the Bugs. In return, the commander of the flotilla releases the latest military technology to the Crucians and their allies, the Telikans and the Zarkolyans. Fighting their way back to Alliance space, the Crucians finally establish contact and formalize their membership of the Grand Alliance.

Now trapped between their old and new enemies, the Bugs fight an increasingly desperate defensive war. When the three remaining Bug home systems are cut off from each other, the Grand Alliance are able to quickly overwhelm the remaining Bug forces and successfully carry out Directive 18.

With one exception – a small Bug colony, isolated from its home world by a hidden warp point, remains undiscovered by the Alliance...
