= Courtney Marie Andrews =

American singer-songwriter (born 1990)

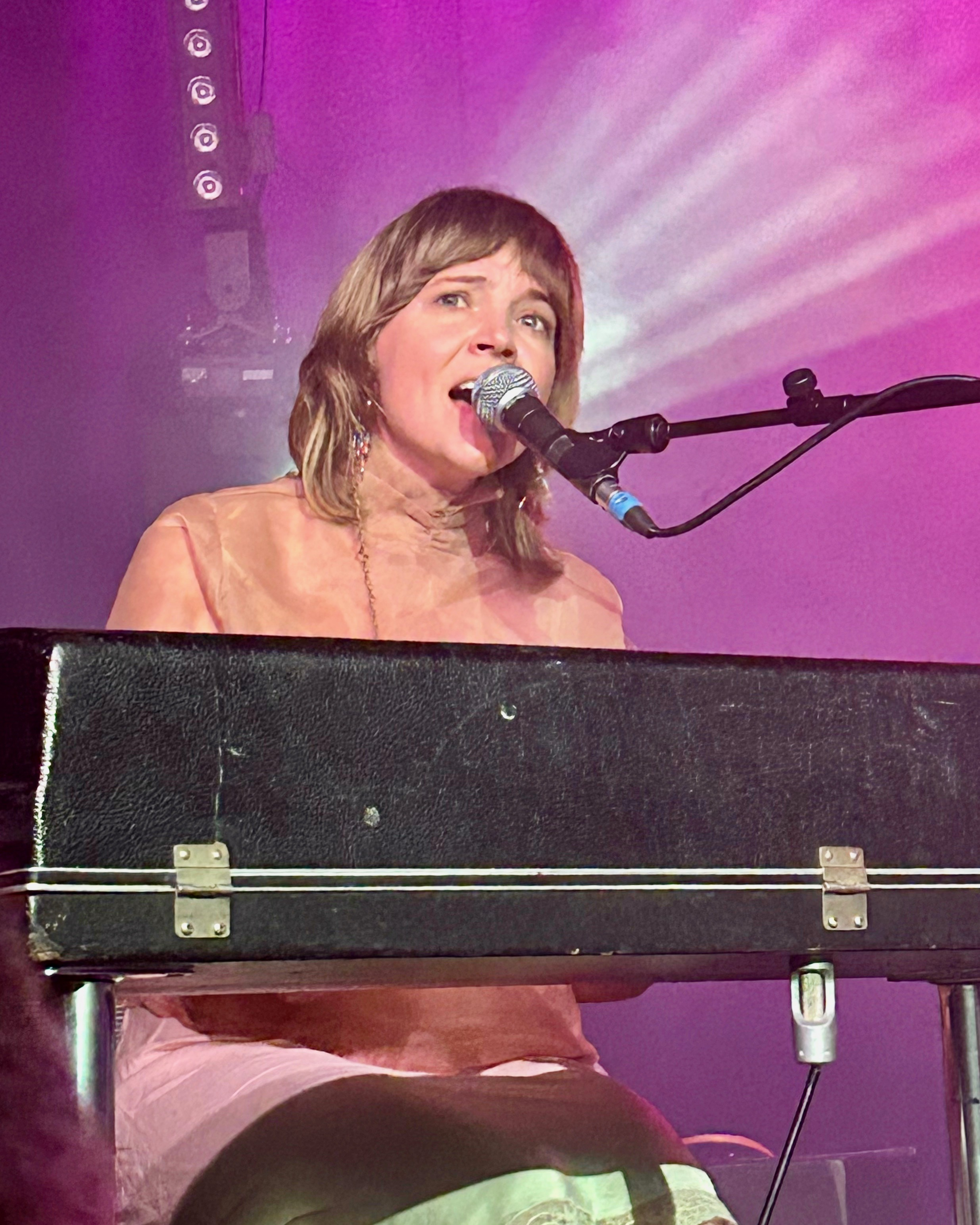
- Andrews performing at Band on the Wall in Manchester, England, 2023

Background information
- Born: Courtney Marie Andrews; November 7, 1990 (age 35)
- Origin: Phoenix, Arizona, U.S.
- Genres: Indie pop; folk; country; Americana
- Occupation: Singer-songwriter
- Instruments: Vocals; guitar; keyboards
- Years active: 2007–present
- Labels: River Jones Music; Mama Bird Recording Co.; Loose; Fat Possum
- Website: courtneymarieandrews.com

Courtney Marie Andrews (born November 7, 1990) is an American singer-songwriter originally from Phoenix, Arizona. She released her first widely distributed and breakthrough studio album, Honest Life, in 2016. From 2010 to 2011, Andrews was an auxiliary member of Jimmy Eat World, appearing on their seventh studio album Invented (2010) and acting as their keyboardist and backing vocalist on the subsequent tour.

== History ==
=== Early years ===
Andrews began playing guitar and writing songs at the age of 13 or 14 and began performing at 15.

In September 2009, Jim Adkins of the band Jimmy Eat World asked Andrews to sing with him on a live cover of Wilco and Feist's song "You and I". In 2010, she recorded backing vocals for Jimmy Eat World on five songs for their studio album Invented. She subsequently joined them on stage to perform during the album's release and full 2010–2011 tours, acting as their keyboardist and backing vocalist.

In 2011, Andrews relocated to Seattle, Washington. It was there that she began playing electric guitar in long-time admirer Damien Jurado's band.

=== Honest Life ===
It was while living in Belgium for four months playing guitar and singing with Belgian star Milow that the songs for Honest Life, Andrews' fifth studio album, started taking shape. Written on the back of heartbreak and homesickness, Honest Life tells the story of Andrews' first true growing pains as a woman, the desire to fit somewhere when nowhere fits and the longing to return home to the people she knows and loves. The album was produced entirely by Andrews at Litho Studios in Seattle with audio engineer Floyd Reitsma and was released on August 19, 2016, in North America by Mama Bird Recording Co. and on January 20, 2017, in the UK and Europe by Loose.

It was well received by US critics. In addition to being The Bluegrass Situation's Album of the Year, Rolling Stone named Honest Life one of the Top 40 country albums of 2016 as well as naming Andrews one of ten new country artists people need to know. Stereogum praised Andrews' songwriting, calling it "an expert marriage of gracefully confessional songwriting with country-folk arrangements that recall Joni Mitchell" while naming Honest Life the No. 6 best country album of 2016. While naming it the No. 38 best album of 2016, American Songwriter called the single "How Quickly Your Heart Mends" the No. 4 song of 2016 and continued to praise Andrews' songwriting saying "she writes with such empathy and insight that she gives Lucinda a run for her money". The single "Rookie Dreaming" was placed on the year end Heavy Rotation list by NPR and was placed on their "Folk Alley's 10 Favorite Albums of 2016" list.

Upon its release in the UK/EU, Honest Life reached No. 1 on the Official UK Americana Chart and No. 1 on the Independent Album Breakers Chart after the first week. It received a five-star review from The Daily Telegraph who called it "an absolutely perfect little gem of an album" and four-star reviews from both Mojo and Q magazines.

On April 11, Courtney performed "Table for One" and "Honest Life" on Later... with Jools Holland. She was joined by pedal steel guitarist B. J. Cole on both songs and Jools Holland joined the pair on "Honest Life".

=== May Your Kindness Remain ===
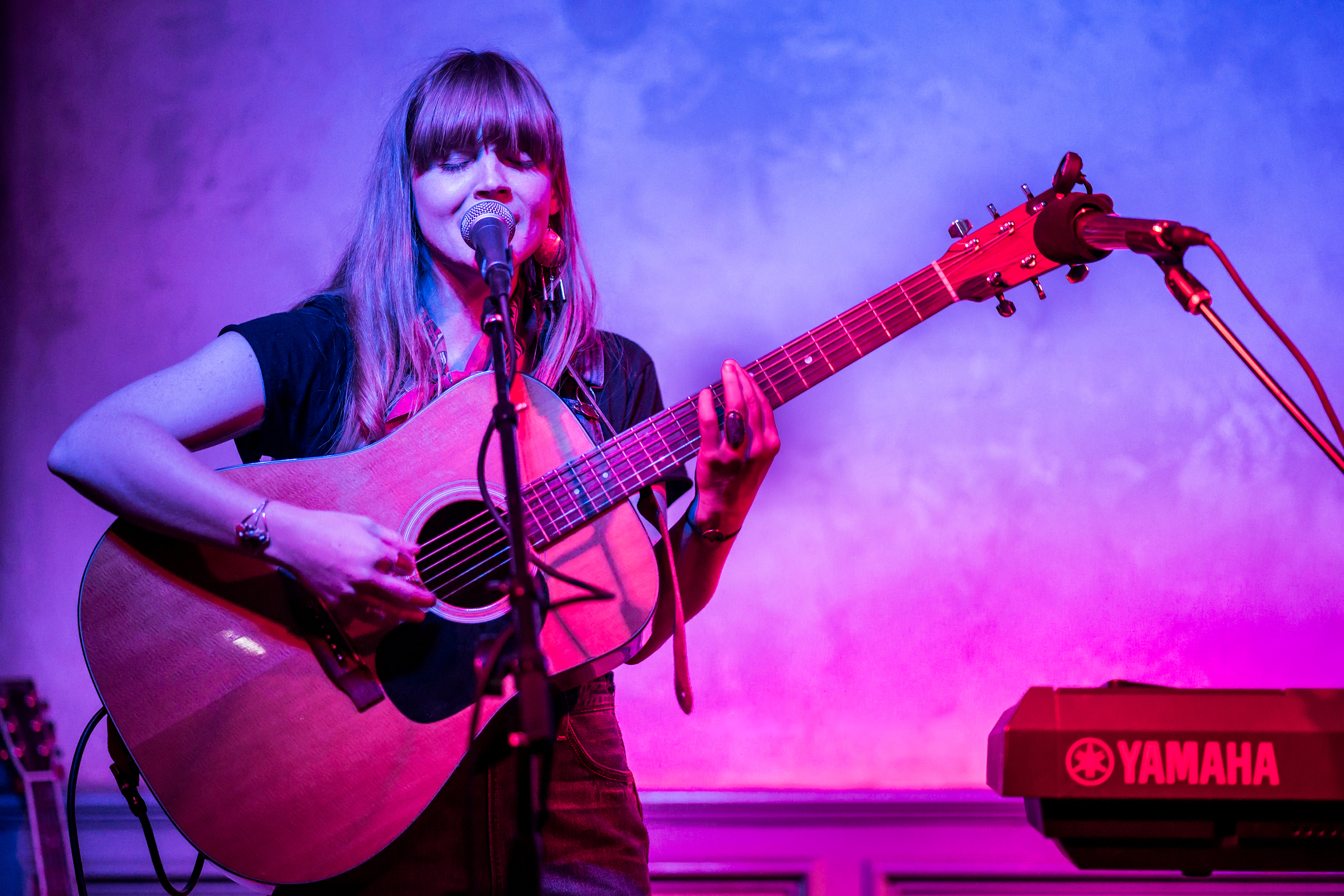
Andrews performing in 2017

May Your Kindness Remain is Andrews' sixth studio album and the follow-up to her breakthrough studio album, Honest Life. The album was released on March 23, 2018, in the UK and Europe by Loose and the rest of the world by Fat Possum Records and Mama Bird Recording Co. Produced by Mark Howard (Lucinda Williams, Bob Dylan, Emmylou Harris, Tom Waits), the album was recorded over eight days at a rented house-turned-studio in Los Angeles, California. In addition to Andrews on vocals and electric and acoustic guitar, the album features Dillon Warnek (electric guitar), Daniel Walter (organ, Wurlitzer, accordion), Charles Wicklander (piano, Wurlitzer), William Mapp (drums, percussion), Alex Sabel (bass) and C.C. White (backing vocals).

Of the album and the inspiration behind its ten songs, Andrews comments, "The people that I've met on the road these past few years got me thinking about my childhood, and the people around me that I've known, and the stories that come from my family. It became clear how many people are struggling through the same issues. People are constantly chasing that bigger life. A lot of people are poor in America—and because of those unattainable goals, they're also mentally unstable, or sad, or depressed or unfulfilled. A lot of people—myself included at some point in my life—are loving somebody through this. That's sort of the theme of the record: coming to terms with depression and the reality of the world we're living in."

May Your Kindness Remain received critical acclaim for its release in the United States from Rolling Stone, NPR Music, Chicago Tribune, American Songwriter, WXPN The Key, Bluegrass Situation and more. Of the single and Andrews, Fader declares "Kindness of Strangers' rules...incredible cut...what a voice she has – it always lifts me up" and Paste magazine recounts that the album is "a rare blend of power and feeling that can bring you to your knees". Naming May Your Kindness Remain as the album of the week, Stereogum describes the album as "...a head-spinning discovery, a warm and gorgeous and fully formed piece of work. The kindness isn't just in the lyrics. It's in the way music like this can nourish you, can make your insides glow. An album like this can be a refuge," while BrooklynVegan describes the album as "more proof that Courtney is a force to be reckoned with".

Upon its release in Europe, May Your Kindness Remain received No. 1 placement on the Euro Americana Chart for April 2018, as well as placing No. 1 on the UK Americana Albums Charts, UK Independent Albums Breakers Charts, No. 5 on the UK Independent Albums Chart. The Daily Telegraph called the album "another absolute beauty, a set of nuanced, compassionate portraits and vignettes of good people in difficult circumstances". Additionally, MYKR placed in at No. 19 in Sweden for general music charts upon its release. The album received positive reception in the United States as well, placing No. 12 on the US Top New Artist Albums Chart and No. 14 on the US Americana/Folk Albums chart. Andrews subsequently received the "International Artist of the Year" award by the UK Americana Awards for May Your Kindness Remain in February 2018.

On March 31, 2018, following the release of May Your Kindness Remain, Andrews made her US national television debut on CBS This Morning Saturday where she performed "May Your Kindness Remain", "Kindness of Strangers", and "Two Cold Nights in Buffalo". Shortly after, the band appeared on NPR's World Cafe series performing the album's title track. In May 2018, Andrews was nominated for "Emerging Artist of the Year" by the Americana Music Association in the United States. She later performed on air at the Americana Music and Honors awards ceremony on September 13, 2018, at the legendary Ryman Auditorium in Nashville, Tennessee.

In June 2018, Rolling Stone named May Your Kindness Remain as one of the 25 Best Country and Americana Albums of 2018. In the United Kingdom, The Guardian similarly called the album one of the 25 Best Albums of 2018.

=== Old Flowers ===
Andrews released her seventh studio album Old Flowers on July 24, 2020, via Fat Possum Records/Loose. The album initially had a June release date, but Andrews moved its release back due to the COVID-19 pandemic's impact on vinyl record production and independent record stores. The album was met with immediate critical acclaim from The New York Times and it received 5 stars from The Times. Rolling Stone described the single "It Must Be Someone Else's Fault" as bringing "to mind classic Bob Dylan and Joni Mitchell, but Andrews' bell-clear voice and fearless message of introspection are unmistakably her own".

The album received a nomination for Best Americana Album at the 63rd Annual Grammy Awards.

In July 2021 she participated as a solo artist at the Newport Folk Festival.

=== Old Monarch ===
Andrews' debut poetry collection, Old Monarch, was published by Andrews McMeel Publishing in 2021. Cleveland Review of Books said the collection "taps into the folklores of the American frontier".

=== Loose Future ===
Andrews' eighth studio album was released in October 2022 under Fat Possum Records. Written from a beach shack on Cape Cod, a summer of introspection led to the inception of Loose Future.

In partnership with Sam Evian, a producer who has previously worked with Big Thief and Cassandra Jenkins, Andrews was able to expand her aural palate and transition into a new sonic world. Pitchfork asserted that "the smooth, radiant production doesn't amount to commercial pandering: it's assured, exploratory, and warm music that mirrors Andrews' newly opened heart."

On Loose Future, "Andrews channels her pop influences to make her brightest, freest songs to date." The ten-track album "is about freedom, renewal, self-love and saving commitment for tomorrow". These themes stem from the timing of the writing, as the songs were penned during the global COVID-19 pandemic and on the heels of the end of a longtime relationship. According to a review from BrooklynVegan, the record "feels like everything she's always been working towards... some of her strongest songwriting and most gorgeous sounding music yet."

== Discography ==
Albums

Year	Title	Label	Number
2008	Urban Myths	River Jones Music	?
2009	Painter's Hands and a Seventh Son	River Jones Music	?
2010	For One I Knew	River Jones Music	?
2011	No One's Slate Is Clean	House Arrest	1645
2013	On My Page	House Arrest/Fat Possum/Loose	1646, VJ236
2016	Honest Life	Mama Bird/Fat Possum/Loose	MB013, VJ228
2018	May Your Kindness Remain	Fat Possum/Mama Bird/Loose	FP1651-1, 1651–2, VJ240
2020	Old Flowers	Fat Possum	
2022	Loose Future	Fat Possum	
2026	Valentine	Loose Future	

Singles

Year	Title	Label	Number
2016	"How Quickly Your Heart Mends"	Mama Bird/Loose	VJS59
2017	"Sea Town"/"Near You"	Loose/Mama Bird/Fat Possum	VJS80, MB017-7, FP1641-7

Music videos

Year	Title
2017	"Put the Fire Out"
2017	"Took You Up"
2017	"Irene"
2018	"Kindness of Strangers"
2018	"Heart and Mind"
2020	"Burlap String"
2020	"It Must Be Someone Else's Fault"

== Awards and nominations ==
Year	Association	Category	Nominated work	Result
2018	UK Americana Awards	International Artist of the Year	Courtney Marie Andrews	Won
2018	Americana Music Honors & Awards	Emerging Artist of the Year	Courtney Marie Andrews	Nominated
2020	Grammy Awards	Best Americana Album	Old Flowers	Nominated
