= Caitlyn Smith =

American singer-songwriter and musician (born 1986)

- Born: Caitlyn Elizabeth Smith; June 13, 1986 (age 40); Cannon Falls, Minnesota, U.S.
- Origin: Nashville, Tennessee, U.S.
- Genre: Country pop
- Occupations: Singer; songwriter
- Label: Monument
- Website: caitlynsmith.com

Caitlyn Elizabeth Smith (born June 13, 1986) is an American singer-songwriter and musician. She was raised in Cannon Falls, Minnesota. Smith's debut album Starfire was released on Monument Records on January 19, 2018. Her second studio album, Supernova, was released on March 13, 2020. Her third album High & Low was released on April 14, 2023.

== Musical career ==
She has written songs recorded by Meghan Trainor ("Like I'm Gonna Lose You", duet with John Legend, #1 on Billboard Adult Top 40 chart), Kenny Rogers and Dolly Parton ("You Can't Make Old Friends"), Avicii ("Chained") and ("Love"), Miley Cyrus ("High") and more.

She released the EP Starfire in July 2016. In January 2017, she announced she had signed a label deal with the newly reformed Monument Records. Smith has played at Lollapalooza, Bourbon & Beyond Festival, Americana Fest and ACL Fest.

Caitlyn was named one of Rolling Stone Magazine's "10 New Artists You Need To Know". She recorded "The Card You Gamble", the theme song of the drama series Monarch, which premiered in 2022.

== Personal life ==
Caitlyn lives in Nashville with her husband, songwriter Rollie Gaalswyk. They have three sons together, Thomas Miles Gaalswyk (b. 2016), Lewis James Gaalswyk (b. 2018), and Jacob Roland Gaalswyk (b. 2023).

== Discography ==
=== Studio albums ===
Title	Album details	Peak chart positions		
Title	Album details	US Sales	US Folk	US Heat
Starfire	Release date: January 19, 2018; Label: Monument	—	24	6
Supernova	Release date: March 13, 2020; Label: Monument	92	—	—
High & Low	Release date: April 14, 2023; Label: Monument	—	—	—
Peace In My Mind	Release date: October 6, 2026; Label: Skylark Records	—	—	—
"—" denotes releases that did not chart

=== Extended plays ===
Title	EP details	Peak chart positions		
Title	EP details	US Folk	US Heat	US Indie
Everything to You	Release date: October 28, 2014; Label: Skylark	—	—	—
Starfire	Release date: July 8, 2016; Label: Skylark / Monument	18	16	48
High	Release date: April 8, 2022; Label: Monument	—	—	—
"—" denotes releases that did not chart

=== Singles ===
==== As lead artist ====
Title	Year	Peak chart positions		Album
Title	Year	US AAA	US Country Airplay	Album
"Starfire"	2018	—	—	Starfire
"Put Me Back Together"	2019	—	—	Supernova
"Long Time Coming"	2020	35	—	Supernova
"I Can't" (featuring Old Dominion)	2021	—	37	Supernova
"Downtown Baby"	2022	—	59	High & Low
"Lately"	2023	—	—	High & Low
"—" denotes a single that did not chart or was not released to that format.

==== As featured artist ====
Year	Title	Artist	Album
2025	"Stoned Alone"	Meghan Patrick	Golden Child

== Selected writing credits ==
Adapted from AllMusic.

Title	Year	Artist	Album	Notes
"It Ain't Easy"	2010	Jason Aldean	My Kinda Party	Written with Jon Mabe and Justin Weaver
"Let's Fight"	2011	Julie Roberts	Alive	Written with Jason Collum and Julie Roberts
"Let It Hurt"	2012	Rascal Flatts	Changed	Written with Jay DeMarcus and Gordie Sampson
"You Can't Make Old Friends"	2013	Kenny Rogers and Dolly Parton	You Can't Make Old Friends and Blue Smoke	Written with Ryan Hanna King and Don Schlitz; #57 US Country Airplay (Billboard)
"Wasting All These Tears"	2013	Cassadee Pope	Frame by Frame	Written with Rollie Gaalswyk; #37 US Billboard Hot 100; #5 US Hot Country Songs (Billboard); #10 US Country Airplay (Billboard)
"Hypnotizing"	2013	Hayden Panettiere	The Music of Nashville: Season 1, Volume 2	Written with Cary Barlowe and Steve Robson; Featured in the television series Nashville (2012 TV series), performed by Hayden Panettiere's character Juliette Barnes
"Wild Boy"	2013	Danielle Bradbery	Danielle Bradbery	Written with Chris Lindsey, Aimee Mayo, and Troy Verges
"Dear Heart"	2013	Tenille Townes	Light	Written with Kelly Archer and Gordie Sampson
"Don't Put Dirt On My Grave Just Yet"	2014	Hayden Panettiere	The Music of Nashville: Season 2, Volume 2	Written with Trent Dabbs
"I Ain't Sinkin' Yet"	2014	Jann Arden	Everything Almost	Written with Connie Harrington
"Tacoma"	2014	Garth Brooks	Man Against Machine	Written with Bob DiPiero
"Loved"	2014	Lucy Hale	Road Between	Written with Lucy Hale and Brett James
"747"	2014	Lady Antebellum	747	Written with Gordie Sampson and Cary Barlowe
"The Heart of Dixie"	2014	Danielle Bradbery	Danielle Bradbery	Written with Brett James and Troy Verges; #58 US Billboard Hot 100; #12 US Country Airplay (Billboard); #16 US Hot Country Songs (Billboard)
"Hear Your Heart"	2015	James Bay	Other Sides (EP)	Written with James Bay and Steve Robson
"What I Do"	2015	Kip Moore	Wild Ones	Written with Kip Moore and Steve Robson
"I Am What I Am"	2015	Laura Bell Bundy	Another Piece of Me	Written with Gordie Sampson and Troy Verges
"Down in Flames"	2015	Chris Isaak	First Comes the Night	Written with Chris Isaak and Gordie Sampson
"Like I'm Gonna Lose You"	2015	Meghan Trainor featuring John Legend	Title	Written with Meghan Trainor and Justin Weaver; Certified 4× Platinum US RIAA; #8 US Billboard Hot 100; #2 US Adult Contemporary (Billboard); #1 US Adult Top 40 (Billboard); #5 US Mainstream Top 40 (Billboard)
"The Bird and the Rifle"	2016	Lori McKenna	The Bird and the Rifle	Written with Lori McKenna and Troy Verges
"Space"	2017	Lindsay Ell	Worth the Wait and The Project	Written with Maggie Chapman and Heather Morgan
"Everything Without You"	2017	Temecula Road	Non-album single	Written with Nick Brophy and Tom Douglas
"I Don't Trust Myself"	2017	Sara Evans	Words	Written with Steve McEwan and Gordie Sampson
"Unsaid"	2017	Sunny Sweeney	Trophy	Written with Sunny Sweeney
"Same Day Different Bottle"	2017	Lauren Alaina	Road Less Traveled	Written with Lauren Alaina and Dan Couch
"Kill Your Love"	2017	Jess Moskaluke	Past the Past	Written with Ashley Monroe and Liz Rose
"Put Me Back Together"	2018	Cheat Codes featuring Kiiara	Non-album single	Written with Trevor Dahl, Brenton Duvall, Jonny Price and Kiara Saulters
"Dying Star"	2018	Ruston Kelly	Dying Star	Written with Rollie Gaalswyk and Ruston Kelly
"Glasgow (No Place Like Home)"	2019	Jessie Buckley	Wild Rose	Written with Mary Steenburgen and Kate York
"Canary"	2019	Joy Williams	Front Porch	Written with Angelo Petraglia and Joy Williams
"No Place Like You"	2019	Joy Williams	Front Porch	Written with Paul Moak and Joy Williams
"Every Girl in This Town"	2019	Trisha Yearwood	Every Girl	Written with Erik Dylan and Connie Harrington
"I'll Carry You Home"	2019	Trisha Yearwood	Every Girl	Written with Gordie Sampson and Troy Verges
"Can't Take Back Goodbye"	2019	Trisha Yearwood	Every Girl	Written with Busbee and Troy Verges
"High"	2020	Miley Cyrus	Plastic Hearts	Written with Miley Cyrus and Jennifer Decilveo
"Feel"	2020	Fletcher	The S(ex) Tapes	Written with Jennifer Decilveo and Cari Fletcher
"Goldmine"	2020	Gabby Barrett	Goldmine	Written with Nicolle Galyon and Liz Rose
"North Star"	2021	Tori Kelly	Zoey's Extraordinary Christmas	Written with Mary Steenburgen and Troy Verges; Featured in the TV Movie Zoey's Extraordinary Christmas
"Want You To Miss Me"	2022	Sunny Sweeney	Married Alone	Written with Sunny Sweeney
"Neon Stars"	2022	Wild Rivers	Sidelines	Written with Khalid Yassein
"Island"	2023	Miley Cyrus	Endless Summer Vacation	Written with Miley Cyrus, Jennifer Decilveo, BJ Burton, Michael Pollack, Dani Miller
“Surrender”	2025	Mumford and Sons	Rushmere	

== Awards and nominations ==
Year	Award show	Category	Nominated work	Result	Ref
2020	Critics' Choice Awards	Best Original Song	"Glasgow (No Place Like Home)"	Won	
2022	CMT Music Awards	Breakthrough Video of the Year	"I Can't" (with Old Dominion)	Nominated	
2022	Academy of Country Music Awards	New Female Artist of the Year	Caitlyn Smith	Nominated	
2023	Academy of Country Music Awards	New Female Artist of the Year	Caitlyn Smith	Nominated	
2025	Canadian Country Music Association Awards	Musical Collaboration of the Year	"Stoned Alone" (with Meghan Patrick)	Nominated	
