= Starfire: First Contact =

Starfire: First Contact is a 1993 supplement for Starfire published by Task Force Games.

== Contents ==
Starfire: First Contact is a supplement in which the two races of the Corsairs of Tangri and the Vestrii are introduced.

== Publication history ==
Starfire: First Contact was the first expansion set published for Starfire. Shannon Appelcline explained that part of the success of Starfire was the novels for the system written by Stephen White and David Weber, and that "During the last years of Task Force Games, they released two controversial Starfire supplements - First Contact (1993) and Alkeda Dawn (1994) - that went beyond the history of the novels. They are now widely known as the 'non-Weber' Starfire supplements. Other than those two publications, the novels by Weber and White have been the official background of the Starfire universe since their publication."

== Reception ==
Jason Fryer reviewed First Contact in White Wolf #43 (May, 1994), rating it a 2.5 out of 5 and stated that "I'm disappointed with this product. There just isn't enough in it to make it very interesting. I think the authors should have waited and released this after Imperial Starfire so they could include star system data forms for this product's races. Task Force Games must also examine the print quality of their supplements; smudging of art and text is a real problem. The price of First Contact is just too much for too little."

== Reviews ==
- Dragon #203
