= Old Flowers =

Studio album by Courtney Marie Andrews
- Released: July 24, 2020
- Studio: Sound Space (Los Angeles)
- Genre: Americana; folk; indie pop
- Length: 41:08
- Label: Fat Possum
- Producer: Andrew Sarlo

Courtney Marie Andrews chronology
May Your Kindness Remain (2018)	Old Flowers (2020)	Loose Future (2022)

Old Flowers is the seventh studio album by American singer-songwriter Courtney Marie Andrews. It was released on July 24, 2020, via Fat Possum Records.

For the album, Andrews received a nomination for Best Americana Album at the 63rd Annual Grammy Awards, but lost to Sarah Jarosz's World on the Ground.

== Critical reception ==
Professional ratings
Aggregate scores
Source	Rating
AnyDecentMusic?	7.3/10
Metacritic	81/100
Review scores
Source	Rating
AllMusic	4/5 stars
American Songwriter	4/5 stars
Consequence of Sound	B
Exclaim!	9/10
musicOMH	3/5 stars
NME	4/5 stars
PopMatters	6/10 stars
The Arts Desk	3/5 stars
The Line of Best Fit	7/10
Under the Radar	8/10 stars

Old Flowers was met with generally favorable reviews from critics. At Metacritic, which assigns a weighted average rating out of 100 to reviews from mainstream publications, this release received an average score of 81, based on 15 reviews. The aggregator AnyDecentMusic? has the critical consensus of the album at a 7.3 out of 10, based on 17 reviews. The aggregator Album of the Year assessed the critical consensus as 76 out of 100, based on 20 reviews.

Dylan Barnabe of Exclaim! praised the album saying, "It is emotional, redemptive and leaves an indelible mark on the listener. Andrews provides a raw, honest and unflinching look in the mirror of a failed relationship and finds herself; it's a story as old as time, but somehow told more achingly beautiful here". Mark Moody of Under The Radar stated, "Andrews' vocals may not have the hard-bitten vernacular of Iris Dement, but in their purity of tone share the same deep level of pathos". AllMusic's Stephen Thomas Erlewine wrote "In some respects, Old Flowers could be called a shade too successful, since it casts a specific understated spell, but listened to in the right mood or hour of the day, it's a bewitching affair". Writing for NME, Leonie Cooper said "Musing on the break-up of a nine-year-long romantic relationship, simplicity is key to "Old Flowers" innate grace". Hal Horowitz of American Songwriter stated, "Old Flowers conclusively proves that Courtney Marie Andrews has reached a difficult to attain level, showing once again that the timeworn trope of "breaking up is hard to do" can be dreadfully unsettling personally but also creatively rewarding". Annie Black of Consequence of Sound said, "She is mourning and healing all at once here, and while at times it can feel a bit tedious, overall she's delivered one solid collection of songs". Dillon Eastoe of The Line of Best Fit said, "Continuing to imbibe her music with a remarkable pathos that has these new songs greeting the listener like familiar friends by the second spin, Courtney Marie Andrews keeps growing and Old Flowers is the fruit of this blossom".

In a mixed review, Steven Johnson of musicOMH wrote, "Heartache has inspired countless songs and albums over the years and if nothing else Old Flowers shows how humans will continue to turn to music for comfort in times of sadness for many years to come. These songs have clearly provided solace to Andrews and it's likely they'll do the same for others in similar need". The Arts Desk's Liz Thomson stated, "The textures are imaginative, occasional dissonances and sounds you can't immediately identify making the album all the more compelling". PopMatters critic Kevin Kearney said, "When Andrews focuses on her own story, she's an immensely compelling songwriter. It's when she speaks in a general sense about heartache that her powers are weakened".

=== Accolades ===
Accolades for Old Flowers
Publication	Accolade	Rank	Ref.
Albumism	Albumism Selects: The 100 Best Albums of 2020	73	
Good Morning America	50 Best Albums of 2020	37	
Magnet	Magnet's Top 25 Albums of 2020	18	
Uncut	75 Best Albums of 2020	14	
WXPN	WXPN Best of 2020: Albums	—N/a	

== Track listing ==
All tracks are written by Courtney Marie Andrews.

No.	Title	Length
1.	"Burlap String"	3:57
2.	"Guilty"	3:54
3.	"If I Told"	4:58
4.	"Together Or Alone"	4:01
5.	"Carnival Dream"	4:20
6.	"Old Flowers"	3:48
7.	"Break the Spell"	4:22
8.	"It Must Be Someone Else's Fault"	3:18
9.	"How You Get Hurt"	4:24
10.	"Ships in the Night"	4:02
Total length:		41:08

== Personnel ==
Musicians

- Courtney Marie Andrews – lead vocals (all tracks), acoustic guitar (tracks 1, 3, 7–9), piano (4–6), Mellotron (4), "meanderings" (7), Wurlitzer (10)
- Matthew Davidson – bass guitar (1–3, 5–8), vocals (1, 6, 7), piano (1–3, 9), pedal steel guitar (1, 8), Wurlitzer (2, 5), pump organ (3, 7), mellophone (4), arco bass (5), piano bass (5), saw (5), celeste (7, 8), "meanderings" (7), acoustic guitar (8)
- James Krivchenia – drums (1, 2, 5–9), percussion (1, 7–9), acoustic guitar (2), "meanderings" (7), Casio (9)
- Andrew Sarlo – bass guitar (4, 10)

Technical

- Andrew Sarlo – production, mixing, engineering
- Bob Ludwig – mastering
- Branden Stroup – engineering, mixing assistance

Artwork

- Sarah Scheisser – design, layout
- Sam Stenson – photography

== Charts ==
Chart (2020)	Peak position
Scottish Albums (OCC)	12
UK Albums (OCC)	62
UK Americana Albums (OCC)	3
UK Country Albums (OCC)	2
UK Independent Albums (OCC)	3
UK Vinyl Albums (OCC)	13
