= Firestar =

Firestar may refer to:

- Firestar (Marvel Comics), a comic book superhero originating in the 1980s animated series Spider-Man and His Amazing Friends
- Firestar (novel), a novel by Michael Flynn
- Fire Star (novel), a novel by Chris D'Lacey
- Firestar (limited series), a comic book limited series
- Firestar (Warriors character), the main protagonist from the book series Warriors
- Firestar (Dungeons & Dragons), a monster from the 2nd edition of the Dungeons & Dragons role-playing game
- Star Firestar M43, a firearm manufactured by Star Bonifacio Echeverria, S.A. in Eibar, Spain
- Kolb Firestar, an ultralight aircraft
- Mars or fire star
- Firestar's Quest, a Super Edition for the Warrior Cats series (set between The Darkest Hour and Midnight)

== See also ==
- Starfire (disambiguation)
