= In Death Ground =

1997 novel by David Weber and Steve White

- First edition
- Author: David Weber, Steve White
- Illustrator: David Mattingly
- Cover artist: David Mattingly
- Language: English
- Series: Starfire series
- Genre: Science fiction
- Publisher: Baen Books
- Publication date: May 1997
- Publication place: United States
- Media type: Print (Paperback) & E-book
- Pages: 629
- ISBN: 0-671-87779-8
- OCLC: 36781354
- Preceded by: Crusade
- Followed by: The Shiva Option

In Death Ground is a 1997 military science fiction novel by American writer David Weber and Steve White. The story is completed in the novel The Shiva Option.

The title is taken from a passage in Chapter 11 of Sun Tzu's The Art of War: "In difficult ground, press on; On hemmed-in ground, use subterfuge; In death ground, fight." The original text is "圮地則行；圍地則謀；死地則戰"。

== Plot summary ==
The novel is set in a distant future. Following the accidental discovery of interstellar travel via 'warp points', humanity has expanded throughout space, evolving into a Terran Federation consisting of Core Worlds like Earth and Alpha Centauri, Corporate Worlds like Galloway's Star, and Fringe Worlds colonized by small groups of like-minded people seeking to preserve ethnic or cultural identities from getting lost in a cosmopolitan sameness. (Tensions exist between the three groups of worlds, and are further explored in Insurrection, another novel also written by Weber and White).

Following a series of three interstellar wars (ISWs 1–3) with different species (warlike felinoid Orions and their centauroid Gorm associates, birdlike Ophiuchi, the genocidal Rigelians, and the Thebans (explored in a prequel novel Crusade), humanity has experienced a seventy-year "vacation from history", i.e. seven decades of peace.

A survey squadron travels through a previously uncharted warp point and encounters a hive-like species referred to derisively as the 'Bugs' (inspired by the Arachnids in Robert A. Heinlein's Starship Troopers). All attempts at communication fail, and the Bugs ambush the survey squadron, with a great loss of material and human life. Pursuing the survivors, the Bugs mount a massive invasion of Terran and Orion space.

Satellites left behind monitor the conquered planets and reveal that Bugs regard other sentient life forms as food sources; indeed the Bugs prefer to consume their prey alive. It is later revealed that the Bugs raise ranches of conquered species.

The alternative being "equal opportunity genocide", Terrans, Orions, Gorm, and Ophiuchi form a Grand Alliance, with Terrans and Orions as the senior members. The novel features long and very detailed space and ground battle sequences, detailed discussions of tactical doctrine, the ongoing arms race between the Alliance and the Bugs, and the development of interpersonal relations between military people of different background and species.

The universe and novels are based on the Starfire wargame series, which David Weber helped to develop, and which has existed in various editions since 1976.
