= May Your Kindness Remain =

Studio album by Courtney Marie Andrews
- Released: March 23, 2018
- Genres: Americana; indie folk
- Length: 42:59
- Label: Fat Possum
- Producers: Mark Howard; Courtney Marie Andrews

Courtney Marie Andrews chronology
Honest Life (2016)	May Your Kindness Remain (2018)	Old Flowers (2020)

May Your Kindness Remain is the sixth studio album by the American singer-songwriter Courtney Marie Andrews. It was released on March 23, 2018, via Fat Possum Records.

== Critical reception ==
Professional ratings
Aggregate scores
Source	Rating
AnyDecentMusic?	7.5/10
Metacritic	79/100
Review scores
Source	Rating
AllMusic	4/5 stars
Financial Times	4/5 stars
The Guardian	5/5 stars
The Independent	3/5 stars
The Irish Times	4/5 stars
Mojo	4/5 stars
Paste	8.1/10
Q	4/5 stars
The Times	4/5 stars
Uncut	5/10

May Your Kindness Remain was met with generally favorable reviews from critics. At Metacritic, which assigns a weighted average rating out of 100 to reviews from mainstream publications, this release received an average score of 79, based on nine reviews. The aggregator AnyDecentMusic? has the critical consensus of the album at a 7.5 out of 10, based on fourteen reviews. The aggregator Album of the Year assessed the critical consensus as 78 out of 100, based on ten reviews.

=== Accolades ===
Publication	Accolade	Rank	Ref.
The Guardian	Best 25 Albums of 2018		
Paste	Best 50 Albums of 2018	21	
Rolling Stone	25 Best Country and Americana Albums of 2018		
Rough Trade	Top 100 Albums of 2018	91	
Uncut	75 Best Albums of 2018	25	

== Track listing ==
All tracks are written by Courtney Marie Andrews, except "Kindness of Strangers" (written with Jason Blynn and Peter Harper).

No.	Title	Length
1.	"May Your Kindness Remain"	3:54
2.	"Lift the Lonely from My Heart"	4:57
3.	"Two Cold Nights in Buffalo"	3:28
4.	"Rough Around the Edges"	4:11
5.	"Border"	3:55
6.	"Took You Up"	4:46
7.	"This House"	4:03
8.	"Kindness of Strangers"	3:30
9.	"I've Hurt Worse"	4:14
10.	"Long Road Back to You"	6:01
Total length:		42:59

== Personnel ==
Credits adapted from the album's liner notes.

- Courtney Marie Andrews – vocals, production (all tracks); electric guitar (track 1), acoustic guitar (2, 3, 5, 9, 10), harmony vocals (2, 3, 9), background vocals (8)
- Mark Howard – production, engineering
- Jason Kingsland – mixing
- Floyd Reitsma – additional engineering
- Ed Brooks – mastering
- Dillon Warnek – electric guitar (all tracks), space uke (9)
- William Mapp – drums, percussion
- Alex Sabel – bass
- Daniel Walker – organ (1–8, 10), Wurlitzer (2), accordion (9)
- Charles Wicklander – Wurlitzer (1, 3, 5, 10), piano (4, 6–10)
- C. C. White – background vocals (1, 3, 8, 10)
- Annie Jantzer – background vocals (8)
- Kara Hesse – background vocals (8)
- Laura E. Partain – photography
- Vincent Bancheri – design

== Charts ==
Chart (2018)	Peak position
Dutch Albums (Album Top 100)	185
UK Albums (Official Charts)	58
