= Exodus (White and Meier novel) =

2007 military science fiction novel by Steve White and Shirley Meier

- Cover Illustration.
- Author: Steve White and Shirley Meier
- Cover artist: Clyde Caldwell
- Language: English
- Series: Starfire series
- Genre: Science fiction
- Publisher: Baen Books
- Publication date: December 26, 2006
- Publication place: United States
- Media type: Print (Hardcover, Paperback) & E-book
- Pages: 288
- ISBN: 1-4165-2098-8
- OCLC: 71329882
- Preceded by: Insurrection
- Followed by: Extremis

Exodus is a 2007 military science fiction novel, and sequel to the "Stars at War" series, written by Steve White and Shirley Meier.

== Plot summary ==
Advanced aliens depart their homeworld in order to flee their stars impending nova.

Decades after the Terran Civil War the aliens arrive and attempt to colonize an inhabited human world. They are not able to recognize the intelligence of the planet's inhabitants, because they do not recognize human forms of communication as communication.

The miscommunication leads to warfare, where these new aliens throw themselves at their opponents with suicidal fury. The old "anti Bug" alliance partners join together to fight off this new threat.
