= A Christmas Carol (1997 film) =

1997 American animated musical film

- DVD cover
- Directed by: Stan Phillips
- Written by: Jymn Magon
- Based on: A Christmas Carol by Charles Dickens
- Produced by: Stan Phillips; Andy Heyward; Robby London
- Starring: Tim Curry; Whoopi Goldberg; Michael York; Ed Asner
- Music by: John Campbell; Megan Cavallari
- Production company: DIC Productions, L.P.
- Distributed by: 20th Century Fox Home Entertainment
- Release date: November 4, 1997
- Running time: 69 minutes
- Country: United States
- Language: English

A Christmas Carol is a 1997 American animated musical film version of the 1843 novella of the same name by Charles Dickens produced by DIC Productions, L.P. and distributed by 20th Century Fox Home Entertainment. It features eight original songs and stars the voice talents of Tim Curry, Whoopi Goldberg, Ed Asner, and Michael York. The film also features additional material such as Scrooge's pet bulldog, Debit.

Songs for the film were written by Megan Cavallari and David Goldsmith. The score was written by Megan Cavallari and John Campbell.

== Cast ==
- Tim Curry as Ebenezer Scrooge
- Whoopi Goldberg as Ghost of Christmas Present
- Michael York as Bob Cratchit
- Ed Asner as Jacob Marley's Ghost
- Frank Welker as Debit
- Kath Soucie as Mrs. Cratchit, Ghost of Christmas Past and Fan
- Jodi Benson as Belle
- Sam Saletta as Boy Scrooge
- Jarrad Kritzstein as Tiny Tim
- Additional voices: John Garry, Amick Byram, Ian Whitcomb, Joe Lala, David Wagner, Bettina Bush, Jerry Houser, Sam Saletta, Alan Shearman, Jarrad Kritzstein, Cathy Riso, Sidney Miller, Kelly Lester, Anna Mathias and Judy Ovitz

== Production ==
The animation was produced overseas by Han Yang Productions.

== Release ==
The film was released on Nickelodeon on December 8, 2002, as part of the Nickelodeon Sunday Movie Toons. It was released on DVD by 20th Century Fox Home Entertainment on October 12, 2004. This release lacks bonus material, as well as a main menu. The film is owned by WildBrain, which holds the rights to the DIC Movie Toons, as well as most of DIC's library.

=== Reception ===
Reviews for the film have been mixed. Colin Jacobson of DVD Movie Guide criticized the film for its "barely living up to Saturday morning standards" animation, lack of subtlety as for its morals, its "forgettable" songs, and the inclusion of Debit, making Scrooge's later transformation "less impressive and surprising". Some of the "notable" voice cast members were also noted for their "really poor" work. Daniel W. Kelly of DVD Talk also panned the film's new material put to "attract the attention of children", as well as the animation and the songs, the latter of which were compared with the ones in Mr. Magoo's Christmas Carol. Scott G. Mignola of Common Sense Media was also thoroughly critical of the film in his review.

== See also ==
- List of Christmas films
- List of ghost films
- Adaptations of A Christmas Carol
- Lists of animated films
