= Imperial Starfire =

Imperial Starfire is a 1993 supplement for Starfire published by Task Force Games.

== Contents ==
Imperial Starfire is a supplement in which players can generate whole star systems and races to populate them.

== Reception ==
Jason Fryer reviewed Imperial Starfire in White Wolf #41 (March, 1994), rating it a 4 out of 5 and stated that "Everything you need to create and run your own imperiums is provided in this expansion. The major problem I find is with starting play. As star systems are not provided, you must create those that are involved in your game. This can be a very long and tedious procedure."
