= Honest Life =

Studio album by Courtney Marie Andrews
- Released: August 19, 2016
- Studio: Studio Litho (Seattle, WA)
- Genre: Americana; indie folk
- Length: 36:39
- Label: Mama Bird Recording Co.

Courtney Marie Andrews chronology
On My Page (2013)	Honest Life (2016)	May Your Kindness Remain (2018)

Honest Life is the fifth studio album by American singer-songwriter Courtney Marie Andrews from Phoenix, Arizona. It was released on August 19, 2016, via Mama Bird Recording Co. Recording sessions took place at Studio Litho in Seattle.

== Critical reception ==
Professional ratings
Aggregate scores
Source	Rating
AnyDecentMusic?	7.2/10
Metacritic	82/100
Review scores
Source	Rating
American Songwriter	3.5/5 stars
Exclaim!	8/10
GIGsoup	81%
God Is in the TV	7/10
Paste	8.7/10
The Arts Desk	4/5 stars
The Guardian	3/5 stars
The Telegraph	5/5 stars

Honest Life was met with generally favorable reviews from critics. At Metacritic, which assigns a weighted average rating out of 100 to reviews from mainstream publications, this release received an average score of 82, based on eight reviews. The aggregator AnyDecentMusic? has the critical consensus of the album at a 7.2 out of 10, based on six reviews. The aggregator Album of the Year assessed the critical consensus as 79 out of 100, based on nine reviews.

Neil McCormick of The Telegraph praised the album, saying "If this was a debut, we would be hailing Andrews as a precocious young genius. But perhaps, in this age of acceleration, amid a pop blizzard of viral memes and instant digital fame, the slow maturing of a truly substantial talent is something to really celebrate". Eric R. Danton of Paste stated, "Like Harris, Andrews' voice can ring out with force of feeling even at its softest, and relying on nuance instead of vocal pyrotechnics turns the song into an intimate confession. She demonstrates that same good taste, and finely honed skill, throughout Honest Life, resulting in an album at once elegant and deeply moving". Harrison Moore of GIGsoup considered that "Courtney Marie Andrews returns with a coming of age album, rich with introspective lyrics and beautifully arranged". Peter Ellman of Exclaim! said, "Andrews grasps her songs tightly. Her lyrics are considered and heartfelt, her vocal performances are clean and pure and the songs are produced and arranged with nuance and precision". The Arts Desk's critic Matthew Wright wrote "she settles on image after image, all authentic and everyday, that distil the hurt and loneliness of break-up". Hal Horowitz of American Songwriter wrote, "Support by sparse but not stark backing, make these ballads glow and shine with a low key luster". Loz Etheridge of God Is in the TV stated, "Perhaps the most obvious comparison in terms of modern contemporaries is the impeccable Swedish duo First Aid Kit".

In a mixed review, The Guardian writer Caroline Sullivan noticed "The delicate lyrical barbs make Honest Life one to hear. It could have done with an upbeat song or two to puncture the introspection, but that's just being picky".

== Track listing ==
All tracks are written by Courtney Marie Andrews.

No.	Title	Length
1.	"Rookie Dreaming"	3:27
2.	"Not the End"	2:26
3.	"Irene"	3:46
4.	"How Quickly Your Heart Mends"	3:45
5.	"Let the Good One Go"	2:51
6.	"Honest Life"	4:14
7.	"Table for One"	3:59
8.	"Put the Fire Out"	3:39
9.	"15 Highway Lines"	4:22
10.	"Only in My Mind"	4:10
Total length:		36:39

== Personnel ==
- Courtney Marie Andrews – vocals, guitar, songwriting
- Abby Gundersen – harmony vocals
- Jonny Gundersen – harmony vocals
- Dillon Warnek – electric guitar
- Steve Norman – pedal steel guitar
- Charles Wicklander – piano
- Andrew Butler – organ
- Alex Sabel – bass
- William Mapp – drums
- Rebecca Chung – cello
- Andrew Joslyn – violin
- Floyd Reitsma – engineering, mixing, recording
- Ed Brooks – mastering
- Adam Gonsalves – lacquer cut
- Barna Howard – design
- Suzy Sundborg – photography

== Charts ==
Chart (2017)	Peak position
Belgian Albums (Ultratop Flanders)	132
