= Steve White (author) =

American writer

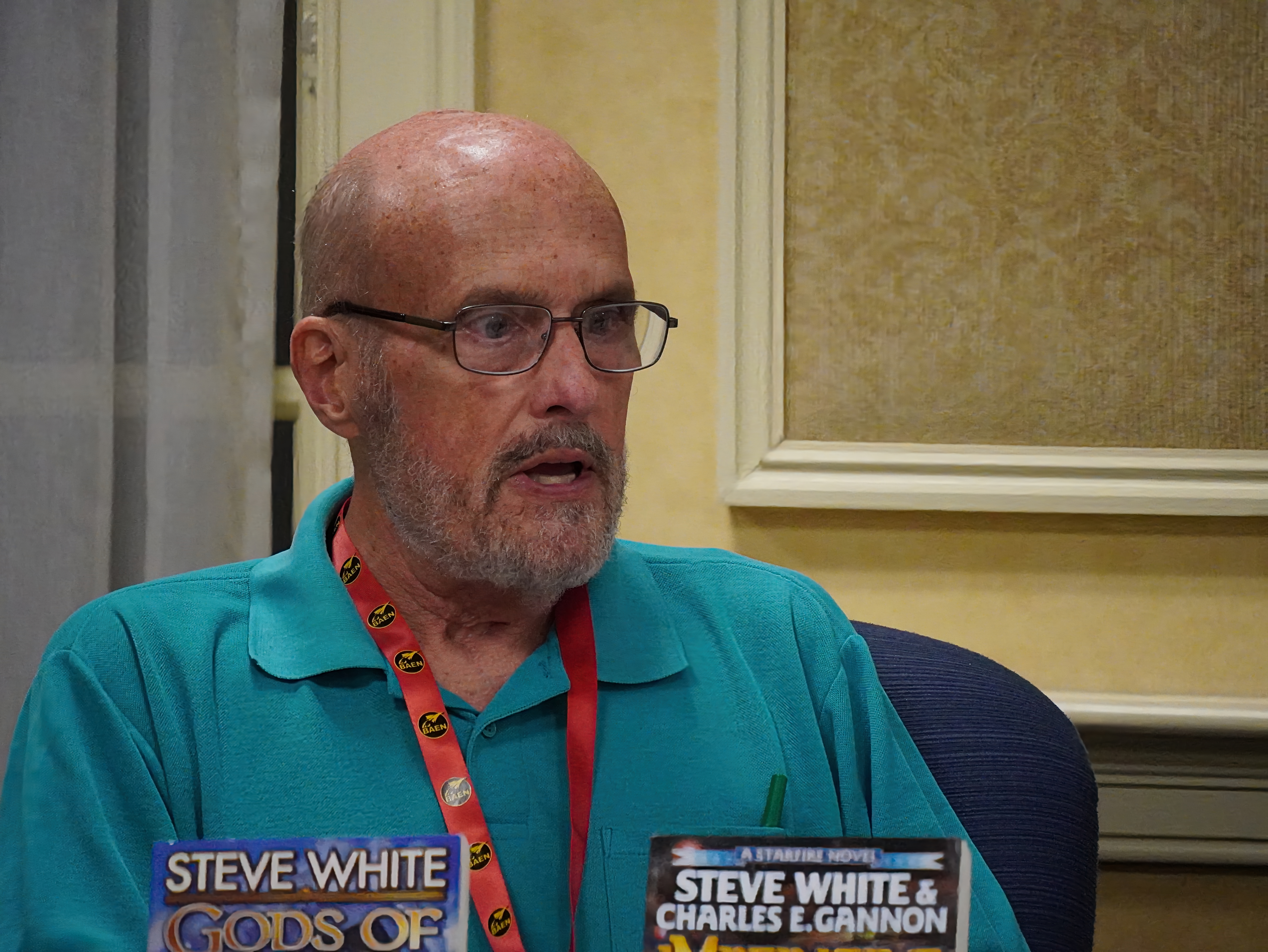
- White in 2023 at RavenCon
- Born: 1948; United States
- Died: July 2025 (aged 76–77)
- Occupation: Novelist
- Children: 3
- Writing career
- Genres: Science fiction, military science fiction
- Notable work: Starfire series

Stephen White (1948–2025) was an American science fiction author best known as the co-author of the Starfire series along with David Weber.

He was married, had three daughters and lived in Florida. He worked for many years as a writer at a legal publishing company. He previously served as a United States Navy officer and served during the Vietnam War and in the Mediterranean region.

White died in 2025 after a battle with cancer.

== Career ==
Stephen White wrote short stories set in the Starfire universe that were published by Task Force Games in their Nexus magazine, and wrote the Starfire novel Insurrection (1990) with David Weber after Nexus was cancelled in 1988; this book was the first in a tetralogy that concluded with their final collaboration, The New York Times bestseller The Shiva Option (2002). White also continued the series with Exodus (2007), co-authored with Shirley Meier.

== Published works ==
Prince of Sunset

- Prince of Sunset ISBN 0-671-87869-7 (1998)
- Emperor of Dawn ISBN 0-671-57797-2 (1999)

Starfire series

- Insurrection ISBN 0-671-72024-4 with David Weber (1990)
- Crusade ISBN 0-671-72111-9 with David Weber (1992)
- In Death Ground ISBN 0-671-87779-8 with David Weber (1997)
- The Shiva Option ISBN 0-671-31848-9 with David Weber (2002)
- Exodus ISBN 1-4165-2098-8 with Shirley Meier (2007)
- Extremis ISBN 1-4391-3433-2 with Charles E. Gannon (2011)
- Imperative ISBN 1-4767-8119-2 with Charles E. Gannon (2016)
- Oblivion ISBN 978-1-48148-325-4 with Charles E. Gannon (2018)
- The Stars at War ISBN 0-7434-8841-5 is an omnibus hardcover re-issue of Crusade and In Death Ground (2004)
- The Stars at War II ISBN 0-7434-9912-3 is an omnibus hardcover re-issue of The Shiva Option and Insurrection with 20,000 words of connecting material and restored edits (2005)

The Disinherited

- The Disinherited ISBN 0-671-72194-1 (1993)
- Legacy ISBN 0-671-87643-0 (1995)
- Debt of Ages ISBN 0-671-87689-9 (1995)

The Stars

- Eagle Against the Stars ISBN 0-671-57846-4 (2000)
- Wolf Among the Stars ISBN 978-1-4516-3754-0 (November 2011)

Jason Thanou

- Blood of the Heroes (2006) ISBN 978-1-4165-0924-0
- Sunset of the Gods (January 2013) ISBN 978-1-4516-3846-2
- Pirates of the Time Stream (August 2013) ISBN 978-1-4516-3909-4
- Ghosts of Time (July 2014) ISBN 978-1-4767-3657-0
- Soldiers Out of Time (August 2015) ISBN 978-1-4767-8072-6
- Gods of Dawn (August 2017) ISBN 978-1-4814-8257-8

The Jason Thanou short story "The Last Secret of Mary Bowser (2014)" was published before the release of Ghosts of Time at baen.com.

Other novels

- Forge of the Titans ISBN 0-7434-3611-3 (2003)
- Demon's Gate ISBN 0-7434-7176-8 (2004)
- The Prometheus Project ISBN 0-7434-9891-7 (2005)
- Saint Antony's Fire ISBN 1-4165-5598-6 (2008)
- Her Majesty's American ISBN 978-1481483421 (September 4, 2018)
