= Dying Star (album) =

Studio album by Ruston Kelly
- Released: September 7, 2018
- Studio: Sonic Ranch
- Genres: Folk rock; alternative country; indie folk
- Length: 53:17
- Label: Rounder
- Producers: Ruston Kelly; Jarrad Kritzstein

Ruston Kelly chronology
Halloween (2017)	Dying Star (2018)	Shape & Destroy (2020)

Singles from Dying Star
- 1. "Jericho" Released: June 22, 2018; 2. "Mockingbird" Released: July 16, 2018; 3. "Faceplant" Released: August 13, 2018; 4. "Son of a Highway Daughter" Released: October 22, 2018

Dying Star is the debut studio album by American country music singer-songwriter Ruston Kelly, released on September 7, 2018 through Rounder Records. The album was recorded at the Sonic Ranch in El Paso, Texas, and produced by Kelly and Jarrad Kritzstein. Dying Star received positive reviews from music critics who praised the songwriting. It spawned four singles: "Jericho", "Mockingbird", "Faceplant", and "Son of a Highway Daughter". To promote the record, Kelly headlined tours across the United States and the United Kingdom.

== Music and lyrics ==
The opening track "Cover My Tracks" is described as a "glistening acoustic pop song" that comes across as "Elliott Smith meets Shawn Colvin's "Sunny Came Home"." "Mockingbird" utilizes harmonica and steel guitar, and makes references to drugs and American actress Parker Posey. Kelly wrote the song in a Dominican hotel at six in the morning, saying he needed a "release from a cyclical pattern of a doomed relationship." "Son of a Highway Daughter" uses a Vocoder that's reminiscent of Imogen Heap's "Hide and Seek". "Paratrooper's Battlecry" was described by Ben Salmon of Paste as though it came from the sessions for Whiskeytown's 1997 album Strangers Almanac. "Faceplant" is an "infectious, tongue-in-cheek song about hitting rock bottom" that pays homage to "folk traditions with simple repetitive verses and turnarounds" that bring to mind songs by Woody Guthrie and John Prine. "Big Brown Bus" is a "piano-based power ballad" that uses pedal steel and is reminiscent of Jackson Browne. "Just for the Record" was described by Brittney McKenna of Rolling Stone as a "tender ballad about reflecting on past wrongs in a cherished relationship", and features Kelly's then-wife Kacey Musgraves on backing vocals.

== Tour ==
On June 24, 2018, Kelly announced a 29-city fall tour across the U.S. and the UK. Katie Pruitt and the Wandering Hearts were supporting acts. He then went on a 2019 tour across the same countries as the previous year's tour. Donovan Woods was a supporting act on select dates.

== Critical reception ==
Professional ratings
Aggregate scores
Source	Rating
Metacritic	73/100
Review scores
Source	Rating
AllMusic	3.5/5 stars
American Songwriter	3.5/5 stars
Paste	8.1/10

Dying Star garnered positive reviews from music critics. At Metacritic, which assigns a normalized rating out of 100 to reviews from mainstream critics, the album received an average score of 73, based on four reviews.

Paste contributor Ben Salmon called it "a very impressive effort from Kelly," praising his "perfectly fine-grit voice" and talent for "pairing heavy lyrics with remarkably graceful melodies" that showcase his "considerable chops within the country and folk arena", concluding that: "Dying Star is a dazzling deep-dive to rock bottom." AllMusic's Stephen Thomas Erlewine highlighted the vocoder use on "Son of a Highway Daughter, the psychedelic keyboards and steel guitar on "Anchors" and the "classic soul rhythms" on the title track, concluding that "[T]hese flourishes, along with Kelly's sharply honed wit, keep the otherwise moody and slow Dying Star from seeming somnolent, and they're enough to help steer attention away from the album's appealing nocturnal sheen and to the songcraft, which is sturdy and enduring." Jonathan Bernstein of American Songwriter praised Kelly's songwriting for bridging the gap between Music Row's wordplay and the "naked vulnerability" of Lucinda Williams and Heartbreaker-era Ryan Adams, and for crafting stories that "treats pain and despair with emotional dignity" and "articulate the limits of emotionally closed-off masculinity" through its characters. He concluded that: "If there's anything keeping Dying Star from being an outright classic, it's that Kelly can so effortlessly conjure up the regretful young man's blues that the nearly hour-long album can coast at times. But for the most part, Dying Star is a triumph."

== Track listing ==
No.	Title	Writer(s)	Length
1.	"Cover My Tracks"	Ruston Kelly, Jarrad Kritzstein	3:27
2.	"Mockingbird"	Kelly	4:38
3.	"Son of a Highway Daughter"	Kelly	3:37
4.	"Paratrooper's Battlecry"	Kelly	4:00
5.	"Faceplant"	Kelly, Kritzstein, Brendan Benson	3:43
6.	"Blackout"	Kelly, Kritzstein, Joy Williams	4:26
7.	"Big Brown Bus"	Kelly, Kritzstein, Rick Brantley	4:56
8.	"Mercury"	Kelly	3:19
9.	"Anchors"	Kelly, Kritzstein	4:10
10.	"Just for the Record"	Kelly, Kritzstein, Lucie Silvas	3:42
11.	"Trying to Let Her"	Kelly, Kyle Jacobs, Joe Leathers	3:28
12.	"Jericho"	Kelly, Williams, Natalie Hemby	2:53
13.	"Dying Star"	Kelly, Rollie Gaalswyk, Caitlyn Smith	5:26
14.	"Brightly Burst into the Air"	Kelly	1:32
Total length:			53:17

== Personnel ==
- Eli Beaird – bass
- Greg Calibi – mastering
- Ian Fitchuk – drums, organ, percussion, piano
- Charles Godfrey – engineer
- Matthew Glasbey – assistant
- Jon Green – background vocals
- Natalie Hemby – background vocals
- Ruston Kelly – engineer, acoustic guitar, harmonica, producer, vocals, xylophone
- Tim Kelly – pedal steel
- Jarrad Kritzstein – engineer, Fender Rhodes, electric guitar, producer, background vocals
- Kacey Musgraves – background vocals
- Mario Ramirez – assistant
- Kyle Ryan – banjo
- Andrew Scheps – mixing
- Abby Sevigny – background vocals
- Nick Steinhardt – art direction, design
- Joy Williams – background vocals
- Kate York – background vocals
