= Elohim (Elohim album) =

Studio album by Elohim
- Released: April 27, 2018
- Genre: Electropop
- Length: 43:15
- Label: BMG
- Producer: Cory Enemy; Jarrad Kritzstein; Danny Parra; Rock Mafia

Elohim chronology
Elohim (2016)	Elohim (2018)

Singles from Elohim
- 1. "Hallucinating" Released: September 7, 2016; 2. "Skinny Legs" Released: April 5, 2017; 3. "Sleepy Eyes" Released: July 28, 2017; 4. "The Wave" Released: September 29, 2017; 5. "Fuck Your Money" Released: January 28, 2018; 6. "Panic Attacks" Released: March 9, 2018; 7. "Half Love" Released: April 23, 2018

Elohim is the debut studio album by American electropop musician Elohim. It was self-released on April 27, 2018, with exclusive rights to BMG.

== Background ==
Speaking to Soundazed, Elohim said that the album "is a collection of everything that is me as I am growing, creating and learning."

Consisting of 15 songs, the album includes the singles "Hallucinating", released on September 7, 2016 with its music video directed by Chase o'Black premiering via Interview on November 21, 2016; "Skinny Legs", released on April 5, 2017 with its music video directed by Megan Park premiering on March 30, 2017, via Highsnobiety; "Sleepy Eyes" on July 28, 2017, along its lyric video; "The Wave" on September 29, 2017; "Fuck Your Money" on January 28, 2018 with its music video directed by Chase O’Black and Daniel Russell premiering via Noisey on February 20, 2018; "Panic Attacks" on March 9, 2018 with its music video premiering via The Fader on March 14, 2018 and "Half Love" on April 23, 2018, named its release day's "World Record" on Zane Lowe's Apple Music radio show Beats 1.

Dancing Astronaut described the album as "ringing with raw emotion; a conflict with her demons and her own skin."

== Track listing ==
No.	Title	Writer(s)	Length
1.	"Why Am I Like This?"	Jarrad Kritzstein; Elohim; Codi Caraco; Claudio Olachea	1:50
2.	"The Wave"	Elohim; Caraco; Kritzstein	3:10
3.	"Sleepy Eyes" (with Whethan)	Antonina Armato; Elohim; Tim James; Danny Parra; Kritzstein; Sofia Sarkisian; Caraco; Ethan Snoreck	3:22
4.	"Skinny Legs"	Elohim; Sonny DiPerri; Caraco; Parra	5:10
5.	"Fuck Your Money"	Armato; Elohim; James; Caraco; Parra	2:55
6.	"Hallucinating"	Armato; Elohim; Aaron G. Edwards; James; Caraco; Parra	3:38
7.	"The Universe Is Yours"	Armato; Elohim; James; Caraco; Parra	2:57
8.	"Enemies"	Elohim; DiPerri; Caraco; Parra	1:03
9.	"Panic Attacks" (featuring Yoshi Flower)	Elohim; Caraco; Joshua Smith	2:54
10.	"Silence Is Cool"	Elohim; DiPerri; Caraco; Parra	1:20
11.	"Half Love"	Armato; Elohim; James; Kritzstein; Caraco; Parra	3:45
12.	"I Want You"	Armato; Elohim; Cory Enemy; James; Caraco; Parra	4:07
13.	"Not Just Your Mama"	Armato; Berkowitz; Elohim; James; Nigel Lundemo; Caraco; Parra	3:00
14.	"Water Baby"	Elohim; Caraco	1:13
15.	"Insecure"	Armato; Elohim; Caraco; Parra; Smith	2:51
Total length:			43:15

== Charts ==
Chart (2018)	Peak position
US Top Dance Albums (Billboard)	16
