= Jarrad Kritzstein =

Jarrad K
- Born: Jarrad Halen Kritzstein; September 9, 1987 (age 39); Orange County, California, U.S.
- Occupations: Record producer; multi-instrumentalist; songwriter
- Instruments: Guitar; keyboards; bass; clarinet; vocals
- Website: jarradk.com

Jarrad Kritzstein (born September 9, 1987), also known as Jarrad K, is an American record producer, songwriter, filmmaker and actor. He is known for co-writing/producing Ruston Kelly's debut album Dying Star and Elohim's self-titled album.

== Early life and education ==
Kritzstein was born on September 9, 1987, in Orange County, California.

== Career ==
As a young man, Kritzstein starred as Jimmy Kidd on the PBS television show Wishbone, as well as voiced Tiny Tim in the animated A Christmas Carol.

Kritzstein has directed and produced various music videos for Baywood and Zak Waters, and has worked as a professional film/video editor from a very young age.

In 2011, Kritzstein collaborated with Australian artist Megan Washington to write/produce her single "Holy Moses", and "Insomnia" (the title track) from her EP Insomnia. Kritzstein has written and produced for Audra Mae, and played guitar in her band, The Almighty Sound. He also wrote and produced for Travis McCoy, Rosie Carney, Dappled Cities, Hungary Kids of Hungary and San Cisco. He is one half of the folk-duo, Baywood, alongside Denver native, Joe Ginsberg (bassist for Chuck Ragan, formerly of Single File).

As a filmmaker, Kritzstein directed Camp Woz: The Admirable Lunacy of Philanthropy, a documentary about ten challenged young men from New Jersey staying at the home of Apple co-founder, Steve Wozniak for a week of creativity and independence. The film won a Humanitarian Vision Award at the 2008 Newport Beach Film Festival.

In 2012, Kritzstein co-wrote a song, "To the Dreamers", for Australian singer Chloe Tully. He also co-produced the album Lake Air for the Australian band Dappled Cities.

In 2015 Kritzstein operated a recording studio called The Woods in Burbank, California.

In 2016 he moved to Nashville, Tennessee and toured extensively with artists Ruston Kelly and Lucie Silvas.

On February 1, 2019, his private recording studio Chateau Noir opened in East Nashville, Tennessee.

== Filmography ==
Year	Title	Role	Notes
1997	Wishbone	Jimmy Kidd	Recurring role
1997	A Christmas Carol	Tiny Tim (voice)	Direct-to-video
2001	Jacob's Gift	Marcus	Short
