= Elohim (musician) =

American musician

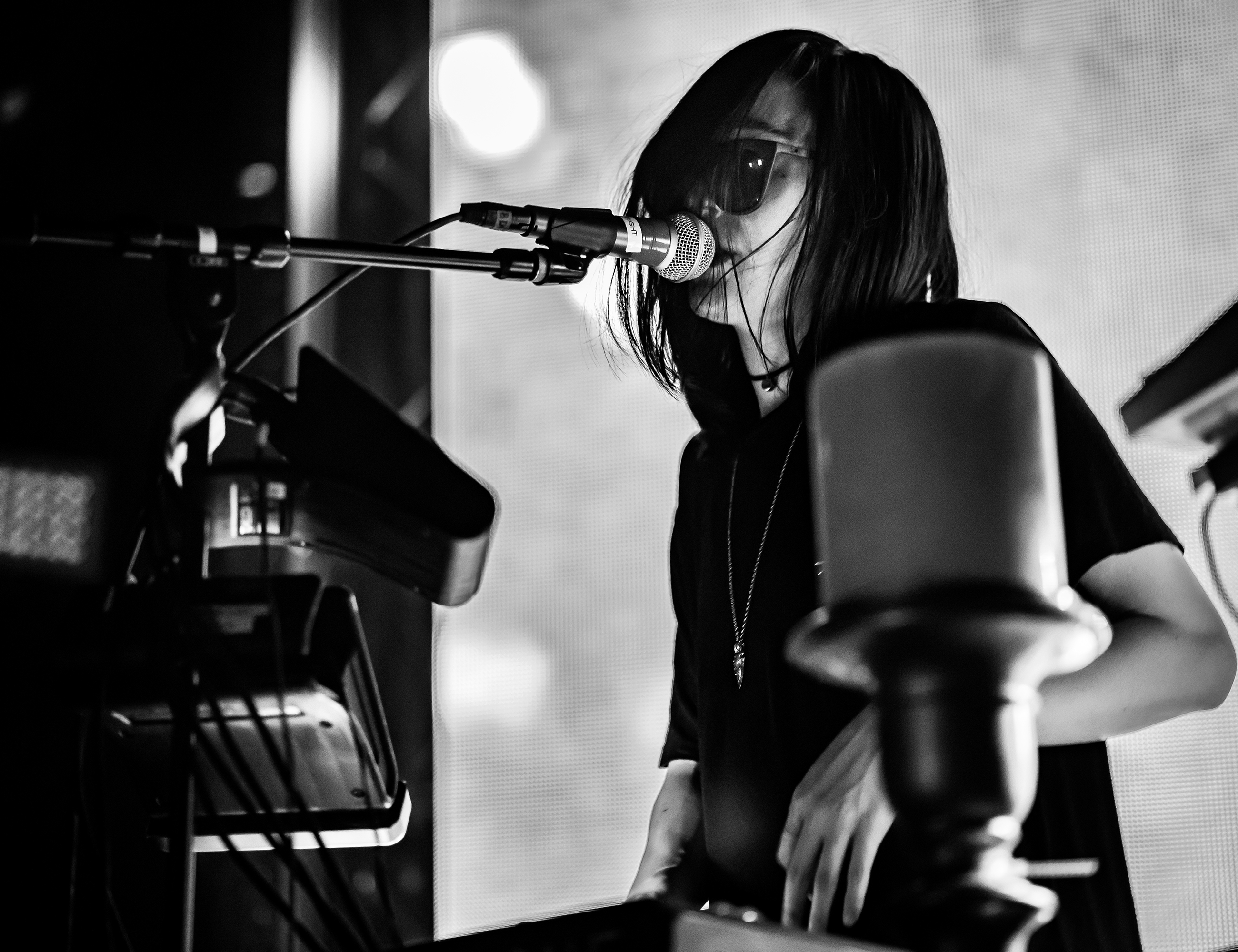
- Elohim performing in 2017
- Born: Codi Nicole Caraco; March 17, 1988 (age 38); Calabasas, California
- Occupations: Recording artist; DJ; producer; singer-songwriter
- Years active: 2015–present
- Musical career
- Genres: Electropop; synth-pop
- Labels: Owsla; Bertelsmann Music Group
- Website: elohimxelohim.com

Codi Nicole Caraco (born March 17, 1988), known professionally as Elohim, is an American electropop recording artist, DJ, producer and singer-songwriter based in Los Angeles, California.

== Career ==
At the age of five, Elohim began playing the piano and writing songs. She suffered from severe anxiety for most of her life, and has used music as a way to cope. The stage name "Elohim" is one of the Hebrew names for "God". The name inspired Elohim and moved her "in a really deep way" as it brought her "strength, solace, beauty and confidence."

Elohim's debut single is "Xanax", which was released in 2015 alongside other singles such as "She Talks Too Much" and "Bridge and the Wall", that are from her self-titled 2016 debut extended play. She also released "Half Love" as a single from her self-titled 2018 debut studio album. Elohim independently released the first part of her two-part album "Braindead" on May 10, 2019. In commemoration of Mental Health Awareness month, proceeds of the EP went towards various mental health initiatives. The EP deals heavily with the themes of mental illness. Elohim has supported various artists on tour including Blackbear, Louis The Child and The Glitch Mob. In February 2020 she embarked on a US tour called the "Group Therapy Tour." The tour was subsequently postponed due to COVID-19.

== Discography ==
=== Studio albums ===
Title	Details	Peak chart positions
Title	Details	US Dance
Elohim	Released: April 27, 2018; Label: BMG; Format: Digital download, CD	16

=== Extended plays ===
Title	Details
Elohim	Released: May 20, 2016; Label: BMG; Format: Digital download, CD
Braindead	Released: May 10, 2019; Label: Independent; Format: Digital download
Journey to the Center of Myself Vol. 1	Released: June 25, 2021; Label: Independent; Format: Digital download
Journey to the Center of Myself Vol. 2	Released: August 27, 2021; Label: Independent; Format: Digital download
Journey to the Center of Myself Vol. 3	Released: December 10, 2021; Label: Independent; Format: Digital download
Journey to the Center of Myself Vol. 4	Released: March 17, 2022; Label: Independent; Format: Digital download

=== Singles ===
Title	Year	Peak chart positions	Album
Title	Year	US Dance	Album
"Sleepy Eyes" (with Whethan)	2017	36	Elohim
"Love Is Alive" (Louis the Child featuring Elohim)	2017	42	Non-album single
"Half Love"	2018	46	Elohim
"Connect"	2018	—	Non-album singles
"Buckets"	2018	—	Non-album singles
"TV"	2018	—	Non-album singles
"Room to Fall" (Marshmello and Flux Pavilion featuring Elohim)	2019	19	Joytime III
"Group Therapy"	2020	—	Non-album singles
"I'm Lost"	2020	—	Non-album singles
"Bring Me Back" (with Griz)	2021	—	Non-album singles
"Be Ok" (with Ookay and Flux Pavilion)	2021	—	Non-album singles
"Losing My Mind" (with Party Favor)	2021	—	Non-album singles
"Nothing Good Comes Easy" (with Felix Cartal)	2022	—	Non-album singles
"—" denotes a recording that did not chart or was not released.
