= Kate York =

American singer-songwriter

Kate York (born 1976 or 1977) is a singer-songwriter known for her work on the TV show Nashville.

== Music career ==
Born in southern California, York moved to Nashville, Tennessee, in 1999.

York has been part of several bands, including Skyline Motel (with Sarah Buxton, Daniel Tashian, and Ian Fitchuk) and Thompson, York & Nash (with Leigh Nash and Megan Thompson).

York has co-written songs for and with a number of recording artists, including Jonny Diaz, Fall Out Boy, Foreigner, Mat Kearney, Lady A, and Little Big Town. She secured sync placements in TV series such as Atypical, Batwoman, Grey's Anatomy, and Virgin River and films such as After, New Years Eve, and Wild Rose.

York achieved notoriety through her contribution of nearly twenty songs to the TV series Nashville. One of her songs, "Nothing in This World Will Ever Break My Heart Again" (co-written with Buxton), received a Primetime Emmy Award nomination for Outstanding Original Music and Lyrics. The nomination was pulled, however, because the song was not written for a show character, which was one of the nomination requirements.

York's most critically acclaimed song (as of December 2021) is "Glasgow (No Place Like Home)" (co-written with Mary Steenburgen and Caitlyn Smith), which was featured in the 2018 film Wild Rose. The song made the Oscar short list and received best original song nominations from the Chicago Indie Critics Awards, the Gold Derby Awards, the Guild of Music Supervisors, the Latino Entertainment Journalists Association, Music City Film Critics' Association, and the Online Film & Television Association. It won the 2020 best original song award from the Awards Circuit Community Awards, Critics Choice Movies Awards, Denver Film Critics Society, Georgia Film Critics Association, Hollywood Critics Association, Houston Film Critics Society, International Online Cinema Awards, and the North Dakota Film Society.

=== Songwriting credits on Nashville ===
The following is a list of songs which York wrote or cowrote for the 2012 TV series Nashville. Co-writers in parentheses.

- "All We Ever Wanted" (Matraca Berg)
- "Anywhere From Here" (Sarah Buxton and Sarah Siskind)
- "Believing" (Tami Hinesh and Emily Shackelton)
- "Breathe In" (Allen Salmon and Andrew Combs)
- "Everything I'll Ever Need" (Dylan Altman)
- "For Your Glory" (Leeland Mooring and Jack Mooring)
- "Heart on Fire" (Buxton and Blair Daly)
- "I Will Fall" (Tyler James)
- "I Will Never Let You Know" (Erin McCarley and Kevin Rhoads)
- "Keep Asking Why (McCarley)
- "Little Fire" (Buxton and Lennon Stella)
- "The Night Is Still Young" (Siskind)
- "Nothing in This World Will Ever Break My Heart Again" (Buxton)
- "One Works Better" (Tofer Brown, Rosi Golan, and Natalie Hemby)
- "Stronger Than Me" (Buxton)
- "Trouble Is" (Marv Green)
- "Your Love Keeps Me Alive" (Siskind)

=== Other songwriting credits ===
Co-writers in parentheses.

- "Bad Guy" (Mindy Smith and Betsy Roo)
- "Breakaway" (Stella and Jarryd James)
- "Can't Go Back" (Hemby and Golan)
- "Christmas for Two" (Leigh Nash)
- "Church" (Fall Out Boy, Audra Mae, and Andrew Wells)
- "Eternal Gifts"
- "Give My Life for Love" (Mick Jones, Marti Frederiksen, and Cliff Downs)
- "Glasgow (No Place Like Home)" (Mary Steenburgen and Caitlyn Smith)
- "More Beautiful You" (Jonny Diaz)
- "On & On" (Mat Kearney)
- "Smoking Your Weed" (Lucie Silvas and Josh Osborne)
- "Strong and Silent" (Kree Harrison and Fancy Hagood)
- "The Thing That Wrecks You" (Daniel Tashian and Tenille Townes)
- "One Less Question" (Madi Diaz and Lennon Stella)

=== Albums ===
- Kate York (2004)
- Sadlylove (2006)
- For You (2008)
- Fly Away (2011)
- New (2012)
- Kate York and Joe Pisapia (2016)
- Out of My Head (2019)

=== Photography ===
York is also a photographer. She and Sonya Jasinski produced the book Nashville: Behind the Curtain, which included candid photographs of the people and place of the titular city.
