= Ruston Kelly =

American singer-songwriter (born 1988)

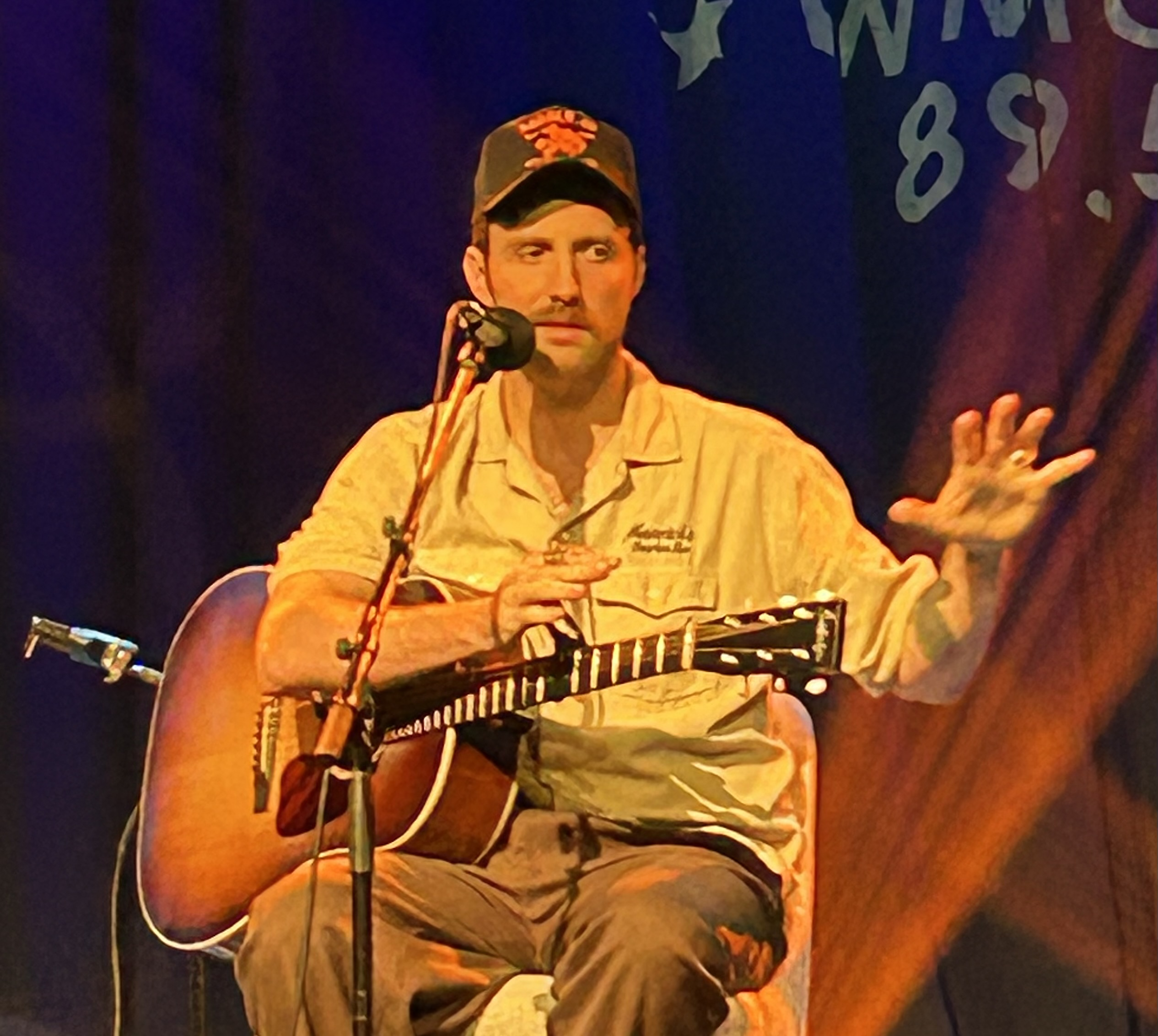
- Kelly performing for WMOT Roots Radio in August 2025
- Born: Ruston Samuel Kelly; July 31, 1988 (age 38); Georgetown, South Carolina, U.S.
- Spouses: Kacey Musgraves (m. 2017; div. 2020); Tia Cubelic (m. 2026)
- Musical career
- Genres: Country; alternative country; Americana; pop rock
- Occupation: Singer-songwriter
- Instruments: Vocals; guitar; mandolin; harmonica
- Years active: 2013–present
- Labels: Razor & Tie; Rounder Records

Ruston Samuel Kelly (born July 31, 1988) is an American singer-songwriter. After signing with the music publisher BMG Nashville in 2013, his song "Nashville Without You" appeared on Tim McGraw's album Two Lanes of Freedom. Following a record deal with Razor & Tie's Washington Square, he released his debut EP, Halloween, produced by Mike Mogis in 2017.

In 2018, Kelly signed with Rounder Records and released his debut studio album, Dying Star, to generally favorable critical reviews.

In 2020, Kelly released Shape & Destroy.

== Personal life ==
Ruston Kelly was born in South Carolina and comes from a musical family. The family moved frequently because of his father's job, and he lived in Wyoming, Ohio for nearly eight years. Kelly began playing music and writing songs when he was a teenager. Kelly attended Belmont University in Nashville, Tennessee.

Kelly struggled with drug addiction for years and decided to pursue a life of sobriety following an overdose in December 2015. Regarding his recovery he stated, "I went to rehab once, but it was all I could afford, so it was this kind of rehab in North Carolina."

Kelly met singer Kacey Musgraves after performing at the Bluebird Café in Nashville in March 2016. They married in October 2017 and filed for divorce in July 2020.

Kelly married Tia Cubelic in May 2026.

== Discography ==
=== Studio albums ===
- Dying Star (2018)
- Shape & Destroy (2020)
- The Weakness (2023)
- Pale, Through the Window (2025)

=== EPs ===
- The Bootleg Sessions (2013)
- Halloween (2017)
- Dirt Emo Vol. 1 (2019)
- Weakness, Etc. (2024)
- Dirt Emo Vol. 2 (2025)

=== Singles ===
- "Asshole (Demo)" (2018)
- "Mockingbird" (2018) - No. 25 Adult Alternative Airplay
- "Weeping Willow" (2019)
- "Brave" (2020)
- "O Holy Night" (2022)
- "The Weakness" (2023) - No. 35 Adult Alternative Airplay

== Tours ==
Headlining

- Dying Star Fall Tour (2018–2019)
- Shape and Destroy Fall Tour (2021)
- The Weakness Tour (2023)
- Too Chill to Kill Tour (2024)

Opening act

- Port Saint Joe Tour (for Brothers Osborne) (2019)
- The Stick Season Tour (for Noah Kahan) (2023)

== Songwriting contributions ==
Year	Artist	Album	Title	Co-writers
2013	Tim McGraw	Two Lanes of Freedom	"Nashville Without You"	Kyle Jacobs, Joe Leathers
2014	Josh Abbott Band	Tuesday Night EP	"Tuesday Night"	Josh Abbott
2015	Josh Abbott Band	Front Row Seat	"Front Row Seat"	Brian Davis
2016	Rob Baird	Wrong Side of the River	"Run of Good Luck"	Rob Baird
2016	Hayes Carll	Lovers and Leavers	"Love Is So Easy"	Hayes Carll
2018	Lucie Silvas	E.G.O.	"Just for the Record"	Lucie Silvas, Jarrad Kritzstein
