= Starfire II =

Starfire II is a 1980 board wargame published by Task Force Games.

== Gameplay ==
Starfire II is a game involving space ship-to-ship battles.

== Reception ==
Stefan Jones reviewed Starfire II in The Space Gamer No. 35. Jones commented that "Despite its flaws, I recommend Starfire II. It is quick-playing and fun."

== Reviews ==
- Dragon #47 (March 1981)
- Dragon #59
- Ares Magazine #8
