= 1979 in games =

This page lists board and card games, wargames, miniatures games, and tabletop role-playing games published in 1979. For video games, see 1979 in video gaming.

== Games released or invented in 1979 ==
- 4th Dimension
- Asteroid Zero-Four
- The Awful Green Things from Outer Space
- The Beastlord
- Belter
- Bloodtree Rebellion
- Cerberus
- Cheops
- Chinese Farm (2nd edition)
- Circus Maximus
- Colony Delta
- The Creature That Ate Sheboygan
- Darkover
- Demons
- Divine Right
- Double Star
- Dune
- Earth Game
- The Farming Game
- Freedom in the Galaxy
- Godsfire
- Guess Who?
- Holy War
- Hot Spot
- Invasion of the Air-eaters
- John Carter: Warlord of Mars
- King Arthur
- Knights and Knaves
- The Legend of Robin Hood
- MAATAC
- The Mad Magazine Card Game
- The Mad Magazine Game
- Magic Realm
- Magic Wood
- Marine: 2002
- Napoleon at Leipzig
- Prochorovka: Armor at Kursk
- Sigma Omega
- Snapshot
- Space Future
- Sqwurm
- Star Fleet Battles
- Star Quest
- Starfall
- Starfire
- StarGate
- Streets of Stalingrad
- Survival / The Barbarian
- Swordquest
- Time War
- Titan Strike!
- Trivial Pursuit
- Vector 3
- Villains and Vigilantes (tabletop role-playing game)
- War of the Sky Cities
- Wizard's Quest
- Zargo's Lords

== Games awards given in 1979 ==
- Spiel des Jahres: Hare and Tortoise (first year given)

== Significant game-related events in 1979 ==
- Task Force Games was founded by Allen Eldridge and Stephen Cole.

== Deaths ==
Date	Name	Age	Notability
May	Charles Grant		Wargames author

== See also ==
- 1979 in video gaming
