= Game balance =

Concept in game design

Game balance is a branch of game design with the intention of improving gameplay and user experience by balancing difficulty and fairness. Game balance consists of adjusting rewards, challenges, and/or elements of a game to create the intended player experience.

== Overview and development ==
Game balance is generally understood as introducing a level of fairness for the players. This includes adjusting difficulty, win-loss conditions, game states, economy balancing, and so on to work in tandem with each other. The concept of game balance depends on the game genre. Most game designers agree that game balancing serves towards providing an engaging player experience, especially through a meta.

Game balance is commonly discussed among game designers, some of whom include Ernest Adams, Jeannie Novak, Ian Schreiber, David Sirlin, and Jesse Schell. The topic is also featured in many YouTube channels specializing in game design topics, including Extra Credits, GMTK and Adam Millard.

== Terms specific to game balance ==
=== PvP, PvE and co-op games ===
Player versus player (PvP) describes games that feature a competition between players. PvE is an acronym for player versus environment, where players instead compete with the environment and non-player characters (NPCs).

Co-op is short for "cooperative" and refers to PvE and PvP games where you can work with other players.

=== Game elements ===
Game elements are things that appear within a video game that contribute to the gameplay experience. In most game design frameworks, game elements are categorized into groups to help describe their roles in the games. A game element refers to anything ranging from a player's special ability to the relations between different game mechanics in a game.

=== Game mechanics ===
Game mechanics are constructs that let the player interact with the game world. They define the goal, how players can achieve them and how they cannot, and what happens when they try. These would include challenges, competitive or cooperative gameplay, win-loss conditions and states, feedback loops, and how they relate to one another. Like game balance, the terminology behind game mechanics can vary depending on the designer or the resource's author.

=== Buffs and nerfs ===
Buffs are changes to a game which increase the utility of game elements, items, environments, mechanics and so on, while nerfs are changes that decrease the utility of said game elements and alike. Buffs and nerfs are common methods for adjusting the challenge for the player. Both can be achieved indirectly by changing other elements and mechanics or introducing new ones. Both terms can also be used as verbs for the act of making such a change. The first established use of the term "nerf" was in Ultima Online, as a reference to the Nerf brand of toys due to their soft toy bullets. However, there is no concrete evidence to show where the term "buff" came from. It has been perceived that the term came from bodybuilding culture, where it is a slang term which refers to an individual's large musculature as a result of strength-based exercises.

The most popular use of these terms is found in most MMORPGs, where game designers use buffs and nerfs to maintain game balance shortly after introducing a new feature that may cause significant changes to the game's mechanics. This is sometimes due to a method of using or acquiring the object that was not considered by the developers. The frequency and scale of nerfing vary widely from game to game, but almost all MMOs have engaged in nerfing at some point.

Nerfs in various online games, such as Anarchy Online, have spurred in-world protests. Since many items in virtual worlds are sold or traded among players, a nerf may have an outsized impact on the virtual economy. As players respond, the nerf may cause prices to fluctuate before settling down in a different equilibrium. This impact on the economy, along with the original impact of the nerf, can cause large player resentment for even a small change. In particular, in the case of items or abilities which have been nerfed, players can become upset over the perceived wasted efforts in obtaining the now nerfed features. For games where avatars and items represent significant economic value, this may bring up legal issues over the lost value.

=== Overpowered and underpowered ===
The terms "overpowered" (OP) and "underpowered" (UP) are used on game elements and mechanics that are too good or bad to describe a lack of game balance. More precisely, if a game element is too strong even with the highest possible cost, it is overpowered. If it is too weak even with the lowest possible cost, it is underpowered. On the other hand, a game element might simply be too expensive or not expensive enough for the benefit it provides.

Colloquially, overpowered is often used when describing a specific class in an RPG, a specific faction in strategic games, or a specific tactic, ability, weapon or unit in various games. For something to be deemed overpowered, it is either the best choice in a disproportionate number of situations (marginalizing other choices) and/or excessively hard to counter by the opponent compared to the effort required to use it.

Underpowered often refers to when describing a specific class in an RPG, a specific faction in strategic games, or a specific tactic, ability, weapon or unit in various games as far weaker than average, resulting in it being always one of the worst options to pick in most situations. In such way, it is often marginalized by other choices, due to being inherently weaker than similar options or much more easily countered by opponents.

=== Gimp ===
A gimp is a character, character class or character ability that is underpowered in the context of the game (e.g. a close range warrior class equipping a full healing boosting armor set, despite having no healing abilities). Gimped characters lack effectiveness compared to other characters at a similar level of experience. A player may gimp a character by assigning skills and abilities that are inappropriate for the character class, or by developing the character inefficiently. However, this is not always the case, as some characters are purposely "gimped" by the game's developers in order to provide an incentive for raising their level, or to give the player an early head-start. An example of this is Final Fantasy's Mystic Knight class, which starts out weak, but is able to become the most powerful class if brought to a very high level. Gimps may also be accidental on the part of the developer, and may require a software patch to balance.

Sometimes, especially in MMORPGs, gimp is used as a synonym for nerf to describe a rule modification that weakens the affected target. Unlike the connotatively neutral term nerf, gimp in this usage often implies that the rule change unfairly disadvantages the target.

=== Revamp ===
A revamp (or rework) is a significant change to a game that is designed to improve (or balance out) the game's overall quality. This can include changes to the game's mechanics, art style, storyline, or any other aspect of the game. Revamps are often done in response to player feedback or to address problems that have been identified with the game. They can also be done simply to refresh the game and keep it feeling fresh for players.

Revamps can happen at any time during a game's development or after its release. The difference between a revamp and a remaster is that a remaster is simply an updated version of the game with better graphics and maybe some new content, while a revamp is a completely new game built on the foundation of the original.

Revamps may be optional and may happen if something is not properly nerfed.

== Essential concepts of balancing ==
=== Chance ===
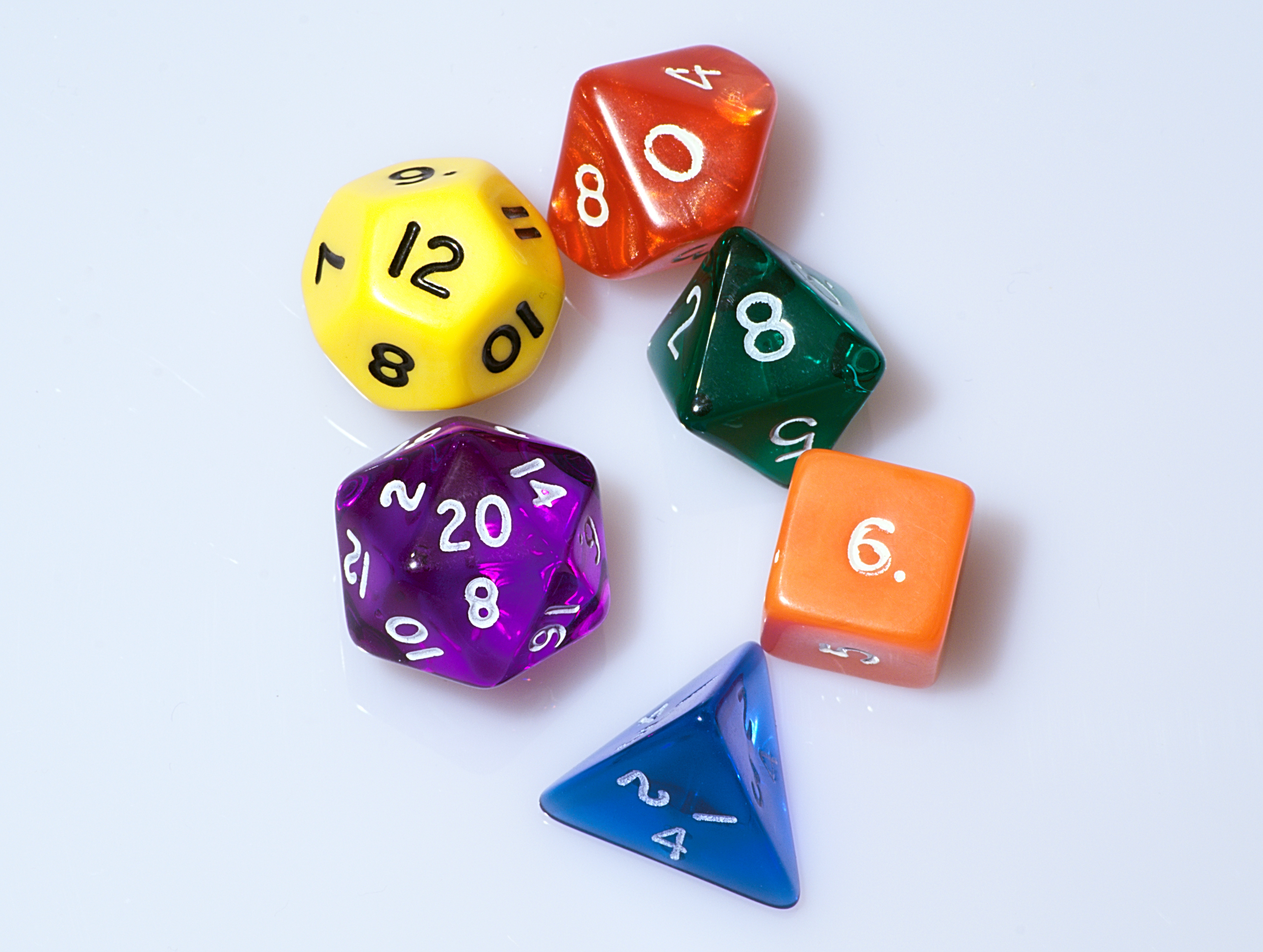
Dice add an element of chance to a game.

While the optimal ratio between skill and chance are dependent on the target group, the outcome should be more influenced by skill. Chance and skill are viewed as partial opposites. Chance allows a weaker player to beat a stronger one. Generally, it is advised to favor many small random elements with little influence over a few with large effects to make results, that differ highly from average, less likely. The player should also receive a certain degree of information and control over random elements.

=== Difficulty ===
Difficulty is especially important for PvE-games, but has at least some significance for PvP-games regarding the usability of game elements. The perception of the difficulty depends on mechanics and numbers, but also on the players abilities and expectations. The ideal difficulty therefore depends on individual player and should put the player in a state of flow. Consequently, for the development, it can be useful or even necessary to focus on a certain target group. Difficulty should increase throughout the game since players get better and usually unlock more power. Achieving all those goals is problematic since, among other things, skill cannot be measured objectively and testers also get continuously better. In any case, difficulty should be adjustable for or by the player in some way.

=== Dynamic and static balance ===
Game balance can be divided into a dynamic and a static component. Static balance is mostly concerned with a game's rules and elements, everything, that is set before a game or match starts. An example would be like player health and ammo left. Dynamic balance conversely describes the balance between players, environment and computer opponents and how it changes throughout the game. An example would be moving objects in a game environment

=== Economies ===
Within a game, everything that has an owner or is provided to a player can be called a resource. This includes commodities, units, tokens, but also information or time, for example. Those resource systems are similar to real economies, especially in regards to trading resources. There are some distinctions for video games though: There are open economies, that receive additional resources, but also closed ones that do not. Additionally, economies might provide indefinite resources, or all players have to share a set amount instead. Especially for online games, it therefore is important to design economies to make them “fun” and sustainable.

=== Fairness ===
A game is fair if all players have roughly the same chance of winning at the start independently of which offered options they choose. This makes fairness especially important for PvP games. Fairness also means, even for PvE games, that the player never feels like the opponents are unbeatable.

Chris Crawford wrote in 1982 of the importance of a game's "illusion of winnability" providing an ongoing motivation to play, describing Pac-Man as being popular because it "appears winnable to most players, yet is never quite winnable".

When defeated "the player must perceive", Computer Gaming World wrote in 1984, "that failure was the player's fault (not the game's) but can be corrected by playing better the next time". The illusion of winnability, Crawford said, "is very difficult to maintain. Some games maintain it for the expert but never achieve it for the beginner; these games intimidate all but the most determined players", citing Tempest as an example.

Tim Barry of InfoWorld wrote in 1981 that any good computer game "must be totally fair", although it could still be "complicated or random or appear unfair". Fairness does not necessarily mean that a game is balanced. This is particularly true of action games: Jaime Griesemer, design lead at Bungie, states that "every fight in Halo is unfair". This potential for unfairness creates uncertainty, leading to the tension and excitement that action games seek to deliver. In these cases balancing is instead the management of unfair scenarios, with the ultimate goal of ensuring that all of the strategies which the game intends to support are viable. The extent to which those strategies are equal to one another defines the character of the game in question.

Simulation games can be balanced unfairly in order to be true to life. A wargame may cast the player into the role of a general who was defeated by an overwhelming force, and it is common for the abilities of teams in sports games to mirror those of the real-world teams they represent regardless of the implications for players who pick them.

Player perception can also affect the appearance of fairness. Sid Meier stated that he omitted multiplayer alliances in Civilization because he found that the computer was almost as good as humans in exploiting them, which caused players to think that the computer was cheating.

Game designer Dani Bunten, when asked how to balance gameplay, gave the one-word response of "Cheat." Asked how to respond to complaints about this from gamers, she said, "Lie!"

=== Meaningful decisions ===
Meaningful decisions are decisions whose alternatives are neither without any effect nor is one alternative clearly the best. This would make, for example, choosing between the numbers of a dice meaningless if 6 always gives the greatest benefit. This example is a dominant strategy, the most damaging type of meaningless decision, since it doesn't leave a reason to choose any alternative. Meaningful decisions consequently are a central part of the interactive medium games. Meaningless decisions, also called trivial decisions, do not add anything desirable to a game. They might actually harm the game by unnecessarily making it more complex. Additionally, a higher number of meaningful decisions can also make a game just more complex. Offered decisions should always be meaningful though. However, for the balancing irrelevant decisions might still influence the players experience, e.g. a decision between cosmetic alternatives like skins.

==== Strategies ====
Strategies are specific combinations of actions to achieve a certain goal. Classic examples for this are a rush or focusing on economy in a real-time strategy game. Not only elementary decisions within a strategy, e.g. between game elements, also the decision between strategies should remain meaningful.

==== Dominant strategies ====
A dominant strategy is a strategy that is always the most likely to lead to success, making it objectively the best strategy. This therefore renders all related decisions meaningless. Even if a strategy does not always win, but clearly is the best, it can be called (almost) dominant. Dominant strategies damage games and should strongly be avoided when possible. However, there is no objective border when a slightly better strategy becomes dominant.

=== Metagame ===
Metagame describes a game around the actual game, including discussions, like in forums, interactions between players, e.g. on local tournaments, but also the influence of extrinsic factors like finances. The “Meta”, as it is also called, can act as a self-balancing force, since counters to popular strategies become widely known and lead to players changing their play behavior appropriately. This self-balancing force should not prevent developers from intervening in extreme cases of imbalance though.

=== Positive and negative feedback ===
Positive and negative feedback, also called positive and negative feedback loop, essentially describes game mechanics that reward or punish playing (usually well or bad) with power or the loss of it. Therefore, success leads to more power within a positive loop and therefore accelerates progress further, while a negative loop decreases power or adds additional costs to it. Feedback loops should be implemented carefully to only target the correct player, or otherwise they might determine the outcome too early or achieve nothing but simply delay the end of the game.

Many games become more challenging if the player is successful. For instance, real-time strategy games often feature "upkeep", a resource tax that scales with the number of units under a player's control. Team games which challenge players to invade their opponents' territory (football, capture the flag) have a negative feedback loop by default: the further a player pushes, the more opponents they are likely to face.

Many games also feature positive feedback loops – where success (for example capturing an enemy territory) leads to greater resources or capabilities, and hence greater scope for further successes (for example further conquests or economic investments). The overall dynamic balance of the game will depend on the comparative strength of positive and negative feedback processes, and therefore decreasing the power of positive feedback processes has the same effect as introducing negative feedback processes. Positive feedback processes may be limited by making capabilities some concave function of a measure of raw success. For example:

1. In RPG (role-playing games) using a level structure, the level attained is usually a concave transformation of experience points – as the character becomes more proficient, they can defeat more powerful adversaries, and hence can earn more experience points in a given period of playtime – but conversely more experience points are required to 'level up'. In this case, the players level and perhaps also power does not improve exponentially, but approximately linearly in playing time.
2. In many military strategy games, the conquest of new territory only gives a marginal increase in power – for example the 'home province' may be exceptionally productive, whereas new territories open to acquisition might only have by comparison slight resources, or may be prone to revolts or public order penalties which reduce their ability to provide significant net resources, after resources are allocated to adequately suppressing revolts. In this case, a player with initially impressive successes may become 'overextended' attempting to hold may regions which provide only marginal increases in resources.
3. In many games there is little or no advantage in acquiring a large horde of some particular item. For example, having a large and varied cache of equipment or weapons is an advantage, but only weakly over a somewhat smaller horde with a similar degree of diversity – for example only one weapon can be used at a time, and having another in an inventory with very similar capabilities offers only marginal gain. In more general terms, capabilities may depend on some bottleneck where there is no or only weak positive feedback.

Strongly net negative feedback loops can lead to frequent ties. Conversely, if there is on net a strong positive feedback loop, early successes can multiply very rapidly, leading to the player eventually attaining a commanding position from which losing is almost impossible. See also dynamic game difficulty balancing.

=== Power and costs ===
Power is everything that provides an advantage, while costs are essentially everything that is a disadvantage. Therefore, power and costs can be viewed as positive and negative values of the same scale. This allows calculations with both of them at the same time. Sometimes, it is only a matter of perspective if something is an advantage or a disadvantage: Is it a benefit to have bonus damage against dragons? Or is it a drawback not to receive it against other targets? A crucial part of game balancing consists in relating power and costs to each other and find a suitable relation in the first place, e.g. a power curve. In addition to that, costs might not be explicitly quantified: Spending gold on something from any finite amount limits future purchases. Also, certain investments might have prerequisites before they even become available. Sometimes, a game does not even show disadvantages. All of this can be referred to as shadow costs.

=== Rewards ===
Players desires rewards, e.g. new game content or a simple compliment. Rewards get bigger as the playtime increases thus giving players a feeling of progress. Some uncertainty about rewards makes them more desirable for many players.

=== Solvability ===
Colloquially speaking, solving a game refers to winning it or reaching its end. Ian Schreiber calls a game solvable if, for every situation, there is a recognizable best action. Generally, it is undesirable if a game can easily be solved, since this makes decisions meaningless, and games become boring faster.

There are multiple tiers of solvability: A game might be trivial to solve, but it might also be solvable only in theory with a lot of computing effort. Even games with random elements are solvable since a best action can be found using expected values. Besides high complexity, hidden information and the influence of other human players are what makes it impossible for a human to completely solve a game.

=== Symmetry and asymmetry ===
Symmetric games offer all players identical starting conditions and are therefore automatically fair in the above stated sense. While they are easier to balance, they still must be balanced, e.g. regarding their game elements. Most modern games are asymmetric though, while the grade of asymmetry can vary greatly. Fairness becomes even more important for those.

Giving each player identical resources is the simplest game balancing technique. Most competitive games feature some level of symmetry; some (such as Pong) are completely symmetric, but those in which players alternate turns (such as chess) can never achieve total symmetry as one player will always have a first-move advantage or disadvantage.

Symmetry is unappealing in games because both sides can and will use any effective strategy simultaneously, or success depends on a very small advantage such as one pawn in chess. An alternative is to offer symmetry with restrictions. Players in Wizard's Quest and Catan have the same number of territories, but choose them in alternating order; the differing combination of territories causes asymmetry.

Symmetry can be undone by human psychology; the advantage of players wearing red over players wearing blue is a well-documented example of this.

=== Systems and subsystems ===
In general, games can be viewed as systems of numbers and relations that typically consist of multiple subsystems. All numbers within a game only have a meaning in their given context. Subsystems can be dealt with separately and they might even have different balancing goals, but they also influence each other more or less. It is therefore crucial to consider how changes can affect the balance as a whole.

=== Transitivity and intransitivity ===
(In-)transitivity is a term used for logical relations. In games, this usually refers to relations between game elements, e.g. between the element A, B and C: In case of transitivity given A beats B and B beats C, A beats C. This means that A is the best element of those three. A transitive relation is especially useful as rewards for the player to receive more and more useful game elements.

In case of intransitivity given A beats B and B beats C, A does not automatically beat C. On the contrary, it might even be the case that C beats A, like in rock-paper-scissors. Intransitive relations can be assessed within the properties of game elements instead of just defining the outcome. This helps to create variety and prevent dominant strategies.

== Balancing process ==
Balancing always includes changing quantifiable values and relations between them, directly or indirectly; this is done as an iterative process and partially dependent on the genre, during development and also afterwards (e.g. by rule changes, addons or software-updates). However, it cannot be completely solved by algorithms since aesthetics are also important and a perfect balance might actually achieve the opposite of fun. Ideally, simple rules deliver complex results. This is also referred to as “emergence”.

Extremely powerful game elements and dominant strategies are dangerous to the latter goal and should therefore be identified and corrected. Game elements that provide a highly situational use but have a fixed cost value, that is comparable to less situational elements, are particularly difficult to balance. Another priority is providing multiple viable options. Generally, players react better to buffing something than nerfing it. It is possible, however, to achieve those indirectly by changing another part of the system, since most content, if not everything is connected and related to each other.

=== Goals of balancing ===
The highest goal of balancing is always preserving or increasing the fun or engagement. This, however, can highly depend on the individual game and its audience and might even consist in great imbalance or turn into the opposite of fun: Especially in games with in game purchases or in-game advertising, the developer or publisher has an interest to monetize the game, even if it is detrimental to the fun. Such games may frequently interrupt the experience with advertisements or provide low chances (e.g. in loot boxes) to intentionally frustrate the player but keep engagement high to encourage spending money to skip frustrating parts. Otherwise, the player may face huge disadvantages (imbalances) even against other paying players.

In general, though, there is a consensus that huge imbalances are bad for a game, even if the game still is fun to play – a better balance would make it even more fun. Opinions on exactly what should be balanced, how well-balanced a game should ideally be and even if perfect balance is achievable or even a good thing vary. In some cases, it is even stated that a slight imbalance is actually beneficial.

A crucial goal of balancing a is preventing any of its component systems from being ineffective or otherwise undesirable when compared to their peers. An unbalanced system represents wasted development resources at the very least, and at worst can undermine the game's entire ruleset by making important roles or tasks impossible to perform.

One balancing approach is to set strategies as the goal, so all offered strategies have roughly equal chances of success. Strategies can only be affected by changing underlying game elements, but the balance between game elements is not the focus here. Strategies should offer a deep gaming experience.

The balance can depend on player skill. Therefore, one level of skill should be chosen as the goal of all development efforts. This might be professional or casual players, for example. On all other levels, that do not fit the prime audience, more imbalances can be accepted.

Preserving strategies and game elements from becoming irrelevant also is emphasized: Every given option should have at least some use and should be viable. To achieve this, strategies and game elements should be compared within all contexts they compete in, e.g. combat or resource investments. Extremely powerful (“broken”) strategies and elements are viewed as especially damaging since they devalue all their competitors.

Beyond all of that, there is an argument for some imbalances within a game, since that constantly encourages players to find new solution, e.g. by interacting in the metagame. This especially applies to frequently updated games. On the opposite end, (nearly) perfectly balanced games would result in mere execution of proven strategies, with only top players being able to create new successful strategies. Also, giving all game elements the exact same amount of power would make all decisions meaningless, since everything is equally powerful anyway.

Another approach emphasizes that balance between game elements, strategies and actions is not the most important factor, but providing counters against any situation that may arise. This always allows players to find them together and they never face unsolvable problems.

At least, there is the idea to include players in the balancing regarding their skills and other prerequisites. Matchmaking and handicaps can help achieving that. This might also decrease the influence of imbalance since players are more equally matched. In addition to that, the players’ perception of balance should be considered: Player behavior can affect success rates of strategies and game elements. Therefore, all changes should be communicated accordingly.

=== Characteristics of a well-balanced game ===
Despite not all goals of balancing are clear, many characteristics of well-balanced games are usually not disagreed on: Decisions should be meaningful. The player should still have a chance to win in most situations and no stalemates should arise, in which nobody can win or lose. Leading player or computer controlled opponents should never get an irretrievable advantage until they almost won. Early mistakes and chance should not make a game unwinnable. Also, the game should provide the player with enough information and control to avoid those errors, so the player always feels responsible for his or her actions.

Measuring the state of balance is another matter though, since it requires interpretation of data. Sheer win rates of strategies or game elements do not have a great significance without considering other factors like player skill and pick rates. Making correct conclusions is therefore crucial to find causes for imbalance.

== Methods and tools ==
The following paragraphs present a collection of tools and methods used to balance a game or to measure its state. Not mathematical perfection, but fun, engagement or a mix of both is the main goal and human evaluation still is the only known measurement for successfully achieving those, especially fun. Also, balancing is an intricate process and typically needs many iterations.

=== Aesthetics and narration ===
The visual impression of a game should not contradict with its balancing. On the contrary: Especially real models, e.g. historic facts, can serve as inspiration for mechanics, counters, orthogonal unit differences or intransitive relations.

=== Balancing strategies ===
One approach is to move the balancing goal to strategies instead of game elements. Strategies typically include multiple elements and decisions. This makes sure that all game elements have at least some use and decisions stay meaningful. Also, seemingly fine game elements might become too powerful only in certain combinations. A difficulty of this is though that strategies can only be influenced by changing the game elements and mechanics they include.

=== Ban ===
Banning certain game elements or strategies is a way to remove dominant strategies from otherwise well-balanced games, especially in the competitive sector. This should be avoided when possible, however.

=== Central resource ===
A chosen value, this may be an attribute of a game elements, costs or an additionally calculated value like power, can be nominated as a benchmark for all other values. Every change of one of them means another one must change as well. It can affect the central resource but also any other value to still fit the same budget.

=== Counter ===
There should be a counter to every action, game element strategy that beats those in a direct competition. This does not only make dominant strategies unlikelier to develop, it also allows players to find new solutions for current challenges. Ideally, a counter relation is assessed within properties of game elements rather than simply defined. Also, decisions that are made at the beginning of a game that cannot be revised by the player should not determine the outcome right away.

=== Difficulty level ===
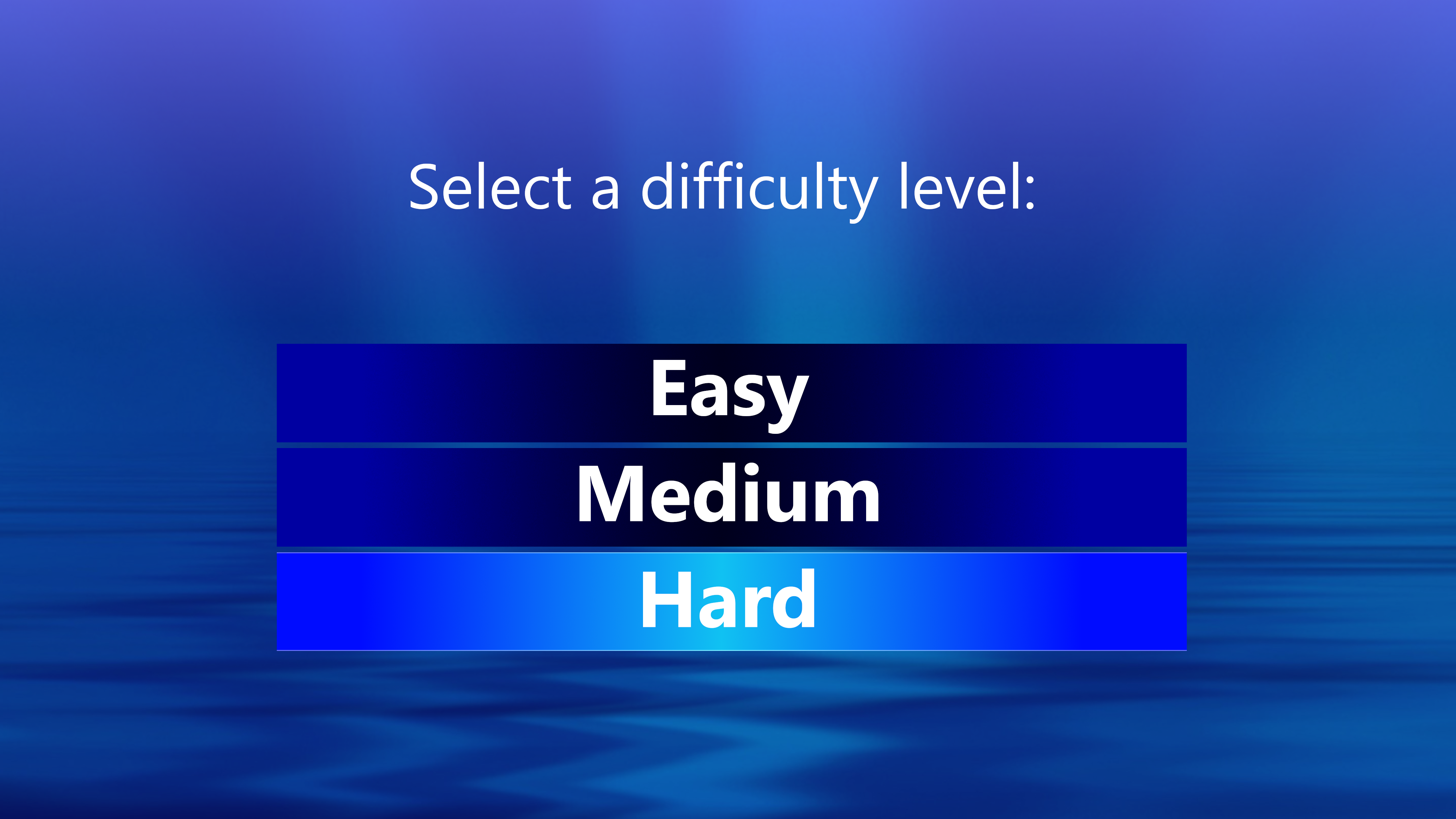
Some games offer the player a choice of difficulty level before play begins.

Video games often allow players to influence their balance by offering a choice of "difficulty levels". These affect how challenging the game is to play, and usually run on a general scale of "easy", "medium", and "hard". Sometimes, the difficulty is set once for the entirety of a game, while in other games it can be changed freely at any point. Modern games, e.g. Horizon Zero Dawn, may also feature a difficulty setting called “Story” for players who want to focus on the narrative rather than interactive parts like combat. There are also other terms. The Last of Us, for example, offers two settings above “hard”, called “survivor” and “grounded”.

In addition to altering the game's rules, difficulty levels can be used to alter what content is presented to the player. This usually takes the form of adding or removing challenging locations or events, but some games also change their narrative to reward players who play them on higher difficulty levels or end early as punishment for playing on easy. Difficulty selection is not always presented bluntly, particularly in competitive games where all players are affected equally, and the standard "easy/hard" terminology no longer applies. Sometimes veiled language is used (Mario Kart offers "CC select"), while at other times there may be an array of granular settings instead of an overarching difficulty option. An alternative approach to difficulty levels is catering to players of all abilities at the same time, a technique that has been called "subjective difficulty". This requires a game to provide multiple solutions or routes, each offering challenges appropriate to players of a certain skill level (Super Mario Galaxy, Sonic Generations).

=== Feedback ===
While tester feedback is important when developing and updating a game, there are certain things to be kept in mind: skill and the ability to explain do not necessarily correlate with each other. There are typically more players than developers, so they are better at solving it. Additionally, new testers should be added from time to time since practice effects emerge.

=== Gamemaster ===
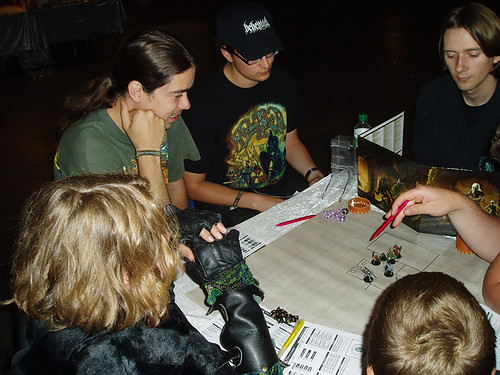
A game being moderated by a human gamemaster (right)

A game can be balanced dynamically by a gamemaster who observes players and adjusts the game in response to their actions, emotional state, etc., or even proactively changes the direction of the game to create certain experiences.

Although gamemasters have historically been humans, some videogames now feature artificial intelligence (AI) systems that perform a similar role by monitoring player ability and inferring emotional state from input. Such systems are often referred to as having dynamic difficulty. One notable example is Left 4 Dead and its sequel Left 4 Dead 2, cooperative games that have the players fight through hordes of zombie-like creatures including unique creatures with special abilities. Both games use an AI Director which not only generates random events but tries to create tension and fear by spawning in creatures to specific rule sets based on how players are progressing, specifically penalizing players through more difficult challenges for not working together. Research into biofeedback peripherals is set to greatly improve the accuracy of such systems.

=== Game theory ===
Game theory focuses more on theoretical modeling of competing players and their decision making and therefore is only for limited use in game design. However, it does offer knowledge and tools like a Net Payoff Matrix that can be helpful to measure power and understand player reasoning.

=== Handicaps ===
Handicaps may create a competitive situation between players of different skill level, but they might also go too far and render skill irrelevant. Handicaps are disadvantages that sometimes are deliberately self-inflicted.

=== Intuition ===
Games can be complex systems. Since development resources are limited, relying on intuition can sometimes be useful or even necessary. The designer should always keep in mind how changes affect other parts of the game and guesses should always rely on evidence or proof.

=== Matchmaking and ranking ===
An approach to avoid some balancing problems all together is ranking players depending on their skill. Ideally, the ranking system predicts the outcome almost perfectly and every player (in a PvP game) has roughly the same win rate, even considering factors that lie outside the game, like the gaming device. In any case, good match making benefits a game greatly, since, for example, newbies are not matched against experienced players who leave them with no chance of winning and the challenge of stronger opponents rises together with each player's skills.

=== Observation ===
Some obvious problems become clear through sheer observation of the game and player behavior. This includes mathematical superiority of game elements or strategies but also extremely high or low usage of those. In any case, statistics do not necessarily represent causalities and that there are typically multiple factors.

=== Orthogonal unit differences ===
Orthogonal unit differences describes properties of game elements that cannot be compared by inherent numbers. Ideally, every game element has at least one unique trait. This also helps creating intransitivity and counters.

=== Pacing ===
Player versus environment games are usually balanced to tread the fine line of regularly challenging players' abilities without ever producing insurmountable or unfair obstacles. This turns balancing into the management of dramatic structure, generally referred to by game designers as "pacing". Pacing is also a consideration in competitive games, but the autonomy of players makes it harder to control.

=== Power curve ===
A power curve (also: cost curve) is a relation that reflects the ratio between power and costs. It is especially useful when dealing with multiple game elements that provide varying benefits depending on different values of the same cost, e.g. when using a central resource. While a power curve always shows an order, it does not necessarily represent exact relations, depending on the level of measurement.

=== Randomization ===
Randomization of starting conditions is a technique common in board games, card games, and also experimental research, which fights back against the human tendency to optimize patterns in one's favor.

The downside of randomization is that it takes control away from the player, potentially leading to frustration. Methods of overcoming this include giving the player a selection of random results within which they can optimize (Scrabble, Magic: The Gathering) and making each game session short enough to encourage multiple attempts in one play session (Klondike, Strange Adventures in Infinite Space).

=== Statistical analysis ===
Statistics can help collecting empiric data of player behavior, success rates, etc., to identify unbalanced areas and make corrections. Ideally, a game gathers this data automatically. Statistics can only support a designers‘ abilities and intuition and are therefore only one part of making design decisions, together with, for example, tester- or user feedback. Statistics and their interpretation should also consider factors like skill and pick-rates.

=== Tier list ===
A tier list orders game elements according to their power in multiple categories. This ranking can be achieved using feedback, empiric data or subjective impressions. While the number and names of tiers can vary, a list typically goes from “god tier” through multiple tiers in between to “garbage tier”. While balancing, all elements within the god tier should be nerfed first. Too powerful elements make many other elements worse if not useless. After this, all elements within the garbage tier should be buffed until they are no longer useless. In the end, the power differences between all other tiers can be adjusted until a satisfying state is reached. A tier list is especially useful when working with game elements that have exactly the same cost, e.g. characters in a Fighting game.

== See also ==
- Triangular number#Applications
