= Titan Strike! =

Science fiction board wargame

Titan Strike!, subtitled "Battle for the Moon of Saturn," is a science fiction board wargame published by Simulations Publications, Inc. (SPI) in 1979 that is set on Titan, one of Saturn's moons.

== Description ==
Titan Strike! is a two-player game that simulates the battle for valuable solar fissionables mined on Titan. Each player controls either the European Economic Community or the Hegemony of Eastern Asia.

The game offers several scenarios. Turns are divided into phases: Electronic Warfare, Sky Combat, Skydive, Anti-sky, Ranged Combat, Land Movement, and Close Combat. Whichever player gains the most victory points by the end of the scenario is the winner.

== Publication history ==
Metagaming Concepts dominated the microgame market in the late 1970s with small, fast and cheap games packaged in Ziplock bags like O.G.R.E. and G.E.V. SPI was the first game company to mount a serious challenge to Metagaming, entering the microgame market in 1979 with six games packaged in ziplock bags: two "Fantasy Capsule" games (Demons and Deathmaze), and four science fiction "Space Capsule" games: The Creature That Ate Sheboygan, Stargate, Vector 3, and Titan Strike!, a microgame designed by Phil Kosnett, with artwork by Rick Bryant, Redmond A. Simonsen, and Charles Vess.

As soon as Titan Strike! was released in early 1979, it sold very well, and appeared on SPI's Top Ten Bestsellers list for over a year.

== Reception ==
In Issue 49 of Moves (February–March 1980), Eric Goldberg disparaged this game as the "low point" in the SPI Capsule Games line, calling it "a World War II battle system in space."

In the March 1980 edition of Dragon, Van Norton admired the simplicity of the rules, and found the board of Titan Strike! to be "impressive. It is easy to use and has five types of terrain... clear, dry, sea, ammonia sea, mesa, and mesa cavern. All terrains have an effect on combat and movement." One of the problems with the game was the provided charts, which Norton found to be confusing. "But don't let that stop you from buying this interesting 'pocket game.' It is fun, and can be played in an hour."

In the October 1980 issue of Fantastic, game designer Greg Costikyan (whose The Creature That Ate Sheboygan game itself was part of SPI's six microgame debut) wrote "Despite some interesting electronic counter-measure rules, Titan Strike! is little more than a modern land-combat game transported into space; disappointing."

In the November 1980 issue of The Space Gamer (Issue No. 33), Patrick Reyes found that "Titan Strike makes for a fast-paced and exciting game of tactical warfare in an alien environment. The novice player might have a little trouble with Titan Strike [...] but I think the intermediate gamer will find it an interesting change of pace."

In Issue 26 of Simulacrum. Brian Train called this "a fun introductory game ... This little game seems to have everything that I love about the hex and counter wargaming genre. Interesting units and chrome that add to the simulation value and enhance the theme. This game also avoids the wargaming pitfalls: long play time, tons of fiddly counters and long downtime in-between moves. In all, it’s an excellent introduction to this type of game."
