= Tomorrow's Heritage =

Novel by Juanita Coulson

Tomorrow's Heritage is a novel by Juanita Coulson published in 1981.

== Plot summary ==
Tomorrow's Heritage is a novel in which the members of a family each pursue different goals as an alien probe arrives in their system.

== Reception ==
Greg Costikyan reviewed Tomorrow's Heritage in Ares Magazine #12 and commented that "Tomorrow's Heritage is good popcorn, but one expects more from Coulson. Also, it is increasingly disturbing to find that people who choose to write on political themes tend to have no discernable political opinions whatsoever, nary so much as a belief in democracy."

== Reviews ==
- Review by Baird Searles (1981) in Isaac Asimov's Science Fiction Magazine, December 21, 1981
- Review by Tom Easton (1982) in Analog Science Fiction/Science Fact, May 1982
- Review by Joe Sanders (1982) in Starship, November 1982
