= Esbae: A Winter's Tale =

1981 novel by Linda Haldeman

Esbae: A Winter's Tale is a novel by Linda Haldeman published in 1981.

== Plot summary ==
Esbae: A Winter's Tale is a novel in which college student Chuck summons a demon named Asmodeus.

== Reception ==
Greg Costikyan reviewed Esbae: A Winter's Tale in Ares Magazine #13 and commented that "The premise of the novel may sound silly, but Haldeman handles it well. Esbae is permeated with a vision of college life that seems like something from a better, bygone era: professors puffing contentedly on pipes, enthusiastic student choirs, red-cheeked students frolicking in the snow."

== Reviews ==
- Review by Faren Miller (1981) in Locus, #250 November 1981
- Review by Ann Collier (1982) in Vector 107
- Review by Barry N. Malzberg (1982) in The Magazine of Fantasy & Science Fiction, June 1982
