= Mooncrow =

Fiction novel

Mooncrow is a novel by Jack Massa published in 1979.

== Plot summary ==
Mooncrow is a novel about Mooncrow, a bird-adept who leaves his school of magicians to travel to the south.

== Reception ==
Greg Costikyan reviewed Mooncrow in Ares Magazine #2 and commented that "the few effective sequences in the book occur in the magicians' citadel. So he destroys the Empire and gets the girl. Ho hum; all in a day's work."
