= The Light-Bearer =

1980 novel

First edition (published by Berkley Books). Cover art by Richard Courtney

The Light-Bearer is a novel by Sam Nicholson published in 1980.

== Plot summary ==
The Light-Bearer is a novel in which Prince Zeid seeks to aid the Terrans who are helping the natives of his planet modernize.

== Reception ==
Greg Costikyan reviewed The Light-Bearer in Ares Magazine #5 and commented that "The Light Bearer is light sf/fantasy adventure, and very cleanly written; it reminds one of nothing so much as Sprague DeCamp's Krishna series."

== Reviews ==
- Review by Douglas E. Winter (1980) in Fantasy Newsletter, No. 28 September 1980
- Review by Tom Easton (1980) in Analog Science Fiction/Science Fact, November 1980
