= Wormy =

Wormy may refer to:

- Wormy (comic strip), a comic strip by David A. Trampier that appeared in Dragon magazine
- "Wormy", an episode of season 2 of SpongeBob SquarePants
- Wormy, a character from the comic book Owly by Andy Runton
- Wormy, a character from the movie The Sin of Harold Diddlebock played by Jimmy Conlin
- Wormy Marrons, a 1940s Dick Tracy villain
- Uncle Wormy, an imaginary friend in the cartoon series Arthur
