= Vector 3 =

Vector 3 is a science fiction combat microgame published by Simulations Publications, Inc. (SPI) in 1979.

== Description ==
Vector 3 is a tactical space combat game involving two warring civilizations of the heavily populated Gilgamesh Cluster. The game includes four scenarios. Before combat begins, each player must design their spaceships, using a point-buy system to purchase various weapons, defenses and other systems.

=== Components ===
The 6 in × 9 in (150 mm × 230 mm) ziplock bag contains:

- folded colour sheet with front cover title/art and back cover text
- two 17 in × 11 in (430 mm × 280 mm) square grid paper maps (X-Y and X-Z)
- 100 die-cut counters
- rule sheet
- sheet of game aids

=== Movement ===
Ship movement uses Newtonian mechanics and is tracked in three dimensions, simultaneously using separate X-Y and X-Z charts.

=== Victory conditions ===
Players receive Victory Points for destroying system pods and ships. The game ends when the last ship on one side is either destroyed or disengages from battle and leaves the map. At that point, the player with the most Victory Points is the winner.

== Publication history ==
Metagaming Concepts dominated the microgame market in the 1970s with games like O.G.R.E. and G.E.V. SPI was the first game company to mount a serious challenge to Metagaming, entering the microgame market in 1979 with six games packaged in ziplock bags: two "Fantasy Capsule" games (Demons and Deathmaze), and four science fiction "Space Capsule" games: The Creature That Ate Sheboygan, Stargate, Titan Strike!, and Vector 3, a microgame designed by Greg Costikyan, with artwork by Rick Bryant, Redmond A. Simonsen, and Charles Vess.

After the demise of SPI, rights to the game became a Creative Commons Attribution-NonCommercial licence.

== Reception ==
In Issue 21 of Phoenix, Paul King thought that in some respects, SPI had outdone Metagaming, with more colorful counters, and well-written rules that enabled players to begin play within 10 minutes. He also noted that "Once started, the action in fast and furious." King believed the point-buy system for designing ships was one of the high points of the game. He concluded with a strong recommendation, saying, "For the science fiction buff, the game is a must. For the gamer who fancies something different, it is worth having — the only limiting factor is your imagination."

In Issue 29 of The Space Gamer, Ronald Pehr was not impressed with the game, saying, "In short, the game is too busy. Once you've played a game of Vector 3 you find yourself in no hurry to play again.".

In Issue 27 of Simulacrum, Brian Train noted, "It's all very involved, even for only four pages of rules, and an example of something that would be much better received today as a computer game. Even though I know my squares and square roots, it’s not something I would spend time on today."

== Other reviews ==
- American Wargamer, Vol. 6 #10
- American Wargamer, Vol. 7 #1
