= Your Own Private Idaho (The Price of Freedom) =

Your Own Private Idaho is a 1987 role-playing game adventure published by West End Games for The Price of Freedom.

== Plot summary ==
Your Own Private Idaho is an adventure in which a conflict is depicted between the American resistance fighters in the "First Idaho Brigade" and Soviet veteran troops that came from Afghanistan. It comes with a map of the Mackay Dam area, a folder of charts and tables, and new rules for antiaircraft weaponry and helicopters.

== Publication history ==
Your Own Private Idaho was written by Steve Gilbert with Greg Costikyan and published by West End Games in 1987 as a 32-page book with a map and an outer folder.
