= Swordquest (disambiguation) =

Swordquest is an unfinished series of video games produced by Atari, Inc. in the 1980s.

Swordquest or Sword Quest may also refer to:

- Swordquest (board game), a 1979 board game published by Task Force Games
- Swordquest, an episode of Angry Video Game Nerd covering the unfinished series
- Sword Quest, a 2008 children's novel by Nancy Yi Fan
- Sword Quest - a Dungeons and Dragons style game for the MicroBee
