= David A. Trampier =

American artist (1954–2014)

- David A. Trampier from The Daily Egyptian, 2002
- Born: April 22, 1954 St. Louis, Missouri, U.S.
- Died: March 24, 2014 (aged 59) Carbondale, Illinois, U.S.
- Pseudonyms: Tramp, DAT
- Notable works: Wormy; Player's Handbook; Monster Manual; Titan

David A. Trampier (April 22, 1954 – March 24, 2014) was an artist and writer who illustrated some of the earliest editions of the Dungeons & Dragons role-playing game for TSR, Inc. Many of his illustrations, such as the cover of the original Player's Handbook, became iconic. Trampier was also the creator of the Wormy comic strip that ran in Dragon magazine for several years.

At the height of his career in the late 1980s, Trampier suddenly withdrew from the gaming world for unknown reasons. For many years, Trampier's location was unknown to anyone and rumors circulated that he had died; his brother-in-law Tom Wham denied this, although Wham admitted that even he did not know where Trampier was or what he was doing.

Trampier was inducted into the AAGAD (tabletop gaming) Hall of Fame posthumously in 2024 as part of the 50th anniversary of the HOF.

== Career ==
Cover of original AD&D Players Handbook, art by Trampier

In 1977, TSR, Inc. started to develop a new version of their popular Dungeons & Dragons role-playing game called Advanced Dungeons & Dragons (AD&D). Unlike TSR's previous rulebooks, which had been low-quality paperback booklets, the rulebooks for AD&D would be high-quality lithographed hard covers featuring full color wrap-around cover art and many interior black & white illustrations. The first book to be published was the Monster Manual in 1977, and Trampier, along with fellow artists David Sutherland and Tom Wham, provided artwork for the manual. Tim Kask, editor of Dragon magazine, stated in a review that the book's profuse illustrations were "outstanding", and that the illustrations "in themselves would warrant the cover price".

It was the next hardcover rulebook, the Player's Handbook, that would secure Trampier his reputation while he was still in his mid-twenties. Trampier's cover depicted a temple dominated by a huge, devilish statue being looted by a group of adventurers; the back cover included a representation of the book's author, Gary Gygax. The cover image became synonymous with the game until the cover art was replaced with a new illustration in 1982. Trampier also created several pieces of interior art for the Player's Handbook.

He continued to be an important contributor to the TSR brand in the company's early years. Some of his more notable works included:

- Cover art and some of the interior illustrations for Gamma World role-playing game (1978).
- Map board for the wargame Divine Right (1979).
- Cover art for the Dungeon Master's Screen (1979). [Winner of the Gamer's Choice Award for 1979]
- Cover art for the AD&D adventure The Village of Hommlet (1979)
- Interior art for the third and fourth hardcover rulebooks, Dungeon Masters Guide (1979) and Deities & Demigods (1980).
- Interior art for many AD&D adventures.

=== Wormy ===
The September 1977 issue of Dragon (Issue #9) featured a new 6-panel comic, Trampier's Wormy. The first frame featured the title character, a cigar-chomping, pool hustling, wargaming dragon, and subsequent issues revealed the cast of trolls and ogres who were his neighbors and friends. The stories were told from the point of view of the antagonists of the Dungeons & Dragons game; the wizards, warriors and other protagonists that players would be expected to portray were inevitably presented as unwelcome intruders. Wormy continued to appear in Dragon for the next 10 years, until Issue #132 (April 1988).

=== Titan ===
In 1980, Trampier and Jason McAllister co-designed a "monster slugathon" wargame called Titan, for which Trampier also executed the artwork. The purpose of the game was simply to defeat other players' armies, using the victories to advance in power until there was only one army left. Trampier and McAllister self-published the game through Gorgonstar Company. It was re-published by Avalon Hill in 1982 and gained a measure of popularity. Articles about Titan were featured in several issues of Avalon Hill's General magazine, and it remained in print until Avalon Hill's demise in 1998. In 2008, Valley Games printed a new edition of Titan without Trampier's artwork.

== Disappearance ==
In the late 1980s, David Trampier suddenly disappeared. The last installment of Wormy appeared in the April 1988 issue of Dragon (#132); despite the fact that the comic was in the middle of an unfinished storyline, no further Wormy comics were ever published. In the August 1988 issue of Dragon (issue #136), in response to a reader letter, the Dragon editors wrote, "We regret to announce that 'Wormy' will no longer be appearing in Dragon Magazine. We are looking into the possibility of adding another graphic series in the future."

Kim Mohan, then editor of Dragon, told Phil Foglio that payments for Wormy and other royalty payments sent to Trampier had been returned unopened. Foglio explained that "When an artist's checks are returned uncashed, he is presumed dead."

== Reappearance ==
Trampier was rediscovered by coincidence, working as a taxi driver. In February 2002, Arin Thompson did a night-shift ride along in Carbondale, Illinois with a local Yellow Taxi driver for an article for Southern Illinois University's student newspaper. The taxi driver was David Trampier, who told Thompson he had moved to Carbondale from Chicago about eight months previously. Thompson, who did not know of Trampier's work as an artist, published the story and Trampier's photograph in The Daily Egyptian on February 15, 2002.

Word circulated that Trampier was still alive; several companies and individuals contacted him to inquire about commissioning new artwork, republishing old artwork, or appearing at conventions. Trampier rebuffed all attempts to draw him back into the fantasy gaming world and continued to drive his taxi. One of the people who reached out to him was fellow cartoonist Jolly Blackburn, who simply wanted to talk to him about a Wormy compilation that had been done a few years prior. Blackburn reported that "He politely asked me not to call him again and to lose his number. Apparently a lot of people tracked him down through the same article and he was fed up with all the phone calls. Seemed like a nice guy. He just wants nothing to do with the strip or the gaming industry."

In 2003, Wizards of the Coast stated that Trampier was "alive and well" but "not currently working in gaming or comics". In 2004, Trampier's fellow artist and brother-in-law Tom Wham stated that he believed Trampier "still exists somewhere in Illinois".

In 2008, Trampier visited Castle Perilous Games & Books, a game store in Carbondale, to see the new edition of Titan that had been published by Valley Games. That was the only contact he made with the games community until several years later.

== Death ==
In late 2013, several misfortunes struck Trampier. He suffered a mild stroke, he lost his job when the Yellow Taxi Company went out of business, and he discovered that he had cancer. Needing money, Trampier contacted Scott Thorne, the owner of Castle Perilous Games & Books, and offered to sell eight of his original pieces of artwork, including the original cover art for the 1979 Dungeon Master's Screen. Thorne bought the artwork, and tried to convince Trampier to have his Wormy comics republished. Trampier was suspicious of the offer, and wanted to ensure that TSR would not have any part of the publication; he seemed surprised by the news that TSR had been taken over by Wizards of the Coast almost 20 years previously. Thorne suggested that Troll Lord Games might be a good publisher to approach.

Trampier accepted an invitation to display some of his original artwork at Egypt Wars, a local games convention; it would be his first public connection to fantasy gaming since his disappearance 25 years before. Representatives of Troll Lord Games were also scheduled to be at the convention, and Thorne hoped Trampier might talk to them about a publishing deal. However, Trampier suddenly died on March 24, 2014, three weeks before the convention.

== Influence ==
Rich Burlew (creator of The Order of the Stick) has voiced great respect for the place Wormy held as an early D&D comic strip, indicating in an interview that he felt awed at his comic being published on Dragon's back page, where Wormy once ran, adding that he felt he was "not worthy to shine Wormy's feet." In the last issue of Dragon magazine (#359, September 2007), Burlew included in his OOTS comic a number of references to comics that had appeared in the magazine over its long run, including a Wormy-like dragon (complete with hat and cigar) fleeing before Wizards of the Coast turned the dungeon electronic.

In 2014, Scott Taylor of Black Gate, named Dave Trampier as Honorable Mention in a list of The Top 10 RPG Artists of the Past 40 Years, saying "To me, there was no one in the early TSR art department with half the pure talent of Trampier, apologies to Dee, Willingham, Otus, Darlene, and the late Jim Roslof, but Trampier had a depth that none of the others ever managed." When he died in March of that year, Taylor said that "Trampier, for all his mystery, was the bridge, but now he is gone, and a chasm is forever left behind that no one can again traverse in hopes of finding visual adventures beyond our wildest dreams."
