= The Price of Freedom (role-playing game) =

1986 Cold War role-playing game

Cover art by Dave Henderson

The Price of Freedom, subtitled "Roleplaying in Occupied America", is a role-playing game published by West End Games (WEG) in 1986 that depicts the uneven struggle between Soviet occupiers and an American resistance movement.

== Description ==
The Price of Freedom is a near-future Cold War role-playing game set in the near-future a few years after Soviet forces have successfully taken over the United States and now rule with an iron fist as occupiers. Players take on the role of poorly equipped American resistance fighters. The Soviets have the advantage of military-grade weapons; the Americans must make do with "shotguns, pitchforks, and pickup trucks."

The combat with modern-day weaponry is quite detailed, although players can opt to use a simpler system. Skill resolution is considerably less complex, resolved by comparing a 20-sided die roll to the appropriate skill score.

=== Character generation ===
Each player starts with a pool of 50 points, and distributes them among the character's attributes (Strength, Intelligence, etc.) Likewise, the player distributes 150 points among various skills. (If a character performs particularly well during an adventure, the gamemaster has the discretion to increase an attribute or skill score.) Each player rounds out the character with:

- Physical Tag: a striking physical feature such as a visible tattoo or bald head.
- Personality Tag: The character's attitude, such as Proud, or Religious.
- Passion: Something of obsessive importance to the character.

== Publication history ==
The Price of Freedom was designed by Greg Costikyan, and was published by West End Games in 1986. A Gamemaster Pack and the adventure Your Own Private Idaho were published the following year.

Created as the Cold War drew to an end in the era of glasnost and thawing US-Soviet relations, the game failed to find an audience and rapidly went out of print. In an interview 30 years after the game's publication, Costikyan said "My political views are not those of The Price of Freedom; at the time, I considered myself a 'left libertarian'. […] Some of my more liberal friends were intrigued by the [game's] idea, but repulsed by the heavy-handed nature of its political message […] But in general, you know, it was a flop. We had quite a lot of interest from the distributors pre-publication, but in the event, it did not sell particularly well. Keep in mind that this was the Gorbachev era, US-Soviet relations were improving, and the [game's] scenario was viewed as pretty implausible." Costikyan admitted that he was "A tad embarrassed by the game."

== Reception ==
In Issue 86 of White Dwarf, Ashley Shepherd stated "I have the feeling that Price is intended to be taken as a tongue-in-cheek game. At least, I hope it is..."

Two articles in French games magazines (Casus Belli and Chroniques d'Outre-Monde) did not see any humor in the game, and noted the stridently pro-American slant, pointing out that only American resistants have Hero Points, and only Soviets and collaborationists endure Panic.

Stewart Wieck reviewed The Price of Freedom in White Wolf #7 (1987), rating it an 8 out of 10 and stated that "Even if you are an RPGer who already has established campaigns in several game systems, then you should still think about looking into TPF. It's a game that is well thought out, well presented, AND enjoyable."

In his 1990 book The Complete Guide to Role-Playing Games, game critic Rick Swan thought The Price of Freedom was a satirical masterpiece, at least as funny as WEG's humorous role-playing games Ghostbusters and Paranoia. Swan called the packaging "gorgeous", the premise "outrageous' and the execution of the game "brilliant, flawed only be a narrow approach that limits its long-term playability." Swan concluded by giving the game an excellent rating of 3.5 out of 4, saying, "Inexplicably Price of Freedom never caught on — maybe the satire was a little too subtle, or maybe the humor was a little too black — but it's nevertheless a classic, one that deserves a closer look from those who may have missed it the first time around."

Simon Washbourne reviewed The Price of Freedom for Arcane magazine and stated that "The Price of Freedom is perhaps all that much more acceptable now, given the end of the Cold War and the warming relations between East and West. Indeed, if it were to be released again now I'm sure it would be seen as nothing more than fantasy. But remember, the Berlin Wall was still standing in 1986, and there was still the very real threat of nuclear conflagration. But how would people feel about a game in which the participants played the roles of IRA sympathisers? Or Columbian [sic] drug barons? Or Nazi concentration camp soldiers? Makes you think about the boundaries between fantasy and reality, and just how far game designers are willing to go. I suggest they'd go a lot further than many of us would give them credit for."

== See also ==
- Red Dawn, a 1984 film about the USSR invading and occupying the US
