= MadMaze =

MadMaze is an online video game designed by Eric Goldberg and developed by Greg Costikyan in 1989. It was the first online game to draw over a million players, and was playable through the Prodigy service. The game disappeared in 1999 with the death of the Prodigy service, but with the permission from the service and the creators, fans of the game have rehosted it.

== Gameplay ==
Gameplay is fairly simple - the game is based around two dimensional mazes, which the player often has to map out in order to progress. Completion of a maze is rewarded by an interactive scene with some character or location in the world of the maze. The interactive scenes between the different mazes are known as "Places of Power."

Choosing the right option allows the player to gain some hints for solving other puzzles in the maze, or to progress further. Many interactive scenes feature multiple possible solutions, only some of which will reward the player with clues. Most scenes can be repeated to achieve a successful outcome, and some scenes result in death, requiring the player to restart. "Saving" your game was done by means of entering a poem at the opening screen of the game, which worked as a password to transport the player to a certain part of the game.

The mazes started out as extremely simple, but continually grew in complexity until most could not be solved by trial and error. The walls in the mazes were all at 90 degrees, and involved simple commands in any of the four directions to progress, with the player always facing in the direction of the last place he moved. One of the later mazes also featured invisible walls so that the player had to identify whether he was making progress or not by text in the game.

The graphics were fairly simple, the maze backgrounds used only a few images which varied in color schemes, conversations took place over text, and simple 2D pixelated images provided backgrounds for some of the interactive scenes.

== Plot ==
The basic plot of the game was that the player had to fulfill the task of a runner, by venturing into the Mad One's Maze and enlist the help of a wizard at the lowest level. The maze had three levels total, and different levels had their own set of characters, related puzzles, and storyline.

=== Introduction ===
The player takes on the role of a boy from the rural community of Weith Village. Wellan, the Village Elder, explains to the player that The Mad One has returned, and his influence continues to grow stronger over Weith Village; with the MadMaze threatening to engulf the village. The player is tasked by Wellan to travel to the center of the MadMaze and recruit the help of a wizard named Moraziel, on the pretext that only with his help can the Mad One be defeated.
