= Price of Freedom Gamemaster Pack =

Price of Freedom Gamemaster Pack is a 1987 role-playing game supplement published by West End Games for The Price of Freedom.

== Contents ==
Price of Freedom Gamemaster Pack is a supplement in which a gamemaster's screen includes additional aids such as a color battle map and rules to generating encounters involving Soviet Occupation troops.

== Publication history ==
Price of Freedom Gamemaster Pack was written by Paul Murphy, et al., and published by West End Games in 1987 as a cardstock screen, a 16-page booklet, and a color map.
