= The Mad Magazine Game =

Board game

The Mad Magazine Game, later reissued as Mad Magazine: The "What-Me Worry?" game, is a board game produced by Parker Brothers in 1979. Gameplay is similar, but the goals and directions often opposite, to that of Monopoly; the object is for players to lose all their money. The first player is determined by a left-handed roll for the lowest number, and play proceeds to the right. The game includes cards, money, dice, and tokens, and the game board features Alfred E. Neuman and illustrations from Mad magazine. By design, no conclusive strategy exists for the game, since even if a player is winning, several spaces and cards direct players to exchange money or chairs with others, causing advantages to be lost instantly.

== Description ==
The game board includes illustrations of characters from Mad including Spy vs. Spy, Alfred E. Neuman and characters taken from strips drawn by Mad artists including Don Martin and Dave Berg, with an original color illustration by Jack Davis on the cover.

== Rules and gameplay ==
To begin the game, after placing all tokens on Start and determining the first player, one player is selected to be the Banker ("preferably someone honest"), who gives $10,000 to each person. The dice may only be rolled with the left hand; a player using their right hand is penalized by receiving $500 from each other player. Also, tokens move counterclockwise around the outside track. A player who moves clockwise is informed that he or she is a nerd person and may never play the game again. The board contains two "inside track" sections, which are entered by landing on one of the double-arrow spaces leading onto them. A player who does so immediately takes another turn by rolling one die; while on an inside track, players may only roll one die.

The cards and spaces bear a variety of bizarre directions, such as trading places or money with a particular opponent, winning or losing money based on what the other players are doing, or losing money by performing a comical stunt. If any dispute or ambiguity arise concerning the directions, it are resolved by majority vote; in addition, if any questions come up concerning what constitutes a majority, the rules allow for them to be settled by majority vote. A player who lands on the "Tough Luck" space must take all the money accumulated there.

The winner is the first player to lose all their money.

== "Card cards" ==
The game includes 24 "Card cards" printed with various instructions. Examples:

- Change chairs with anyone.
- Change money with anyone.
- Flip this card in the air. If it lands with this side face up, you lose $1000. If not, go to 'Tough Luck'
- If you are good looking, stand up and imitate your favorite animal, and lose $2000.
- If you can jump up and stay airborne for 37 seconds, you can lose $5000. If not, jump up and lose $500.
- If you like this game, cross your legs, sit on your hands, cackle like a chicken and lose 1 egg; also $500.
- Plan ahead and move to any space on the board.
- Put this card on top of your head and walk around the table backwards. If it doesn't fall off before you sit down you lose $1000.
- Stand up and boo the person on your left. Also lose $1000.
- Take the next card, don't peek, and give it to anyone else.
- This card can only be played on Friday (no other instructions are given on the card).
- You are a rock. Act like one. If you're good, you lose $1000. If you're not so good, you win a rock.

== Spaces ==
Instructions on the board's 60 spaces include:

- Start: Whenever you pass or land here, lose $500.
- If no one is standing you lose $1000. If someone is standing you win $2000.
- Must gamble everything you have. Roll dice: Odd - win twice as much; Even - lose everything, but collect $1500.
- Lose your turn or go ahead 27 (if your name is Alfred E. Neuman, forget it).
- If there is an opponent with elbows on the table lose $2000. If not, lose $4000.
- Tough Luck (If anything is under here, you gotta take it).
- Everyone moves one chair to the right.
- Everyone moves one chair to the left.
- Old Maid (Stay right here until someone rolls a one or seven).
- If someone is smiling go back 3 spaces. If no one is smiling go ahead three spaces.
- Wait right here for another player to pass you…and then move with him or her.
- Exchange money with the person on your right.
- Change money with the person on your left.
- Anywhere (Roll 7, collect $500 and go to start. if you don't; just go to start).
- The $1,329,063 bill included in the game for the Alfred E. Neuman space
  If your name is Alfred E. Neuman collect $1,329,063. If not, lose a turn.
- Everyone else moves 1 space back and does what it says.
- Go to Toledo, Ohio. If the bus has already left, stay where you are and pay $500 for train tickets.
- If you are "magnificent" go to Anywhere.

== Bills and game pieces ==
- 1 game board
- 4 player tokens (red, green, yellow, blue)
- 2 dice
- 24 cards
- 15 $500 bills
- 20 $1000 bills
- 10 $5000 bills
- 1 $1,329,063 bill

== Development and release ==
The staff of Mad Magazine collaborated on the game's development.

Parker Brothers announced its plans to publish The Mad Magazine Game at the 1979 annual American Toy Fair in New York, to be advertised on the inside front cover of Mad magazine's October issue. The game was published in 1979. Mad magazine reported that "A popular game upon introduction, it even outsold Monopoly for a time".

Parker Brothers relaunched the game in 1988 in a slightly larger box, as the What-Me Worry? game, with the Mad logo prominently on the box.

== Reception ==
David Ahl for Creative Computing called The Mad Magazine Game "zany fun which pokes fun at traditional board games. It breaks all the rules as players move counter-clockwise on the board in an attempt to win the game by losing all their money."

Joe Brancatelli from Creepy described The Mad Magazine Game as "a pretty fair translation of the magazine".

The Winchester Star reviewed The Mad Magazine Game and noted that "This daffy board game scored a 'go-directly-to-store-and-get one' rating from our team" and that "one of the instructions tells you to move anywhere if you are magnificent. Who could resist? All egotists from age eight to adult are invited to try it."

The editors of Consumer Reports published a survey in the December 1981 issue showing the favorite board games of 1,278 8 to 12 year-olds, with The Mad Magazine Game coming in third behind Monopoly and Life.

The editors of ""Board Games Kids Like Best" reported that 70% of children who filled out a questionnaire in 1982 liked The Mad Magazine Game.

Gary Gygax considered the idea of a player adding rules from The Mad Magazine Game to Monopoly, asking if "any intelligent person" would "imagine it to be somehow 'better' than either one alone, and then announce to everyone far and wide that the end product was not only superior, but it was still a Monopoly game?" Gygax considered that "ludicrous" even when "well-meaning players [...] try to mix and match different systems".

Dan Wascoe Jr. for the Star Tribune said "Tired of reality? Try games and toys based on fantasy. The re-launched MAD Magazine game requires players to move counterclockwise and lose all their money to win. Further heresy: Although the game is new, the box says, 'Not New OR Improved.'" The article notes:

Bruce Whitehill in the book Games: American Boxed Games and Their Makers, 1822–1992, with Values described the game as "Common, but liable to increase in value more than games from the same period."

David Baity for The Charlotte Observer noted that he and his guests "launched into a round of play with the Mad Magazine game. It's a zany contest that contrasts markedly with Monopoly. In Monopoly, you try to amass property, wealth and power. To win the Mad game, you have to get rid of all your money. Sometimes divesting yourself of funds requires making animal sounds, balancing a card on your head and walking backward around the playing table and doing other zany stuff. Each performance was greeted by a burst of laughter."

Jamie Keshet for Fun and Games in Stepfamily Therapy wrote that "It has very unusual directions [...] Winning and losing in this game is unpredictable and it is a good measure of flexibility in a family. It also appeals to oppositional young clients."

Randall Lane in the book P.O.V. Living Large: The Guy’s Guide to Getting Ahead, Getting It Right, and Getting by with Style described the game as "deeply stupid" and "infesting the garage sales of America", declaring that the game "announces that you've embraced your inner Alfred E. Neuman — and should remain in the closet until you are both very, very drunk."

Katie Salen and Eric Zimmerman in their book Rules of Play: Game Design Fundamentals explore the dynamics of the game: "Although cultural rhetoric will always be intrinsically present in a game, it also can be actively incorporated into a game design. For example, the Mad Magazine Game takes a typical board game winning condition (accumulating the most money) and turns it on its head: the actual way to win the Mad Magazine Game is to lose all of your money .This simple formal reversal has a strong impact on the cultural rhetoric of the game. Parodying a Monopoly-style winner-take-all game, the Mad Magazine Game calls attention to conventional ideologies of greed and economic power. Just like Mad Magazine itself, the game pokes fun at American institutions and values." They further note that "Whether a game's cultural rhetoric is unconsciously implicit (Monopoly's capitalistic ideology) or consciously playful (The Mad Magazine Game's satiric reversal), it involves the play of cultural values. ... It is not entirely clear whether The Mad Magazine Game ultimately undermines or reinforces the capitalistic rhetoric it parodies. But the fact that it plays with such ideas at all reveals the presumptions of more rigid structures involving economics, competitive conflict, and even game design. By highlighting the rigid structures it puts "at play," a game can shed light on the operations of culture as a whole." Finally, they comment that "The parodic inversion of the Mad Magazine Game is premised on the idea of play as frivolous, even while its very reference to Monopoly-style games invokes the rhetoric of play as power."

Philip Orbanes in the book The Game Makers: The Story of Parker Brothers from Tiddledy Winks to Trivial Pursuit commented that "This game turned game playing on its ear. Its object was to lose all of one's money by moving backward around a board (sometimes while clucking like a chicken). Licensing had provided a controversial source of endorsement since the era of "pep" and the awakening of American culture. In theory, a popular personality or movie or program already had a core audience willing to buy products endorsed by their favorites. But the game-buying public is fickle. Not every program or celebrity engenders the kind of competition that makes for a compelling game."

Ron Cerabona for The Canberra Times wrote that the goal of the game "was admirably clear: the winner was the first player to lose all their money. It was one of a kind: how many board games make you act like a rock, cluck like a chicken or swap places (and money) with other players?"

== Reviews ==
- Jeux & Stratégie #15

== See also ==
- The Mad Magazine Card Game
