= Titan (board game) =

Fantasy board game

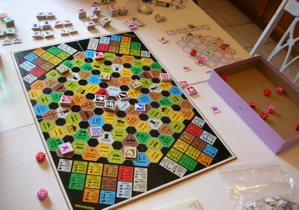
- Titan board game
- Designers: Jason McAllister; David A. Trampier
- Publishers: Avalon Hill, Valley Games
- Publication: 1980
- Genres: Board wargame
- Players: 2–6
- Playing time: 2-6 hours
- Chance: Medium (dice rolling)

Titan is a fantasy board game for two to six players, designed by Jason B. McAllister and David A. Trampier. Each player controls an army of mythological creatures such as gargoyles, unicorns, and griffons, led by a single titan. The titan is analogous to the king in chess in that the death of a titan eliminates that player and his entire army from the game. The player controlling the last remaining titan wins the game. The game was first published in 1980 by Gorgonstar; the rights were later licensed to Avalon Hill and Valley Games. Upon its release, the game received positive reviews.

== Background ==
Titan was first published in 1980 by Gorgonstar, a small company created by the designers. Soon afterward, the rights were licensed to Avalon Hill, which made several minor revisions and published the game for many years. Titan went out of print in 1998, when Avalon Hill was sold and ceased operations. A new edition of Titan, with artwork by Kurt Miller and Mike Doyle and produced by Canadian publisher Valley Games became available in late 2008. The Valley Games edition was adapted to the Apple iPad and released on December 21, 2011.

== Gameplay ==
The main game board consists of 96 interlocking hexes, each with a specified terrain type and color.

Each player's army is organized into "legions" of one to seven creature tokens stacked face down. The legions move according to die roll, subject to restrictions marked on the board—Most board spaces can only be entered or exited from certain directions. No two legions may occupy the same hex on the game board.

If a legion moves into a hex which is occupied by an enemy legion, the two legions must fight to the death on a tactical map specific to that terrain. The terrain usually gives a battle advantage to creatures native there.

Terrain	Color
Brush
Desert
Hills
Jungle
Marsh
Mountains
Plains
Swamp
Tower
Tundra
Woods

Each time a legion moves, it may recruit one additional creature if the territory to which it moves is native to at least one creature already in the legion. For example, centaurs may recruit in the plains and woods, ogres may recruit in the marsh and hills.

Each creature may recruit its own kind, but multiple weak creatures may be eligible to recruit more powerful creatures. For example, one ogre in the marsh or hills may recruit only another ogre, but two ogres in the marsh may recruit a troll, while three ogres in the hills may recruit a minotaur.

The victor of each battle is awarded points based on strength of the creatures vanquished. For each hundred points a player earns, he is awarded an angel, a strong creature which can teleport from its own legion to aid an attacking legion in future battles. Also, for each one hundred points a player earns, his titan becomes stronger in battle. Finally, at four hundred points, a player's titan gains the ability to teleport on a roll of six, attacking any enemy legion regardless of position.

== Strategy ==
Designer McAllister writes of the importance of blocking in Titan and arranging one's legions in a defensive position to prevent another player from easy movement of recruiting. There are a variety of general strategies players use to traverse the map with their legions. One example of this is what McCallister calls "the caravan", which is keeping legions following each other on the outer ring of map spaces where they can protect and support each other. Given that the outer ring is not the most desirable place for recruiting, the Caravan is usually used as a short term strategy for protecting forces until a better recruiting area can be found.

Writer Gerald Lientz emphasizes that the main strategic rule of movement is to keep one's enemies in front of you at all times. Since the movement system often allows movement in one direction but not another, the worst situation a player can find oneself in is one in which an opponent can follow one's legions with no risk of retaliation.

Unlike many wargames, players are not allowed to examine opposing enemy forces (they are hidden under legion markers) until they engage them in battle. This secrecy allows opportunities for deception and bluffing.

== Reception ==
In the November 1980 edition of The Space Gamer (No. 33) Jerry Epperson commented that "If you don't mind having a fragile, 'blood-bath' game in your collection, Titan is definitely for you. If you do not care for slaughter-type games, the Titan will be a little rough, especially for [the price]."

In the April 1981 edition of Dragon (No. 48), Bill Fawcett found the production values of the first edition produced by GorgonStar were questionable, especially the playing pieces silk-screened with a water-soluble ink that came off on fingers as they were handled. But he found the game itself "is a very sophisticated fantasy game with original ideas, clearly written rules and a very playable game system." He did note that the game was not perfect. "Play occasionally gets bogged down. This is especially true in games where everyone plays conservatively and avoids battles, which will commonly occur the first few times new players try the game." Fawcett concluded that "All in all, Titan is far higher in quality than were the first efforts some companies that are now major manufacturers."

In the December 1982 edition of The Space Gamer (No. 58), Paul Manz commented that "Titan is a refreshing change from involved FRP games. For those of you who haven't tried a fantasy game, Titan is a good one to start out with."

Charles Vasey reviewed Titan for White Dwarf #46, and stated that "The game is not only tightly designed, it is pretty vicious. If you go into a fight, then only one side can survive, and if the attacker does not win within a certain time-frame in each battle he is defeated."

In the October 1983 edition of Imagine, Paul Cockburn stated that "in the end, you have an abstracted wargame, attractively packaged, in which the pieces do represent something, as in chess, but where this has no importance to the playing of the game, just to its feel. And Titan has a very good feel to it indeed. It is the best boardgame I have come across for a while."

In Issue 4 of AGS, Deke Young noted that the game "is both easy to learn and impossible to master. A player can build up a tremendous position yet still be eliminated as quickly by another player." Young called the movement rules "hard to understand at first" but concluded, "Titan is a game every gamer can enjoy."

In a retrospective review of Titan in Black Gate, John ONeill said "There are classic fantasy games and there are classic fantasy games. Jai Kamani and David A. Trampier's Titan, a massive game of conflict between mythological armies of ogres, unicorns, griffons, and other creatures, was perhaps the most ubiquitous fantasy game of my youth."

== Reviews ==
- Asimov's Science Fiction v7 n13 (1983 12 Mid)
- Adventure Gaming #2
