= Empiric =

Empiric can refer to:

- Asclepiades of Bithynia
- A person who practices quackery
- Empiric school of medicine in ancient Greece and Rome
- Empiric therapy, therapy based on clinical educated guesses

== See also ==
- Empirical (disambiguation)
