= Manifesto Games =

Computer game retailer

Manifesto Games was an ecommerce retailer of downloadable computer games, specializing in independently developed games aimed at hardcore gamers. It was founded in October 2005 by Greg Costikyan and Johnny L. Wilson, former editor of Computer Gaming World, and is based in New York City. The company was announced September 29, 2005. Costikyan was the company's CEO while Wilson was executive vice president for community and content. On June 23, 2009, Costikyan announced that Manifesto was closing its doors, citing the 2008-2009 economic downturn, a lack of venture capital, and problems successfully marketing the company as a destination for independent games.

According to Manifesto Games' manifesto, the company aimed to avoid the narrowness of conventional retail channels by selling a large number of games (taking advantage of The Long Tail), and allow developers to experiment technically and artistically. An example of Manifesto Games' willingness to take risks is its support of Super Columbine Massacre RPG!.

The Manifesto Games website was originally designed in ironic imitation of the Soviet Union in its early years; some of its content still reflects this choice.

== Play This Thing ==
Initially, Manifesto Games also provided reviews of indie games, including games it does not sell, and discussion forums. In September 2007, Manifesto Games created a new game review website, Play This Thing. A team of reviewers including Greg Costikyan and Emily Short posted one review per day at the website, covering independent, alternative reality and 'big urban' games, interactive fiction, and mods. Most of the games reviewed had no relation to Manifesto Games. The site carried reviews of non-computer games on "Tabletop Tuesdays". The site was shut down in 2014.
