= Divine Right (game) =

Fantasy tabletop wargame

- Box cover by Kenneth Rahman
- Designers: Glenn A. Rahman; Kenneth Rahman
- Illustrators: David A. Trampier; Kenneth Rahman; Chris Turner
- Publishers: TSR, Inc.; The Right Stuf International; Worthington Publishing
- Publication: 1979 1st edition; 1980 2nd edition; 2002 25th Anniversary edition; 2024
- Genres: Fantasy board wargame

Divine Right is a fantasy board wargame designed by brothers Glenn A. Rahman and Kenneth Rahman. The game was first published in 1979 by TSR, Inc., and a 25th Anniversary Edition was published in 2002 by The Right Stuf International.

== Overview ==
Divine Right is played on a full-color map of the fantasy world of Minaria, using counters to designate armies, fleets, barbarians, mercenaries, and other fighting forces. It is a turn-based war game that uses dice for all rolls. Magical creatures and items are also employed in an attempt to win the game through amassing more victory points than your opponents. Victory points are awarded for plundering castles and killing or capturing opposing monarchs.

This two- to six-player game incorporates combat, castle sieges, and diplomacy in a fantasy setting. Players use everything from fleets to mercenaries to magical creatures to special military leaders. Players are affected by usual events in war: weather, mutinies, plagues, etc. Victory is obtained by one of two methods: score the most points by the end of the 20th turn, or eliminate all opponents.

To make all this happen, the game includes kingdom cards, personality cards, diplomacy cards, dice, unit counters, a full color game map and complete instructions.

The diplomacy system is perhaps the most novel element in Divine Right. Each turn a player draws a diplomacy card. The card either allows the player to bring a special mercenary unit into play or provides a modifier towards an attempt to bring a country into play on your side or leave an alliance with an opposing player. While each player controls their home country, most countries begin the game neutral and only fight for a player if brought into an alliance via a diplomacy die roll influenced by diplomacy cards. Another diplomatic action allows players to attempt to raise barbarian hordes at the board's edge, although a bad roll will cause the barbarians to burn the player's ambassador at the stake, thus preventing any diplomacy on the player's next turn.

== History ==
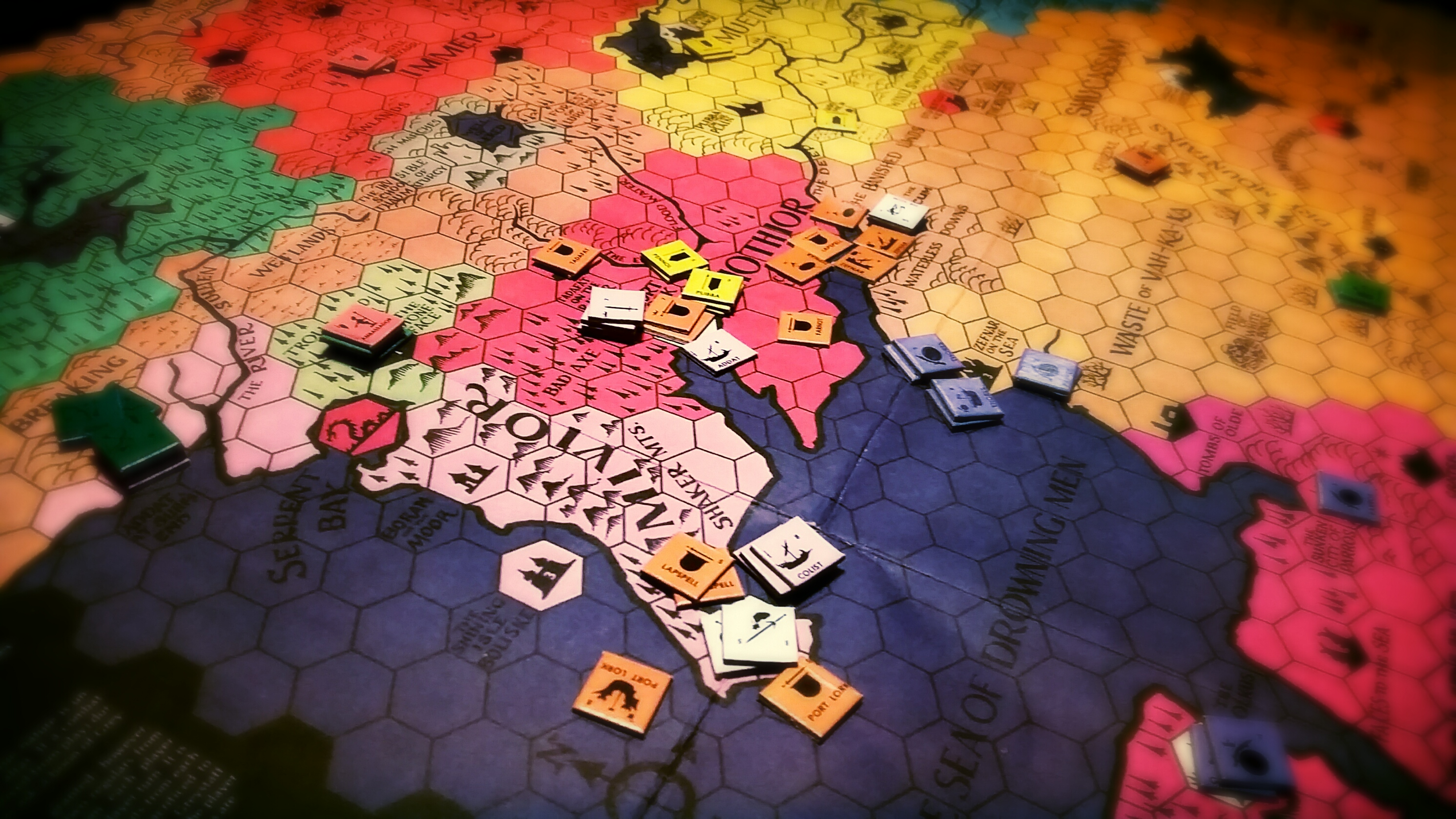
Playing Divine Right. Here Port Lork, the capital of the nation of Hothior, is under siege by a coalition of armies. (2015)

Divine Right was developed by brothers Glenn and Kenneth Rahman based on their earlier, unpublished game Your Excellency. Glenn Rahman credits his background writing stories for semi-pro magazines with inspiring the effort to add characterization to the story through the use of "personality cards" and elaborate background stories. The use of a fantasy setting was inspired by Chaosium's White Bear and Red Moon, while the implementation of magic and the mythology of Minaria, the game world, was inspired by the works of J. R. R. Tolkien, Robert E. Howard, H. P. Lovecraft, and Clark Ashton Smith. This background was detailed in an appendix to the original game manual and in a series of 20 articles titled Minarian Legends appearing in Dragon magazine. Glenn also credits the artwork by his brother Kenneth with helping ensure its continued popularity, calling it "a quantum leap over the drab art that had illustrated most games until then."

Divine Right was originally released in 1979 by Tactical Studies Rules, Inc. (TSR). The second edition was released in 1980 and included several original additions as well as elements from the articles appearing in Dragon magazine at the time. The game was sold for several years and set many precedents in turn-based wargaming.

25th Anniversary Edition cover

The game was updated by the original authors and was released in 2002 as a 25th Anniversary Edition by The Right Stuf International, which in addition to the original game included a bonus CD and an autographed certificate of authenticity. The entire 2000 copy limited run of this version was sold.

== Legacy ==
Since 1997, J. McCrackan edited the game for Glenn Rahman, developing a deluxe edition of Divine Right.

In late 2023 Glenn Rahmann came to a publishing agreement with Pungo Games, a division of Worthington Publishing. In 2024, the game was offered as an updated version with hard mounted board, full color updated components in a Kickstarter campaign which received US$114,609 against the initial goal of US$19,790. After the campaign ended, it was made available commercially.

== Art ==
The mapboard for the original 1979 edition was by David A. Trampier. The cover art is by "Elrohir," a nom de plume of Kenneth Rahman, brother of Glenn Rahman.

== Reception ==
Steve List reviewed Divine Right in Ares Magazine #1, rating it a 7 out of 9. List commented that "This description tells nothing of the artistry and humor that went into its making, or the many ramifications and possible strategies available to a player."

Doug Traversa reviewed Divine Right in The Space Gamer No. 29. Traversa commented that "Overall, this is an excellent game; no two play sessions are alike. The challenge of playing a different kingdom keeps players thinking, and the variety of special units can alter events quickly. It will be a long time before players grow bored with Divine Right; I give it my highest recommendation."

In a retrospective review in Issue 30 of Simulacrum, Brian Train commented, "Divine Right combines the whimsy of a fantasy RPG with an old-school, beer & pretzel wargame. [...] if you like the quirky fantasy worlds of the 70s you absolutely can’t go wrong with Divine Right. It's a classic game and is worth seeking out, if you look for a light hearted but rich game with lots of action and epic battles."

In a review of Divine Right in Black Gate, Fletcher Vredenburgh said "In my experience, most players have the same strategy: build up their forces and then swoop in on the weakest opponent. You can go after neutral powers, but then they immediately ally with another player. The problem, of course, is that everyone might look like the weakest opponent to some other player. Once a player looks like their losing, there's a chance every other player will turn on him, looking for easy victory points. And this, in turn, can leave an attacker's cities open to attack from somewhere else. Most games turn into a free-for-all, grand melee by the midpoint, and it's awesome."

== Reviews ==
- Syfy
