= The Farming Game =

1979 farm management board game

the game invented on the seat of a tractor
- Manufacturers: The Weekend Farmer Company
- Designers: George Rohrbacher
- Publication: 1979
- Years active: 10+
- Players: 2-6
- Playing time: 240 minutes
- Chance: high
- Website: www.farmgame.com

The Farming Game is a board game simulating the economics of a small farm. Published in 1979, it was designed by George Rohrbacher, a rancher in Washington state. The Farming Game painfully reflects the real-life difficulties of running a farm. The names and places in the game are the names of families that have farmed for generations in the Yakima Valley and other parts of Central Washington. When Rohrbacher invented the game, it was a desperate time for his failing farm and small family, which is reflected in the difficulty of the game, and the multitude of points taken into consideration in farming that are often left up to chance. The publisher claims that the game has "been used in schools all over the world".

== History ==
The background for the game is Rohrbacher's "1,500 acre farm near Goldendale" in July 1979. The farm was facing bankruptcy and his wife was pregnant and had decided to quit her job. A friend suggested to Rohrbacher that he should invent a game like Monopoly, but based around the struggles of life as a farmer near the Yakima River, where they lived. As he was baling hay early one morning, he considered and developed the idea. To produce the first edition they borrowed $90,000 and had it produced by "the handicapped at Portland's Goodwill Industries".

The first copy was ready in four months and after six weeks almost 8,000 copies had been sold. The game sold more than 150,000 copies by 1985, the profits from which saved Rohrbacher's farm. By 1995, the estimate of copies sold was 350,000.

In 1994 the World Bank arranged for a translation of the game into Russian "to help teach Russian farmers the ins and outs of capitalistic farming."

A card game version and a version for children were also released.

Rohrbacher also served in the Washington State Senate, as a Commissioner for the Columbia River Gorge National Scenic Area.

== Objective ==
The premise of the game is that each player inherited twenty acres of farming land from their "Grandpa". This is not enough to live on, so players must continue with their current job in town, which brings in $5,000 that can be invested into the farm each game year. Players can also borrow up to $50,000 from the bank, lease grazing pastures in the hills, and buy new land. The first player to expand their farm to $250,000 in net assets so that they can quit the town job without going bankrupt wins.

Elements of the game are intended to reflect aspects of real-life farming. For example, players sometimes encounter Farmer's Fate cards that are either good or bad, similar to the Chance cards found in Monopoly. One such card allows a player to collect $2,000 from every player who has no harvester, if you own one. Another card informs that due to the IRS garnishing your income, you may not collect on any of your harvests for the rest of the year. These cards are intended to reflect the element of chance or luck that is involved in farming, which is the aim of the game.

== Game play ==
The board itself is divided into squares representing forty-nine of the fifty-two weeks in a year, with different sections grouped together under the usual harvest for that season. While there are multiple sections for harvesting hay (the first, second, third, and even fourth cutting), purchases may only be made during winter. After profiting from the harvest, the farmer must often pay operating expense, whilst the harvest may be skipped, halved or doubled or more.

Players take turns rolling a die, traveling around the board, harvesting their crops when they can. Crops are purchased through O.T.B. (Option to Buy) cards usually referencing "Neighbor Sells Out: 10 Acres Grain". The crops are grouped into hay, fruit, grain, and cattle. What balances this game, and provides the most difficulty for real life farmers, are operating expenses. In The Farming Game, whenever a player harvests a crop, he draws a card entitled Operating Expense, examples of which are "Pay $500 for Irrigation" or "Seed Bill Due: Pay $1,000". Also, certain spaces on the board instruct the player to draw a Farmer's Fate card. Farmer's Fate cards are usually unfortunate for the player, including references to the drought in the 1970s, Mt. St. Helens erupting, or chemical mishaps in which all the player's livestock are slaughtered. There are also expenses or bonuses incurred while traveling the board - some spaces instruct you to pay a fee for Winter-killed wheat or owning cattle, while another gives you a bonus of $1000 for a convenient "warm snap" early in the year.

== Other mediums ==
The Farming Game was adapted for Windows 3.1 in 1997, when it won the 1997 Mahnke Multimedia Award for Best new education title given by the Association for Educational Communications and Technology (AECT), an international organization.

The Farming Game was also adapted for Mac in November 2012 by Game Masterminds, a licensee of The Weekend Farmer Co. It was available for download on PC, Mac and Linux as late as 2018.
