= Slobbovia =

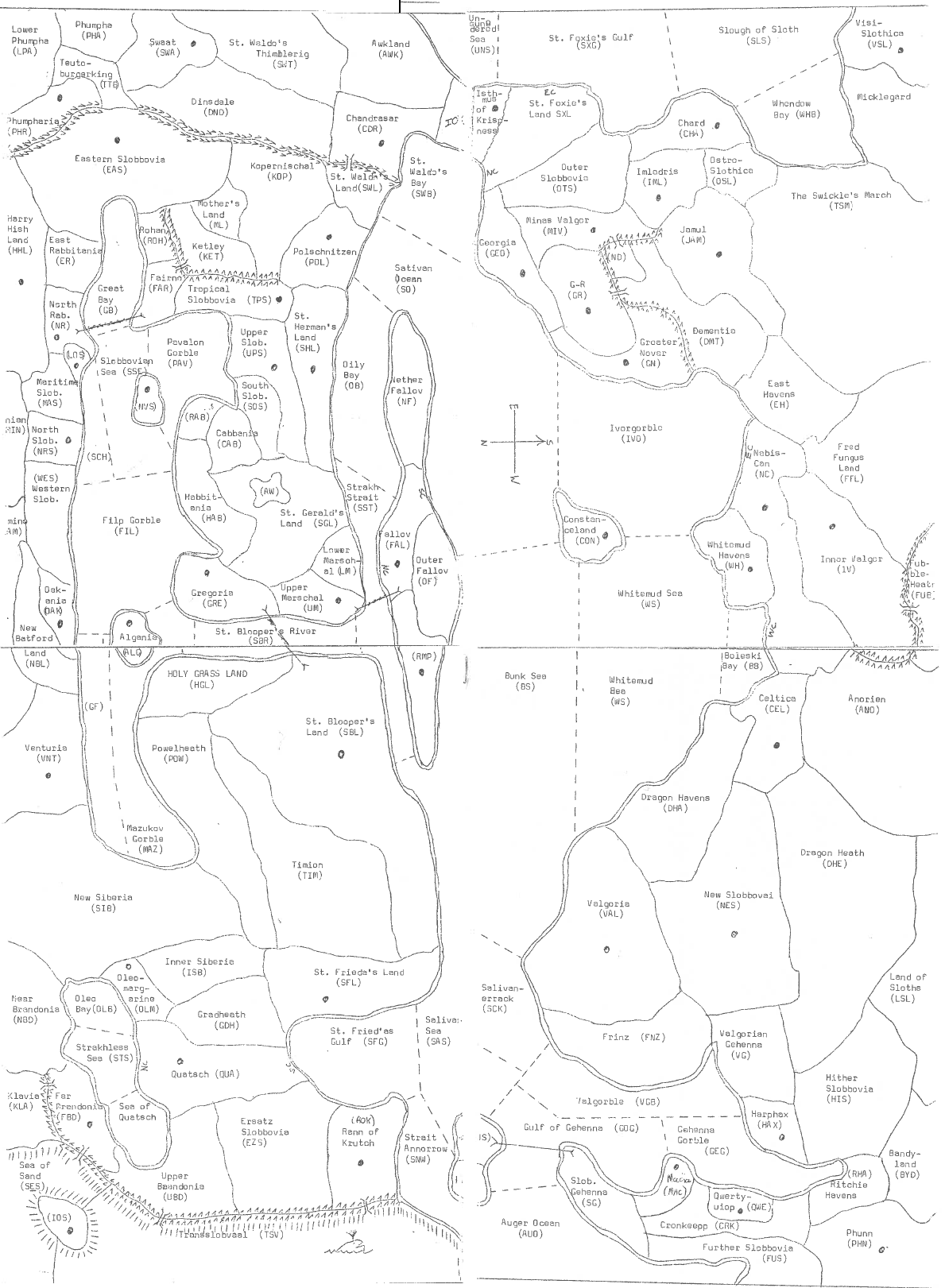
- Map of Slobbovia from issue #69 with "proper" S-N orientation.

Slobbovia was a variant of the world conquest board game Diplomacy that ran as one continuous game from 1972 to 1986. Unlike Diplomacy, where the moves of the game that result in victory are most important, Slobbovia considered the stories told about the game to be just as important.

== History ==
The game first started in Killarney, Manitoba in 1969 as an impromptu make-belief game invented by a group of Venturer Scouts. The game was originally a version of King of the Mountain called Emperor of Slobovia, [sic] using splashing battles in canoes using paddles. The name Slobovia came from the perpetually frozen country of Lower Slobbovia that occasionally appeared in Al Capp's daily comic strip Li'l Abner.

Each player made up a persona of one of the lords of Slobbovia, and the first map of the region was based on the summer camp where the game had been invented. Place names were based on features around the camp. For example, Cabinania was named after a cabin.

In the early 1970s, some of the players became involved in the game of Diplomacy, resulting in a postal variant called Slobbovia. Unlike Diplomacy, where a single game is played and forgotten, in Slobbovia, there was one continuous game, and the stories about the game were considered the most important part. The two major parts of the game were "strumph" (the military and political game moves) and "strakh" (the stories about the game moves.) Each player had a character who could own lands and armies — for example, Greg Costikyan's character was named Elektrifikatsiya von Schneider — and each player could also have a number of auxiliary characters who could also be the focus of the player's "strakh".

The game was originally moderated and "strumph" and "strakh" published through a zine titled Слобинполит Журнал (transliterated from Cyrillic as Slobinpolit Zhurnal, meaning "Slobbovian political journal"). Issues 1–26 were created by some of the original Canadian players, primarily James Ritchie and Roger Nelson with help from other classmates, and produced on their school's mimeograph. After they moved to colleges and universities, the original players introduced the game to new players, and word spread through science fiction conventions.

John Carroll, a student at Penn State University, introduced the game to university bookstore manager Charles Sharp. It was Sharp who brought considerable development to the game, as an editor, writer and with his access to publishing equipment. Issues 27–41 were published by Sharp.

In December 1974, Sharp summarized just three years of the game as

wars between the Great Families, the Vurklemyers, Gregovltches, Strakenviches, and between the races, the Venturians, Huns, Rabbitanians, Pameranians, Slobbovians, Rumpletitsvicklians. There have been civil wars like the Trad-Mod War in Slobbovia or the First War of the Valgorian Succession in Valgoria. There has been the growth of the Holy Slobbovian Church, the migrations of the cronks, the search of Garbage Man and Tanteau for the Midnight Environmentalist and TORCON. There are the depredations of Thesaurus Rex, the monster that destroys anyone with a vocabulary of less than 20,000 words, and the dread monks of Mafang Fubar, practitioners of the ancient Slobbovian art of self-defence, Mung Fu (fighting with body odor). There are the great cities: Strakenville , Nova Slobbovia's St. Waldo'sburg, Gregorgrad, Kopperplug, Yubwet's Deep and Vichysoisse, site of the abortive Vichysoisse Summit between Czar Raoul the Rude and Aleksander of Valgoria.

When Sharp had to step away from the game, seven people formed an APA titled APA-Slobbovia, with each of them taking turns as editor.

One hundred and nine issues of Slobinpolit Zhurnal were published, with a frequency that varied over the lifetime of the game. At the beginning of Charlie Sharp's stewardship, the deadlines were three weeks apart. The increasing volume of players' "strakh" or press, with the burden this placed on the publisher(s), caused this to go to a monthly, then eventually a bimonthly, schedule. The last few issues came out at irregular intervals, and the game finally ended in 1986.

== Reception ==
Glen Taylor, writing for Dijagh, commented, "If you enjoy Diplomacy press at all ... then you'd love Slobbovia ... The major boast of Slobbovia, in fact, its raison d'etre , is Press! 60 pages of excellent-to-fair Press (written by only about 12 active players) is the rather astonishing average for an issue of the Slobinpolit Zhurnal, while the ceiling for actual game mechanics (strumph, as opposed to strakh, the press) has rarely gone above the 5-page mark. It is a press-writer's bonanza!"

In Issue 8 of Lilaf, Donald Wileman called it "a game with a beautiful principle: press is king. If you want something to happen, you write about it often and convincingly enough that others accept it and it happens. At least in theory."

=== Other publications ===
Besides the Zhurnal, there were several other publications pertaining to Slobbovia and its milieu.

- Neurse Schivosk was a forum for communication between the publishers who took turns adjudicating the game and putting out the Zhurnal, published by one of their number selected as the "Arkhivist." The Arkhivist was also responsible for maintaining the accounts (game fees and postage) of the non-publisher players of the game. Budos Paraszt was its short-lived replacement toward the end of the Zhurnal's run, as the players sought a way to keep the game going.
- Boleski's Unkonkize Hiztory of Slobbovia was a history of Slobbovia written by James Ritchie, as his then-character of Cardinal Justinian Urbanus Boleski.
- The Novice Packet was a collection of articles and introductory material designed for the new player.
- Slobinzongbuk was a compilation of Slobbovian filking songs.

== Legacy ==
Several science fiction/fantasy writers and game designers were players, including Greg Costikyan, Bruce Schlickbernd, and Edgar Award-winning author Sharyn McCrumb.
