= Colony Delta =

Board game

Box cover artwork by Jeff Dee, 1979

Colony Delta, subtitled "Earth vs. Sigma Draconix with a Colony World in the Balance", is a science fiction board wargame published by Fantasy Games Unlimited (FGU) in 1979.

== Description ==
Colony Delta is a two-player game where humans and aliens vie for control of a wealthy colony world in the 23rd century.

=== Components ===
The game box contains:

- mounted 17" x 22" hex grid map board
- 532 die-cut counters
- rulebook
- reference card

=== Setup ===
Both players are given 100 points to purchase equipment. Each places one spaceport on the planet Delta, and one shuttlecraft, and their other equipment on their home planet.

=== Gameplay ===
Both players try to earn as many points as possible from mining and agriculture, which they can maximize by taking land from the other player. War is not inevitable; and the players can attempt to use diplomatic and other means rather than warfare.

=== Victory conditions ===
At the end of the game, the player with the most accumulated points is the winner.

== Publication history ==
Colony Delta was designed by Adam L. Gruen, and was published in 1979 by FGU with artwork by Jeff Dee.

== Reception ==
In the inaugural issue of Ares (March 1980), Steve List found the game stultifying, saying "The chief drawback with the basic game is the lack of action. Each player may only make six round-trip deliveries to the planet in twelve turns, and must use these to bring in everything (not only colonists). The advance game removes these limits, but will last for a decent while." List concluded by giving the game a poor rating of only 5 out of 9.

In Issue 30 of Phoenix (March–April 1981), S. J. Hackett liked the physical components of the game, and also found the rulebook "well illustrated, concise and clear to follow." Hackett noted that "The game's attraction lies in the way that the initial economic basis of colonisation leads to tension between the two sides – and eventually, but never inevitably, to full-scale war." He concluded, "Colony Delta fascinated me both as a game, as a simulation of the way in which economics and politics are so securely – yet helplessly tied to each other, and as a very absorbing occupation."
