= Wormy (comic strip) =

American fantasy comic strip

- Wormy by David A. Trampier, 1983
- Author: David A. Trampier
- Launch date: September 1977
- End date: April 1988
- Publisher: Dragon Magazine
- Genre(s): Humor, fantasy

Wormy is an American fantasy comic strip written and illustrated by David A. Trampier. It follows a talking dragon named Wormy. The strip was originally serialized in the role-playing magazine Dragon.

The September 1977 issue of Dragon (Issue #9) featured the first 6-panel comic of Wormy. The first comic featured the title character, a cigar-chomping, pool hustling, wargaming dragon, and subsequent issues revealed the cast of goblins and ogres who were his neighbors and friends. Wormy continued to appear in Dragon for the next 10 years, until Issue #132 (April 1988).

== Disappearance ==
In the late 1980s, Wormy creator David A. Trampier abruptly vanished from public life. The final installment of Wormy ended the strip in the middle of an unfinished storyline. No further Wormy comics were ever published.
