= Earth Game =

Earth Game is a 1979 board game published by Fantasy Pastimes.

== Gameplay ==
Earth Game is a cooperative game in which players control parts of the Earth and manage its resources to solve problems.

== Reception ==
Eric Paperman reviewed Earth Game in The Space Gamer No. 32. Paperman commented that "Simple yet enjoyable, this game could provide a welcome change of pace for those gamers tired of being ganged up on in multi-player games. However, gamers looking for a game filled with fighting, double-dealing, and all the other amenities of the average multi-player game will have to look elsewhere."
