= Empirical (disambiguation) =

Empirical may refer to:

Epistemic topics

- Empiricism, a theory of knowledge as coming only or primarily from experience
- Empirical evidence, a source of knowledge acquired by means of observation or experimentation
- Empirical research, a way of gaining knowledge by means of direct and indirect observation or experience
- Empirical relationship, a relationship based solely on observation rather than theory
- Quasi-empirical method, as close to empiricism as is possible when experience cannot falsify
- Empirical limits in science, problems with observation, and thus are limits of human ability to inquire and answer questions

Music

- Empirical, the alternative title for the 1972 Jaki Byard album There'll Be Some Changes Made
- Empirical (jazz band), a British jazz group, formed in 2007, with four musicians

Other topics (many are applications of epistemic themes)

- Empirical distribution function, the cumulative distribution function associated with the empirical measure of the sample
- Empirical formula, the simplest positive integer ratio of atoms present in a chemical compound
- Empirical likelihood, an estimation method in statistics
- Empirical measure, a random measure arising from a particular realization of a (usually finite) sequence of random variables
- Empirical modelling, computer modelling based on empirical observations rather than on mathematically describable relationships of the system modelled
- Empirical probability, the ratio of the number of outcomes in which a specified event occurs to the total number of trials
- Empirical process, a stochastic process that describes the proportion of objects in a system in a given state
- Empiric therapy, therapy based on clinical educated guesses
- Empirical, a research vessel that was used by Darth Vader in Star Wars
