= Space Future =

Space Future is a 1979 board game published by Family Pastimes.

== Gameplay ==
Space Future is a cooperative game in which players are involved in peaceful space exploration.

== Reception ==
Eric B. Paperman reviewed Space Future in The Space Gamer No. 31. Paperman commented that "Overall, the game is very simple one [...] which will probably only be of interest to those people who have children (or gamer friends) who scream and throw things when they lose. It might be fun for those gamers who wish to play a game where they can without beating their friends."
