= 4th Dimension (board game) =

Board game

4th Dimension is a 1979 board game published by TSR.

== Gameplay ==
4th Dimension is a game in which the armies of the time-lords battle each other, while humanity has conquered the 4th dimension.

== Publication history ==
4th Dimension was originally published in Games & Puzzles magazine, and the designers published a standalone game that same year. It was later licensed for publication by TSR.

== Reception ==
Fred Hemmings reviewed the original self-published version of Fourth Dimension for White Dwarf #3, giving it an overall rating of 7 out of 10, and stated that "unless you can't stand purely cerebral games I would recommend the purchase of 4D."

Andy Davis reviewed 4th Dimension in The Space Gamer No. 35. Davis commented that "4th Dimension is easy, but also fun and playable. I would recommend it to the average SF gamer, who has enough money, but definitely not to a simulation fan."

== Reviews ==
- Dragon #31
