= Knights and Knaves (board game) =

Knights and Knaves is a 1979 board game published by Nimrod Game Development.

== Gameplay ==
Knights and Knaves is a game which focuses on the relationships between the lords and vassals of a Central European empire during the period of the High Middle Ages.

== Reception ==
David Ladyman reviewed Knights and Knaves in The Space Gamer No. 37. Ladyman commented that "K&K was obviously stripped down to [keep the price low]. For a little extra, it could be an excellent game [for a higher price]. I wish the effort had been made."
