= Sigma Omega =

Board game

Sigma Omega is a 1979 board game published by Game Technology.

== Gameplay ==
Sigma Omega is a tactical game that simulates science fiction space combat.

== Reception ==
Forrest Johnson reviewed Sigma Omega in The Space Gamer No. 28. Johnson commented that "Obi-Wan Kenobi could find this game a challenge. The rules read like instructions for a nuclear reaction, and contain some confusing errors. However, some people will find the play exciting. Sigma Omega will probably have a cult following for some years to come."
