= War of the Sky Cities =

Board game

War of the Sky Cities is a 1979 board wargame published by Fantasy Games Unlimited.

== Gameplay ==
War of the Sky Cities is a two player game in which post-holocaust human and mutant survivors engage in battle using huge flying cities.

== Reception ==
J. S. Thomas reviewed War of the Sky Cities in The Space Gamer No. 30. Thomas commented that "If you are a fan of tactical space combat and want a quick, simple game, this might be worth a look. But as a game of sky cities, it just doesn't fly."
