= The Mad Magazine Card Game =

1979 card game

The Mad Magazine Card Game is a shedding-type card game produced by Parker Brothers in 1979. The game's cards all picture Alfred E. Neuman. It is similar in nature to crazy eights and Uno, where the player's goal is to lose all of their cards.

== Rules and Gameplay ==
The Mad Magazine Card Game is a game for two to six players. The game begins with the dealer shuffling the deck, dealing cards to each player, and creating the draw pile. A card is taken from the deck and put in the discard pile to begin the game, and play begins in a counterclockwise direction from the dealer. A player can play their card into the discard pile if it has the same number, color, picture, or message as the face-up card. Wild cards can be played on any card. If a player can not, or chooses not to play they take the first card off the deck and add it to their hand. If they can play the card they drew, they may do so. The winner is the first person to lose all of their cards.

== Cards ==
The game has 76 cards, both numbered and special. There are four suits, each with a color- green, yellow, red, and blue. They picture Alfred E. Nueman wearing a leisure suit, space suit, union suit, and suit of armor, respectively. Each suit has two sets of cards numbered 1-6. The other cards included are:

Which Way? cards- The player gets to choose the direction of play, remaining the same or going the opposite direction. There are two of each color.

Draw 1 You Varmints cards- Forces the player's opponents to draw one card, in turn. There is one of each color.

Give Someone Two (from your hand) cards- The player gives an opponent two cards from their hand. There is one of each color.

Wild! cards- The player can play this no matter the card showing, and they may choose the color that the next player must play. There are four wilds. There are also Wild! cards with additional instructions, which the player can choose to follow or ignore, and simply use as a wild card. Wild cards with instructions (known as and/or wilds) are:

- Wild And Wooly! cards- The player chooses an opponent to draw three cards.
- Exchange Your Hand With Anyone Cards- The player can switch hands with an opponent.
- What Me Worry? You Worry! cards- Besides the wild functionality, this card has two uses. This is the only card that can be played when it is not the player's turn. It can be used to nullify an opponent's Exchange your hand with anyone card. If the player is targeted, they can play this card, choose the color, and not have to exchange their hand. It also can be used to reverse the effect of any other special card. For instance, if the player is targeted with a Give someone two cards, they can play this card and give two cards from their own hand to that opponent.

Joker- The game has one joker, which can be used as a wild card. However, if the player has 1-3 cards remaining in their hand, they can end the game. Everyone adds up the "points" in their hand, and the person with the fewest points wins in this scenario. Points are calculated by the face value of cards, or 5 if they are wild.

The game also contains four blank cards, which the user is instructed to remove from the game immediately, and instead use as floor tiles or coasters.

== Release ==
The game was first advertised in a Mad Magazine in the December 1980 issue, along with The Mad Magazine Board Game. The advertisement tells readers "If your losing streak is becoming a way of life, you're in luck!" Parker Brothers published The Mad Magazine Card Game in 1980 as a companion game to The Mad Magazine Game board game, and featured art by Jack Davis. The publication of the card game was attributed to the success of the board game.

== Reception ==
The game has a rating of 5.8 out of 10 based on 399 ratings on BoardGameGeek.

== See also ==
- The Mad Magazine Game
