= Sqwurm =

1979 card game

Sqwurm is a 1979 card game designed by Merle M. Rasmussen and published by Game Time Productions.

== Gameplay ==
Sqwurm is a fantasy card game where the players use cards to create a dragon while preventing anyone else from conjuring their dragon first.

== Reception ==
Jerry Epperson reviewed Sqwurm in The Space Gamer No. 29. Epperson commented that "Sqwurm is a game that you will either love or hate. It is simple enough that an 8-year-old can play it, but the strategies that are possible in the game rival those of a boardgame."
