= StarGate (board game) =

1979 science fiction board game

StarGate is a science fiction board game published by Simulations Publications, Inc. (SPI) in 1979 in which players wage combat via spaceships.

== Description ==
StarGate is a microgame for 2-players, with one player controlling the alien Virunians, and the other player controlling the Coalition, an alliance of several races.

=== Components ===
The game box contains:

- 11" x 17" paper hex grid map
- 40 die-cut counters
- rules pamphlet

=== Movement ===
Each parallel column of hexes is on a different plane than the adjacent columns. Ships have four options for navigation:

1. Change dimensions: By switching from one hex column to the next, the ship enters a new dimension, but doing so allows enemy ships to fire on it.
2. Gate skimming: If a ship moves towards one of the two stargates on the map, it orbits around it, and can choose which direction to leave orbit.
3. Teleportation: Some ships are able to move from one hex to any other without regard to range, but must do so in a straight line.
4. Wobbling: Some ships can "wobble", enabling them to move to any other hex on the map.

=== Combat ===
There are two types of combat:

- Approaching fire: If two opposing ships approach each other, each player chooses one of three maneuvers; the combination of the two maneuvers is then cross-indexed on a chart to give a combat result.
- Ship to ship: If two opposing ships enter the same hex, a die roll and the two ships' difference in strength determines the result.

=== Victory conditions ===
The Coalition needs to destroy six Virunian ships. The Virunians need to destroy eight Coalition ships. Whoever reaches their goal first wins the game.

== Publication history ==
In the late 1970s, Metagaming Concepts pioneered the MicroGame packaged into a ziplock bag or small flat box. The games sold well, and in 1979, SPI decided to follow suit, publishing a number of "Capsule" games in various genres, including four science fiction-themed "Space Capsule" games. "Space Capsule #2", titled StarGate, was designed by John H. Butterfield, with graphic design by Redmond A. Simonsen and illustrations by Charles Vess and Rick Bryant. SPI released it in March 1979, and it proved very popular, staying in SPI's Top Ten Bestseller list for the next year.

== Reception ==
In Issue 24 of The Space Gamer, Mark Watson compared StarGate to microgames by Metagaming Concepts. Although he found StarGate's components to be better, he thought that Metagaming's products "tend to be more interesting." Watson also found that although the various types of movement in Stargate were interesting, "the game soon becomes tedious." However, with the addition of some self-made optional rules, Watson thought the game was much improved, noting that "With such twisted tactics [...] StarGate becomes a fairly interesting game." He concluded that with those rules in place, "StarGate is definitely in a class by itself, certainly worth playing, and undoubtedly worth its current price".

In the October 1980 issue of Fantastic, game designer Greg Costikyan wrote "Star Gate is very chess-like, in that each ship moves in a particular manner. Not a bad little game, on the whole."

In Issue 27 of Simulacrum, Brian Train noted, "This game is an interesting exercise in asymmetry. The Virunians enter the game as a random mixed bag of ship components that must be assembled as Tri-Ships to be fully effective, while the Coalition ships are individually weaker."

== Other reviews and commentary ==
- The Wargamer Vol. 1 #15
- American Wargamer Vol. 6 #10
