= Wizard's Quest =

Board game

Cover art by Chris White

Wizard's Quest is a fantasy board wargame published by Avalon Hill in 1979.

== Description ==
Wizard's Quest is a fantasy game where two to six players vie for the island kingdom of Marnon.

=== Components ===
The game box holds:

- Foldout map portraying Marnon, divided into 36 numbered territories and eight castles
- Rulebook
- 2 six-sided dice, one white and one red
- 35 Petition cards
- 92 Counters (1 Wizard, 1 Dragon, 90 Orcs)
- Six armies of 52 plastic tokens in six colors (red, green, blue, yellow, pink, orange). Each "army" contains:
  - Hero
  - Mage
  - Three treasures (Crown, Chest, Ring) plus a "fake" treasure
  - 40 square-based soldiers worth one unit each, and 6 round-based soldiers worth five units each

=== Setup ===
Each player chooses an empty castle. Orcs are placed on empty castles and in some of the territories. Each player places a soldier on an empty territory, and this continues until there are no empty spaces. Players randomly deal their three treasures and fake treasure to other players. Each player then hides the treasure received on the board, but the treasures cannot be placed in castles or spaces occupied by the owning player, and no space can contain more than one treasure.

=== Gameplay ===
Players take turns attacking occupied spaces in order to search for their treasures.

Additional variables are provided by a wizard (good) and a dragon (bad), who randomly appear in different areas on each turn. Players can add more randomness to the game by choosing to draw from a deck of incident cards at the start of their turn. Most of the cards are beneficial, but some have a negative effect. Bands of orcs also roam around the board, causing problems.

=== Victory conditions ===
The first player to reclaim all three of their treasures wins the game.

== Publication history ==
Wizard's Quest was designed by Willis Carpenter, Garret Donner, Mick Uhl and Michael Steer, with cover art by Chris White. It was published in North America by Avalon Hill in 1979. Various international companies including Klee, Pelito, and Schmidt Spiele acquired the rights for international distribution in various countries.

== Reception ==
In the January–February 1980 edition of The Space Gamer (Issue No. 26), Mark Brady concluded that it "is a fun little game".

In the January 1980 edition of Dragon (Issue 33), Bill Fawcett called Wizard's Quest "just plain fun." He found the game components to be of excellent quality, although he was disappointed by the undistinguished artwork on the counters. Fawcett especially admired the simplicity of the rules, and recommended the game, saying, "Wizard’s Quest is a game that makes for a few pleasant hours. Like Risk or Cosmic Encounter, much depends upon how the players approach the game. It will tend to be as cutthroat or calm as the group makes it. The large number of variables ensure that every game will be different from the last. If such a thing as a Light Gaming Classic could exist, then Avalon Hill, which seems to specialize in Classic games, may have produced one."

In Issue 77 of the UK magazine Games & Puzzles, Nick Palmer called it "really a sort of murderous treasure hunt." He noted that "you can play this solitaire, but all the fun is in the multi-player interaction, with increasingly desperate attempts to stop the more successful players as their forces bear down on the final treasure." Palmer concluded by giving the game an Excitement grade of 4 out of 5.

== Other reviews ==
- The General Vol. 17 No. 4
- Jeux & Stratégie #51 (as "Thorval")
