= Swordquest (board game) =

1979 board game published by Task Force Games

Swordquest is a 1979 board game published by Task Force Games.

== Gameplay ==
Swordquest is a two- or three-player game in which the good, evil and druidic forces search for a lost artifact, in the guarded treasures of each of the towns of the fantasy land of Tiirane. The designer, R. Vance Buck, wrote in the design notes that he drew heavily upon J.R.R. Tolkien's The Lord of the Rings (LotR) for inspiration: the gameworld is peopled with dwarves, elves, a large dragon, and winged creatures named Wrogs that resemble Tolkien's balrogs. Reviewer Tony Watson noted that the gameplay is also very similar to LotR: a good team led by a white wizard and an evil team led by a sorcerer search for a lost artifact—in this case, the Sword of Lumina. As in LotR, the good team wants to destroy the artifact in fires found near the evil citadel, while the evil team wants to possess and use the artifact. An optional rule allows a third player to control a team of druids, who seek to possess the sword in order to restore balance between good and evil.

The combat resolution system uses a ritualized form of engagement of up to five opponents per side. There are some magical spells in the game, found on scrolls in the cities of the land.

Players search the lands for the sword. There are three sword counters, two of which represent counterfeit swords. The player who can get the genuine sword back to his citadel wins the game.

== Reception ==
Reviewers were unimpressed by Swordquest.

John Lambshead reviewed Swordquest for White Dwarf #18, giving it an overall rating of 6 out of 10, and stated that "In fact the whole game lacks colour. Players have identical forces and identical victory conditions. I can't see this appealing to the involved fantasy gamer."

In the May–June 1980 edition of The Space Gamer (Issue No. 28), Bruce Campbell could not recommend the game: "Swordquest has enough good points that I don't feel my money was wasted. However, better games are available for less money, so I don't recommend it for any category of gamer." In the July 1981 edition (Issue 41), David Ladyman was similarly unenthused with an updated version of the game, finding many problems with the rules. "Swordquest, in many ways, is a nice game, at a reasonable price. It is not too complex for the new gamer, at which it is primarily aimed. I wish I could recommend it. If you don't mind composing rules as you play, you might check it out."

In the August 1980 edition of Dragon (Issue 40), Tony Watson complained that the game setup and abilities of both sides had been so scrupulously balanced that "Both sides are too much the same. Adam the White [the good wizard] is no different from Shaymar [the evil sorcerer]. Each side uses the same spells; there is no diversity among 'good' and 'evil' magic. A similar situation exists with the game’s monsters... the only differences between them are their beginning combat levels and the number of wounds they can take; no unique qualities, no special abilities that could have easily added a lot to the game." Watson also noted that due to the movement rules and the fact that all hidden counters are in towns, "action concentrates around the towns and roads, ignoring the map’s considerable wilderness area."

In a retrospective review of Swordquest in Black Gate, John ONeill said "The inspiration for Swordquest — as with most fantasy boardgames of the era — was clearly J.R.R. Tolkien. The races of the kingdom of Tirrane consist of elves, dwarves, and giants, and there's also a powerful dragon and winged creatures named wrogs rather obviously inspired by Balrogs."

== Reviews ==
- Fantastic Science Fiction v27 n11
- The Dungeoneer #17
