= The Creature That Ate Sheboygan =

Science fiction board game

Back and front cover of 1st edition

The Creature That Ate Sheboygan is a science fiction board game released in 1979 by Simulations Publications (SPI). The game received good reviews and won an industry award.

== Gameplay ==
The Creature That Ate Sheboygan, designed by Greg Costikyan, is a two-player combat-oriented game. In the best traditions of Japanese kaiju, a monster is going to climb out of Lake Michigan and attack Sheboygan, Wisconsin. One player takes the role of the monster, and designs the monster's destructive abilities. The other player takes the role of the police, fire fighters and military units that will be used to try to protect the city and destroy the monster.

The players can choose several scenarios to enact. Every time the monster destroys a building or eliminates a human, it gains victory points. If the monster accrues the number of victory points called for in the scenario, the monster wins. If the humans destroy the monster before it reaches this threshold, the humans win.

The game comes with a rectangular grid map of the town, a set of rules and tables, and a counter sheet. The counters included markers for police, fire fighters, military and unarmed civilians. There are several different monster counters, as well as damage and fire markers.

== Publication history ==
In 1977, Metagaming Concepts published Ogre and pioneered the concept of the microgame—a cheap, small, quick wargame packaged in a Ziplock bag or small flat box. By 1979, SPI was in financial distress as interest in its traditional big box wargames waned, and the company decided to tap into the microgame market, publishing a number of "Capsule" games in various genres, including four science fiction-themed "Space Capsule" games. "Space Capsule #1", titled The Creature That Ate Sheboygan, was designed by Greg Costikyan, with graphic design by Redmond A. Simonsen and illustrations by . SPI released it packaged in a ziplock bag in March 1979, and it proved very popular, debuting at #4 in SPI's Top Ten Best Selling Games List. Two months later, it rose to #1 and remain SPI's #1 or #2 best-selling game for the next year.

SPI also released the game as a boxed set in 1979. Simpubs, SPI's British subsidiary, released it as a boxed set in the UK with new cover art. In 1985, Encore published a Polish-language version of the game, Ratuj swoje miasto (Save Your Town) in Poland.

In 1982, TSR took over SPI, and added several SPI titles to their own catalogue, including The Creature That Ate Sheboygan.

Costikyan sued TSR in 1992 in the US District Court in New York, claiming that he was the legal owner of all rights to the game, and alleging that they had stolen the game, and when they added the game to their catalog they republished it without his permission and removed his name, stating that it was created by a staff member of TSR. The next year, his lawyers discontinued the suit without prejudice, with Costikyan declaring he wanted TSR to revert the rights to all his games, while TSR claimed they obtained the rights legally and wanted Costikyan to pay for them.

== Reception ==
In the November 1979 edition of Dragon, Karl Merris liked the fact that the game was simple—only four pages of rules—and yet "This simplicity of game mechanics allows play to proceed quickly, often at breathtaking speed. Most scenarios can be played to completion in an hour or less. Yet despite its simplicity, the game is challenging and interesting." The one weakness of the game Merris noted was when the monster was given a fire-breath weapon, for which there was no defense. Despite this, Merris recommended the game: "The Creature that Ate Sheboygan is a cleverly conceived, well-produced little game. It provides excellent opportunity for you to let your most monstrous fantasies run riot. Buy it, play it and enjoy it."

In the first issue of Ares Magazine, Eric Goldberg lauded The Creature that Ate Sheboygan, rating it a 9 out of 9 and saying, "Since Creature even appeals to non-gamers, no one should be without a copy.".

In the 1980 book The Complete Book of Wargames, game designer Jon Freeman called the game "inexpensive and eminently playable." He did find some ambiguities in the rules about fires, but concluded by giving the game an Overall Evaluation of "Very Good", saying, "It really is as much fun as it appears, particularly if your monster is equipped with fire-breathing. Closet pyromaniacs will go wild [...] If you don't take your wargaming too seriously, this is more fun than seeing the movie."

Ken Rolston reviewed The Creature That Ate Sheboygan in White Wolf #43 (May, 1994) and stated that "The humor of this game is all in the play. The rules rely on dead-pan, format wargame chatter about line-of-sight, case-format references [...] and Combat Resolution Tables. Nonetheless, fans of Japanese monster moves instinctively dramatize the game; I always wave my head around and trumpet triumphantly after I gobble up hapless National Guardsmen and scream piteously in my death throes."

In a retrospective review in Issue 4 of Simulacrum, Brian Train noted, "This is one you will want to play once you get your hands on a copy [...] Very straightforward but worthy of repeated plays." Train concluded with the comment "I have found that usually the human player tends to win, unless the monster is allowed the 'fire-breathing' special ability, so players should play one match and then switch roles."

== Awards ==
At the 1980 Origins Awards, The Creature that Ate Sheboygan won the Charles S. Roberts Award for Best Fantasy or Science Fiction Game of 1979.

== Other reviews ==
- 1981 Games 100 in Games
- Games & Puzzles #81
- The Courier-Journal
