= Greg Costikyan =

American game designer (born 1969)

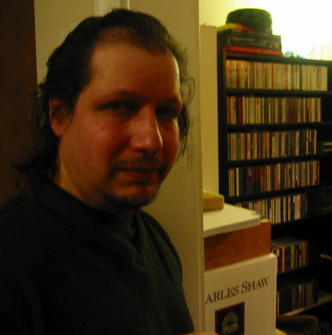
- Costikyan in 2006
- Born: July 22, 1959 (age 67); New York City, U.S.
- Education: Brown University (BS)
- Occupations: Game designer, science fiction writer
- Spouse: Louise Disbrow (m. 1986)
- Children: 3
- Relatives: Edward N. Costikyan (father)
- Writing career
- Pen name: Designer X
- Genre: Role-playing games

Greg Costikyan (born July 22, 1959), sometimes known under the pseudonym Designer X, is an American game designer and science fiction writer. Costikyan's career spans nearly all extant genres of gaming, including: hex-based wargames, role-playing games, boardgames, card games, computer games, online games, and mobile games. Several of his games have won Origins Awards. He co-founded Manifesto Games, now out of business, with Johnny Wilson in 2005.

== Personal life and education ==
Greg Costikyan was born in New York Hospital in Lenox Hill, Manhattan. The son of attorney and politician Edward N.Costikyan and Frances (Holmgren) Costikyan. He and game designer Warren Spector were friends since high school. He is a 1982 graduate (B.S.) of Brown University. He married Louise Disbrow (a securities analyst), September 4, 1986. They have three children and live in Battery Park City, Manhattan. He is a frequent speaker at game industry events including the Game Developers Conference and E³.

== Career ==
Greg Costikyan has been a game designer since the 1970s. Costikyan worked at SPI until it was closed by TSR in 1982; he came to West End Games in 1983. His 1983 game Bug-Eyed Monsters brought West End Games into the science-fiction and fantasy genres, and the following year he licensed his Paranoia role-playing game to West End Games for publishing after trying unsuccessfully to find a publisher. Costikyan designed Toon (1984) for Steve Jackson Games after developing it from an idea suggested by Jeff Dee; Costikyan felt that the game system was mostly "arbitrary" and that the theme of the game was far more important. West End Games acquired licensing to make a game based on Star Wars, and Costikyan designed Star Wars: The Roleplaying Game, published in 1987, assisted by Doug Kaufman and others.

Costikyan and Eric Goldberg left West End Games in January 1987, forming the short-lived Goldberg Associates. When West End Games declared bankruptcy in 1998, Costikyan and Goldberg tried to recover the rights to Paranoia; although West End's founder Scott Palter tried to fight this, a judge gave the rights back to the creators in 2000. Costikyan designed the role-playing game Violence (1999) under the pseudonym "Designer X" for Hogshead Publishing, and made sure that the game would be widely available by releasing it under a Creative Commons license. Costikyan and Goldberg licensed Paranoia to Mongoose Publishing, which began producing new books for the game in 2004.

Costikyan was the CEO of Manifesto Games, a start-up devoted to providing a viable path to market for independently developed computer games. He subsequently worked as a consultant for several years before joining Guerillapps as lead game designer in March 2010 to develop its game Trash Tycoon for Facebook. In May 2011, he joined Disney Playdom as senior games designer and in January 2014 assumed the same role at Loop Drop. In June 2015, Costikyan joined Boss Fight Entertainment as senior games designer.

He has written on games, game design, and game industry business issues for publications including The New York Times, the Wall Street Journal, Salon, The Escapist, Gamasutra, and the magazine Game Developer.

He has lectured on game design at universities including the IT University of Copenhagen, Helsinki University of Art & Design (now part of Aalto University), Rensselaer Polytechnic Institute, and Stony Brook University.

In 2019, Costikyan and Goldberg joined Playable Worlds, a startup founded by Raph Koster focused on producing the massively multiplayer online role-playing game Stars Reach.

== Games ==
Costikyan's notable works include:

- Web and Starship (1984, a starships combat science fiction board game)
- Toon (1984, a humor role-playing game)
- Star Wars: The Roleplaying Game (Origins Award Winner for Best Role-playing Rules of 1987)
- Pax Britannica (Charles S. Roberts Award Winner for Best Pre-20th Century Game of 1985)
- Paranoia (Origins Award Winner for Best Roleplaying Rules of 1984)
- The Creature That Ate Sheboygan (Charles S. Roberts Award Winner for Best Fantasy or Science Fiction Game of 1979)
- MadMaze
- Violence: The Roleplaying Game of Egregious and Repulsive Bloodshed
- The Price of Freedom (1986)

Costikyan's other RPG credits include Acute Paranoia (1986) for Paranoia, and Your Own Private Idaho (1987) for The Price of Freedom.

In addition, Costikyan is a widely published author on the subject of game design and the role of games in culture. His essay "I Have No Words and I Must Design" is widely read as a conceptual approach to framing game design.

Costikyan worked on game design for many years, including writing and consulting for Nokia. In September 2005, he left Nokia to join with Johnny Wilson, former editor of Computer Gaming World, in founding the startup indie game publisher Manifesto Games. He regularly contributed to the now defunct Manifesto Games' website, and was editor in chief of their now defunct offshoot game review blog Play This Thing.

Costikyan was a player of the play-by-mail game Slobbovia. His novel One Quest, Hold the Dragons includes several stories about "crottled greeps", a Slobbovian meme.

In 1997, he designed the video game Evolution: The Game of Intelligent Life.

In February 2009, Costikyan updated the rules and re-released his 1979 space combat game, Vector 3, under a Creative Commons license as a free PDF download.

== Books ==
Costikyan has written four novels. The first two were parodies of genre fantasy: Another Day, Another Dungeon (1990, ISBN 0-8125-0140-3) and its sequel One Quest, Hold the Dragons (1995, ISBN 0-8125-2269-9). By the Sword (1993, ISBN 0-312-85489-7) is another irreverent fantasy about a young barbarian who is forced by circumstances to make his way in the larger world; it was originally serialized on the Prodigy online service.

His latest novel, First Contract (in French : Space O.P.A. - 2000, ISBN 0-312-87396-4), depicts (with much dry humor) the vast sociological and economic changes that happen after aliens arrive on Earth, and one entrepreneur's efforts to survive and make a new start.

In 2013, Costikyan's non-fiction look at the role of uncertainty in game development Uncertainty in Games was published by MIT Press. A paperback edition was subsequently published in 2015. ISBN 9780262527538.

== Awards and recognition ==
Costikyan is the winner of five Origins Awards. On March 7, 2007, Costikyan received the Game Developers Choice Awards Maverick Award. The award was given for his tireless efforts to create a viable channel for indie games. He was inducted into the Adventure Gaming Hall of Fame in 1999.
