= 1980 in games =

This page lists board and card games, wargames, miniatures games, and tabletop role-playing games published in 1980. For video games, see 1980 in video gaming.

== Games released or invented in 1980 ==
- Ace of Aces
- Across Suez
- Annihilator & One World
- Apocalypse
- Arena of Death
- Artifact
- Asteroid
- Azhanti High Lightning
- Barbarian Kings
- Basic Role-Playing (role-playing game system)
- Beachhead
- Berlin '85
- Can't Stop
- Car Wars
- Citadel of Blood
- Civilization
- Dark Nebula
- Death and Destruction
- Deathmaze
- Devil's Den
- Doctor Who: The Game of Time & Space
- DragonQuest (role-playing game)
- Duel Arcane
- Empire Builder
- Empires of the Middle Ages
- Engage & Destroy
- Fifth Corps
- Final Frontier
- Forest Wars of the Haven
- Fast Attack Boats
- The Hammer of Thor: The Game of Norse Mythology
- Hero
- Hof Gap
- Intruder
- Journey
- King of the Mountain
- Kings & Castles
- Knights and Magick
- Land of the Rising Sun (role-playing game)
- Laser Tank
- The Longest Day
- The Morrow Project (role-playing game)
- The Mystic Wood
- Mythology
- Odysseus (role-playing game)
- O.K. Corral
- Panzer Pranks
- Quirks
- Raid on Iran
- Ram Speed
- Revolt on Antares
- Robots!
- Rolemaster (role-playing game)
- Rommel's Panzers
- Shooting Stars
- Skull & Crossbones (role-playing game)
- The Sorcerer's Cave Extension Kit
- Space Opera (role-playing game)
- Space Warrior
- Spellbinder
- Star Commandos
- Starfire II
- Swashbuckler
- Tau Ceti 2015 AD
- Time Tripper
- Timelag
- Titan
- Top Secret (role-playing game)
- Trax
- Valkenburg Castle
- Valley of the Four Winds
- The War of the Worlds
- Warlock (card game)
- World of Greyhawk Fantasy World Setting
- The Wreck of the B.S.M. Pandora

== Games awards given in 1980 ==
- Spiel des Jahres: Rummikub

== Significant game-related events in 1980 ==
- FASA Corporation was founded by Jordan Weisman and L. Ross Babcock III.
- Iron Crown Enterprises was founded.
- Steve Jackson Games was founded by Steve Jackson.

== See also ==
- 1980 in video gaming
