= Cooperative board game =

Type of board game

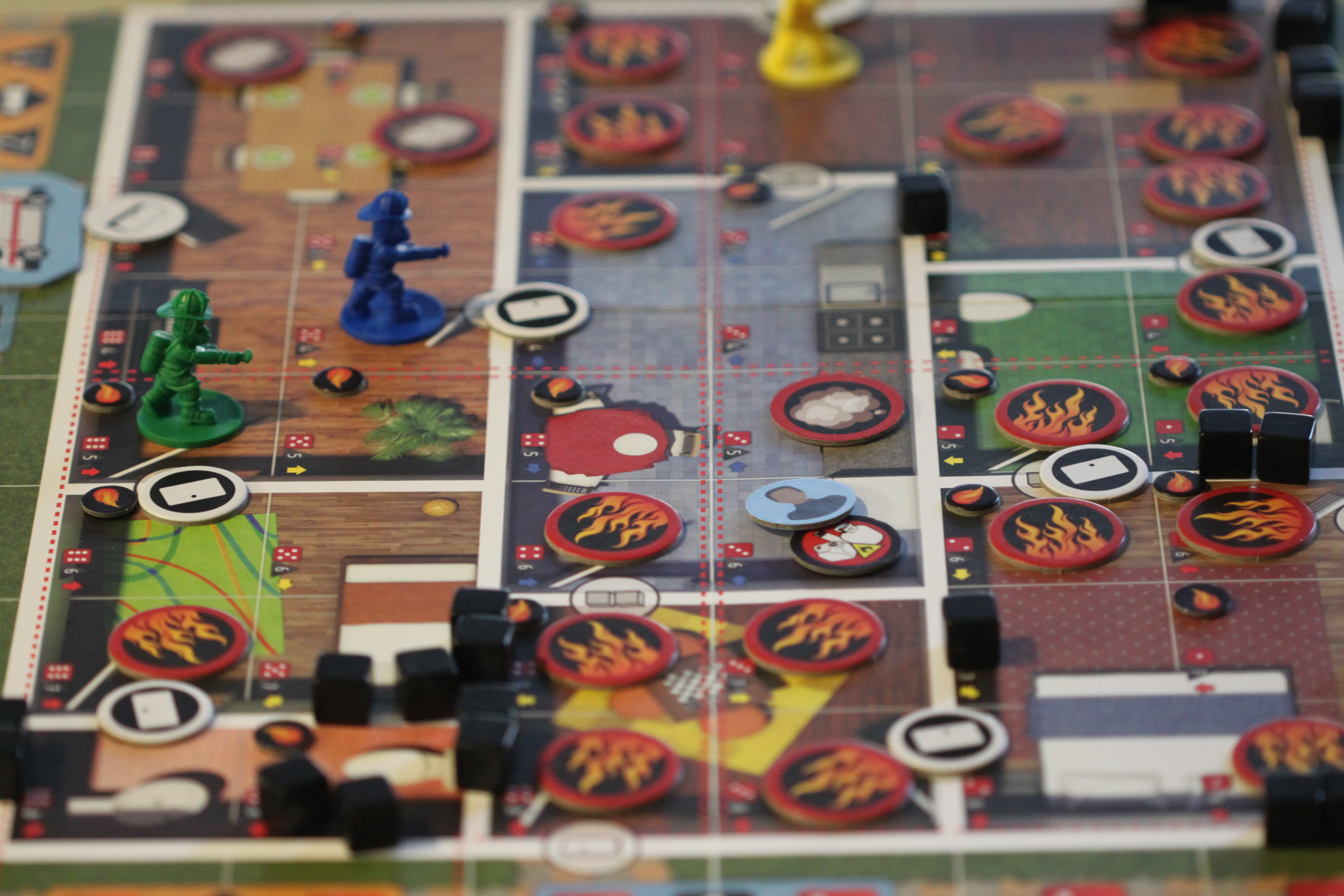
In the game Flash Point: Fire Rescue, players work together as a team of fire fighters entering a building to extinguish a blaze

Cooperative board games are board games in which players work together to achieve a common goal rather than competing against each other. Either the players win the game by reaching a predetermined objective, or all players lose the game, often by not reaching the objective before a certain event ends the game.

== Definition ==
In cooperative board games, all players win or lose the game together. These games should not be confused with noncompetitive games, such as The Ungame, which simply do not have victory conditions or any set objective to complete. While adventure board games with role playing and dungeon crawl elements like Gloomhaven may be included, pure tabletop role-playing games like Descent: Journeys in the Dark are excluded as they have potentially infinite victory conditions with persistent player characters. Furthermore, games in which players compete together in two or more groups, teams or partnerships (such as Axis & Allies, and card games like Bridge and Spades) fall outside of this definition, even though there is temporary cooperation between some of the players. Multiplayer conflict games like Diplomacy may also feature temporary cooperation during the course of the game. These games are not considered cooperative though, because players are eliminated and ultimately only one individual can win.

== History and development ==
=== 20th century ===
Early cooperative games were used by parents and teachers in educational settings. In 1903 Elizabeth Magie patented "The Landlord's Game", inspired by the principles and philosophy of Henry George. The Landlords' and designed as a protest against the monopolists of the time, the game is considered to be the game from which Monopoly was largely derived. In it, Magie had two rule-sets - the Monopoly rules, in which players all vied to accrue the largest revenue and crush their opponents, and a co-operative set. Her dualistic approach was a teaching tool meant to demonstrate that the co-operative rules were morally superior.

In 1954, a board game version of Beat the Clock, a game show, was released. In 1956, the Lowell Toy Manufacturing Corporation of New York City released a board game version of I've Got a Secret, a panel show, featuring host Garry Moore on the cover of the box.

Teacher Jim Deacove published the cooperative game Together in 1971. He founded Family Pastimes in 1972 in Perth, Ontario, focusing exclusively on cooperative games. Family Pastimes has published numerous cooperative games, having released over 100 board games including the popular game of Max the Cat. The company also holds the trademark for the phrase, "A co-operative game".

Ken Kolsbun and Jann Kolsbun founded Animal Town in 1976 in California. They invented cooperative games such as Save the Whales, Nectar Collector, and Dam Builders. Animal Town was renamed as Child and Nature in 2003.

During the 1980s, several cooperative games like The Wreck of the B.S.M. Pandora, Time Tripper, and Arkham Horror were published. In the Sherlock Holmes: Consulting Detective series of games published in the 1980s, players are presented with a mystery to solve, and they trace the evidence together. Many cooperative Adventure board game series with Role-playing elements like Citadel of Blood, HeroQuest, Wizards (board game), Advanced Heroquest, Deathmaze were released in this decade.

Minion Hunter is a board game originally released in 1992 by Game Designers' Workshop in conjunction with their Dark Conspiracy Role Playing Game. The game is designed to encourage the players to work together to stall and/or defeat the plans of four monster races as a primary goal, with the individual advancement of the players as a secondary objective. Star Trek: The Next Generation Interactive VCR Board Game is set in the Star Trek universe and released in 1993. It utilizes a video tape that runs constantly while users play the board game portion. Events on the video tape combine with board game play to determine whether users win or lose the game. The video itself was directed by Les Landau and contains original footage filmed on the actual Star Trek: The Next Generation sets at Paramount Studios. Warhammer Quest is a fantasy dungeon, role-playing adventure board game released by Games Workshop in 1995 as the successor to HeroQuest and Advanced Heroquest, set in its fictional Warhammer Fantasy world.

=== 21st century ===
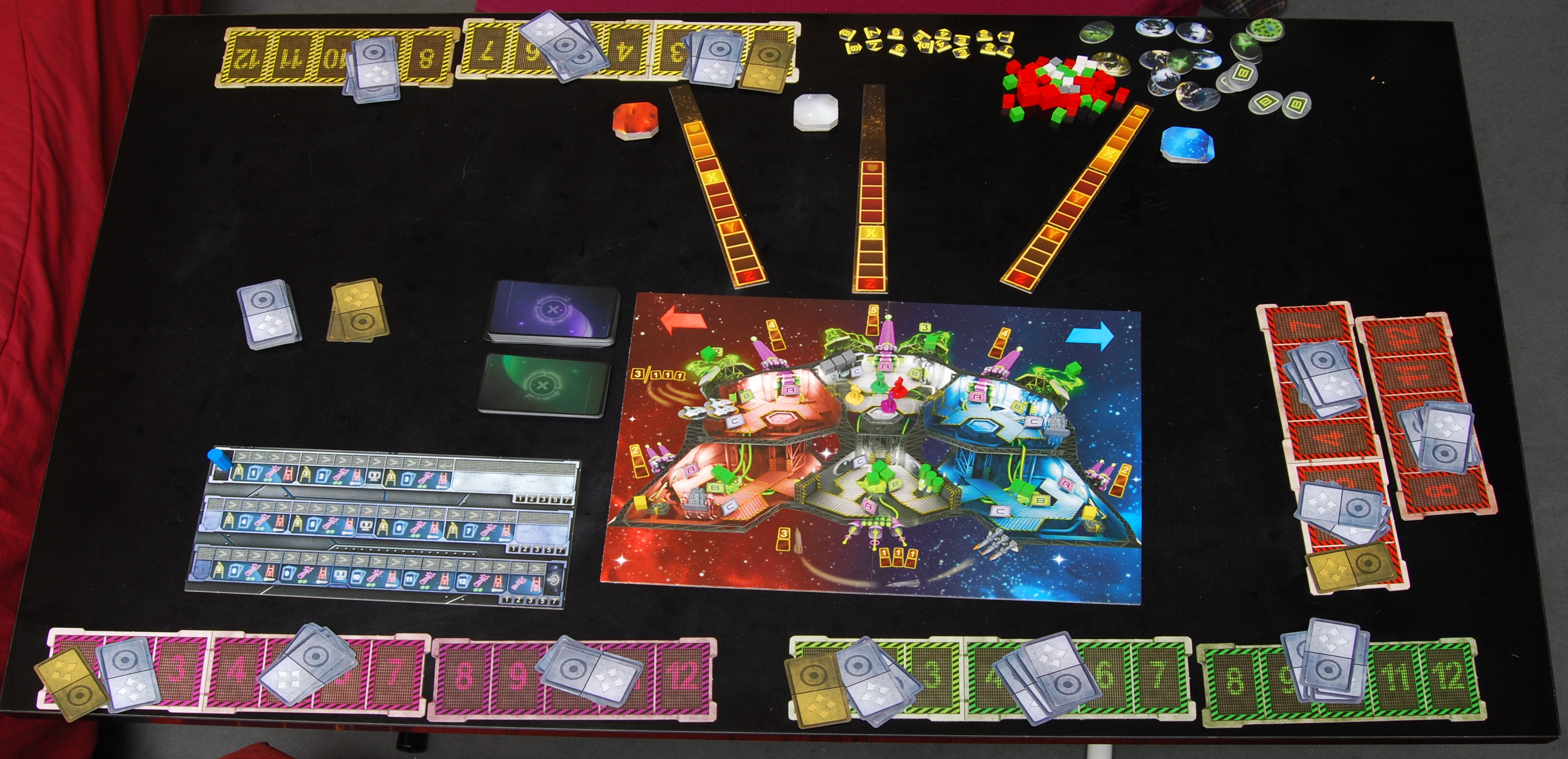
Space Alert board game components

In 2000, Reiner Knizia released Lord of the Rings a cooperative board game that allowed players to work together against the forces of Sauron. This influenced several later cooperative titles, including Shadows over Camelot. Pandemic, designed by Matt Leacock was first published by Z-Man Games in the United States in 2008. In this game, players join forces as medical experts racing to stop the spread of global diseases. In the same year, Space Alert; a cooperative survival designer board game created by Vlaada Chvátil in 2008 was released. Players assume the roles of space explorers on a mission to survey the galaxy. The game places emphasis on teamwork as the crew deals with emergencies, such as system malfunctions and alien threats. The crew is evaluated on teamwork and how they deal with problems that arise on their journey.

Other cooperative games from subsequent years include :

- Star Trek: Expeditions (2011): Designed by Reiner Knizia, players join the crew of the USS Enterprise on cooperative missions based on the Star Trek universe.
- Sentinels of the Multiverse (2011): A superhero card game where each player controls a hero with a distinct deck, fighting together to overcome powerful villains.
- Flash Point: Fire Rescue (2011): Designed by Kevin Lanzing with the help of firefighters, the objective is for players to play as firefighters work together to rescue people and animals from a burning building before it collapses.
- Robinson Crusoe: Adventures on the Cursed Island (2012): A survival-themed board game inspired by Daniel Defoe’s novel, emphasizing resource management and story-driven scenarios.
- Freedom: The Underground Railroad (2012): A historical strategy game that places players in the roles of abolitionists helping enslaved people escape to freedom in the 19th century.
- Zombicide (2012 and onward): A popular franchise featuring cooperative play against hordes of zombies, often with miniatures and scenario-based campaigns.
- Hanabi (2013): A cooperative card game about creating a perfect fireworks display by providing limited information to one another. It won the Spiel des Jahres award in 2013, highlighting its clever use of deduction.
- Burgle Bros (2015 and onward): A series of cooperative games where players work together to complete a heist.
- Mechs vs. Minions (2016): A programmable movement game based on the "League of Legends" universe, where players control mech pilots facing waves of minions.,
- Spirit Island (2017): Players become powerful spirits defending their island home from invading colonists, each spirit having distinct powers and playstyles.
- The 7th Continent (2017): A narrative exploration game where players attempt to lift a terrible curse by venturing through a modular, mysterious continent.

Gloomhaven is a cooperative board game for 1 to 4 players designed by Isaac Childres and published by Cephalofair Games in 2017, expanded the dungeon-crawl style of cooperative gameplay. It is a campaign-based dungeon crawl game with a branching narrative campaign, 95 unique playable scenarios, 17 playable classes, and more than 1,500 cards in a box which weighs almost 10 kilograms (22 lb). Gloomhaven was selected by both a jury and fans as the Origins Game Fair Best Board Game of 2018. As of early August 2018, it had sold about 120,000 copies. It has also maintained a top position in board game rankings, reflecting its popularity and influence. Frosthaven, a successor to Gloomhaven, also by Isaac Childres. It adds new character classes, a seasonal event system, settlement-building mechanics, and many more scenarios. Players cooperate to face dangerous creatures and shape the story of a harsh northern outpost. The Crew: The Quest for Planet Nine (2019), Forgotten Waters (2020), Sleeping Gods (2021), Return to Dark Tower (2022) are some other popular recent cooperative games.

== Characteristics ==
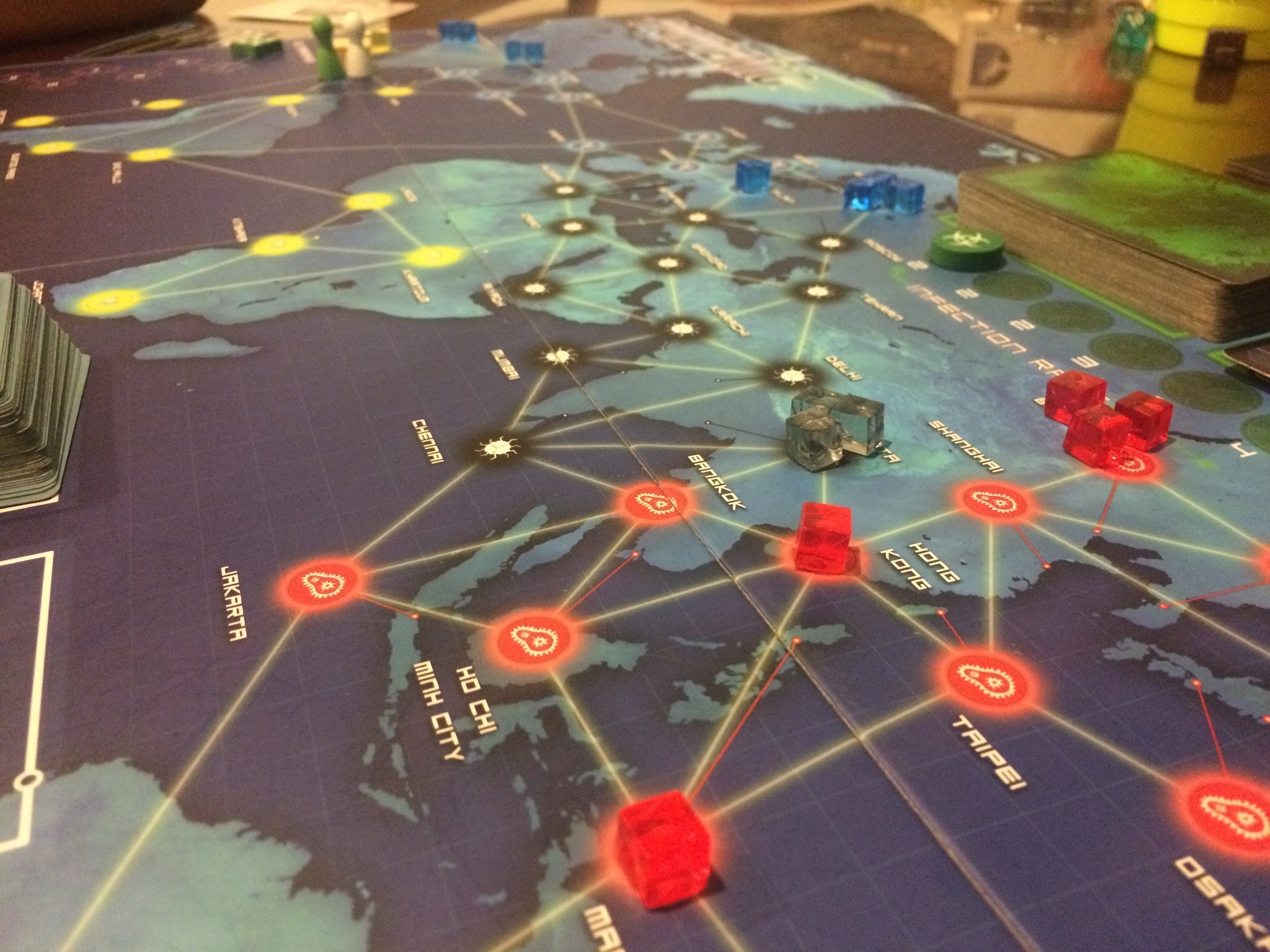
In the 2008 board game Pandemic, players work together to diminish outbreaks of disease cubes from a map of the world

In José P. Zagal, Jochen Rick, and Idris Hsi's "Collaborative games: Lessons learned from board games", the lessons the researchers learned highlight what makes a good cooperative board game.

- First, the game needs to point out the folly of being competitive by allowing players to make decisions that benefits themselves rather than the whole group.
- Second, each player should not need the input of the rest of the group when making a decision.
- Third, players need to be able to identify what actions had benefits or consequences.
- Fourth, the game should reward selfless players by giving players unique roles or traits.

These researchers also point out Challenges in designing collaborative games due to the following pitfalls that must be overcome:

- Game degenerating into a single player decides the actions for everyone
- For a game to be engaging, players should be invested in the end result and winning the game should be satisfying
- For repeat play, game experience should vary and challenge needs to evolve

=== Game as the opponent ===
Participants typically play against the game. Cooperative board games generally involve players joining forces against the game itself, and can be played without any player in the role of the opposition or Gamemaster. In Pandemic, for example, players work together to stop and cure different strains of diseases.

Also, in some cooperative games, players actually cooperate with the opposing forces in the game. For example, in Max the Cat, players are mice who keep an aggressive cat at bay by offering him milk and other appeasements. In this way, all participants in the conflict scenario are fulfilled and the resolution is truly cooperative or "win-win".

=== Randomness ===
In many contemporary cooperative games, randomizing devices help in varying game experience over multiple plays. Dice can be rolled, cards can be drawn each turn from a shuffled deck or various board sections of a modular board revealed to generate random objectives, events and challenges. These provide the conflict or challenge in the game, and make it progressively more difficult for the players. For example, in Save the Whales, players work together to protect whales from the challenges inherent in the game setting—radioactive waste, commercial whaling, etc.

=== Cooperation and its variations ===
Most cooperative games bestow different abilities or responsibilities upon the players incentivizing cooperation. Some cooperative games might have an added layer of intrigue by giving players personal win conditions. In Dead of Winter: A Cross Roads Game, a zombie apocalypse game, in order to win players must achieve the communal victory condition and a personal objective. Gloomhaven is a cooperative board game for 1 to 4 players designed by Isaac Childres and published by Cephalofair Games in 2017 where each player also has a personal objective.

==== Opposing teams ====
In some games, there are opposing teams whose members cooperate with one another, working together against the other teams. Such teams may have equal or unequal number of players, in some cases taking the format of "one versus all". For example, in Scotland Yard and The Fury of Dracula, one player controls the "enemy", while the other players are cooperating to locate and defeat said enemy.

==== Traitor ====
A traitor game or semi-cooperative game can be seen as a cooperative game with a betrayal mechanism. While, as in a standard cooperative game, the majority of players work towards a common goal, one or more players are secretly assigned to be traitors who win if the other player fail. Determining the identity of traitors is often central to such games. For example, in Battlestar Galactica: The Board Game, players secretly designated as Cylons can usually be more effective if the human players are unaware who they are, and can profit from the human players suspecting each other. Other games, like Betrayal at House on the Hill, start out fully cooperative, but assigns a player to be the villain mid-game.

== See also ==
- Cooperative game theory (in mathematical game theory)
- Cooperative gameplay (in video games)
- Eurogame
- Amerigame
- Board wargame
- Party game
- Win–win game
