= The Seventh Continent =

The Seventh Continent or 7th Continent can refer to:

- The Seventh Continent (1966 film), a 1966 Croatian film
- The Seventh Continent (1989 film), a 1989 Austrian film
- Sedmoi Kontinent, a grocery retail chain in Russia
- The 7th Continent, a 2017 board game

== See also ==
- Antarctica: The Battle for the Seventh Continent, a 2016 book by Doaa Abdel-Motaal
