= Decline and Fall of the Roman Empire (game) =

1972 board wargame

Original WRG edition, 1972

Decline and Fall of the Roman Empire, originally titled Decline and Fall: The Game of the Barbarian Invasions, is a board game published by Wargames Research Group (WRG) in 1972 in which 4th-century Rome struggles against invading barbarians.

== Contents ==
Decline and Fall of the Roman Empire is a 4-player game in which one player takes the role of Rome and tries to maintain control of its lands, while the other three players control the Huns, the Goths and the Vandals. The mounted hex grid map shows the Roman Empire in 375 AD, which is when the game starts.

Each player, on their turn, moves, engages in combat and moves again. A full game turn, when all four players have completed a turn, represents five years in game time. The game ends after fifteen turns. The more territory the Goths and Vandals occupy, the more fighters they recruit to their cause. The Huns gather more recruits via destruction of cities and other units. Once per game, each player can make an "Appeal to the Gods", roll a die and consult a chart to see the result. Although some of the results are miraculous, others are devastating. As critic William Davies commented, "Used by desperate players in a bad situation."

=== Victory conditions ===
The player with the most victory points at the end of the game wins. The Roman player accumulates victory points for saving their cities from destruction or invasion. The Goths and Vandals get victory points for looting Roman cities, and for the number of hexes they settle on by the end of the game. The Huns gather points for destroying other units (including Goths and Vandals) and for looting cities. The player with the most victory points at the end of the game is the winner.

== Publication history ==
The game was created by Canadian game designer Terrence Peter Donnelly (who also created Mystic Wood and Sorcerer's Cave). After a period of playtesting, Donnelly produced a test edition in 1972, and sent it to several game companies. UK company WRG thought the game had potential, and published it in 1972 with the title Decline and Fall: The Game of the Barbarian Invasions. It was republished by Ariel Productions in 1977 retitled Decline and Fall of the Roman Empire.

== Reception ==
In Issue 14 of the UK magazine Games & Puzzles, William Davies found it to be "an absorbing and well-researched board game." He concluded, "this is a well produced game of infinite variety, allowing both skill in strategy and the full exercise of diplomatic ingenuity and double dealing — a game which can be both challenging and hilarious." Several issues later, Bob O'Brien did an in-depth analysis of the game, and concluded "This is a game that can be played at many levels and can be enjoyed by all ages — it combines manoeuvre, diplomatic skill, role-playing, some insight into the history of the time — and great fun as well."

In a 1976 poll carried out by Simulations Publications Inc. to determine the most popular board wargames in North America, Decline and Fall placed a disappointing 137th out of 202 games.

In the 1977 book The Comprehensive Guide to Board Wargaming, Nicholas Palmer states that "this is disliked by experts because of its elementary rules and unbalanced structure, but it is a highly entertaining game for four players, if it's not taken too seriously."

In The Guide to Simulations/Games for Education and Training, Martin Campion discussed using this game as an educational aid, saying, "I have used this game in several classes and it has always proved fascinating and suggestive. I have used it with individuals or with teams representing the various sides. The game gives a good idea of the chaos of the period represented."

== Reviews ==
- Moves #4, p14
- Games & Puzzles #52
