= Across Suez =

1980 Middle East wargame

- Designers: Mark Herman; Jim Dunnigan
- Illustrators: Redmond Simonsen
- Publishers: SPI
- Publication: 1980
- Genres: Middle East

Across Suez, subtitled "The Battle of the Chinese Farm, October 15, 1973" is a board wargame published by Simulations Publications (SPI) in 1980 that simulates operational level ground combat between Egypt and Israel at the Battle of the Chinese Farm during the 1973 Arab-Israeli War.

== Background ==
During the Arab-Israeli War of October 1973, Israeli forces tried to open a bridgehead over the Suez Canal to exploit a perceived gap in the Egyptian line, and instead ran up against a strong force. The battle took place in the vicinity of an Egyptian research station that used Japanese equipment. Israeli observers mistook the Japanese Kanji characters on the machinery for Chinese Hanzi, leading to the misnomer "The Chinese Farm".

== Description ==
Across Suez is a introductory-level simulation where one player controls Israeli forces while the other player controls Egyptian forces.

=== Components ===
- 11 in × 17 in (280 mm × 430 mm) paper hex grid map
- 40 die-cut counters
- 8-page rules booklet
- various playing aids
- a six-sided die
- small 9 in × 12 in × 1 in (229 mm × 305 mm × 25 mm) game box

=== Gameplay ===
Each turn represent 8 hours of game time, and takes the following sequence:

1. Israeli movement
2. Israeli combat
3. Egyptian movement
4. Egyptian combat

The game lasts seven turns.

=== Victory conditions ===
Israeli victory: The Israeli player must

- place a bridging unit on a specific hex on the Suez Canal
- move a minimum of six combat units across the Suez
- maintain an unblocked line of communications to the bridging unit at the end of the last turn

Egyptian victory: Prevent any of the Israeli victory conditions.

== Publication history ==
In 1980, SPI published four "gateway" games in small boxes with simplified rules, intended to introduce new players to the wargaming hobby: Leningrad; The Big Red One (originally titled Bulge); The Battle of Austerlitz ; and Across Suez, the latter designed by Jim Dunnigan and Mark Herman, with cartography and graphic design by Redmond A. Simonsen.

After SPI went out of business, Decision Games acquired the license for Across Suez and republished it in 1995. Decision added two variants (airborne landings and amphibious landings) and two new scenarios, which required 16 additional Arab and Israeli counters and 18 Soviet and American counters.

Hobby Japan published a Japanese version.

== Reception ==
In Issue 5 of Casus Belli, Henri Gregoire thought that the rules "reflect the surprise and shock of the first fight." He agreed this was a good game for beginners, pointing out that with only seven turns, the game was quick, and could be completed in two hours.

In Issue 5 of Zone of Control, Rick D. Stuart found the game to be "no frills", but gave it grades of "Good" for gameplay and "Fair" for historicity, saying, "Across Suez, with its fluid movement and numerous attack options — on both sides — makes for a solid game that is easily mastered. The game as a whole has exceptional replay value."

== Other reviews and commentary ==
- Campaign #102
- Paper Wars #24
- Richard Berg's Review of Games #7
