= Space Warriors =

Space Warriors may refer to:

- Space Warriors (2013 film)
- Space Warrior (board game)
- Space Warrior Baldios, a 1980 Japanese anime television series and a 1981 anime feature film of the same title
- The Space Warriors, a 1980 short story collection by Stewart Cowley
- "Space Warriors", episode 16 of Thunderbirds 2086 (1982)
- Space Warriors 2000, the American alternative title of Hanuman vs. 11 Ultraman, a 1984 re-edited localization of the 1974 film The 6 Ultra Brothers vs. the Monster Army
- "Space Warrior The☆Lukeman" (宇宙戦士ザ☆ルークメン, "Uchū Senshi Za☆Rūkumen"), episode 15 of the second season of Yu-Gi-Oh! Sevens (2021)

== See also ==
- "The Warriors from Outer Space", episode 42 of the first season of Monster Rancher (2000)
- Space warfare
- Spacewar (disambiguation)
