= The Longest Day =

The Longest Day may refer to:

- The "D-Day" invasion of Normandy during World War II

== Art, entertainment, and media ==
- The Longest Day (book), 1959 book by Cornelius Ryan
  - The Longest Day (film), a 1962 war film based on Ryan's book
- Japan's Longest Day, a Japanese 1967 war film on the surrender of Japan in World War II
- The Longest Day (game), a 1980 wargame by Avalon Hill
- "The Longest Day" (Dawson's Creek), a 2000 television episode
- "The Longest Day" (Land of the Lost), a 1975 television episode
- Longest Day (novel), a 1998 novel by Michael Collier set in the Doctor Who universe
- The Longest Day (album), 1984 album by the Del Fuegos
- "The Longest Day", a song by Iron Maiden from A Matter of Life and Death (2006)
- "Longest Day", a song by Soulsavers from The Light the Dead See (2012)

== Other uses ==
- The Longest Day (race), a 24-hour sports and touring car endurance race
- "The longest day", a 25-hour day that occurs once a year due to daylight saving time
- The summer solstice, the "longest day" of the year since it has the most daylight

== See also ==
- Long Day (disambiguation)
