= Leningrad: The Advance of Army Group North, Summer 1941 =

Board wargame published in 1980

Leningrad
- Designers: Dick Ruskin
- Illustrators: Redmond A. Simonsen
- Publishers: Simulations Publications Inc.
- Publication: 1980
- Genres: WWII

Leningrad: The Advance of Army Group North, Summer 1941 is a board wargame published by Simulations Publications Inc. (SPI) in 1980 that simulates the German drive on Leningrad during Operation Barbarossa in World War II, and the Soviet attempt to prevent a quick German victory. Although the game received good critical reception as a relatively simple game that could be an entry point for new wargamers, it was not a bestseller for SPI.

== Background ==
When Germany launched Operation Barbarossa, its surprise attack against the Soviet Union, in September 1941, Army Group North was given the task of quickly taking Leningrad, which would deprive the Soviet Union of an important Baltic port. Although the initial advance by German armored divisions was swift, they were forced to stop short of their objective, having both raced ahead of their supporting infantry and overextended their supply lines. By the time the advance restarted, the Soviets had been given enough time to build almost impregnable defenses, and the Germans' hopes of a quick victory were dashed as the blitzkrieg attack was turned into a lengthy siege.

== Description ==
Leningrad is a two-player board wargame where one player controls the German forces and the other player controls Soviet forces. The German player is trying to overcome history by successfully taking control of Leningrad in only 12 weeks, while the Soviet player is trying to emulate history by stopping the Germans short of their objective. The Soviets start with a few untried units on the board, but receive many reinforcements and the ability to build fortifications in the latter half of the game.

=== Setup ===
The entire German starting force begins stacked on three hexes on the edge of the map. The two city hexes the German player must control by the end of Turn 12 are on the opposite edge of the board.

=== Gameplay ===
The game system is based on the system used in a previous SPI publication, Panzergruppe Guderian, and uses a simple "I Go, You Go" alternating turn format, with German movement and combat, followed by Soviet movement and combat. This completes one game turn, which represents one week of game time. The game ends after twelve turns.

All German units can take an intermediate step of damage before being eliminated. All Soviet units are eliminated the first time they are damaged.

=== Untried units ===
Like PanzerGruppe Guderian, all Soviet units are "untried" and thus their combat effectiveness is unknown. The Soviet units of each type are randomly shuffled and placed on the map facedown. Neither player is aware of each Soviet unit's combat strength until the unit is engaged in combat and flipped over to reveal its strength.

=== Victory conditions ===
The Soviet player receives Victory Points for damaging or eliminating German units. The German player receives Victory Points for crossing the Neva River and occupying two hexes of central Leningrad with supplied units by the end of the last turn. The player with the most points is the winner.

== Publication history ==
In the late 1970s, many of SPI's offerings were highly complex "monster" wargames with thousands of counters that took many hours to play, like Wacht am Rhein and The Next War. In 1977, rival company Game Designers' Workshop, also known for monster wargames, released their "Series 120", small wargames with only 120 counters that could be played in 120 minutes or less. In 1980, SPI followed suit with four small wargames: Bulge (also published as The Big Red One), The Battle of Austerlitz ; Across Suez, and Leningrad. The latter was designed by Dick Ruskin, with graphic design by Redmond A. Simonsen. Leningrad was not a popular product, and failed to make SPI's Top Ten Bestseller List after it was published.

After the demise of SPI, Hobby Japan acquired the rights to the game and published it, together with two other SPI titles, The Big Red One and Across Suez, in a Japanese-language collection titled Basic 3. The box cover featured artwork by Rodger B. MacGowan.

In 1994, Decision Games acquired the rights to Leningrad: The Advance of Army Group North, Summer 1941 and reprinted it with the original map, counters and rulebook. In 2013, Decision revised the rules, redrew the map and provided new counter designs, and published this second edition under the shortened title Leningrad.

== Reception ==
In Issue 45 of the British wargaming magazine Perfidious Albion, Charles Vasey commented, "Given the terrain and units, some kind of perfect plan is doubtless possible but once again the positional players will enjoy this."

In Issue 50 of Moves, Steve List noted that the attack on Leningrad was "One of the least popular subjects" for wargames to that point in time. List called Leningrad "a game of limited scope", noting that the German player "must break out, destroy virtually every Soviet unit he faces, and race the length of the map to reach Leningrad in time to seize it before Soviet reinforcements and forts make it impregnable. To merely duplicate the feats of the historical campaign is to lose." Noting the almost impossible set of objectives the German player must fulfill, List added, "To this extent, the game is frustrating. A magnificent Blitzkrieg is meaningless; it must lead to the fall of the city, generally accomplished by a frontal assault." List thought the game was essentially unbalanced in favor of the Soviets, since "The German must win two games, the Blitz portion and the later assault, while the Russian need only win once, for if the Blitz fails, the assault has no chance." List concluded, "Given the victory conditions, the game will probably produce a cliff hanger almost every time, unless the Soviet wins early."

In Issue 26 of the UK wargaming magazine Phoenix, R.M.W. Musson called Leningrad "excellent fun" but noted "if the German player sends the speedy panzers on ahead of the infantry, they may arrive at the suburbs of a fortified and well-defended city, reduced and out of supply, and quite unable to take the vital hexes. It is not enough for the German to do well, he must do brilliantly." Musson concluded, "quick acting and playable in around two hours or so. An excellent antidote to Monster [game] indigestion!"

In 2007, almost thirty years after Leningrad's publication, Matt Irsik reviewed the reprinting of the original game of Leningrad by Decision Games, and noted that this was not a subject that had been covered by many other wargames, except as "the northern part of larger scenarios and it quickly becomes a sideshow. With this game you get to see how the Russians threw themselves at the Germans at the opening of the campaign, then watch the Germans chew up huge sections of Northern Russia, then see the Russians desperately dig in around the city of Leningrad." Irsik thought the game almost always provided a cliffhanger ending, saying, "The final few turns see a desperate struggle by both sides with the few remaining forces." Irsik concluded, "Overall, the game has those late 70s graphics and with the small map doesn't look like much. But don't let that fool you as this is a great game and ideal for teaching someone new to wargaming or for a quick two hour game."

In Issue 49 of Dragon, game designer and historian John Prados commented, "SPI produced a minigame view of Leningrad which unfortunately is hopelessly unbalanced."

Writing a retrospective review for the Spanish magazine Publicado in 2013, Alejandro Farnesio called this game "a simple and successful classic [...] without fanfare or excessive complications." Farnesio thought the game's greatest asset was the untried unit rule for Soviet forces, saying, "It ends up being fascinating to see how the German sends his units forward without knowing what they are going to find or trying to defend with the Russian without knowing how their forces will serve in combat. In addition, this gives the game great replayability, since no player ever knows the composition of the initial layout or the reinforcements." He concluded, "It is certainly one of my recommendations for entering the world of wargames.[...] This is a simple game worth trying."

== Other reviews and commentary ==
- Fire & Movement #22 & #63
- Campaign #105
- Line of Departure #34
- Paper Wars #21
- Simulacrum #17
- American Wargamer Vol.7 #12
- Richard Berg's Review of Games #17
- Casus Belli (Issue 5 - Sep 1981)
