= The Sorcerer's Cave =

Fantasy board and card game, published 1978

A game of exploration, magic, and adventure
- Designers: Terence Donelly
- Publishers: Ariel, Philmar, Gibson
- Publication: 1978
- Players: 1–4
- Setup time: 1–5 minutes
- Playing time: 1–3 hours
- Chance: Moderate
- Skills: Strategy, Luck

The Sorcerer's Cave is a fantasy board/card game designed by Terence Peter Donnelly and first published in 1978. Though greatly simplified, it was inspired by the fantasy role-playing game Dungeons & Dragons. Unlike D&D, however, Sorcerer's Cave does not require "Dungeon Master" or referee. One of its strengths is that it can be played solo or competitively, as well as cooperatively. Another is the diplomatic aspect of interactions between players with changing agendas. In general, player(s) gather and control a party (or parties) of adventurers who explore a multi-level dungeon that is randomly generated by drawing area cards from a deck. Encounters include special rooms, traps, monsters, allies, magical items and treasures.

== Playing ==
Player(s) start by creating a party from the various character types found in the game. Characters are differentiated by Fighting Strength, Magic Power and various unique abilities. All explorers start on the central "Gateway" tile, and progress by drawing area tiles (tunnel, chamber, or various special chambers). If the tile is a chamber, the player then draws a number of smaller 'encounter' cards (one card plus one for each deeper level up to four), and must deal with the characters and objects drawn. Encounter cards represent valuables, magical items and characters. If a chamber is occupied by non-player characters, the player must either withdraw, attack or approach – in which case a die roll determines whether characters are neutral (indifferent), friendly (joining your party), or hostile (prepare for combat).

The winning player is the one who escapes the cave with the most treasure. Rules for both solo play and competitive play are given, with several variations on victory conditions offered.

== Inspiration and assessment ==
Donnelly wrote that, after trying Dungeons & Dragons, "while I had enjoyed being a participant in a fantasy role-playing adventure, I wasn't ready to do the work needed to set one up... if only the concept could be translated into a format that would require no laborious set-up and no referee — a game that could be taken out of the box and played instantly, yet be different every time".

Ian Livingstone said of The Sorcerer's Cave: "As a family game, for the hour or two playing with the kids type market The Sorcerer's Cave works, and works well, but real Fantasy buffs will be disappointed by its simplicity when compared to D&D and the like".

== Publication history ==
Fantasy Games Unlimited became the American distributor for Philmar/Ariel Games in the late 1970s, and were therefore able to distribute Sorcerer's Cave.

== Other versions and expansions ==
An expansion set called The Sorcerer's Cave Extension Kit, containing 30 extra cave tiles and additional cards, was published in 1980. The Mystic Wood, another somewhat different randomly generated maze game designed by Donnelly, is a spiritual successor to Sorcerer's Cave set in a forest with each player having their own specific quest.

Circa 1995, Donnelly created a version of The Sorcerer's Cave for Microsoft Windows computers; as of 2020 it is distributed via his personal website. The ZX Spectrum computer game Goblin Mountain, by Martin Page (from Sinclair User #63, June 1987), also has clear similarities (especially the Friendly/Indifferent/Hostile reactions by strangers).

== Reviews ==
- Games & Puzzles #74
