= BAOR (game) =

1981 Cold War board wargame

- Cover of Strategy & Tactics #88
- Designers: Charles T. Kamps
- Illustrators: Redmond A. Simonsen
- Publishers: Simulations Publications Inc.
- Publication: 1981
- Genres: Cold War

BAOR, subtitled The Thin Red Line in the 1980s", is a board wargame published by Simulations Publications, Inc. (SPI) in 1981 that simulates a hypothetical invasion of West Germany by Warsaw Pact forces. It was the third game in SPI's "Central Front Series", and could be amalgamated with its predecessors Fifth Corps and Hof Gap.

== Description ==
BAOR (British Army of the Rhine) is a two-player wargame set before the fall of the Berlin Wall, when British forces, as part of their NATO commitment, were based in West Germany as part of the defense against a potential Warsaw Pact invasion. One player controls Soviet invaders and the other player controls NATO defenders. The game was the third installment in SPI's "Central Front Series", and uses an updated rule system that could be used in all of these games. The hex grid map, scaled at 4 km per hex, covers German countryside between the cities of Hannover and Kassel.

Each unit starts a turn with a number of Action Points, which are expended on movement and combat. When a unit has used all its Action Points, it cannot move or attack, but can defend. Units also gain Friction Points for movement and attacks, a measure of the unit's exhaustion and ability to fight. A unit that accumulates too many Friction Points is eliminated.

Each turn, the players dice to determine who will go first. The active player either passes, or moves any number of units, and resolves combat with each of them. Any unit that does not move in this first phase cannot be moved for the remainder of the game turn. The second player then has the same opportunity to pass, or to move and fire. Play then returns to the first player, who may pass, or move and fire any units that a) were moved in their first phase, and b) still have Action Points left. The second player has the same opportunity. This alternating pattern of phases continues until both players pass, marking the end of one game turn, which represents 12 hours of the battle. At the start of the next game turn, all units begin with their full Action Points restored.

There are also rules for supply, artillery, attack helicopters, air power, and engineers and bridges, chemical/biological weapons, and tactical nuclear weapons.

=== Scenarios ===
The game includes two scenarios:

- "Race for the Weser": This four-turn scenario simulates the first two days of the invasion. The NATO forces try to set up a defensive line in front of the Weser River, and Soviet forces try to break through.
- "The Thin Red Line": This ten-turn scenario simulates the first five days of a Soviet invasion. It takes 15 hours to play.

== Publication history ==
In 1980, SPI announced a series of ten games titled the Central Front series that would simulate a Warsaw Pact invasion along the entire length of the border between East and West Germany. The first five games would cover the border, and the next five games would cover the area to the west of the first games, as the invasion progressed. These games, which shared a common set of rules and map scale, could be played separately, or the maps of two or more could be combined to create a large campaign game.

After Fifth Corps and Hof Gap were released in 1980, the third game in the series was a free pull-out game in Issue 88 of SPI's house magazine Strategy & Tactics titled BAOR. The game, which featured an update to the rules system, was designed by Charles T. Kamps, with cartography and graphic design by Redmond A. Simonsen. This would be Kamps' last game design for SPI — he was laid off due to financial difficulties at SPI. BAOR would also be SPI's last game in the Central Front series — because of its financial difficulties, SPI was taken over by TSR in 1982 and work on the series ended.

Two more games in the series, North German Plain (1988) and Donau Front (1989), were published by World Wide Wargames (3W), but using much simplified rules. The final five games in the series originally envisioned by SPI were never created or published.

== Reception ==
In Issue 34 of the British wargaming magazine Phoenix, Donald Mack noted "the revised victory conditions of BAOR are a distinct improvement and can be adapted to the earlier games, making it possible to undertake a longer scenario without committing oneself to ten turns. (Note though, that the fewer the turns played the more likely the [Warsaw Pact] player will be to win as his initial progress will be rapid.)" Mack concluded, "Those who are prepared to devote the necessary time and attention and who are prepared to adapt the innovations of one game to another and to experiment with Turn 1 situations (as they are bidden to do so by the designer) will find they are dealing with an absorbing package which combines ingenuity and depth with a refreshing lack of complexity rare in recent 'modern' games."

In Issue 11 of Adventure Gaming, military scholar and game designer John Prados found "The game itself is up to the usual Simulations Publications standards of presentation ... Like the earlier games BAOR plays well with movement and combat integrated for each unit or stack and a (theoretically) limitless number of player-phases during each game turn." However, Prados found the game heavily unbalanced in favor of the Warsaw Pact invaders, and questioned some of the assumptions made about the perceived strength of the invaders. Prados noted that Soviet divisions could use their highest factors during mobile operations and noted "The implicit assumption is that the Soviets can land an airborne division virtually without equipment losses and, moreover, supply it at the high scales of ammunition and POL [petroleum, oil and lubricants] required for mobile operations through an airhead while at the same time making further air landings of conventional forces at the same airhead!" Prados also pointed out that British forces of the 1980s were believed to have the best defensive measures against chemical and biological weapons, but BAOR allows the Soviets to use these weapons just as effectively against British units as other NATO units. Prados also noted that the use of tactical nuclear weapons "has been at the center of NATO doctrine since 1968" but the game rules do not give any advantage to NATO in the use of these weapons. Prados was also skeptical that "nuclear weapons effects do not persist past the turn of firing! In a game with turns representing twelve hours each, such an approach is laughable and hardly deserves to be called simulation." Prados concluded, "Simulations Publications seems to have fallen victim to the hysterical views of some in the West that everything about Soviet military power is better than everything about our own ... More research about weapons effects and better modeling of tactical flexibility versus operational rigidity is necessary to make BAOR a truly balanced game. Unfortunately, once again, the work has to be done by the gamer at home instead of by the designer and his publisher. Would that it were not so."

== Other recognition ==
A copy of BAOR is held in the Canadian Museum of History (artifact number 2004.18.164.2).
