= Freedom: The Underground Railroad =

Board game

- The box cover of Freedom: The Underground Railroad, 1st edition
- Designers: Brian Mayer
- Illustrators: Jarek Nocoń (graphics and illustration), Steve Paschal (cover painting)
- Publishers: Academy Games (U.S.)
- Players: 1-4
- Setup time: 10 min
- Playing time: 90 min
- Age range: 10+
- Skills: strategy, cooperation, logic, logistics

Freedom: The Underground Railroad is a 2013 co-operative board game designed by Brian Mayer and published by Academy Games, their first game in the Freedom Series. The game has drawn positive attention for its approach and handling of the topic.

A card-driven, co-operative game set in early American History, Freedom: The Underground Railroad has players working together for the Abolitionist Movement to help bring an end to slavery in the United States. The players use a combination of cards, which feature historical figures and events spanning from early independence until the Civil War and contain action tokens and character benefits which impact the game. The game can be played solo or up to four players, each playing one of six possible archetypes from the abolitionist movement: agent, conductor, preacher, shepherd, station master, or stockholder.

Several small card expansions, also designed by Mayer, were released with the Kickstarter version, each adding several new cards to the Abolitionist Deck.

== Gameplay ==
The first goal that players need to achieve in Freedom: The Underground Railroad are to help a certain number of slaves make their way northward to freedom in Canada. How many varies depends on the number of players and the difficulty level of the game. The second winning condition is that the group needs to collectively raise the strength of the Abolitionist Movement, helping to bring about more permanent changes, by acquiring all of the support tokens in the game.

Freedom: The Underground Railroad components consists of a game board representing connections between cities and spaces on the map of the United States, three decks of cards (Role cards, Abolitionist cards, and Slave Market cards), five slave catcher tokens, 110 wooden cubes representing the men, women and children trapped in slavery, slave catcher movement dice, action tokens (support, fundraising, and conductor), money, and a lead player token. The Abolitionist cards are broken up into three eras (1800-1839, 1840–1859, 1860–1865) and feature historical events and individuals from those eras that impacted the fight for freedom, both positively and negatively. General Abolitionist cards are used when acquired, Reserve Abolitionist cards can be held onto until an opportune time, and Opposition cards work against the players in various ways. At the start of the game, Opposition cards are distributed throughout the three era decks. Players are given a random role at the beginning of the game.

There are 8 rounds in the game, each consisting of five phases:
1. Slave Catcher Phase - the lead player rolls and resolves the Slave Catcher and Movement Dice.
2. Planning Phase - Each player may take up to a total of two action tokens.
3. Action Phase - Starting with the lead player, players may take the following actions in any order:

- Play an action token
- Play a second action token
- Buy and resolve one Abolitionist Card
- Gain the benefit of the player's Role Card
- Use the player's Role Card one time Special Ability

4. Slave Market Phase - Deliver slaves from the bottom Slave Market card to the plantations.
5. Lantern Phase - Discard any card in the right most space of the Abolitionist Queue (2 spaces for the solo or 2-player game), possibly triggering any Opposition cards in those spaces. Check for victory, if not pass the Lead Player token and continue.

The game is over if any of the following occur:

- The 8th round ends without reaching both victory conditions - a loss for the players.
- The Slaves Lost track fills up and another slave is lost - a loss for the players.
- The players achieve both victory conditions and finish the current round without losing too many slaves - a victory for the players.

== Expansions ==
- Freedom: The Underground Railroad – Abolitionist Cards: a mini-expansion that adds cards for each of the three eras, including Samuel Joseph May, Josiah Henson, Thomas Garrett, Anna Elizabeth Dickinson, John Parker Hale, Robert Purvis, Southern Secession, Alexander Milton Ross, American Anti-Slavery Society, and Hundred Conventions Project.
- Freedom: The Underground Railroad – Opposition Cards: a mini-expansion that adds new Opposition cards to be used with the game, including: U.S. Marhalls, Pennsylvania Hall, Tough Crossing, and a second Fugitive Slave Act card.
- Freedom: The Underground Railroad – Reserve Cards: a mini-expansion that adds new Reserve cards for each of the three eras, including: The Quakers, Personal Liberty Laws, Principles of '98, and Slave Grapevine.

== Educational use ==
Freedom: The Underground Railroad is the topic of a first book in a series of books being published by Rosen Publishing, centered on the use of games as educational resources.

== Awards and recognition ==
- 2013 Winner Best Co-op Game - Dice Tower Awards
- 2013 Winner Best New Designer - Dice Tower Awards
- 2013 Winner Best Game Theming - Dice Tower Awards
- 2013 Game of the Year - Drive-Thru Review
- 2013 Theme of the Year - De Tafel Plakt! (The Table Sticks)
- 2013 Board Game of the Year - The Wargamer
- 2013 Winner Best Historical Game - Club Fantasci Board Game Awards
- 2013 Winner Most Innovative Game - Club Fantasci Board Game Awards
- 2013 Winner Best New Designer - Club Fantasci Board Game Awards
- 2013 Winner Best Thematic Game - Board Game Quest Awards
- 2013 Winner Cooperative Game - Board Game Quest Awards
- 2014 General Strategy Multiplayer Game - International Gamers Awards
- 2013 Golden Geek Best Thematic Board Game Nominee - Board Game Geek
- 2014 Best Historical Game Nominee - Origins Awards
- 2013 Best Strategy Game Nominee - Dice Tower Awards
- 2013 Most Innovative Game Nominee - Dice Tower Awards
- 2013 Best Game of the Year Nominee - Dice Tower Awards
- 2013 Game of the Year Nominee - Club Fantasci Board Game Awards
- 2013 Best Co-Operative Game Nominee - Club Fantasci Board Game Awards
- 2013 Best Thematic Game Nominee - Club Fantasci Board Game Awards
