= Flash Point: Fire Rescue =

Firefighter-themed cooperative strategy board game

- Box cover
- Designers: Kevin Lanzing
- Publishers: 999 Games; Hobby Japan; Indie Boards and Cards; MINDOK
- Publication: November 21, 2011; 14 years ago
- Players: 1 to 6
- Playing time: 45 minutes
- Chance: Medium (dice rolling)
- Age range: 10 and up

Flash Point: Fire Rescue is a thematic cooperative board game designed by Kevin Lanzing with the help of firefighters that was released in November 2011. The objective is for players to work together to rescue people and animals from a burning building before it collapses. Since the initial release of the game several expansions have been published, which add additional scenarios for players experience. These include fires in a high rise building, a two-story house, and a submarine.

== Description ==
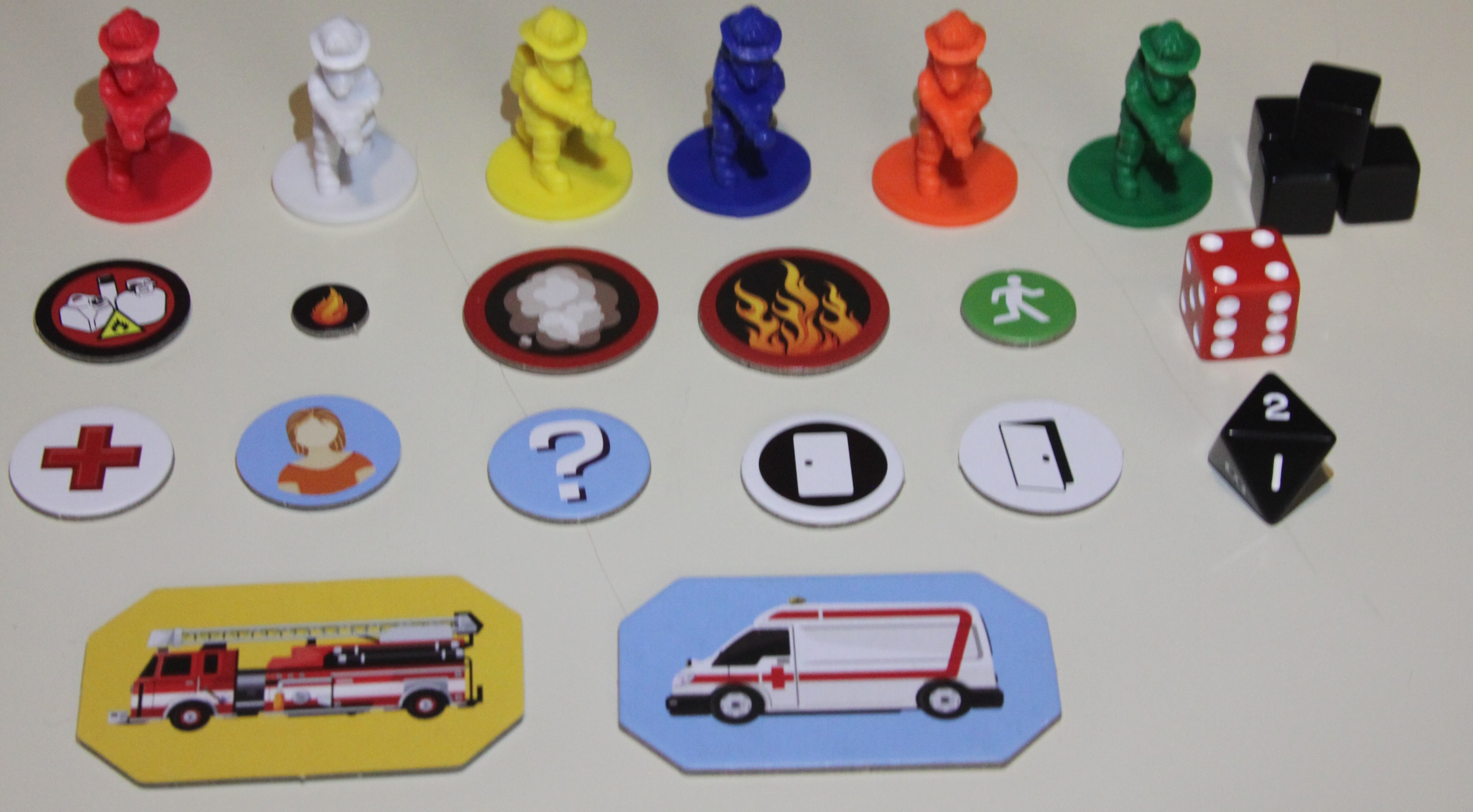
Flashpoint game pieces

Players are firefighters who at the simplest "family" level can move, put out fires, cut through walls and rescue victims; higher levels introduce specialized roles such as the fire captain, the engine operator, hazmat technicians and paramedics. The game "owe[s] a lot to Pandemic".

== Development ==
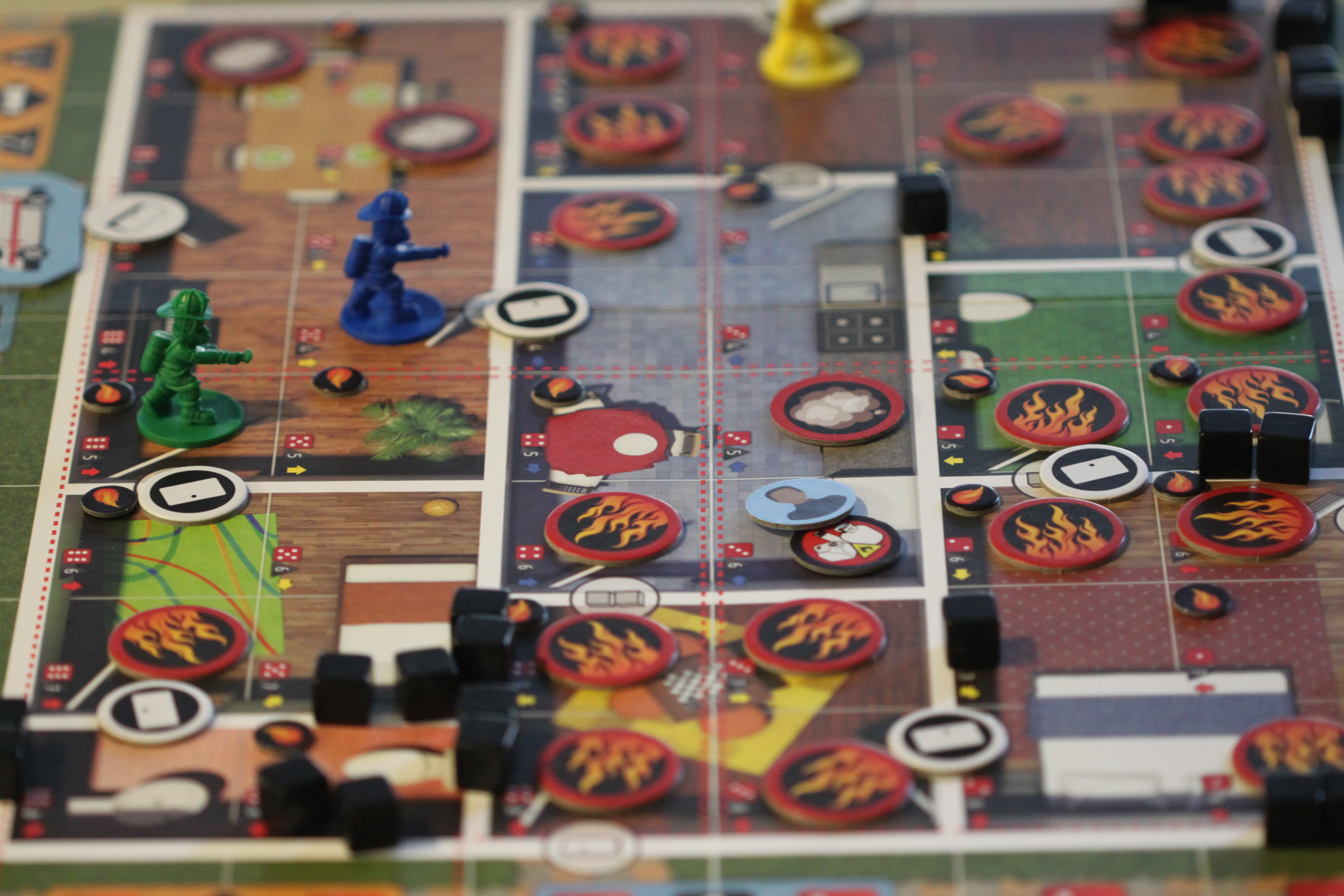
Flashpoint game in progress

The game's development was crowdfunded through a Kickstarter campaign, with a 30-day funding period that ended on August 18, 2011, with nearly 900 backers, and pledges amounting to more than an order of magnitude greater than the $5000 goal. The money covered expenses such as artwork, product safety tests, and the first print run.

== Expansions ==
Flash Point: Fire Rescue has had eight expansions that can be combined with the base game.

=== Urban Structures ===
The Urban Structures expansion was initially released in 2011 in limited quantities as a Kickstarter exclusive for the base game, but in a second Kickstarter, funding was acquired to re-release the expansion commercially.

It includes two additional maps (one on each side of the included board): Brownstone, an urban duplex apartment; and High Rise, an office building introducing elevator spaces, light walls and heavily reinforced walls. The expansions further includes a Structural Engineer, that can Clear Hot Spots and Repair Damaged Walls.

=== 2nd Story ===
This expansion was released in 2012 and comprises two buildings (Villa and Hotel), each with two floors. The expansion introduces portable ladders, staircases, and windows. Additionally, the expansion set comes with physical AP Trackers and an explosion marker to ease gameplay.

=== Extreme Danger ===
The third expansion was funded through Kickstarter in 2013 and includes two new maps: Laboratory, a two-story building; and Mechanic's Garage, a one-story building. Both maps can be combined with the included add-on board, featuring the Basement or Attic. This add-on board can also be combined with 2nd Story. To allow for the greater playable area, a 12-sided die is included as well.

Similar to 2nd Story, the game also includes portable ladders, staircases, and windows. Also included are Damaged Floors, Fire Doors (that can jam when they are hit with an explosion), and Dangerous Objects (that can either explode or create a Chemical Spill). Finally, the Hydraulic Platform can be chosen to replace the Deck Gun.

This expansion comes with its own box and includes firefighter-specific miniatures with colored bases. Kickstarter backers also received an exclusive bonus pack, including different victims and locked doors. These were not included with the retail edition.

=== Veteran and Rescue Dog ===
This expansion was included as a Kickstarter exclusive with the Extreme Danger expansion, but was later released to retail. The expansion comes with two new specialists and their respective miniatures.

=== Dangerous Waters ===
The Dangerous Waters expansion adds two maps: the Merchant Ship and a Submarine, the latter of which uses an atypical board layout creating a stretched submarine. Both maps feature Bulkheads that cannot be damaged, and Fire Proof Doors. This expansion could be bought together with the Extreme Danger Kickstarter.

=== Honor & Duty ===
In 2014, a Kickstarter campaign was launched for the Honor & Duty expansion. This expansion includes the maps Subway Station and Airfield, and adds the ability to fire the Deck Gun with foam.

Backers of the Kickstarter campaign also received the Fire Prevention Specialist (without miniature) and a game board with an alternative Attic and Basement, that can be used with the Extreme Danger expansion. The Fire Prevention Specialist was later added to the Tragic Events expansion, with miniature.

=== Tragic Events ===
The latest expansion, released in 2017, remains a Kickstarter-exclusive expansion. It replaces the Hot Spot mechanic in the base game with event cards. It additionally adds three specialists (with miniatures): Strategist, Suppression Specialist, and Fire Prevention Specialist.
