= Long Day (disambiguation) =

"Long Day" is a song by Matchbox Twenty from their 1996 album Yourself or Someone Like You.

Long Day may also refer to:

- "Long Day", a song by Soul Asylum from their 1984 album Say What You Will, Clarence... Karl Sold the Truck
- "Long Day", a song by Nebula from their 2002 album Dos EPs
- "Section 10 (A Long Day)", a song by The Polyphonic Spree from their 2002 album The Beginning Stages of...

== See also ==
- The Longest Day (disambiguation)
