= Fast Attack Boats =

Board game

Fast Attack Boats is a two-player combat board game published by Yaquinto Publications in 1980. The game simulates naval combat between Arab and Israeli missile boats during the 1973 Arab-Israeli War. The game is an introductory level product with an emphasis on playability over historical accuracy.

== Publication ==
Yaquinto Games issued Fast Attack Boats as one in their series of "Album Games", which used the same-sized jacket as a double vinyl record album, with the mapboard printed inside the jacket and game components stored in the two sleeves. Other games in the Album Games series included Swashbuckler.

The game components are:

- 179 die-cut counters representing Egyptian, Israeli, and Syrian boats and missiles;
- a 12" by 24" hexagon-patterned abstract scale mapboard (printed on the inside surface of the album cover)
- two plastic bags for counters
- a game card for each player
- a rulebook.

The game requires but does not include two six-sided dice. Yaquinto Publications did not issue errata for Fast Attack Boats.

== Game Play ==
Fast Attack Boats may be played to represent a single engagement under the "Battle Game" rules, or a series of up to ten engagements under the "Strategic Game" rules. The mechanics of both are identical with the exception of fleet selection and deployment.

In the Battle Game, players agree upon a common total number of points for each fleet and select naval units of varying point values until each fleet has reached its limit. All units are immediately deployed, Arab units forming a line on one side of the mapboard and Israeli units on the other. The rectangular shape of the mapboard, long missile ranges, and the requirement for boats to use their full movement value often lead the two opposing sides into simple head-on charges. The range, large quantity and high degree of destructiveness of the cruise missiles also typically leaves the much shorter range guns and torpedoes to play a minimal role near the end of an engagement, and the confines of the mapboard limit boats trying to maneuver. Most battle games, therefore, are completed in 15–30 minutes or less and involve a significant degree of luck over skill. The winning player is the one with the last surviving boat on the mapboard.

The Strategic Game requires the use of all naval units, and divides the forces into three sides (Egyptian, Syrian and Israeli). The Arab player divides up the Egyptian and Syrian fleets for five rounds of combat each, while the Israeli player must fight all ten engagements (5 rounds against each Arab power). There is provision for players to shift forces from one round to the next, but the Egyptian and Syrian fleets operate independently and may not combine, a restriction the Israeli player does not face. The movement and combat sequence of play is identical to the Battle Game. The Strategic Game is slightly more complex than the Battle Game and may require three or more hours to resolve, but is still predominantly a game of chance. The winner is the first player to reach six victories, or in the event of an even number of victories, the side that lost the fewest total points in the values of the eliminated boats.

The Arab fleet is composed of Komar and Osa boats armed with Styx missiles and P4 torpedo boats. The Israeli fleet is made up of assorted Saar boats equipped with a mix of Gabriel Mk1 and Mk2 missiles and torpedoes.

Alternative rules include allowing two persons to play the Arab fleets in the Strategic Game, thus creating a three-player game; permitting the Israeli player to move less than the full movement factor to reflect Israel's better trained crews; and making ramming more difficult.

== Simulation Value ==
Fast Attack Boats admittedly does not attempt to replicate the lopsided naval engagements that took place during the 1973 Arab-Israeli War, but instead is designed as a game that "captures the flavor of the actual events." Consequently, it does not simulate any particular naval exchange or geographic area, instead opting for generic open seas engagements with player-selected fleets.

The rulebook's "Brief Historical Summary" incorrectly characterizes the 1973 Arab-Israel War's naval encounters as "one of the most decisive and stunning victories by a weaker power in the history of sea warfare," and that if "the Arab powers had been able to gain control of the sea, they could have disrupted the flow of supplies to Israel, which could have meant disaster for the hard-pressed Israeli Army." While the Israeli Navy's performance was impressive, it was not one of naval history's stunning victories and had no effect on the ground campaigns in the Golan or the Sinai where the conflict was decided. Moreover, while the United States did begin resupplying Israel at the end of the first week of the war, these military supplies were sent via air, and even then arrived too late and in too few quantities to influence the outcome of the war. The legacy of the conflict instead lies in the debut of electronic countermeasures in naval combat and the widespread use of cruise missiles.

The designer also takes liberties with the actual equipment and tactics both sides employed during the conflict. For example, Fast Attack Boats does not factor in Israel's highly effective electronic countermeasures that rendered the Arab Styx missiles largely useless, or the Syrian fleet's use of unwitting merchant ships to hide behind from incoming Israeli Gabriel missiles. The rules do devote significant attention to ramming an opponent's boat, although this tactic was not used in the 1973 Arab-Israeli War and is generally not a feature of 20th century naval combat, but probably reflects the narrow confines of the mapboard and the near inevitability of the two fleets crossing one another's path during game play.

== Credits ==
Design and Research: Neil Zimmerer
Development and Rules: S. Craig Taylor, Jr.
Production Coordination: J. Stephen Peek
Box Art: Charles Micah
Graphics: Yaquinto Printing Co.
Playtesters: Mayfair Wargamers, Bob Armstrong, Nolan Bond, Joel Breger, Chris Cornaghie, William Cutrer, Kevin Duke, John Ford, Dave Furguson, William Glankler, Frank Hernandez, Wayne Lanham, James McDonnel, Steve Peek, Mike Pellam, Cliff Pellam, George Petronis, Ed Safley, John Paul Snellen, and John White

== Reception ==
In the March 1981 edition of Dragon (Issue 47), Roberto Camino found the graphics a bit drab compared to other games on the market, but considered the rules "quite complete". Camino criticized the single map, which he found to be quite confining for combat based on boats that historically used hit and run tactics. He also questioned the premise of the basic game, in which historical accuracy was sacrificed for ease of play. Camino concluded, "While Fast Attack Boats is undeniably fun and fulfills its intent of being a good game, those looking for extensive insight into small craft tactics had better look in another direction."

== Sources ==
- Elusive Victory: The Arab-Israeli Wars, 1947-1974, by Trevor N. Dupuy, Harper and Row, New York, 1978
- A Survey of Arab-Israeli War Games, by Ian Chadwick, in Moves Magazine #55, February–March 1981, p13, 17
- Fast Attack Boats, by Don Lowry, in Campaign Magazine #102, March–April 1982
- Arabs at War: Military Effectiveness 1948-1991, by Kenneth M. Pollack, University of Nebraska Press, Lincoln, Nebraska, 2002
