= Voyage of the B.S.M. Pandora =

Ares #6, in which this game was published

Voyage of the B.S.M. Pandora, subtitled "Adventures on Unknown Worlds", is a solitaire science fiction board game published by Simulations Publications, Inc. (SPI) in 1981.

== Description ==
Voyage of the B.S.M. Pandora, the prequel to the previously published SPI game Wreck of the B.S.M. Pandora (1980), is a solitaire game about a distant future space ship on a biological survey mission to a fixed number of unsurveyed planets. The player searches for and collects alien life forms, trying to minimize losses of crew, equipment and robots, while maximizing the number of life forms collected.

=== Gameplay ===
The B.S.M. Pandora has a crew of seven, each with different skills, as well as four robots with different capabilities and several pieces of specialized equipment. When the ship reaches a planet, the player reads the planet's description from a list of 232 different paragraphs. With limited room in the space shuttle and only one round trip to the surface allowed, the player must decide which crew members, robots and equipment will shuttle down to the planet's surface in search of collectible life forms.

== Publication history ==
In the May 1980 edition of Ares (Issue 2), SPI published a science fiction game, Wreck of the B.S.M. Pandora, in which 1–6 players try to repair a downed spacecraft before they are killed by environmental factors or escaped aliens that had been collected before the crash.

Four issues later, in the January 1981 edition (Issue 6), SPI published a prequel game, Voyage of the B.S.M. Pandora, to explain how the ship had collected the aliens before it crashed. The game was designed by John H. Butterfield and Edward J. Woods, and featured art by Butterfield and Redmond A. Simonsen.

In Issue 8 of Ares, Justin Leites explained how to combine the two games, Wreck of the B.S.M. Pandora and Voyage of the B.S.M. Pandora into a campaign game by starting with Voyage, collecting alien species, then after the Pandora suffers an accident, the players switch to Wreck, but replacing the aliens given in the game rules with the aliens they captured in the first part of the game.

== Reception ==
Milo B. Shiff reviewed Voyage of the B.S.M. Pandora in The Space Gamer No. 38. Shiff commented that "Overall, I would recommend this game to anyone who enjoys science fiction literature and has an itching to be a character in the book. The game is an excellent compromise between a novel and a role-playing game."

The Polish game review site Tanuki Czytelnia provided a retrospective review in 2010, and found the rules to be complex "and needed to be read several times." However, once the rules were mastered, the game was judged to be "brilliant" and "addictive". With over 230 possible planets, "the plot always took a different turn" in various games. Tanuki Czytelnia concluded that for players looking to take a break from computer games, Pandora still had the ability "to provide a lot of entertainment."

The Encyclopedia of Science Fiction cited the game as "the most influential early example" in the context of development of solitaire board games and "perhaps the first successful example of a single-player, paragraph-system board game".
