= Spacewar =

Spacewar, Space Wars, or variation, may refer to:

- Space warfare, war in outer space

== Literature ==
- Doctor Who and the Space War, a 1976 Doctor Who novelization by Malcolm Hulke
- Space War, a 1935 Professor Jameson novel by Neil R. Jones
- Space War, a comic book series by Charlton Comics which ran from October 1959 to March 1964 and from March 1978 to March 1979 for a total of 34 issues
- Space Wars: Worlds & Weapons, a 1979 non-fiction book by Robert Holdstock under the pseudonym Steven Eisler
- Space Wars, a 1988 short story collection by Poul Anderson, edited by Martin H. Greenberg and Charles G Waugh
- Space Wars, a Beast Quest novel series by Adam Blade

== Television ==
- "Space War", Space Angel episodes 76–80 (1963)
- "Space Wars", Action Man episode 23 (1996)
- "Space Wars", Disaster DIY season 2, episode 16 (2008)
- "Space Wars", Leave It to Bryan season 1, episode 9 (2012)
- "Space Wars", Men with Brooms episode 10 (2010)
- "Space Wars", The Universe season 4, episode 8 (2009)
- "Space Wars", Tommy & Oscar season 2, episode 7 (2001)
- "The Space War", Space Patrol season 4, episode 30 (1954)

== Video gaming ==
- Spacewar!, a 1962 game for the PDP-1, one of the earliest examples of a video game.
- Spacewar, a Steamworks integration tool/test game, delivered to developers for games on Steam
- Videocart-5: Space War, a 1977 video game for the Fairchild Channel F
- Space Wars, a 1977 vector graphics arcade game
- Space War, a 1978 video game for the Atari VCS

== Other uses ==
- Space War, a 1997 animated short film by Christy Karacas
- Space Wars, a 1997 album featuring cover versions of film and television musical themes by The Starlite Orchestra
- Space Wars, the Star Wars-like fictional comic book owned by Timmy Turner featured in "Hard Copy", season 4, episode 3a of The Fairly OddParents (2003)
- The Space War, an unproduced Doctor Who television serial written by Ian Stuart Black

== See also ==
- The War in Space, a 1977 tokusatsu science fiction film produced by Toho
- Interstellar war
- Space Warriors (disambiguation)
