= Robinson Crusoe: Adventures on the Cursed Island =

Board game

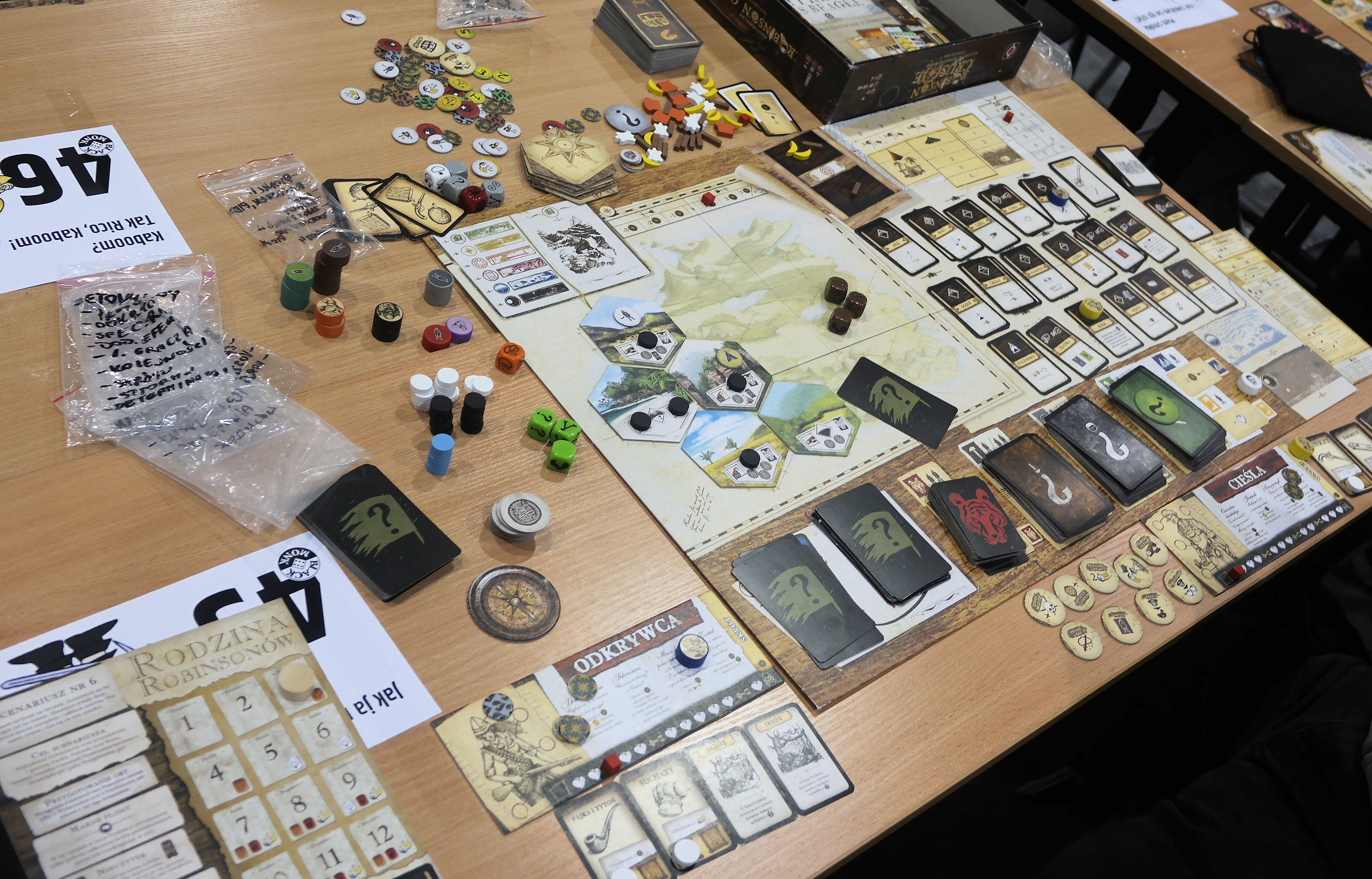
Gameplay of Robinson Crusoe: Adventure on the Cursed Island

Robinson Crusoe: Adventures on the Cursed Island is a 2012 storytelling cooperative board game published by Polish company Portal Games and designed by Ignacy Trzewiczek.

== Awards ==
- 2013 Swiss Gamers Award Winner
- 2013 Gra Roku Advanced Game of the Year Winner
- 2013 Golden Geek Best Thematic Board Game Winner
