= O.K. Corral (card game) =

Card game

O.K. Corral is a 1980 card game published by Discovery Games.

== Gameplay ==
O.K. Corral is a card game about a gunfight in the street.

== Reception ==
Stephen Taylor reviewed O.K. Corral in The Space Gamer No. 33. Taylor commented that "The game is fantastically easy to play, and is rather fun. It is recommended that players use this as a 'wind-down' or 'warm-up' game, not the reason for bringing the gang together. [...] A great little card game."
