= The Hammer of Thor: The Game of Norse Mythology =

Multiple-player game

The Hammer of Thor
- Cover of the second edition
- Designers: Joe Angiolillo
- Publishers: Nova Game Designs
- Publication: 1980; 45 years ago
- Genres: Fantasy

The Hammer of Thor, subtitled "The Game of Norse Mythology", is a board game for 2–362 players published by Nova Game Designs (originally Gameshop) in 1980.

== Gameplay ==
The Hammer of Thor is a game in which each player chooses a champion from Norse mythology to be the victor at the battle of Ragnarok between the Norse gods and the giants. Players spend the game in wilderness adventures, gathering and strengthening their forces and burnishing their reputation.

=== Components ===
- 17" x 22" map board printed on glossy paper
- 120 counters
- explanation of abilities card
- random encounter chart
- 4 character sheets
- a 20-sided die
- 677 cards printed on cardstock
- rule book

=== Victory conditions ===
At the final battle of Ragnarok, one side, Good or Evil, will triumph. The player on the winning side who has accumulated the highest reputation wins the game.

== Publication history ==
The game was designed by Joe Angiolillo and published by Gameshop in 1980. Gameshop then changed their name to Nova Game Designs, and published a second edition that added leader action cards to the components.

== Reception ==
In Issue 47 of the British wargaming magazine Perfidious Albion, Geoffrey Barnard called it, "a major attempt to reduce Norse mythology to a gameable concept, and they just might have pulled it off. Its rules are a trifle odd, and the unmounted mapboard does not compare with the final item but the amount of work and care is so impressive you simply have to take your hat off to them."

In the October 1980 edition of Military Modelling (Vol. 10, No. 10), Charles Vasey called the game "very impressive" and also noted that despite "very considerable research", that the game was "not difficult to play." He concluded, "One is staggered by such design work."

In the May 1981 edition of Dragon (Issue #49), Bill Fawcett thought that the game "ought to be a good, if not a great game [...] But the game isn't nearly as much fun to play as it should be." He blamed this in part on the number of components, specifically over 600 cards, and he also found the production values were poor. He noted the small map board "quickly becomes cramped and verges on being unplayable when four or more players are involved." And despite complex but understandable rules and several good concepts, Fawcett found that "The game itself, however, is almost overwhelmed by all of the 'chrome' built into the rules. The individual parts and concepts are good, but the framework of the game doesn’t always lend itself to the easy application of all the details." He concluded, "If you are deeply interested, or even casually interested, in Norse mythology, you’ll appreciate and enjoy the game, despite its technical drawbacks. If you’re looking for a fast-moving, multi-player game, this might not be a good choice; it takes quite a bit of effort on the players’ parts to get the game 'off the ground' and rolling smoothly."

In the September 1981 edition of The Space Gamer (Issue No. 43), W.G. Armintrout noted that the game "is certainly complete. The 600+ cards include every mythical character (from Thor himself to Audhumla the Original Cow) plus every magical gadget or dwarvish artifact ever mentioned in legend." However, Armintrout noted "Hammer's tragic flaw is its rules", calling some rules incomprehensive, others "vague", and others thought the game more amateur than professional, saying, "Hammer of Thor was a labor of love on the part of the designer. Too bad Nova didn't assign him as a developer. The game is not playable as published, nor are any simple fixes going to help – I recommend Hammer only to Norse mythology freaks who want to rewrite major sections of the rulebook."

In Issue 32 of Phoenix (July–August 1981), John Lambshead noted the high cost of the game, but was not impressed by the components, calling the artwork of the cards "uniformly uninspiring," and noting that some of the cards were of uneven size, and the log sheet was a cheap photocopy. Lambshead was not sure whether The Hammer of Thor was designed as a board game with element of role-playing, or a role-playing game played on a board, and found little help in the unindexed rules. He also noted that because only one player at a time is active, everyone else has to sit and wait. "It gets very boring for the uninvolved players awaiting their turn." He concluded, "I cannot see this game being of general interest although it is the sort of thing that may well come to have a small but enthusiastic following."

== Other recognition ==
A copy of The Hammer of Thor: The Game of Norse Mythology is held in the collection of the Strong National Museum of Play (object 112.6518).
