= Barbarian Kings =

Board game

Ares #3 contained Barbarian Kings as a pull-out game. Art by Redmond A. Simonsen, 1980

Barbarian Kings is a fantasy board game published by Simulations Publications, Inc. (SPI) in 1980.

== Description ==
=== Components ===
The original pull-out game came with

- 100 die-cut counters
- 11" x 17" paper map
- rulebook

The boxed edition added a six-sided die. The 2001 edition published by Jolly Games replaced the cardboard counters with wooden pieces.

== Gameplay ==
Barbarian Kings is a fantasy game of conquest for 2–5 players where kings vie for control of the continent of Allaven. Players build armies based on the pieces of territory they own. Movement is simultaneous, and armies that meet do not have to fight. If combat does occur, it is resolved by comparing the strengths of the two armies, rolling a single die, and consulting a Combat Results Table. Possible results are elimination of one of the armies, retreat or draw. Kings and wizards can also cast spells that have various in-game effects.

== Publication history ==
Barbarian Kings, designed by Greg Costikyan, and with cover art, graphic design and cartography by Redmond A. Simonsen, was first published by SPI as a pull-out game in Issue #3 of Ares. SPI subsequently released it as a boxed game later the same year.

Following the demise of SPI, Jolly Games acquired the license to Barbarian Kings and republished the game in 2001.

== Reception ==
In Issue 32 of The Space Gamer, Keith Gross was ambivalent about the game, saying, "A die-hard fan of fantasy boardgames, particularly Swords & Sorcery, might like Barbarian Kings. Others should avoid it."

In a retrospective review of Barbarian Kings in Black Gate, John ONeill said "if you're in the market for a fast-paced game that embraces the virtues of simplicity and imagination, you should have a look at Barbarian Kings — especially if you’re bringing a love of 1970s fantasy to the table. It's a launching pad to more than a few realms you may be familiar with."

== Other reviews ==
- Casus Belli #13 (Feb 1983)
- Campaign #100
- The American Wargamer, Vol. 8, No. 2
- Moves #52, p15-18
