= Doctor Who: The Game of Time & Space =

1980 board game

Doctor Who: The Game of Time & Space is a board game published by Games Workshop in 1980 that is based on the long-running British television series Doctor Who.

== Description ==
The planet Gallifrey, home of the Time Lords, is expecting an attack, and the only defence will be the Key of Chronos. However, the Key has been taken apart and the pieces scattered across time and space. Players take on the roles of various iterations of The Doctor striving to search for pieces and reassemble the Key.

=== Components ===
The game contains:

- Board
- 76 Alien counters
- 76 Scientific Item counters
- 6 Alien & Item files
- 36 Key Mission counters
- 95 Key Part counters (36 real key parts, 59 blanks)
- 6 tokens
- rules booklet
- twelve sided die.

=== Setup ===
- An alien counter and an item counter are placed facedown on every one of the 60 planets displayed on the board.
- Players are secretly given six random Key Missions each, which describe which Key parts the player has to find.
- The real Key parts and enough blank Key parts to make a total of 60 are shuffled together, then placed facedown on the 60 planets.
- Each player receives a random Assistant.

=== Gameplay ===
Each turn, the active player can choose two of three activities: move, search, fight.

==== Move ====
Each player can move their token two squares in any direction. If a token reaches one of the space/time warp squares at the edge of the board, the token can be teleported to the far side of the board onto another space/time warp square of the matching color.

When returning to Gallifrey at the end of the game, a token cannot move two squares directly onto Gallifrey. The token must be moved adjacent to Gallifrey on one turn, and then can move to Gallifrey on the next turn.

==== Search ====
Searching a planet involves turning over the alien counter for everyone to see, and secretly examing the Key part — which may be a Key part the player needs, or a Key part needed by another player, or a blank. The Item counter is left untouched.

In order to collect the Item and the Key part, the player must destroy the alien. If the Doctor decides the alien is too strong and leaves the planet without combat, then the Key part is turned over for all players to see. Any Doctor arriving on the planet can fight the alien for the Key part and the Item.

==== Fight ====
Each alien counter has a strength number, which the alien must equal or exceed on the 12-sided die in order to hit the Doctor. The Doctor also has a strength number, but this may be modified by an Assistant or carried Items.

- If the alien fails to hit and the Doctor succeeds, then the alien is destroyed, and the Doctor can pick up both the planet's Item and the Key part. (The Doctor does not have to reveal either to the other players.)
- If the Doctor fails to hit and the alien succeeds, then the Doctor is stunned for two turns, and may lose Items or Key parts, depending on which monster the Doctor was fighting.

=== Victory conditions ===
The first player to collect the six Key parts described in their Key Missions and successfully return to Gallifrey is the winner.

== Reception ==
In the April 1981 edition of The Space Gamer (No. 38) Forrest Johnson was not overly impressed, believing the target audience was younger players rather than adult gamers. He concluded, "Recommended to die-hard Dr. Who fans or to those who are beginning to find Candyland a little dull."

In Issue 35 of Phoenix (January–February 1982), Paul King thought it was an enjoyable game but noted "It is aimed at the younger end of the market without a doubt, and is very successful in this aim." He concluded, "Full marks to Games Workshop for this design at least, it lives up to expectations and provides a fun game which can be played in less than two hours with six players."

== Reviews ==
- Games & Puzzles #80
