= Kings & Castles =

Board game

Kings & Castles is a 1980 board game published by Athena Games.

== Gameplay ==
Kings & Castles is a fantasy board game where 2-8 players are individual kings warring against each other.

== Reception ==
Jerry Epperson reviewed Kings & Castles in The Space Gamer No. 38. Epperson commented that "Kings & Castles is one of the best fantasy wargames that I have played in a long time. It has a high excitement value and is definitely worth buying. You won't get 'stuck' with this one."
