= Antarctica: The Battle for the Seventh Continent =

- Author: Doaa Abdel-Motaal
- Language: English
- Published: 2016
- Publisher: Praeger Publishing
- ISBN: 978-1-4408-4803-2
- OCLC: 956984821

Antarctica: The Battle for the Seventh Continent is a 2016 book by Doaa Abdel-Motaal that discusses the future of Antarctica, arguing that the thawing continent offers living space, mineral and marine resources that were previously inaccessible. It calls upon the international community to revisit the Antarctic Treaty System and divide up the continent preemptively so as to spare the world serious conflict. The book explores different alternatives for the peaceful resolution of the problems posed by Antarctica's unique situation.
