= Warlock (card game) =

Warlock is a 1980 card game published by Games Workshop.

== Gameplay ==
Warlock is a game in which wizards duel each other by conjuring creatures such as dragons, dwarves, and heroes.

== Reception ==
Charles Vasey reviewed Warlock for White Dwarf #23, giving it an overall rating of 8 out of 10, and stated that "This game is far from complex and it's an admirable introduction to gaming for the more intelligent, a good subject for a family game, or simply for unwinding with a good workable multi-player game with fine graphics, which can be adjusted easily to the time you have to hand."

Forrest Johnson reviewed Warlock in The Space Gamer No. 38. Johnson commented that "Warlock is too complicated for a parlor game, but does not allow enough strategy for a good wargame. A nice try, but overdesigned, overpackaged, and overpriced."

Dan Joyce retroactively reviewed Warlock for Arcane magazine and stated that "Warlock wasn't a bad game. It was quick, it was easy, games only lasted half an hour or so, and you could play it with two people as easily as with six. I quite liked it, but it never became anything more than a way to kill time while waiting for someone to turn up for the roleplaying game that we were running that day."

== Reviews ==
- Dragon #53
- Games & Puzzles #80
