= Engage & Destroy =

Board game from 1980

Engage & Destroy is a 1980 board wargame published by Chaosium.

== Gameplay ==
Engage & Destroy is a set of contemporary miniatures rules for HO and micro models for strategic campaigns.

== Reception ==
Nick Schuessler reviewed Engage & Destroy in The Space Gamer No. 34. Schuessler commented that "For some time, the physical qualify of miniatures has not been matched by quality rules for gaming with miniatures. Sadly, Engage & Destroy does nothing to reverse this trend. The technical data might be of interest to a hard-core contemporary type, or a neophyte who is interested in getting into the era. But the price, the poor organization, and the errors call for a 'not recommended.'"
