= Fifth Corps (game) =

Board game

The cover of the boxed edition, 1980

Fifth Corps, subtitled "The Soviet Breakthrough at Fulda", is a board wargame published by Simulations Publications, Inc. (SPI) in 1980 that simulates a hypothetical invasion of West Germany by Warsaw Pact forces. The game is the first in the Central Front series of games.

== Description ==
The Central Front series of wargames envisions a widespread invasion of West Germany in the 1980s by forces of the Warsaw Pact. Fifth Corps examines one small part of the overall operation, the strategically important Fulda Gap.

=== Components ===
The game released in Strategy & Tactics had the following components:

- 16-page rulebook (8 pages of rules common to all the Central Front games, and 8 pages of rules specific to Fifth Corps)
- 22" x 34" paper map scaled at 4 km (2.5 mi) per hex (1:250,000)
- 200 counters

=== Scenarios ===
The game comes with three scenarios

- "The Rhein-Main Raid": Strong Warsaw Pact attacks to the north and the south of the Fulda Gap have drawn away NATO forces, allowing a small Soviet force to advance through the Gap.
- "The Battle for Fulda": A strong Warsaw Pact force attempts to force the Fulda Gap before sufficient NATO reinforcements can arrive.
- "Fifth Corps": Warsaw Pact tank divisions try to eliminate NATO forces defending the Fulda Gap.

== Publication history ==
Map showing planned placement of all 10 games in Central Front series. The locations of the only games published by SPI (Fifth Corps, Hof Gap, and BAOR) are marked with bold borders.

In 1980, SPI announced a series of ten games titled the Central Front series that would simulate a Warsaw Pact invasion along the entire length of the border between East and West Germany. The first five games would cover the border, and the next five games would cover the area to the west of the first games, as the invasion progressed.

The first game in this series was Fifth Corps, designed by Jim Dunnigan, with cartography and graphic design by Redmond A. Simonsen. The game was released as a pullout in issue 82 of Strategy & Tactics (September/October 1980), and was also released as a boxed set.

SPI published two more games in the series, Hof Gap (1980) and BAOR (1981) before they were taken over by TSR and work on the series ended. Two more games in the series, North German Plain (1988) and Donau Front (1989), were published by 3W (World Wide Wargames), but using simplified rules. The final five games in the series originally envisioned by SPI were never created or published.

== Reception ==
In Issue 39 of The Space Gamer, Nick Schuessler commented that "Central Front is a 'simulation' and strictly for the hardcore NATO types [and is] SPI's best effort to date in this area, and the intended audience should be well pleased."

In Issue 54 of Moves, Anthony G. Curtis thought that Fifth Corps "breaks a lot of new ground in its treatment of warfare in Germany in the 1980s" and highlighted several new concepts used in the game. He analyzed each of the scenarios, and called the "Fifth Corps" scenario "the most challenging of them all." He concluded that the rules have some "rough spots", especially around tactical nuclear weapons, but overall he felt the game drives home the point that "the Warsaw Pact possesses a significant numerical superiority. The NATO player cannot escape feeling how it is to fight outnumbered."

In Issue 34 of Phoenix, Donald Mack noted that "The system is basically simple and there is little chrome." Despite this, he pointed out that games were not short. "Lengthy turns are inherent in the one-at-a-time system [...] The 'short' scenarios can be longish and the full ones can be very long indeed and can bog down completely." However, Mack said players who were willing to invest the time "will find that they are dealing with an absorbing package which combines ingenuity and depth with a refreshing lack of complexity rare in 'modern' games."

== Awards ==
At the 1981 Origins Awards, Fifth Corps was a Charles S. Roberts Award finalist in the category "Best Twentieth Century Game of 1980".

== Other reviews ==
- Fire & Movement #25
- The Complete Wargames Handbook
