= The 7th Continent =

Board game

The 7th Continent is a 2017 storytelling cooperative board game designed by Ludovic Roudy and Bruno Sautter.

The game was crowdfunded through the Kickstarter platform, where it became one of the most funded projects of that year, raising over 5 million USD in less than 24 hours.

== Gameplay ==
The 7th Continent is inspired by adventure books within which players are able to make their own survival decisions. This aligns with the tagline of the game, "YOU are the hero". It can be played individually or with up to four individual players or teams. Players can progress through the game at their preferred pace; it features a save system that allows for the game to be paused and re-started where left off. Each player can save the items they have collected, along with their action deck and terrain card. The game requires players to use a combination of survival skills through the game. These survival skills include hunting, fishing, crafting items, using the current environment of player to advantage, and gaining experience points to trade for new skills. Players go through a different adventure each time the game is played due to the multiple possible random events and alternatives that are possible for any single card. Players can be both easily added and dropped out of a game. The game is designed to be played with cards and dice.

The game exists in a universe where a mysterious land has been discovered off the coast of Antarctica known as the seventh continent. Within this story, each player is an explorer who has just returned from the first expedition to the seventh continent. Several other members of this expedition group have disappeared suddenly upon their return. This explorer has been feeling strange symptoms for the past few days. As the explorer falls asleep at night, they are transported back to the seventh continent where they must lift the curse they are under to resolve the situation. This point is where the board game begins for each player. The goal of the game is help lift the curses that players are fighting through the help of clues. One clue per curse is provided at the start of the game. These clue cards are shuffled into the deck. The game is furthered gradually through the use of Terrain and Event cards. Terrain or adventure cards represent a patch of land or the contents of the seventh continent that a player will explore. They also include information about the events that occur around that terrain. Action cards are played to move about and take various decisions. The action deck contains skills and items that players gain through the game, as well as cards that allow exploration of the continent. These cards also represent a player's health. Players can choose to perform actions individually or in conjunction with other players.

== Versions ==
The game is exclusively available through the Serious Poulp website. There is the option of buying a "Classic Edition" base box and a "Collector Edition" base box. The "Collector Edition" base box is exclusively available for those who helped fund the game on Kickstarter. The "Classic Edition" base box retails for $69 USD through the website. Expansion card packets are also available. Additionally, various game accessories are also available for purchase through Serious Poulp. There are also mobile apps available for the game on both the Android and the Apple platforms.

== Awards ==
- 2017 Swiss Gamers Award Winner
- 2017 Board Game Quest Awards Best Card Game Winner
