= Hof Gap =

1980 board game

Cover of SPI edition box, 1980

Hof Gap, subtitled "The Nurnberg Pincer", is a board wargame published by Simulations Publications, Inc. (SPI) in 1980 that simulates a hypothetical invasion of West Germany by Warsaw Pact forces. The game is the second in the Central Front series of games.

== Description ==
The Central Front series of wargames envisions a widespread invasion of West Germany in the 1980s by forces of the Warsaw Pact. Hof Gap examines one small part of the overall operation, the various approaches into West Germany around Nurnberg.

=== Components ===
The game has the following components:

- 16-page rulebook (8 pages of rules common to all the Central Front games, and 8 pages of rules specific to Hof Gap)
- 22" x 34" paper map scaled at 4 km (2.5 mi) per hex (1:250,000)
- 200 counters

=== Scenarios ===
The game comes with three scenarios

- "Covering Force": The first 36 hours of an invasion, using only the eastern half of the map.
- "VII Corps": Extended action using the entire map
- "Seventh Army": The map for Hof Gap s joined to the map from sister game Fifth Corps to produce a campaign combining the two games

== Publication history ==
In 1980, SPI announced a series of ten games titled the Central Front series that would simulate a Warsaw Pact invasion along the entire length of the border between East and West Germany. The first five games would cover the border, and the next five games would cover the area to the west of the first games, as the invasion progressed.

Like the first game in this series, Fifth Corps (1980), Hof Gap was designed by Jim Dunnigan, with cartography and graphic design by Redmond A. Simonsen. The game was released as a boxed set by SPI in 1980.

SPI published one more game in the series, BAOR (1981) before they were taken over by TSR and work on the series ended. Two more games in the series, North German Plain (1988) and Donau Front (1989), were published by 3W (World Wide Wargames), but using much simplified rules. The final five games in the series originally envisioned by SPI were never created or published.

== Reception ==
Nick Schuessler reviewed Hof Gap in The Space Gamer No. 39. Schuessler commented that "Central Front is a 'simulation' and strictly for the hardcore NATO types [and is] SPI's best effort to date in this area, and the intended audience should be well pleased."

In Issue 34 of Phoenix, Donald Mack noted that "The system is basically simple and there is little chrome." Despite this, he pointed out that games were not short. "Lengthy turns are inherent in the one-at-a-time system [...] The 'short' scenarios can be longish and the full ones can be very long indeed and can bog down completely." However, Mack said players who were willing to invest the time "will find that they are dealing with an absorbing package which combines ingenuity and depth with a refreshing lack of complexity rare in 'modern' games."

== Other reviews ==
- Fire & Movement #25
