= Death and Destruction (board game) =

Death and Destruction is a 1980 board game published by Uncontrollable Dungeon Master.

== Gameplay ==
Death and Destruction is a game where two or more players on each side of the board have 32 pieces, each of them with a different name and abilities and represented by poker chips.

== Reception ==
Steve Jackson reviewed Death and Destruction in The Space Gamer No. 34. Jackson commented that "If you like chess (and its complex variants), this game is worth attention, even at its rather high price. If you don't like chess and similar games, D and D will hold nothing for you. It's a fascinating effort, but its production and playtest flaws will probably keep it from going far. Pity."
