= The War of the Worlds (board game) =

Board game

The War of the Worlds is a 1980 board wargame published by Task Force Games.

== Gameplay ==
The War of the Worlds is a game in which humans defend Victorian London from Martian invaders.

== Video game ==
Task Force Games developed a 16K computer version of The War of the Worlds, developed for the Atari 400 and Atari 800 as well. It was published in 1983.

== Reception ==
Tony Watson reviewed The War of the Worlds in The Space Gamer No. 35. Watson commented that "TWotW does a good job of taking an interesting but very unbalanced situation and making it into a fun game."

Eric Goldberg reviewed War of the Worlds in Ares Magazine #9 and commented that "If the players can accept the radical revisions to the plot of the novel, they have a game which should prove tense for the first five or so plays. After that, War of the Worlds is a solved puzzle."
