= Forest Wars of the Haven =

Forest Wars of the Haven is a 1980 board game published by Attack International.

== Gameplay ==
Forest Wars of the Haven is a fantasy game based on a novel by Graham Diamond.

== Reception ==
Robert G.F. Marrinan reviewed Forest Wars of the Haven in The Space Gamer No. 31. Marrinan commented, "This is one of the worst games that I've ever played. It could be a good cure for insomnia. Under no conditions would I play it ever again."
