= Tau Ceti 2015 AD =

1980 board game

Tau Ceti 2015 AD is a 1980 board game published by Swedish Game Production.

== Gameplay ==
Tau Ceti 2015 AD is a game involving near future tactical combat between the Kraa and H'ren, alien races inhabiting a planet of Tau Ceti.

== Reception ==
William A. Barton reviewed Tau Ceti 2015 AD in The Space Gamer No. 36. Barton commented that "So while Tau Ceti 2015 AD does have its assets and will undoubtedly have it champions, the liabilities make the asking price [...] a bit too steep - unless you want to buy the game as a gesture toward improving international relations."
