= Journey (board game) =

Board game

Journey: A Quest for Galactic Power is a 1980 board game published by Grenadier Models.

== Gameplay ==
Journey is part of the "Great Little Game Line" series, and this is a game in which ships from multiple worlds are attempting to obtain the coveted plienthium mangate from the Epsilon Cygni II system.

== Reception ==
Tony Watson reviewed Journey in The Space Gamer No. 31. Watson commented that "Despite the interesting use of cards, I can't find much to recommend in this game. Most gamers will tire of it quickly, and the price [...] would be much better spent, in terms of play value, in picking up two or three of the various Micros and capsule-format games on the market."
