= King of the Mountain (board game) =

Board game

Cover art by Michael Carroll

King of the Mountain is a fantasy board game published by Dimension Six in 1980.

== Description ==
King of the Mountain is a game for 2 to 10 players. One of the players takes on the role of the wizard Promonthorius, who tries to kill anyone who attempts to climb the Mountain, using magic and fell creatures. The other players represent the adventurers who strive to be the first to reach the summit of the Mountain and enter the Citadel at the Peak.

The mountain terrain is set out on a mounted 29" x 22" hex grid mapboard. 156 die-cut counters represent player characters, monsters, armor, shields, tunnels and weapons.

Players have a choice of immediately and quickly moving up the mountain slopes, inevitably facing several monsters, or moving through the mountain tunnels, which are safer, but much slower. Regardless of choice, all adventurers must climb the last third of the Mountain up its slopes.

If the wizard kills all the adventurers, the wizard wins. Otherwise, the first adventurer to each the summit of the mountain wins the game.

== Publication history ==
King of the Mountain was designed by Mike Dinacola, who claimed to have never played either a wargame or a fantasy game before designing the game. The game was playtested by the Denver Gamers Association before being published by Dimension Six in 1980 with cover art by Michael Carroll.

== Reception ==
In Issue 36 of The Space Gamer (February 1981), David Ladyman commented that "King of the Mountain has several commendable features; it is certainly a playable game." But Ladyman also noted "The map doesn't always coincide with the hex grid. The counters are oversized. The mapboard begins to fray at the folds after 10 or more games. The graphics are bland." Ladyman concluded, "The greatest drawback might be the suggested price ... at $8 I might recommend it, at $15, I won't."

In Issue 44 of Dragon, Mark Simmons called this "a strategy game of moderate complexity." Simmons noted that although the role of the killer wizard would seem to be the easiest, in fact "This is difficult at best when one or two characters get into the tunnels. When this happens, the Wizard must rely on the smell-sense of his subterranean allies."

In Issue 15 of Simulacrum, Joseph Scoleri expressed disappointment in this game, commenting that he should have resisted buying it. "Despite the mounted mapboard, King of the Mountain is a low budget, bare bones fantasy game at heart; and perhaps it would have fared better as a ziplock minigame." Scoleri didn't think much of the story or the components, saying, "King of the Mountain's sketchy background story is generic and lifeless, something that generally spells disaster for a fantasy game. The monochrome counters don't do much to draw the player in either, and they look even more out of place on a full color mapboard which uses a realistic Squad Leader style depiction of the terrain." Scoleri noted that the game developer claimed never to have played another fantasy game in his life and concluded, "It shows."
