= Bulge (game) =

1980 World War II board game

Original cover of edition titled "Bulge"

Bulge, subtitled "The Battle for the Ardennes, 16 Dec. '44 – 2 Jan. '45", and also published as The Big Red One: The Game of the First Infantry Division at the Battle of the Bulge, is a board wargame published by Simulations Publications Inc. (SPI) in 1980 that simulates the World War II German offensive in December 1944 known as the Battle of the Bulge.

== Background ==
In December 1944, Allied intelligence believed that German forces were close to collapse and were incapable of mounting an attack. However, German forces surprised the Allies with a major offensive through the Ardennes that had the combined objectives of splitting the Allied forces in two, preventing the use of the port of Antwerp, and forcing the Allies to sue for peace. German forces managed to create a large salient in Allied lines (the "Bulge") before the attack was blunted and stopped, the Germans' objectives unfulfilled.

== Description ==
Bulge is a two-player microgame that uses a small map and relatively few counters to simulate the Battle of the Bulge. Victory conditions are checked at the end of each turn, and if either side has attained them, the game is immediately over.

=== Components ===
The game box contains:

- 11" x 17" paper hex grid map scaled at 200 yd (183 m) per hext
- 100 double-sided die-cut counters
- 8-page rule booklet
- Game Turn record
- Player reference sheet

=== Gameplay ===
Each Game Turn represents 24 hours. The rules come with a series of linked scenarios that simulate each phase of the battle.

=== Victory conditions ===
Each player earns Victory Points for destruction of enemy units. In addition, the German player gains Victory Points for exiting units off of the map along a road. At the end of each turn, Allied Victory Points are subtracted from German Victory Points. If the resultant difference is larger than the German Victory number on the Game Turn Track, then the German player immediately wins the game. If the number is less than the American Victory number, then the American player immediately wins the game.

If the game ends after Turn 18 without a winner, then the battle ends in a stalemate.

Cover of "The Big Red One" edition

== Publication history ==
Bulge: The Battle for the Ardennes, 16 Dec '44–2 Jan '45 was game designer Jim Dunnigan's fourth game about the Battle of the Bulge, and the sixth "Bulge" game published by SPI. This version with graphic design by Redmond A. Simonsen was published in January 1980. As a relatively short microgame, it differed substantially in both look and play from its much larger and longer predecessors.

The movie The Big Red One was released later the same year, portraying the story of the First Infantry Division from D-Day to the end of the war. SPI acquired a game license for a movie tie-in, repackaged Bulge with new cover art, and re-issued it as The Big Red One: The Game of the First Infantry Division at the Battle of the Bulge in November 1980.

After the demise of SPI, several companies acquired the rights to the game. Decision Games published a revised edition designed by Ty Bomba, first released in Issue 3 of World at War magazine in 2008, and then re-released as a boxed set in 2021. Kokusai-Tsushin Co. (国際通信社) published a Japanese language edition of The Bulge in 2016.

== Reception ==
In Issue 45 of the British wargaming magazine Perfidious Albion, Charles Vasey commented, "Low unit density makes it a game for the tactical-position player. Another of SPI's small games (like Demons and Deathmaze) which look to be grabbing a share of the market like crazy."

In Issue 26 of Phoenix, Roger Musson called the game "excellent fun." Although several other reviewers believed the game was unbalanced in favor of the Germans, Musson thought American defensive rules made up for German offense. He concluded that Bulge was perfect for gamers looking for a break from large ("monster") games, saying it was "quick-acting, and playable in around two hours or so. An excellent antidote to Monster indigestion."

In Issue 34 of Phoenix, Roger Gibson thought the Combat Result Table was unbalanced in favor of the Germans. Nonetheless, he concluded that "For a quick bout of major-generalship, Bulge is a good, fast simulation and very enjoyable."

In Issue 52 of Moves, Claude Bloodgood liked the easily learned game mechanics, and thought that the two combat phases "provide for a fast-paced game." Like other critics, he also believed the game was unbalanced in favor of the Germans. Nevertheless, he concluded "This is an excellent game-system that will not distract player attention away from playing the game."

== Other reviews ==
- Fire & Movement #22 & #65
- The Wargamer Vol.2 #17
- Campaign #99
- Casus Belli #5
