= Panzer Pranks =

Humorous WWII tabletop wargame

WWII as it actually was in the movies
- Cover art by Rodger B. MacGowan
- Designers: Steve Lortz; Kurt Lortz
- Illustrators: Rodger B. MacGowan
- Publishers: Chaosium
- Publication: 1980; 46 years ago
- Genres: Comedic WWII board wargame

Panzer Pranks, subtitled "WWII as it actually was in the movies", is a light-hearted board wargame published by Chaosium in 1980 that satirizes the tropes found in board wargames. Some critics characterized it as an extended satire rather than as a game to be played.

== Gameplay ==
Panzer Pranks is a comedic combat simulation game that satirizes the conventions of standard board wargames. As British critic Charles Vasey noted, "The basic concept is to take all the cliches of armoured warfare games and take the mickey out of them [mock or ridicule them] relentlessly." For example, for greater accuracy during artillery fire, the attacker must make the correct noise. A howitzer requires "Bamm, wafflewafflewaffle, crump".

Ten scenarios range from panzer attacks in 1919 Missouri, to a 1944 German assault against the American 1118th infantry division ("The Fighting Beavers").

== Publication history ==
Panzer Pranks was designed by Steve and Kurt Lortz, and was published by Chaosium in 1980 as a paperback booklet with cover art by Rodger B. MacGowan.

== Reception ==
In Issue 46 of the British wargaming magazine Perfidious Albion, Charles Vasey noted, "The rules are actually well-written and do constitute a real game, whether anyone will ever play it is another matter. The thing exists more as the fantasy-player's revenge on tankies, but as fantasy players are unlikely to buy it and it may well annoy the tankies, its public must be those with enough spare loot to buy what must be a very expensive paperback." Vasey concluded, "For all that, it is a very witty work indeed."

In Issue 28 of The Space Gamer, Joseph M. Hurst commented, "This game is a lot more fun to read than to play. It is a satire on simulation mania, and uses both rapier and bludgeon freely and sometimes simultaneously."

In Issue 98 of Campaign, John Olsen was thoroughly amused by this game, and , unlike other critics, thought there it a playable game. After a lengthy examination of the game, Olsen concluded, "I think the Lortzes have done a great job on this game and deserve a warm round of applause from those of us with a sense of humor. This is my kinda fun game, it even encourages the players to make their own sound effects to aid play."

In Issue 43 of White Wolf (May 1994), Ken Rolston commented, "The charm of Panzer Pranks (subtitled 'WWII as it actually was in the movies') is in the cheerful rules and design. As far as I know, this is the first wargame to include a 'Glossary of Sound Effects and Key Phrases.'"
