= The Wreck of the B.S.M. Pandora =

1980 science fiction board game

The Wreck of the BSM Pandora
- Cover of the boxed edition, 1980
- Designers: Jim Dunnigan
- Illustrators: Redmond A. Simonsen
- Publishers: Simulations Publications Inc.
- Publication: 1980
- Genres: Science fiction

The Wreck of the B.S.M. Pandora is a cooperative science fiction board game published by Simulations Publications, Inc. (SPI) in 1980.

== Description ==
The B.S.M. Pandora, a biological survey mission space ship in the distant future, has crash-landed on a planet during its mission to collect alien life forms. The crew faces two dangers: if the ship systems fail, they will die; and the dangerous alien life forms they had been transporting have escaped and are now roaming the ship. In this cooperative game, 1–5 players act as crew members trying to find tools to repair the spacecraft before the systems fail, as well as searching for weapons to kill or recapture the escaped aliens.

=== Components ===
The game comes with:

- 11" x 17" paper map of the ship
- 100 die-cut counters
- rulesheet

The boxed set also contains two 6-sided dice.

== Publication history ==
SPI published The Wreck of the B.S.M. Pandora in the May 1980 edition of Ares (Issue 2), a game designed by Jim Dunnigan, with artwork by Joe Barney and Redmond A. Simonsen. The game was also released as a boxed set.

Seven months later, SPI published a prequel game, Voyage of the B.S.M. Pandora, in the January 1981 edition of Ares (Issue 6), to explain how the ship had collected the aliens before it crashed. A boxed version of it was also released.

In Issue 8 of Ares, Justin Leites explained how to combine the two games into a single campaign game by starting with Voyage, collecting alien species, then after the Pandora suffers an accident, the players switch to Wreck, but replacing the aliens given in the game rules with the aliens they captured in the first part of the game.

== Reception ==
In Issue 47 of the British wargaming magazine, Perfidious Albion, Charles Vasey was not impressed, writing, It may be good Science Fiction but its damn boring as a game. There are two ways to regard this problem; (1) if you will only play it twice at the most it will keep you amused, if you intend to play it more than (2) its about as much fun as a Klingon blind date. You see my dears, its so samey. You march around discovering the space-ship as in a solitaire dungeon, but with the knowledge that the whole damn thing is random. You really are treading boldly but to no good purpose."

In Issue 31 of The Space Gamer, Craig Barber commented that "For solitaire gamers, WOTP is a good game choice. The game plays best with very few crew members running around. I would recommend this as a good one-person game."

In Issue 51 of Moves, Redmond A. Simonsen wrote, "I have an intuitive feeling that this form of Pandora may turn out to be the most popular of all — the sides are so clearly drawn, the victory conditions so primal. Who amongst us hasn't at one time or another wished to be an all powerful monster, stalking the puny humans in the shadowy claustrophobic confines of a death-trap space ship?"
