= Space Warrior (board game) =

Space warrior

Space Warrior is a 1980 board game published by Argon Games.

== Gameplay ==
Space Warrior is a science fiction game of combat where players can either be a boarding party or play as the crew defending their ship.

== Reception ==
Jerry Epperson reviewed Space Warrior in The Space Gamer No. 38. Epperson commented that "Space Warrior could have used a little more work in the playtest and editing. If you don not like simple 'move-in-kill-it-and-move-on' games, it is not for you. I would suggest Snapshot as a better alternative."
