= The Longest Day (game) =

Board game

- The Longest Day front cover, cover art by Rodger B. MacGowan
- Designers: Randall C. Reed
- Illustrators: Rodger B. MacGowan, Randall C. Reed
- Publishers: The Avalon Hill Game Corporation
- Publication: 1979
- Genres: Military simulation
- Players: 2-8
- Setup time: 8-10 hours or more
- Playing time: 3-15 hours for regular scenarios, 50-90 hours for campaign
- Chance: High
- Age range: 12+
- Synonyms: TLD

The Longest Day is a board wargame published by Avalon Hill in 1979 that simulates the Allied D-Day invasion of June 1944 and the subsequent Normandy campaign during World War II until August 31, 1944.

== Background ==
In early June 1944, Allied forces landed on the beaches of Normandy. Although German forces were not able to eliminate the beachhead, they were able to contain Allied forces within the Cotentin Peninsula for almost 8 weeks. The Allies finally broke out with simultaneous attacks by British and Canadian forces (Operation Goodwood) and American forces (Operation Cobra).

== Description ==
The Longest Day is a "monster game" (one having more than 1000 counters) for 2–8 players (or two teams) that covers the Allied Operation Overlord from the Normandy invasion on 6 June 1944, to the Battle of the Falaise Gap in August 1944. Wargame Academy rates the game's complexity as 6 on a scale of 10 and estimates that a campaign game would take 30–50 hours to complete, while Avalon Hill rates the game's complexity as 8 on a scale of 10 and estimates that the game would take 50–90 hours to complete.

=== Components ===
The large game box is 14.25 inches x 11.25 inches x 2.5 inches, weighs nine pounds (4.1 kg) and contains:

- Seven mounted mapboards scaled at 2 km (1.2 mi) per hex with up to 16 types of terrain. When used together for the campaign game, the maps cover a total area of almost 14 square feet (1.3 square meters)
- Over 2200 die-cut counters using German military symbols to differentiate types of units
- Several tables, including Reinforcement and unit entry tracks, a Combat Results Table (CRT) and a Remnant Exchange Table
- Several booklets, including "Rules of Play", "Question Box", and unit placements
- Four scenario sheets

== Gameplay ==
Each turn uses the following sequence:

- Allied movement
- German mechanized movement
- Allied combat
- German movement
- Allied mechanized movement
- German Combat

This completes one turn, which represents one day.

=== Scenarios ===
The game includes five scenarios that range in playing time from 3 to 12 hours and increase in complexity with the addition of new rules for each scenario:

1. Normandy Beachhead (6 June-8 June) (Played with every mapboard)
2. Fall of Cherbourg (19 June-25 June) (Played with mapboard "A")
3. Operation Cobra (25 July-31 July) (Played with mapboard "A", "B", "C", and "F")
4. Mortain Counterattack (6 August-9 August) (Played with mapboard "F")
5. Falaise Pocket (17 August-21 August) (Played with mapboard "G")

There is also a complete Campaign Game.

There are six hypothetical "what-if?" add-ons included that simulate events that historically did not happen but were considered at the time as possible strategies by the relevant commands. These include a second Allied airdrop (which would later become a part of the regular Campaign scenario rules), Hitler abandoning the Channel Islands in order to reinforce Normandy, and moving German units quite close to beachheads before the invasion (General Erwin Rommel's original counter-invasion plan).

There are three optional rules that can be added onto the Campaign Game: Counter-Battery Artillery Fire, Bridge Demolition and Repair, and Hedgerow Cutters.

== Publication history ==
Randall C. Reed, the head of Avalon Hill's research and development staff in the late 1970s, was one of the first new Avalon Hill employees after the Charles S. Roberts era. Reed designed The Longest Day, including the counters and maps. The game was published by Avalon Hill in 1979 with cover art by Rodger B. MacGowan.

The game was published with some counters missing. These were included in The General, Vol. 28, No. 6.

== Reception ==
In Issue 50 of the British wargaming magazine Perfidious Albion, Charles Vasey questioned the historicity of this game, noting, "If you read the blurb on the box, if you cast an eye over the bibliography and the notes, you may be left with the impression that The Longest Day is the last word in historical research, there are however a number of historical errors, and a number of historically suspect design decisions, which between them could be the subject of a historical essay in themselves." Although admitting the game was complex, Vasey commented, "It is playable! It is hard work though, as much because of bulk as of complexity. In fact, once you get going, the rules seem relatively simple. There are certain aspects of the game that can best be described as 'subtle', where play gives the impression of being more straightforward than it really is." Vasey concluded, "Overall, as a wargamer, I remain quite pleased with the game, although it is very expensive, and I could not recommend it as value for money to anyone except those particularly interested in the subject, or with lots and lots of gaming time.

In Issue 33 of the British wargaming magazine Phoenix, Geoffrey Barnard examined the historicity of the game and found that it was inaccurate in several areas. This included geographical errors (9 of 11 British/Canadian landing beaches were incorrectly named), rules that do not accurately represent possible actions, and strategic errors. Barnard nevertheless concluded, "It is worth playing and, even more so, it is worth studying [...] The game is, I feel, a valuable contribution to the advance of game design, even if just because it sets out to be, or at least seem, historically serious."

In Issue 6 of Richard Berg's Review of Games, game designer Richard Berg noted that this was "not a complex game — there are no convoluted mechanics to learn, no tortuous CRT's to dissect, and no roster sheets full of minutiae to keep track of." Berg thought the first scenario (the Normandy landings) was the most interesting for players, given that the length of time to complete the entire campaign game "is an extensive proceeding that will appeal to few because of the time and energy required." However, Berg found "The set-up system is abysmal — there appears to be a fair number of holes and glitches in the initial set-up." Berg also found the set-up time to be overly long, writing, "It actually takes less time to learn how to play the game than to set it up ... [But] once over that formidable wall and into the game, most players will find the assimilation of the system easy going." Berg added onto this by saying that "...for those gamers for whom extended and difficult set-ups are a major bugaboo, TLD should be avoided like a Care package from Tehran."

== Other reviews and commentary ==
- Casus Belli, No. 6 (Dec 1981)
- Campaign, No. 94 & No. 103
- Fire & Movement, No. 65
- The Grenadier, No. 13
- PanzerFaust, No. 63
- Richard Berg's Review of Games, No. 4
