= Citadel of Blood =

Board game

Cover of boxed set

Citadel of Blood, subtitled "Fantastic Adventure in the Fortress of Evil," is a dungeon-crawl board game published by Simulations Publications, Inc. (SPI) in 1980.

== Description ==
Citadel of Blood is a cooperative fantasy dungeon crawl where 1–6 players enter the dungeon of the evil wizard "X the Unknown," kill any monsters encountered and take their treasure. Unlike fantasy role-playing games with a dungeon-crawl theme such as Dungeons & Dragons, Citadel of Blood does not need a gamemaster to design the dungeon and play the monsters within during combat, nor does it use numbered paragraphs as were used in Flying Buffalo's Buffalo Castle expansion for Tunnels & Trolls. Rather, the players randomly draw tiles representing rooms and corridors one at a time as they progress, slowly building up the dungeon tile by tile.

This game is based on SPI's previous publication Deathmaze, but with the addition of character races, dungeon levels and different "colors" of magic depending upon phases of the moon.

== Publication history ==
SPI published Deathmaze in January 1980, a dungeon-crawl board game designed by Greg Costikyan and Redmond A. Simonsen. Eric Smith then modified the game, adding variations of races and magic. The result, Citadel of Blood, was published as a pullout game in Ares Magazine #5 (November 1980), then released as a boxed set.

The game was published in 1982 in Poland as Labirynt Śmierci; it contained a number of changes, including replacing the titular citadel with a labyrinth. It was one of the first, if not the first, "serious" board game published in Poland, and likely contributed to the growing popularity of both board games and role-playing games in that market.

== Reception ==
Keith Gross reviewed Citadel of Blood in The Space Gamer No. 37. Gross commented that "Citadel of Blood is recommended to fans of Deathmaze and to fantasy gamers who want something to play when they don't have the time for a bigger game."

In Issue 54 of Moves (December–January 1981), Jules Leites commented that the redesign of Citadel of Blood lifted it above Deathmaze, making it "much more nearly state of the art than its simpler predecessor, and it is capable of challenging even the most advanced [fantasy role-playing] gamers." He also pointed out that SPI's previously published Swords & Sorcery boardgame (1978) had separate "Army" and a "Quest" games, and suggested a set of rule variants for Citadel of Blood to allow it to be used as a link between those two parts.

The Polish edition received several reviews as well.
