= Time Tripper (board game) =

Board game

Cover art by Jow Barney

Time Tripper is a science fiction board game published by Simulations Publications, Inc. (SPI) in 1980.

== Gameplay ==
Time Tripper is a game for 1-4 players, where each player controls a Vietnam War era American GI who inaccurately manipulates the time flux and is transported to a significant battle in either the past or the future. If he survives the battle, the soldier then tries re-manipulate the time flux, either returning to his own time, or being randomly transported to another battle.

The game includes a box, a rulebook, a map with two time displays (for the past and future) that include 36 "time locations", and counters for the soldiers, their equipment, and the creatures and soldiers they encounter.

== Reception ==
In the September 1980 edition of The Space Gamer (Issue No. 31), Keith Gross admired the refreshingly novel nature of Time Tripper, saying, "[It] is one of the few non-Swords-and-Sorcery fantasy games. Its design is highly innovative. Timetripper is highly recommended for all fantasy or s-f gamers who want to try something out of the ordinary."

In the October 1980 edition of Dragon (Issue 42), Tony Watson also liked the innovative nature of the game, as well as its value as a solitaire game: "Time Tripper is a fun game. The idea is novel, the encounters are interesting without taking themselves too seriously, and the game is varied enough so that it never gets boring. It’s also a fine solitaire game, and that’s a big plus for those gamers who have a difficult time meeting with opponents."

== Awards ==
At the 1981 Origins Awards, Timetripper was a finalist for the Charles S. Roberts Award for "Best Fantasy or Science-Fiction Board Game of 1980."

== Other reviews and commentary ==
- The Wargamer Vol.1 #17
- Campaign #101
- Richard Berg's Review of Games #5
