= The Mystic Wood =

Board game

The Mystic Wood is a board game by Peter Donnelly published in 1980 by Philmar Ltd., and in 1983 by The Avalon Hill Game Company.

== Gameplay ==
The Mystic Wood is a game in which knights from the age of chivalry journey through both normal and enchanted woods on a personal quest.

== Publication history ==
Fantasy Games Unlimited became the American distributor for Philmar/Ariel Games in the late 1970s, and were therefore able to distribute Mystic Wood, although a new edition was published two years later by Avalon Hill.

== Reception ==
Andy Davidson reviewed the Philmar version of The Mystic Wood for White Dwarf #20, giving it an overall rating of 9 out of 10, and stated that "This game is similar to Terence Donnelly's other fine adventure game, Sorcerer's Cave, but is a much cleaner, tighter design. It is simple enough to be a good fun game but is sufficiently complex to allow the development of different strategies and interesting tricks. Most important, it seems to lack the aimlessness that characterises most of these adventure games. I recommend it highly."

Steve Condit reviewed the Avalon Hill version of The Mystic Wood in Space Gamer No. 73. Condit commented that "The Mystic Wood is a good beer-and-pretzels game, ideal for finishing off an evening of long games. It is not good solitaire. If you enjoy Dungeon! or The Castle, buy this one; it is the best of the three."

== Reviews ==
- Games & Puzzles #80
