= Deathmaze =

Board game

Original plastic bag version with artwork by Howard Chaykin, 1979

DeathMaze: Heroic Adventure in the Corridors of Doom is a fantasy board game published by Simulations Publications (SPI) in 1979 that is a dungeon crawl.

== Description ==
Deathmaze is a game for 1–6 players, in which players create a randomly laid-out monster-filled labyrinth, and then take on the role of adventurers who explore the corridors and rooms.

=== Character creation ===
Players create characters to make up an adventuring party of between 4–6 characters, choosing for each a name, a class (thief, hero, or wizard), and two weapons.

=== Gameplay ===
Unlike fantasy role-playing games such as Dungeons & Dragons that require a gamemaster to moderate the monsters and dungeon design, or games with numbered paragraphs such as Flying Buffalo's Buffalo Castle solitaire expansion for Tunnels & Trolls, players in Deathmaze draw counters to create the dungeon and its inhabitants. As monsters are encountered, players can choose to negotiate. If this fails, combat results. Combat in each encounter must continue until either all monsters or all adventurers are dead.

=== Further games ===
An adventurer that survives a game of Deathmaze increases in experience and strength for the next game.

== Publication history ==
SPI was known in the 1970s for historical board wargames, but as science-fiction- and fantasy-themed microgames gained in popularity in the late 1970s, SPI decided to enter that market with two Magic Capsule microgames in 1979: Demons; and Deathmaze. The latter was designed by Greg Costikyan, with artwork by Howard Chaykan and graphic design by Redmond A. Simonsen, and was originally released in a plastic bag. The game immediately climbed to No. 1 on SPI's Top Ten Bestseller list, and remained in the Top Ten for the rest of the year. SPI re-released the game later the same year as a boxed set. In addition, Simpubs, the British subsidiary of SPI, released its own boxed set of the game.

SPI published an expanded set of rules in Moves No. 51 (June–July 1980) entitled "Roll up for the mystery tour".

SPI game designer Eric Smith then modified the game, adding variations of races and magic. The result, Citadel of Blood, was published as a pullout game in Ares No. 5 (November 1980), then was released as a boxed set.

Following the demise of SPI, RPGamer Japan acquired the rights to Deathmaze and released a Japanese version, Death Maze: 死の迷宮, in 2003.

== Reception ==
Eric Goldberg reviewed Deathmaze in Ares Magazine No. 1, rating it a 6 out of 9. Goldberg commented that "if one ignores the premise, Deathmaze will hold the attention of the purchaser as well as any of the recent releases."

Bruce Campbell reviewed Deathmaze in The Space Gamer No. 29. Campbell commented that "Deathmaze is a good game for two specific purposes. Beginning fantasy gamers will appreciate the simple structure. After a few games, they can begin to add their own monsters or treasures and later advance to dungeon design and increased role-playing, while retaining the combat system and basic game concepts. Gamers with some experience will not find anything new in this game. However, it may provide a challenge when your usual playing partners are unavailable, since it is ideally designed for solitaire play."

In Issue 27 of Phoenix, Phil Alexander liked the random dungeon generation system, but found the dungeon counters "frustratingly small at times." He also found the dungeon, with all rooms looking much the same, as somewhat monotonous. He thought the monster counters were bland, saying, "a bit more care could have been taken in the graphics with perhaps more dynamic silhouettes being more appropriate to lend a bit of imagination to the design." His overall assessment was that "Death Maze does play through steadily and the solitaire maze system, though featureless, does work quite well." However, Alexander questioned whether this game would be a draw for traditional fantasy role-players, saying "there is no scope for characters to interact with the environment, as it is essentially passive, even if hostile. Therefore it seems unlikely that players will use roles to colour their thinking and action in the game, which is what Fantasy Role Playing is all about." But he concluded on a positive note, saying, "What we have here is not a role-playing system but straightforward 'kick-in-the-door' fantasy gaming. It's fun, fast on the whole, sometimes tense and sometimes frustrating."

In a retrospective review of Deathmaze in Black Gate, Deven Atkinson said "Yes, it is a simple game and I really like it. On those rainy days when I can't get out to hike or to work in the garden, I can see myself pulling DeathMaze off the shelf and playing a game or two."

== Other reviews ==
- Casus Belli No. 9 (June 1982)
