= List of gamebooks =

This is a list of gamebook series and individual gamebooks.

== Series ==
- ACE Gamebooks, written by Jonathan Green (10+ books planned, 7 published so far)
- Australian Adventure Gamebooks (2 books advertised but only 1 published)
- Autumn Snow, written by Martin Charbonneau and Joe Dever (3 books advertised but only 2 published)
- Battleground General, written by Alistair Smith, Jon Sutherland and Diane Canwell (2 books)
- Blood Sword, written by Dave Morris and Oliver Johnson (5 books)
- Be An Interplanetary Spy, written by Seth McEvoy and others (12 books)
- Byker Grove, written by Robert Rigby (2 books)
- Car Wars, written by Steve Jackson and others (6 books)
- Choose Your Own Adventure, written by R. A. Montgomery, Edward Packard and others (200+ books)
- The Cluster of Echoes, written by Victoria Hancox (6 books)
- Combat Heroes, written by Joe Dever (4 books)
- Cretan Chronicles, written by John Butterfield, David Honigmann and Philip Parker (3 books)
- Crossroads Adventures, written by Jody Lynn Nye and others (14 books)
- DestinyQuest, written by Michael J. Ward (6+ books planned, 5 published so far)
- Destiny's Role, written by Mark Lain (8 books planned, 4 published so far)
- Diceman comic, written and illustrated by various authors and artists (5 issues)
- Different: The Quest Continues, written by Rose Estes (1 book, Into Shadows Deep)
- Doctor Who: Decide Your Destiny, written by various authors (17 books advertised, 16 published)
- Do Over Novels, written by Heather McElhatton (2 books)
- Double Game, written by Simon Farrell and Jon Sutherland (4 books)
- Dragontales, written by Rhondi A. Vilott Salsitz as Rhondi Vilott (14 books)
- DuelMaster, written by Mark Smith and Jamie Thomson (8 books)
- Endless Quest, written by Rose Estes and others, the majority of the books based on Dungeons & Dragons (36 books)
- Escape from Tenopia, written by Edward Packard and Richard Brightfield (4 books)
- Escape from the Kingdom of Frome, written by Edward Packard and Richard Brightfield (4 books)
- Eternal Champions, written by Jamie Thomson (2 books)
- Explore-A-Quest, created by Anthony Lampe (6 books)
- Fabled Lands, written by Dave Morris and Jamie Thomson (12 books planned, 7 published so far)
- Falcon, written by Mark Smith and Jamie Thomson (6 books)
- Fantom Empires, written by Jon Sutherland (5 books advertised but only 1 published)
- Fatemaster, written by Paul Vernon (3 books advertised, 2 published)
- Fighting Fantasy, created by Steve Jackson and Ian Livingstone, written by various authors (71 books published so far)
- Fighting Fantazine magazine, written by various authors (17 issues)
- Find Your Fate (15+ books drawing from licensed franchises including Indiana Jones, Doctor Who, and James Bond, written by authors including R. L. Stine)
- Five Nights at Freddy's Interactive Novel Series (4 books planned; 3 published so far)
- Follow Your Heart Romance, written by Jan Gelman and Caroline B. Cooney (10 books)
- Football Fantasy (10 books advertised, 8 published)
- Forbidden Gateway, written by Ian and Clive Bailey (2 books)
- Freeway Warrior, written by Joe Dever (4 books)
- Gamebook Adventures, written by Simon Osbourne and Andrew Wright (3 books advertised but only 1 published)
- Ghostly, Time Travelling Gamebooks, written by Joseph Daniels (2 books)
- Give Yourself Goosebumps, written by R. L. Stine (42 books)
- Golden Dragon Fantasy Gamebooks, written by Dave Morris and Oliver Johnson (6 books)
- GrailQuest, written by J.H. Brennan (8 books)
- Hark, written by R. L. Stine (2 books)
- HeartQuest, written by various authors (6 books)
- Hellscape, written by David Lowrie (3 books advertised but only 2 published)
- HeroQuest, written by Dave Morris (3 books)
- Horror Classics, written by J.H. Brennan (2 books)
- Interactive Adventures, written by Dane Barrett (7 books)
- Just Make a Choice, written by Bob Powers (2 books)
- Knightmare, written by Dave Morris (6 books)
- Legends of Skyfall, written by David Tant (4 books)
- Lemmings Adventures Gamebooks, written by Nigel Gross and Jon Sutherland (2 books)
- Literally Immersive Gamebooks, written by James A. Hirons (6 books)
- Lone Wolf, mostly written by Joe Dever (33 books planned, 31 published so far)
- Make Your Own Adventure With Doctor Who (6 books, Sixth Doctor)
- Marvel Superheroes, written by various authors (8 books)
- Narnia Solo Games, written by various authors (7 books advertised, 5 published)
- Nintendo Adventure Books, written by various authors (12 books)
- Prince of Shadows, written by Gary Chalk and David Kerrigan (2 books)
- Proteus magazine, written by various authors (20 issues)
- Real Life Gamebooks, written by Simon Farrell and Jon Sutherland (9 books)
- Robin of Sherwood, written by Paul Mason and Graham Staplehurst (2 books)
- Sagard the Barbarian, written by Gary Gygax and Flint Dille (4 books)
- Sagas of the Demonspawn, written by J.H. Brennan (4 books)
- Savage Realms Gamebooks, written by TroyAnthony Schermer, James A. Hirons, H.L. Truslove, David Lowrie, Mark Lain, Paul Partington, and Rose Estes (13 books published)
- Sonic the Hedgehog Adventure Gamebooks, written by various authors (6 books)
- Sorcery!, written by Steve Jackson (4 books)
- Spellcaster Gamebooks, written by Louisa Dent (3 books advertised but only 1 published)
- Star Wars: The Last Jedi, written by Paul Cockburn (2 books)
- Starlight Adventures, written by various authors (6 books)
- Steam Highwayman, written by Martin Noutch (3 books)
- Survivor, written by various authors (4 books)
- SwordQuest, written by Bill Fawcett (4 books)
- Time Machine, written by Jim Gasperini and others (25 books)
- Tolkien Quest, also known as Middle-earth Quest, set in the world of J.R.R. Tolkien's Middle-earth (13 books advertised, 7 published)
- Two-Fisted Fantasy, written by Herman S. Skull (2 books)
- Twistaplot, written by R. L. Stine and Douglas Colligan, among others (18 books)
- Twisted Journeys, written by Dan Jolley and others (22 books)
- Usborne Adventure Gamebooks, written by various authors (3 books published, 4th book due in 2024)
- Usborne Puzzle Adventures, written by Jenny Tyler and others (25 books)
- Virtual Reality, written by Dave Morris and Mark Smith (6 books)
- VulcanVerse, written by Dave Morris and Jamie Thomson (5 books planned, 4 published)
- Warhammer Path to Victory, written by Jonathan Green and others (4 books)
- Warlock magazine, written by various authors (13 issues)
- Way of the Tiger, written by Jamie Thomson and Mark Smith (8 books)
- Webs of Intrigue, written by Robin Waterfield (2 books)
- Which Way Books, written by Roland Gregory Austin, Edward Packard and Michael J. Dodge and others (24 books)
- Wizards, Warriors & You, written by R. L. Stine and others (18 books)
- World of Lone Wolf, written by Ian Page and Joe Dever (4 books)
- Zaltec, written by Yehuda Shapira (2 books)

== Individual gamebooks ==
- Alternamorphs: The First Journey, written by Tonya Alicia Martin, and The Next Passage, written by Emily Costello. Both books were spin-offs based on the Animorphs series by K. A. Applegate.
- Die Insel der Sternenbestie ("Isle of the Star Beast"), by Wolfgang Hohlbein and Karl-Ulrich Burgdorf. Set in Hohlbein's Enwor setting, the player must survive an expedition to the Mist Isle. Infamous for invariably ending horribly for the player character unless he opts to cowardly leave early on in the adventure.
- Maze, written by Christopher Manson
- Lost in Austen: Create Your Own Jane Austen Adventure, written by Emma Campbell Webster
- Life's Lottery, written by Kim Newman
- Quadportal, an anthology of four short gamebooks each comprising 100 sections, written by James Aukett
- The Dream Palace, written by Brynne Stephens
- The Oxford Oblivion: An Interactive Existential Novel About the End of the World by Adam Godwin
- To Be or Not to Be, written by Ryan North
- Witchsnare, written by Ashok Raj
- Reiter der schwarzen Sonne ("Rider of the Black Sun"), written by Swen Harder (German)
- La nuit je suis Buffy Summers, by Chloé Delaume
- Gentayangan: Pilih Sendiri Petualangan Sepatu Merahmu ("The Wandering"), written by Intan Paramaditha
