= Bibliography of Wolfgang Hohlbein =

Wolfgang Hohlbein wrote more than 200 books. All his books are written in German; only 11 of his books have been translated into English. This is the list of all books written by Wolfgang Hohlbein.

== Youth literature ==
=== Stand-alone novels ===
- Es begann am frühen Morgen (1985, Schneider, ISBN 3-505-09069-7)
- Kein Platz mehr im Hundehimmel (1986 (2004), with Heike Hohlbein, Ueberreuter, ISBN 3-8000-5111-7)
- Pizzabande - Band 17: Zucker im Tank oder Die Hehlerbande (1986, Schneider, ISBN 3-505-04126-2)
- Kunibert, der Drachentöter (2004, with Sylvia Petter, Erlebnis Lesen Verlag)
- Saint Nick - Der Tag, an dem der Weihnachtsmann durchdrehte (1997, Heyne, ISBN 3-453-14995-5)
- Teufelchen (1997, with Heike Hohlbein, Thienemann, ISBN 3-522-17297-3)
- Die wilden Schwäne (2014, with Heike Hohlbein, arsEdition, ISBN 978-3845807942)
- Drachenbrüder: Der Schwur des Dschingis Khan (2015, Ueberreuter Verlag, ISBN 978-3764170462)

=== Book series ===
Barbie

(as 'Angela Bonnella')

- 1: Barbie Superstar (1991, Xenos, ISBN 3-8212-1201-2)
- 2: Barbie in Afrika (1991, Xenos, ISBN 3-8212-1202-0)
- 3: Barbie und das Fitness-Studio (1991, Xenos, ISBN 3-8212-1203-9)

Die Wolf-Gäng

- 1: Das Haus der Geister (July 2007, Egmont Franz Schneider, ISBN 978-3-505-12408-2)
- 2: Ein finsteres Geheimnis (July 2007, with Dieter Winkler, Egmont Franz Schneider, ISBN 978-3-505-12409-9)
- 3: Wächter der Wahrheit (January 2008, with Rebecca Hohlbein, Egmont Franz Schneider, ISBN 978-3-505-12410-5)
- 4: Draci gegen die Schweinebande (September 2008, with Dieter Winkler, Egmont Franz Schneider, ISBN 978-3-505-12464-8)
- 5: Die Rückkehr der Trolle (October 2008, with Rebecca Hohlbein, Egmont Franz Schneider, ISBN 978-3-505-12524-9)

Drachenthal

(with Heike Hohlbein)

- 1: Die Entdeckung (2002, Ueberreuter, ISBN 3-8000-2058-0)
- 2: Das Labyrinth (2003, Ueberreuter, ISBN 3-8000-2077-7)
- 3: Die Zauberkugel (2003, Ueberreuter, ISBN 3-8000-5032-3)
- 4: Das Spiegelkabinett (2004, Ueberreuter, ISBN 3-8000-5042-0)
- 5: Die Rückkehr (August 2007, Ueberreuter, ISBN 978-3-8000-5105-2)

Gespenst ahoi!

- 1: Ein Gespenst an Bord (1987, Schneider, ISBN 3-505-09691-1)
- 2: Die gestohlene Geisterkiste (1988, Schneider, ISBN 3-505-09771-3)
- 3: Das schottische Geisterschloß (1988, Schneider, ISBN 3-505-09772-1)
- 4: Achtung, Kamera ab! (1989, Schneider, ISBN 3-505-04125-4)
- Sammelband 1-3: Gespenst ahoi! (2002, Schneider, ISBN 3-505-11763-3)
- Sammelband 1-3: Gespenstergeschichten (1995, Schneider, ISBN 3-505-10085-4)

Norg

(with Heike Hohlbein)

- 1: Im verbotenen Land (2002, Thienemann, ISBN 3-522-17493-3)
- 2: Im Tal des Ungeheuers (2003, Thienemann, ISBN 3-522-17510-7)

Irondead

- Irondead - Der zehnte Kreis (2014, Egmont INK, ISBN 978-3863960667)
- Irondead - Der achte Tag (2015, Egmont INK, ISBN 978-3863960773)

== Fantasy ==
=== Stand-alone novels ===
- Die Bedrohung (1994, with Heike Hohlbein, Ueberreuter, ISBN 3-8000-2408-X)
- Drachenfeuer (1988, with Heike Hohlbein, Ueberreuter, ISBN 3-8000-2295-8)
- Der Drachentöter (1989, as 'Martin Heidner', Loewe, ISBN 3-7855-2269-X)
- Elfentanz (1984, with Heike Hohlbein, Ueberreuter, ISBN 3-8000-2246-X)
- Die Heldenmutter (1985, with Heike Hohlbein, Lübbe, ISBN 3-404-25267-5)
- Midgard (1987, with Heike Hohlbein, Ueberreuter, ISBN 3-8000-2281-8)
- Das Vermächtnis der Feuervögel (2003, Piper, ISBN 3-492-26508-1)
- Infinity: Der Turm (March 2011, Piper, ISBN 978-3-492-70223-2) Hörbuch ISBN 978-3-86952-079-7
- Die Schneekönigin (October 2015, arsEdition, ISBN 978-3845812021)
- Der Orkling / der Hammer der Götter (October 2013, Bastei Lübbe, ISBN 978-3404207404)
- Laurin (March 2016, Ueberreuter Verlag, ISBN 978-3764170585)

=== Book series ===
Das Herz des Waldes

- 1: Gwenderon (1987, Goldmann, ISBN 3-442-23919-2)
- 2: Cavin (1987, Goldmann, ISBN 3-442-23920-6)
- 3: Megidda (1987, Goldmann, ISBN 3-442-23921-4)
- Compilation 1-3: Gwenderon-Cavin-Megidda (1994, Weitbrecht, ISBN 3-522-71645-0)

Das Schwarze Auge - Das Jahr des Greifen (with Bernhard Hennen)

- 1: Der Sturm (1993, Bastei-Lübbe, ISBN 3-404-20222-8)
- 2: Die Entdeckung (1994, Bastei-Lübbe, ISBN 3-404-20226-0)
- 3: Die Amazone (1994, Bastei-Lübbe, ISBN 3-404-20231-7)
- Compilation Das Jahr des Greifen 1-3: Drei Romane in einem Band (1995, Bastei-Lübbe, ISBN 3-404-25270-5)

Die Asgard-Saga

- 1: Thor (2010, Bastei Lübbe, ISBN 978-3-7857-2392-0)
- 2: Die Tochter der Midgardschlange (2010, Baumhaus Verlag Köln, ISBN 978-3-8339-3901-3)

Der Drachenzyklus

- 1: Die Töchter des Drachen (1987, Bastei-Lübbe, ISBN 3-404-20152-3)
- 2: Der Thron der Libelle (1991, Bastei-Lübbe, ISBN 3-404-20306-2)
- Sammelband 1-2: Zwei Romane in einem Band (2003, Bastei-Lübbe, ISBN 3-8289-7671-9)

Wolfsnebel

- 1: Der Rabenritter (1986, Ueberreuter, ISBN 3-8000-2635-X)
- 2: Der Schattenmagier (1987, Ueberreuter, ISBN 3-8000-2877-8)

Die Nacht des Drachen

(as 'Michael Marks')

- 1: Das Drachenkind (1986, Franckh Kosmos, ISBN 3-440-05590-6)
- 2: Das Felsenvolk (1987, Franckh Kosmos, ISBN 3-440-05747-X)
- Compilation 1-2: Zwei Romane in einem Band (1998, Ueberreuter, ISBN 3-8000-2537-X)

Die Saga von Garth und Torian

Volume 1-3 together with Dieter Winkler, Volume 4-6 together with Frank Rehfeld

- 1: Die Stadt der schwarzen Krieger (1985, Goldmann, ISBN 3-442-23877-3)
- 2: Die Tochter des Magiers (1987, Goldmann, ISBN 3-442-23922-2)
- 3: Die Katakomben der letzten Nacht (1987, Goldmann, ISBN 3-442-23923-0)
- 4: Die Straße der Ungeheuer (1988, Goldmann, ISBN 3-442-23924-9)
- 5: Die Arena des Todes (1988, Goldmann, ISBN 3-442-23925-7)
- 6: Der Tempel der verbotenen Träume (1988, Goldmann, ISBN 3-442-23926-5)
- Compilation 1-3: Die Saga von Garth und Torian I (1995, Blanvalet / Goldmann, ISBN 3-442-24247-9)
- Compilation 4-6: Die Saga von Garth und Torian II (1996, Blanvalet / Goldmann, ISBN 3-442-24249-5)

El Mercenario

(Extension based on the comics of Vicente Segrelles)

- 1: Der Söldner (1992, Bastei-Lübbe, ISBN 3-404-71100-9)
- 2: Die Formel des Todes (1992, Bastei-Lübbe, ISBN 3-404-71101-7)
- 3: Die vier Prüfungen (1993, Bastei-Lübbe, ISBN 3-404-71102-5)
- 4: Das Opfer (1995, Bastei-Lübbe, ISBN 3-404-71103-3)

Enwor

(together with Dieter Winkler)

- 1: Der wandernde Wald (1983) ISBN 3-442-24947-3
- 2: Die brennende Stadt/Der Stein der Macht 1 (1983) ISBN 3-442-24948-1
- 3: Das tote Land/Der Stein der Macht 2 (1984) ISBN 3-442-24949-X
- 4: Der steinerne Wolf/Der Stein der Macht 3 (1984) ISBN 3-442-24950-3
- 5: Das schwarze Schiff (1984) ISBN 3-442-24951-1
- 6: Die Rückkehr der Götter (1987) ISBN 3-442-24952-X
- 7: Das schweigende Netz (1988) ISBN 3-442-24953-8
- 8: Der flüsternde Turm (1989) ISBN 3-442-24954-6
- 9: Das vergessene Heer (1989) ISBN 3-442-24955-4
- 10: Die verbotenen Inseln (1989) ISBN 3-442-24956-2
- 11: Das elfte Buch (1999) ISBN 3-442-24957-0

Enwor – Neue Abenteuer:

- 1: Das magische Reich (2004) ISBN 3-492-26531-6
- 2: Die verschollene Stadt (2004) ISBN 3-492-26532-4
- 3: Der flüsternde See (2005) ISBN 3-492-26533-2
- 4: Der entfesselte Vulkan (2005) ISBN 3-492-26534-0

Enwor gamebook:

- Das große Enwor Rollenspielbuch: Die Insel der Sternenbestie (1995, Goldmann, ISBN 3-442-24522-2)

Märchenmond

(with Heike Hohlbein)

- 1: Märchenmond (1982, Ueberreuter, ISBN 3-8000-2891-3)
- 2: Märchenmonds Kinder (1990, Ueberreuter, ISBN 3-8000-2889-1)
- 3: Märchenmonds Erben (1998, Ueberreuter, ISBN 3-8000-2890-5)
- Compilation 1-2: Zwei Romane in einem Band (1999, Heyne)
- Compilation 1-3: Märchenmond /with CD (July 2002, Ueberreuter)
- Das Märchen von Märchenmond (August 1999, Ueberreuter, ISBN 3-8000-2607-4)
- Die Zauberin von Märchenmond (September 2005, Ueberreuter, ISBN 3-8000-5175-3)
- Silberhorn (2009, Ueberreuter, ISBN 978-3-8000-5448-0)

Volume I to III have been translated into English:

- Magic Moon, Tokyopop, 2006, ISBN 1-59816-452-X
- Children of Magic Moon, Tokyopop, 2007, ISBN 1-59816-453-8
- Legacy of Magic Moon, Tokyopop, 2008, ISBN 1-59816-454-6

Die Chroniken der Elfen

- 1: Elfenblut (2009, Otherworld Verlag, ISBN 978-3-8000-9503-2)
- 2: Elfenzorn (2010, Otherworld Verlag, ISBN 978-3-8000-9514-8)
- 3: Elfentod (2011, Otherworld Verlag, ISBN 978-3-8000-9532-2)

== Fiction ==
=== Stand-alone novels ===
- Das Avalon-Projekt (2000, Droemer Knaur, ISBN 3-426-61866-4)
- Das Buch (August 2003, with Heike Hohlbein, Ueberreuter, ISBN 3-8000-2997-9)
- Das Druidentor (1993, Droemer Knaur, ISBN 3-426-61867-2)
- Der Greif (1989, with Heike Hohlbein, Ueberreuter, ISBN 3-8000-5214-8)
- Der Widersacher (1995, Lübbe, ISBN 3-404-25351-5 oder, ISBN 3-7857-0765-7)
- Die Rückkehr der Zauberer (1996, Droemer/Knaur, ISBN 3-426-61869-9)
- Dreizehn (1995, with Heike Hohlbein, Arena, ISBN 3-401-02897-9)
- Katzenwinter (1997, with Heike Hohlbein, Ueberreuter, ISBN 3-8000-2512-4)
- Krieg der Engel (1999, with Heike Hohlbein, Ueberreuter, ISBN 3-8000-5137-0)
- Schattenjagd (1996, with Heike Hohlbein, Heyne, ISBN 3-453-53005-5)
- Spiegelzeit (October 1991, with Heike Hohlbein).Heyne, ISBN 3-453-18925-6)
- Unterland (1992, with Heike Hohlbein, Ueberreuter, ISBN 3-8000-2057-2)
- WASP (July 2008, Ueberreuter, ISBN 978-3-8000-5436-7)

=== Book series ===
Anders

(with Heike Hohlbein)

- 1: Die tote Stadt Ueberreuter, July 2004 ISBN 3800050730
- 2: Im dunklen Land Ueberreuter, August 2004 ISBN 3800050870
- 3: Der Thron von Tiernan Ueberreuter, September 2004 ISBN 3800050889
- 4: Der Gott der Elder Ueberreuter, October 2004 ISBN 3800050897

Der Magier

- 1: Der Erbe der Nacht (1989, Heyne, ISBN 3-85492-955-2)
- 2: Das Tor ins Nichts (1989, Heyne, ISBN 3-85492-953-6)
- 3: Der Sand der Zeit (1989, Heyne, ISBN 3-85492-954-4)

Genesis

(with Heike Hohlbein)

- 1: Eis (August 2006, Ueberreuter, ISBN 3-8000-5257-1)
- 2: Stein (September 2006, Ueberreuter, ISBN 3-8000-5266-0)
- 3: Diamant (October 2006, Ueberreuter, ISBN 3-8000-5267-9)

== Historical fiction ==
=== Stand-alone novels ===
- Das Paulus-Evangelium (2006, vgs, ISBN 3-8025-3479-4)
- Das Siegel (1987, Ueberreuter, ISBN 3-8000-2280-X)
- Der lange Weg nach Ithaka (1989, unter dem Pseudonym Martin Heidner, Loewe, ISBN 3-7855-2134-0)
- Die Kinder von Troja (1984, Lübbe, ISBN 3-404-25444-9)
- Hagen von Tronje (January 1986, Heyne, ISBN 3-453-53024-1)

=== Book series ===
Das Blut der Templer

- 1: Das Blut der Templer (December 2004, vgs, ISBN 3-8025-3436-0) (based on a TV-movie aired on German channel ProSieben in fall 2004)
- 2: Die Nacht des Sterns (September 2005, with Rebecca Hohlbein, vgs, ISBN 3-8025-3478-6)

Die Himmelsscheibe

- 1: Die Tochter der Himmelsscheibe (March 2005, Piper, ISBN 3-492-70068-3)
- 2: Die Kriegerin der Himmelsscheibe (December 2010, Piper, ISBN 978-3-492-70222-5)

Die Chronik der Unsterblichen

- 1: Am Abgrund (1999, vgs, ISBN 3-8025-2667-8)
- 2: Der Vampyr (2000, vgs, ISBN 3-8025-2771-2)
- 3: Der Todesstoß (2001, vgs, ISBN 3-8025-2798-4)
- 4: Der Untergang (2002, vgs, ISBN 3-8025-2934-0)
- 5: Die Wiederkehr (2003, vgs, ISBN 3-8025-2935-9)
- 6: Die Blutgräfin (2004, vgs, ISBN 3-8025-3372-0)
- 7: Der Gejagte (2004, vgs, ISBN 978-3548263922)
- 8: Die Verfluchten (2005, vgs, ISBN 3-8025-3459-X)
- 8,5: Blutkrieg (2007, vgs, ISBN 3-8025-3624-X)
- 9: Das Dämonenschiff (2007, vgs, ISBN 978-3-8025-3539-0)
- 10: Göttersterben (2008, vgs, ISBN 978-3-8025-1793-8)
- 11: Glut und Asche (October 2009, Egmont Lyx, ISBN 978-3-8025-8248-6)
- 11,5: Seelenraub (March 2013, Egmont Lyx)
- 12: Der schwarze Tod (October 2010, Egmont Lyx, ISBN 978-3-8025-8395-7)
- 13: Der Machdi (October 2011, Egmont Lyx, ISBN 978-3-8025-8494-7)
- 14: Pestmond (14. February 2013, Egmont Lyx, ISBN 978-3-8025-8840-2)
- 15: Nekropole (17. October 2013, Egmont Lyx, ISBN 978-3802588419)

Die Legende von Camelot

(with Heike Hohlbein)

- 1: Gralszauber (2000, Ueberreuter, ISBN 3-8000-2661-9)
- 2: Elbenschwert (2001, Ueberreuter, ISBN 3-8000-2678-3)
- 3: Runenschild (2002, Ueberreuter, ISBN 3-8000-2774-7)
- Compilation 1-3: Die Legende von Camelot (2005, Ueberreuter, ISBN 3-8000-5166-4)

Die Nibelungen-Saga

(with Torsten Dewi)

- 1: Der Ring der Nibelungen (2004, Heyne, 2004, ISBN 3-453-53026-8)
- 2: Die Rache der Nibelungen (2007, Heyne, 2007, ISBN 978-3-453-53268-7)
- 3: Das Erbe der Nibelungen (2010, Heyne, 2010, ISBN 978-3-453-53333-2)
- Compilation 1-2: Die Nibelungen-Saga (Heyne, 2008, ISBN 978-3-453-53287-8)

Die Templerin

- 1: Die Templerin (1999, Heyne, ISBN 3-453-17738-X)
- 2: Der Ring des Sarazenen (2002, Heyne, ISBN 3-453-86988-5)
- 3: Die Rückkehr der Templerin (2004, Heyne, ISBN 3-453-87919-8)
- 4: Das Wasser des Lebens (2008, Heyne, with Rebecca Hohlbein, ISBN 978-3-453-26608-7)
- 5: Das Testament Gottes (2011, Heyne, with Rebecca Hohlbein, ISBN 978-3-453-26677-3)

6: 'Das Band des Schicksals' (2017, Heyne, with Rebecca Hohlbein, ISBN 978-3-453-41959-9)

Kevin von Locksley

- 1: Kevin von Locksley (1994, Bastei Lübbe, ISBN 3-404-18605-2)
- 2: Der Ritter von Alexandria (1994, Bastei Lübbe, ISBN 3-404-18606-0)
- 3: Die Druiden von Stonehenge (1995, Bastei Lübbe, ISBN 3-404-18607-9)
- 4: Der Weg nach Thule (1995, Bastei Lübbe, ISBN 3-404-18619-2)
- Compilation 1-2: Kevins Reise (2000, Lübbe)
- Compilation 3-4: Kevins Schwur (2000, Lübbe, ISBN 3-404-14392-2)
- Compilation 1-4: Zwei Romane in einem Band (2007, Lübbe, ISBN 978-3-8289-8610-7)
- Compilation 1-4: Kevin von Locksley (2009, Lübbe, ISBN 978-3-404-15962-8)

== Horror ==
=== Stand-alone novels ===
- Das Teufelsloch (1990, Heyne, ISBN 3-453-21221-5)
- Der Inquisitor (1990, Lübbe, ISBN 3-404-15203-4)
- Die Moorhexe (1988, Lübbe, ISBN 3-404-25268-3)
- Die Prophezeiung (1993, with Heike Hohlbein, Ueberreuter, ISBN 3-8000-5043-9)
- Die Schatten des Bösen (1992, Lübbe, ISBN 3-404-28319-8)
- Dunkel (May 1999, Lübbe, ISBN 3-404-14478-3)
- Geisterstunde (1991, Lübbe, ISBN 3-404-25681-6)
- Giganten (1993, with Frank Rehfeld, Lübbe, ISBN 3-404-13539-3)
- Halloween (2000, Lübbe, ISBN 3-404-25676-X)
- Videokill (1992, Goldmann, ISBN 3-442-08095-9)
- Kreuzfahrt – Eine Reise in den Horror (1988, Bastei-Lübbe, ISBN 3-404-13156-8)
- Magog (1990, Goldmann, ISBN 3-442-55359-8)
- Wolfsherz (September 1997, Lübbe, ISBN 3-404-25565-8)
- Wyrm (1998, Droemer/Knaur, ISBN 3-426-61868-0)
- Unheil (2007, Piper, ISBN 978-3-492-70156-3)
- Der Ruf der Tiefen (2014, Piper, ISBN 978-3492280051)
- Mörderhotel (2015, Bastei Lübbe, ISBN 978-3785725481)

=== Book series ===
Anubis

- 1: Anubis (January 2005, Lübbe, ISBN 3-7857-2178-1)
- 2: Horus (June 2007, Lübbe, ISBN 978-3-7857-2257-2)

Apokalypse-Trilogie

- 1: Flut (2001, Droemer/Knaur, ISBN 3-426-62150-9)
- 2: Feuer (December 2004, Droemer/Knaur, ISBN 3-426-66182-9)
- 3: Sturm (2007, Droemer/Knaur, ISBN 978-3-426-66168-0)

Azrael

- 1: Azrael (1994, Heyne, ISBN 3-453-09973-7)
- 2: Azrael – Die Wiederkehr (1998, Heyne, ISBN 3-453-13144-4)
- Compilation 1-2: Zwei Romane in einem Band (2002, Heyne, ISBN 3-453-21222-3)

Damona King

- 064: Satan's Master (1981, Bastei-Lübbe, ISBN 978-3-7325-1433-5)
- 065: In the Maze of Madness (1981, Bastei-Lübbe, ISBN 978-37325-1435-9)
- 066: The Mirror World (1981, Bastei-Lübbe, ISBN 978-3-7325-1437-3)
- 067: Damona's Dark Sister (1981, Bastei-Lübbe, ISBN 978-3-7325-1436-6)
- 071: The Stone Army (1981, Bastei-Lübbe, ISBN 978-3-7325-1438-0)
- 072: Medusa's Brother (1981, Bastei-Lübbe, ISBN 978-3-7325-1439-7)

Der Hexer von Salem

1. Robert Craven – Die Spur des Hexers (2003)
2. Robert Craven – Als der Meister Starb (2003)
3. Robert Craven – Das Haus am Ende der Zeit (2003)
4. Robert Craven – Tage des Wahnsinns (2003)
5. Robert Craven – Der Seelenfresser (2003)
6. Robert Craven – Die Chrono-Vampire (2003)
7. Robert Craven – Im Bann des Puppenmachers (2003)
8. Robert Craven – Engel des Bösen (2003)
9. Robert Craven – Dagon - Gott aus der Tiefe (2003)
10. Robert Craven – Wer den Tod Ruft (2003)
11. Robert Craven – Der achtarmige Tod (2003)
12. Robert Craven – Die Hand des Dämons (2003)
13. Robert Craven – Ein Gigant Erwacht (2003)
14. Robert Craven – Necron - Legende des Bösen (2003)
15. Robert Craven – Der Koloss von New York (2003)
16. Robert Craven – Stirb, Hexer! (2003)
17. Robert Craven – Das Auge des Satans (2004)
18. Robert Craven – Endstation Hölle (2004)
19. Robert Craven – Der Abtrünnige Engel (2004)
20. Robert Craven – Hochzeit mit dem Tod (2004)
21. Robert Craven – Der Sohn des Hexers I (2004)
22. Robert Craven – Der Sohn des Hexers II (2004)
23. Robert Craven – Das Labyrinth von London (2004)
24. Robert Craven – Das Haus der Bösen Träume (2004)

Intruder

- 1: Erster Tag (2002, Bastei-Lübbe, ISBN 3-404-14800-2)
- 2: Zweiter Tag (2002, Bastei-Lübbe, ISBN 3-404-14801-0)
- 3: Dritter Tag (2002, Bastei-Lübbe, ISBN 3-404-14802-9)
- 4: Vierter Tag (2002, Bastei-Lübbe, ISBN 3-404-14803-7)
- 5: Fünfter Tag (2002, Bastei-Lübbe, ISBN 3-404-14804-5)
- 6: Sechster Tag (2003, Bastei-Lübbe, ISBN 3-404-14805-3)
- Compilation 1-6: Intruder - Der vollständige Roman (2004, Bastei-Lübbe, ISBN 3-404-15074-0)

John Sinclair – Oculus

- 1: Oculus – Im Auge des Sturms (September 2017, Bastei Lübbe, ISBN 978-3-7325-4026-6)
- 2: Oculus – Das Ende der Zeit (October 2017, Bastei Lübbe, ISBN 978-3-7325-4940-5)

Nemesis

- 1: Die Zeit vor Mitternacht (2004, Ullstein, ISBN 3-548-25878-6)
- 2: Geisterstunde (2004, Ullstein, ISBN 3-548-25889-1)
- 3: Alptraumzeit (2004, Ullstein, ISBN 3-548-25900-6)
- 4: In dunkelster Nacht (2004, Ullstein, ISBN 3-548-25965-0)
- 5: Die Stunde des Wolfs (2004, Ullstein, ISBN 3-548-25973-1)
- 6: Morgengrauen (2004, Ullstein, ISBN 3-548-25980-4)
- Compilation 1-3: Drei Romane in einem Band (2006, Ullstein)
- Compilation 4-6: Drei Romane in einem Band (2007, Ullstein)

Professor Zamorra

- 0173: Zombie Fever (1981, Bastei-Lübbe, ISBN 978-3-7325-1169-3)
- 0183: The Man Captivated by Horror (1981, Bastei-Lübbe, ISBN 978-3-7325-1454-0)

Raven

== Science fiction ==
=== Stand-alone novels ===
- Bastard (based on a TV thriller by Manfred Purzer). Lübbe, 1989, ISBN 3-404-13220-3.
- Das Netz Heyne, 1996, ISBN 3-453-13582-2.
- Fragt Interchron! Edition Pestum, 1988, ISBN 3-401-08004-0.
- Nach dem großen Feuer Kosmos, 1984, ISBN 3-440-05386-5.

=== Book series ===
Charity

- Charity 1 - Die beste Frau der Spaceforce. Lübbe, 1989, ISBN 3-404-23096-5.
- Charity 2 - Dunkel ist die Zukunft. Lübbe, 1990, ISBN 3-404-23098-1.
- Charity 3 - Die Königin der Rebellen. Lübbe, 1990, ISBN 3-404-23100-7.
- Charity 4 - In den Ruinen von Paris. Lübbe, 1990, ISBN 3-404-23102-3.
- Charity 5 - Die schlafende Armee. Lübbe, 1990, ISBN 3-404-23104-X.
- Charity 6 - Hölle aus Feuer und Eis. Lübbe, 1990, ISBN 3-404-23106-6.
- Charity 7 - Die schwarze Festung. Lübbe, 1991, ISBN 3-404-23110-4.
- Charity 8 - Der Spinnenkrieg. Lübbe, 1991, ISBN 3-404-23115-5.
- Charity 9 - Das Sterneninferno. Lübbe, 1991, ISBN 3-404-23117-1.
- Charity 10 - Die dunkle Seite des Mondes. Lübbe, 1991, ISBN 3-404-23121-X.
- Charity 11 - Überfall auf Skytown. Lübbe, 1998, ISBN 3-404-23207-0.
- Charity 12 - Der dritte Mond. Lübbe, 1999, ISBN 3-404-23213-5.

Dark Skies

- Dark Skies - Das Rätsel um Majestic 12. vgs, 1997, ISBN 3-8025-2453-5.
- Majestic - Die Saat des Todes. vgs, 1997, ISBN 3-8025-2643-0.

Dino-Land

(Paperback series together with Frank Thys and Manfred Weinland)

Operation Nautilus

- Die vergessene Insel. Ueberreuter, 2001, ISBN 3-8000-2820-4.
- Das Mädchen von Atlantis. Ueberreuter, 2001, ISBN 3-8000-2818-2.
- Die Herren der Tiefe. Ueberreuter, 2001, ISBN 3-8000-2819-0.
- Im Tal der Giganten. Ueberreuter, 2001, ISBN 3-8000-2821-2.
- Das Meeresfeuer. Ueberreuter, 2001, ISBN 3-8000-2822-0.
- Die schwarze Bruderschaft. Ueberreuter, 2001, ISBN 3-8000-2823-9.
- Die steinerne Pest. Ueberreuter, 2002, ISBN 3-8000-2883-2.
- Die grauen Wächter. Ueberreuter, 2002, ISBN 3-8000-2879-4.
- Die Stadt der Verlorenen. Ueberreuter, 2002, ISBN 3-8000-2881-6.
- Die Insel der Vulkane. Ueberreuter, 2002, ISBN 3-8000-2880-8.
- Die Stadt unter dem Eis. Ueberreuter, 2002, ISBN 3-8000-2882-4.
- Die Rückkehr der Nautilus. Ueberreuter, 2002, ISBN 3-8000-2878-6.

Spacelords

(Together with Johan Kerk and Ingo Martin)

- Hadrians Mond. Bastei Lübbe, 1993, ISBN 3-404-23144-9.
- St. Petersburg Zwei. Bastei Lübbe, 1994, ISBN 3-404-23147-3.
- Sandaras Sternenstadt. Bastei Lübbe, 1994, ISBN 3-404-23149-X.
- Operation Mayflower. Bastei Lübbe, 1995, ISBN 3-404-23162-7.

Stargate SG-1

- Der Feind meines Feindes. Bd. 2, Burgschmiet, 1999, ISBN 3-932234-21-9.
- Kreuzwege der Zeit. Bd. 3, Burgschmiet, 2000, ISBN 3-933731-25-9.
- Jagd ins Ungewisse. Bd. 4, Burgschmiet, 2000, ISBN 3-933731-26-7.
- Unsichtbare Feinde. Bd. 5, Burgschmiet, 2001, ISBN 3-933731-67-4.
- Tödlicher Verrat. Bd. 6, Burgschmiet, 2001, ISBN 3-933731-84-4.
- Episodenguide 1 (with Frank Rehfeld), Burgschmiet, 2000, ISBN 3-933731-48-8.
- Episodenguide 2 (with Frank Rehfeld), Burgschmiet, 2001, ISBN 3-933731-68-2.

Sternenschiff der Abenteuer

(as 'Martin Hollburg')

- Der Findling im All. Bd. 1, Franckh Kosmos, 1984, ISBN 3-440-05283-4.
- Schatten an Bord. Bd. 2, Franckh Kosmos, 1984, ISBN 3-440-05294-X.
- Die eisige Welt. Bd. 3, Franckh Kosmos, 1984, ISBN 3-440-05310-5.
- Die Tiger von Vaultron. Bd. 4, Franckh Kosmos, 1984, ISBN 3-440-05368-7.
- Der Sonnenfresser. Bd. 5, Franckh Kosmos, 1984, ISBN 3-440-05371-7.
- Das Kristallhirn. Bd. 6, Franckh Kosmos, 1985, ISBN 3-440-05407-1.
- Die Zeitfalle des Delamere. Bd. 7, Franckh Kosmos, 1985, ISBN 3-440-05442-X.

== Adventure ==
Pirates of the Caribbean

(with Rebecca Hohlbein)

- 1: Fluch der Karibik (2006, = Buch zum Kinofilm, vgs, ISBN 3-8025-3540-5)
- 2: Fluch der Karibik 2 (2006, = Buch zum Kinofilm, vgs, ISBN 3-8025-3541-3)
- 3: Am Ende der Welt (April 2007, = Buch zum Kinofilm, vgs, ISBN 978-3-8025-3616-8)

Indiana Jones

- 1: Indiana Jones und die Gefiederte Schlange (1990, Goldmann, ISBN 3-442-09722-3)
- 2: Indiana Jones und das Schiff der Götter (1990, Goldmann, ISBN 3-442-09723-1)
- 3: Indiana Jones und das Gold von El Dorado (1991, Goldmann, ISBN 3-442-09725-8)
- 4: Indiana Jones und das verschwundene Volk (1991, Goldmann, ISBN 3-442-41028-2)
- 5: Indiana Jones und das Schwert des Dschingis Khan (1991, Goldmann, ISBN 3-442-09726-6)
- 6: Indiana Jones und das Geheimnis der Osterinsel (1992, Goldmann, ISBN 3-442-41052-5)
- 7: Indiana Jones und das Labyrinth des Horus (1993, Goldmann, ISBN 3-442-41145-9)
- 8: Indiana Jones und das Erbe von Avalon (1994, Goldmann, ISBN 3-442-41144-0)

Thor Garson

- 1: Der Dämonengott (July 2007, Ueberreuter, ISBN 978-3-8000-5353-7 → Vorlage: Indiana Jones und die Gefiederte Schlange)
- 2: Das Totenschiff (July 2007, Ueberreuter, ISBN 978-3-8000-5352-0 → Vorlage: Indiana Jones und das Schiff der Götter)
- 3: Der Fluch des Goldes (July 2007, Ueberreuter, ISBN 978-3-8000-5354-4 → Vorlage: Indiana Jones und das Gold von El Dorado)
- 4: Das Kristall des Todes (January 2008, Ueberreuter, ISBN 978-3-8000-5383-4 → Vorlage: Indiana Jones und das Geheimnis der Osterinseln)

== Other ==
=== Miscellaneous ===
- Das große Wolfgang Hohlbein-Buch, Bastei-Lübbe, 1994, ISBN 3-404-28220-5
- Von Hexen und Drachen, Bastei-Lübbe, 2000, ISBN 3-404-28323-6
- Der letzte Aufschlag, Goldmann, 1989, ISBN 3-442-09307-4
- Ricky jagt die Drogenhändler as 'Henry Wolf', Ueberreuter, 1994, ISBN 3-8000-2396-2

=== Movie tie-in books ===
- Die Eisprinzessin, Aufbau, 1995, ISBN 3-7466-1250-0
- Die Hand an der Wiege, Lübbe, 1992, ISBN 3-404-13453-2
- Der Fahnder, Bastei-Lübbe, 1987, ISBN 3-404-13108-8
- Wiedergeburt. "The Wanderer", Heyne, 1996, ISBN 3-453-13576-8
- Stirb langsam – jetzt erst recht, Lübbe, 1995, ISBN 3-404-13751-5
- Das Blut der Templer, Ullstein, 2006, ISBN 3-548-26474-3
- Fluch der Karibik 1–4, Egmont Vgs, 2006, ISBN 3-8025-3540-5
- Wir sind die Nacht, Heyne-Verlag, 2010, ISBN 978-3-453-26678-0

== See also ==
- Wolfgang Hohlbein
- Heike Hohlbein
