= List of Choose Your Own Adventure books =

This is a list of books in the Choose Your Own Adventure gamebook series and its various spin-off series.

== Books published by Bantam Books (1979–1998) ==
=== Choose Your Own Adventure ===
#	Title	Author	Year
1	The Cave of Time	Edward Packard	1979
2	Journey Under the Sea	R. A. Montgomery	1979
3	By Balloon to the Sahara	Douglas Terman	1979
4	Space and Beyond	R. A. Montgomery	1980
5	The Mystery of Chimney Rock	Edward Packard	1980
6	Your Code Name Is Jonah	Edward Packard	1980
7	The Third Planet from Altair	Edward Packard	1980
8	Deadwood City	Edward Packard	1980
9	Who Killed Harlowe Thrombey?	Edward Packard	1981
10	The Lost Jewels of Nabooti	R. A. Montgomery	1981
11	Mystery of the Maya	R. A. Montgomery	1981
12	Inside UFO 54-40	Edward Packard	1982
13	The Abominable Snowman	R. A. Montgomery	1982
14	The Forbidden Castle	Edward Packard	1982
15	House of Danger	R. A. Montgomery	1982
16	Survival at Sea	Edward Packard	1982
17	The Race Forever	R. A. Montgomery	1983
18	Underground Kingdom	Edward Packard	1983
19	Secret of the Pyramids	Richard Brightfield	1983
20	Escape	R. A. Montgomery	1983
21	Hyperspace	Edward Packard	1983
22	Space Patrol	Julius Goodman	1983
23	The Lost Tribe	Louise Munro Foley	1983
24	Lost on the Amazon	R. A. Montgomery	1983
25	Prisoner of the Ant People	R. A. Montgomery	1983
26	The Phantom Submarine	Richard Brightfield	1983
27	The Horror of High Ridge	Julius Goodman	1983
28	Mountain Survival	Edward Packard	1984
29	Trouble on Planet Earth	R. A. Montgomery	1984
30	The Curse of Batterslea Hall	Richard Brightfield	1984
31	Vampire Express	Tony Koltz	1984
32	Treasure Diver	Julius Goodman	1984
33	The Dragons' Den	Richard Brightfield	1984
34	The Mystery of the Highland Crest	Louise Munro Foley	1984
35	Journey to Stonehenge	Fred Graver	1984
36	The Secret Treasure of Tibet	Richard Brightfield	1984
37	War With The Evil Power Master	R. A. Montgomery	1984
38	Sabotage	Jay Leibold	1984
39	Supercomputer	Edward Packard	1984
40	The Throne of Zeus	Deborah Lerme Goodman	1985
41	Search for the Mountain Gorillas	Jim Wallace	1985
42	The Mystery of Echo Lodge	Louise Munro Foley	1985
43	Grand Canyon Odyssey	Jay Leibold	1985
44	The Mystery of Ura Senke	Shannon Gilligan	1985
45	You Are a Shark	Edward Packard	1985
46	The Deadly Shadow	Richard Brightfield	1985
47	Outlaws of Sherwood Forest	Ellen Kushner	1985
48	Spy for George Washington	Jay Leibold	1985
49	Danger at Anchor Mine	Louise Munro Foley	1985
50	Return to the Cave of Time	Edward Packard	1985
51	The Magic of the Unicorn	Deborah Lerme Goodman	1985
52	Ghost Hunter	Edward Packard	1986
53	The Case of the Silk King	Shannon Gilligan	1986
54	Forest of Fear	Louise Munro Foley	1986
55	The Trumpet of Terror	Deborah Lerme Goodman	1986
56	The Enchanted Kingdom	Ellen Kushner	1986
57	The Antimatter Formula	Jay Leibold	1986
58	Statue of Liberty Adventure	Ellen Kushner	1986
59	Terror Island	Tony Koltz	1986
60	Vanished!	Deborah Lerme Goodman	1986
61	Beyond Escape!	R. A. Montgomery	1986
62	Sugarcane Island	Edward Packard	1986
63	Mystery of the Secret Room	Ellen Kushner	1986
64	Volcano!	Meryl Siegman	1987
65	The Mardi Gras Mystery	Louise Munro Foley	1987
66	Secret of the Ninja	Jay Leibold	1987
67	Seaside Mystery	Ann Hodgman	1987
68	Secret of the Sun God	Andrea Packard	1987
69	Rock and Roll Mystery	Jim Wallace	1987
70	Invaders of the Planet Earth	Richard Brightfield	1987
71	Space Vampire	Edward Packard	1987
72	The Brilliant Dr. Wogan	R. A. Montgomery	1987
73	Beyond the Great Wall	Jay Leibold	1987
74	Longhorn Territory	Marc Newman	1987
75	Planet of the Dragons	Richard Brightfield	1988
76	The Mona Lisa is Missing!	Ramsey Montgomery	1988
77	The First Olympics	Ben M. Baglio	1988
78	Return to Atlantis	R. A. Montgomery	1988
79	Mystery of the Sacred Stones	Louise Munro Foley	1988
80	The Perfect Planet	Edward Packard	1988
81	Terror in Australia	Shannon Gilligan	1988
82	Hurricane!	Richard Brightfield	1988
83	Track of the Bear	R. A. Montgomery	1988
84	You Are a Monster	Edward Packard	1988
85	Inca Gold	Jim Becket	1988
86	Knights of the Round Table	Ellen Kushner	1988
87	Exiled to Earth	R. A. Montgomery	1989
88	Master of Kung Fu	Richard Brightfield	1989
89	South Pole Sabotage	Seddon Johnson	1989
90	Mutiny in Space	R. A. Montgomery	1989
91	You Are a Superstar	Edward Packard	1989
92	Return of the Ninja	Jay Leibold	1989
93	Captive!	Bill Hampton	1989
94	Blood on the Handle	R. A. Montgomery	1989
95	You Are a Genius	Edward Packard	1989
96	Stock Car Champion	R. A. Montgomery	1989
97	Through the Black Hole	Edward Packard	1990
98	You Are a Millionaire	Jay Leibold	1990
99	Revenge of the Russian Ghost	Jay Leibold	1990
100	The Worst Day of Your Life	Edward Packard	1990
101	Alien, Go Home!	Seddon Johnson	1990
102	Master of Tae Kwon Do	Richard Brightfield	1990
103	Grave Robbers	Ramsey Montgomery	1990
104	The Cobra Connection	Louise Munro Foley	1990
105	Treasure of the Onyx Dragon	Alison Gilligan	1990
106	Hijacked!	Richard Brightfield	1990
107	Fight for Freedom	Jay Leibold	1990
108	Master of Karate	Richard Brightfield	1990
109	Chinese Dragons	R. A. Montgomery	1991
110	Invaders from Within	Edward Packard	1991
111	Smoke Jumper	R. A. Montgomery	1991
112	Skateboard Champion	Edward Packard	1991
113	The Lost Ninja	Jay Leibold	1991
114	Daredevil Park	Sara & Spencer Compton	1991
115	The Island of Time	R. A. Montgomery	1991
116	Kidnapped!	Edward Packard	1991
117	The Search for Aladdin's Lamp	Jay Leibold	1991
118	Vampire Invaders	Edward Packard	1991
119	The Terrorist Trap	Shannon Gilligan	1991
120	Ghost Train	Louise Munro Foley	1991
121	Behind the Wheel	R. A. Montgomery	1992
122	Magic Master	Edward Packard	1992
123	Silver Wings	R. A. Montgomery	1992
124	Superbike	Edward Packard	1992
125	Outlaw Gulch	Ramsey Montgomery	1992
126	Master of Martial Arts	Richard Brightfield	1992
127	Showdown	Shannon Gilligan	1992
128	Viking Raiders	Edward Packard	1992
129	Earthquake!	Alison Gilligan	1992
130	You Are Microscopic	Edward Packard	1992
131	Surf Monkeys	Jay Leibold	1993
132	The Luckiest Day of Your Life	Edward Packard	1993
133	The Forgotten Planet	Doug Wilhelm	1993
134	Secret of the Dolphins	Edward Packard	1993
135	Playoff Champion	Felix von Moschzisker	1993
136	Roller Star	Edward Packard	1993
137	Scene of the Crime	Doug Wilhelm	1993
138	Dinosaur Island	Edward Packard	1993
139	Motocross Mania	R. A. Montgomery	1993
140	Horror House	Edward Packard	1993
141	The Secret of Mystery Hill	Doug Wilhelm	1993
142	The Reality Machine	Edward Packard	1993
143	Project UFO	R. A. Montgomery	1994
144	Comet Crash	Edward Packard	1994
145	Everest Adventure	A. C. Montgomery	1994
146	Soccer Star	Edward Packard	1994
147	The Antimatter Universe	Kate Mueller	1994
148	Master of Judo	Richard Brightfield	1994
149	Search the Amazon!	Doug Wilhelm	1994
150	Who Are You?	Edward Packard	1994
151	Gunfire at Gettysburg	Doug Wilhelm	1994
152	War with the Mutant Spider Ants	Edward Packard	1994
153	Last Run	R. A. Montgomery	1994
154	Cyberspace Warrior	Edward Packard	1994
155	Ninja Cyborg	Jay Leibold	1995
156	You Are an Alien	Edward Packard	1995
157	U.N. Adventure	Ramsey Montgomery	1995
158	Sky-Jam!	Edward Packard	1995
159	Tattoo of Death	R. A. Montgomery	1995
160	The Computer Takeover	Edward Packard	1995
161	Possessed!	R. A. Montgomery	1995
162	Typhoon!	Edward Packard	1995
163	Shadow of the Swastika	Doug Wilhelm	1995
164	Fright Night	Edward Packard	1995
165	Snowboard Racer	Anson Montgomery	1995
166	Master of Aikido	Richard Brightfield	1995
167	Moon Quest	Anson Montgomery	1996
168	Hostage!	Edward Packard	1996
169	Terror on the Titanic	Jim Wallace	1996
170	Greed, Guns, and Gold	Edward Packard	1996
171	Death in the Dorm	R. A. Montgomery	1996
172	Mountain Biker	Edward Packard	1996
173	The Gold Medal Secret	Doug Wilhelm	1996
174	The Power Dome	Edward Packard	1996
175	The Underground Railroad	Doug Wilhelm	1996
176	Master of Kendo	Richard Brightfield	1997
177	Killer Virus	R. A. Montgomery	1997
178	River of No Return	Vince Lahey	1997
179	Ninja Avenger	Jay Leibold	1997
180	Stampede!	Laban Carrick Hill	1997
181	Fire On Ice	Edward Packard	1998
182	Fugitive	Edward Packard	1998
183	CyberHacker	Anson Montgomery	1998
184	Mayday!	Edward and Andrea Packard	1998

Bantam Books republished a small number of these books with different titles:

#	Title	Republished Title
3	By Balloon to the Sahara	Danger in the Desert
5	The Mystery of Chimney Rock	The Curse of the Haunted Mansion
6	Your Code Name Is Jonah	Spy Trap
7	The Third Planet from Altair	Message from Space
10	The Lost Jewels of Nabooti	The Lost Jewels

=== Choose Your Own Adventure for Younger Readers (Bantam-Skylark) ===
These books are written for a simpler reading level than the main series and have less severe "bad endings".

#	Title	Author	Year
1	The Circus	Edward Packard	1981
2	The Haunted House	R. A. Montgomery	1981
3	Sunken Treasure	Edward Packard	1982
4	Your Very Own Robot	R. A. Montgomery	1982
5	Gorga, the Space Monster	Edward Packard	1982
6	The Green Slime	Susan Saunders	1982
7	Help! You're Shrinking	Edward Packard	1983
8	Indian Trail	R. A. Montgomery	1983
9	Dream Trips	Edward Packard	1983
10	The Genie in the Bottle	Jim Razzi	1983
11	The Bigfoot Mystery	Lynn Sonberg	1983
12	The Creature from Miller's Pond	Susan Saunders	1983
13	Jungle Safari	Edward Packard	1983
14	The Search for Champ)	Shannon Gilligan	1983
15	The Three Wishes	Shannon Gilligan	1984
16	Dragons!	Jim Razzi	1984
17	Wild Horse Country	Lynn Sonberg	1984
18	Summer Camp	Judy Gitenstein	1984
19	The Tower of London	Susan Saunders	1984
20	Trouble in Space	John Woodcock	1984
21	Mona is Missing	Shannon Gilligan	1984
22	The Evil Wizard	Andrea Packard	1984
23	The Polar Bear Express	Edward Packard	1984
24	The Mummy's Tomb	Stephanie Spinner	1985
25	The Flying Carpet	Jim Razzi	1985
26	The Magic Path	Julius Goodman	1985
27	Ice Cave	Susan Saunders	1985
28	Fire!	R. A. Montgomery	1985
29	The Fairy Kidnap	Shannon Gilligan	1985
30	Runaway Spaceship	Susan Saunders	1985
31	Lost Dog!	R. A. Montgomery	1985
32	Blizzard at Black Swan Inn	Susan Saunders	1986
33	Haunted Harbor	Shannon Gilligan	1986
34	Attack of the Monster Plants	Susan Saunders	1986
35	The Miss Liberty Caper	Susan Saunders	1986
36	The Owl Tree	R. A. Montgomery	1986
37	Haunted Halloween Party	Susan Saunders	1986
38	Sand Castle	R. A. Montgomery	1986
39	Caravan	R. A. Montgomery	1987
40	The Great Easter Bunny Adventure	Edward Packard	1987
41	The Movie Mystery	Susan Saunders	1987
42	Light on Burro Mountain	Susan Saunders	1987
43	Home in Time for Christmas	R. A. Montgomery	1987
44	You See the Future	Deborah Lerme Goodman	1988
45	The Great Zopper Toothpaste Treasure	Jennifer Bach and Amy Brost	1988
46	A Day with the Dinosaurs	Edward Packard	1988
47	Spooky Thanksgiving	R. A. Montgomery	1988
48	You Are Invisible	Susan Saunders	1989
49	Race of the Year	R. A. Montgomery	1989
50	Stranded!	Sara Compton	1989
51	You Can Make a Difference: The Story of Martin Luther King, Jr.	Anne Bailey	1990
52	The Enchanted Attic	Adele Read	1992

=== Choose Your Own Adventure: Walt Disney Series ===
These books involve the worlds of the many different Disney films and featurettes.

#	Title	Author	Year
1	Snow White in the Enchanted Forest	Jim Razzi	1985
2	Pinocchio's Adventures	Jim Razzi	1985
3	Dumbo's Circus	Jim Razzi	1985
4	Cinderella's Magic Adventure	Jim Razzi	1985
5	Alice's Wonderland Adventure	Jim Razzi	1985
6	Sleeping Beauty and the Prince	Jim Razzi	1985
7	Peter Pan in Never Land	Jim Razzi	1986
8	Jungle Book Adventure	Jim Razzi	1986
9	Mickey's Christmas Carol Adventure	Jim Razzi	1986
10	Wind in the Willows Adventure	Jim Razzi	1986
11	Bambi's Woodland Adventure	Jim Razzi	1987
12	Winnie-the-Pooh and His Friends	Jim Razzi	1987

=== Choose Your Own Super Adventure ===
These books are longer and more complex than the books in the regular series.

#	Title	Author	Year
1	Journey to the Year 3000	Edward Packard	1987
2	Danger Zones	R. A. Montgomery	1987

=== Choose Your Own Adventure: Passport ===
This series is more educational and casts the reader as a member of a globe-trotting news team.

#	Title	Author	Year
1	Tour de France	James Becket	1992
2	Forgotten Days	Kate Mueller	1992
3	On Tour	Ken McMurtry	1992
4	Path of the Crusaders	Ken McMurtry	1992
5	Mystery on the Trans-Siberian Express	Ken McMurtry	1992
6	Manhunt	Ken McMurtry	1992

=== Choose Your Own Nightmare ===
The success of R.L. Stine's Goosebumps horror novels inspired a flood of children's horror books, including this Choose Your Own Adventure spin-off series. The same year, Goosebumps began the Give Yourself Goosebumps series under a similar concept. Some of the following titles have been made into computer games/movies by Multipath Movies

#	Title	Author	Year	Adapted into game/movie
1	Night of the Werewolf	Edward Packard	1995	Yes
2	Beware the Snake's Venom	Ken McMurtry	1995	No
3	Island of Doom	Richard Brightfield	1995	No
4	Castle of Darkness	R. A. Montgomery	1995	No
5	The Halloween Party	E. A. M. Jakab	1995	Yes
6	Risk Your Life Arcade	Ken McMurtry	1995	No
7	Biting for Blood	Edward Packard	1996	No
8	Bugged Out!	Laban Carrick Hill	1996	No
9	The Mummy Who Wouldn't Die	E. A. M. Jakab	1996	Yes
10	It Happened at Camp Pine Tree	R. A. Montgomery and Janet Hubbard-Brown	1996	No
11	Watch Out for Room 13	Laban Carrick Hill	1996	No
12	Something's in the Woods	Richard Brightfield	1996	No
13	The Haunted Baby	Edward Packard	1997	No
14	The Evil Pen Pal	Laban Carrick Hill	1997	Yes
15	How I Became a Freak	Richard Brightfield	1997	Yes
16	Welcome to Horror Hospital	Laban Carrick Hill	1997	No
17	Attack of the Living Mask	Robert Hirshfield	1997	No
18	The Toy Shop of Terror	Laban Carrick Hill	1997	No

=== Choose Your Own Adventure, The Young Indiana Jones Chronicles ===
These books were based on The Young Indiana Jones Chronicles television show.

1. The Valley of the Kings by Richard Brightfield, 1992
2. South of the Border by Richard Brightfield, 1992
3. Revolution in Russia by Richard Brightfield, 1992
4. Masters of the Louvre by Richard Brightfield, 1992
5. African Safari by Richard Brightfield, 1993
6. Behind the Great Wall by Richard Brightfield, 1993
7. The Roaring Twenties by Richard Brightfield, 1993
8. The Irish Rebellion by Richard Brightfield, 1993

=== Choose Your Own Star Wars Adventure ===
These books were based on the original Star Wars Trilogy.

1. A New Hope by Christopher Golden, 1998
2. The Empire Strikes Back by Christopher Golden, 1998
3. Return of the Jedi by Christopher Golden, 1998

=== Your First Adventure ===
These books were published between 1984 and 1987 and were aimed at very young readers. Each book contains one central choice for the reader to make.

1. Little Owl Leaves the Nest by Marcia Leonard
2. Little Pig’s Birthday by Marcia Leonard
3. Little Rabbit’s Baby Sister by Marcia Leonard
4. Little Duck Finds a Friend by Marcia Leonard
5. Little Mouse Makes a Mess by Marcia Leonard
6. Little Panda Gets Lost by Marcia Leonard
7. Little Kangaroo’s Bad Day by Marcia Leonard
8. Little Raccoon Goes to the Beach by Marcia Leonard
9. Little Kitten Sleeps Over by Marcia Leonard
10. Little Puppy’s Rainy Day by Marcia Leonard
11. Little Fox's Best Friend by Marcia Leonard
12. Little Goat’s Big Big Brother by Marcia Leonard

=== Choose Your Own Adventure – Space Hawks ===
1. Faster than Light by Edward Packard
2. Alien Invaders by Edward Packard
3. Space Fortress by Edward Packard
4. The Comet Masters by Edward Packard
5. The Fiber People by Edward Packard
6. The Planet Eater by Edward Packard

== Books published by Chooseco (2005–present) ==
In 2005, Chooseco began republishing selected titles from the Choose Your Own Adventure family of books.

=== Choose Your Own Adventure ===
These are the original books, updated with revised text and new artwork, as well as brand-new titles.

1. The Abominable Snowman by R. A. Montgomery (2005)
2. Journey Under The Sea by R. A. Montgomery (2005)
3. Space And Beyond by R. A. Montgomery (2005)
4. The Lost Jewels of Nabooti by R. A. Montgomery (2005)
5. Mystery of the Maya by R. A. Montgomery (2005)
6. House of Danger by R. A. Montgomery (2005)
7. Race Forever by R. A. Montgomery (2005)
8. Escape by R. A. Montgomery (2005)
9. Lost on the Amazon by R. A. Montgomery (2005)
10. Prisoner of the Ant People by R. A. Montgomery (2005)
11. Trouble on Planet Earth by R. A. Montgomery (2005)
12. War with the Evil Power Master by R. A. Montgomery (2005)
13. Cup Of Death/The Mystery of Ura Senke by Shannon Gilligan (2005)
14. The Case of the Silk King by Shannon Gilligan (2005)
15. Beyond Escape! by R. A. Montgomery (2005)
16. Secret of the Ninja by Jay Leibold (2005)
17. The Brilliant Dr. Wogan by R. A. Montgomery (2005)
18. Return to Atlantis by R. A. Montgomery (2005)
19. Forecast From Stonehenge by R. A. Montgomery (2007)
20. Inca Gold by Jim Becket (2007)
21. Struggle Down Under/Terror in Australia by Shannon Gilligan (2007)
22. Tattoo of Death by R. A. Montgomery (2007)
23. Silver Wings by R. A. Montgomery (2007)
24. Terror on the Titanic by Jim Wallace (2007)
25. Search for the Mountain Gorillas by Jim Wallace (2008)
26. Moon Quest by Anson Montgomery (2008)
27. Project UFO by R. A. Montgomery (2008)
28. Island of Time by R. A. Montgomery (2008)
29. Smoke Jumpers by R. A. Montgomery (2009)
30. Chinese Dragons by R. A. Montgomery (2009)
31. Track Star! by R. A. Montgomery (2009)
32. U.N. Adventure: Mission To Molowa by Ramsey Montgomery (2009)
33. Blood on the Handle by R. A. Montgomery (2010)
34. Zombie Penpal by Ken McMurtry (2010)
35. Behind the Wheel by R. A. Montgomery (2010)
36. Punishment: Earth by R. A. Montgomery (2010)
37. Pirate Treasure of the Onyx Dragon by Alison Gilligan (2011)
38. Search For The Black Rhino by Alison Gilligan (2011)
39. The Curse Of The Pirate Mist by Doug Wilhelm (2011)
40. The Trail Of Lost Time by R. A. Montgomery (2011)

Published as an additional entry to the original series:

185. Escape from the Haunted Warehouse by Anson Montgomery (2015)

Additional unnumbered books:

- By Balloon to the Sahara by D. Terman (2015)
- The Magic of the Unicorn by Deborah Lerme Goodman (2017)
- Surf Monkeys by Jay Leibold (2017)
- The Throne of Zeus by Deborah Lerme Goodman (2018)
- The Trumpet of Terror by Deborah Lerme Goodman (2018)
- Return of the Ninja by Jay Leibold (2019)
- The Lost Ninja by Jay Leibold (2019)
- The Rescue of the Unicorn by Deborah Lerme Goodman (2021)
- The Flight of the Unicorn by Deborah Lerme Goodman (2022)
- Antarctica! by Lily Simonson (2022)
- Brooklyn Mermaid by C. E. Simpson (2022)
- The Warlock and the Unicorn by Deborah Lerme Goodman (2023)
- Sister from the Multiverse by C. E. Berger (2023)
- Escape of the Unicorn by Deborah Lerme Goodman (2024)

=== Choose Your Own Adventure: New Classics ===
The books in this series are unnumbered oversized paperbacks, featuring new titles not previously published.

- Time Travel Inn by Bart King (2021)
- Murder at the Old Willow Boarding School by Jessika Fleck (2023)
- Time Travel Inn 2 by Bart King (2023)
- The Curse of Great Winter Academy by Jessika Fleck (2025)
- Cryptid Chronicles: Mothman by Cristin Bishara (2025)
- At the Mountains of Madness by Jacopo della Quercia (2025)
- The Stowaway by Griffin McElroy (2026)
- Dungeon Crawl at the Haunted Mall by Jendia Gammon (2026)
- Cryptid Chronicles: Chupacabra by Cristin Bishara (2026)
- Snare Your Crush (in Three Easy Steps) by Emma Carlson Berne (2026)
- Quantum Creep by E.C. Myers (2027)
- Freya the Dragon Rider by Amy Ratcliffe (2027)

=== Choose Your Own Adventure: Graphic Novels ===
The books in this series are graphic novel adaptations of previously published Choose Your Own Adventure books, featuring new artwork.

- Eighth Grade Witch by C.E. Simpson, adapted by Andrew Gaska & E.L. Thomas, art by Valerie Chiola (2021)
- Journey Under the Sea by R.A. Montgomery, adapted by Andrew Gaska & E.L. Thomas, art by Dani Bolinho (2022)
- Forecast from Stonehenge by R.A. Montgomery, adapted by Stephanie Phillips, art by Dani Bolinho (2024)
- Space and Beyond by R.A. Montgomery, adapted by Jeremy Lambert, art by Dani Bolinho (2026)

=== Choose Your Own Adventure: The Golden Path ===
The books in this series are set on a dangerous future Earth where the government cannot be trusted and powerful mystical forces are at work. The series forms a continuing storyline, and each book can lead the reader to different starting points in the following volume depending on which ending is reached.

1. Into the Hollow Earth by Anson Montgomery (2008)
2. Burned by the Inner Sun by Anson Montgomery (2008)
3. Paying the Ferryman by Anson Montgomery (announced but never published)

=== Dragonlarks ===
These are republications of Choose Your Own Adventure for Younger Readers books, with revised text, new coloured art and a larger format.

1. Caravan by R. A. Montgomery (2006)
2. Indian Trail by R. A. Montgomery (2006)
3. Your Very Own Robot by R. A. Montgomery (2006)
4. The Haunted House by R. A. Montgomery (2006)
5. The Lake Monster Mystery by Shannon Gilligan (2008) (revision of The Search for Champ)
6. Always Picked Last by R. A. Montgomery
7. Your Purrr-fect Birthday by R. A. Montgomery
8. Ghost Island by Shannon Gilligan (revision of Haunted Harbor)
9. Princess Island by Shannon Gilligan

Sorted by grade level: Kindergarten:

1. The Haunted House by R. A. Montgomery
2. Monsters Of The Deep by R. A. Montgomery
3. Lost Dog! by R. A. Montgomery

Grade 1:

1. Your Very Own Robot by R. A. Montgomery
2. Indian Trail by R. A. Montgomery
3. Your Purrr-fect Birthday by R. A. Montgomery
4. Sand Castle by R. A. Montgomery
5. The Lake Monster Mystery by Shannon Gilligan
6. Owl Tree by R. A. Montgomery
7. Return To The Haunted House by R. A. Montgomery

=== Choose Your Own Adventure Nightmare ===
1. Eighth Grade Witch by C. E. Simpson (2014)
2. Blood Island by Liz Windover (2014)
3. Snake Invasion by Doug Wilhelm (2016)

=== Choose Your Own Adventure: Spies ===
1. James Armistead Lafayette by Kyandreia Jones (2019)
2. Mata Hari by Katherine Factor (2019)
3. Harry Houdini by Katherine Factor (2020)
4. Noor Inayat Khan by Rana Tahir (2020)
5. Mary Bowser by Kyandreia Jones (2020)
6. Spy for Cleopatra by Katherine Factor (2021)
7. Josephine Baker by Deborah Lerme Goodman (2025)

=== Choose Your Own Adventure: Mathmatics ===
- The Dregg Disaster - An Algebra I Workbook by Chris Matthews (2022)

=== Choose Your Own Adventure: Random House licensed properties ===
- Stranger Things: Heroes and Monsters by Rana Tahir (2023)
- Among Us: Welcome Aboard by Jasmine Walls (2026)
- Teenage Mutant Ninja Turtles: The Mutants take Manhattan by Bart King (2027)

=== Choose Your Own Adventure: The Citadel of Whispers ===
- The Citadel of Whispers by Kazim Ali (2021)

== Books published by McGraw-Hill Education (2011–present) ==
This series is published by McGraw-Hill Education under license from Chooseco. It adapts 30 of the Chooseco reissues, aiming them primarily at ESL learners. A graded reader series uses simplified language, suitable for struggling readers and for those learning English as a second language. See also Extensive reading.

=== Choose Your Own Adventure Graded Readers ===
#	Title	Author	Adapted by	Year
1	Search for the Yeti (prev. The Abominable Snowman)	R. A. Montgomery	Marcos Benevides	2011
2	Mystery of the Maya	R. A. Montgomery	Marcos Benevides	2011
3	Secret of the Ninja	Jay Leibold	Chris Valvona	2012
4	The Destiny Device (prev. The Brilliant Dr. Wogan)	R. A. Montgomery	Marcos Benevides	2012
5	Inca Gold	Jim Becket	Chris Valvona	2012
6	Race Forever	R. A. Montgomery	Marcos Benevides	2013
7	Escape from Dorado (prev. Escape!)	R. A. Montgomery	Ted O'Neill	2013
8	Cup of Death	Shannon Gilligan	Mark Firth	2013
9	The Lost City of the Outback (prev. Struggle Down Under)	Shannon Gilligan	Chris Valvona	2013
10	School of the Living Dead (prev. Zombie Penpal)	Ken McMurtry	Marcos Benevides	2013
11	Lost on the Amazon	R. A. Montgomery	Mark Firth	2013
12	Track Star	R. A. Montgomery	Chris Valvona	2013
13	The Secret of Stonehenge (prev. Forecast from Stonehenge)	R. A. Montgomery	Marcos Benevides	2013
14	House of Danger	R. A. Montgomery	Marcos Benevides	2013
15	Murder in the Family (prev. Blood on the Handle)	R. A. Montgomery	Mark Firth	2013
16	Silver Wings	R. A. Montgomery	Chris Valvona	2013
17	Journey to Atlantis (prev. Journey Under the Sea)	R. A. Montgomery	Chris Valvona	2013
18	Task Force: U.N. (prev. U.N. Adventure: Mission to Molowa)	Ramsey Montgomery	Marcos Benevides	2013
19	The Jewels of Nabooti (prev. The Lost Jewels of Nabooti)	R. A. Montgomery	Mark Firth	2013
20	Return to Dorado (prev. Beyond Escape!)	R. A. Montgomery	Ted O'Neill	2013
21	Terror on the Titanic	Jim Wallace	Mark Firth	2013
22	Treasure of the Onyx Dragon	Alison Gilligan	Marcos Benevides	2013
23	Tattoo of Death	R. A. Montgomery	Chris Valvona	2013
24	Moon Quest	Anson Montgomery	Ted O'Neill	2013
25	Exiled to Earth (reissued as Punishment: Earth)	R. A. Montgomery	Marcos Benevides	2013
26	Smoke Jumpers	R. A. Montgomery	Ted O'Neill	2013
27	The Case of the Silk King	Shannon Gilligan	Mark Firth	2013
28	Project UFO	R. A. Montgomery	Marcos Benevides	2013
29	Chinese Dragons	R. A. Montgomery	Mark Firth	2013
30	The Gorillas of Uganda (prev. Search for the Mountain Gorillas)	Jim Wallace	Marcos Benevides	2013
