= Louise Munro Foley =

Canadian writer (1933-2021)

Louise Munro Foley (October 22, 1933 – February 19, 2021) was a Canadian writer who later moved to the United States. She was born as Louise Munro in Toronto; her last name was adopted in 1957 when she married Donald Foley.

In the 1960s she worked as a copy editor for a number of radio stations and department stores before taking courses at California State University in Sacramento. Whilst doing this, she wrote her first book, "The Caper Club" and it was published in 1969. Foley also wrote a number of articles for Writer's Digest and the Christian Science Monitor during this period, besides hosting a number of radio programmes. After she finished her degree at California State University in 1976, Foley divorced and turned to full-time writing, firstly for the Twistaplot series and from 1983, for Choose Your Own Adventure.

Foley was only the fourth author after Edward Packard, R.A. Montgomery and Richard Brightfield to establish herself permanently within the Choose Your Own Adventure series.

Her last book for Choose Your Own Adventure, Ghost Train was written in 1991. After that time, Foley moved to young-adult fiction, writing a number of books about intelligent cats.

Foley was later an instructor at the Institute of Children's Literature in West Redding, Connecticut. She died on February 19, 2021, at the age of 87.

== Bibliography ==
- Fight Club (1969)
- A toddler for Jeffery (1970)
- Sammy's Sister (1970)
- Somebody Stole Second (1972)
- No Talking (1974)
- Tackle 22 (1978)
- The Train of Terror (1982)
- The Sinister Studios of KESP-TV (1983)
- Australia: Find the Flying Foxes (1988)
- "Blood!" Said the Cat (1992)
- "Poison!" Said the Cat (1992)
- "Thief!" Said the Cat (1992)
- The Bird-Brained Fiasco (1996)
- My Substitute Teacher's Gone Batty (1996)
- The Phoney-Baloney Professor (1996)

=== Choose Your Own Adventure Books ===
- #23 The Lost Tribe (August 1983)
- #34 The Mystery of the Highland Crest (July 1984)
- #42 The Mystery of Echo Lodge (March 1985)
- #49 Danger at Anchor Mine (October 1985)
- #54 Forest of Fear (March 1986)
- #65 The Mardi Gras Mystery (February 1987)
- #79 Mystery of the Sacred Stones (May 1988)
- #104 The Cobra Connection (August 1990)
- #120 Ghost Train (December 1991)
