= Shadow Warriors: Inside the Special Forces =

2002 non-fiction book written by Tom Clancy

- First edition
- Author: Tom Clancy
- Language: English
- Genre: Non-fiction
- Publisher: Putnam's Sons
- Publication date: February 2002
- Publication place: United States
- ISBN: 978-0-425-18831-6

Shadow Warriors: Inside the Special Forces is a non-fiction book written by Tom Clancy with help from General Carl Stiner (Ret.) and Tony Koltz. First Published by Putnam's Sons in February 2002. ISBN 978-0-425-18831-6. The book reached number one on The New York Times Best Seller list.

This is an account of the transformation of the United States Special Forces from a small core of outsiders in the 1950s, through the fires of the Vietnam War, to the rebirth of the Special Forces in the late 1980s and 1990s. There is a chapter devoted to Office of Strategic Services operations in occupied France during WW2. Much of the book focuses on bureaucratic battles during the formation of the United States Special Operations Command after the failure of Operation Eagle Claw.

It gives firsthand accounts of elite members of the Army Special Forces, Navy SEALs, U.S. Army Rangers, Air Force Special Operations, PsyOps, Civil Affairs, and other special-mission units performing missions such as counterterrorism, raids, hostage rescues, reconnaissance, counterinsurgency, and psychological operations.
