= Children of Magic Moon =

1990 novel by Wolfgang and Heike Hohlbein

- First edition
- Author: Wolfgang Hohlbein, Heike Hohlbein
- Original title: 'Märchenmonds Kinder'
- Language: German
- Series: Magic Moon
- Genre: Fantasy novel
- Publisher: Ueberreuter
- Publication date: 1990
- Publication place: Germany
- English publication date: 2007 (Tokyopop)
- Media type: Print (Hardback & Paperback)
- ISBN: 1-59816-453-8
- OCLC: 192027797
- Preceded by: Magic Moon
- Followed by: Heirs of Magic Moon

Children of Magic Moon (original title: Märchenmonds Kinder) is a young adult fantasy novel written by German authors Wolfgang and Heike Hohlbein in 1990. It is a sequel to 1982's Magic Moon and the second of four books in the series. It was released in the United States in October 2007.

== Plot introduction ==
The wizard Themistocles appears to Kim and urges him to return to Magic Moon, the land that people travel to when they dream. When the young boy arrives, he finds the magic realm dramatically changed.

== Plot summary ==
Two years have passed since Kim's first voyage to the magical dream realm of Magic Moon, but then his old friend and advisor, the wizard Themistocles, appears to him in everyday situations, making him realize that something is wrong and that he must return to Magic Moon. After some trouble trying, Kim succeeds, only to find the dream realm very different from how it used to be: machines and greed have found their way into the simple life of the inhabitants, and an overall bitterness even affects his old friends Rangarig and Gorg.

Kim discovers an even more terrifying secret: the children of Magic Moon are mysteriously disappearing; some of them even appear, oblivious to anything around them, in Kim's world! Apparently, the dwarves, who have mysteriously appeared along with the machines, seem to be behind this, but the secret goes much deeper than that.

== Sequels ==
The story of Kim's adventures in Magic Moon culminates in a third novel, Märchenmonds Erben ("Heirs of Magic Moon") in 1998.

The newest installment, Die Zauberin von Märchenmond ("The Sorceress Of Magic Moon"), released in Germany in 2006, features a girl called Rebekka as the new protagonist. She is, however, not Kim's sister, although it is strongly hinted that she is the daughter of Kim, as it is told that her father used to tell her stories about Magic Moon.

== Continuity mistakes ==
- In the prequel Magic Moon, the people called Steppe Riders ("Steppenreiter" in German) disdain the use of weapons and armor (except shields), and are culturally consummate masters of unarmed combat. In this novel, however, Kim encounters a young boy from the Steppe Riders who wears a dagger; and daggers, swords, and bow and arrow are described as the "traditional weaponry" of these people.
