= Magic Moon =

1982 novel by Wolfgang Hohlbein and Heike Hohlbein

- German first edition cover, featuring the castle of Gorywynn
- Author: Wolfgang Hohlbein, Heike Hohlbein
- Original title: Märchenmond
- Language: German
- Series: Magic Moon
- Genre: Fantasy novel
- Publisher: Ueberreuter
- Publication date: 1982
- Publication place: Germany
- English publication date: 2006 (Tokyopop)
- Media type: Print (Hardback & Paperback)
- Pages: 480
- ISBN: 1-59816-452-X
- OCLC: 65341127
- Dewey Decimal: 833/.92 22
- LC Class: PT2668.O3795 M3713 2006
- Followed by: Children of Magic Moon

Magic Moon (original title: Märchenmond, meaning "Fairy Tale Moon") is a young adult fantasy novel written by German authors Wolfgang and Heike Hohlbein in 1982.

The book was Hohlbein's first success as a writer and the starting point of his career as one of Europe's most well-known and prolific fantasy writers. It was published in over a dozen countries and sold more than two million copies, and became the first Hohlbein novel released in the English-speaking world in 2006.

== Plot ==
Kim is an average German schoolboy who loves to delve into his favorite science fiction novel series, Star Fighter. His daydreaming life spirals into a nightmare when his parents inform him that his little sister Rebecca has fallen into a mysterious coma after her appendectomy. A visitor from the realm of Magic Moon, the wizard Themistocles, tells him there is only one way to free her from the enchantment of eternal sleep: Kim himself must travel into the land of dreams and save her from the dark wizard Boraas, who has captured her soul.

Using the power of his imagination, Kim travels to Magic Moon in a spaceship, but it crashlands on the east side of the Shadow Mountains, an unsurmountable mountain range which separates Magic Moon from Boraas' Realm of Shadows. Kim is collected by a black-armored knight named Baron Kart and brought to Castle Morgon, Boraas' abode, where the dark wizard reveals that he is holding Rebecca's soul in order to lure Kim to him and gain his allegiance in conquering Magic Moon. Desperate, Kim makes an escape, which ends in a chamber with a strange mirror. Struck by a sudden, mysterious weakness upon seeing his reflection, he barely manages to exit the castle and is temporarily sheltered by a young amphibious boy named Ado and his father, the Pond King. After recovering, Kim sets out for the Shadow Mountains to find a way to Magic Moon; but on his way he discovers that Boraas is massing a gargantuan army to cross the mountains as well.

Kim ambushes one of Boraas' warriors, and uses his horse and armor as a disguise to mingle with the enemy. Crossing a tunnel system and a magical gate underneath the mountains, he makes his way to Magic Moon, where he meets Tak, a talking badger, a giant named Gorg, and a one-eyed, one-eared giant bear named Kelhim. Joined by the latter two, Kim encounters Themistocles travelling through Magic Moon to gather allies against Boraas, and accompanies him to the last station of his journey, the realm of the Steppe Riders. In their capital fortress Caivallon, Kim and Themistocles try to persuade King Harkvan and Prince Priwinn to join forces with them, but the proud Steppe Riders decline.

Afterwards, the troupe travels to Gorywynn the Glassy, the capital of Magic Moon, where Gorg and Kelhim introduce him to Rangarig, a golden dragon. While attending a council of war, Kim learns that Boraas has gained a mysterious ally named the Dark Lord, whose appearance predicts the certain destruction of Magic Moon. Kim is possessed by a spiritual oracle who tells the assembled that Kim is to seek help from the King of Rainbows, who rules a celestial realm beyond the physical borders of Magic Moon. Kim is determined to seek out the King of Rainbows, but Themistocles refuses. Shortly after, Priwinn and a number of Steppe Riders arrive as refugees in Gorywynn and relate how Boraas' army has razed Caivallon to the ground and killed Harkvan. Now fully determined to stop Boraas and save Magic Moon, Kim sneaks out of Gorywynn to find the King of Rainbows, joined by Gorg, Kelhim, Rangarig and Priwinn.

The companions proceed to their first station, the Gorge of Souls, the remnant of a horrible war predating Magic Moon's existence, to follow the course of the Vanished River to Castle Worldend, the gate to the Rainbow King's realm. As they travel, they end up saving a farmer named Brobing and his family from a raiding party and find themselves hounded by Baron Kart and a massive contingent of Boraas' army. Descending into the Gorge to find the way, they have to content with a gigantic tatzelwurm, and Rangarig sacrifices himself to help his friends get past the beast. The companions are later joined by Ado after he and his father thwart an attack by Baron Kart at the cost of the Pond King's life, and Gorg later stays behind to delay Kart once more. Later, in the Icy Wasteland surrounding Castle Worldend, Kart and the remnants of his army catch up with them, but the attack is stalled by a group of ice giants living in Worldend. Kim and his friends are given shelter, but the ice giants declare that beyond opening the way to the Rainbow King, they must remain neutral in Magic Moon's conflict. Thus, at the edge of all reality, Kim must fight a final duel with Baron Kart, which ends in Kart's death as he accidentally impales himself on Kim's sword.

As the fight is ended, a bridge into the nothingness and a roc bring Kim to the Rainbow King, who agrees to help Magic Moon. As they return to Gorywynn, they find the castle already under heavy siege. As the Rainbow King uses his magic to neutralize Boraas' forces, Boraas makes himself known and explains that it was his plan to lure the King of Rainbows to him so he could destroy him too. Overwhelmed by Boraas' darkness, the Rainbow King falls, and Boraas' army storms Gorywynn. Retreating to the castle's throne room, Kim and Themistocles face Boraas and the Dark Lord. After refusing Boraas' offer to join him, Themistocles duels the Dark Lord, who is revealed to be an evil doppelgänger of Kim created by Boraas' baleful mirror, as Boraas, his army and the Shadow Realm themselves are reflections of Magic Moon and its inhabitants.

In his lust for total victory, Boraas kills Kim and Themistocles, but this creates a paradox which undoes his dark magic, causing Boraas, the Dark Lord and the Realm of Shadows to cease to exist after their originals are destroyed. Thus, Magic Moon and the lost companions are completely restored, and Kim and Rebecca are happily reunited. After a long sojourn in Magic Moon, they return to Earth, where Rebecca finally awakes from her coma.

== Sequels ==
The story of the adventures of Kim Moon Magic continued on a second novel, Märchenmonds Kinder ("Children of Magic Moon") in 1990 and a third, Märchenmonds Erben ("Magic Moon's Heirs") in 1998.

A new section, Die Zauberin von Märchenmond ("The Sorceress of Magic Moon"), published in Germany in 2005, features Rebekka, Kim's sister, as the new protagonist. Kim himself does not appear, as he is explained to be attending college at the time of the plot.

The newest release, Silberhorn ("Silver Horn"), was published in Germany in 2009.
