= Twistaplot =

Children's Gamebook

The cover for the first book in the series, written by R. L. Stine.

Twistaplot is a series of children's gamebooks published by Scholastic from 1982 to 1985. Books #1, #4, #9, and #14 were written by R.L. Stine, who went on to write the Fear Street series and the Goosebumps series, which in turn spawned the gamebook spin-off series Give Yourself Goosebumps. The remaining books were written by various authors including Louise Munro Foley. They were Scholastic's response to the Choose Your Own Adventure series. After the success of the Goosebumps series, the Twistaplot titles written by R. L. Stine were reissued with new covers in 1994 and 1995.

== Style and gameplay ==
Twistaplot covers a wide variety of genres, including science fiction, fantasy, and horror. Similar to the Give Yourself Goosebumps series, they are novels with branching plots. The books are written from the second-person perspective in present-tense form. The protagonist in each book is never referred to by name, and the protagonist's gender is usually ambiguous. Thus readers can easily imagine themselves as the protagonist of the story. Unlike the Give Yourself Goosebumps series, the books have interior illustrations.

== Spin-offs ==
After the success of Twistaplot, the series spawned a series of computer games for Scholastic's electronic magazine, Microzine. It also spawned another gamebook spin-off titled Pick-a-Path, which was intended for a younger audience.

== Books ==
=== Twistaplot ===
1. The Time Raider
2. The Train of Terror
3. The Formula for Trouble
4. Golden Sword of Dragonwalk
5. The Sinister Studios of KESP-TV
6. Crash Landing!
7. The Video Avenger
8. Race into the Past
9. Horrors of the Haunted Museum
10. Mission of the Secret Spy Squad
11. Camp-Out on Danger Mountain
12. Journey to Vernico 5
13. Midnight at Monster Mansion
14. Instant Millionaire
15. Spellcaster
16. Secrets of the Lost Island
17. Ghost Riders of Goldspur
18. Calling Outer Space

=== Pick-a-Path ===
1. The Dandee Diamond Mystery
2. The Roller Coaster Ghost
3. The Great Baseball Championship
4. The Amazing Bubblegum Caper
5. The Super Trail Bike Race
6. Mystery at Mockingbird Manor
7. The Fantastic Journey of the Space Shuttle Astra
8. The Magic Top Mystery
9. Jungle Adventure
10. The Mystery of the Missing Mummy
11. Dinosaur Adventure
12. The Ballerina Mystery
13. The Secret of 13
14. RIM, The Rebel Robot
15. The Hot Dog Gang Caper
16. Adventure at Camp Schoonover
17. Murf the Monster
