= Heike Hohlbein =

German writer (born 1954)

- Born: November 3, 1954 (age 72); Neuss, West Germany
- Occupation: Novelist
- Spouse: Wolfgang Hohlbein
- Writing career
- Genres: Fantasy, science fiction, horror, thriller, children's literature
- Website: hohlbein.net

Heike Hohlbein (born November 15, 1954, in Neuss, North Rhine-Westphalia) is a German writer of science fiction, fantasy and youth literature who lives near Neuss in North Rhine-Westphalia. She is the wife of German author Wolfgang Hohlbein. Together they are among the most successful authors in the genre of fantasy literature in Germany.

== Life ==
Heike Hohlbein was born on 3 November 1954 in Neuss, North Rhine-Westphalia. In 1971 she met Wolfgang Hohlbein, whom she married 3 years later. She raised 6 children with Hohlbein together. In 1977 their daughter Rebecca Hohlbein was born, who became a writer herself too.

In 2014 the German TV channel RTL II launched a reality show called Die Hohlbeins – Eine total fantastische Familie (The Hohlbein's, a fantastic family), which aimed to show the life of the Hohlbein family in the a docusoap format. The show garnered about 910.000 viewers during the first episode, but after a fast drop-off in viewers and negative criticism of being too trivial and boring it was cancelled soon after.

== Work ==
Heike Hohlbein is credited as co-author in many of Wolfgang Hohlbein's books. She acts primary provider of ideas and inspiration for him, especially in the fantasy genre. Together they are the most successful fantasy authors in Germany. They published more than 200 books and sold more than 43 million copies of them. Being one of the most successful fantasy writers in Germany, their works have been translated in multiple languages from across the globe. The only exception is the English language, into which only their most successful work Märchenmond (English title: Magic Moon) has been translated.

== Bibliography ==
(as co-author)

=== Stand-alone novels ===
- Laurin. Ueberreuter, 2016, ISBN 3-76417058-1
- Die Schneekönigin. arsEdition, 2015, ISBN 3-84581202-8
- Silberhorn. Ueberreuter, 2009, ISBN 3-8000-5448-5
- Das Buch. Ueberreuter, August 2003, ISBN 3-8000-2997-9
- Der Greif. Ueberreuter, 1989, ISBN 3-8000-2052-1
- Die Bedrohung. Heyne, 1994, ISBN 3-453-72061-X
- Die Heldenmutter. Lübbe, 1985, ISBN 3-404-25267-5
- Die Prophezeiung. Ueberreuter, 1993, ISBN 3-8000-5043-9
- Drachenfeuer. Ueberreuter, 1988, ISBN 3-8000-2295-8
- Dreizehn. Arena, 1995, ISBN 3-401-02897-9
- Elfentanz. Carlsen, 1984, ISBN 3-551-36178-9
- Katzenwinter. Ueberreuter, 1997, ISBN 3-8000-5069-2
- Kein Platz mehr im Hundehimmel. Ueberreuter, 1986 (2004), ISBN 3-8000-5111-7
- Krieg der Engel. Ueberreuter, 1999, ISBN 3-8000-5137-0
- Midgard. Carlsen, 1987, ISBN 3-551-36373-0
- Schattenjagd. Heyne, 1996, ISBN 3-453-53005-5
- Spiegelzeit. Heyne, 1991, ISBN 3-453-18925-6
- Teufelchen. Thienemann Verlag, 1997, ISBN 3-522-17297-3
- Unterland. Ueberreuter, 1992, ISBN 3-8000-2057-2

=== Anders ===
- Die tote Stadt, Ueberreuter, 2004, ISBN 3-8000-5073-0
- Im dunklen Land, Ueberreuter, 2004, ISBN 3-8000-5087-0
- Der Thron von Tiernan, Ueberreuter, 2004, ISBN 3-8000-5088-9
- Der Gott der Elder, Ueberreuter, 2004, ISBN 3-8000-5089-7

=== Die Legende von Camelot ===
- Gralszauber, Ueberreuter, 2000, ISBN 3-8000-2661-9
- Elbenschwert, Ueberreuter, 2001, ISBN 3-8000-2678-3
- Runenschild, Ueberreuter, 2002, ISBN 3-8000-2774-7
- Die Legende von Camelot Sonderausgabe (Vol. I to III), Ueberreuter, ISBN 3-8000-5166-4

=== Drachenthal ===
- Die Entdeckung, Ueberreuter, 2002, ISBN 3-8000-2058-0
- Das Labyrinth, Ueberreuter, 2003, ISBN 3-8000-2077-7
- Die Zauberkugel, Ueberreuter, 2003, ISBN 3-8000-5032-3
- Das Spiegelkabinett, Ueberreuter, 2004, ISBN 3-8000-5042-0
- Die Rückkehr, Ueberreuter, 2007, ISBN 3-8000-5105-2

=== Märchenmond ===
- Märchenmond, Ueberreuter, 1983, ISBN 3-8000-2891-3
- Märchenmonds Kinder, Ueberreuter, 1990, ISBN 3-8000-2889-1
- Märchenmonds Erben, Ueberreuter, 1998, ISBN 3-8000-2890-5
- Das Märchen von Märchenmond, Ueberreuter, 1999, ISBN 3-8000-2607-4
- Die Zauberin von Märchenmond, Ueberreuter, 2005, ISBN 3-8000-5175-3

Volume I to III have been translated into English:

- Magic Moon, Tokyopop, 2006, ISBN 1-59816-452-X
- Children of Magic Moon, Tokyopop, 2007, ISBN 1-59816-453-8
- Legacy of Magic Moon, Tokyopop, 2008, ISBN 1-59816-454-6

=== Norg ===
- Norg im verbotenen Land, Thienemann, 2002, ISBN 3-522-17493-3
- Norg im Tal des Ungeheuers, Thienemann, 2003, ISBN 3-522-17510-7
