= Richard Brightfield =

American writer of children's gamebooks (1927–2020)

Richard Oliver Brightfield (September 28, 1927 – August 2, 2020) was an American writer of children's gamebooks.

Richard Oliver Brightfield was born in Baltimore, Maryland on September 28, 1927. He wrote a number of Choose Your Own Adventure books, and was the first author to establish himself within that series after its founders Edward Packard and R.A. Montgomery. Although he is probably best known among collectors of that series for his books on martial arts, his earliest works for that series had quite different subject matter, being focused on various scientific topics or fantasy.

Brightfield resided in Palm Beach County, Florida. He died in Boynton Beach, Florida on August 2, 2020, at the age of 92.

== See also ==
- List of Choose Your Own Adventure books
- List of gamebooks
