= Freeway Warrior =

Gamebook series created by Joe Dever

- Cover of Highway Holocaust
- Author: Joe Dever
- Illustrator: Melvyn Grant
- Country: United Kingdom
- Language: English
- Genre: Science fiction
- Published: 1988–1989
- No. of books: 4

Freeway Warrior is a series of four gamebooks, created by Joe Dever. The books were published between 1988 and 1989, detailing the complete story of a band of nuclear holocaust survivors as they flee Texas to the relative safety of California. In 2016, a Swedish company, Åskfågeln, started reprints.

The reader plays the role of Cal Phoenix, the titular Freeway Warrior, as he scouts a safe route for the rag-tag convoy of survivors on their journey to California.

== Timeline ==
- 2011: Seventeen 100-kiloton nuclear warheads are stolen by HAVOC – The Hijack, Assassination and Violent Opposition Consortium.
- New Years Day, 2012: The stolen warheads are smuggled into major cities around the globe. An ultimatum is issued: Unless a £2 trillion ransom is paid and all HAVOC agents being held prisoner released then the warheads will be detonated one by one.
- January 2, 2012: The world government refuses to cooperate; Paris, France is destroyed.
- January 3, 2012: The World Defense League retaliates by attacking HAVOC's command headquarters and killing the inhabitants. Unknown to them, a failsafe is activated and the remaining warheads are detonated. A disastrous chain reaction results, feeding on civil and military nuclear installations all across the northern hemisphere. The world as we know it ends...
- 2012–2019: Hundreds of millions of people are killed within days, and many more perish during the years that follow, falling victim to the radioactivity and the severe climatic changes that affect the earth.
- 2019–2020: Radiation decays to tolerable levels, climate returns to normal and survivors emerge to reclaim what little remains of the world they once knew.

== Prelude ==
On the eventful day, Cal Phoenix was visiting his Uncle's oil-shale mine near Austin, Texas. The mine shielded Cal from the explosions, along with his Aunt and Uncle. Unfortunately they were left trapped underground. They had sufficient supplies to survive, but it took eight long years to tunnel to the surface. When they finally broke through, the world had changed forever.

Cal, Uncle Jonas and Aunt Betty-Ann managed to make radio contact with a colony of survivors near the ruins of McKinney. This colony grew over time, becoming Dallas Colony One (DC1), one of the few safe havens in Texas.

DC1 began entering troubled times; the water supply was drying up, leaving them with no alternative but to abandon their safe haven and attempt to relocate. Rumours had been heard that California survived virtually intact, so the decision was made to head West, towards California.

== List of books ==
1. Highway Holocaust (1988)
2. Slaughter Mountain Run (1989)
3. The Omega Zone (1989)
4. California Countdown (1989)

== Game Mechanics ==
While based on the Lone Wolf system (e.g., random number tables, combat results tables, etc.) a further level of complexity is added, making for a deeper experience:

- Skill sets are introduced (including, driving, stealth, shooting) which are often tested for outcomes. These vary and can be increased from book-to-book if the complete series is played (in a similar fashion to the Kai Disciplines in Lone Wolf). One of the most important details is that the more you carry, the more your stealth reduces.
- Ranged combat is as important as close combat and a variety of different weapons, with differing characteristics are available.
- In addition to meals, water and ammo are monitored.

== Notes ==
- Highway Holocaust and Slaughter Mountain Run were initially released as Freeway Warrior 1 and Mountain Run respectively in the United States since the original titles were deemed too violent. Later releases used the official titles.
- These books were published after the Fighting Fantasy book #13, Freeway Fighter (1985) which also involved driving a modified car in a similarly post-apocalypse world. However, the FF Book was more combat oriented and less character-based, as well as featuring game statistics for the actual motor vehicle.
- The books were reprinted in the 2010s by Åskfågeln with new cover art by Lukas Thelin.
1. Highway Holocaust (2017)
2. Slaughter Mountain Run (2018)
3. The Omega Zone (2019)
4. California Countdown (2021)
