= ACE Gamebooks =

Series of gamebooks created by Jonathan Green

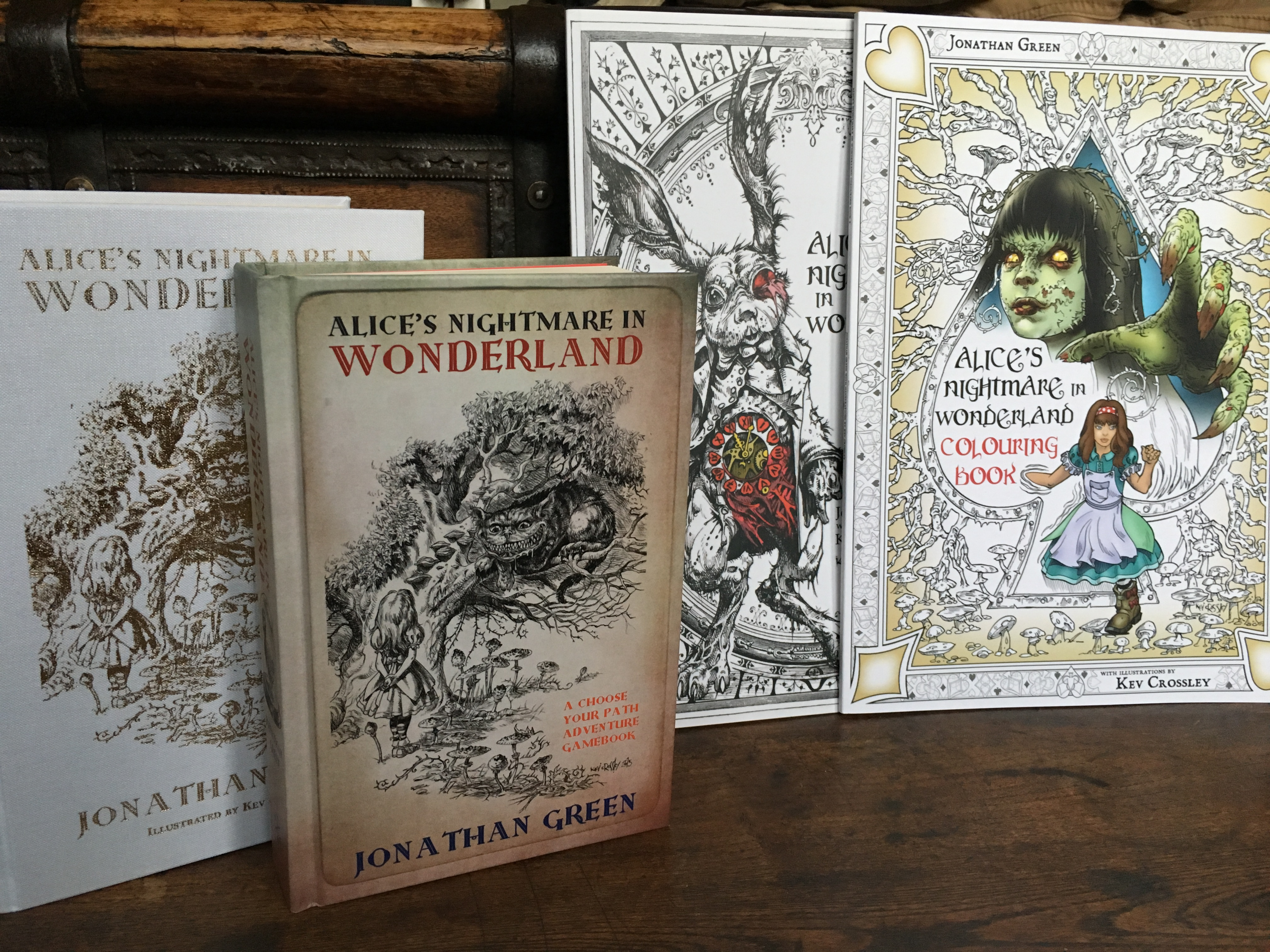
- Alice's Nightmare in Wonderland
- Alice's Nightmare in Wonderland; The Wicked Wizard of Oz; NEVERLAND - Here Be Monsters!; Beowulf Beastslayer; 'TWAS - The Krampus Night Before Christmas; 'Dracula - Curse of the Vampire; RONIN 47; Shakespeare Vs. Cthulhu: What Dreams May Come; 100 Aker Wood
- Author: Jonathan Green
- Illustrator: Kev Crossley / Russ Nicholson / Tony Hough / Hauke Kock / Neil Googe / Heraldo Mussolini
- Cover artist: Kev Crossley / Russ Nicholson / Tony Hough / Hauke Kock / Neil Googe / Heraldo Mussolini
- Country: UK
- Language: English
- Publisher: Snowbooks, ACE Gamebooks
- Published: 2015-
- Media type: print
- No. of books: 9
- Website: https://www.facebook.com/ACEgamebooks/

ACE Gamebooks is a series of gamebooks created by Jonathan Green and published by Snowbooks since 2015, and ACE Gamebooks since 2025. A feature of the titles in the series is that they take classic works of literature and give them a dark twist, often combining steampunk elements. Some of the titles take inspiration from more than one work of classic literature, such as NEVERLAND - Here Be Monsters!, which uses elements of both J. M. Barrie's Peter Pan and Wendy and Sir Arthur Conan Doyle's The Lost World.

== Gameplay ==
The ACE Gamebooks series are similar in terms of both gameplay and layout to Fighting Fantasy gamebooks, designed to be read by a single player.

The name for the series comes from the initial letters of the three attributes players keep track of throughout the books, Agility, Combat and Endurance. 'ACE' also references the fact that instead of dice, cards can be used to generate random numbers. Some books in the series introduce other attributes, such as Insanity and Logic, in Alice's Nightmare in Wonderland, and Mutiny in NEVERLAND - Here Be Monsters!

Another feature of the series is that in some of the books the reader can choose which character they want to play as. Each player character has unique content written especially for them, which includes unlockable mini-quests in books such as The Wicked Wizard of Oz.

=== Combat ===
Combat is simulated by rolling dice or picking random playing cards from a standard deck. These randomly-generated numbers are added to the player's, or an opponent's, Combat score to produce a Combat Strength. The Combat Strengths of the player and the opponent are compared, with the higher one winning the Combat Round and deducting Endurance points from the other. Combat in the books also uses an initiative system, with whoever has the initiative gaining a Combat bonus.

=== Attributes ===
- Agility: A measure of how athletic and agile you are.
- Combat: A measure of how skilled you are at fighting, be it in hand-to-hand combat, or wielding a keen-edged blade in battle.
- Endurance: A measure of how physically tough you are and how much strength you have left.

== Books in the series ==
The series consists of seven books so far, with an eighth title (Shakespeare Vs. Cthulhu: What Dreams May Come) due for release in 2024:

No.	Title	Author(s)	Cover Art	Interior Art	Sections	Published	ISBN
1	Alice's Nightmare in Wonderland	Jonathan Green	Kev Crossley	Kev Crossley	520	Nov 2015	978-1909679597
2	The Wicked Wizard of Oz	Jonathan Green	Kev Crossley	Kev Crossley	850	June 2017	978-1911390312
3	NEVERLAND - Here Be Monsters!	Jonathan Green	Kev Crossley	Kev Crossley	900	June 2019	978-1911390411
4	Beowulf Beastslayer	Jonathan Green	Russ Nicholson	Russ Nicholson	500	Oct 2019	978-1911390749
5	TWAS - The Krampus Night Before Christmas	Jonathan Green	Tony Hough	Tony Hough	500	Dec 2019	978-1911390701
6	Dracula - Curse of the Vampire	Jonathan Green	Hauke Kock	Hauke Kock	1000	Oct 2021	978-1913525019
7	RONIN 47	Jonathan Green	Neil Googe	Neil Googe	600	Aug 2022	978-1913525187
8	Shakespeare Vs. Cthulhu: What Dreams May Come	Jonathan Green	Heraldo Mussolini	Heraldo Mussolini	600	Nov 2025	978-1838319649
9	100 Aker Wood	Jonathan Green	Heraldo Mussolini	Heraldo Mussolini	100	Jan 2027	978-1838319670
10	TBC	Jonathan Green	TBC	TBC	TBC	May 2027	TBC

A copy of The Wicked Wizard of Oz is on display in the All Things Oz Museum in Chittenango, New York, along with a set of bookmarks produced as rewards for backers of the Kickstarter that was run to fund production of the book.

== See also ==
- Fighting Fantasy
- Alice's Adventures in Wonderland
- The Wonderful Wizard of Oz
- Peter Pan and Wendy
- The Lost World
