= Jonathan Green (speculative fiction writer) =

British writer

- Born: October 12, 1971 (age 54); United Kingdom
- Occupation: Writer
- Writing career
- Period: 1993–present
- Website: jonathangreenauthor.blogspot.com

Jonathan Green is a freelance writer. He has written for various science fiction and fantasy franchises, including Doctor Who, Fighting Fantasy, Sonic the Hedgehog, and Games Workshop's Warhammer and Warhammer 40,000 game universes.

== Biography ==
Before becoming a full-time writer, Green was a teacher and deputy headmaster of a school in London.

Green wrote seven Fighting Fantasy gamebooks, co-wrote Steve Jackson's 40th anniversary title Secrets of Salamonis, and a history of the franchise. Green has written six novels for the Games Workshop Black Library label: Necromancer, Magestorm, The Dead and the Damned, Crusade for Armageddon, Conquest of Armageddon, and Iron Hands. He co-authored two Sonic the Hedgehog gamebooks for Puffin Books with Marc Gascoigne.

Green created the Pax Britannia science fiction steampunk series published by Abaddon Books, and wrote eight titles for the setting featuring a Victorian James Bond-style dandy adventurer called Ulysses Quicksilver.

== Bibliography ==
=== Non-fiction ===
- Go Gos Are Go Go (1997, ISBN 0-14-038675-0)
- Match Wits with the Kids (June 2008, ISBN 978-1848310001)
- What is Myrrh Anyway? (October 2008, ISBN 978-1848310278)
- YOU Are The Hero: A History of Fighting Fantasy Gamebooks (September 2014, ISBN 978-1-909679-38-2 and ISBN 978-1-909679-36-8)
- YOU Are The Hero Part 2: A History of Fighting Fantasy Gamebooks (September 2017)
- YOU Are The Hero: An Interactive History of Fighting Fantasy Gamebooks (August 2024)

=== Fiction ===
- Fighting Fantasy adventure gamebooks:
  - Spellbreaker (1993, ISBN 0-14-036427-7; 2007, ISBN 1-84046-807-6)
  - Knights of Doom (1994, ISBN 0-14-036978-3)
  - Curse of the Mummy (1995, ISBN 0-14-037553-8; 2007, ISBN 1-84046-802-5; 2011)
  - Bloodbones (2006, ISBN 1-84046-765-7; 2010, Wizard Books)
  - Howl of the Werewolf (2007, ISBN 1-84046-838-6; 2010, Wizard Books)
  - Stormslayer (2009, Wizard Books)
  - Night of the Necromancer (2010, Wizard Books)
  - Secrets of Salamonis (co-written with Steve Jackson, 2022, Scholastic Books)
- ACE Gamebooks:
  - Alice's Nightmare in Wonderland (2015, Snowbooks, ISBN 978-1909679597)
  - The Wicked Wizard of Oz (2015, Snowbooks, ISBN 978-1911390312)
  - Neverland: Here Be Monsters! (based on Peter and Wendy, The Lost World, The Time Machine and King Kong) (2019, Snowbooks, ISBN 978-1911390411)
  - Beowulf Beastslayer (2019, Snowbooks, ISBN 978-1911390664)
  - 'TWAS: The Krampus Night Before Christmas (2019, Snowbooks, ISBN 978-1911390701)
  - Dracula: Curse of the Vampire (based on Bram Stoker's Dracula, with elements of Nosferatu, Frankenstein, and The Lair of the White Worm) (2021, Snowbooks, ISBN 978-1913525002)
  - RONIN 47 (inspired by the Legend of the Forty-Seven Ronin and Kaiju films) (2022, Snowbooks, ISBN 978-1913525187)
  - Shakespeare Vs. Cthulhu: What Dreams May Come (inspired by Shakespeare's plays and the works of H. P. Lovecraft) (2025, ACE Gamebooks, ISBN 978-1838319649)
  - 100 Aker Wood (inspired by A A Milne's Winnie-the-Pooh stories, Pet Sematary by Stephen King, and Mythago Wood by Robert Holdstock) (2027, ACE Gamebooks, 978-1838319670)
- Sonic the Hedgehog gamebooks (with Marc Gascoigne, Puffin Books):
  - Theme Park Panic (1995, ISBN 0-14-037847-2)
  - Stormin' Sonic (1996, ISBN 0-14-037848-0)
- List of Black Library books:
  - The Dead and the Damned (December 2002, ISBN 1-84154-266-0)
  - Crusade for Armageddon (July 2003, ISBN 1-84416-025-4)
  - Magestorm (February 2004, ISBN 1-84416-074-2)
  - Iron Hands (August 2004, ISBN 1-84416-094-7)
  - Necromancer (February 2005, ISBN 1-84416-158-7)
  - Conquest of Armageddon (December 2005, ISBN 1-84416-196-X)
- Pax Britannia (Abaddon Books):
  - Unnatural History (February 2007, ISBN 1-905437-11-0)
  - Leviathan Rising (March 2008, ISBN 1-905437-60-9)
  - Human Nature (January 2009, ISBN 1-905437-86-2)
  - Evolution Expects (May 2009, ISBN 978-1906735050)
  - Blood Royal (August 2010, UK-ISBN 978-1-906735-30-2, US-ISBN 978-1-907519-37-6)
  - Dark Side (September 2011, UK-ISBN 978-1-906735-40-1, US-ISBN 978-1-906735-85-2)
  - Anno Frankenstein (May 2011, UK-ISBN 978-1907519444, US-ISBN 978-1907519451)
- Robin of Sherwood Novelizations:
  - Robin of Sherwood: The Knights Of The Apocalypse. (2016)
