= Tony Koltz =

American writer

Tony Koltz is an American writer who wrote two Choose Your Own Adventure books: number 31, The Vampire Express, and number 59, Terror Island. He cowrote The Battle for Peace and Before the First Shots are Fired: How America Can Win or Lose off the Battlefield with General Anthony Zinni and Battle Ready with Tom Clancy and Zinni.
