= Wolfgang Hohlbein =

German writer (born 1953)

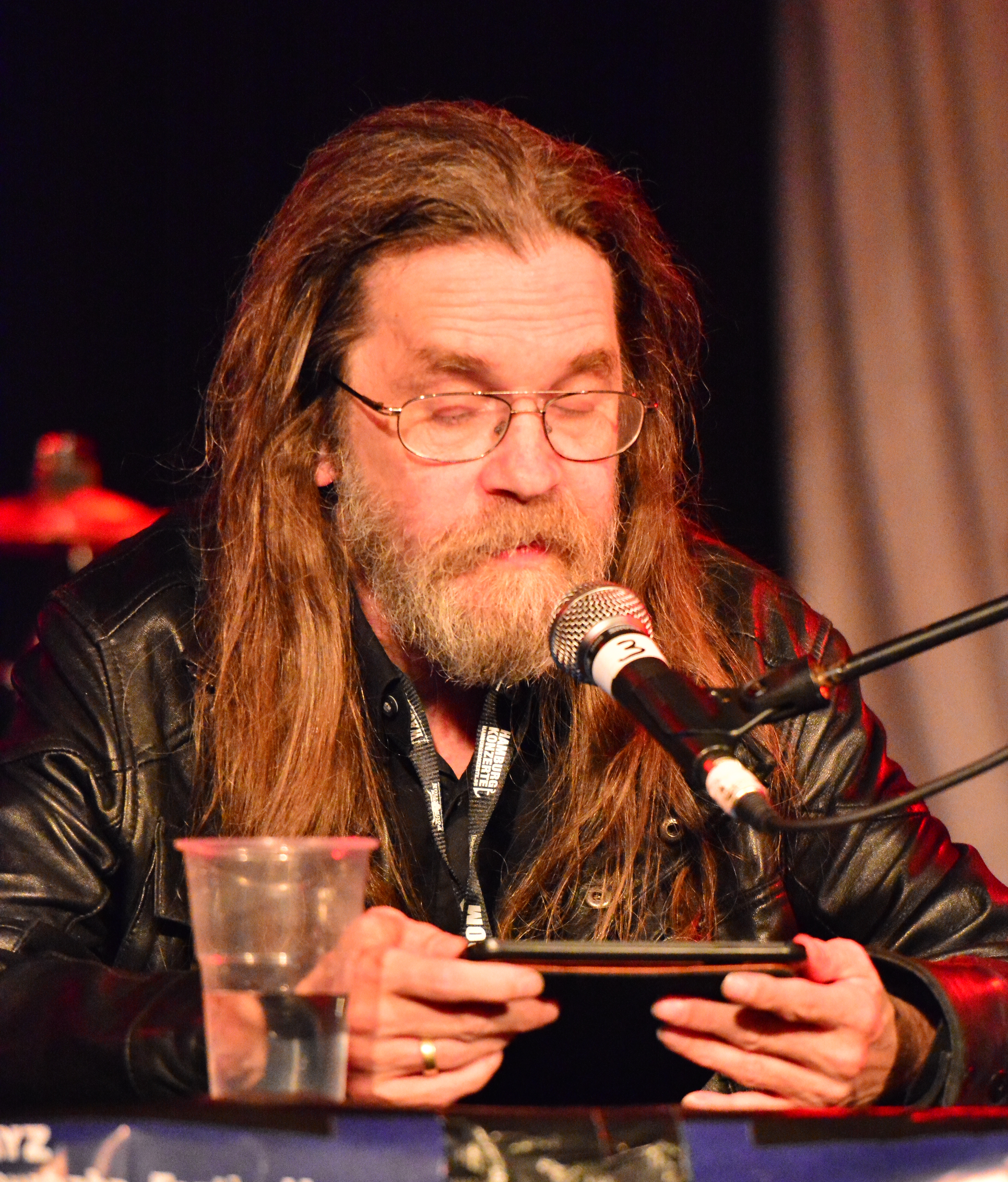
- Born: 15 August 1953 (age 73); Weimar, Thuringia, East Germany
- Occupation: Novelist
- Spouse: Heike Hohlbein
- Writing career
- Genres: Fantasy, science fiction, horror, thriller, children's literature, movie tie-in books, pulp fiction
- Notable work: Magic Moon series
- Website: hohlbein.net

Wolfgang Hohlbein (born 15 August 1953) is a German writer of science fiction, fantasy and horror fiction. His wife, Heike Hohlbein, is also a writer and they frequently collaborate. With more than 200 published books and more than 43 million sold copies he is considered one of the most successful German writers in the fantasy genre.

== Personal life ==
Wolfgang Hohlbein was born on 15 August 1953 in Weimar, Bezirk Erfurt. After finishing school, he took an apprenticeship as industrial clerk, a profession he then worked in for the following years. To bolster his income, he also worked as night watchman. It was during this period when he started to write his early works, to pass the time faster. In 1971 he met his wife Heike, whom he would marry three years later. Together they raised six children, including Rebecca Hohlbein (*1977), who would become an author as well. In 1982 he quit his job to work as a full-time author. Shortly after, he and his family moved to his wife's birth town of Neuss, North Rhine-Westphalia, where they live to this day.

In 2014 the German TV channel RTL II launched a reality show called Die Hohlbeins – Eine total fantastische Familie (The Hohlbein's, a fantastic family), which aimed to show the life of the Hohlbein family in the a docusoap format. The show garnered about 910,000 viewers during the first episode, but after a fast drop-off in viewers and negative criticism of being too trivial and boring it was cancelled soon after.

== Work ==
Writing short stories since a young age, Hohlbein was first recognized as an author after sending in a manuscript he and his wife had written at a fantasy and science fiction writing contest in 1982. They won and their book, Märchenmond (English title: "Magic Moon"), was published by Ueberreuter Verlag, soon becoming a bestseller and winning several awards. In the following years the Hohlbein's wrote two sequels to the book, continuing their success. The trilogy remains their greatest success until today and sold more than 2 million copies. He's also a writer of pulp fiction, including the series Der Hexer (The Warlock), which he conceived in 1984 for the magazine Gespenster-Krimi (Ghost Thriller) published by Bastei Lübbe, mainly based on H. P. Lovecraft's Cthulhu Mythos, and of which he wrote the majority of novels initially under the collective pen name of Robert Craven. Later the series was reedited and republished as paperbacks, which collected the stories of several pulp magazines, including a prequel, and as e-books both under Hohlbein's own name.

Hohlbein primarily writes in the genre of fantasy, horror and historical fiction. Since the success of Märchenmond Hohlbein had published more than 200 books. He sometimes cooperates with other authors like Dieter Winkler or his daughter Rebecca Hohlbein. His most important source of inspiration is his wife Heike Hohlbein, who is credited as co-author on more than 30 of his books. In his early days, Hohlbein also wrote a lot of paperback stories for various magazines and also often used a pseudonym. Later he focused more on stand-alone novels as well as some long-running book series, like the Enwor saga or the still not finished Chronik der Unsterblichen (Chronicles of the Immortals).

Apart from his own creations, Hohlbein also wrote various tie-in books for such franchises as Indiana Jones, Stargate and Pirates of the Caribbean.

== Reception ==
Wolfgang Hohlbein is among the most successful and prolific German fantasy authors. He has written more than 200 books and sold more than 43 million issues throughout his career.

Many of his books are translated and published internationally in various European countries as well as outside of Europe in countries such as South Korea. For many years none of his works had been translated into English, not even the eight Indiana Jones novels he wrote. His only works to be translated into English were his three Märchenmond novels, which were published by Tokyopop from 2006 onwards, now titled Magic Moon.

Hohlbein's books also have been adapted into other media such as radioplays. His work Märchenmond was translated into a theatre play, which has been presented in places like the Westfälisches Landestheater or the Theater für Niedersachsen. The German progressive metal band, Vanden Plas, recorded and consecutively released two full-length albums, Chronicles of the Immortals – Netherworld (Path One) in 2014 and Chronicles of the Immortals – Netherworld II in 2015, that were adapted from Blutnacht, a theater production based on the author's Die Chronik der Unsterblichen.

Throughout the years, various propositions have been made to turn some of his works into film, for example for Das Druidentor or Azrael, but none of these projects were realized. In September 2016 however, Constantin Film announced they will create a feature film based on his book Hagen von Tronje.

In 2020 Sony released a film called The Magic Kids: Three Unlikely Heroes, based on his book series Die Wolf-Gäng, about Vlad the vampire who moves to a new magical town and a special magical school, three of the year 7 children team up together as they all have their own problems - a fairy who is afraid of heights, a werewolf who is allergic to fur, and a vampire who can't stand blood. They soon discover that the town is controlled by a demon who is after one thing - a magical crystal that has been left by Vlad's mother that could bring back dark magical times if used improperly.
