= Give Yourself Goosebumps =

Children's horror gamebook series

Cover art for Give Yourself Goosebumps #17: Little Comic Shop of Horrors, illustrated by Mark Nagata.

Give Yourself Goosebumps is a children's horror fiction gamebook series by R. L. Stine. After the success of the original Goosebumps books, Scholastic Press decided to create this spin-off series in 1995.

50 books in the series, including the "special editions" were published between 1995 and 2000. All of the books in the series, with the exception of Please Don't Feed the Vampire, are now out of print.

== General plotline ==
For the most part, play is rather simple, as the books are novels with branching plots. The books are written in the second person and enlivened by puzzles or choices. Rather than reading simply from beginning to end, the reader is told to turn to a certain page at the bottom of the current page. At certain pages the reader will be given at least two choices of which page to turn to, depending on what they want the main character (one's self) to do. If the reader makes poor choices, the book may come to a "bad" ending that will feature a horrid fate for the main character, but the reader is always able to go back and choose a new choice.

There is also at least one page in each book that uses an alternative method to selecting each choice, and is done more by chance rather than the reader's decision. These include; "Tossing a Coin" (where "Heads" represents one page and "Tails" another) "Rolling a Die" ("Odd" and "Even" sides having their own pages), or the reader trying a challenge in real life (and turning to a different page depending on whether they were successful or not). This whole structure came from the then-popular Choose Your Own Adventure book series.

There are normally two "main stories" and one "side story" which have their own set of choices, and a certain decision - usually at the first two choices - that will determine which of the two "stories" the reader will be a part of. The side story will usually feature inside one of the two main stories, would consist of a small group of choices, and is usually more lighthearted than the rest of the book. There is sometimes a group of choices which contain one choice which is blatantly wrong (such as eating the blue eggs in Escape from Camp Run-For-Your-Life or failing to acknowledge the situation in Welcome to the Wicked Wax Museum as an emergency). If the reader makes one of these choices the book will break the fourth wall and demand that the reader turn back and choose a better option, or sometimes simply conclude. This literary trope is characteristic of many late 20th century Western works of metafiction.

The main character is never named and is usually of ambiguous gender to allow the reader to imagine themself as the main character regardless of gender. However, the occasional "he" slips through. There is typically a "friend character" who is named and gendered, and this character is normally present throughout the storyline. The only thing linking the main character in each story is that they are self-proclaimed "Goosebumps Experts".

=== Endings ===
Cover art for Give Yourself Goosebumps Special Edition #3: Trapped in the Circus of Fear, illustrated by Craig White.

Because of the choices and page connections, there are many ways the story can end. These vary depending on which book is being read, but largely the endings involve the reader's character dying, permanently metamorphosing into something other than human, getting trapped somewhere inescapable (implying that one will die eventually), being put in a state of immobility such as becoming a statue, or - if the correct choices are met - surviving the story. The ending pages are the only ones which have no choices, and simply have the words "The End" where the choices would usually be. Occasionally it will just say "End" because it is supposed to be part of the final sentence, or it will say something else appropriate.

There are also endings that combine the above options, such as being mutated, and then being killed because of whatever it is they are now or an almost "good" ending in which - despite the reader's metamorphosis - the ending is still relatively satisfying. In The Deadly Experiments of Dr. Eeek, the reader can metamorphose into a dog if the wrong choice is chosen, but still gets home in one ending, albeit stuck in dog form, and becoming a world-famous show dog. Not all bad choices will take the reader to a bad ending immediately; instead, they will sometimes take the reader to another page which has its own choices, but all of them will lead to a bad ending - this is because a previous choice has put the reader in an inescapable situation, where there is no chance of making it out alive, and although they do not die immediately from that choice, the reader has ultimately gotten "killed" by making that decision. Fortunately, the reverse occasionally happens as well; some choices will take the reader to a page with choices that all lead to a good ending.

In addition, each book involves at least one page where the reader's knowledge of the actual Goosebumps books is called into question. This can either involve them being asked a question relating to one of the actual Goosebumps books, or simply being faced with something that has previously appeared in Goosebumps that only a true Goosebumps fan would know how to respond to. For the questions, the reader is given the choice of turning to one of two pages - one where they give the correct answer and one where they give the wrong answer (which usually has some subtle similarities to the correct one). For the references, the reader is just given choices, which are blatant if they know what book the choices are referring to, but make no sense if they do not. Answering correctly will allow the story to continue, but answering incorrectly will normally result in death. There is at least one good ending in each book, as opposed to the 20+ scary endings (explained above).

== US and UK versions of covers ==
The covers were metallic and holographic, showing a basic design repeated on the cover background. One color colored the entire design, and the design would change slightly when the book was moved to different areas of light. The design itself changed with every book, although some of the designs are repeated, as in books 10, 12, 13, 16, 17, and 19. Three illustrators did the cover illustrations, the first was Tim Jacobus, who did the original series and Goosebumps Series 2000. Jacobus only did one cover, Escape from the Carnival of Horrors, and it is often mistaken for Mark Nagata, who illustrated the next 22 books, because Jacobus' signature is not visible on the front. It is, however, visible on the back, as it was obscured by Choose from over 20 Different Scary Endings! on the front. Mark Nagata illustrated the next book, Tick Tock, You're Dead!, throughout number 24, Lost in Stinkeye Swamp. Number 25, Shop Till You Drop... Dead!, was illustrated by Craig White, whose illustrations were made with computers and who illustrated the last 17 through number 42, All Day Nightmare and all 8 of the special edition books.

- In the UK, books 1-14 contained covers with the pictures almost completely obscured by an illustration of a slimy substance

- This occasionally obscured important parts of the cover (e.g. in Diary of a Mad Mummy, it is impossible to actually see the diary on the UK cover.) The later books of the UK had more detail to them and were no longer covered, but still had slightly less detail than the US version.

- The UK version did not sparkle like the US version.
- The US version had a tagline on the back of the books, the UK version did not
- The synopses between the UK/US were different.

The series was also published in french by Héritage Media in Québec, under the name Chair de Poule Extra ; only fourteen volumes were published, from july 1995 to january 1997.

== List of Give Yourself Goosebumps books ==
#	Title	Original published date	Pages	ISBN
01	Escape from the Carnival of Horrors	July 1995	135	0-590-55323-2
The reader and his or her 2 friends Patty and Brad wander into a haunted amusement park. There are 2 main storylines determined based on whether the reader chooses to go to the rides or the games. In addition to choices the reader can make about how the story unfolds, there are several games of chance that determine the reader's fate. Endings include blasting off to Mars for 2 decades, falling forever, bouncing forever on a trampoline, becoming stuck in a mirrored hallway, metamorphosing into a chicken, metamorphosing into a dummy for the Real-Life Space Display, metamorphosing into a ghost and being stuck together with Brad and Patty by a gluelike substance like Siamese triplets.
02	Tick Tock, You're Dead!	November 1995	135	0-590-56645-8
The reader's uncooperative younger brother Denny stumbles into a time travel experiment at a museum and the reader has 2 hours to bring Denny back before he ceases to exist. Endings include falling into quicksand, being eaten by crocodiles, being labeled as a "Couch Potato" in a zoo and exploding in space. Mark Nagata illustrated this book through Lost in Stinkeye Swamp, number 24.
03	Trapped in Bat Wing Hall	December 1995	137	0-590-56646-6
The reader is the new kid in town and so has no friends. The reader meets a young boy named Nick who invites the reader to join the "Horror Club" that meets in Bat Wing Hall. The reader then has to decide between going on a scavenger hunt around the house or searching for "the scariest item he/she can find". Endings include turning into a bat, being caught and being stuck in a bat house at the local zoo forever, turning to stone and running into the Swamp Monster.
04	The Deadly Experiments of Dr. Eeek	February 1996	130	0-590-67318-1
The reader's mother who works at Eeek Labs invites the reader and the reader's friend Sam to come wait for her at work. Though the reader is warned not to cause trouble, the first choice in the book is whether or not to explore the lab. If the reader decides to explore the lab, the book continues. Otherwise, the book just ends quickly. Going through the canine maze could lead the reader to turn into a German Shepherd. The players can also encounter a Vamporilla (a vampire-type gorilla) with 1 ending having it taken away by Tarzan.
05	Night in Werewolf Woods	April 1996	133	0-590-67319-X
The reader prepares for a fun filled vacation at WoodsWorld until rumors around the Kids Only Campfire reveal that the place is full of werewolves. There are 23 possible endings, three of which result in the entire thing having been a dream. Werewolves are not the only horrific element to the book as some endings involve trolls and metamorphoses into inanimate objects. This book is written in a different manner than the others, as several choices are about what happens to the character rather than what the character does.
06	Beware of the Purple Peanut Butter	June 1996	135	0-590-67320-3
The reader is spending the summer with his or her cousins Barney and Dora. Barney is a bully and Dora is a typical annoying little cousin. The reader's aunt and uncle don't want anyone in the basement. In the basement of the house, there is a refrigerator that holds a jar of a purple substance that smells like peanut butter and a box of some chocolate cake. The story depends on which the reader chooses to consume when they suddenly get hungry; eating the purple stuff shrinks the consumer with different results and eating the chocolate cake grows the consumer with different results.
07	Under the Magician's Spell	July 1996	135	0-590-67321-1
The reader, his or her little sister Joanie and their best friend Sid go to the mall, but Joanie runs into a magic shop and steals a magic book of magical spells while the reader is distracted. Later they come to know that the shop owner is an evil magician who wants his book back or he will make Joanie disappear into thin air.
08	The Curse of the Creeping Coffin	August 1996	132	0-590-84765-1
The reader is staying at his or her grandmother's house next to a cemetery. Ghosts start to appear around the house, but Grandma is unable to see and hear them. The reader is given the choice to either find out more about the ghosts by following one of them or get away from Grandma's house by going home.
09	The Knight in Screaming Armor	September 1996	136	0-590-84766-X
A suit of armor brought to The United States from England has a curse on it connected to the reader's family. 2 crates were shipped with the suit of armor, one marked "Good Knight" and the other marked "Evil Knight"; the reader must choose one to open. Endings include being age reversed into an infant and being turned into a flower or a bird.
10	Diary of A Mad Mummy	October 1996	136	0-590-84767-8
The reader is exploring a skyscraper shaped like a pyramid and examining an Egyptian mummy, finds a diary that seems to have been written by the corpse. Possible endings include finding the mummy's treasure, disintegrating into dust, drinking a sleeping potion and sinking into the La Brea Tar Pits.
11	Deep in the Jungle of Doom	November 1996	136	0-590-84768-6
The reader is on a class trip in the Amazon rainforest. The reader and his or her friend Zoe abandon the group and encounter a strange stone beast that chases them through the jungle as well as an encounter with a cave troll named Cronby. There were 2 major storylines of the book branch from the decision to either run into a clearing or toward a pool.
12	Welcome to the Wicked Wax Museum	December 1996	137	0-590-84772-4
A history class is taking a trip to the Wicked Wax Museum the day before it opens. The reader and his or her friends Jake and Liz misbehave and were told by their teacher that they are not allowed inside. Eventually, Jake decides to go inside and soon starts screaming, providing the reader with the first choice in the book: whether to go in after him or to go find help.
13	Scream of the Evil Genie	January 1997	137	0-590-84773-2
Coming home from school after a very tiring day, the reader takes a cola can out of the refrigerator. Once it is opened, a genie named Jenna dressed like a punk rocker, pops out, instead of cola. She grants the reader 3 wishes so long as they were neither violent likely to kill or injure someone else or menial household tasks. However the wishes should be spoken very precisely or else.
14	The Creepy Creations of Professor Shock	February 1997	135	0-590-84774-0
The reader takes a job cleaning the garage of an inventor named Professor Shock. Being told to avoid a particular door in the garage, the reader enters it anyway.
15	Please Don't Feed the Vampire!	March 1997	137	0-590-93477-5
The reader starts out with a costume called "Vampire in a Can" a cheesy vampire costume stuffed inside a can. The reader then finds a strange packet of red goo inside that will turn anyone who swallows it into a vampire. The 2 main storylines deal with either the reader turning into a vampire or the reader's pet poodle Fifi mutating into one.
16	Secret Agent Grandma	April 1997	131	0-590-84775-9
The reader's grandmother is waiting at the train station. When the reader arrives, there were 2 of her one on the platform and the other one on the train, claiming the one on the platform is a phony. The storyline the reader follows is determined by the choice of which grandma to accept as the real one. If the reader chooses the one on the platform, they will find that she is an alien in disguise. If the reader chooses the train one, they will discover that she is a secret agent out to destroy aliens. Both have various outcomes.
17	Little Comic Shop of Horrors	May 1997	137	0-590-93483-X
The reader walks through a creepy part of town and stumbles upon a new comic shop called Milo's Comics Dungeon whose owner Milo does not plan on ever letting the reader leave. Various endings include being trapped in a comic permanently, melting into nothing or being turned into a hundred-foot-tall green Godzilla like monster.
18	Attack of the Beastly Babysitter	June 1997	136	0-590-93485-6
The reader's mother has hired a babysitter named Zoe. Zoe has whiskers, claw-like fingernails and a pointy nose. Zoe provides the reader with a spinner that offers the choice between fun or games. Whatever it lands on determines which of the 2 main storylines the reader will follow. The spinner is reused for a couple of choices and there are a few activities to do in the "Games" section with a tattooed man named Dare. The Beast from the East is mentioned. Each of the storylines (including the side story) have only 1 good ending. Endings include: Being buried alive by rats, getting shredded into a Kid Grater, Zoe turning the reader into a rat, getting stuck with Dare for another week, and finally getting home via a DiskGoTech (a video game controller).
19	Escape from Camp Run For Your Life	July 1997	137	0-590-93489-9
The reader attends a summer sports camp called Camp Running Leaf that turns out to be run by alien invaders.
20	Toy Terror: Batteries Included	August 1997	137	0-590-93492-9
The reader wins a contest and is presented with the choice of 2 prizes: a tour of a toy factory or an Annihilator 3000 toy robot. If he or she choose the tour, the doll Nasty Kathy will attack him or her. If the toy is chosen, the robot starts annihilating the reader's house.
21	The Twisted Tale of Tiki Island	September 1997	137	0-590-93500-3
There is a curse that is rumored to haunt Tiki Island. Endings include turning into an octopus, falling into lava, getting banned from the island resort permanently, accidentally cursing themselves with the Tiki Eye and getting buried under a mountain of diamonds.
22	Return to the Carnival of Horrors	October 1997	137	0-590-21062-9
The reader revisits the Carnival of Horrors from the first Give Yourself Goosebumps book Escape From The Carnival of Horrors. Cousin Floyd accompanies the reader on the journey as does Patty who appeared in part 1. Endings include being eaten by hot dogs, being killed by slugs that spit acid, being buried under alphabet letters, getting eaten by a T-rex, being attacked by a squid, going to space, escaping back in time, escaping with the ghosts, turning into a crane prize, turning into a robot, becoming a skeleton and escaping with passes to The Carnival of Horrors.
23	Zapped in Space	November 1997	137	0-590-39774-5
The reader visits Madame Zapp's new virtual reality arcade. The 2 main storylines result from the decision to either play Arctic Adventure or Adrift off Vega. Arctic Adventure takes the reader to the Arctic where they encounter the Abominable Snowwoman; Adrift off Vega takes him or her to space where they are attacked by aliens. Beginning with this book, the covers take on a new style.
24	Lost in Stinkeye Swamp	December 1997	134	0-590-39775-3
The reader moves to a new house called Swamp House. It is ugly, rundown and haunted by a ghost named Annabelle, but there is treasure hidden in the grounds. In the basement, the reader finds a magic telescope and Annabelle's 2 century old diary.
25	Shop Till You Drop...Dead!	January 1998	133	0-590-39776-1
Reggie Mayfield tells the reader that there were monsters in his father Mr. Mayfield's department store. The reader and his or her friend Julie try to prove that Reggie is lying by going to the department store at midnight and spending an hour there. This is the first book in the series to have a largely non-linear storyline. It also uses an item collection system. Although previous books have contained at least 1 page that use one, it is the first time that an item check has been used as the main theme in the book's storyline. Craig White illustrated this cover, and continued to do so throughout the series and its special editions.
26	Alone in Snakebite Canyon	March 1998	137	0-590-39997-7
The reader, his or her parents and annoying older brother Pete go to Lonestar National Park. While camping in the desert, the reader finds a shop and can buy one of 2 valuable items: a pair of magic snake eyes that allow the wearer to shapeshift into different animals or a map to an old, deadly gold mine. If the reader chooses the magic snake eyes, the reader may shapeshift into any of several different animals including a bear, a fish, and a falcon, while the choice of the map results in the necessity to solve a riddle.
27	Checkout Time at the Dead End Hotel	April 1998	140	0-590-39998-5
The reader and his or her friends check into a rundown hotel on the side of an abandoned highway. The hotel turns out to be inhabited by ghosts and the only way out is to locate the only other normal resident. Jenna from Scream of the Evil Genie makes a cameo appearance.
28	Night of a Thousand Claws	June 1998	137	0-590-40034-7
The reader and family go on vacation to Cat Cay which is inhabited by strange cat like creatures. Endings include getting attacked by ghostly cats, sinking on a motorboat, turning invisible forever, a fatal fall off a rope and suffocating in a sandstorm.
29	Invaders from the Big Screen	July 1998	137	0-590-40289-7
The reader visits a theatre where the characters in the films come to life. The initial choice is between watching a King Kong like monster film called "Going Ape in Blastovision", a spy thriller called "Agent Z vs. Dr. Aqua" and a horror film called "House of A Hundred Horrors".
30	You're Plant Food!	September 1998	136	0-590-41974-9
The reader is on a school field trip to the E. Ville Creeper Botanical Gardens. In order to complete the book successfully, the reader must manage an inventory and determine the best order in which to carry out actions. One of the 2 main storylines is characterized by an early choice that determines whether or not the book can be completed successfully.
31	The Werewolf of Twisted Tree Lodge	November 1998	137	0-590-46306-3
The reader wins a contest writing a horror story called "Revenge of the Werewolves" and the prize is admission to a horror convention featuring famous horror writers at a place called Twisted Tree Lodge. What nobody knows is that the reader didn't actually write the story as he or she found it in a trash can. The story the reader "wrote" starts coming true at the convention. Soon, everyone is metamorphosing into werewolves as the reader sees as mysterious man in black. The reader must also contend with appearances by vampires and zombies.
32	It's Only a Nightmare	December 1998	137	0-590-76785-2
The reader is staying at an inn that seems peculiar. Falling asleep, the reader has nightmares about such things as metamorphosing into a bat and other people mutating into aliens. The reader must then find a way to escape his or her dreams while encountering the Sleep Master and the evil Lord Morphos. This book has many more endings than the others in the series, which include falling asleep for 7 decades (in the style of Sleeping Beauty), metamorphosing into a robot, getting sucked into a black hole, being transformed into a plate of food and eaten by the popular kids at school, being drowned by an overflow of mustard at a restaurant, having an embarrassing experience to a Walt Disney World-esque theme park, being trapped in a computer, getting blown up by a dynamite and being stuck in the dream world forever.
33	It Came from the Internet!	February 1999	135	0-590-51665-5
Another book with only 1 storyline, this book involves the reader installing a web crawler onto a computer that develops a virus that can come out of the computer and bite people. The reader may choose to seek help either from a strange computer-hacking teenager or from a doctor who makes strange suggestions.
34	Elevator To Nowhere	March 1999	136	0-590-51670-1
The reader and his or her classmate Jamie visit her uncle Darius for ideas to complete a science project. Darius is an inventor and has recently invented a transvator which he claims can take him to other universes where everything is the same except for one deadly difference. After Darius enters the transvator, the Darius who returns is from a universe of headhunters and the reader must decide whether to attempt to capture headhunter Darius or to enter the transvator in order to find the Darius who belongs in the reader's universe. Endings include being beheaded (in various ways), having your neck broken and being eaten by bugs.
35	Hocus Pocus Horror	April 1999	137	0-590-51673-6
At a magic show, the reader sneaks backstage and finds Mysterio the Magician's bag of tricks. Even though the label reads "DO NOT TOUCH!", the reader opens up the bag. Inside are a magic wand, disappearing powder, and reappearing spray. The reader's character is portrayed with more compassion than other books in the series - their main goal in the storyline is to get a dog to a safe location.
36	Ship of Ghouls	May 1999	137	0-590-51723-6
The reader and a friend are taking a fortnight long cruise to Japan. A fellow passenger says that people are doing experiments on the boat that were causing passengers to mutate into fish like creatures and will blow up the ship. The reader has to choose between telling the captain about the bomb threat or jumping off in order to get away from the explosion.
37	Escape From Horror House	July 1999	135	0-590-51682-5
This book focuses on the reader getting rid of a poltergeist that has haunted a house, not trying to get out of a haunted house. In most of the endings, the reader is killed by the poltergeist.
38	Into the Twister of Terror	August 1999	133	0-590-51706-6
The reader is sucked into a tornado that turns out to be sentient after being unable to make it into the storm cellar in time. There are also talking animals within the tornado.
39	Scary Birthday To You	September 1999	140	0-590-99390-9
The reader is thrown a horror themed birthday party that is hosted by a strange entertainer named Dr. MacDeath while the reader's parents have to work late. The reader must choose to either open gifts or play party games. The gifts were violent motor powered toys and all the "games" involve different outcomes.
40	Zombie School	November 1999	144	0-590-99397-6
The reader is transferred to a boarding school where all of the kids were very quiet. The reader plays a prank and steal his or her teacher's monocle which when worn reveals secret brainwashing messages written over all the walls. This leads to the discovery that all the students are being mind controlled by the teachers who were plotting to take over the world. From there, the story will either follow the reader's attempts to escape the school or to survive the day's classes.
41	Danger Time	January 2000	135	0-439-12186-8
The reader enters a creepy-looking clock store and attempts to help Chronos the store owner. The storyline focuses on time travel and attempting to return to the proper time. The reader also encounter the Time Police who attempt to track the reader down and personifications of the star signs called the Zodiacs who will either help or harm the reader.
42	All-Day Nightmare	February 2000	137	0-439-13530-3
After having had horrific nightmares, the reader wakes up to discover that his or her surroundings were not what would be expected. The reader has amnesia and is trapped in a creepy house. Depending on whether he or she chooses to sneak out the window or hide in the attic, the reader will face either aliens, werewolves or secret agents.
Special Edition
01	Into The Jaws of Doom	February 1998	135 (238 sections)	0-590-39777-X
The reader is on a school trip to a museum. Lagging behind the others, the reader encounters a murderous sentient computer. Endings include being killed by the Visible Man and getting eaten by a tyrannosaurus skeleton.
02	Return To Terror Tower	May 1998	136	0-590-39999-3
Return to Terror Tower follows the events of A Night in Terror Tower with Sue and Eddie being the reader's friends now. They request the reader's help in reclaiming their rightful throne and overthrowing their evil king of an uncle who is ruling their village while escaping the capture of the king's knights and being sent to the Lord High Executioner.
03	Trapped in the Circus of Fear	August 1998	131	0-590-41920-X
The reader and his or her friend Richie do a great performance at a circus camp. As a reward, they were allowed to participate in a real circus. At the beginning of the book, the reader must choose only 3 items out of a list to take to the circus.
04	One Night in Payne House	October 1998	135	0-590-43378-4
The reader and his or her friend Trevor were fans of a horror movie that takes place in Payne House. The 2 decide to spend a night there as a result of a dare. The horrific elements of the movie however turn out to be real. It forces the reader to choose only 3 items before starting their adventure, but it is also possible to collect more items in Payne House.
05	The Curse of the Cave Creatures	January 1999	136	0-590-18734-1
The reader goes exploring in a cave, finds an animal skull and drops it. Suddenly a shaman appears and says that the reader has displeased the cave spirit. The reader is presented with the choice of either turning into a spellcaster or a hunter and then battling the corresponding creatures. Endings include being thrown off a cliff by a giant bird, being stuck forever in the Lost Land, accidentally stopping all time forever and switching places with the Cave Spirit.
06	Revenge of the Body Squeezers	June 1999	134	0-590-51674-4
In this sequel to Invasion of the Body Squeezers Part 1 and 2, Jack Archer the protagonist of the first book, is the reader's friend. Returning from a trip, the reader finds out about Jack's experience fending off the alien invasion of Body Squeezers and soon learns that a second invasion is coming. At one point, the reader may choose to hammer a pick-axe into Leonard Nimoy's star on the Hollywood Walk of Fame in an attempt to save Los Angeles from the Body Squeezers.
07	Trick or....Trapped!	October 1999	135	0-590-99393-3
The reader is in a rich area of town going trick-or-treating. The reader's initial choice is to choose from entering one of the 5 colored houses all of which are in front of a mansion. If he or she survives, his or her time in the chosen house, the reader will sometimes be given the chance to choose a different house, but at other times, the reader will have to continue to the mansion. There are items to collect in some of the houses and missing some of them may lead to a bad ending. The reader's goal is to survive his or her time in the mansion, but it is impossible to do so without entering at least 1 house first.
08	Weekend At Poison Lake	December 1999	135	0-590-99652-5
This book almost has 4 fully distinct main storylines. The reader and his or her friend Nathan or his or her family (depending on the storyline) go on a weekend trip to Poison Lake. Some rumors have been going around that the lake is actually poisoned and thus should not be swam in. Rather than providing the reader with a choice in order to determine which storyline is followed, this book requires the reader to pick a lucky number. The number is then employed at several points throughout the book, making the course of the story more random than voluntary.
