= Ueberreuter =

Austrian publishing house

Ueberreuter (full: German: der Verlag Carl Ueberreuter) is an Austrian publishing house now based in Berlin, Germany. Founded as Verlag Carl Ueberreuter in 1946 by Thomas F. Salzer (de), today the company is Austria's biggest publisher of non-fiction literature.

Ueberreuter's catalogue includes The Chronicles of Narnia series by C.S. Lewis, as well as the first five Captain Underpants books by Dav Pilkey.
