= Byron Preiss =

American writer, editor, and publisher

Byron C. Preiss
- Byron Preiss, photographed in 2000
- Born: April 11, 1953; Brooklyn, New York City, U.S.
- Died: July 9, 2005 (aged 52); East Hampton, New York, U.S.
- Education: University of Pennsylvania; Stanford University
- Occupations: Writer, editor, publisher
- Spouse: Sandi Mendelson
- Writing career
- Genres: Fantasy, illustrated novels, audiobooks, digital publishing
- Notable works: The Words of Gandhi; Dragonworld; The Secret: A Treasure Hunt
- Notable awards: Inkpot Award (1977)

Byron Preiss (April 11, 1953 – July 9, 2005) was an American writer, editor, and publisher. He founded and served as president of Byron Preiss Visual Publications, and later of ibooks Inc. Many of his projects were in the forms of graphic novels, comics, illustrated books, and children's books. Beyond traditional printed books, Preiss frequently embraced emerging technologies, and was recognized as a pioneer in digital publishing and as among the first to publish in such formats as CD-ROM books and ebooks.

== Biography ==
=== Early life and career ===
A native of Brooklyn, New York City, Byron Preiss graduated magna cum laude from the University of Pennsylvania in 1972, and earned a master's degree in communications from Stanford University.

In 1971, while Preiss was teaching at a Philadelphia elementary school, he conceived, and with Jim Steranko, produced an anti-drug comic book, The Block, designed for low-level reading skills. Published by Steranko's company, Supergraphics, it was distributed to schools nationwide.

He founded Byron Preiss Visual Publications in 1974 to publish original works, including Weird Heroes (1975). His 1976 Fiction Illustrated series of illustrated novels began with Schlomo Raven: Public Detective, a Preiss collaboration with Tom Sutton; followed by Starfawn, illustrated by Stephen Fabian; Steranko's Chandler: Red Tide; and the 1977 Son of Sherlock Holmes, illustrated by Ralph Reese. Other publications included a 1978 adaptation of Alfred Bester's The Stars My Destination as a two-volume graphic novel, illustrated by Howard Chaykin.

=== Publishing career ===
As a comics packager and book packager, he developed titles for such publishers as HarperCollins and Random House. One such project, created in conjunction with the Bank Street College of Education, resulted in a series of educational comic books adapting well-known genre authors: The Bank Street Book of Creepy Tales, The Bank Street Book of Fantasy, The Bank Street Book of Mystery and The Bank Street Book of Science Fiction.

He published children's books by celebrities, including Billy Crystal, Jane Goodall, Jay Leno, LeAnn Rimes and Jerry Seinfeld, and worked closely with such established illustrators as Ralph Reese, William Stout and Tom Sutton.

Preiss was co-author, with Michael Reaves, of the children's novel Dragonworld (Doubleday, 1979), with 80 illustrations by Joseph Zucker. Dragonworld was originally planned to be the fifth Fiction Illustrated title.

In 1982, Preiss published The Secret, a puzzle book that combined 12 short verses and 12 elaborate fantasy paintings by John Jude Palencar. Readers were expected to pair each painting with a verse in a way that would provide clues to finding one of 12 plexiglass boxes buried in various parks around North America. Each box contained a ceramic box that contained a key that could be redeemed for a jewel worth $1,000. The book was inspired by the success of Masquerade, written and illustrated by Kit Williams and published in England in August 1979, but The Secret never led to the same level of treasure hunting frenzy. One of the ceramic boxes was found in Chicago in 1983, one in Cleveland in 2004, and one in Boston in October 2019. The remaining nine boxes have yet to be found, and reportedly Preiss was the only one who knew where they were when he died.

He edited the recording of the audiobook The Words of Gandhi, released by Caedmon in 1984 and narrated by Ben Kingsley, who won a Grammy Award in the category of Best Spoken Word or Non-Musical Recording for the work.

=== Later life and death ===
Preiss was married to Sandi Mendelson, with whom he had daughters Karah and Blaire.

On July 9, 2005, he died in a traffic accident at East Hampton, New York, on Long Island: Preiss, turning left at an intersection onto Montauk Highway, was involved in a collision with a Hampton Jitney bus traveling at or around 30 mph (48,3 km/h). The airbag did not work. Preiss died almost instantly.

Both Byron Preiss Visual Publications and ibooks Inc. filed for Chapter 7 Bankruptcy on February 22, 2006, after his death.

== List of Byron Preiss publications ==
Published by Preiss, or packaged by Preiss for other publishers

- The Electric Company Joke Book (1973) ISBN 0-307-64824-9
- The Silent e's from Outer Space (Western Pub., 1973; Goldencraft, 1974 ISBN 0-307-64821-4)
- One Year Affair (1976) ISBN 0-911104-86-0
- Weird Heroes (Pyramid Books, 1975–77)

Vol. 1 (ISBN 0-515-03746-X) to Vol. 8 (ISBN 0-515-04257-9); collections of illustrated, pulp-inspired stories

- Fiction Illustrated #1 – Schlomo Raven: Public Detective (Pyramid Books, 1976; by Preiss and Tom Sutton)
- Fiction Illustrated #2 – Starfawn (Pyramid Books, 1976; by Preiss and Stephen Fabian)
- Fiction Illustrated #3 – Chandler: Red Tide (Pyramid Books, 1976 ISBN 0-515-04241-2; Dark Horse, 2001 ISBN 1-56971-438-X)
- Fiction Illustrated #4 – Son of Sherlock Holmes (Pyramid Books, 1977; by Preiss and Ralph Reese)
- Empire (Berkley Windhover and Byron Preiss Visual Publications, 1978) by Samuel R. Delany, illustrated by Howard Chaykin. ISBN 0-425-03900-5
- More Than Human (HM Communications & Simon & Schuster, 1979) – adaptation of the Theodore Sturgeon novel of the same name, by Doug Moench and Alex Niño
- The Illustrated Roger Zelazny (Ace Books, 1979), illustrated by Gray Morrow ISBN 978-0441365258
- The Beach Boys (1979; revised ed. 1983 ISBN 0-312-07026-8)
- The Art of Leo and Diane Dillon (1981) ISBN 0-345-28449-6
- The Dinosaurs (1981; revised 2000 as The New Dinosaurs)
- The Secret (1982) ISBN 0-553-01408-0 – illustrated by John Jude Palencar
- The First Crazy Word Book: Verbs (1982) ISBN 0-531-04500-5
- The Little Blue Brontosaurus (1983) ISBN 0-89845-165-5
- Not the Webster's Dictionary (1983) ISBN 0-671-47418-9
- Be an Interplanetary Spy (Bantam Books, 1983–1985) — series of twelve interactive children's science fiction books, illustrated by Marc Hempel, Mark Wheatley, Tom Sutton, Alex Niño, Dennis Francis, and others
- The Bat Family (1984) ISBN 0-89845-237-6
- Time Machine — series of twenty-five historical children's interactive books; illustrators include Jim Steranko
- Nuts! (1985) ISBN 0-553-24725-5
- The Planets (1985) ISBN 0-553-05109-1
- The Universe (1987) ISBN 0-553-05227-6
- Dragonsword, 1st edition (1988) ISBN 1-55802-003-9
- The Microverse (1989) ISBN 0-553-05705-7
- First Contact: The Search for Extraterrestrial Intelligence (1990) ISBN 0-7472-3508-2
- Tales from the One-Eyed Crow: The Vulgmaster by Dennis L. McKiernan and Alex Nino (1991) ISBN 9780451450883
- The Ultimate Dracula (1991) ISBN 0-7472-0552-3
- The Ultimate Frankenstein (1991) ISBN 0-440-50352-3
- The Ultimate Werewolf (1991 reissue ISBN 0-440-50354-X)
- The Ultimate Dinosaur: Past, Present, and Future (1992) ISBN 0-553-07676-0
- The Vampire State Building (1992) ISBN 0-553-15998-4
- The Ultimate Zombie (1993) ISBN 0-440-50534-8
- The Ultimate Witch (1993) ISBN 0-440-50531-3
- Kurt Vonnegut's Slaughterhouse Five: The Multimedia Experience (1994) — interactive book
- The Ultimate Dragon (1995) ISBN 0-440-50630-1
- The Ultimate Alien (1995) ISBN 0-440-50631-X
- The Best Children's Books in the World (1996) ISBN 0-8109-1246-5
- Nine Princes in Amber, originally by Roger Zelazny, adapted by Terry Bisson and drawn by Lou Harrison, Bryn Barnard, and Tom Roberts (3 issues, 1996, DC Comics)
- The Guns of Avalon, originally by Roger Zelazny, adapted by Terry Bisson and drawn by Christopher Schenck and Andrew Pepoy (3 issues, 1996, DC Comics)
- The Rhino History of Rock 'n' Roll: The '70s (1997) ISBN 0-671-01175-8
- Are We Alone in the Cosmos? The Search for Alien Contact in the New Millennium (1999) ISBN 0-671-03892-3
- The New Dinosaurs (2000) ISBN 0-7434-0724-5
- The Roadkill of Middle Earth (2001) by John Carnell, illustrated by Tom Sutton, cover by Steve Fastner and Rich Larson. ISBN 0-7434-3467-6
- Battlestar Galactica: Resurrection (2001) by Richard Hatch and Stan Timmons; ibooks. ISBN 0-7434-1326-1
- Dying Inside (2002) ISBN 0-7434-3508-7
- The Ultimate Dragon (2003) ISBN 0-7434-5868-0
- The Best Bizarre But True Stories Ever! (2003) ISBN 978-0-7434-4557-3
- Exploring The Matrix: Visions of the Cyber Present (2004) ISBN 0-312-31359-4
- Raymond Chandler's Philip Marlowe (2005) ISBN 1-59687-847-9
- Year's Best Graphic Novels, Comics & Manga (2005) ISBN 0-312-34326-4

== Dragonworld ==
Dragonworld, the illustrated children's novel by Byron Preiss and Michael Reaves, was published in several editions from 1979 to 2005:

- Doubleday hardcover, 1979
- Bantam / Dell paperback, (1979) ISBN 0-553-01077-8
- Spectra paperback (July 1983) ISBN 0-553-25857-5
- Bantam / Dell paperback (Aug. 1983) ISBN 0-553-23426-9
- ibooks, Inc. paperback (2000) ISBN 0-671-03907-5
- ibooks, Inc. ebook (Microsoft Reader; 2001)
- ibooks, Inc. paperback (2002) ISBN 0-7434-5253-4
- ibooks, Inc. paperback (2005) ISBN 1-59687-233-0
