= Chandler: Red Tide =

Book by Jim Steranko

- Chandler: Red Tide (1976); Painted cover by writer-artist Jim Steranko
- Author: Jim Steranko
- Illustrator: Jim Steranko
- Cover artist: Jim Steranko
- Series: Fiction Illustrated Vol. 3
- Genre: Graphic Novel, Historical Fiction
- Publisher: Pyramid Books
- Publication date: 1976
- Publication place: United States
- Media type: Print (paperback)

Chandler: Red Tide is a 1976 illustrated novel, an early form of graphic novel, by writer-artist Jim Steranko.

The digest-sized book combines typeset text with two same-sized illustrations per page, utilizing no word balloons or other traditional comics text conventions. A hard-boiled detective novel in the film noir style, its protagonist is a private detective named Chandler (an homage to author Raymond Chandler) who is hired by a man who claims to have been poisoned by the same people responsible for a notorious gangland slaying. As Chandler tracks down witnesses, each begins to turn up dead.

== Publication history ==
Newsstand edition, distributed by Curtis Circulation (see logo, top left), stressing Fiction Illustrated series. Note "Vol. 3" at top right.

Packaged by Byron Preiss Visual Publications and published by Pyramid Books, under vice-president Norman Goldfein, in 1976, Chandler was written, drawn, and colored by veteran comics creator Jim Steranko. There is an introduction by crime novelist and former San Francisco private detective Joe Gores, and a foreword by Preiss. The original cover price was one dollar.

Preiss said the book was "created to retail at American newsstands alongside hundreds of other paperback offerings". The mass-market edition (ISBN 0-515-04078-9), which Preiss said had a "50,000+ press run", was the third in a series from the publisher, and also known as Fiction Illustrated Vol. 3. (See image at left.) It was supplemented by a separate edition for bookstores that was double the dimensions of the newsstand edition. Steranko, through his company Supergraphics, additionally offered the latter in a limited edition of 750 with a signed and numbered signature plate.

Steranko in 1978 recalled the project's genesis:

Chandler was a fill-in book. That particular number of [the] Fiction Illustrated [series] was to have been Ralph Reese's Sherlock Holmes book [eventually published as Fiction Illustrated No. 4 — Son of Sherlock Holmes (1977)]. Ralph had worked on it for a year, and Byron realized ... that the book couldn't get out in time. He asked me if I would do a book to replace it. There are two men you never ask to fill in on a late deadline: Neal Adams and myself. We're both overcommitted. Byron's a good friend and I tried to do what I could for him, so I said I would do this book. It was produced in 2½ months where it should have taken at least six months to do. It was my first visual novel, and it was a major project.

He elsewhere said that in creating the book he used golden sectioning, "a mathematical formula to arrange elements in a unified structure, to create an image-to-text relationship that readers would be very comfortable with. The text on any given page related only to that page".

Steranko, who retained rights to the character, was then assigned to create a 12-page "Chandler" story for Penthouse magazine, working with executive editor Art Cooper. When Cooper departed Penthouse, the project was canceled and Steranko was paid a kill fee.

Dark Horse Comics had planned to publish a revised edition of Chandler: Red Tide in December 1999, with revamped and more hardboiled art and text by Steranko, but this did not see fruition. Dark Horse Presents vol. 3, No. 3 (Aug. 2011) included a 13-page Chapter 1 of Red Tide.

== Reception ==
Print featuring the title character. Art by Jim Steranko.

Chandler: Red Tide did not meet sales expectations, with Steranko recalling in 2003 that, "When the book appeared it was not embraced by the comic-book community because it didn't have word balloons or captions. Believe it or not, they found that shocking!" In 1978, shortly after the book's publication, he said, "I was disappointed in Pyramid's distribution and promotion of it. ... They did a major mailing on it, but there was more that can be done".

== Illustrated-novel format ==
Chandler: Red Tide is similar to Harold Foster's comic strip Prince Valiant in that the narrative is carried by a combination of graphics and text blocks without word balloons. Steranko used the term "graphic novel" in his introduction, though it was labeled "a visual novel" on the cover.
