= Weird Heroes =

Weird Heroes, subtitled "New American Pulp", was an American series of novels and anthologies produced by Byron Preiss in the 1970s that dealt with new heroic characters inspired by pulp magazine characters.

The series was 'packaged' by Byron Preiss Visual Productions and was published by Pyramid/Jove/HBJ. Four of the books are anthologies, four are novels. During the same time, Preiss also produced the Fiction Illustrated series with the same publisher.

Most of the characters were never seen after the demise of Weird Heroes. Preiss did write one novel about his character Guts, and planned a second. This was published by Ace Books, maybe as part of a 'revival' of the concept as single novels. Tor Books reprinted Philip José Farmer's Greatheart Silver stories in a single volume with new art and Reaves's character Kamus appeared in two books by other publishers. Ron Goulart's "Quest of the Gypsy" was meant to be a series of novels but only two have been published.

The first volume was reprinted by iBooks; but as iBooks entered bankruptcy following Preiss's death, it is unlikely that further volumes will be reprinted.

== Series ==
- Weird Heroes #1
  - Greatheart Silver in the Showdown at Shootout, Philip José Farmer
  - Quest of the Gypsy, Ron Goulart
  - Adam Stalker: The Darkstar File, Archie Goodwin
  - Rose in the Sunshine State, Joann Kobin
  - Guts, the Cosmic Greaser, Byron Preiss
- Weird Heroes #2
  - Doc Phoenix, Ted White
  - Cordwainer Bird in "The New York Review of Bird", Harlan Ellison
  - The Camden Kid, Charlie Swift
  - Viva, Steve Engelhart
  - Na and the Dredspore of Gruaga, graphic tale written and illustrated by Alex Niño
  - SPV 166, The Underground Express, Elliot S. Maggin
  - The Return of Greatheart Silver, Philip José Farmer
- Weird Heroes #3: Quest of the Gypsy, Ron Goulart
- Weird Heroes #4: Nightshade: Terror, Inc., Tappan King & Beth Meacham
- Weird Heroes #5: Doc Phoenix: The Oz Encounter, Marv Wolfman/Ted White
- Weird Heroes #6
  - Shinbet Investigates, Ron Goulart
  - Orion, Ben Bova
  - 50 Years of Heroes: The Edmond Hamilton Papers, Edmond Hamilton
  - Greatheart Silver in the First Command, Philip José Farmer
  - Galactic Gumshoe: a Franklin Davis Thriller, Arthur Byron Cover
- Weird Heroes #7: Quest of the Gypsy: Eye of the Vulture, Ron Goulart
- Weird Heroes #8
  - Seward: The Deep Fix, Michael Moorcock
  - Kamus: The Big Spell, J. Michael Reaves
  - Orion 2: Flood Tide, Ben Bova
  - Kamus 2: The Maltese Vulcan, Reaves
  - Robeson: The Grant-Robeson Papers "Savage Shadow", Maxwell Grant (Philip Jose Farmer)

== Reprints and follow ons ==
- I, Alien (Michael Reaves) Ace Books, 1979.
- Guts (Byron Preiss) Ace Books, 1979.
  - Produced by BPVP for Ace. Illustrated like WH was, in many ways a continuation of WH. "Guts" first appeared in WH#1. A second Guts book and a second `I--Alien' book ('I--Alien in NY') were promised, but not published.
- Darkworld Detective (J. Michael Reaves) Bantam Books, 1982.
  - Reprints first 2 Kamus stories from WH#8 plus 2 `new' ones.
- Kamus of Kadizhar: The Black Hole of Carcosa (John Shirley) St Martin's, 1988.
  - contains character from WH#8.
- Greatheart Silver (Philip José Farmer) Tor Books, 1982.
  - reprints GHS stories from WH
- Orion (Ben Bova)
- Dragonworld (Byron Preiss and J. Michael Reaves, art by Joseph Zucker) Bantam Books, 1979.
  - Actually planned as fifth "Fiction Illustrated" work.
- Oz Encounter Marv Wolfman, based on an idea by Ted White, Hungry Tiger Press, ISBN 1-929527-09-8
  - hardback reprint of the Doc Phoenix novel
