= Blood of the Innocent =

Blood of the Innocent is a comic book miniseries created by Rickey Shanklin, Marc Hempel and Mark Wheatley which was published by WaRP Graphics in 1985.

== About the series ==
Blood of the Innocent was one of the first American comic books to be published weekly over four weeks. It was written by Rickey Shanklin and Mark Wheatley, and drawn by Marc Hempel and Mark Wheatley, who had previously created the acclaimed science fiction comic Mars for First Comics. Blood of the Innocent was their first attempt at a horror comic. An epilogue for the miniseries appears in the first (and only) issue of WaRP Graphics Annual, along with other short stories by authors and artists then being published by WaRP.

The miniseries pitted Dracula against Jack the Ripper (who in this story is a psychotic Prince Albert Victor, Duke of Clarence) in Victorian London. It is a prequel to Bram Stoker's novel Dracula.
