= Greatheart Silver =

1982 novel by Philip José Farmer

- First English-language edition Cover by Howard Chaykin
- Author: Philip José Farmer
- Genre: Science fiction
- ISBN: 978-0-523-48535-5
- OCLC: 8481984

Greatheart Silver is a 1982 science fiction novel written by Philip José Farmer. It is a collection of three of Farmer's stories from the series Weird Heroes published in the 1970s with the title character, a lineal descendant of Thomas Jefferson and Sally Hemings, working for the Acme Zeppelin Corporation as a blimp pilot and private detective.

== Plot summary ==
Greatheart Silver, the thirty-year-old first mate on Acme Zeppelin 8, is the sole survivor of an attack by the Mad Fokker, an air pirate and World War I veteran who was mothballed by the United States government because it could not undo his mental conditioning. Bendt Micawber (the CEO of Acme Corporation and the descendant of Mr. Micawber from David Copperfield) cites his survival as dereliction of duty. Receiving a plastic prosthetic leg as well as his pension as compensation, Greatheart is fired from Acme. During his recovery, Greatheart's fiancee breaks up with him and his Sioux grandmother sends him a birdcage with two ravens inside. He names them Huginn and Muninn after the Norse god Odin's all-seeing ravens.

Using his skills with computers to alter his records and receive a glowing reference from Micawber, Greatheart is soon employed by the Phoenix branch of Acme Security-Southwest. Under the tutelage of Fenwick Phwombly (who describes himself, though is never identified, as the Shadow), Greatheart journeys to the town of Shootout, where many aging villains have gathered for a last great crime. However, they are stopped by a group of aging heroes including Phwombly in an action similar to the gunfight at the OK Corral.

Two years later, Greatheart (named for the character in Pilgrim's Progress) is disguised as an employee of Acme W-W Cleaners and narrowly avoids averting a kidnapping. The victim of the terrorist group turns out to be Micawber's estranged daughter, Jill Micawber, who went under an assumed name so she would not be associated with her ruthless father. Greatheart traces the kidnappers, despite the efforts of Micawber to trail him, to the Fokker D-LXIX Press building, specializers in erotica owned by Acme Zeppelin.

Using a DRECC computer, executive Rade Starling can transform any printed work into a sensually appealing one (e.g. Glinda of Oz becomes The Secret Life of Glinda of Oz, or The Good Witch Goes Bad) and after knocking Greatheart out reveals his plan, with a microchip embedded in the books' front covers, to overwhelm readers' emotions and make them euphoric and suggestible. With the help of Jill, a previous acquaintance of his from UCLA, Greatheart enables Starling's project to overwhelm him and his associates. Since the project was conducted on Acme-owned property, Greatheart has sufficient blackmail on Micawber to prevent his harassing him again.

With Jill's leverage, Greatheart marries her and (with Micawber's grudging blessing) becomes captain of Acme Zeppelin 49. On a trans-Pacific journey to Minerva with a cargo of iridium and platinum, another group of kidnappers attempts to abduct Jill and encounters a Brittany separatist group on board. When gunshots go off and penetrate the airbag as well as short out the computers on the bridge, the groups must work together to reach land.
