= Vincent Deporter =

Belgian artist (1959–2022)

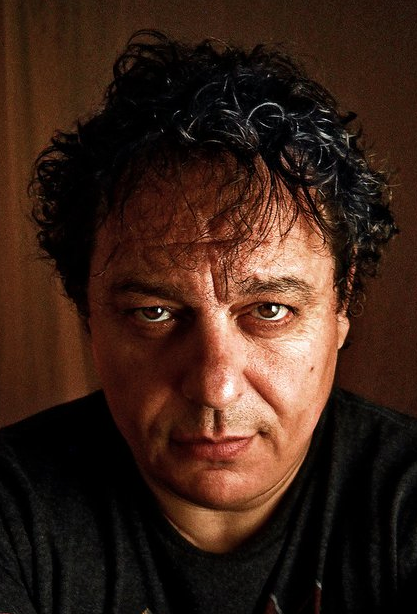
- Deporter in 2010
- Born: 13 February 1959 Nivelles, Belgium
- Died: 25 September 2022 (aged 63)
- Areas: Comic books, storyboard artist
- Pseudonyms: Deporter, Mike Deporter
- Notable works: Crazy Planet; Les Fourmidables; Roméo

Vincent Deporter (13 February 1959 – 25 September 2022) was a Belgian comic and storyboard artist. Deporter got his start in comics working as an assistant to Jean Graton, before selling his own strips, as Mike Deporter, to Spirou magazine. From 1996, after relocating to New York, he worked on DC's line of comic books adapted from popular animated cartoons, like Scooby-Doo and Ed, Edd n Eddy, and also inked many of the Batman and Superman style-guides. He continued to work for Nickelodeon, notably on SpongeBob SquarePants. When Nickelodeon Magazine ended its print run, he then started to write and draw for the SpongeBob Comics as a regular contributor. Deporter also wrote and illustrated on more philosophical issues. He illustrated the book Sacred Cows: a Lighthearted Look at Belief and Tradition around the World, by the host of The Thinking Atheist Seth Andrews. He lived in Arizona, painting and writing non-graphic novels.

== Bibliography ==
Comic work includes:

- Roméo (with Philippe Rive, Glénat, 1994, ISBN 978-2-7234-1698-6)
- Mimi Siku (with Hervé Palud, Glénat, 1994, ISBN 978-2-7234-1831-7)
- The Big Book of (Paradox Press):
  - Weird Wild West: How the West Was Really Won! (1998, ISBN W1563893614)
  - Grimm: Truly Scary Fairy Tales to Frighten the Whole Family (2000, ISBN 1-56389-501-3)
  - Bad: The Best of the Worst of Everything (2001, ISBN 1-56389-359-2)
  - Vice (2001, ISBN 1-56389-454-8)
- Les Fourmidables (Bamboo)
  - Des fourmis dans les jambes (2003, ISBN 2-912715-63-6)
  - Cirques divers (2004, ISBN 2-915309-05-1)
- Cartoon Cartoons:
  - Name That Toon! (tpb collecting Dexter's Laboratory #1 & 4, Cartoon Cartoons #1-4 and Cartoon Network Starring #2, 2004, ISBN 1-4012-0181-4)
  - The Gangs All Here (tpb collecting Dexter's Laboratory #5-6, Cartoon Cartoons #5 & 7 and Cartoon Network Starring #7)
- Scooby-Doo:
  - Vol. 5. Surf's Up (written by Chris Duffy, Joe Edkin and Terrance Griep, DC Comics, 2006, ISBN 1-4012-0936-X)
  - Vol. 6. Space Fright (written by Chris Duffy, Joe Edkin and Terrance Griep, DC Comics, 2006, ISBN 1-4012-0937-8)
- SpongeBob SquarePants:
  - "Best in Show (Nick Zone) " (written by Tracey West, ISBN 0-439-56278-3)
  - "Beyond Bikini Bottom! " (written by Sonali Fry, ISBN 0-689-87738-2)
  - "Special Delivery!" (written by Steven Banks, ISBN 0-689-85887-6)
  - "Stop the Presses!" (written by Steven Banks, ISBN 0689877269)
  - "The Song That Never Ends" (written by Steven Banks, ISBN 1-59961-446-4)
  - "The Three Little Neighbors" (written by David Lewman, Gene Vosough, ISBN 1-4169-0688-6)
  - "SpongeBob SquarePants Phonics Box" (written by Sonia Sander, ISBN 0-439-77948-0)
  - "Hoedown Showdown" (written by Kelli Chipponeri, also illustrated by Barry Goldberg, ISBN 1-4169-0689-4)
