= Breathtaker =

- Breathtaker #1 (1990), art by Marc Hempel.

Publication information
- Publisher: DC Comics
- Format: Limited series
- Publication date: 1990
- No. of issues: 4

Creative team
- Written by: Mark Wheatley
- Artist(s): Marc Hempel

Breathtaker is a comic book four-part limited series published by DC Comics in 1990, with a collected edition published in 1994 under the Vertigo imprint. It was written by Mark Wheatley and drawn by Marc Hempel. In the 2010s Wheatley and Hempel started work on a "remastered" version, reaching out to fans on the crowdfunding site IndieGogo.

== Premise ==
Due to government experiments, the beautiful girl Chase Darrow is addicted to finding true love. She is incredibly dynamic, with all sorts of men falling for her. The problem is, loving her means death. Her lovers literally age and die, though happy and blissful. Chase is traumatized by this but it is hard to fight her addiction. Chase comes to the attention of the world's first actual super-human, called The Man.
