= Fiction Illustrated =

Series of early illustrated fiction

Fiction Illustrated is a short-lived series of early illustrated fiction, similar to graphic novels, produced and packaged by Byron Preiss Visual Productions in the 1970s and published by Pyramid/Jove/HBJ. Four were produced, with a fifth was planned. All but one were written by Byron Preiss. The first three were published digest size, the fourth was published in larger format.

== Volumes ==
- Fiction Illustrated #1—Schlomo Raven: Public Detective (Pyramid Books, 1976; by Preiss and Tom Sutton)
- Fiction Illustrated #2—Starfawn (Pyramid Books, 1976; by Preiss and Stephen Fabian)
- Fiction Illustrated #3—Chandler: Red Tide (Pyramid Books, 1976 ISBN 0-515-04241-2; Dark Horse Comics, 2001 ISBN 1-56971-438-X)
- Fiction Illustrated #4—Son of Sherlock Holmes (Pyramid Books, 1977; by Preiss and Ralph Reese)

== Follow-ons ==
- Dragonworld (planned to be the fifth volume), Preiss and Michael Reaves, illustrated by Joseph Zucker.
  - Doubleday hardcover, 1979
  - Bantam / Dell paperback, 1979) ISBN 0-553-01077-8
  - Spectra paperback (July 1983) ISBN 0-553-25857-5
  - Bantam / Dell paperback (Aug. 1983) ISBN 0-553-23426-9
  - iBooks, Inc. paperback (2000) ISBN 0-671-03907-5
  - iBooks, Inc. ebook (Microsoft Reader; 2001)
  - iBooks, Inc. paperback (2002) ISBN 0-7434-5253-4
  - iBooks, Inc. paperback (2005) ISBN 1-59687-233-0
- Alfred Bester's The Stars My Destination as a planned two-volume graphic novel, illustrated by Howard Chaykin, Putnam/Berkley, 1978. Volume two never published, Complete published by Epic Comics, xx.
- Samuel R. Delany's Empire, illustrated by Howard Chaykin, Putnam/Berkley, 1978. ISBN 0-399-12245-1/ISBN 0-425-03900-5
- The Illustrated Roger Zelazny, illustrated by Gray Morrow, Baronet, 1978, Ace Books, 1979. ISBN 0-89437-014-6
