= Arthur Byron Cover =

American science fiction author

- Born: January 14, 1950 (age 76) Grundy, Virginia, U.S.
- Occupation: Author
- Education: Clarion Workshop
- Genre: Science fiction

Arthur Byron Cover (born January 14, 1950, in Grundy, Virginia) is an American science fiction author.

Cover attended the Clarion Writer's SF Workshop in New Orleans in 1971, and made his first professional short-story sale to Harlan Ellison's The Last Dangerous Visions.

Cover's short stories have appeared in Infinity Five, Alternities, The Alien Condition, Weird Heroes #6, The Year's Best Horror #4 and #5, Wild Cards #5: Down & Dirty, and Pulphouse. He has also written several comic books, including two issues of Daredevil (one of them with Ellison), and Space Clusters, a graphic novel from DC Comics illustrated by Alex Niño — plus several animation scripts, and reviews and articles for such august publications as The New York Review of Science Fiction.

Cover's first novel, Autumn Angels, was the second of Harlan Ellison's Discovery Series of new authors for Pyramid Books, and was nominated for a Nebula Award. The novel has been described as "a stylistic cross-breed of Ellison and Vonnegut, and as such both predates and bests Douglas Adams in creating a comic, literary fantasy."

== Bibliography ==
=== Buffyverse ===
- Night of the Living Rerun (1998)

=== Other works ===
- Autumn Angels (1975)
- The Platypus of Doom and Other Nihilists (1976; a collection of 4 novelettes)
  - "The Platypus of Doom"
  - "The Armadillo of Destruction"
  - "The Aardvark of Despair"
  - "The Clam of Catastrophe"
- The Sound of Winter (Pyramid Books, 1976)
- An East Wind Coming (1979)
- Flash Gordon (1980; novelization of the screenplay by Michael Allin and Lorenzo Semple Jr.)
- Time Machine
  - The Rings of Saturn (No. 6)
  - American Revolutionary (No. 10)
  - Blade of the Guillotine (No. 14, 1986)
- Space Clusters (1986)
- Planetfall (1988)
- Isaac Asimov's Robot City: Prodigy (#4, 1988)
- Stationfall (1989)
- The Rising Stars Trilogy (2002–2005; based on the comic book series by J. Michael Straczynski)
  - "Rising Stars Book 1: Born In Fire" (2002)
  - "Rising Stars Book 2: Ten Years After" (2002)
  - "Rising Stars Book 3: Change the World" (2005)
- The Red Star (2003)
- Brainticket: Three Novellas of Science Fiction (2020)
- The Quantum Pirate & The 7 Rules of Life (2023)

== Television credits ==
- The Transformers (1986)
- Defenders of the Earth (1986)
- Bionic Six (1987)
- Spiral Zone (1987)
- Dinosaucers (1987)
- Starcom: The U.S. Space Force (1987)
- The Real Ghostbusters (1987)
- Transformers: Generation 2 (1993)
- Phantom 2040 (1995)
