= Mars (comics) =

- Cover of IDW Trade Paperback
- Author: Mark Wheatley & Marc Hempel
- Genre: Science Fiction
- Publisher: First Comics; IDW Publishing
- Publication date: 2005
- ISBN: 978-1-932382-90-7 (Softcover); ISBN 978-1-932382-91-4 (Hardcover)
- OCLC: 58828104

Mars is a 1984 American comic book series published by First Comics that ran for 12 issues. Inspired by the pulp science fiction stories of the 1930s and 1940s, creators Mark Wheatley and Marc Hempel collaborated on the story featuring a group of explorers and engineers sent to Mars with the goal of terraforming the red planet. When all communication with earth is lost, the team of terraformers must make a decision that will not only forever change their lives but perhaps the future of the human race.

The complete series was collected and released by IDW Publishing in 2005 as both a 288-page trade paperback and limited edition hardcover; this release featured a new cover by Wheatley and Hempel, digitally recolored interior art, and 32 pages of supplemental material detailing the history of the project.

== External links and sources ==
- Wheatley & Hempel interview re: 2005 collected edition
- IDW Homepage
- Insight Studio's Mars page
