= SpongeBob Comics =

Comic series based on SpongeBob SquarePants

SpongeBob Comics (series)
- Cover for SpongeBob Comics #1. Art by Sherm Cohen.

Publication information
- Publisher: United Plankton/Bongo Comics
- Schedule: Monthly
- Format: Ongoing series
- Genre: Humor/comedy
- Publication date: February 2011 — October 2018
- No. of issues: 85
- Main character: SpongeBob SquarePants
- ISSN: 2158-253X

Creative team
- Created by: Stephen Hillenburg
- Written by: Various
- Artist: Various
- Penciller: Various
- Letterer(s): Comicraft; Rob Leigh
- Colorist: Various
- Editor: Chris Duffy

SpongeBob Comics is an American comic book series based on the animated television series SpongeBob SquarePants. It was published by series creator Stephen Hillenburg's company United Plankton Pictures and distributed by Bongo Comics. Issues were initially released every two months beginning in February 2011 and were released monthly from June 2012 to October 2018.

Following the launch of the SpongeBob SquarePants television series in 1999, Nickelodeon Magazine regularly included in its issues numerous comic stories from the series' universe. In November 2010, Hillenburg announced the upcoming release of a comic book series entirely dedicated to SpongeBob SquarePants which launched the following year. Several independent comic creators contributed to the comic throughout its run including SpongeBob veteran Derek Drymon.

In 2018, the series went on a publication hiatus after issue #85 due to Bongo Comics shutting down in October. Hillenburg died a month later, making a continuation of the series very uncertain.

== Publication history ==
Originally, Stephen Hillenburg authored an educational comic book in the 1980s, called The Intertidal Zone, while he worked as a teacher of marine science at the Ocean Institute in Dana Point, California. This comic book depicted ocean life through anthropomorphic sea creatures, as the character of Bob the Sponge, a natural sponge with sunglasses who would become the first prototype of SpongeBob SquarePants. The universe of the SpongeBob SquarePants series is therefore directly inspired by The Intertidal Zone.

Following the launch of the SpongeBob SquarePants television series in 1999, Nickelodeon Magazine regularly published in its issues numerous comic stories from the series' universe. In November 2010, United Plankton Pictures, Hillenburg's company and production company on the television series, announced the upcoming release of a comic book series entirely dedicated to SpongeBob SquarePants and supporting characters in association with Bongo Comics Group, a comic book publishing company founded in 1993 by The Simpsons and Futurama creator, Matt Groening.

Debuting in February 2011, the series was published under the name of SpongeBob Comics, and was originally intended to be bimonthly, before becoming monthly from June 2012. Along with Hillenburg, independent comic creators who contributed to the first issue include James Kochalka, Hilary Barta, Graham Annable, Gregg Schigiel, and Jacob Chabot. Issue number 13, a Halloween special, was released in October 2012 featuring the work of such writers and artists as Stephen R. Bissette, Tony Millionaire, Al Jaffee, and Derek Drymon. Another Halloween-themed issue was released the following year featuring cartoonist Michael T. Gilbert.

In June 2013, United Plankton released SpongeBob Annual-Size Super-Giant Swimtacular #1. Managing editor Chris Duffy said the annual was "specially tailored" for superhero fans, with a cover by artist Jacob Chabot that was influenced by the Marvel Comics annuals of the 1960s. Collaborators for the book included Drymon, Kochalka, Barta, Ramona Fradon, Chuck Dixon, Jerry Ordway, and Vincent Deporter. A second superhero-inspired annual was released in June 2014.

In 2018, the series went on a publication hiatus after issue #85 due to Bongo Comics Group shutting down in October. Stephen Hillenburg died a month later, making a continuation of the series very uncertain.

== Reception ==
In a review of the premiere issue, Chad Nevett of Comic Book Resources wrote: "SpongeBob Comics is effective at capturing the tone of the show and allowing the creators to present their own takes on the characters at times. It suffers sometimes from not being able to rely on the strengths of animation and, hopefully, will take advantage of the things that comics can do that animation can't."

Brigid Alverson of Comic Book Resources described SpongeBob Annual-Size Super-Giant Swimtacular #1 as "48 pages of pure summer vacation fun that is goofy enough to be fun for kids and smart enough to entertain adults as well." Writing for School Library Journal, J. Caleb Mozzocco said that although the longer page-count and higher price tag of the SpongeBob annual might make it a "less-than-ideal" jumping-on point, he added that "the superhero parody content ironically makes it an even easier comic for comics readers with no experience with the cartoon to enjoy."

== Issues ==
| Issues | Release date | Caption | Title | Story | Art | Colors | Lettering |
|---|---|---|---|---|---|---|---|
| 1 | February 9, 2011 | POROUS PREMIERE ISSUE | Waking Up Is Hard to Do | Graham Annable | Pencils: Gregg Schigiel; Inks: Adam DeKraker | Rick Nielsen | Comicraft |
| 1 | February 9, 2011 | POROUS PREMIERE ISSUE | Stylin' Sponge | Chris Duffy | Andy Rementer | | Comicraft |
| 1 | February 9, 2011 | POROUS PREMIERE ISSUE | Mermaid Man and Barnacle Boy vs. the Octopus King | James Kochalka | Hilary Barta | Rick Nielsen | Comicraft |
| 1 | February 9, 2011 | POROUS PREMIERE ISSUE | GlowSponge | Bob Flynn | | | Comicraft |
| 1 | February 9, 2011 | POROUS PREMIERE ISSUE | They're Playing My Tune | David Lewman | Jacob Chabot | Mark Martin | Comicraft |
| 1 | February 9, 2011 | POROUS PREMIERE ISSUE | Best Joke Ever | Robert Leighton | Vince Deporter | Wes Dzioba | Comicraft |
| 1 | February 9, 2011 | POROUS PREMIERE ISSUE | Midnight Snack Attack | Corey Barba | | Wes Dzioba | Comicraft |
| 1 | February 9, 2011 | POROUS PREMIERE ISSUE | SpongeFunnies | James Kochalka | | | Comicraft |
| 2 | April 13, 2011 | CAUTION: STUDENT BOATER! | Picture It! | Derek Drymon | Gregg Schigiel | Molly Dolben | Comicraft |
| 2 | April 13, 2011 | CAUTION: STUDENT BOATER! | Split Decision | Robert Leighton | Jacob Chabot | Mark Martin | Comicraft |
| 2 | April 13, 2011 | CAUTION: STUDENT BOATER! | Star Studded Cast | Chris Duffy | Andy Rementer | | Comicraft |
| 2 | April 13, 2011 | CAUTION: STUDENT BOATER! | All Wrapped Up | Scott Roberts | Gregg Schigiel | Rick Nielsen | Comicraft |
| 2 | April 13, 2011 | CAUTION: STUDENT BOATER! | A Swell Time | Bob Flynn | | | Comicraft |
| 2 | April 13, 2011 | CAUTION: STUDENT BOATER! | SpongeFunnies | James Kochalka | | | Comicraft |
| 2 | April 13, 2011 | CAUTION: STUDENT BOATER! | Grandma's Cookies | Bob Flynn | | | Comicraft |
| 3 | June 8, 2011 | HE'S GOT ISSUES! | Squidward and the Golden Clarinet | Derek Drymon | Gregg Schigiel, Ramona Fradon | Mark Martin | Comicraft, Rick Parker |
| 3 | June 8, 2011 | HE'S GOT ISSUES! | A Peek Inside the Mind of Patrick | Robert Leighton | Vince Deporter | Ellen Everett | Vince Deporter |
| 3 | June 8, 2011 | HE'S GOT ISSUES! | Weird Beard | Chris Duffy | Andy Rementer | | Comicraft |
| 3 | June 8, 2011 | HE'S GOT ISSUES! | Krabby Gary | David Lewman | Jacob Chabot | Rick Nielsen | Comicraft |
| 3 | June 8, 2011 | HE'S GOT ISSUES! | SpongeFunnies | James Kochalka | | | Comicraft |
| 3 | June 8, 2011 | HE'S GOT ISSUES! | Dial 'S' for Willie | Jacob Lambert | Vince Deporter | Ellen Everett | Comicraft |
| 3 | June 8, 2011 | HE'S GOT ISSUES! | One Afternoon in Spring | Graham Annable | | Mark Martin | Comicraft |
| 4 | August 10, 2011 | BEWARE... THE DISHWASHER! | The Replacement | Graham Annable | Pencils: Gregg Schigiel; Inks: Adam DeKraker | Molly Dolben | Comicraft |
| 4 | August 10, 2011 | BEWARE... THE DISHWASHER! | Look, Squidward, I Bought You a Special Surprise! | Dave Roman | Andy Rementer | | Comicraft |
| 4 | August 10, 2011 | BEWARE... THE DISHWASHER! | Burn It | Brian Smith | Pencils: Gregg Schigiel; Inks: Adam DeKraker | Ellen Everett | Comicraft |
| 4 | August 10, 2011 | BEWARE... THE DISHWASHER! | SpongeFunnies | James Kochalka | | | Comicraft |
| 4 | August 10, 2011 | BEWARE... THE DISHWASHER! | SpongeBob! Wait!!! | Joey Weiser | Stephen DeStefano | | Comicraft |
| 4 | August 10, 2011 | BEWARE... THE DISHWASHER! | Mental Delivery | Scott Roberts | Vince Deporter | Rick Nielsen | Comicraft |
| 4 | August 10, 2011 | BEWARE... THE DISHWASHER! | Patrick's Big Secret | Corey Barba | Vince Deporter | Mark Martin | Comicraft |
| 4 | August 10, 2011 | BEWARE... THE DISHWASHER! | A Plankton Family Tree | Corey Barba | | Rick Nielsen | Comicraft |
| 4 | August 10, 2011 | BEWARE... THE DISHWASHER! | SpongeBob and Patrick Make a Funny Face | Sam Henderson | | | |
| 5 | October 12, 2011 | ANOTHER WORK OF ART FROM | Day Off / Off Day | Derek Drymon | Gregg Schigiel | Rick Nielsen | Comicraft |
| 5 | October 12, 2011 | ANOTHER WORK OF ART FROM | Let 'Er Rip | Jacob Lambert | Vince Deporter | Ellen Everett | Comicraft |
| 5 | October 12, 2011 | ANOTHER WORK OF ART FROM | Flotsam & Jetsam: The Aquatic Sponge | Chris Duffy | Nate Neal | | Comicraft |
| 5 | October 12, 2011 | ANOTHER WORK OF ART FROM | Let's Go to the Vet's Office | Dave Roman | Andy Rementer | | Comicraft |
| 5 | October 12, 2011 | ANOTHER WORK OF ART FROM | Truckin'! | Chuck Dixon | Stephen DeStefano | Mark Martin | Comicraft |
| 5 | October 12, 2011 | ANOTHER WORK OF ART FROM | Squidward's Nightmare | Robert Leighton | Jacob Chabot | Molly Dolben | Comicraft |
| 5 | October 12, 2011 | ANOTHER WORK OF ART FROM | SpongeFunnies | James Kochalka | | | Comicraft |
| 5 | October 12, 2011 | ANOTHER WORK OF ART FROM | Face 2 Face | Joey Weiser | Richard Thompson | | Comicraft |
| 6 | December 14, 2011 | CRISIS OF INFINITE JERKS! | Bikini Bottom 2 | Dani Michaeli | Jacob Chabot | Rick Nielsen | Comicraft |
| 6 | December 14, 2011 | CRISIS OF INFINITE JERKS! | Scared Square | Casey Alexander | Vince Deporter | Monica Kubina | Comicraft |
| 6 | December 14, 2011 | CRISIS OF INFINITE JERKS! | SpongeFunnies | James Kochalka | | | Comicraft |
| 6 | December 14, 2011 | CRISIS OF INFINITE JERKS! | Where's Penny? | Robert Leighton | Gregg Schigiel | Monica Kubina | Comicraft |
| 6 | December 14, 2011 | CRISIS OF INFINITE JERKS! | Squidward Saves Television | Gregg Schigiel | | Molly Dolben | Comicraft |
| 6 | December 14, 2011 | CRISIS OF INFINITE JERKS! | Mr. Krabs' Pool Party | Dave Roman | Andy Rementer | | Comicraft |
| 6 | December 14, 2011 | CRISIS OF INFINITE JERKS! | SpongeBob CargoPants | Corey Barba | Julie Wilson | | Comicraft |
| 7 | February 8, 2012 | THE SAVAGE SPATULA OF | Missing Man! | David Lewman | Jacob Chabot | Molly Dolben | Comicraft |
| 7 | February 8, 2012 | THE SAVAGE SPATULA OF | Gary's Hairball Adventure | James Kochalka | | | Comicraft |
| 7 | February 8, 2012 | THE SAVAGE SPATULA OF | Look Out Below! | Graham Annable | | Molly Dolben | Comicraft |
| 7 | February 8, 2012 | THE SAVAGE SPATULA OF | Flotsam and Jetsam Ocean Facts: Sea Stars | Julie Winterbottom | Nate Neal | | Comicraft |
| 7 | February 8, 2012 | THE SAVAGE SPATULA OF | Egg Hunt | Joey Weiser | Vince Deporter | Monica Kubina | Comicraft |
| 7 | February 8, 2012 | THE SAVAGE SPATULA OF | SpongeFunnies | James Kochalka | | | Comicraft |
| 7 | February 8, 2012 | THE SAVAGE SPATULA OF | Krabby Klub | Scott Shaw | Jacob Chabot | Monica Kubina | Comicraft |
| 8 | April 11, 2012 | DUMBIN' RIGHT AT YA! | Slip-Sledding Away | Graham Annable | | Rick Nielsen | Comicraft |
| 8 | April 11, 2012 | DUMBIN' RIGHT AT YA! | The Tooth Shall Set You Free | Corey Barba | Jacob Chabot | Mike DeVito | Comicraft |
| 8 | April 11, 2012 | DUMBIN' RIGHT AT YA! | SpongeFunnies | James Kochalka | | | Comicraft |
| 8 | April 11, 2012 | DUMBIN' RIGHT AT YA! | Jam Session | Bob Flynn | | | |
| 8 | April 11, 2012 | DUMBIN' RIGHT AT YA! | Formula for Success | Scott Roberts | Vince Deporter | Rick Nielsen | Comicraft |
| 8 | April 11, 2012 | DUMBIN' RIGHT AT YA! | Design Mrs. Puff's Dream Boat | Dave Roman | Andy Rementer | | Comicraft |
| 8 | April 11, 2012 | DUMBIN' RIGHT AT YA! | Sandy's New Invention | David DeGrand | | | Comicraft |
| 9 | June 13, 2012 | | Calls in the Wild | Graham Annable | Pencils: Gregg Schigiel; Inks: Adam DeKraker | Monica Kubina | Comicraft |
| 9 | June 13, 2012 | | The Big Breakout | Vince Deporter | | Ellen Everett | Comicraft |
| 9 | June 13, 2012 | | Sock It to Me (Part 1) | Joey Weiser | Graham Annable | | Comicraft |
| 9 | June 13, 2012 | | PatStar NoPants | Corey Barba | Vince Deporter | Mike LaPinski | Comicraft |
| 9 | June 13, 2012 | | Sock It to Me (Part 2) | Joey Weiser | Graham Annable | | Comicraft |
| 9 | June 13, 2012 | | Heroes at the Beach | David Lewman | Vince Deporter | Molly Dolben | Comicraft |
| 9 | June 13, 2012 | | Sock It to Me (Part 3) | Joey Weiser | Graham Annable | | Comicraft |
| 9 | June 13, 2012 | | Flotsam and Jetsam Ocean Facts: Cephalopods | Maris Wicks | Nate Neal | | Comicraft |
| 9 | June 13, 2012 | | SpongeFunnies | James Kochalka | | | Comicraft |
| 10 | July 11, 2012 | SAFE-CRACKING UP! | The Housesitter | Scott Roberts | Gregg Schigiel | Michael Lapinski | Comicraft |
| 10 | July 11, 2012 | SAFE-CRACKING UP! | Cleaning Up | Dave Roman | Andy Rementer | | Comicraft |
| 10 | July 11, 2012 | SAFE-CRACKING UP! | Mermaid-Man and Barnacle Boy in Raising the Curtain of Evil! | Robert Leighton | Mark Martin | | |
| 10 | July 11, 2012 | SAFE-CRACKING UP! | Mermaid-Man and Barnacle Boy vs. Plankton! | James Kochalka | Hilary Barta | Rick Neilsen | Comicraft |
| 10 | July 11, 2012 | SAFE-CRACKING UP! | SpongeBob is The Key | Jacob Lambert | Vince Deporter | Monica Kubina | Comicraft |
| 10 | July 11, 2012 | SAFE-CRACKING UP! | SpongeBob Finds A Cave | James Kochalka | | | Comicraft |
| 10 | July 11, 2012 | SAFE-CRACKING UP! | Hold Still! | Jay Lender | | Rick Neilsen | Comicraft |
| 11 | August 8, 2012 | MORE SWEET STORIES! | | | | | |
| 12 | September 12, 2012 | WELL DONE, SQUIDWARD! | Great Grandma | David Lewman | Jacob Chabot | Richard Nielsen | Comicraft |
| 12 | September 12, 2012 | WELL DONE, SQUIDWARD! | Yacht to Know | Sam Henderson | Derek Drymon/Stephen DeStefano | Scott Roberts | Comicraft |
| 12 | September 12, 2012 | WELL DONE, SQUIDWARD! | Too Tough! | David Lewman | Jacob Chabot | Mike Devito | Comicraft |
| 12 | September 12, 2012 | WELL DONE, SQUIDWARD! | SpongeFunnies | James Kochalka | | | Comicraft |
| 12 | September 12, 2012 | WELL DONE, SQUIDWARD! | Bossin' & Flossin' | Jacob Lambert | Vince Deporter | Monica Kubina | Comicraft |
| 12 | September 12, 2012 | WELL DONE, SQUIDWARD! | Flotsam and Jetsam Ocean Facts: Crabs | Maris Wicks | Nate Neal | | Comicraft |
| 13 | October 10, 2012 | HAUNTED 13TH ISSUE! | The Taste of FEAR! | David Lewman | Vince Deporter | Molly Dolben | Comicraft |
| 13 | October 10, 2012 | HAUNTED 13TH ISSUE! | Flotsam and Jetsam Ocean Facts: Anglers | Maris Wicks | Nate Neal | | Comicraft |
| 13 | October 10, 2012 | HAUNTED 13TH ISSUE! | SpongeFunnies | James Kochalka | | | Comicraft |
| 13 | October 10, 2012 | HAUNTED 13TH ISSUE! | Drawn In! | Derek Drymon | Derek Drymon/Stephen R. Bissette | Cat Garza/Monica Kubina | Comicraft |
| 13 | October 10, 2012 | HAUNTED 13TH ISSUE! | Broken Mirror | Dave Roman | Andy Rementer | | Comicraft |
| 13 | October 10, 2012 | HAUNTED 13TH ISSUE! | The Curse of the Flying Dutchman | Derek Drymon | Tony Millionaire | James Campbell | Tony Millionaire |
| 13 | October 10, 2012 | HAUNTED 13TH ISSUE! | Clues for the Clueless | Robert Leighton | Jacob Chabot | Hifi | Comicraft |
| 13 | October 10, 2012 | HAUNTED 13TH ISSUE! | Dream Big! | Chris Yambar | Al Jaffee | | Comicraft |
| 14 | November 14, 2012 | NOW UNDER NEW MANAGEMENT! | Dream a Patty Dream | Chuck Dixon | Jacob Chabot | Hifi | Comicraft |
| 14 | November 14, 2012 | NOW UNDER NEW MANAGEMENT! | One Night at the Chum Bucket | Jacob Lambert | Hilary Barta | Rick Neilsen | Comicraft |
| 14 | November 14, 2012 | NOW UNDER NEW MANAGEMENT! | SpongeFunnies | James Kochalka | | | Comicraft |
| 14 | November 14, 2012 | NOW UNDER NEW MANAGEMENT! | For the Love of Chum | Derek Drymon | Gregg Schigiel | Molly Dolben | Comicraft |
| 14 | November 14, 2012 | NOW UNDER NEW MANAGEMENT! | The Enemy Within! | Robert Leighton | Jacob Chabot | Monica Kubina | Comicraft |
| 14 | November 14, 2012 | NOW UNDER NEW MANAGEMENT! | Flotsam and Jetsam Ocean Facts: Plankton | Maris Wicks | Nate Neal | | Comicraft |
| 14 | November 14, 2012 | NOW UNDER NEW MANAGEMENT! | Plankton's Last Laff | Joey Weiser | Vanessa Davis | | |
| 15 | December 12, 2012 | A STAR IS BURNED! | Pat the Temp | Scott Roberts | Gregg Schigiel | Hifi | Comicraft |
| 15 | December 12, 2012 | A STAR IS BURNED! | Snails & Tiaras | David DeGrand | | | Comicraft |
| 15 | December 12, 2012 | A STAR IS BURNED! | Jellyfish Fashion Week! | Dave Roman | Andy Rementer | | Comicraft |
| 15 | December 12, 2012 | A STAR IS BURNED! | Trash Stalkin' | David Lewman | Vince Deporter | Monica Kubina | Comicraft |
| 15 | December 12, 2012 | A STAR IS BURNED! | TRANSFORM!!! | Joey Weiser | Stephen DeStefano | Monica Kubina | Comicraft |
| 15 | December 12, 2012 | A STAR IS BURNED! | SpongeFunnies | James Kochalka | | | Comicraft |
| 15 | December 12, 2012 | A STAR IS BURNED! | Connect the Dots | Derek Drymon | | Mark Martin | Comicraft |
| 16 | January 9, 2013 | | The Treasure of Captain Goldfish | Derek Drymon | Jacob Chabot | Rick Neilsen | Comicraft |
| 16 | January 9, 2013 | | Flotsam and Jetsam Ocean Facts: Sea Turtles | Maris Wicks | | | Comicraft |
| 16 | January 9, 2013 | | The Big Bubble Trip | Jacob Lambert | Stephanie Gladden | Molly Dolben | Comicraft |
| 16 | January 9, 2013 | | Fate's Frigid Patty | Corey Barba | | | Comicraft |
| 16 | January 9, 2013 | | SpongeFunnies | James Kochalka | | | Comicraft |
| 16 | January 9, 2013 | | Adventure! | Israel Sanchez | | | |
| 17 | February 13, 2013 | THE MAGAZINE FOR POROUS PUSHOVERS! | Trading Laces! A Knotty Adventure | Robert Leighton | Gregg Schigiel | Hifi | Comicraft |
| 17 | February 13, 2013 | THE MAGAZINE FOR POROUS PUSHOVERS! | Secret Tunnel? | Dave Roman | | | Comicraft |
| 17 | February 13, 2013 | THE MAGAZINE FOR POROUS PUSHOVERS! | Filthy Habit | Corey Barba | Vince Deporter | Molly Dolben | Comicraft |
| 17 | February 13, 2013 | THE MAGAZINE FOR POROUS PUSHOVERS! | What Lurks Inside the Jelly Hive? | Bob Flynn | | | Comicraft |
| 17 | February 13, 2013 | THE MAGAZINE FOR POROUS PUSHOVERS! | SpongeFunnies | James Kochalka | | | Comicraft |
| 17 | February 13, 2013 | THE MAGAZINE FOR POROUS PUSHOVERS! | Dye-ing For the Part | David DeGrand | | | Comicraft |
| 18 | March 13, 2013 | | Driving Dutchman | David Lewman | Vince Deporter | Hifi | Comicraft |
| 18 | March 13, 2013 | | Flotsam & Jetsam: Sea Snails | Maris Wicks | | | Comicraft |
| 18 | March 13, 2013 | | Eye Drop | Dani Michaeli | Chris Eliopoulos | | Comicraft |
| 18 | March 13, 2013 | | SpongeFunnies | James Kochalka | | | Comicraft |
| 18 | March 13, 2013 | | New Guy | Corey Barba | Gregg Schigiel | Michael DeVito | Comicraft |
| 18 | March 13, 2013 | | The Legend of the Novella Graphica | Jacob Lambert | Ramona Fradon | Jim Campbell | Comicraft |
| 19 | April 10, 2013 | THE SEARCH FOR SQUIDWARD! | Farewell, Squidward! | Dani Michaeli | Vince Deporter | Hifi | Comicraft |
| 19 | April 10, 2013 | THE SEARCH FOR SQUIDWARD! | Welcome to the Annual ___ | Dave Roman | Travis Nichols | | Comicraft |
| 19 | April 10, 2013 | THE SEARCH FOR SQUIDWARD! | SpongeFunnies | James Kochalka | | | Comicraft |
| 19 | April 10, 2013 | THE SEARCH FOR SQUIDWARD! | Clean Up in Aisle 10 | Joey Weiser | | | Comicraft |
| 19 | April 10, 2013 | THE SEARCH FOR SQUIDWARD! | Monstah Lobstah Cometh! | Chuck Dixon | Hilary Barta | Monica Kubina | Comicraft |
| 19 | April 10, 2013 | THE SEARCH FOR SQUIDWARD! | Locked Out | David DeGrand | | | Comicraft |
| 19 | April 10, 2013 | THE SEARCH FOR SQUIDWARD! | Morning Melody | Derek Drymon | | Monica Kubina | Comicraft |
| 20 | May 8, 2013 | LORD OF THE KELP FOREST! | Sponge Monkey | Derek Drymon | Gregg Schigiel | Monica Kubina | Comicraft |
| 20 | May 8, 2013 | LORD OF THE KELP FOREST! | Flotsam & Jetsam: Lobsters! | Maris Wicks | | | Comicraft |
| 20 | May 8, 2013 | LORD OF THE KELP FOREST! | SpongeFunnies | James Kochalka | | | Comicraft |
| 20 | May 8, 2013 | LORD OF THE KELP FOREST! | Robocritic | Jacob Lambert | Stephanie Gladden | Molly Dolben | Comicraft |
| 20 | May 8, 2013 | LORD OF THE KELP FOREST! | Tiny Tales | Karen Sneider | Nate Neal | | Comicraft |
| 20 | May 8, 2013 | LORD OF THE KELP FOREST! | Friend Fair! | David Lewman | Graham Annable | Hifi | Comicraft |
| 21 | June 12, 2013 | THE KRUSTY KRAB--NABBED! | The Krusty Nabbed! | David Lewman | Jacob Chabot | Mike Lapinski | Comicraft |
| 21 | June 12, 2013 | THE KRUSTY KRAB--NABBED! | SILENCE! | Dani Michaeli | Stephanie Gladden | Monica Kubina | Comicraft |
| 21 | June 12, 2013 | THE KRUSTY KRAB--NABBED! | Love at First Meow | Joey Weiser | Nate Neal | | |
| 21 | June 12, 2013 | THE KRUSTY KRAB--NABBED! | Brine Dancin' | Travis Nichols | | | Comicraft |
| 21 | June 12, 2013 | THE KRUSTY KRAB--NABBED! | Eye of the Beholder | David McGuire | | | Comicraft |
| 21 | June 12, 2013 | THE KRUSTY KRAB--NABBED! | SpongeFunnies | James Kochalka | | | Comicraft |
| 21 | June 12, 2013 | THE KRUSTY KRAB--NABBED! | The Landquarium | David Lewman | Vince Deporter | Hifi | Comicraft |
| 21 | June 12, 2013 | THE KRUSTY KRAB--NABBED! | You Talkin' To Me? | Robert Leighton | Al Jaffee | | Comicraft |
| 22 | July 10, 2013 | | Bubble Double Trouble | Joey Weiser | Gregg Schigiel | Rick Neilsen | Comicraft |
| 22 | July 10, 2013 | | Flotsam & Jetsam: Coral | Maris Wicks | | | Comicraft |
| 22 | July 10, 2013 | | A-Camping We Will Go! | Bob Flynn | | | Comicraft |
| 22 | July 10, 2013 | | See? Dragon! | David Lewman | Vince Deporter | Hifi | Comicraft |
| 22 | July 10, 2013 | | SpongeFunnies | James Kochalka | | | Comicraft |
| 22 | July 10, 2013 | | Brush Strokes | Joey Weiser | Stephen DeStefano | Scott Roberts | Comicraft |
| 22 | July 10, 2013 | | Cool Guys | Joey Weiser | | | Comicraft |
| 22 | July 10, 2013 | | Facial Hair Flair | Shane Houghton | Andy Rementer | | |
| 23 | August 14, 2013 | JELLY PANTS | The Jellyfishing Master | Joey Weiser | Gregg Schigiel | Hifi | Comicraft |
| 23 | August 14, 2013 | JELLY PANTS | SpongeFunnies | James Kochalka | | | Comicraft |
| 23 | August 14, 2013 | JELLY PANTS | The Eye of the Goober | David DeGrand | | | Comicraft |
| 23 | August 14, 2013 | JELLY PANTS | In the Cards | Travis Nichols | | | Comicraft |
| 23 | August 14, 2013 | JELLY PANTS | The Critic | Israel Sanchez | | | Comicraft |
| 23 | August 14, 2013 | JELLY PANTS | Disguise Surprise | David McGuire | | | Comicraft |
| 23 | August 14, 2013 | JELLY PANTS | HEY! | Joey Weiser | Jacob Chabot | Mike Lapinski | Comicraft |
| 24 | September 11, 2013 | HEADS AND TALES | The Money Tree | Graham Annable | | HiFi | Comicraft |
| 24 | September 11, 2013 | HEADS AND TALES | Land Scapegoats | Corey Barba | | | / |
| 24 | September 11, 2013 | HEADS AND TALES | Squidmund Visits | Scott Roberts | Vince Deporter | Mike DeVito | Comicraft |
| 24 | September 11, 2013 | HEADS AND TALES | SpongeFunnies | James Kochalka | | | Comicraft |
| 24 | September 11, 2013 | HEADS AND TALES | Three Second Rule | Dani Michaeli | Aaron Renier | | |
| 24 | September 11, 2013 | HEADS AND TALES | Flotsam and Jetsam Ocean Facts: Sand Dollars | Maris Wicks | | | Comicraft |
| 25 | October 9, 2013 | SOGGY SUPERNATURAL STORIES! | | | | | |
| 26 | November 13, 2013 | SICK DAY | SICK DAY | Joey Weiser | Gregg Schigiel | Monica Kubina | Comicraft |
| 26 | November 13, 2013 | SICK DAY | Squid's in Love | David Lewman | Vanessa Davis | | Comicraft |
| 26 | November 13, 2013 | SICK DAY | SpongeFunnies | James Kochalka | | | Comicraft |
| 26 | November 13, 2013 | SICK DAY | Sundae Stroll | Robert Leighton | Gregg Schigiel | Hifi | Comicraft |
| 26 | November 13, 2013 | SICK DAY | Phone-y Dance Party | Joey Weiser | | | Comicraft |
| 26 | November 13, 2013 | SICK DAY | Flotsam and Jetsam Ocean Facts: Horseshoe Crabs | Maris Wicks | | | Comicraft |
| 26 | November 13, 2013 | SICK DAY | Think Again | Scott Roberts | | | Comicraft |
| 27 | December 11, 2013 | JELLYFISH COURT | Trial by Jelly | Vince Deporter | | Hifi | Comicraft |
| 27 | December 11, 2013 | JELLYFISH COURT | SpongeFunnies | James Kochalka | | | Comicraft |
| 27 | December 11, 2013 | JELLYFISH COURT | The Cost of Inflation | Mark Martin | | | |
| 27 | December 11, 2013 | JELLYFISH COURT | Fix-up Mix-up | Travis Nichols | | | Comicraft |
| 27 | December 11, 2013 | JELLYFISH COURT | Path of Destruction | Robert Leighton | Gary Hallgren | | Comicraft |
| 27 | December 11, 2013 | JELLYFISH COURT | The Blue Bonnet Society | Israel Sanchez | | | Comicraft |
| 27 | December 11, 2013 | JELLYFISH COURT | The Amazing SpongeBot | David DeGrand | | | Comicraft |
| 27 | December 11, 2013 | JELLYFISH COURT | Mystery Date! | Jacob Chabot | | | Comicraft |
| 28 | January 8, 2014 | CURSE OF THE KING KRABBE | Curse of the King Krabbe | Derek Drymon | Jacob Chabot | Rick Neilsen | Comicraft |
| 28 | January 8, 2014 | CURSE OF THE KING KRABBE | Flotsam and Jetsam Ocean Facts: The Arctic | Maris Wicks | | | Comicraft |
| 28 | January 8, 2014 | CURSE OF THE KING KRABBE | My Life as a Crossing Guard (chapter 1) | Derek Drymon | | Mark Martin | Comicraft |
| 28 | January 8, 2014 | CURSE OF THE KING KRABBE | Every Problem Has a Stew-Lution! | Kevin Cannon | | | |
| 28 | January 8, 2014 | CURSE OF THE KING KRABBE | SpongeFunnies | James Kochalka | | | Comicraft |
| 29 | February 12, 2014 | SCIENTIFIC SQUIRREL STORIES FOR NUTS LIKE YOU! | Monkey Sea, Monkey Do! | Chuck Dixon | Jacob Chabot | Monica Kubina | Comicraft |
| 29 | February 12, 2014 | SCIENTIFIC SQUIRREL STORIES FOR NUTS LIKE YOU! | Sandy vs Plankton | James Kochalka | Hilary Barta | Hifi | Comicraft |
| 29 | February 12, 2014 | SCIENTIFIC SQUIRREL STORIES FOR NUTS LIKE YOU! | Pore of the Worlds | David DeGrand | | | Comicraft |
| 29 | February 12, 2014 | SCIENTIFIC SQUIRREL STORIES FOR NUTS LIKE YOU! | Scaredy Snail | Derek Drymon/Stephen R. Bissette | | Mike Devito | Comicraft |
| 29 | February 12, 2014 | SCIENTIFIC SQUIRREL STORIES FOR NUTS LIKE YOU! | Flotsam and Jetsam Ocean Facts: Squirrels?! | Maris Wicks | | | Comicraft |
| 29 | February 12, 2014 | SCIENTIFIC SQUIRREL STORIES FOR NUTS LIKE YOU! | It's Very Simple, SpongeBob! | Robert Leighton | R. Sikoryak | | |
| 29 | February 12, 2014 | SCIENTIFIC SQUIRREL STORIES FOR NUTS LIKE YOU! | Wet and Wild West | Travis Nichols | | | Comicraft |
| 29 | February 12, 2014 | SCIENTIFIC SQUIRREL STORIES FOR NUTS LIKE YOU! | No Cavities | James Kochalka | | | Comicraft |
| 30 | March 12, 2014 | ALAS, POOR SANDWICH! | Puff's Pageant | David Lewman | Jacob Chabot | Hifi | Comicraft |
| 30 | March 12, 2014 | ALAS, POOR SANDWICH! | Patty Pal | Shane Houghton | Stephanie Gladden | Monica Kubina | Comicraft |
| 30 | March 12, 2014 | ALAS, POOR SANDWICH! | Bottled Up | David DeGrand | | | Comicraft |
| 30 | March 12, 2014 | ALAS, POOR SANDWICH! | No Contest | Robert Leighton | Mark Martin | | Comicraft |
| 30 | March 12, 2014 | ALAS, POOR SANDWICH! | SpongeFunnies | James Kochalka | | | Comicraft |
| 30 | March 12, 2014 | ALAS, POOR SANDWICH! | Wrinkles in Time | Travis Nichols | | | Comicraft |
| 31 | April 9, 2014 | | Kings of the Night | Joey Weiser | Vince Deporter | Hifi | Comicraft |
| 31 | April 9, 2014 | | SpongeBob Shapes Up | David DeGrand | | | Comicraft |
| 31 | April 9, 2014 | | CARRRD SHARRRKS | Gregg Schigiel | | Monica Kubina | Comicraft |
| 31 | April 9, 2014 | | Mermaid Man in Love | Chuck Dixon | Ramona Fradon | Jim Campbell | Comicraft |
| 31 | April 9, 2014 | | SpongeFunnies | James Kochalka | | | Comicraft |
| 31 | April 9, 2014 | | Total Coverage | Max Riffner | Vince Deporter | Monica Kubina | Comicraft |
| 31 | April 9, 2014 | | Flotsam and Jetsam Ocean Facts: The Intertidal Zone | Maris Wicks | | | Comicraft |
| 31 | April 9, 2014 | | Quite a Pickle! | Joey Weiser | Eleanor Davis | | |
| 32 | May 14, 2014 | SHOWDOWN AT THE SHADY SHOALS (Part 1 of 5) | Showdown at the Shady Shoals (part 1) | Derek Drymon | Derek Drymon/Jerry Ordway | Hifi | Comicraft |
| 32 | May 14, 2014 | SHOWDOWN AT THE SHADY SHOALS (Part 1 of 5) | Experience! Explore! Esperanto! | Brian Murnane | Jacob Chabot | | Comicraft |
| 32 | May 14, 2014 | SHOWDOWN AT THE SHADY SHOALS (Part 1 of 5) | SpongeFunnies | James Kochalka | | | Comicraft |
| 32 | May 14, 2014 | SHOWDOWN AT THE SHADY SHOALS (Part 1 of 5) | Dish Sponge | Caleb Meurer | | | Comicraft |
| 32 | May 14, 2014 | SHOWDOWN AT THE SHADY SHOALS (Part 1 of 5) | Squidward's Shell Phone | Vince Deporter | | Monica Kubina | Comicraft |
| 32 | May 14, 2014 | SHOWDOWN AT THE SHADY SHOALS (Part 1 of 5) | The Haircut | Joey Weiser | Andy Rementer | | Comicraft |
| 32 | May 14, 2014 | SHOWDOWN AT THE SHADY SHOALS (Part 1 of 5) | If the Sheet Fits! | Brian Smith | | | Comicraft |
| 32 | May 14, 2014 | SHOWDOWN AT THE SHADY SHOALS (Part 1 of 5) | Which Socks Will SpongeBob Wear? | Travis Nichols | | | Comicraft |
| 33 | June 11, 2014 | SUMMER SMASH! | Survival Snail | Joey Weiser | Jacob Chabot | Monica Kubina | Comicraft |
| 33 | June 11, 2014 | SUMMER SMASH! | Leaky Dome | Brian Smith | | | Comicraft |
| 33 | June 11, 2014 | SUMMER SMASH! | Invasion | Brian Smith | Gregg Schigiel | Mike Devito | Comicraft |
| 33 | June 11, 2014 | SUMMER SMASH! | SpongeSummer SuperFunnies | James Kochalka | | | Comicraft |
| 33 | June 11, 2014 | SUMMER SMASH! | Showdown at the Shady Shoals (part 2) | Derek Drymon | Derek Drymon/Jerry Ordway | Hifi | Comicraft |
| 33 | June 11, 2014 | SUMMER SMASH! | Hooked by Esperanto | Brian Bernard Murnane | Jacob Chabot | | Comicraft |
| 33 | June 11, 2014 | SUMMER SMASH! | Hot Spot | David McGuire | | | Comicraft |
| 33 | June 11, 2014 | SUMMER SMASH! | Flotsam and Jetsam Ocean Facts: Jellies | Maris Wicks | | | Comicraft |
| 34 | July 9, 2014 | RIDE 'EM, HORSIEPANTS! | The Shucking Seahorse! | Gregg Schigiel | | Monica Kubina | Comicraft |
| 34 | July 9, 2014 | RIDE 'EM, HORSIEPANTS! | ZAP! | Travis Nichols | | | Comicraft |
| 34 | July 9, 2014 | RIDE 'EM, HORSIEPANTS! | Posture Perfect | Joey Weiser | | | Comicraft |
| 34 | July 9, 2014 | RIDE 'EM, HORSIEPANTS! | SpongeFunnies | James Kochalka | | | Comicraft |
| 34 | July 9, 2014 | RIDE 'EM, HORSIEPANTS! | Inviting Disaster | Robert Leighton | Scott Roberts/Stephen DeStefano | Jim Campbell | Comicraft |
| 34 | July 9, 2014 | RIDE 'EM, HORSIEPANTS! | Showdown at the Shady Shoals (part 3) | Derek Drymon | Derek Drymon/Jerry Ordway | Hifi | Comicraft |
| 34 | July 9, 2014 | RIDE 'EM, HORSIEPANTS! | The Language That Made A Man-Chovy Out of Dan Chovy | Brian Bernard Murnane | Jacob Chabot | | Comicraft |
| 34 | July 9, 2014 | RIDE 'EM, HORSIEPANTS! | Mixed Signals | Rich Tommaso | | | |
| 35 | August 13, 2014 | PLANKTON'S PLAYTIME! | | | | | |
| 36 | September 10, 2014 | THE ALL-NEW! ALL-DIFFERENT! | | | | | |
| 37 | October 8, 2014 | UNDERWATER DREAMS AND NIGHTMARES | Patrick and the Pants | David Lewman | Jacob Chabot | Hifi | Rob Leigh |
| 37 | October 8, 2014 | UNDERWATER DREAMS AND NIGHTMARES | Dreamboat | Dani Michaeli | Ulises Farinas | Ryan Hill | Rob Leigh |
| 37 | October 8, 2014 | UNDERWATER DREAMS AND NIGHTMARES | Nightmare Calling | David Lewman | David DeGrand | | Rob Leigh |
| 37 | October 8, 2014 | UNDERWATER DREAMS AND NIGHTMARES | Flotsam and Jetsam Ocean Facts: Some Parasites of the Ocean | Maris Wicks | | | Comicraft |
| 37 | October 8, 2014 | UNDERWATER DREAMS AND NIGHTMARES | SpongeFunnies | James Kochalka | | | Comicraft |
| 37 | October 8, 2014 | UNDERWATER DREAMS AND NIGHTMARES | Dreams of the Dreaming Dreamer | Derek Drymon | Theo Ellsworth | Dave Stewart | Theo Ellsworth |
| 37 | October 8, 2014 | UNDERWATER DREAMS AND NIGHTMARES | Little Snail Lost | Bob Flynn | | | Comicraft |
| 38 | November 12, 2014 | COMFY-COZY CRISIS! | The Sweater | Corey Barba | Jacob Chabot | Hifi | Comicraft |
| 38 | November 12, 2014 | COMFY-COZY CRISIS! | Can You Pop This? | Joey Weiser | | | Rob Leigh |
| 38 | November 12, 2014 | COMFY-COZY CRISIS! | SpongeFunnies | James Kochalka | | | Comicraft |
| 38 | November 12, 2014 | COMFY-COZY CRISIS! | A True Fan! | Joey Weiser | Drew Weing | | |
| 38 | November 12, 2014 | COMFY-COZY CRISIS! | A Pet Supply Sale! | Travis Nichols | | | Comicraft |
| 38 | November 12, 2014 | COMFY-COZY CRISIS! | The Eternal Struggle | Brian Smith | Gregg Schigiel | Monica Kubina | Rob Leigh |
| 38 | November 12, 2014 | COMFY-COZY CRISIS! | Regeneration A-Go-Go | David DeGrand | | | Rob Leigh |
| 38 | November 12, 2014 | COMFY-COZY CRISIS! | Guard Worm | Richard Pursel | Stephen DeStefano | Levon Jihanian | Rob Leigh |
| 39 | December 10, 2014 | | Com-ick | David Lewman | Gregg Schigiel | Monica Kubina | Comicraft |
| 39 | December 10, 2014 | | Grudge With Your Grub | Kaz | Gary Leib | | |
| 39 | December 10, 2014 | | SpongeFunnies | James Kochalka | | | Comicraft |
| 39 | December 10, 2014 | | The Answer! | Colleen Venable | Gregg Schigiel | Hifi | Rob Leigh |
| 39 | December 10, 2014 | | Flotsam and Jetsam Ocean Facts: Pufferfish | Maris Wicks | | | Comicraft |
| 39 | December 10, 2014 | | Ship Wrecked | David DeGrand | | | Rob Leigh |
| 40 | January 14, 2015 | PANICKY VOLCANO ISSUE | Guest to Pest | Scott Roberts | Scott Roberts/Mark Martin/Cassadee Clements | Scott Roberts | Rob Leigh |
| 40 | January 14, 2015 | PANICKY VOLCANO ISSUE | Flotsam and Jetsam Ocean Facts: Hydro-Thermal Deep Sea Vents | Maris Wicks | | | Comicraft |
| 40 | January 14, 2015 | PANICKY VOLCANO ISSUE | Kick the Can | Richard Pursel | Vince Deporter | Hifi | Rob Leigh |
| 40 | January 14, 2015 | PANICKY VOLCANO ISSUE | SpongeFunnies | James Kochalka | | | Comicraft |
| 40 | January 14, 2015 | PANICKY VOLCANO ISSUE | Magma Morons | Kaz | Vince Deporter/Cassadee Clements | Mark Martin | Rob Leigh |
| 40 | January 14, 2015 | PANICKY VOLCANO ISSUE | Formula None | David McGuire | Gregg Schigiel | Monica Kubina | Rob Leigh |
| 40 | January 14, 2015 | PANICKY VOLCANO ISSUE | SpongeBob's Toe Jam | David DeGrand | | | Rob Leigh |
| 40 | January 14, 2015 | PANICKY VOLCANO ISSUE | Flipper Follies | Sam Henderson | | | |
| 41 | February 11, 2015 | NOW PLAYING! EXCLUSIVE ENGAGEMENT! | Star of the Show | Derek Drymon | Jacob Chabot | Hifi | Comicraft |
| 41 | February 11, 2015 | NOW PLAYING! EXCLUSIVE ENGAGEMENT! | Flotsam and Jetsam Ocean Facts: Whale Songs (in the Key of Sea) | Maris Wicks | | | Rob Leigh |
| 41 | February 11, 2015 | NOW PLAYING! EXCLUSIVE ENGAGEMENT! | Snow Job | Derek Drymon | | Mark Martin | Rob Leigh |
| 41 | February 11, 2015 | NOW PLAYING! EXCLUSIVE ENGAGEMENT! | Break a Leg! | Nate Neal | | | Rob Leigh |
| 41 | February 11, 2015 | NOW PLAYING! EXCLUSIVE ENGAGEMENT! | SpongeFunnies | James Kochalka | | | Comicraft |
| 42 | March 11, 2015 | SPOT THE DIFFERENCES! | Spot the Differences | Graham Annable | | Monica Kubina | Rob Leigh |
| 42 | March 11, 2015 | SPOT THE DIFFERENCES! | Interactive SpongeFunnies | James Kochalka | | | Comicraft |
| 42 | March 11, 2015 | SPOT THE DIFFERENCES! | Mixed-Up Masterpiece | Jason Shiga | Jacob Chabot | Monica Kubina | Rob Leigh |
| 42 | March 11, 2015 | SPOT THE DIFFERENCES! | Mermaid Man & Barnacle Boy! Vs! The Newfangled Superheroes! | Dave Roman | | | Rob Leigh |
| 42 | March 11, 2015 | SPOT THE DIFFERENCES! | Neighborhood Watch | Travis Nichols | | | Rob Leigh |
| 42 | March 11, 2015 | SPOT THE DIFFERENCES! | SpongeBob's Special Fold-Up Interactive Mermaid Man Comic Adventure | T. Motley | | | |
| 42 | March 11, 2015 | SPOT THE DIFFERENCES! | The Mystery of the Stolen Kelp-Cake!! | Michael T. Gilbert | | | Rob Leigh |
| 42 | March 11, 2015 | SPOT THE DIFFERENCES! | Finny Fold-Over | Al Jaffee | | | |
| 43 | April 8, 2015 | | Fry Cook 2.0 | Derek Drymon | Gregg Schigiel | Hifi | Rob Leigh |
| 43 | April 8, 2015 | | SpongeFunnies | James Kochalka | | | Rob Leigh |
| 43 | April 8, 2015 | | Flotsam & Jetsam: Worms | Maris Wicks | | | Rob Leigh |
| 43 | April 8, 2015 | | A New Label Maker! | Joey Weiser | Stephen DeStefano | Levan Jihanian | Rob Leigh |
| 43 | April 8, 2015 | | Mommy Dearest | Vince Deporter | | Monica Kubina | Rob Leigh |
| 43 | April 8, 2015 | | Hey, Squidward! | Charles Brubaker | | | Rob Leigh |
| 44 | May 13, 2015 | | Spongefellas | David DeGrand | | | Rob Leigh |
| 44 | May 13, 2015 | | Guest to Pest | Scott Roberts | | | Rob Leigh |
| 44 | May 13, 2015 | | SpongeFunnies | James Kochalka | | | Rob Leigh |
| 44 | May 13, 2015 | | Mail Mischief | Brian Smith | | | Rob Leigh |
| 44 | May 13, 2015 | | My Newest Invention! | Joey Weiser | Stephanie Yue | | Rob Leigh |
| 44 | May 13, 2015 | | Not-So Great Expectations | Chuck Dixon | Jacob Chabot | Hifi | Rob Leigh |
| 44 | May 13, 2015 | | The Secret of the Giant Pink Fuzzy Dice? | Jay Lender | Graham Nolan/Chris Duffy | Glenn Whitmore | Rob Leigh |
| 44 | May 13, 2015 | | Doodles Meets the Skeleton Crew! | Karen Sneider | Rick Altergott | | Rob Leigh |
| 45 | June 10, 2015 | | The Deranged Detector | Brian Smith | | | Rob Leigh |
| 45 | June 10, 2015 | | SpongeFunnies | James Kochalka | | | Rob Leigh |
| 45 | June 10, 2015 | | One Tuesday Afternoon at Squidward's | Robert Leighton | Jacob Chabot | Hifi | Comicraft |
| 45 | June 10, 2015 | | Flotsam & Jetsam: Sea Stars: Inside and Out | Maris Wicks | | | Rob Leigh |
| 45 | June 10, 2015 | | Patrick's Itch | Derek Drymon | Jerry Ordway | Glenn Whitmore | Rob Leigh |
| 45 | June 10, 2015 | | Sandy's New Look | Joey Weiser | Becky Dreistadt | | Rob Leigh |
| 45 | June 10, 2015 | | One Tuesday Afternoon at SpongeBob's | Robert Leighton | Jacob Chabot | Hifi | Comicraft |
| 45 | June 10, 2015 | | Sob Story | David DeGrand | | | Rob Leigh |
| 46 | July 8, 2015 | | The Menace of the Mola Mola! | Bob Flynn | | Jim Campbell | Rob Leigh |
| 46 | July 8, 2015 | | Flotsam & Jetsam: The Mola Mola | Maris Wicks | | | Rob Leigh |
| 46 | July 8, 2015 | | Shrinktopia | Jed Alexander | | | |
| 46 | July 8, 2015 | | Pet Shop Surprise | Charise Mericle Harper | | | |
| 46 | July 8, 2015 | | SpongeFunnies | James Kochalka | | | Rob Leigh |
| 47 | August 12, 2015 | THE FISH STICK COMETH | No More Mr. Ice Guy | Corey Barba | | | Rob Leigh |
| 47 | August 12, 2015 | THE FISH STICK COMETH | See for Yourself! | Robert Leighton | Gregg Schigiel | Hi-Fi | Rob Leigh |
| 47 | August 12, 2015 | THE FISH STICK COMETH | SpongeFunnies | James Kochalka | | | Rob Leigh |
| 47 | August 12, 2015 | THE FISH STICK COMETH | A Day in the Life of Larry the Lifeguard | Sam Henderson | Dean Haspiel | | Rob Leigh |
| 47 | August 12, 2015 | THE FISH STICK COMETH | Bubble Park | Maëlle Doliveux | | | |
| 47 | August 12, 2015 | THE FISH STICK COMETH | Summer Mix-Up | Joey Weiser | | | Rob Leigh |
| 47 | August 12, 2015 | THE FISH STICK COMETH | Plankton and the Amoeba Gang | Richard Pursel | Jacob Chabot | Monica Kubina | Rob Leigh |
| 47 | August 12, 2015 | THE FISH STICK COMETH | One Little Lie | Scott Roberts | | | Rob Leigh |
| 48 | September 9, 2015 | | Have a Nice Day, Gary! | Mark Martin | | | Rob Leigh |
| 48 | September 9, 2015 | | A House for Gary | Jen Wang | | | Rob Leigh |
| 48 | September 9, 2015 | | Gary Patty | David Lewman | Tony Millionaire | Jim Campbell | |
| 48 | September 9, 2015 | | Snail Foot | Richard Pursel | Jacob Chabot | Monica Kubina | Rob Leigh |
| 48 | September 9, 2015 | | In and Out | David Lewman | Stephanie Yue | | Rob Leigh |
| 48 | September 9, 2015 | | A Snail is a Sponge's Best Friend! | James Kochalka | | | Rob Leigh |
| 48 | September 9, 2015 | | Flotsam & Jetsam: Sensational Snails | Maris Wicks | | | Rob Leigh |
| 48 | September 9, 2015 | | Gags for Gastropods | Robert Leighton | | | |
| 49 | October 14, 2015 | | Patty Thing! | Derek Drymon | Gregg Schigiel/Stephen R. Bissette | Hifi | Rob Leigh |
| 49 | October 14, 2015 | | SpongeFunnies | James Kochalka | | | Rob Leigh |
| 49 | October 14, 2015 | | Annual Halloween Costume Contest Tonight! | Mark Martin | | | Rob Leigh |
| 49 | October 14, 2015 | | Flotsam Fables: Legends of the Deep: Sea Monsters | Karen Sneider | Vanessa Davis | | Rob Leigh |
| 49 | October 14, 2015 | | Monster Canyon | Kaz | Tony Millionaire | Jim Campbell | |
| 50 | November 11, 2015 | MARITIME MASHUP! | Mash-Up Pants | Derek Drymon | Gregg Schigiel | Mike Lapinski | Rob Leigh |
| 50 | November 11, 2015 | MARITIME MASHUP! | Being SpongeBob SquarePants | Sam Henderson | Dave DeGrand | Stephen DeStefano | Rob Leigh |
| 50 | November 11, 2015 | MARITIME MASHUP! | SpongeBuds | Bob Flynn | | | Rob Leigh |
| 50 | November 11, 2015 | MARITIME MASHUP! | 50! 50! 50! | Michael T. Gilbert | | | Rob Leigh |
| 50 | November 11, 2015 | MARITIME MASHUP! | SpongeFunnies | James Kochalka | | | Rob Leigh |
| 51 | December 9, 2015 | THE CORAL FOREST | Game Masters | Joey Weiser | Vince Deporter | Monica Kubina | Rob Leigh |
| 51 | December 9, 2015 | THE CORAL FOREST | When You Wish Upon a Pat | Charles Brubaker | | | Rob Leigh |
| 51 | December 9, 2015 | THE CORAL FOREST | Flotsam & Jetsam: Play! | Maris Wicks | | | Rob Leigh |
| 51 | December 9, 2015 | THE CORAL FOREST | For Amusement Only | Jon Chad | | | |
| 51 | December 9, 2015 | THE CORAL FOREST | Late One Night... | Zac Gorman | | | |
| 51 | December 9, 2015 | THE CORAL FOREST | SpongeFunnies | James Kochalka | | | Rob Leigh |
| 51 | December 9, 2015 | THE CORAL FOREST | Serpents & Sealords | Corey Barba | | | Rob Leigh |
| 51 | December 9, 2015 | THE CORAL FOREST | Flipper Follies | Sam Henderson | | | |
| 52 | January 13, 2016 | TRAPPED IN DIMENSION DUH! | A New Dimension in Stupidity | David DeGrand | | | Rob Leigh |
| 52 | January 13, 2016 | TRAPPED IN DIMENSION DUH! | Sharp-Dressed Sponge | Mark Martin | | | Rob Leigh |
| 52 | January 13, 2016 | TRAPPED IN DIMENSION DUH! | Flotsam & Jetsam: The Mimic Octopus | Maris Wicks | | | Rob Leigh |
| 52 | January 13, 2016 | TRAPPED IN DIMENSION DUH! | Krabbyland | Corey Barba | | | Rob Leigh |
| 52 | January 13, 2016 | TRAPPED IN DIMENSION DUH! | In the Deep | Michael Kipperman | | | |
| 52 | January 13, 2016 | TRAPPED IN DIMENSION DUH! | SpongeFunnies | James Kochalka | | | Rob Leigh |
| 53 | February 10, 2016 | SHAKE-O-RAMA | Seaquake! | Chuck Dixon | Jacob Chabot | Hifi | Rob Leigh |
| 53 | February 10, 2016 | SHAKE-O-RAMA | SpongeFunnies | James Kochalka | | | Rob Leigh |
| 53 | February 10, 2016 | SHAKE-O-RAMA | Rocks-in-the-Head Collectors | Vince Deporter | | Monica Kubina | Rob Leigh |
| 53 | February 10, 2016 | SHAKE-O-RAMA | Choice of WORD! | Graham Annable | | Hifi | Rob Leigh |
| 53 | February 10, 2016 | SHAKE-O-RAMA | Got a Match? | David Lewman | Becky Dreistadt | | Rob Leigh |
| 53 | February 10, 2016 | SHAKE-O-RAMA | Flotsam & Jetsam: Sea Cucumbers | Maris Wicks | | | Rob Leigh |
| 54 | March 9, 2016 | 3 SEAWORTHY STORIES! | Squirrel Scout Cookies | Gregg Schigiel | | Monica Kubina | Rob Leigh |
| 54 | March 9, 2016 | 3 SEAWORTHY STORIES! | Patrick's Awesome Shop | James Kochalka | | | Rob Leigh |
| 54 | March 9, 2016 | 3 SEAWORTHY STORIES! | Cheer Up! | Charles Brubaker | | | Rob Leigh |
| 54 | March 9, 2016 | 3 SEAWORTHY STORIES! | Only the Clonely | Brian Smith | | | Rob Leigh |
| 54 | March 9, 2016 | 3 SEAWORTHY STORIES! | Flotsam & Jetsam: Clones! | Maris Wicks | | | Rob Leigh |
| 54 | March 9, 2016 | 3 SEAWORTHY STORIES! | Daze Off | Joey Weiser | Stephanie Yue | | Rob Leigh |
| 54 | March 9, 2016 | 3 SEAWORTHY STORIES! | SpongeFunnies | James Kochalka | | | Rob Leigh |
| 54 | March 9, 2016 | 3 SEAWORTHY STORIES! | Fryer Follies | Sam Henderson | | | Rob Leigh |
| 55 | April 13, 2016 | THE BALLAD OF BARNACLE BILL: PART 1 | The Ballad of Barnacle Bill: Part 1 | Derek Drymon | Jacob Chabot & Stephen DeStefano | Hifi | Rob Leigh |
| 55 | April 13, 2016 | THE BALLAD OF BARNACLE BILL: PART 1 | SpongeFunnies | James Kochalka | | | Rob Leigh |
| 55 | April 13, 2016 | THE BALLAD OF BARNACLE BILL: PART 1 | Flotsam Fables: Legends of the Deep | Karen Sneider | Vanessa Davis | | Rob Leigh |
| 55 | April 13, 2016 | THE BALLAD OF BARNACLE BILL: PART 1 | One Krabby Patrick ...to Go | Corey Barba | | | Rob Leigh |
| 55 | April 13, 2016 | THE BALLAD OF BARNACLE BILL: PART 1 | Mermaid Man at Home | Sam Henderson | Gregg Schigiel | Monica Kubina | Rob Leigh |
| 56 | May 11, 2016 | THE BALLAD OF BARNACLE BILL: PART 2 | The Ballad of Barnacle Bill: Part 2 | Derek Drymon | Jacob Chabot & Stephen DeStefano | Hifi | Rob Leigh |
| 56 | May 11, 2016 | THE BALLAD OF BARNACLE BILL: PART 2 | SpongeFunnies | James Kochalka | | | Rob Leigh |
| 56 | May 11, 2016 | THE BALLAD OF BARNACLE BILL: PART 2 | Plankton Vs. Gary | James Kochalka | Hilary Barta | Jason Millet | Rob Leigh |
| 56 | May 11, 2016 | THE BALLAD OF BARNACLE BILL: PART 2 | Goose on the Loose | Corey Barba | | | Rob Leigh |
| 56 | May 11, 2016 | THE BALLAD OF BARNACLE BILL: PART 2 | Flotsam & Jetsam: Ship Worms | Maris Wicks | | | Rob Leigh |
| 57 | June 8, 2016 | WHAT'S BLACK AND WHITE [AND YELLOW]? | The Wrong Sponge! | Vince Deporter | | | Rob Leigh |
| 57 | June 8, 2016 | WHAT'S BLACK AND WHITE [AND YELLOW]? | On the Lam | Derek Drymon | | Monica Kubina | Rob Leigh |
| 57 | June 8, 2016 | WHAT'S BLACK AND WHITE [AND YELLOW]? | SpongeFunnies | James Kochalka | | | Rob Leigh |
| 57 | June 8, 2016 | WHAT'S BLACK AND WHITE [AND YELLOW]? | The Clarinet of Dr. Calamari! | Jay Lender | Marc Hempel | Scott Roberts | Rob Leigh |
| 57 | June 8, 2016 | WHAT'S BLACK AND WHITE [AND YELLOW]? | The Really Long Goodbye | Robert Leighton | Andrea Tsurumi | | Rob Leigh |
| 57 | June 8, 2016 | WHAT'S BLACK AND WHITE [AND YELLOW]? | Flotsam & Jetsam: Hermit Crab Confidential | Maris Wicks | | | Rob Leigh |
| 57 | June 8, 2016 | WHAT'S BLACK AND WHITE [AND YELLOW]? | Where Heroes Fear to Tread | Chuck Dixon | Hilary Barta | Jason Millet | Rob Leigh |
| 57 | June 8, 2016 | WHAT'S BLACK AND WHITE [AND YELLOW]? | One Night in Bikini Bottom | Hilary Barta | Jacob Chabot | | Rob Leigh |
| 58 | July 13, 2016 | LARRY AND PATRICK: TWO MAROONS! | Crusoem Twosome | Jay Lender | Jacob Chabot | Hifi | Rob Leigh |
| 58 | July 13, 2016 | LARRY AND PATRICK: TWO MAROONS! | SpongeFunnies | James Kochalka | | | Rob Leigh |
| 58 | July 13, 2016 | LARRY AND PATRICK: TWO MAROONS! | Jelly Wish | Corey Barba | Gregg Schigiel | Monica Kubina | Rob Leigh |
| 58 | July 13, 2016 | LARRY AND PATRICK: TWO MAROONS! | Flotsam & Jetsam: Barbels | Maris Wicks | | | Rob Leigh |
| 58 | July 13, 2016 | LARRY AND PATRICK: TWO MAROONS! | The Great Big Breakfast Fiasco!!! | John Trabbic | | | Rob Leigh |
| 59 | August 10, 2016 | DRY NOON | | | | | |
| 60 | September 14, 2016 | LIAR! LIAR! SQUAREPANTS ON FIRE! | The Liar! | Chuck Dixon | Jacob Chabot | Hifi | Rob Leigh |
| 60 | September 14, 2016 | LIAR! LIAR! SQUAREPANTS ON FIRE! | Substitute Teacher! | Charles Brubaker | | | Rob Leigh |
| 60 | September 14, 2016 | LIAR! LIAR! SQUAREPANTS ON FIRE! | SpongeFunnies | James Kochalka | | | Rob Leigh |
| 60 | September 14, 2016 | LIAR! LIAR! SQUAREPANTS ON FIRE! | The Legend of Paul Spatula | David Lewman | Vince Deporter | Monica Kubina | Rob Leigh |
| 60 | September 14, 2016 | LIAR! LIAR! SQUAREPANTS ON FIRE! | Sandy's Aunt | Scott Roberts | | | Rob Leigh |
| 60 | September 14, 2016 | LIAR! LIAR! SQUAREPANTS ON FIRE! | Flotsam & Jetsam: Submersibles | Maris Wicks | | | Rob Leigh |
| 60 | September 14, 2016 | LIAR! LIAR! SQUAREPANTS ON FIRE! | Gallery Goof-Up | David DeGrand | | | Rob Leigh |
| 61 | October 12, 2016 | | The Krusty CURSE! or The Luck of Mr. Patrick Star | Vince Deporter | | Michael Lapinski | Rob Leigh |
| 61 | October 12, 2016 | | The House on Jellyfish Fields | Graham Annable | | Monica Kubina | Rob Leigh |
| 61 | October 12, 2016 | | SpongeFunnies | James Kochalka | | | Rob Leigh |
| 61 | October 12, 2016 | | Halloween Party | Bob Flynn | Bob Flynn/Jim Campbell | | Rob Leigh |
| 61 | October 12, 2016 | | Flotsam Fables: Ghost Ships | Karen Sneider | Vanessa Davis | | Rob Leigh |
| 62 | November 9, 2016 | | Squidward's Mythological Madness | Jay Lender | Gregg Schigiel | Hifi | Rob Leigh |
| 62 | November 9, 2016 | | SpongeFunnies | James Kochalka | | | Rob Leigh |
| 62 | November 9, 2016 | | Mythed the Movie | Corey Barba | | | Rob Leigh |
| 62 | November 9, 2016 | | Sea of BEARD! | James Kochalka | Hilary Barta | Jason Millet | Rob Leigh |
| 62 | November 9, 2016 | | Magically Moronic | David DeGrand | | | Rob Leigh |
| 62 | November 9, 2016 | | Flotsam Fables: The Kraken | Karen Sneider | Vanessa Davis | | Rob Leigh |
| 62 | November 9, 2016 | | Flotsam & Jetsam: Giant Squid | Maris Wicks | | | Rob Leigh |
| 62 | November 9, 2016 | | Ahoy, Musk! | George O'Connor | | | Rob Leigh |
| 63 | December 14, 2016 | WHO IS MERMAID GIRL? (Part 1 of 2) | | | | | |
| 64 | January 11, 2017 | GO, SNAIL BABIES, GO! | | | | | |
| 65 | February 8, 2017 | SANDY'S TREK | | | | | |
| 66 | March 8, 2017 | THE PIRATES WHO COLLECTED SPONGEBOB | | | | | |
| 67 | April 12, 2017 | IT'S HIP TO BE SQUAREPANTS | | | | | |
| 68 | May 10, 2017 | ROCKIN' DOWN THE BOATWAY! | | | | | |
| 69 | June 14, 2017 | RETURN TO TERROR TRENCH! | | | | | |
| 70 | July 12, 2017 | LOST BOOTY! (Part 5 o' 5) | | | | | |
| 71 | August 9, 2017 | | | | | | |
| 72 | September 13, 2017 | | | | | | |
| 73 | October 11, 2017 | CURSE OF THE U.S.S. UNPLEASANT! | | | | | |
| 74 | November 8, 2017 | FISHY FRIENDS 4-EVER! | | | | | |
| 75 | December 13, 2017 | EPIC SPONGE-FUNNIES | | | | | |
| 76 | January 10, 2018 | UNTIDALED (Part 1 of 2) | | | | | |
| 77 | February 14, 2018 | UNTIDALED (Part 2 of 2) | | | | | |
| 78 | March 14, 2018 | FROM HERE TO INFINI-TEETH! | Stretching the Tooth! | John Trabbic | | Hifi | Rob Leigh |
| 78 | March 14, 2018 | FROM HERE TO INFINI-TEETH! | 5th Annual Bikini Bottom Bicycle Sprint | Israel Sanchez | | | Rob Leigh |
| 78 | March 14, 2018 | FROM HERE TO INFINI-TEETH! | Putt 'er There! | Brian Smith | | | Rob Leigh |
| 78 | March 14, 2018 | FROM HERE TO INFINI-TEETH! | Flotsam and Jetsam Ocean Facts: Welcome to the Cleaning Station | Maris Wicks | | | Rob Leigh |
| 78 | March 14, 2018 | FROM HERE TO INFINI-TEETH! | Shadow Play | Charles Brubaker | | | Rob Leigh |
| 78 | March 14, 2018 | FROM HERE TO INFINI-TEETH! | SpongeFunnies | James Kochalka | | | Rob Leigh |
| 79 | April 11, 2018 | | A Crosshatch of Despair | Charles Brubaker | Jacob Chabot | Monica Kubina | Rob Leigh |
| 79 | April 11, 2018 | | Flotsam and Jetsam Ocean Facts: Eye Spy With My Big Fake Eye... | Maris Wicks | | | Rob Leigh |
| 79 | April 11, 2018 | | SpongeBob's Facial Scare | Carta Monir | Carolyn Nowak | | Rob Leigh |
| 79 | April 11, 2018 | | Great Manowar Migration in Bikini Bottom | Cole Closser | | | Rob Leigh |
| 79 | April 11, 2018 | | The Buddy System | David Lewman | Vince Deporter | Hifi | Rob Leigh |
| 79 | April 11, 2018 | | SpongeFunnies | James Kochalka | | | Rob Leigh |
| 79 | April 11, 2018 | | Trash Day | David DeGrand | | | Rob Leigh |
| 79 | April 11, 2018 | | Squilliam's Art Opening | Carta Monir | Kevin Scalzo | Jim Campbell | Rob Leigh |
| 80 | May 9, 2018 | SQUIDWARD'S KITCHEN ADVENTURE | | | | | |
| 81 | June 13, 2018 | JOURNEY TO THE CENTER OF THE SPONGE! | | | | | |
| 82 | July 11, 2018 | | | | | | |
| 83 | August 8, 2018 | BITE INTO OUR PLANKTON ISSUE! | | | | | |
| 84 | September 12, 2018 | | | | | | |
| 85 | October 10, 2018 | WHAT HORRORS HAUNT THE DEEP? | | | | | |

=== Annuals ===
| Issue # | Release date | Caption | Story titles | Story | Art | Colors | Lettering |
|---|---|---|---|---|---|---|---|
| 1 | June 19, 2013 | Annual Super-Giant Swimtacular #1 | | | | | |
| 2 | June 18, 2014 | Annual-Size Super-Giant Swimtacular #2 | | | | | |
| 3 | June 17, 2015 | Annual-Size Super-Giant Swimtacular #3 | Bikini Bottom Wasteland; The Consumer is Always Right: A SpongeBob ConsumerPants Tale; The Future Is Wow! Mermaid Man 39,616 AD; Planet of the Fish | | | | |
| 4 | June 15, 2016 | Annual-Size Super-Giant Swimtacular #4 | | | | | |
| 5 | June 21, 2017 | Annual-Size Super-Giant Swimtacular #5 | | | | | |
| 6 | June 20, 2018 | Annual-Size Super-Giant Swimtacular #6 | | | | | |

=== Free Comic Book Day (Freestyle Funnies) ===
"*" = Comic is a compilation of comics from main SpongeBob Comics series, and half of a Simpsons Free Comic Book Day issue.

| Issue # | Release date | Caption | Title | Story | Art | Colors | Lettering |
|---|---|---|---|---|---|---|---|
| 1 | May 5, 2012 | Freestyle Funnies* | | | | | |
| 2 | May 4, 2013 | Freestyle Funnies | Paint Misbehavin' | Derek Drymon | | Mike DeVito | Comicraft |
| 2 | May 4, 2013 | Freestyle Funnies | Flotsam & Jetsam: Camouflage | Maris Wicks | | | Comicraft |
| 2 | May 4, 2013 | Freestyle Funnies | MermaidMan & BarnacleBoy in: The Claws of the Catfishstress! | Gregg Schigiel | | Lee Loughridge | Comicraft |
| 2 | May 4, 2013 | Freestyle Funnies | A SpongeBob Fill-in Comic by You and Patrick | Chris Duffy | Andy Rementer | | Comicraft |
| 2 | May 4, 2013 | Freestyle Funnies | Day of the Free Comic | Graham Annable | Gregg Schigiel | Hifi | Comicraft |
| 2 | May 4, 2013 | Freestyle Funnies | Lo, There Shall Be a Catered Affair! (Special 4-page Preview!) | Derek Drymon | Derek Drymon & Jerry Ordway | Mike Lapinski | Comicraft |
| 3 | May 3, 2014 | Freestyle Funnies 2014 | Relocate! | Graham Annable | Jacob Chabot | Mike Lapinski | Comicraft |
| 3 | May 3, 2014 | Freestyle Funnies 2014 | Flipper Follies | Sam Henderson | | | |
| 3 | May 3, 2014 | Freestyle Funnies 2014 | Yoga with Sandy | Andy Rementer | | | |
| 3 | May 3, 2014 | Freestyle Funnies 2014 | MermaidMan & BarnacleBoy in: 8-Armed & Dangerous! | Gregg Schigiel | | | Comicraft |
| 3 | May 3, 2014 | Freestyle Funnies 2014 | Underswimming Comics | Corey Barba | | | Comicraft |
| 3 | May 3, 2014 | Freestyle Funnies 2014 | SpongeBob, Wait! | James Kochalka | | | Comicraft |
| 4 | May 2, 2015 | Freestyle Funnies 2015 | Tangy! | Graham Annable | | Hifi | Rob Leigh |
| 4 | May 2, 2015 | Freestyle Funnies 2015 | Free Comic Book Dude | James Kochalka | | | Rob Leigh |
| 4 | May 2, 2015 | Freestyle Funnies 2015 | Flotsam & Jetsam: Stingers! | Maris Wicks | | | Rob Leigh |
| 4 | May 2, 2015 | Freestyle Funnies 2015 | Crush of the Deep | Graham Annable | Jacob Chabot | Monica Kubina | Rob Leigh |
| 4 | May 2, 2015 | Freestyle Funnies 2015 | One, Two... Free! | Joey Weiser | | | Rob Leigh |
| 5 | May 7, 2016 | Freestyle Funnies 2016 | Farewell to my Arms! | Israel Sanchez | | Ryan Hernandez | Rob Leigh |
| 5 | May 7, 2016 | Freestyle Funnies 2016 | Whirled View | Robert Leighton | Jacob Chabot | | Rob Leigh |
| 5 | May 7, 2016 | Freestyle Funnies 2016 | Flotsam & Jetsam: Underwater Mountains | Maris Wicks | | | Rob Leigh |
| 5 | May 7, 2016 | Freestyle Funnies 2016 | Patrick's Guide to Getting Stuff for Free | James Kochalka | | | Rob Leigh |
| 5 | May 7, 2016 | Freestyle Funnies 2016 | MermaidMan & BarnacleBoy in: Bedlam! in Bikini Bottom! | Evan Dorkin | Ramona Fradon | Jim Campbell | Rob Leigh |
| 6 | May 6, 2017 | Freestyle Funnies 2017 | The Great Funnybook Giveaway! | Jay Lender | Jacob Chabot | Hifi | Rob Leigh |
| 6 | May 6, 2017 | Freestyle Funnies 2017 | Flotsam & Jetsam: All About Waterspouts | Steven Stern | Nate Neal | | Rob Leigh |
| 6 | May 6, 2017 | Freestyle Funnies 2017 | MermaidMan & BarnacleBoy Cereal | James Kochalka | | | Rob Leigh |
| 6 | May 6, 2017 | Freestyle Funnies 2017 | The Stuff of Life! | Robert Leighton | Gregg Schigiel | Monica Kubina | Rob Leigh |
| 7 | May 5, 2018 | Freestyle Funnies 2018 | Super-Villain Team-Up! | Derek Drymon | Robb Bihun | John Kalisz | Rob Leigh |
| 7 | May 5, 2018 | Freestyle Funnies 2018 | Patrick vs. Somebody! | James Kochalka | Vanessa Davis | | Rob Leigh |
| 7 | May 5, 2018 | Freestyle Funnies 2018 | Flotsam & Jetsam: B.F.F.s (Benthic Friends Forever) | Maris Wicks | | | Rob Leigh |
| 7 | May 5, 2018 | Freestyle Funnies 2018 | SpongeFunnies | James Kochalka | | | Rob Leigh |

== Collected Editions ==
| Title | Some Material Collected From | Publication dates | Publishers | ISBN |
|---|---|---|---|---|
| Comic Crazy | Nickelodeon Magazine | June 9, 2009 | Simon & Schuster | 978-1-8473-8631-1 |
| Comic Crazy: Take 2 | Nickelodeon Magazine | May 27, 2010 | Simon & Schuster | 978-1-8473-8970-1 |
| SpongeBob Comics #1: Silly Sea Stories | SpongeBob Comics #2-9, 12, 14, 21, 23 & 29 | May 2, 2017 | Amulet Books | 978-1-4197-2319-3 |
| SpongeBob Comics #2: Aquatic Adventurers, Unite! | SpongeBob Comics #3, 7, 9, 10, 17, 19, 35, Annual 1, 2 & FCBD 2013 | May 2, 2017 | Amulet Books | 978-1-4197-2320-9 |
| SpongeBob Comics #3: Tales from the Haunted Pineapple | SpongeBob Comics #5, 6, 9, 11, 13, 14, 18, 22, 25 & 29 | August 15, 2017 | Amulet Books | 978-1-4197-2560-9 |
| SpongeBob Comics: Treasure Chest | SpongeBob Comics #2, 11–15, 17, 18, 22, 26, 27, 29, 32–36, 42, Annual 2, 3 & FCBD 2013. Facsimile reprint of SpongeBob Comics #1. | October 3, 2017 | Abrams ComicArts | 978-1-4197-2561-6 |
