= Jove Books =

Book publishing company in New York City

- Parent company: Berkley Books (Penguin Group)
- Founded: 1949; 77 years ago
- Founder: Alfred R. Plaine and Matthew Huttner
- Country of origin: United States
- Headquarters location: New York City
- Official website: berkleyjoveauthors.com

Jove Books, formerly known as Pyramid Books, is an American paperback and eBook publishing imprint, founded as an independent paperback house in 1949 by Almat Magazine Publishers (also known as Almat Publishing Corporation) (Alfred R. Plaine and Matthew Huttner). The company was sold to the Walter Reade Organization in the late 1960s. It was acquired in 1974 by Harcourt Brace (which became Harcourt Brace Jovanovich) which renamed it to Jove in 1977 and continued the line as an imprint. In 1979, they sold it to The Putnam Berkley Group, which is now part of the Penguin Group.

== History ==
=== 1949–1969 ===
Phil Hirsch was vice president of Pyramid Books from 1955 to 1975 and had his name as author or editor on many of Pyramid's books, many of them anthologies of jokes, cartoons and humor, or concerned with the military and warfare, including some which combined those interests. While not the most prolific publisher of science fiction and fantasy during its years as Pyramid, it did offer some notable original titles in book form, such as Algis Budrys's novel Who? (1958), Theodore Sturgeon's novel Venus Plus X (1960) and several collections of Sturgeon's short fiction, as well as collections, novels and anthologies by Harlan Ellison and Judith Merril. Pyramid speculative fiction editor (1957–67) Donald R. Bensen edited two notable and popular anthologies drawn from the fantasy-fiction magazine Unknown, The Unknown (1963) and The Unknown 5 (1964), the latter including an introduction by and a previously unpublished story by Isaac Asimov, the story having been slated for publication by the magazine, which folded before it could appear. Pyramid in the 1960s also published several notable anthologies edited by L. Sprague de Camp, which helped create a sense of a tradition of sword & sorcery fantasy, and a series of four anthologies drawn from the magazine Weird Tales, attributed to magazine publisher and editor Leo Margulies, though the latter two were apparently "ghost-edited" by Sam Moskowitz (Margulies and Moskowitz would in the 1970s launch a short-lived revival of the magazine). Among the notable paperback reprint editions Pyramid published in the 1950s and '60s were several collections by Robert Heinlein, Hal Clement's novel Mission of Gravity, and de Camp and Fletcher Pratt's The Incompleat Enchanter. Pyramid also published Evan Hunter's science fiction novel Tomorrow and Tomorrow (1956 as by Hunt Collins), and a paperback reprint of Shirley Jackson's novel The Road Through the Wall (1956) in two editions with the variant title The Other Side of the Street (the first in 1958). Notable among the original publications in crime fiction were Death is My Dancing Partner (1959), a late novel by Cornell Woolrich, and such anthologies as The Young Punks (also 1959) attributed to Leo Margulies as editor.

In the 1960s Pyramid published two of the first three books attributed to Cordwainer Smith, one of the fiction-writing pseudonyms of Paul Linebarger, and began reprinting Fu Manchu novels by Sax Rohmer and pulp sf adventure novels by E. E. Smith, as well as several novelizations of Irwin Allen television shows and films, including one for Lost in Space and two others for The Time Tunnel, and Sturgeon's movie novelization for Voyage to the Bottom of the Sea. Other original book publications in the 1960s included the first of Harry Harrison's Stainless Steel Rat novels (1961), Avram Davidson's Masters of the Maze (1965) and Chester Anderson's cult novel The Butterfly Kid (1967). Asimov and the biologist John C. Lilly were among those who published popular-science books with Pyramid in the 1960s. They have also the simplified English edition books published by their division Ladder Edition, example is “Battle Hymn” by Dean Hess (1956).

=== 1970–present ===
Among the notable projects at Pyramid in the 1970s was a series of reprints of the pulp magazine novels and novellas about the Shadow, published as by Maxwell Grant; Ellison in 1975 and '76 saw an eleven-volume set of his books reprinted or, in the cases of The Other Glass Teat and No Doors, No Windows (both 1975), published for the first time, in matching cover format featuring the art of Leo and Diane Dillon. Also, a brief "Harlan Ellison Discovery" series of books, as edited for Pyramid (and, for the last volume, Jove) by Ellison, featured Bruce Sterling's first novel Involution Ocean (1977) and Terry Carr's collection The Light at the End of the Universe (1976). But the most prominent and best-selling books Pyramid published in the 1970s were the series of historical novels written by John Jakes, the Kent Family Chronicles, beginning with The Bastard (1974), which were well-timed for popular interest in the U.S. Revolutionary War and the bicentennial celebration of independence. More modest or more critical than commercial successes published in the decade included Man on Fire: A Novel of Revolution by Bruce Douglas Reeves (1971) and several novels by Barry N. Malzberg.

A series of "crossover" books, bridging prose fiction and comics, was the eight-volume Weird Heroes series of anthologies and novels (1975–77), where new superheroes and pulp-magazine-style adventure heroes were featured, as edited for Pyramid by Byron Preiss, and featuring contributions from, among others, Ellison, Philip José Farmer, Jeff Jones, Archie Goodwin, Michael Moorcock, Beth Meacham, Jim Steranko, Ted White and novels as well as short fiction by Ron Goulart. Another Preiss project with Pyramid was in more-traditional, if early, graphic novel format, the Fiction Illustrated series.

The Jove branding was refocused not long after the purchase by the Putnam Berkeley Group, away from fantastic fiction generally and more toward crime fiction, further publication of John Jakes's and similar historical fiction, romance novels (including some with fantasy elements), and western series novels, such as the Longarm (book series) franchise; among the last notable fantasy-fiction titles as an HBJ/Jove Book was the 1979 variant edition of Robert Bloch's collection Pleasant Dreams, which varies in content from all previous editions (but like them, includes Bloch's fleshing out of an unfinished short story by Edgar Allan Poe, originally published as "The Light-House" in 1953).
