= Marc Hempel =

American cartoonist/comics artist (born 1957)

- Marc Hempel's Tug & Buster
- Born: May 25, 1957 (age 69) Chicago, Illinois
- Area: Illustrator
- Notable works: Gregory; The Sandman: The Kindly Ones; Tug & Buster
- Awards: Inkpot Award 1992

Marc Hempel (born May 25, 1957) is an American cartoonist and comics artist best known for his work on The Sandman with Neil Gaiman.

== Biography ==
Writer and artist Marc Hempel grew up in the northwest suburbs of Chicago and now lives in Baltimore. He received a B.F.A. in Painting from Northern Illinois University in 1980. He and Mark Wheatley co-created the titles Breathtaker, Blood of the Innocent, and Mars. In 1994–1995, he collaborated with Neil Gaiman on the climactic story arc "The Kindly Ones" in The Sandman. Hempel's own creations Gregory and Tug & Buster were nominated for several industry awards, and his humor anthology Naked Brain was named "Best Comic Book" in the Baltimore City Paper's "Best of Baltimore 2003" issue. His art has also appeared in Marvel Fanfare, Epic Illustrated, Heavy Metal, Jonny Quest, Tarzan the Warrior, Clive Barker’s Hellraiser, Flinch, My Faith in Frankie, The Dreaming, Lucifer, and Disney Adventures.

Original art from The Sandman and Breathtaker was included in an exhibition entitled "LitGraphic: The World of the Graphic Novel," which originated at the Norman Rockwell Museum in Stockbridge, Massachusetts.

Hempel has created advertising art for print and television as well as character design for HBO Animation. He has produced CD art for the Nashville band Swamp Rat, drawn an episode of the online strip Munden's Bar for ComicMix.com, illustrated a 21–page Escapist story for Dark Horse Comics, and contributed to Mad, Nickelodeon Magazine, and SpongeBob Comics.

== Awards ==
Marc Hempel received an Inkpot Award at San Diego Comic-Con in 1992.

== Bibliography ==
=== Apple Comics ===
- Blood of Dracula #1–2, 11 (1987–1989)

=== Art & Soul ===
- Tug & Buster #1–7 (1995–1998)

=== Comico Comics ===
- Jonny Quest #3, 10, 14–15, 17–18, 20, 22, 24–31 (1987–1988)

=== DC Comics ===
- Breathtaker #1–4 (1990)
- Dreaming #34, 50 (1999–2000)
- Flinch #5 (1999)
- Gregory #1–4 (1989–1993)
- The Invisibles #6 (1997)
- Lucifer #55 (2004)
- Mad #484, 493, 498, 500, 504, 506 (2007–2010)
- My Faith in Frankie #1–4 (2004)
- Re-Gifters graphic novel (2007)
- The Sandman #57–61, 63, 65–69 (1994–1995)
- Swamp Thing vol. 3 #13–16, 18 (2001)
- Who's Who in the DC Universe #9 (Vicki Vale) (1991)

=== Fantagraphics ===
- Anything Goes! #1 (1986)
- Honk #1–3 (1986–1987)

=== First Comics ===
- Mars #1–12 (1984–1985)

=== HM Communications ===
- Heavy Metal #v5#11, #v6#3, #v6#8 (1982)

=== Insight Studios Group ===
- Naked Brain #1–3 (2002)

=== Malibu Comics ===
- Tarzan the Warrior #1–5 (1992)

=== Marvel Comics ===
- Amazing High Adventure #3 (1986)
- Clive Barker's Hellraiser #20 (1993)
- Epic Illustrated #4, 16, 31 (1980–1985)
- Marvel Fanfare #27 (Spider-Man) (1986)

=== WaRP Graphics ===
- Blood of the Innocent #1–4 (1986)
- Warp Graphics Annual #1 (1986)

Preceded by Gary Amaro	The Sandman penciller 1994–1995	Succeeded by Michael Zulli
