= Mark Wheatley (comics) =

American cartoonist

- Born: May 27, 1954 (age 72)
- Areas: Writer, Penciller, Inker, Editor, Publisher, Colourist
- Notable works: Breathtaker, Mars, Blood of the Innocent
- Awards: Inkpot Award, 1992; Speakeasy Award, Mucker Award

Mark Wheatley (born May 27, 1954) is an American illustrator, writer, editor, and publisher in the comic book field. Wheatley's comic book and pulp creations include Breathtaker, Mars, and Blood of the Innocent, all illustrated with his frequent collaborator Marc Hempel. Wheatley has written books, comic books, and television shows, and his illustrations have appeared in magazines, books, comic books, and games.

== Biography ==
Wheatley came from the world of fandom, having published fanzines in the early 1970s.

=== Insight Studios ===
In 1978, Wheatley founded the Baltimore-based Insight Studios as a design, illustration, and art production studio; he was joined by Marc Hempel in 1980. Since then, Insight has expanded into publishing and has become home for many notable creators, including Frank Cho.

Wheatley has worked as an editor and art director for a number of publishers. He is also the inventor of an early digital color separation technology for comics.

In 2022, Wheatley and Hempel discovered that original artwork had been stolen from an Insight Studios warehouse. The suspected thief died in 2015, and the artwork was sold by his estate to private collectors; the theft was realized in 2022 when art began going up for sale online. As of 2026, Wheatley and Hempel are still trying to get the stolen art returned.

== Film and television ==
Breck Eisner is set to direct the upcoming Hollywood film adaptation of Blood of the Innocent, a comic book series Wheatley co-created with Rickey Shanklin and Marc Hempel. Inferno Entertainment has acquired underlying rights to the series and is funding development and production of the feature, which is being co-produced with Circle of Confusion.

== Awards ==
Wheatley has won the Inkpot, Speakeasy, and Mucker awards, and has been nominated for the Harvey and Ignatz awards.

== Bibliography ==
=== Writer ===
- Mars (First Comics, 1984–1985)
- Blood of the Innocent (WaRP Graphics, 1985)
- Breathtaker (DC Comics, 1990)
- Black Hood (DC/Impact Comics, 1991–1992)
- Radical Dreamer (Black Ball Comics, 1994; Mark's Giant Economy Size Comics!, 1995)
- Argus (DC Comics, 1995)
- Titanic Tales (Insight Studios, 1998)
- Jimgrim and the Devil at Ludd (Insight Studios, 1999)
- Hammer of the Gods (co-written with Michael Avon Oeming; Insight Studios, 2001)
- Frankenstein Mobster (Image Comics, 2003)

=== Artist ===
- Be An Interplanetary Spy (Byron Preiss Visual Publications/Bantam Books)
  - Find the Kirillian (1983; story by Seth McEvoy; art by Marc Hempel and Wheatley)
  - The Galactic Pirate (1983; story by McEvoy; art by Hempel and Wheatley)
  - Robot World (1983; story by McEvoy; art by Hempel and Wheatley)
  - Monsters of Doorna (1983; story by McEvoy; art by Hempel and Wheatley)
- Jonny Quest (Comico, 1986–1988)
- Blood of Dracula (Apple Comics, 1987–1988; also editor, 1987–1991)
- 9/11: Emergency Relief (Alternative Comics, 2002)
- 1001 Nights of Snowfall (DC/Vertgo, 2006)
