= Illustrated fiction =

Narrative medium

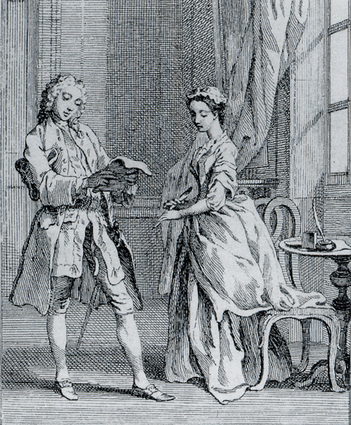
A plate from the 1742 deluxe edition of Samuel Richardson's Pamela, or, Virtue Rewarded.

Illustrated fiction is a hybrid narrative medium in which images and text work together to tell a story. It can take various forms, including fiction written for adults or children, magazine fiction, comic strips, and picture books.

== 18th century ==
Apart from an occasional portrait or map, 18th century fiction was not usually illustrated, as publishers did not commission illustrations for new novels. In the novel The History of Tom Jones, a Foundling, the author Henry Fielding refers to paintings by William Hogarth in order to explain what some of his characters look like.

Illustrations were commissioned for already successful books. These illustrated versions were usually published as limited editions and sold through prior subscription. Henry Fuseli created a single frontispiece for the fourth edition of Tobias Smollett's The Adventures of Peregrine Pickle. Thomas Stothard provided several illustrations for an edition of The Vicar of Wakefield published 30 years after its first publication in 1766.

Near the end of the 18th century, new mechanical techniques allowed pictures to be printed cheaply. Illustrated classics became cheaply available, and were strongly remembered by their readers. John Ruskin was moved by illustrations of Robinson Crusoe crashing into rocks and escaping his wreck. Charles Dickens remembered the illustrations in many books more than the prose itself.

== 19th century ==
At the beginning of the 19th century, illustration increased the sales of previously published fiction. In 1836, the publication of Charles Dickens's The Pickwick Papers in an illustrated serialized format revolutionised the publication of new fiction. The popularity of the original illustrations in Dickens's novels was unprecedented, and helped to popularize the use of illustrations in serious fiction. This revolution lasted until 1870, as other authors and publishers attempted to emulate Dickens's success. Illustrations became common in the period. For publishers, new fiction with illustrations published serially was less of a commercial risk than the traditional unillustrated three-volume sets. Illustrations attracted readers and increased advertising revenue. Illustrations were used as advertisement's in booksellers windows.

During the 19th century, the use of photomechanical techniques decreased the cost of reproducing illustrations. Both colour and black and white illustrations were increasingly used in daily, weekly, and monthly publications. Publishers sold a great deal of one-volume hardcovers and periodical serials.

Dickens's novels were well-suited to graphic representation. Dickens believed that the drawings that illustrated his fiction were valuable, despite some critics urging him not to use them. Most of his major works were originally published with illustrations. He was intensely involved in the creation of most of the 900 original illustrations of his writing. These illustrations were produced by 18 artists, including George Cruikshank and Robert Seymour.

Most of William Ainsworth's, Charles Lever's, William Thackeray's, and Anthony Trollope's major works were initially published in illustrated monthly parts. Later, novelists preferred to publish their writing in illustrated magazines. Thomas Hardy often did this. George Meredith did this twice, and George Eliot once. 19th century author artists included William Makepeace Thackeray and George du Maurier.

Many artists began their careers illustrating fiction. Illustrating was a difficult and badly paid job. Hablot Knight Browne was one of the few very talented artists to pursue illustrating full-time. Most artists, such as Marcus Stone and Luke Fildes, used illustrating as a stepping-stone to a career in painting. Other artists like George Cattermole and Daniel Maclise supplemented their income by providing illustrations.

The popularity of illustrated fiction began to decline in the late 19th century, as illustrations lost their novelty and no longer guaranteed that a novel would sell well. Technological improvements in printing flooded the market with affordable novels with illustrations of high quality. Prestigious artists including John Everett Millais, Dante Gabriel Rossetti, Edward Burne-Jones, and Frederick Leighton started to illustrate books. Illustrations challenged the novel's prose, implying a failure in prose's self-sufficiency. Prose frequently took second place to illustration.

== 20th century ==
The amount of illustrated fiction that was published declined from the beginning of the 20th century to the 1930s. By the 1930s, illustrations were rarely used in adult's novels. Illustrated serious fiction was not popular over the rest of the century. The decline in the publication of serials, rise in labour costs, and competition from film, television, and photojournalism contributed to its decline. There was also less demand from readers. Historians of Western illustrated fiction mostly agree that film replaced the illustrated book. A review of the 1915 film adaptation of Vanity Fair said that "the reels make a set of illustrations superior to the conventional pen-pictures of a deluxe edition."

Modern literary fiction was often not well-suited to illustration, for example the introspective novels of E. M. Forster and Virginia Woolf. Illustrations were used on book covers to attract buyers, but not used within the novel. Similar to the period before 1836, illustrations were not commissioned for new books, but were commissioned for established classics, usually for a limited luxury edition. Serious novels are not illustrated, and illustrated fiction is generally associated with serialized or short fiction that is published in popular but not intellectually prestigious magazines. Children and comics readers became the only fiction readers whose fiction was generally illustrated.

Some authors were concerned that illustrations would date or misinterpret their prose. Henry James disliked illustrations, claiming that illustrations were not needed because prose was sufficiently pictorial. He thought that illustrations and prose were in competition with one another. He permitted his travel books, but not his mature fiction, to be illustrated. Alvin Langdon Coburn's photographs were used in the New York edition of his works only as frontispieces, and only after James reassured himself that they did not compete or make a reference to his prose. Similar to James, Thomas Hardy increasingly excluded illustrations from the collected editions of his novels, with the exception of maps that he had drawn and photographic frontispieces.

None of the first or standard editions of James Joyce's novels were illustrated during his lifetime, except for an edition of Ulysses published by the Limited Editions Club in 1935, which included drawings and etchings by Henri Matisse. Pearl Buck's husband Richard J. Walsh, as editor of Asia, included illustrations with Buck's work that was published there in serial or complete form. However, as editor and later president of the John Day Company, he did not include illustrations in the subsequent hardcover editions of these novels. When Ernest Hemingway's novella The Old Man and the Sea was first published in Life magazine in 1952, it was illustrated with blue-tinted drawings by Noel Sickles. These illustrations were not included in its first publication in volume form, published by Charles Scribner's Sons.

In the middle of the 20th century, the comic strip used visual images to convey action and had a great influence on children and young people. Comic books have unique storytelling potential.

== See also ==
- Comic book
- Graphic novel
- Manga
- Victorian literature
