= Chooseco =

American publishing company

Chooseco LLC
- Type: Private
- Industry: Publishing
- Founded: 2003; 23 years ago
- Founders: R. A. Montgomery; Shannon Gilligan
- Headquarters: Waitsfield, Vermont, U.S.
- Key people: Shannon Gilligan (CEO)
- Products: Choose Your Own Adventure
- Website: cyoa.com

Chooseco LLC is an American publishing company based in Waitsfield, Vermont. Founded in 2003 by author R. A. Montgomery and publisher Shannon Gilligan, the company primarily releases reissues of Montgomery's Choose Your Own Adventure series of gamebooks.

== History ==
Montgomery had approached Bantam Books in the 1970s with his idea for "Choose Your Own Adventure" novels based upon a concept created by Edward Packard and originally published by Constance Cappel's and R. A. Montgomery's Vermont Crossroads Press as the "Adventures of You" series, starting with Packard's Sugarcane Island in 1976. The initial books were popular, and the series took off with additional authors, with publication between 1978 and 1998, with over two hundred fifty million books sold in thirty-eight languages. In 2003, Montgomery and his wife Shannon Gilligan opted to form Chooseco to republish some of the classic titles of the series, create new titles, and option the franchise for other media.

== Lawsuits ==
In March 2007, Chooseco filed a lawsuit against car manufacturer DaimlerChrysler, claiming that the company's advertising campaign for their Jeep Patriot model, bearing the tagline "Choose Your Adventure", infringed on Chooseco's trademarks. The suit was ultimately settled.

Chooseco filed a similar trademark lawsuit in January 2019 against movie streaming platform Netflix following the release of Black Mirror: Bandersnatch, an interactive film produced and released by Netflix that uses the "choose your own adventure" phrase. The company has also sent cease and desist notices to developers of indie video games on the itch.io storefront for using the term "choose your own adventure" to describe their game.

Netflix responded to Chooseco's suit with a number of defenses, including the assertion that the use of the term was artistic expression protected by the First Amendment (see Rogers v. Grimaldi), and a request for Chooseco's trademark "Choose Your Own Adventure" to be cancelled on the basis that it had become genericised. Netflix later conceded on the case and settled with Chooseco on undisclosed terms in November 2020.
