= Douglas Terman =

American novelist (1933–1999)

Douglas Terman (December 4, 1933 – December 28, 1999) was an American writer of military novels.

== Biography ==
He helped develop Petit Saint Vincent as an exclusive resort in the Grenadines with his best friend Hazen Richardson, travelling through the Caribbean on his boats Encantada and Jacinta.

He spent over twenty years in Warren, Vermont, where he met and befriended many fellow authors, including R. A. Montgomery, Edward Packard, Richard Bach, and Ward Just.

Terman was the author of one of the early Choose Your Own Adventure books, By Balloon to the Sahara. The book is dedicated to his only child, Christine M. Terman. Terman is also notable for his other military-themed fiction. He wrote from his own experiences, and included many of his friends and loved ones as characters in his books, such as "Walrus".

Terman had military experience during the Cuban Missile Crisis.

== Books by Douglas Terman ==
- The 3 Megaton Gamble (1978)
- By Balloon to the Sahara (1979) (reissued as Danger in the Desert).
- First Strike (1979)
- Free Flight (1980)
- Shell Game (1985)
- The Dragon Dances With The Tears Of 1am (1987)
- Enemy Territory (1989)
- Star Shot (1990)
- Cormorant (1994)
