= Jonathan Joss =

American actor and musician (1965–2025)

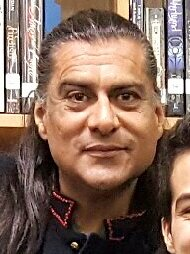
- Joss in 2017
- Born: Jonathan Joss Gonzales; December 22, 1965; San Antonio, Texas, U.S.
- Died: June 1, 2025 (aged 59); San Antonio, Texas, U.S.
- Cause of death: Gunshot wound
- Education: Our Lady of the Lake University; San Antonio College
- Occupations: Actor; musician
- Years active: 1993–2025
- Spouse: Tristan Kern de Gonzales (m. 2025)
- Musical career
- Genre: Blues
- Instruments: Guitar; vocals
- Member of: The Red Corn Band

Jonathan Joss Gonzales (December 22, 1965 – June 1, 2025) was an American actor and musician of Native American ancestry. He played Chief Ken Hotate in Parks and Recreation and was the voice of John Redcorn in King of the Hill.

== Early life, family and education ==
Joss was born on December 22, 1965, in San Antonio, Texas, to a family of Comanche and White Mountain Apache descent. His parents owned and operated a Mexican restaurant.

Joss attended McCollum High School, graduating in 1984. He enrolled at Texas State University–San Marcos (then Southwest Texas State University), but he did not graduate. He later attended San Antonio College, then graduated from Our Lady of the Lake University with a degree in theater and speech.

== Career ==
In 1994, he appeared on the television series Walker, Texas Ranger. Joss provided the voice of John Redcorn from seasons 2 to 13 of the animated series King of the Hill, replacing the original actor Victor Aaron after Aaron's death in 1996. He also portrayed the recurring role of Chief Ken Hotate in Parks and Recreation.

Joss was a musician, and performed as part of The Red Corn Band, a reference to the character he voiced in King of the Hill. In later seasons, inspired by Joss's offscreen performances, writers for King of the Hill introduced the fictional band Big Mountain Fudgecake, which Joss's character leads. He collaborated with the Graywolf Blues Band on the songs "Boogey Man" and "Still No Good", which were released on Graywolf Blues Band's album Dancing in the Rain.

In 2011, Joss launched a line of spice rubs.

Before his death in June 2025, Joss returned for the King of the Hill revival series and had begun recording. On June 1, just hours before his death, he uploaded an Instagram video of himself walking around Austin and noting how he already recorded lines for four King of the Hill episodes.

At the time of his death, he was writing a Western graphic novel titled Two Sides to Every Coin. New King of the Hill episodes where Joss reprised his role of John Redcorn were aired on Hulu on August 4, 2025.

== Final months ==
=== House fire ===
On January 23, 2025, Joss's San Antonio home was destroyed in a fire. It had earlier been vandalized, and electrical problems led Joss and his husband to stay in a hotel. Joss says he was using a propane heater and had left the house. "Mistakes happen, man. And it's my fault for, I guess, leaving something on", Joss said. "Or if somebody came in and did something, who knows?"

Joss married Tristan Kern de Gonzales on February 14, 2025.

Joss was not invited to the King of the Hill panel featuring other cast members from the show during the 2025 ATX TV Festival in Austin, Texas. In a Facebook post that was later deleted, he said he was not invited to attend. However, he showed up in the audience instead. Joss got up to a microphone setup for a Q&A session whereupon he told the audience that his house had burned down and that it was "because I'm gay". Afterward, he was escorted out by security.

A day before his death, Joss appeared on a King of the Hill fan podcast and answered questions. When asked whether he was sober, his reply was "No... I've already lost everything, my house burnt down. I ain't going to give up drugs. I ain't going to give up drinking. They're my friends." He also revealed on the podcast that he had spent time in mental wards.

=== Police complaints and killing ===
Despite years of calls to the city of San Antonio and 311 by neighbors concerned by an ongoing and intensifying feud between Joss and neighbor Sigfredo Ceja Alvarez, as well as Joss's frequently exhibited aggressive behavior in the neighborhood, residents stated that police had done little. In total, police were called to Joss's home 74 times from January 2024 to June 2025. The reasons for the calls included complaints by neighbors about fires, thefts, nine calls regarding shootings, six calls for mental health, and five calls for welfare checks. One neighbor told KSAT 12 News that her family and other neighbors had had tense conversations with Joss for decades, that he would frequently yell and make strange statements, like that his neighbors were going to go to hell because they're sinners and God is on his side, or that all the children on his street were going to die. Other neighbors also reported that Joss's behavior was erratic, and that he sometimes appeared outside in the street while yelling.

On June 1, 2025, Joss and his husband, Tristan Kern de Gonzales, were driven by a woman to their burned-down home to check the mail. Half an hour before his death, Joss was recorded by a neighbor holding a pitchfork walking up and down the street yelling. A neighbor told KSAT that a vehicle pulled up alongside the men and Joss spoke with the driver. A confrontation occurred between Joss and Ceja Alvarez, with whom Joss had been feuding. A witness reported hearing three gunshots and seeing Joss with wounds to his neck and torso. He was pronounced dead at the scene. Ceja Alvarez was arrested shortly afterward and reportedly told police, "I shot him", after being taken into custody.

Neighbors told a local television station that Joss and Ceja Alvarez had often argued for several years, but that no violence had previously occurred. A previous incident on June 8, 2024, resulted in Ceja Alvarez calling police, saying Joss was brandishing a crossbow. On May 24, 2024, reports of gunfire resulted in police confiscating Joss's firearms.

Gonzales posted on Facebook that the day they returned to their burned house, they found the harness of one of their dogs, leading to "severe emotional distress". Gonzales said Ceja Alvarez yelled "violent homophobic slurs" before opening fire and that Joss pushed Gonzales out of the bullet's path, saving his life. Gonzales said neither he nor Joss was armed. Additionally, Gonzales said that various people in the area had for years verbally assaulted them with homophobic slurs and threats to burn down their home. Gonzales described the attack as a homophobic hate crime, stating that Ceja Alvarez "started yelling violent homophobic slurs at us. He then raised a gun from his lap and fired."

The San Antonio Police Department (SAPD) released an initial statement saying that no evidence of a hate crime had yet been found but that the investigation was still ongoing, although they later retracted this statement, dubbing it "premature". According to Gonzales, the couple had reported homophobic harassment "to law enforcement multiple times and nothing was done". The SAPD also confirmed that Joss had been a part of neighborhood conflicts and that the police mental health unit had made "repeated efforts to mediate conflicts and connect him with services that he may have needed".

On November 17, 2025, Ceja Alvarez was indicted by a grand jury for the murder of Joss. The trial is scheduled to begin on May 10, 2027.

== Filmography ==
=== Film ===
Year	Title	Role	Notes
1994	8 Seconds	Medic Del Rio	
1994	Texas	Commanche	
1998	Almost Heroes	Bent Twig	
1998	Pocahontas II: Journey to a New World	Additional voices	Direct-to-video
1999	Impala	John Eagle Claw	
2001	Christmas in the Clouds	Phil	
2004	Johnson Family Vacation	Casino Host	
2010	True Grit	His Tongue in the Rain	
2016	The Magnificent Seven	Denali	
2021	Grow Up	Judge Robert Lightfoot	
2021	The Forever Purge	American Indian on TV	

=== Television ===
Year	Title	Role	Notes
1994	The Substitute Wife	Black Deer	Television film
1994	Without Consent	Attendant No. 2	Television film
1994	Walker, Texas Ranger	Young Raymond Firewalker	6 episodes
1994	Texas	Comanche	Television film
1996	Dead Man's Walk	Kicking Wolf	Miniseries
1997–2009, 2025–2026	King of the Hill	John Redcorn (voice)	Main cast; recorded four episodes for season 14 and one for season 15. The final episode of season 14 was dedicated to Joss’s memory.
1998	Winnetous Rückkehr	Wash-Ti	Television film
1999	The Wild Thornberrys	Ooloopie, Polar Bears (voice)	Episode: "Polar Opposites"
2003	Charmed	Brutish Demon	Episode: "Baby's First Demon"
2004	ER	Bert	Episode: "Time of Death"
2005	Justice League Unlimited	Sheriff Ohiyesa 'Pow Wow' Smith (voice)	Episode: "The Once and Future Thing, Part One: Weird Western Tales"
2005	Into the West	Wovoka	Episode: "Ghost Dance"
2006	Maldonne	Nico	Television film
2008	Comanche Moon	Kicking Wolf	2 episodes
2008	In Plain Sight	Joseph Parker	Episode: "Pilot"
2010	Friday Night Lights	Owney	Episode: "Kingdom"
2014	The League	Takoda	Episode: "Man Land"
2014	Manhattan Love Story	Driver	Episode: "Happy Thankmas"
2011–2015	Parks and Recreation	Ken Hotate	5 episodes
2015	The Messengers	Mason Dakota	Episode: "Eye in the Sky"
2016	Ray Donovan	Lou	3 episodes
2019	Chartered	George Herrera	Pilot
2021	Bridgewater	Joseph Hoskins	Podcast series
2022	Tulsa King	Bad Face	2 episodes

=== Video games ===
Year	Title	Voice role	Notes
1996	Santa Fe Mysteries: The Elk Moon Murder	Raymond Wolfwalker	
1997	Santa Fe Mysteries: Sacred Ground	Richard Whitefeather	
2000	King of the Hill	John Redcorn	
2010	Trauma Team	Hank Freebird	
2010	Red Dead Redemption	The Local Population	
2016	The Walking Dead: Michonne	John Fairbanks	
2019	Days Gone	Alkai Turner	
2020	Wasteland 3	Payaso Wannabe	
2023	Cyberpunk 2077: Phantom Liberty	Robert Rainwater	

== Discography ==
- Red Corn Sessions (2004)
- Still No Good (2006)
