= Black Mirror: Bandersnatch =

2018 interactive film by David Slade

Bandersnatch
- Release poster
- Directed by: David Slade
- Written by: Charlie Brooker
- Produced by: Russell McLean
- Starring: Fionn Whitehead; Craig Parkinson; Alice Lowe; Asim Chaudhry; Will Poulter
- Cinematography: Aaron Morton; Jake Polonsky
- Edited by: Tony Kearns
- Music by: Brian Reitzell
- Production companies: House of Tomorrow; Netflix
- Distributed by: Netflix
- Release date: 28 December 2018
- Running time: Variable; Default: 90 minutes; Total: 312 minutes
- Country: United Kingdom
- Language: English

Black Mirror: Bandersnatch was a 2018 interactive film in the science fiction anthology series Black Mirror. It was written by series creator Charlie Brooker and directed by David Slade. The film premiered on Netflix on 28 December 2018, its release date only officially announced the day before.

In Bandersnatch, viewers make decisions for the main character, the young programmer Stefan Butler (Fionn Whitehead), who is adapting a fantasy gamebook into a video game in 1984. Other characters include Mohan Thakur (Asim Chaudhry) and Colin Ritman (Will Poulter), who work at a video game company; Stefan's father, Peter (Craig Parkinson); and Stefan's therapist, Dr. Haynes (Alice Lowe). A postmodernist work with free will as a central theme, the film was named after a real video game planned for release by Imagine Software in 1984, the game in turn named after the bandersnatch, a creature of Lewis Carroll's creation.

Brooker and executive producer Annabel Jones were approached by Netflix about making an interactive film in May 2017, during which time Netflix had several such projects for children underway. Difficulty in writing the highly non-linear script led to Netflix's creation of a bespoke program called Branch Manager; the unique nature of the content required adaptations in the platform's use of cache memory. Bandersnatch was originally to be part of Black Mirror's fifth series, but its lengthy production led to its release as a standalone film, delaying the fifth series to June 2019.

Critics praised the technical design of the film but criticised the story's characterisation. There was mixed commentary about the narrative and the extent to which viewer choices affected the story. The film received average rankings in critics' lists of Black Mirror instalments by quality, but garnered numerous awards and nominations, winning two Primetime Emmy Awards. A follow-up episode, "Plaything", set in the same universe as Bandersnatch and featuring Poulter and Chaudhry reprising their roles, was released as part of the series' seventh season in 2025.

Bandersnatch was one of Netflix's early forays into interactive works, but by 2023, Netflix had shifted away from interactive media towards video games offered by the service with Netflix citing that the technology had served its purpose. Netflix delisted several of its interactive works by 2025 with the exception of Bandersnatch and Unbreakable Kimmy Schmidt: Kimmy vs the Reverend. Both of these were removed from Netflix in May 2025 as part of a major interface update.

== Synopsis ==
=== Format ===
Bandersnatch is an interactive film. A brief tutorial, specific to the device being streamed on, explains to the viewer how to make choices. (Note: Attempting to watch the film on an unsupported platform will result in a short video message using clips from earlier episodes of Black Mirror informing the viewer that their platform does not currently support interactive content on Netflix.) When presented with a choice point, the user has ten seconds to make a choice or a default decision is made for them. The average viewing is 90 minutes, though the quickest path ends after 40 minutes. There are 150 minutes of unique footage divided into 250 segments, yielding over one trillion possible paths that the viewer can take. In some cases, the same scene is reachable in multiple ways but will present the viewer with different choices based on the way they reached it. In other cases, certain loops guide viewers to a specific narrative regardless of the choices they make.

Netflix reported that there are five "main" endings, with variants within each ending; some endings are intercut with credits, similar to other Black Mirror episodes. Producer Russell McLean said there are between ten and twelve endings, some of which are more concrete than others, and according to director David Slade, there are a few "golden eggs" endings that are difficult to achieve. No ending is considered "prescribed" over any other, according to series creator Charlie Brooker and executive producer Annabel Jones, particularly as they felt some endings were not truly endings in the traditional sense. In most cases, when the viewer reaches an ending, the interactive film gives the player the option to redo a last critical choice in order to explore different content, sometimes with a fast-forward through early parts of a storyline already seen. Some endings may become impossible to reach based on choices made by the viewer unless they opt to restart the film.

=== Plot ===
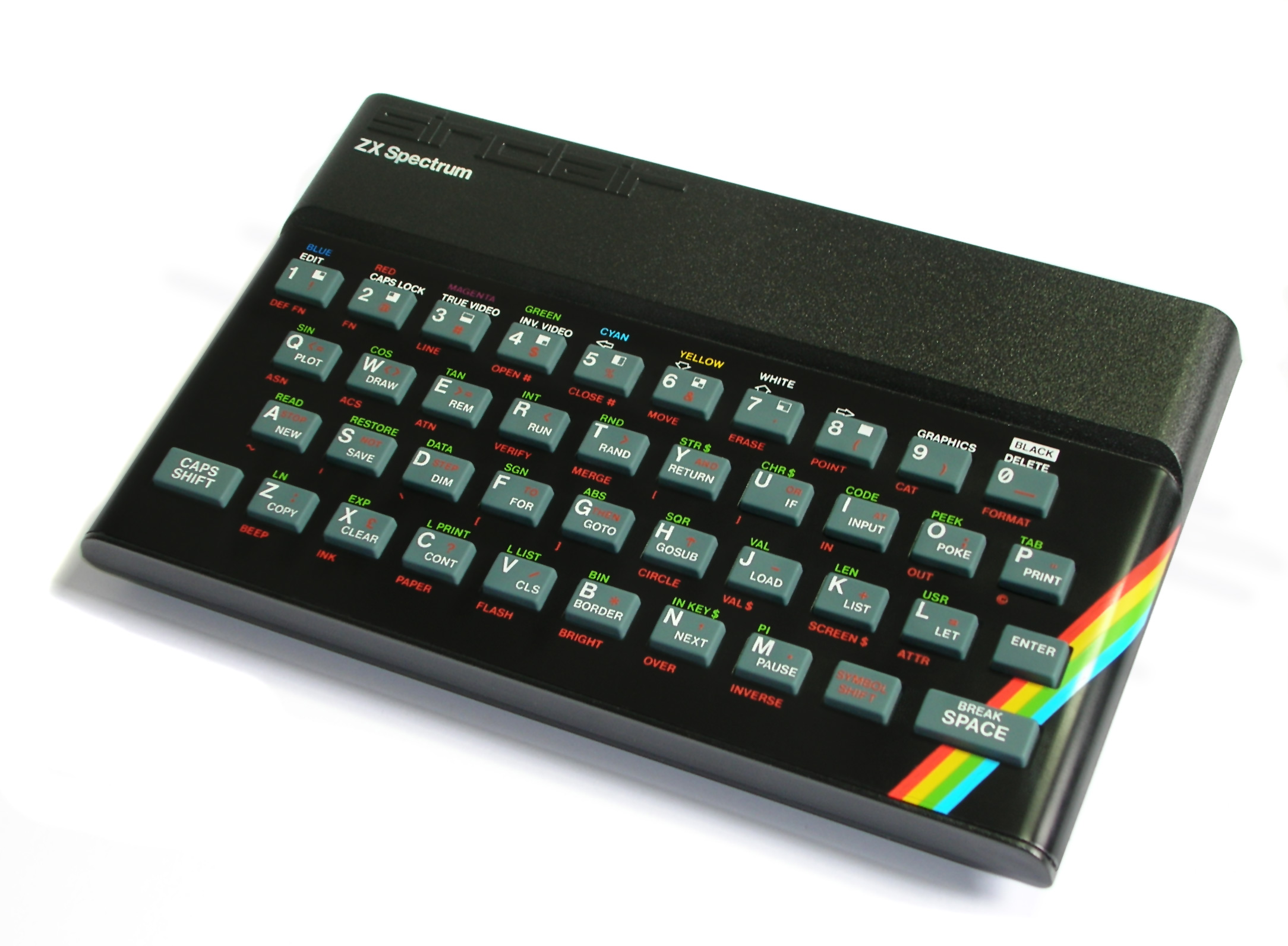
Stefan Butler uses a ZX Spectrum to program his game Bandersnatch.

In Britain in July 1984, a young programmer named Stefan Butler is adapting a "choose your own adventure" book owned by his late mother, Bandersnatch by Jerome F. Davies, into a revolutionary adventure game. Stefan pitches it to the video game company Tuckersoft, which is run by Mohan Thakur and employs the famous game creator Colin Ritman. Stefan is given the choice of accepting or rejecting help from the company in developing the game. If Stefan accepts, Colin says he chose the "wrong path". The game is released months later and critically panned as "designed by committee". Stefan considers trying again, and the film returns to the day of the offer, and the viewer is given the same choice.

Rejecting the offer, Stefan begins to work on the game on his own from his bedroom, given a September deadline. As the game becomes more complex, Stefan's life is torn between his career and his role, and he eventually becomes stressed and hostile to his father, Peter. He visits Dr. R. Haynes's clinic for therapy. The viewer may have Stefan explain to Dr. Haynes about his mother's death: when he was five, Peter confiscated his stuffed rabbit toy. His mother was delayed by Stefan's refusal to leave without the rabbit and the train she took derailed, killing her. Stefan feels responsible for her death. Dr. Haynes prescribes Stefan medicine, which the viewer can choose to have Stefan take or flush down the toilet.

The viewer may have Stefan accept an invitation to Colin's flat, where he lives with his girlfriend Kitty and infant daughter Pearl. The viewer is offered to take LSD with Colin or not; however, in the latter case Colin then spikes Stefan's tea with the drug. Colin rants about secret government mind-control programs and alternate timelines. To demonstrate his theories, Colin demands Stefan choose one of them to jump off the balcony. If Stefan jumps, he dies and the game is finished by Tuckersoft to poor reviews. If Colin jumps, the whole encounter is revealed to be a dream, but Colin is absent in future scenes and remembers the event in that dream.

As the deadline to deliver the game looms, Stefan begins to feel he is being controlled by outside forces. Stefan finds his life mirroring that of Davies, about whom he learns through a book and a documentary that Colin gives him. Like Davies, he sees recurring imagery of a "branching pathway" symbol, which seemingly led to Davies beheading his own wife. As he begins to mentally break down, the viewer has multiple options to explain to Stefan who has been controlling him, including the option for Stefan to be told that he is being watched on Netflix in the 21st century. The viewer may discover a locked safe that contains either Stefan's old toy rabbit or documents about him being monitored as part of an experiment.

There are numerous possible endings. Stefan may choose to confront his therapist, after which it may be revealed that he is on a film set and that his "dad" is a fellow actor. One set of choices leads to Stefan seemingly crossing through a mirror to his five-year-old self, and then choosing whether to "die" with his mother in the train crash, causing him to suddenly die in the present. In other paths, the viewer has the option to make Stefan kill his father, and then bury or chop up the body. Burying it leads to Stefan being jailed before the release of the game. Dismembering it leads to the successful release of the game, but Stefan goes to prison shortly after, and the game is recalled and destroyed. Other scenes show Mohan, Colin, or Kitty arriving at Stefan's house, sometimes with the option to kill the characters. In some endings, the viewer is shown the critical reaction to the Bandersnatch game and the fate of Tuckersoft, which may go out of business. One ending (chop up the body) concludes in the present day with an adult Pearl, now a programmer for Netflix, attempting to adapt Bandersnatch into an interactive film. The viewer chooses for her to pour tea over her computer or destroy it, which implies she may go down the same path Davies and Stefan did.

== Cast ==
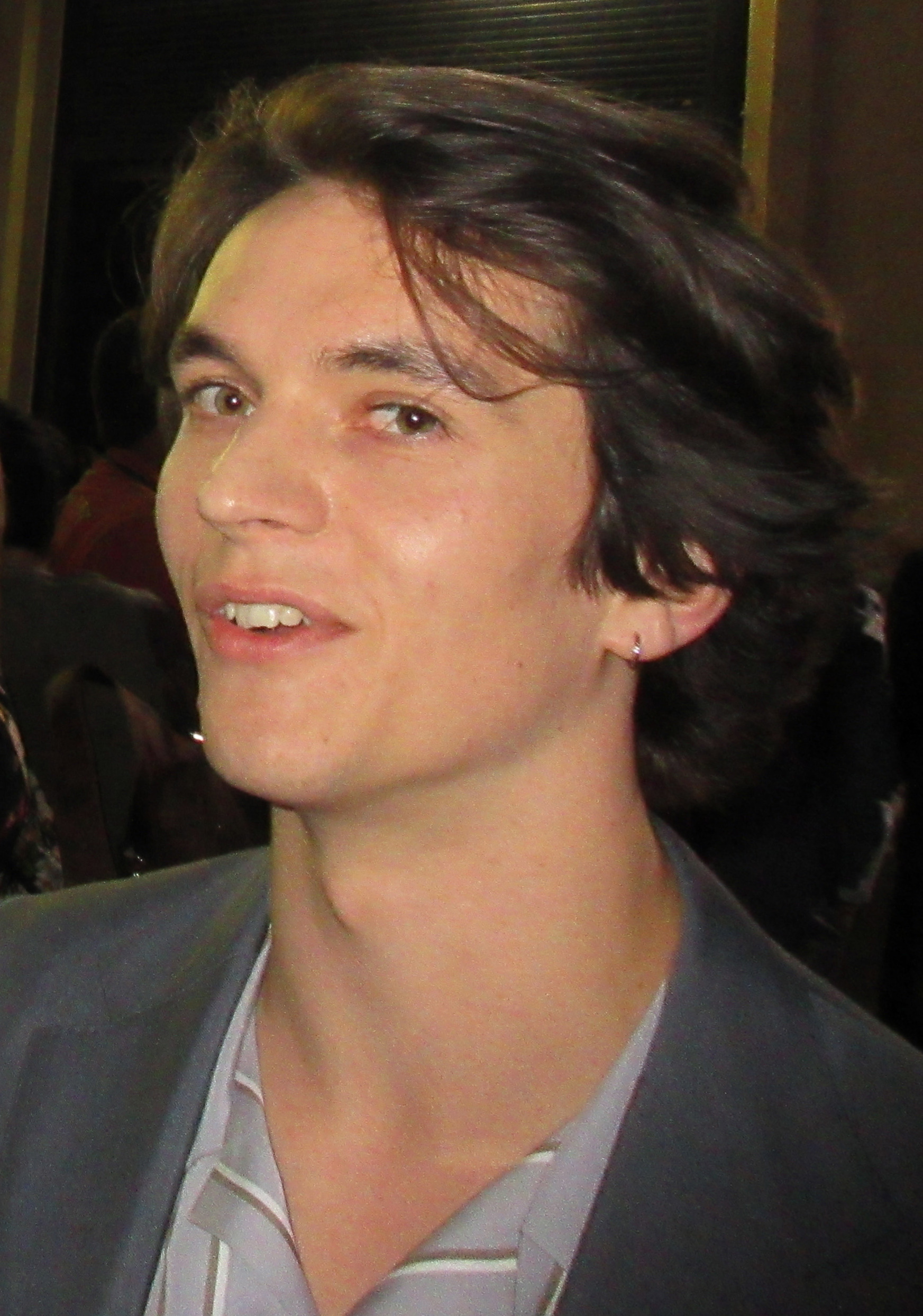
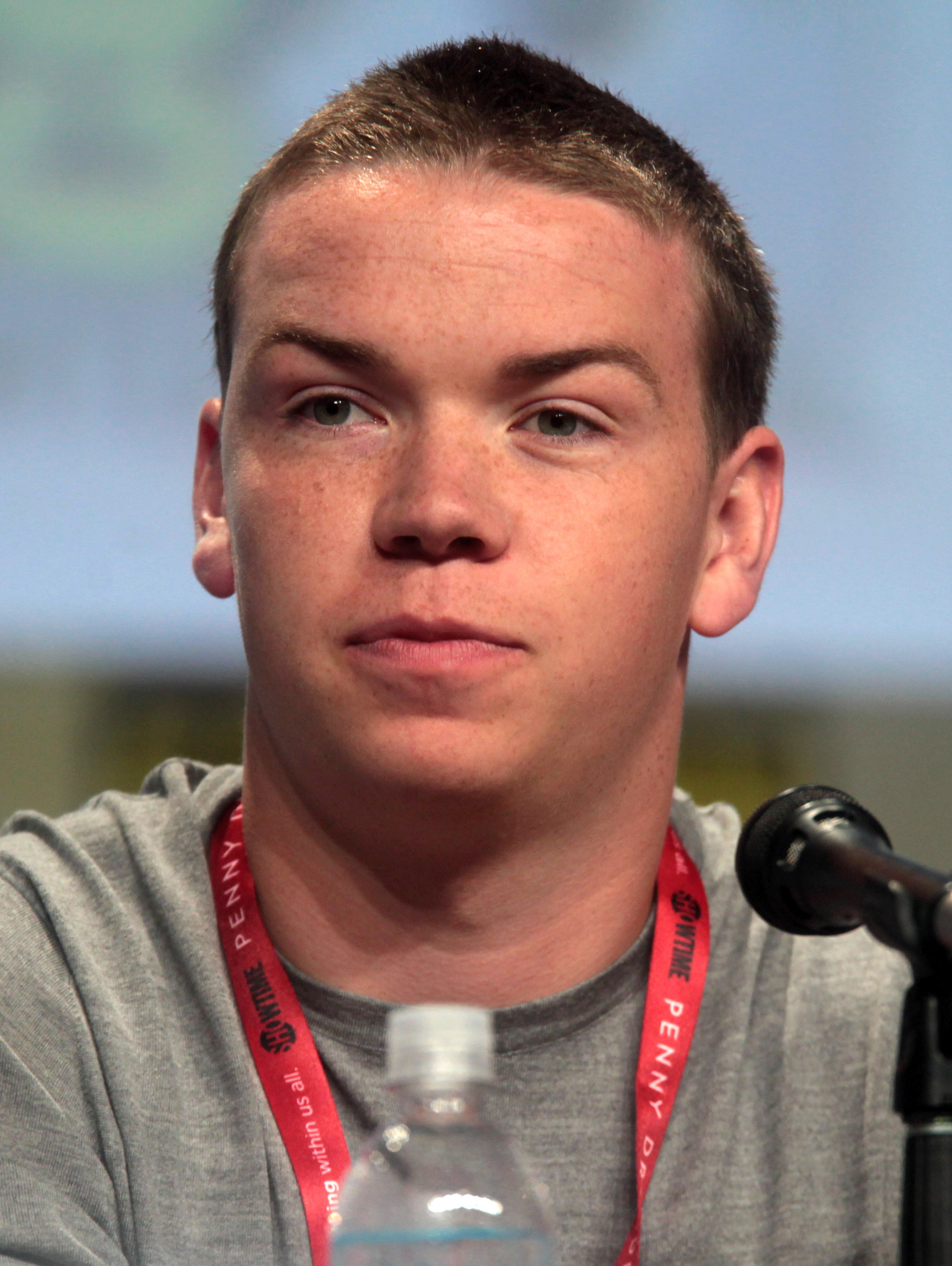
Fionn Whitehead (left) and Will Poulter (right)

Credits adapted from Screen Rant.

- Fionn Whitehead as Stefan Butler, a young programmer
- Will Poulter as Colin Ritman, an acclaimed game designer
- Asim Chaudhry as Mohan Thakur, the owner of Tuckersoft
- Craig Parkinson as Peter Butler, Stefan's father
- Alice Lowe as Dr. R. Haynes, a therapist
- Tallulah Haddon as Kitty, Colin's girlfriend
- Catriona Knox as Leslie, a video game review host
- Jonathan Aris as Crispin, a news reporter
- Paul M Bradley as Robin, a video game review critic
- Alan Asaad as Satpal, a Tuckersoft employee
- Suzanne Burden as Judith Mulligan, a documentary host
- Fleur Keith as Stefan's mother
- Laura Evelyn as Pearl Ritman, the child of Colin and Kitty
- Jeff Minter as Jerome F. Davies, author of Bandersnatch

== Production ==
Bandersnatch was released on Netflix on 28 December 2018 in 28 languages. It was originally intended to be an episode of series five, its scope changing to a standalone movie due to its complexity. Bandersnatch was made after one of the series five episodes was filmed. Brooker compared the effort spent on Bandersnatch to that of four regular Black Mirror episodes. As a consequence, the fifth season of Black Mirror was delayed, its three episodes premiering on 5 June 2019.

=== Conception and writing ===
The film was written by Charlie Brooker. He and Annabel Jones were approached by Netflix in May 2017 about making an interactive episode; their initial instinct was to reject the offer, particularly over concerns about the lack of seamless transitions from earlier interactive films. However, by the time of a script meeting a few weeks later to review potential ideas for the upcoming fifth series of Black Mirror, they had an idea for a plot that only worked as an interactive film. In it, a programmer would make a video game out of a choose-your-own-adventure book. Brooker had previously conceived of multiple endings for the third series episode "Playtest": a "nightmare mode" version of the episode, played when the viewer had seen the episode once before, would have ended with a much darker resolution.

Brooker initially envisaged the film as having one clear story, with a few different scenes at the end, until he had the idea of remembering earlier choices and incorporating them into later scenes. To keep the narrative focused with the numerous divergent endings, Brooker kept the story's core concept around the freedom of choice or the illusion of that freedom. Jones worked to develop believable characters that would fit with any of the film's possible endings. Discussions were had over the number of choices the viewer should make and how the film should be paced. The storylines and branches continued expanding into pre-production.

The flash-forward ending involving Pearl Ritman was expected to be the one most commonly reached. Brooker remarked that he found himself in a similar position as Pearl in trying to work himself through pages of complex decision trees while writing the script. Several of the paths lead the viewer towards the choice of having Butler kill his father, though the viewer can avoid this. However, not all endings can be reached without Butler killing his father. McLean stated that this was done to give the viewer the sense of having their own control over the narrative. Endings in which a reviewer gives a star rating to Bandersnatch were designed to encourage users to go back, though there is no way that, simultaneously, the game can get a good review and Stefan can have a happy ending.

=== Technical design ===
Brooker found a steep learning curve in the technology required to write the film's script. At Netflix's suggestion, Brooker wrote the 170-page script in Twine, a tool for writing interactive fiction, also using Scrivener, Final Draft and multiple versions of Microsoft Notepad. The basic structure of the film took the most time to write, and the script underwent seven different versions. As the first Netflix interactive content for adults, Bandersnatch required more complex choices than previous interactive works, leading Netflix staff to create a bespoke tool which they named Branch Manager. It only became available to Brooker a few months into the episode's development.

Brooker and the production considered how to present the choices to the player, initially considering GIF animation loops of the possible actions. Their initial designs confused test viewers, and they instead used text options, temporarily letterboxing the frame to make the choices clear. The lighting, sound design and aspect ratio of the film change while this takes place, designed to make the viewer feel pressure.

Streaming with seamless transitions from one scene to either of two choices requires the two subsequent scenes to be pre-cached, which meant that Bandersnatch could not be made available on some older devices, or Chromecast or Apple TV. To help viewers who may not be familiar with how adventure games work, the film includes an early, seemingly trivial choice of which breakfast cereal Stefan has. This not only shows the viewer how choices are presented during the film, but how their state is recalled by the Netflix app later in their viewing. In this case, the cereal selection informs a television advert in-movie. If no choices are selected, the film progresses by choices determined by Brooker to give the most basic version of the story.

=== Casting and filming ===
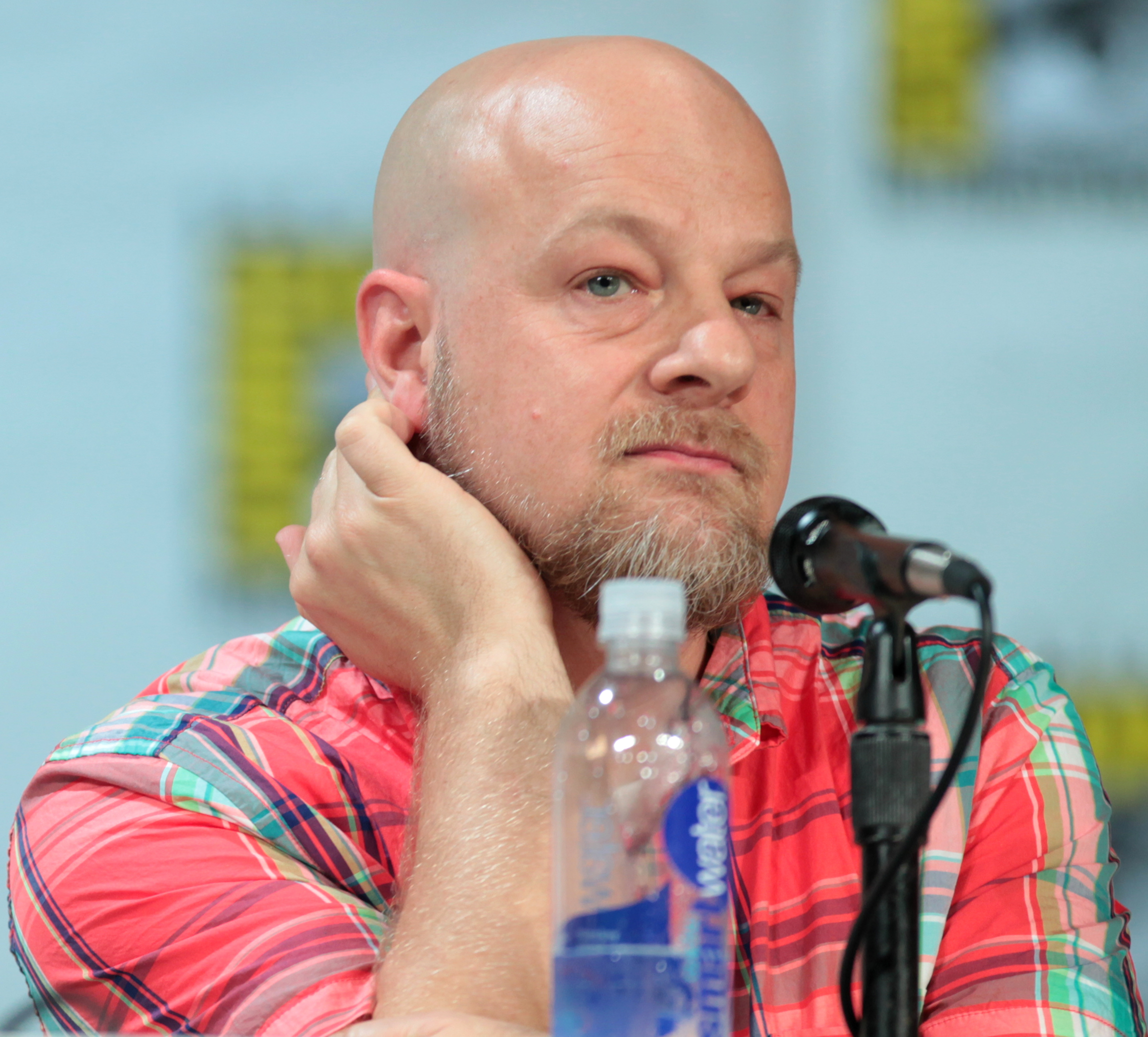
David Slade directed Bandersnatch

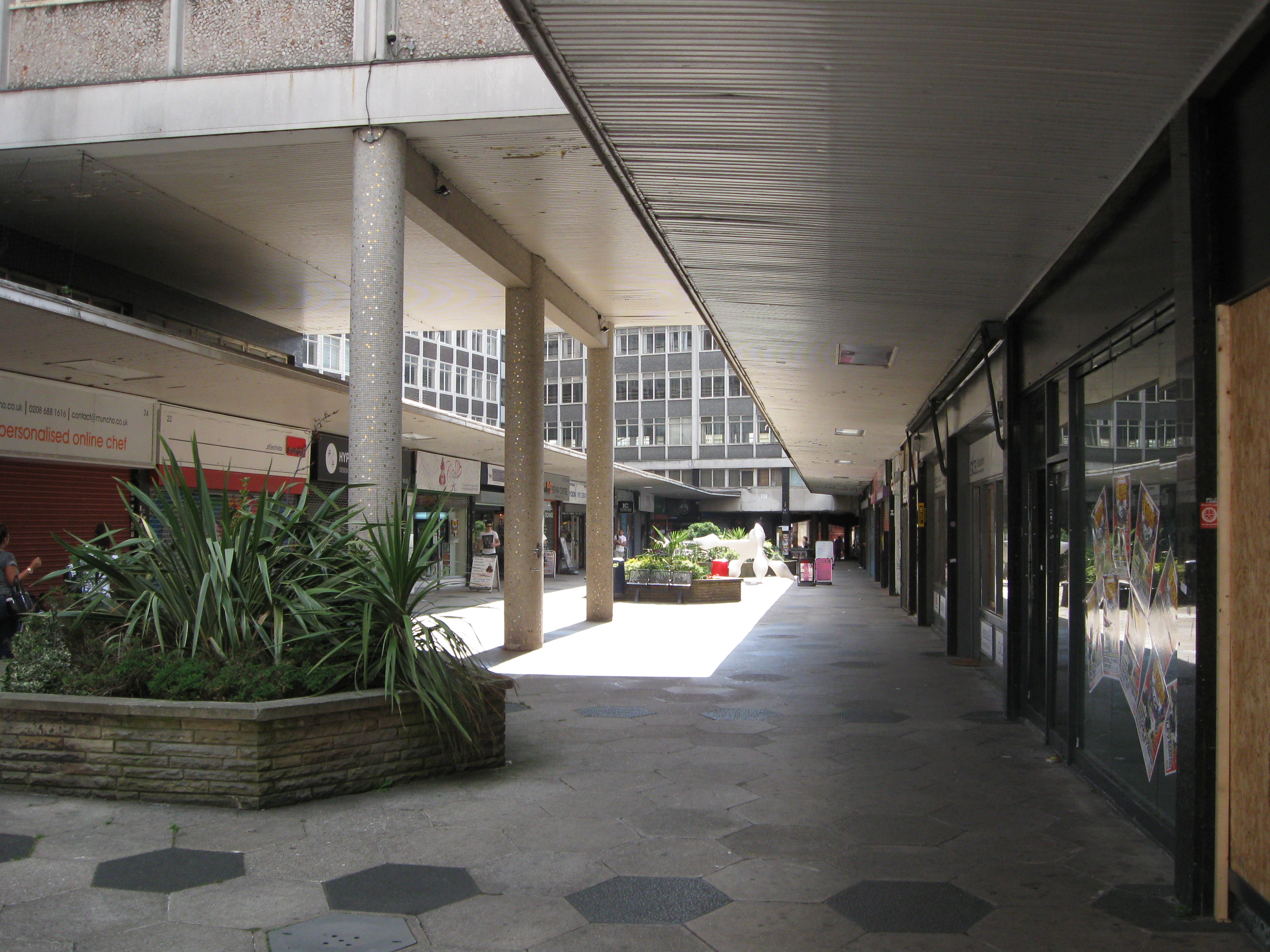
Some exterior scenes were filmed in St George's Walk, Croydon, London.

Bandersnatch was directed by David Slade, who previously directed series four episode "Metalhead". It starred Fionn Whitehead, Will Poulter, and Asim Chaudhry. Whitehead was only informed of the film's interactive nature after being offered the part. Davies was played by independent game developer Jeff Minter at Jones's suggestion, having previously appeared in a documentary made by Jones and Brooker. Some of Ritman's character was informed by Minter's own background. Writer Warren Ellis was also asked to portray Davies but could not commit to the open shooting schedule and travel that the show required.

Production took eight months, Netflix requiring assets to be locked in by the end of November 2018. The actors had two weeks to prepare, while filming lasted around 35 days, which was considerably longer than the average for a Black Mirror piece. Exterior filming took place at the shopping centre St George's Walk in Croydon, London, in April 2018. A flowchart was initially used on set but actors found it overcomplicated the situation. Whitehead and Poulter both compared the experience to theatre acting. Slade highlighted Colin as the hardest character to understand, as one scene needed to be shot three times, with Colin having different levels of knowledge at each stage. Slade told Poulter to focus not on how his character knew information, but simply that his character did know. Whitehead found it difficult to maintain his character's constant anxiety and tension.

Both Poulter and Chaudhry reprised their roles in the series 7 episode "Plaything".

=== Soundtrack ===
The soundtrack was composed by Brian Reitzell, who worked on it by writing separate scores for each of the major storylines, then filling in music for the scenes not already covered. Reitzell had previously worked on music for some video games, but had not worked on modular music of the same complexity, where music was required to sync up with choice point transitions. He aimed for the music to be tonally connected but not feel static or reused. Much of the musical equipment he used was from the 1980s, including video game sound chips and modified consoles. Music was required for the choice points, video games, flashbacks and recap fast-forwards within the film. Reitzell worked with Slade to make the soundtrack feel atmospheric. The film also uses many songs from the 1980s, including "Relax" by Frankie Goes to Hollywood, "O Superman" by Laurie Anderson and "Too Shy" by Kajagoogoo. The viewer has some choice over music played, including a decision between "Hold Me Now" by the Thompson Twins and "Here Comes the Rain Again" by the Eurythmics.

=== Unused content ===
Some ideas for the film went unused. At one point, trophies for unlocking scenes were considered, similar to Xbox achievements. Instead of a documentary on Jerome F Davies, it was conceived that Stefan could choose to watch an entire film with which viewers could interact. At a different point, Brooker wanted Stefan's father's blood to splatter across the viewer's cereal choice. A segment where the viewer enters the therapist's phone number was initially designed as a more difficult riddle, the codes "999" and "911" leading to alternate scenes of Stefan calling the police in the UK and US, respectively. Originally, Netflix meta-endings could only be unlocked after the first playthrough.

Whitehead reports that much more footage was shot than was used in the final version. The film features some scenes which viewers cannot access, as a result of late editing changes, including scenes being reordered. This is similar to video games, which often have unused content still stored in their files. One such scene was a third encounter between Stefan and Colin at the offices, in which Colin would start finishing Stefan's sentences; Brooker saw that at least one person had obtained the footage and shared it. Some material was cut from Bandersnatch, such as Stefan killing Colin with a knife, as the work was deemed to be violent enough already. Additionally cut was a scene from the same choice point which showed Stefan dropping the knife and embracing Colin.

== Marketing and release ==
- "Bandersnatch Featurette: Consumer"; Promotional video featuring Brooker, Jones, Whitehead and Poulter
- "Bandersnatch Featurette: Tech"; Promotional video featuring Brooker, Jones, Slade and production crew

On 27 December 2018, Netflix released a 90-second trailer for Bandersnatch, establishing that the film would premiere the following day, on 28 December. On 3 January 2019, Netflix released two "featurettes" which look behind the scenes at the film.

There was much media speculation prior to the film's announcement, spurred by news that Black Mirror had been renewed for a fifth series by March 2018. Early reports in April 2018, including by Digital Spy and on social media, said that filming for Black Mirror was occurring in Croydon, asserting it was for an episode titled Bandersnatch. Around the start of December 2018, it was widely reported that Twitter users had spotted a since-deleted tweet from an official Netflix account, with a list of premiere dates including 28 December for Black Mirror: Bandersnatch. The film was certified by the Korean and Dutch ratings board prior to its release, the former reporting that it was 5 hours and 12 minutes in length. On 19 December 2018, Netflix added the title Black Mirror: Bandersnatch as an upcoming film, with the tagline "Be right back", in reference to the earlier episode of the same name. Various runtimes including 2 minutes, 36 minutes and 90 minutes were listed in different territories. In late December, media reported on an image of the cast and a claim that Slade would direct the episode.

The interactive nature of Bandersnatch was first publicly mentioned by Bloomberg News in October 2018, which cited an unnamed source that Netflix was developing an interactive episode of Black Mirror alongside several other interactive specials for release in 2018. A Netflix spokesperson, when asked by The Verge, responded with: "Thanks for reaching out! You have the ability to choose your own response from Netflix: this or this." The first "this" contained a link to a GIF from Unbreakable Kimmy Schmidt of a character saying "razzmatazz", and the second linking to a YouTube video of crickets chirping. No screeners were sent to critics in advance of the film's release, though Netflix invited select media writers to their headquarters about a month prior to release and gave them an opportunity to try the interactive film.

Only upon the film's release on 28 December did Netflix publicly confirm its interactive nature. Carla Engelbrecht, Netflix's director of product innovation, told The Hollywood Reporter that they did not officially announce that Bandersnatch would be an interactive episode so that viewers would not have "preconceived notions", such as an overestimation of the level of interactivity. Due to unpleasant comments following the release of Bandersnatch, Poulter announced that he would reduce his Twitter activity for mental health reasons. In a November 2021 interview with GQ, Poulter stated that he deleted his Twitter account in January 2019 after being harassed by keyboard warriors who mocked his appearance as Ritman. Poulter returned to Twitter in 2021, but he now uses it for platform causes that he supports like The Black Curriculum and Alzheimer's Research UK.

A week following the film's premiere, Netflix sent out a hint on its social media pages directing users on how to discover an obscure scene. A week later, Netflix tweeted pieces of data about viewer choices in the episode. For instance, 73% of viewers chose for Stefan to initially accept the job at Tuckersoft and of what Netflix deemed to be the five endings, the least viewed was the one where Stefan boards the train with his mother as a child. Later, Netflix reported that 94% of viewers were actively making choices.

Following the release of Bandersnatch to Netflix, a live website for the fictional company Tuckersoft was made available. The site documented some of the fictional games discussed in the film and included a playable version of Nohzdyve that required the use of a ZX Spectrum computer or an emulator. The film was also advertised after its release on the London Underground. Within a week of its release, a number of mock "Tucker's Newsagent and Games" storefronts appeared in London and Birmingham, styled as a 1980s store with the various Tuckersoft games, and VHS tapes of other Black Mirror episodes.

== Netflix and interactive fiction ==
Netflix had previously released interactive programmes for children, starting in 2017 with Puss in Book. Netflix also released the 2015 Telltale Games interactive series Minecraft: Story Mode on their website in November 2018. Bandersnatch was their first release targeted at adults. Netflix went on to produce additional shows using the Branch Manager tool. Bear Grylls's eight-episode interactive reality series You vs. Wild, fashioned after Man vs. Wild, was released in April 2019. An interactive special for the comedy Unbreakable Kimmy Schmidt, Kimmy vs the Reverend, was released in May 2020.

The Verge's Jesse Damiani commented that interactivity as in Bandersnatch could potentially be used by Netflix to collect user-preference data and inform marketing choices, such as targeted product placement. In February, technology policy researcher Michael Veale requested the data that Netflix stored about his viewings of Bandersnatch under the General Data Protection Regulation. He criticised that the data, detailing every choice he had made, was not anonymised and was taken without explicit consent from the user. A 2019 paper by researchers at the Indian Institute of Technology Madras demonstrated how to infer viewers' choices in Bandersnatch through network packet analysis with 96% accuracy. The paper noted that this could be used to reveal viewer preferences "from benign (e.g., their food and music preferences) to sensitive (e.g., their affinity to violence and political inclination)", and noted a technical solution Netflix could implement.

As Netflix moved into more traditional gaming markets in the early 2020s, the company’s development and output of interactive programmes slowed, with then-vice president of Netflix Games Mike Verdu stating in an interview in December 2023 that “the technology was very limiting and the potential for what we could do in that realm was kind of capped” and said that Netflix were “not building those specific experiences anymore”. Netflix later announced on 4 November 2024 that they would be removing most of their interactive programmes from the service the following month, though Bandersnatch would be one of the four interactive programmes that remained on the service. Game designer Sam Barlow, who had developed video games with full-motion video previously, said that Bandersnatch only worked as its story worked at a metafiction level with the nature of interactive works, a formula that couldn't easily be replicated in Netflix's future works. Ahead of a major user-interface update removing interactive content functionality from its television apps, Netflix announced it would be pulling the last two interactive works, Bandersnatch and Kimmy vs the Reverend, from the service in May 2025, with neither being made available in a linear format since.

=== Lawsuit ===
Chooseco, the company founded by R. A. Montgomery to republish the Choose Your Own Adventure book series, filed a lawsuit against Netflix for trademark infringement by use of the phrase "choose your own adventure" in Bandersnatch, seeking upwards of US$25 million in damages. Chooseco claimed it trademarked the phrase in association with movies, books, and other forms of media, and that Netflix started negotiations with Chooseco in 2016 to license the phrase for films and animated series, which did not pan out. Netflix sought to have the suit summarily dismissed on a number of grounds related to trademark law and fair use allowances, but this was denied by the presiding judge based on evidence brought by Chooseco, the full case scheduled to proceed by February 2020. Netflix continued to seek dismissal, arguing that the "choose your own adventure" term had fallen into a generic trademark, and that the branch of the story where it shows Stefan being controlled by a person watching Netflix makes the work different from past "Choose Your Own Adventure" books which put the reader into the role of the protagonist. In November 2020, Netflix and Chooseco reached a settlement, the terms of which were not disclosed.

== Analysis ==
A 1980s period piece and a work of science fiction, Bandersnatch also contains elements of comedy, horror and pathos. It has been described as a psychological thriller. The film heavily incorporates ideas of postmodernism, containing meta-commentary and an unreliable narrator, with free will as a central theme. Ed Cumming of The Independent commented that it contains themes of "authorial control, free will and fate". Beth Elderkin of io9 wrote that Bandersnatch is about the absence of choice, and Stefan's life being outside of his control. Elderkin highlighted the "White Rabbit" ending, in which Stefan finds his rabbit under his bed as a child and joins his mother in dying on the train, as the one point where "free will is celebrated instead of derided". These ideas and themes of monitoring and control, as well as the 1984 setting, led to comparisons to George Orwell's novel Nineteen Eighty-Four. Stuart Heritage of The Guardian wrote that "Brooker has popularised a new form of storytelling, then identified its tropes and dismantled them one by one."

The work was compared to a wide variety of media. Keith Spencer of Salon made comparisons to early internet-era hypertext fiction and the previous Netflix interactive work Puss in Book, which has a broadly similar plot of a character being driven mad by the knowledge that they are controlled by an external force. David Griffin of IGN compared it to the adventure video game series The Walking Dead, whose first installment was released in 2012, and the 2018 adventure game Detroit: Become Human. Karl Quinn of The Sydney Morning Herald compared the work to Mosaic, a 2017 murder mystery released by HBO as an interactive app. Brooker also compared the story to the 1993 comedy fantasy Groundhog Day, about a character who re-lives the same day repeatedly.

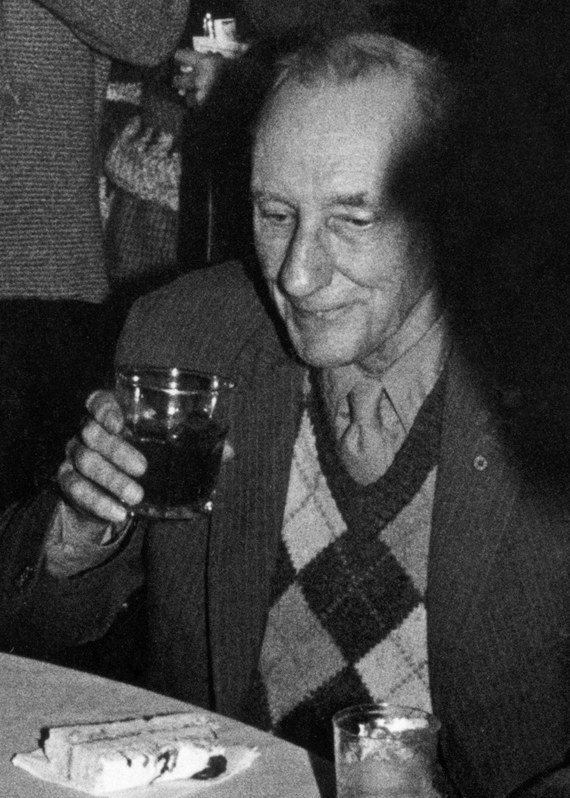
One critic drew connections between the character Jerome F. Davies and the postmodern writer William S. Burroughs (pictured).

The term "bandersnatch" originates from a fictional creature created by Lewis Carroll, which appears in his 1870s poems "Jabberwocky" and "The Hunting of the Snark". The former appears in the novel Through the Looking-Glass, the sequel to Alice's Adventures in Wonderland. A planned video game by Imagine Software, Bandersnatch, took its name from the creature. Its name was mentioned in an Easter egg in series three episode "Playtest", on the front cover of a magazine which is briefly shown onscreen. One of several expensive "megagames" which Imagine Software worked on, Bandersnatch was never released as the company went bankrupt in 1984. Imagine's closure was widely publicised because of the BBC's "Commercial Breaks" series which followed the company's closure and its cascading effects on the British video game industry. As an allusion, the film opens on 9 July 1984, the day Imagine Software closed.

The story shares elements of the works of Philip K. Dick, who frequently wrote about alternate realities and timelines. Jerome F. Davies—the archetype of a tortured artist—can be seen as an allusion to Dick, who frequently used recreational drugs throughout his life, and at one point attempted to kill his wife. The original book cover of Dick's Ubik is prominently featured in Colin's apartment. Rosie Knight of The Hollywood Reporter compared Davies to writer William S. Burroughs, who killed his second wife. In Bandersnatch, there is no ending in which Stefan is happy and the game gets a good review. Jackson McHenry of Vulture wrote that this implied "a link between mental illness, violence, and creativity". Brooker responded that the game itself could be "a force of evil" and said that "the less friction there is in Stefan's life, the more boring the story for an onlooker becomes".

=== Easter eggs ===
The glyph from "White Bear" reappears in Bandersnatch representing two branching pathways.

Like previous instalments of Black Mirror, Bandersnatch makes allusions to earlier episodes. The "branching path" symbol which Davies and later Butler experience is a motif from the series two episode "White Bear". One of Tuckersoft's games is Metl Hedd, a reference to "Metalhead", while Ritman is shown to be working on a game called Nohzdyve, referencing the episode "Nosedive". Butler attends counselling at the Saint Juniper clinic, named after "San Junipero". References to a wide range of events associated with other Black Mirror episodes can be seen in news stories shown in brief shots of the pages of The Sun newspaper and on a television news crawl. The character Dr. R. Haynes alludes to Rolo Haynes, the proprietor of the titular showcase in "Black Museum". There are also Easter eggs to series five episodes which were yet to be released, such as the mention of "Smithereens" character Billy Bauer in a news ticker.

Brooker, Slade and McLean discussed whether there was deeper meaning in the Easter eggs. Slade was reluctant to include the Metl Hedd game, not finding "the need for it". Slade commented that Tuckersoft could later have become TCKR, a company in "San Junipero" and thought that "Metalhead" was an event in the future rather than a simulation. McLean said that stories are developed in isolation, rather than by asking "how do we fit the story into this universe?" Brooker saw the Easter eggs as "a nice nod to superfans" which should not affect the creative process or force viewers to watch the stories in a particular order. Brooker and Poulter have suggested that the character of Colin Ritman could potentially show up in future Black Mirror stories, given that the character, in certain paths, seems to just disappear but has awareness of alternate timelines and realities; he reappeared in season 7's "Plaything".

In one ending, the sound of a computer data tape recording is heard; loading the sound into a ZX Spectrum generates a QR code with the White Bear glyph in the middle that leads to the fictional Tuckersoft website, where a playable copy of the ZX Spectrum game Nohzdyve can be downloaded. This ending was at one point intended to be a clue to a real life treasure hunt in which people could find Bandersnatch cassettes, inspired by the 1979 picture book Masquerade that gave hints as to the location of a buried bejewelled golden hare.

== Reception ==
On Rotten Tomatoes, 74% of 72 reviews are positive for the film, with an average rating of 7.5/10. The website's critical consensus reads, "While Bandersnatch marks an innovative step forward for interactive content, its meta narrative can't quite sustain interest over multiple viewings — though it provides enough trademark Black Mirror tech horror to warrant at least one watch." According to Metacritic, the film received "generally favorable reviews" based on a weighted average score of 61 out of 100 from 16 critic reviews. It garnered ratings of four out of five stars in The Independent and The Observer, and three stars in Rolling Stone. IndieWire gave it an A− rating and IGN reviewed it as eight out of ten.

Describing the piece as "incredibly funny at times", Heritage reviewed it as a "masterpiece of sophistication". Liz Shannon Miller of IndieWire found it "hard-to-define" but "impossible to forget". Quinn believed it to be one of the better instalments of Black Mirror, saying that it was a "brilliant foray into a (more or less) new realm of visual storytelling". However, Brian Lowry of CNN wrote that it was "a wildly familiar plot for a psychological thriller" and Spencer said that the storyline "isn't particularly memorable". Austen Goslin of Polygon criticised that the narrative is "like a cleverly disguised straight line".

The technical design of Bandersnatch was widely praised. Griffin wrote that the tutorial "does a solid job of explaining how the experience works". The user interface and transitions between choice points were lauded by critics including Heritage and NPR's Linda Holmes, who both called it "seamless", and Griffin, who found the feature "smooth and unobtrusive". Miller commented that "the system was very smart about knowing when to essentially fast-forward through earlier storylines to move things forward". The relationship between interactivity and the storyline, however, received less positive reception. Griffin reviewed that the "short amount of time" to make a choice could cause frustration. Goslin believed that the interactivity leads to "staccato pacing that prevents anyone involved from finding a real rhythm in each scene", Roisin O'Connor of The Independent concurring that the choices "can become quite wearisome". Lowry said that the medium "winds up feeling like a gimmick".

The narrative received further criticism. Spencer found it "riddled with cliche", saying that Stefan questioning the nature of free will "has been done to death in print" and other interactive fiction. Holmes wrote that "it would have been good to see this technology demonstrated on a stronger story". Lowry found that the story kept "circling back", which was "numbing and repetitive". Holmes agreed, finding it "deeply frustrating" when she was "simply shown the same segment of story again" until she made the choice "that will actually move you forward". Lucy Mangan of The Observer experienced that the story "rarely landed in an unexpected place". Overall, Rolling Stone's David Fear criticised that the experience gave "little to hold onto after the fact" and that "the story doesn't matter". Holmes found it "especially poorly suited to being watched more than once". In contrast, Cumming reviewed that the medium "is bound with the plot", which "saves the film from pure gimmickry". Griffin felt "responsible" for Stefan's behaviour and "more and more invested in his story". Miller and Quinn both praised the self-referential "Netflix" branch of the story.

The characters were met with mostly negative commentary. Goslin called them "paper thin and barely interesting"; Mangan wrote that the medium did not have "energy to spare to make the characters much more than ciphers". Holmes criticised that the "isolated artist" trope "doesn't really hold up a narrative on its own". She further said that the audience doesn't "learn enough about who [Stefan] is to care about him". In regard to Stefan's backstory involving his mother's death, Goslin commented that Bandersnatch is "really only interested in this premise as a bridge toward its ultimate destination: becoming meta commentary on itself and video games as a medium". However, the acting was met with praise from Griffin, who approved of "impactful performances from Fionn Whitehead and Will Poulter", and Cumming, finding that Poulter "steals most of his scenes". Cumming further wrote that "the dialogue is as knowing and smart as we have come to expect".

=== Episode rankings ===
Bandersnatch received mixed rankings on critics' lists of the 23 instalments of Black Mirror, from best to worst:

- 5th (of the Top Seven) – Al Horner, GQ
- 5th – Ed Power, The Telegraph
- 6th – Matt Donnelly and Tim Molloy, TheWrap
- 11th – Charles Bramesco, Vulture
- 11th – Travis Clark, Business Insider
- 13th – Morgan Jeffery, Digital Spy
- 14th – Corey Atad, Esquire
- 14th – James Hibberd, Entertainment Weekly
- 14th – Aubrey Page, Collider

=== Awards ===
Among its nominations, Bandersnatch won two Primetime Emmy Awards and a Broadcasting Press Guild TV and Radio Award in the Innovation category. Charlie Brooker won the Best Game Writing category at the 2018 Nebula Awards in 2019, rather than a storytelling category.

List of awards and nominations received by Black Mirror: Bandersnatch
Year	Award	Category	Recipients	Result	Ref.
2019	British Academy Television Awards	Best Single Drama	Black Mirror: Bandersnatch	Nominated	
2019	British Academy Television Awards	Best Special, Visual And Graphic Effects	Black Mirror: Bandersnatch	Nominated	
2019	British Academy Television Awards	Editing: Fiction	Tony Kearns	Nominated	
2019	Broadcasting Press Guild TV and Radio Awards	Innovation Award	Black Mirror: Bandersnatch	Won	
2019	Fangoria Chainsaw Awards	Best Streaming Premiere Film	David Slade	Nominated	
2019	Golden Trailer Awards	Best Drama/Action Poster for a TV/Streaming Series	Black Mirror: Bandersnatch	Won	
2019	Nebula Awards	Best Game Writing	Charlie Brooker	Won	
2019	Primetime Emmy Awards	Outstanding Television Movie	Annabel Jones and Charlie Brooker (executive producers); Russell McLean (producer)	Won	
2019	Primetime Emmy Awards	Outstanding Creative Achievement in Interactive Media Within a Scripted Program	Black Mirror: Bandersnatch	Won	
2019	Rondo Hatton Classic Horror Awards	Best Television Presentation	Black Mirror: Bandersnatch	Nominated	
2020	Casting Society of America	Film – Nontheatrical Release	Jina Jay	Nominated	
2020	Producers Guild Awards	Innovation Award	Black Mirror: Bandersnatch	Nominated	

== See also ==
- Brataccas, a 1986 video game which may have been based on the 1984 vaporware game project Bandersnatch by Imagine Software
- Interactive Adventures, a series of online interactive stories created by Chad, Matt & Rob that are a predecessor to the Bandersnatch storytelling model
