= Choose Your Own Adventure: The Abominable Snowman =

- DVD cover
- Directed by: Bob Doucette
- Written by: Shawn Tanaka; Doug Wood; Elise Allen
- Produced by: Michelle Crames; Jeff Norton
- Distributed by: Goldhil Entertainment
- Release date: July 25, 2006
- Running time: 80 minutes (interactive)
- Country: United States
- Languages: English; Nepali

Choose Your Own Adventure: The Abominable Snowman is a 2006 animated interactive DVD movie based on the Choose Your Own Adventure gamebook of the same name by R. A. Montgomery. Viewers make choices every 3–6 minutes using their DVD player remote control to determine what happens. It was released on DVD on July 25, 2006.

== Plot ==
The North siblings, Benjamin, Crista and Marco, must rescue their missing Uncle Rudy, who has gone to the Himalayas in search of the mythical Yeti. The first decision that the player has to make is when their Fokker F27 has a fuel leak and they either have to parachute or stay.

Producer Jeff Norton explains that they aspired to create alternate story paths (there are "over eleven possible endings") with different characters and story developments and yet obey the rules of their fictional world.

== Cast ==
- William H. Macy as Rudyard North
- Frankie Muniz as Benjamin North
- Lacey Chabert as Crista North
- Daryl Sabara as Marco North
- Felicity Huffman as Pilot Neema
- Mark Hamill as Jamling
- Phil LaMarr as Pasang
- Dee Bradley Baker as Bucky
- James Hong as Monk
- Kim Mai Guest as Old Woman

== Production ==
Jeff Norton and Michelle Crames (the producers of the film and founders of Lean Forward Media) recall reading the classic Choose Your Own Adventure series in their youths. Norton explains that they "developed a patent-pending technology" for using the remote control and created the film's main characters (forgoing the book's more ambiguous second-person perspective). He noted the touch of cinematic perspective Bob Doucette brought the film. Director Norton believed that the interactivity would provide an interesting way for parents and children to discuss the story and characters. The DVD also provides documentary material on life in Nepal, cast interviews, and a music video.

Norton stated on Leanforwardmedia.com that the film would appeal to parents who grew up with the books. Crame said that parents would value the film because through it kids would learn about making decisions and the consequences of those decisions.

Upon its release, the film was featured on “18 million boxes of Life cereal.”

== Reception ==
In their review, the Dove Foundation praised the concept of the film, stating that, “Teaching your children how to make choices, and deal with what the outcomes of those choices might be, is hard to do,” and noting that each adventure can last 20 minutes depending on the choices the viewer makes. Kidzworld gave it four stars and noted how the DVD makes a choice for the viewer after a certain amount of time. Dave Johnson, in a review on DVD Verdict, praised the overall concept of “multiple branching storylines” on a DVD and noted the colorful animation, anamorphic widescreen presentation and 5.1 surround sound.

Colin Jacobson in a review for DVD Movie Guide said that the color palette was a strength but found many aspects of the film to be generic and uninteresting; he also stated that the smoothness with which the story transitions is sometimes an issue and found one life decision choice to be unfairly punishing.

== Series ==
Choose Your Own Adventure: The Abominable Snowman was to be the first in a series of DVDs based on the Choose Your Own Adventure books. Other planned releases included The Lost Jewels and Mystery of the Maya. As of early 2018, however, there have yet to be further releases. The Abominable Snowman was not the first of the CYOA books, being the 12th in the series, though the books had no ongoing continuity.

== Music video ==
The song in the music video, called "Choose Your Own Adventure", was composed and written by Arnie Roman and Russ DeSalvo, while the vocals were provided by Cassidy Ladden. It can be found on YouTube.

== Endorsements ==
- Approved for Family Viewing by Dove Foundation
- 2006 iParenting Media Award Winner
- Kids First! All Star Award
- Film Advisory Board Seal of Approval
