= Gamebook =

Type of work of printed fiction

A gamebook is a work of printed fiction that allows the reader to participate in the story by making choices. The narrative branches along various paths, typically through the use of numbered paragraphs or pages. Each narrative typically does not follow paragraphs in a linear or ordered fashion. Gamebooks are sometimes called choose your own adventure books or CYOA (after the influential Choose Your Own Adventure series originally published by US company Bantam Books) or pick-a-paths. Gamebooks influenced hypertext fiction.

Production of new gamebooks in the West decreased dramatically during the 1990s as choice-based stories have moved away from print-based media, although the format may be experiencing a resurgence on mobile and ebook platforms. Such digital gamebooks are considered interactive fiction or visual novels.

== Description ==
Gamebooks range widely in terms of the complexity of the game aspect. At one end are the branching-plot novels, which require the reader to make choices but are otherwise like regular novels (this style is exemplified by the originator of the gamebook format, Choose Your Own Adventure, and is sometimes referred to as "American style").

At the other end of the spectrum are what amounts to "solitaire RPG adventures" or "adventure gamebooks", which emulate a tabletop RPG in novel form and feature sophisticated rules for battling monsters and overcoming obstacles. The story can be decided by factors other than the reader's choices, such as dice rolls (or other randomization mechanics, such as leafing through the book to arrive at a random paragraph number), the lack (or presence) of equipment or other items, or by various statistics, such as running out of health points.

In all gamebooks, the story is presented as a series of sections of printed text. These are often but not always numbered. Branching-plot novel sections often run to several pages in length, whereas solitaire and adventure gamebook sections are usually no longer than a paragraph or two. These are not intended to be read in order. Instead, at the end of a text section, the reader is typically given a choice of narrative branches that they may follow. Each branch contains a reference to the number of the paragraph or page that should be read next if that branch is chosen (e.g. to go north turn to section 98). The narrative thus does not progress linearly through the book or follow the paragraphs in numerical order. The story continues this way until a paragraph or page which ends that branch of the story. Many solitaire or adventure gamebooks feature a single "successful" ending, and the remainder are "failures". Thus, a gamebook becomes a "puzzle" since only a few or even one branching paths lead to victory. Branching plot novels, on the other hand, tend to be more concerned with narrative resolution rather than winning or losing, thus often have several endings which may be deemed equally "successful".

Gamebooks are typically written in the second person with the reader assuming the role of a character to experience the world from that character's point of view (e.g. "you walk into the cold and dark forest").

Many gamebooks form series with a common theme, trade dress, and/or ruleset. While each book is typically a stand-alone narrative, there are gamebook series such as Steve Jackson's Sorcery! that continue the narrative from the previous books in the series.

== History ==
=== Origins ===
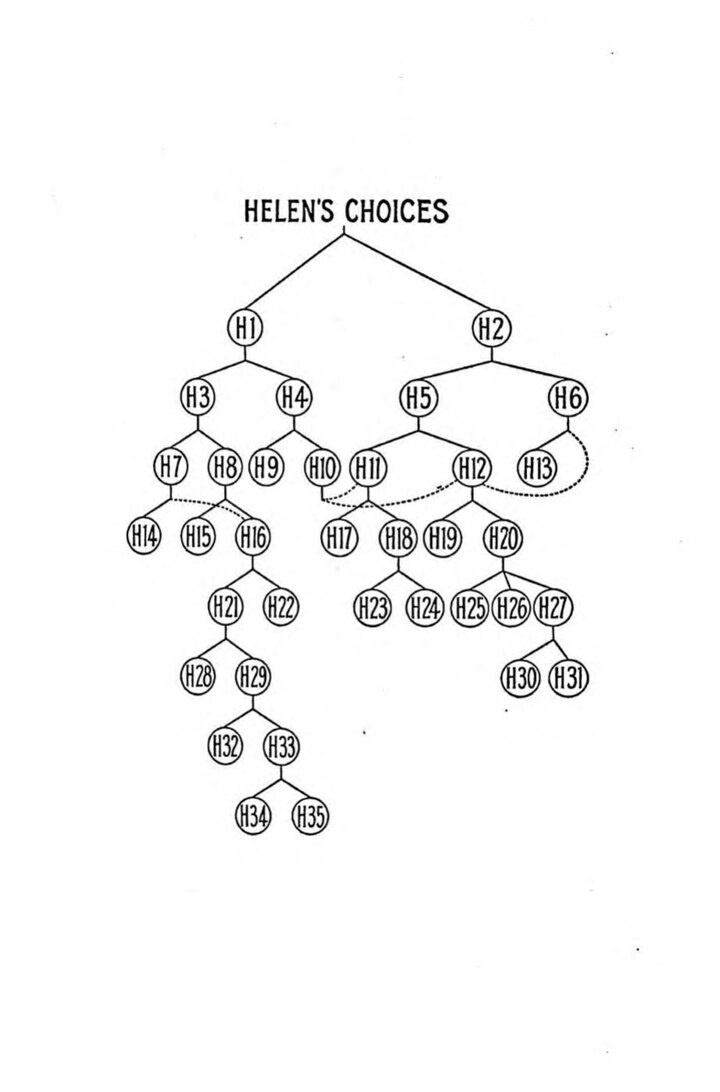
Diagram illustrating the multiple choices and varying endings of the 'Helen' section of Consider the Consequences! (1930)

There are several examples of early works of art with branching narratives. The romantic novel Consider the Consequences! by Doris Webster and Mary Alden Hopkins was published in the United States in 1930, and boasts "a dozen or more" different endings depending on the "taste of the individual reader". The 1936 play Night of January 16th by Ayn Rand, about a trial, is unusual in that members of the audience are chosen to play the jury and deliver a verdict, which then influences the play's ending: guilty or not guilty.

Also quite early on, the possibility of having stories branching out into several different paths was suggested by Jorge Luis Borges in his short story "An Examination of the Work of Herbert Quain" (1941). This story features an author whose novel is a three-part story containing two branch points, and with nine possible endings. Another story by Borges, titled "The Garden of Forking Paths" (1941), also describes a book with a maze-like narrative, which may have inspired the gamebook form. The children's book Treasure Hunt, published in 1945 in Britain under the name of "Alan George" (probably a pseudonym), is another early example of a story with multiple paths for the reader to follow.

Programmed learning materials have been recognized as an early influence on the development of branching path books. This learning method was first applied in the TutorText series of interactive textbooks, published from the late 1950s up until the early 1970s. These books present the reader with a series of problems related to a particular area of study, allowing him or her to choose among several possible answers. If the answer to a problem is correct, the reader moves on to the next problem. If the answer is incorrect, the reader is given feedback and is asked to pick a different answer. This educational technique would form a basis for many later narrative gamebook series.

During the 1960s, authors from several different countries started experimenting with fiction that contained multiple paths and/or endings. Some literary works in this vein include the French-language novel L'ironie du sort (1961) by Paul Guimard, the Spanish-language novels Hopscotch (1963) by Julio Cortázar and Juego de cartas (Card Game, 1964) by Max Aub, and the works of the French literary group known as the Oulipo (1967). Other early experiments include the short stories "Alien Territory" and "The Lost Nose: a Programmed Adventure" (both 1969) by John Sladek, the novel The French Lieutenant's Woman (1969) by John Fowles, and the collection of short stories titled Tante storie per giocare (Many Tales to Play With, 1971) by Italian author Gianni Rodari.

Although the latter experimented with the format of engaging the reader through a second-person perspective or branching narratives, the 1960s and '70s also saw the publication of several books from across Europe that met the criteria for gamebooks as understood today, and prior to the Choose Your Own Adventure series. The earliest of these was Lucky Les (1967) by British author E.W. Hildick, which has been called "likely the first fully-fledged gamebook" as it comports entirely with the standards later expected by readers, and self-identified in its blurb as a game in book form. Other early innovators included State of Emergency by Dennis Guerrier and Joan Richards (1969), the Swedish-language book Den mystiska påsen (The Mysterious Bag, 1970) by Betty Orr-Nilsson, and the French-language book Histoires comme tu voudras (Stories as You Want Them, 1978) by Marie-Christine Helgerson, among others. Despite their relative lack of involvement, compared to British and American authors, in gamebooks as a cultural phenomenon, French authors and their experimental novels (as above) were nonetheless prominent in the format's precursors and embryonic stages.

=== Breakthroughs and popularization ===
In the US, The Adventures of You series appeared in 1976–77, with two titles that would later become part of the groundbreaking Choose Your Own Adventure series: Sugarcane Island by Edward Packard and Journey Under the Sea by R. A. Montgomery.

Tabletop role-playing games such as Dungeons & Dragons were another early influence that would contribute in major ways to the development of the gamebook form. The first module which combined a branching-path narrative with a set of role-playing game rules was Buffalo Castle for the Tunnels & Trolls system (1975). Buffalo Castle was innovative for its time, as it allowed the reader to experience a role-playing session without need for a referee. It has been followed by many other solitaire adventures for the T&T system, as well as solos for other tabletop role-playing games.

The first commercially successful series of gamebooks was the Choose Your Own Adventure series establishing the "American" gamebook tradition. The "British" tradition, as exemplified by the Fighting Fantasy series, was, by contrast, slightly younger. British gamebooks differ from the American tradition by having rules more strongly influenced by the game mechanics of roleplaying games.

==== The US (late 1970s–) ====
The Adventures of You, a two-book series, authored by Edward Packard and R.A. Montgomery and initially published by Vermont Crossroads Press, laid much of the groundwork for the later surge in popularity of the gamebook format. Sugarcane Island by Edward Packard was written in 1969 but did not see publication until 1976. This became a series when Journey Under the Sea by R. A. Montgomery was published in 1977. Two standalone gamebooks authored by Packard would follow, both published by Lippincott: Deadwood City (1978) and The Third Planet from Altair (1979). While these early efforts apparently achieved some popularity with readers, they (and the gamebook format in general) still did not have a publisher with the marketing strength required to make them available to mass audiences.

Packard and Montgomery took the idea of publishing interactive books to Bantam, and thus the Choose Your Own Adventure (CYOA) series was born in 1979, beginning with The Cave of Time. The series became immensely popular worldwide and several titles were translated into more than 25 languages. The series reached the peak of its popularity with children in the 1980s. It was during this period that Bantam released several other interactive series to capitalize on the popularity of the medium (a few examples are: Choose your Own Adventure for Younger Readers, Time Machine and Be An Interplanetary Spy). Many other American publishers released their own series to compete with CYOA.

One of the most popular competitors seems to have been TSR, who released several branching-path novels based on their own role-playing games. The most famous TSR series was Endless Quest (1982–). Another strong competitor was Ballantine with their Find Your Fate series, which featured adventures in the Indiana Jones, James Bond and Doctor Who universes. Famous author R. L. Stine wrote several books for this line, including The Badlands of Hark, as well as for other series such as Wizards, Warriors and You. Several Choose your Own Adventure spin-offs and many competing series were translated into other languages.

==== The UK (early 1980s–) ====
One of the most influential and popular gamebook series was the Fighting Fantasy series, which started in 1980 when a Puffin Books representative saw a hall full of 5,000 people playing Dungeons & Dragons and asked Ian Livingstone and Steve Jackson to make a book about role-playing games. They instead offered the idea of a book which simulated the experience of roleplaying games. Within a year they presented a book under the name of The Magic Quest to Puffin which Puffin agreed to publish. Having spent six more months developing the concept it was published under the name of The Warlock of Firetop Mountain in 1982.

Another notable UK gamebook series is Lone Wolf, developed by Joe Dever in 1984. Like Fighting Fantasy, the writer was an experienced Dungeons & Dragons player who developed the setting of Lone Wolf for his campaigns. However the books were also inspired by medieval texts such as Gawain and the Green Knight and Le Morte d'Arthur.

Grailquest is a series of gamebooks written by J.H. Brennan (also beginning in 1984) that were also inspired by the Arthurian legends. Set mainly on Avalon they make use of a dice based system.

The Way of the Tiger, a Japan-themed gamebook series by Mark Smith and Jamie Thomson (starting in 1985), is also a notable UK publication.

==== Outside English-speaking countries (mid 1980s–) ====
Branching-path books also started to appear during the 1980s in several other countries, including Spain, France, Italy, Mexico, Chile, Denmark and Japan.

Despite the domination of works that have been translated from English in most non-English-speaking countries, a sizable number of original gamebooks—both individual books and series—have been published in various countries; this is especially the case in France (e.g. the La Saga du Prêtre Jean series) and in Japan (e.g. Tokyo Sogensha's Super Adventure Game series and Futabasha's Bouken Gamebook series).

In some other countries, publication both of translated series and of original books began in later years. For example, the first original books in Brazil and Italy seem to have appeared in the 1990s.

==== Eastern Europe (late 1980s–) ====
Translated editions of Choose your Own Adventure, Fighting Fantasy and other English-language series only appeared in Eastern European countries after the fall of Communism.

Since the mid-1980s, about 90 gamebooks have been published in Poland, not only as printed books, but also as comics, e-books or mobile applications. The author of the largest number of titles (20) is Beniamin Muszyński. Polish gamebooks are regularly written by their fans and published online by "Masz Wybór" (publishing house which has been operating since 2010).

In the 1990s, the gamebook genre became highly popular in Bulgaria for approximately ten years. Whilst internationally well-known series such as Choose Your Own Adventure and Fighting Fantasy were translated for the Bulgarian market, the works of numerous Bulgarian gamebook authors were most popular with readers.

During the popularity peak of gamebooks in Bulgaria, Bulgarian publishing houses believed that only Western authors would sell and, as a consequence, virtually all Bulgarian gamebook authors adopted English pseudonyms. This tradition persisted after their nationality was publicly disclosed. A smaller number of Hungarian authors also adopted Western pseudonyms, in addition to "official titles" that were also in English. In [Romania] Lucian Zup wrote The Run from the clock where the readers have to choose between multiple choices regarding the time and also Double Cat where a classical narrative is interrupted by the various games for the reader to go on to the next levels.

Several adventure gamebooks have been released in the Czech Republic and Russia. In Azerbaijan, Narmin Kamal's novel, Open It's Me, offers the reader a choice to either read the book as a random collection of thirty-nine short stories about the same character, or as a single novel. A photo of the book's hero is published on the final page and the author asks the reader questions about the character.

=== Decline and resurgence (1990s onward) ===
The branching-path book commercial boom dwindled in the early 1990s, and the number of new series diminished. However, new branching-path books continue to be published to this day in several countries and languages. Choose Your Own Adventure went on to become the longest running gamebook series with 184 titles. The first run of the series ended in 1998.

R. A. Montgomery started rereleasing some Choose Your Own Adventure titles in 2005. His company has also released some new titles. New books and series continue to be published in other countries to this day. Examples are the 1000 Gefahren series in Germany and the Tú decides la aventura series in Spain. The sixtieth and "lost" entry in the Fighting Fantasy series, Bloodbones, was finally published by Wizard in 2006.

In recent years, the format may be getting a new lease on life on mobile and ebook platforms.

== Types ==
This type of book was seen predominantly as a form of entertainment for children. Nonetheless, there were books with more didactic purposes (ranging from historical series such as the aforementioned Time Machine to books with religious themes such as the Making Choices series). Also, a few branching-path books were aimed at adults, ranging from business simulations to works of erotica.

=== Mainstream fiction ===
Barring the aforementioned works of Dennis Guerrier in the 1960s, one of the earliest examples of the form is the five-volume Barcelona, Maxima Discrecion series, which adapted the noir fiction genre to an interactive form. Published in the 1980s, this series was only available in Catalan and Spanish.

Heather McElhatton published a bestselling gamebook for adults in 2007, called Pretty Little Mistakes: A Do-Over Novel. It was followed by a sequel titled Million Little Mistakes published in 2010.

Some contemporary literary novels have used the gamebook format, including Kim Newman's Life's Lottery (1999) and Nicholas Bourbaki's If (2014).

=== Education ===
In 2011, McGraw-Hill Education began releasing adaptations of the original Choose Your Own Adventure titles as graded readers. The stories were retold in simplified language and re-organized plotlines, in order to make them easier for English as a second or foreign language readers to play. The choice format of gamebooks has proved to be popular with ESL teachers as a way to motivate reluctant students, target critical thinking skills, and organize classroom activities.

=== Erotica ===
Various erotic gamebooks have been published by major publishers. In 1994 Derrière la porte by Alina Reyes was published by Pocket Books France and Éditions Robert Laffont, and later translated into English for Grove Press and Weidenfeld & Nicolson (as Behind Closed Doors) and into Italian for Ugo Guanda Editore (as Dietro le porte). Melcher Media in 2003 packaged two "Choose-Your-Own-Erotic-Adventure" books for Penguin Books' Gotham Books imprint, including Kathryn in the City by Mary Anne Mohanraj, a well-known writer of erotica.

=== Role-playing solitaire adventures ===
Solitaire adventures were a parallel development. This type of book is intended to allow a single person to use the rules of a role-playing game to experience an adventure without need of a referee. The first role-playing game solitaire adventures to be published were those using the Tunnels & Trolls system, beginning with the book Buffalo Castle in 1976, making Tunnels & Trolls the first role-playing game to support solitaire play. Flying Buffalo released 24 solo adventure books (plus several pocket size adventures) in the period 1976–1993. A number of the adventures are still in print today. They were very successful among players of role-playing games and inspired many imitators.

Another early role-playing game with solitaire modules made for it was The Fantasy Trip. The first such module was Death Test, published in 1978. Eight adventures were released in total. One thing that set them apart was the need for miniatures and a hexmap, in order to take advantage of the combat and movement systems. These adventures were also very popular and influential.

Meanwhile, several third-party publishers started to publish solitaire adventures meant for use with popular roleplaying systems. Some of the earliest adventures in this vein were The Solo Dungeon (1978) by British author Richard Bartle, and Survival of the Fittest (1979), published by Judges' Guild in the United States. Both of these adventures were meant to be used with Dungeons & Dragons rules.

Solitaire role-playing adventures also experienced a boom in the 1980s. Many role-playing rulesets included solo adventures which were intended to teach the rules systems to the players. Some companies released lines of solitaire adventures for their own games. Examples of games with prolific solitaire lines were Dungeons & Dragons, GURPS, Das Schwarze Auge, DC Heroes, and Call of Cthulhu. Some third-party publishers continued to release solo adventures for established RPG systems (including Judges' Guild, who released solos for Advanced Dungeons & Dragons). Solitaire adventures were also featured quite frequently in professional RPG magazines and fanzines. Several solo adventures (such as those for Tunnels & Trolls, Dungeons & Dragons, and Das Schwarze Auge) were translated into other languages.

As was the case with other types of gamebooks, the production of solitaire RPG adventures decreased dramatically during the 1990s. However, new solos continue to be published to this day. Some companies continue to produce solo adventures for Tunnels & Trolls. There are also new solo adventures for a variety of systems, and even some influenced by the Fantasy Trip solos (such as the ones by Dark City Games). The Internet has provided a channel to distribute solitaire adventures, with both free and commercial adventures made available as electronic documents.

=== Adventures ===
Adventure gamebooks incorporate elements from Choose Your Own Adventure books and role-playing solitaire adventures. The books involve a branching path format in order to move between sections of text, but the reader creates a character as in a role-playing game, and resolves actions using a game-system. Unlike role-playing solitaire adventures, adventure gamebooks include all the rules needed for play in each book. Adventure gamebooks are usually not divided into numbered pages, but rather into numbered sections of text, so that several sections may fit in a single page, or a single section can span several pages.

The Warlock of Firetop Mountain was published in 1982, the first of what became the Fighting Fantasy series of gamebooks, one of the first adventure gamebook series. With over 60 titles, including a variety of spin-offs, the series popularised the gamebook format in the UK and many other countries, such as Canada, Australia, New Zealand, South Africa, Singapore, the United States, Portugal, Tanzania, Brazil, Spain, France, Germany, Italy, Denmark, Israel, Japan, and after the fall of communism, Eastern Europe.

Several authors in different countries continue to publish adventure gamebooks in the late 2010s. Notable examples are German fantasy authors Wolfgang Hohlbein, Markus Heitz, and Lemonbits.

== Online adaptations ==
Given the similar structure to html links between the pages of a website, numerous efforts have been made to create a digital equivalent to the gamebook format, with varying degrees of success. These include visual novels, story websites, and various experiments with audio CDs (such as TSR, Inc's short-lived "Terror TRAX" line).

== See also ==
- Adventure game
- Interactive film
- Interactive fiction
- List of gamebooks
- Nonlinear narrative
- Visual novel
