= Virtual Murder =

Virtual Murder may refer to:

- Virtual Murder (TV series), a 1992 investigative drama series
- Virtual Murder (video game series), a murder-mystery adventure video game series
