= Mary Alden (disambiguation) =

Mary Alden (1883–1946) was an American motion picture- and stage actress. Mary Alden may also refer to:

- Mary Alden Childers, real name of Molly Childers (1875–1964), American-born Irish writer and nationalist
- Mary Alden Hopkins (1876–1960), American journalist, essayist, and activist
