= Shannon Gilligan =

American novelist

- Born: United States
- Partner: R. A. Montgomery
- Writing career
- Genre: Interactive fiction

Shannon Gilligan is an author of interactive fiction and computer games.

== Early life and education ==
Gilligan graduated from Williams College in 1981 and spent a year abroad at Doshisha University in Kyoto, Japan.

== Career ==
Gilligan has been extensively involved in the Choose Your Own Adventure series, having written five books in the main series and six others in the "Younger Readers" series. Her stepsons, Ramsey Montgomery(deceased) and Anson Montgomery, wrote several books in the series as well. Shannon was married to the series co-founder, R. A. Montgomery. She also worked in mystery computer games for Activision such as The Elk Moon Murder and the Murder Mystery series for Creative Multimedia. Following her work with Creative Multimedia, she would form Spark Interactive to develop the Windows and Mac software Comic Creator - which was voted "Best Software of the Year" by People Magazine in 1995.

In 2003, Gilligan and her husband, R.A. Montgomery, founded Chooseco, a Choose Your Own Adventure publisher to launch books in print and ebooks.

She lives in Warren, Vermont.

== Bibliography ==
Gilligan's works have been translated into twenty languages.

=== Choose Your Own Adventure series ===
- #14 The Search for Champ (November 1983)
- #15 The Three Wishes (April 1984)
- #21 Mona Is Missing (October 1984)
- #29 The Fairy Kidnap (August 1985)
- #33 Haunted Harbor (April 1986)
- #43 Home in Time for Christmas (December 1987)
- #44 The Mystery of Ura Senke (May 1985)
- #53 The Case of the Silk King (February 1986, adapted by ABC for an hour-long prime-time special)
- #81 Terror in Australia (July 1988)
- #119 The Terrorist Trap (November 1991)
- #127 Showdown (August 1992)

=== Mystery games ===
- The Elk Moon Murder
- Who Killed Sam Rupert? (1993)
- Who Killed Brett Penace? The Environmental Surfer (1994)
- Who Killed Elspeth Haskard? The Magic Death
- Who Killed Taylor French?
- Santa Fe Mysteries: Sacred Ground (1997)
- Comic Creator

== See also ==
- List of Choose Your Own Adventure books
