= Supercomputer (disambiguation) =

A supercomputer is a computer with a high level of performance as compared to a general-purpose computer.

Supercomputer may also refer to:

== Fiction ==
- "Super Computer", an episode of the Adult Swim animated television series Aqua Teen Hunger Force
- Super Computer, a fictional TV sitcom in the universe of the TV show 30 Rock
- Supercomputer, a book by Edward Packard
