= Who Killed Sam Rupert? =

1993 video game

- Cover of Virtual Murder 1: Who Killed Sam Rupert?
- Developer: Creative Multimedia Corporation
- Series: Virtual Murder
- Platforms: Macintosh, Windows
- Release: 1993
- Genres: Adventure, murder mystery

Who Killed Sam Rupert? is a computer game developed by Creative Multimedia Corporation in 1993 for the Macintosh and Windows.

== Plot ==
Who Killed Sam Rupert? is an adventure and murder mystery game on CD-ROM. The player must solve the murder of restaurateur Sam Rupert, presenting the case to the media during a press conference at the end of the game's time limit. The player select which items from the crime scene will be fingerprinted or sent for examination in the lab. The player will need to interview the main suspects, as an assistant records interviews with both witnesses and suspects.

The assistant reminds the player of appointment, keeps telephone messages for the player, and even suggests who the player can talk to.

== Development ==
In 1993, Creative Multimedia Corporation decided to launch a series of police adventure video games onto the market. They sought a collaboration with Shannon Gilligan, who had a successful career as a screenwriter, novel writer, and children's book author. They wanted the player experience to be grounded in realism and to be removed from the magic and science fiction of other detective mysteries. The first entry, Who Killed Sam Rupert? was released in January 1993.

== Reception ==
Computer Gaming World stated that because of its limited interactivity Who Killed Sam Rupert? "is better understood as a work of fiction" than a game, and would appeal more to mystery fans than gamers. The magazine described the acting as "surprisingly good", and hoped that "future titles will involve more interactivity ... a promising start" for CMC. The game was reviewed in 1993 in Dragon #195 by Hartley, Patricia, and Kirk Lesser in "The Role of Computers" column. The reviewers gave the game 4 out of 5 stars.

Randy Chase for CD-ROM Today said that Sam Rupert sets a refreshingly new standard for the look, feel, and content of multimedia games." PC Home said that "As it stands, it's another case of nice idea, shame about the implementation." MacUser said that "Who Killed Sam Rupert? has a rich, multilayered interface that's fun to explore even after you've solved the murder - which we did the first time out." Macworld gave the game 4 out of 5 stars and said that "you'll probably be pleased at how much fun you have tracking the killer".

The CD-ROM Book said that "The sound and video make this game an interesting, interactive whodunnit."

Allgame reviewer Anthony Baize recommended that players take copious notes and only expect to succeed on their fifth or sixth try because of the relentless press conference and warrant application sections. PixelPacas rated the first game 3 out of 5 and described is as a 1990s version of Her Story. Four Fat Chicks hoped their review steered away naive gamers from this game, which they considered dull and sub-par. Adventure's Planet deemed the series "absolutely mediocre".

=== Awards and nominations ===
- New Media Invision Award of Excellence for Who Killed Sam Rubert?
