= Heather McElhatton =

American writer and radio presenter

- Born: Chicago, Illinois
- Occupations: Radio Host, Writer

Heather McElhatton is a writer and producer for Public Radio International. McElhatton produced the literary series Talking Volumes from 2001 to 2006. From 2005 to 2007 she hosted the live variety show Stage Sessions for Minnesota Public Radio at the Fitzgerald Theater in St Paul, Minnesota. The show combined storytelling, spoken word, music and featured guests including Sebastian Junger, Ann Bancroft, Kevin Kling, Bill Holm and Robert Bly.

== Biography ==
McElhatton was born in Chicago, Illinois.

MCElhatton studied at the University of London and SACI in Florence, Italy, and earned her MFA in creative writing from Warren Wilson College in Asheville, North Carolina.

McElhatton has published several short stories, including Red Shoes in Alabama and the Whore Who Wore Them which was nominated for a Pushcart Prize in 2001.

McElhatton appeared on a televised episode of This American Life in a segment called "Peezilla", where she recaptured her experience on a school bus when she was a little girl.

Her debut novel, Pretty Little Mistakes, was a choose your own adventure style book for adults published by HarperCollins in May 2007. Her second book, "Jennifer Johnson is Sick of Being Single", was released by HarperCollins in May 2009. Her fourth book is Jennifer Johnson is Sick of Being Married.

Million Little Mistakes, a sequel to Pretty Little Mistakes, in which the reader decides how to spend $22 million in lottery winnings, was released in 2010.
