= Pretty Little Mistakes =

Book by Heather McElhatton

Pretty Little Mistakes is a book written by Heather McElhatton and published on May 1, 2007 by HarperCollins.

The novel is written in second-person narrative and allows the reader to direct the story's direction, similar to the Choose Your Own Adventure books. The novel has more than 150 possible endings. Half of the endings are "good", the rest "bad". After an introduction, the reader is asked to determine the protagonist's next action. From that choice, the plot branches out, leading to more decisions and eventually multiple possible endings. Endings include the death of the protagonist and/or their companions.
