= Consider the Consequences! =

1930 American interactive romantic novel

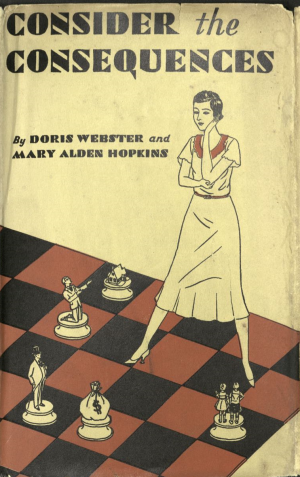
- dust jacket of the original hardback edition
- Author: Doris Webster; Mary Alden Hopkins
- Genre: Romance
- Publisher: The Century Company
- Publication date: 1930
- Publication place: United States
- Text: Consider the Consequences! at Wikisource

Consider the Consequences! (Note: The title page has Consider the Consequences!, with an exclamation mark, but its original dust jacket (pictured) has none.) (published 1930) is a romantic novel in the form of an interactive novel or gamebook by the American writing partnership (Note: For a list of their collaborative works see Mary Alden Hopkins § With Doris Webster.) of Doris Webster (1885–1967) and Mary Alden Hopkins (1876–1960). It is now considered the earliest known gamebook, and has 43 different endings.

== Publication ==
The 146-page hardback was published by The Century Company in the United States, priced $1.50.

The book's central characters are Helen Rogers, a young woman, and her two male suitors, Jed Harringdale and Saunders Mead. The central dilemma is Helen's choice between the suitor she loves and the suitor that is the most practical. The book consists of three chapters, each told from a different character's viewpoint. While the reader can jump to each chapter in any order, the book is intended to be read in the order of first Helen, then Jed, and finally Saunders.

The format of each chapter consists of individual entries (of about two pages each) ending with a choice presented to the reader. For example, if Helen chooses Saunders, should she stay at home to help her aging mother, or should she move to the big city and prioritize her career? Depending on each choice, the reader is then directed to continue reading different subsequent entries. There are 43 endings, and a little over 90 entries in total.

The book was favorably reviewed, among others, in The Tampa Times, the Santa Ana Register (who called it "a freak book"), the Detroit Free Press, The San Francisco Examiner, and The Salt Lake Tribune.

== Legacy ==
On July 6, 2018 the book was read on air on KZSC radio in Santa Cruz, USA, by James Ryan, who has researched the book and its authors, and his wife Nina, with choices made by the station's listeners.

A copy was made available on the Internet Archive in August 2023. A transcription was published on Wikisource in January 2026, days after the book's US copyright expired.

In October 2023, the game was ported to TWINE and made available for online play at itch.io.
