= Mary Alden Hopkins =

American journalist, essayist, and activist

Mary Alden Hopkins (1876 – November 8, 1960) was an American journalist, essayist, and activist. She served as editor for several leading magazines and did freelance work for literary groups including The Atlantic Monthly, The American Mercury, and The New York Times magazine. Hopkins published polemical pieces in both mainstream and special-interest journals on labor reform, dress reform, birth control, pacifism, vegetarianism, and suffrage. Her creative writing was shaped by her politics as she wrote poems and novels about peace, women's suffrage, and other social issues.

She co-wrote several books with Doris Webster, including Consider the Consequences!, the first gamebook, in which readers choose which of various alternate paths the plot should follow.

== Early life ==
Hopkins was born in Bangor, Maine, in 1876. Her father George H. Hopkins was a banker and she grew up in a home that was described by Hopkins as "monogamous, Republican, and Protestant." Her mother Mary Allen Webster Hopkins was considered to be extremely sensitive to responsibility and hated routine duties but her conscience forced her to perform them anyway and she may have been suffering from mental illness ("nervous prostration") long before it was recognized by medical professionals, so both the mother and daughter thought that taking care of Mary as a child was what made her mother sick. Hopkins assumed as a child that she was to blame for her mother's unhappiness. and early in her life she decided that the least she could do for her parents was to earn her own living to “lessen [her] sense of guilt in living at all.” Hopkins learned about eighteenth-century England as her father had an extensive library.

She was engaged to an unnamed man, but her parents disapproved of her potential husband, so he went to work in the city to get more wealth for her parents' approval while Hopkins stayed behind to work in Bangor. However, Hopkins found out that her fiancé had married a woman whom he met in the city and had been living with. Later on, Hopkins studied at Wellesley College and at Columbia University where she earned her master's degree.

== U.S. women's suffrage involvement ==
After her studies, Hopkins entered New York activist circles as a journalist and essayist, publishing works in both mainstream and special-interest journals on labor reform, dress reform, birth control, pacifism, vegetarianism, and suffrage. Her creative writing, poems and fiction were shaped by her politics. Hopkins published creative works and journalistic pieces in advocacy journals such as The Woman's Journal, The Suffragist, and The Woman Voter, radical periodicals such as The Masses, and middlebrow journals such as Harper's, Collier's, and Scribner's, as well as mainstream newspapers and presses like the New York Tribune.

After the United States declared war on Germany in April 1917, the Woman's Peace Party (WPP) supported US intervention except for the New York branch of the party (NYC-WPP). The NYC-WPP's anti-war sentiments appeared in their bi-weekly periodical Four Lights with a gender-based critique of American society and democracy. On July 14, 1917, Hopkins, a member of the NYC-WPP along with other young educated radical reformers, wrote an editorial for Four Lights titled, "What are the War Aims and Peace terms of the American Women?" Hopkins mocked women's involvement in war work in two ways. She first argued against the assumption that women's presumed roles as mothers and wives would prevent them from participating in politics. Secondly, she argued that the work that women did in their lives such as raising their children would end up being pointless because war would lead to the oppression and death of their children in battle. After the United States Department of Justice (DOJ) claimed that two of their issues were traitorous, the post office refused delivery of the journal, the DOJ interrogated the women as the NYC-WPP's anti-war sentiments were seen as unpatriotic, and Four Lights ceased production in October 1917.

== Written works ==
=== Journal and magazine articles ===
Hopkins' articles include:

- December 1904 - "Children's Column", The Woman's Journal, Vol. XXXV, Issue 53
- July 1910 - "Life's Handicapped: An Able Bodied Job for the Crippled Man", The Designer and the Women's Magazine, Vol. XXXII, Issue 3
- December 1911 - "Boundaries of Home", The Woman's Journal, Vol. XLII, Issue 50
  - Original title before being renamed "Woman's Place" in later publications
- May 1912 - "Women March" Collier's The National Weekly
- November 1913 - "Woman's Place", The Woman's Journal, Vol. XLIV, Issue 44
- May 1918 - "The Girls in the Wake of War" The Designer and the Woman's Magazine, Vol. 48, Issue 1
- January 1919 - "Every Baby is Everybody's Baby", The Designer and the Woman's Magazine Vol. 49, Issue 3
- May 1919 - "Women's War Work is Never Done", The Designer and the Woman's Magazine, Vol. 50, Issue 1
- October 1919 - "The Household Assistant", The Designer and the Woman's Magazine, Vol. 50, Issue 6
- July 1921 - "The Woman Citizen", The Woman's Journal, Vol. VI, Issue 5
- August 1921 - "Rubber-Tired Camping", The Designer and the Woman's Magazine, Vol. 54, Issue 3
- December 1921 - "Barriers in Women's Minds", The Woman's Journal
- April 1922 - "Say, Am I Engaged?" The Designer and The Woman's Magazine, Vol. 55, Issue 5
- June 1922 - "The Soup-Dinner Stunt" The Designer and the Woman's Magazine, Vol. 56, Issue 1
- February 1923 - "Why Women Nag", The Designer and the Woman's Magazine, Vol. 57, Issue 3
- March 1923 - "Good Women who are Dishonest", The Designer and the Woman's Magazine, Vol. 57, Issue 4
- April 1923 - "Fifty-Fifty Wives", The Woman's Journal, Vol. VII, Issue 23
- May 1923 - "Love Turns to Hate", The Designer and the Woman's Magazine, Vol. 57, Issue 6
- August 1923 - "How Many Lies Do You Believe?", The Designer and the Woman's Magazine, Vol. 58, Issue 3
- October 1923 - "Love That Devours", The Designer and the Woman's Magazine, Vol. 58, Issue 5

=== Books ===
- Hannah More and Her Circle. Longmans, Green and Co. 1947. ISBN 9780827424647.
- Dr. Johnson's Lichfield. 1952.

==== With Doris Webster ====
- I've Got Your Number. The Century Company. 1927.
- Help Yourself!. The Century Company. 1928.
- Marriage Made Easy. The Century Company. 1928.
- Mrs. Grundy is Dead. The Century Company. 1930. '
- Consider the Consequences!. The Century Company. 1930.
- Dynamite: Or, What Do People Think About You?. The Century Company. 1937.

== Later life and death ==
Some of the writers Hopkins enjoyed reading include Charles Fox Hovey, Richard Le Gallienne, Marie Corelli and Hall Caine, and she enjoyed art of the Pre-Raphaelites. Later in her forties, Hopkins lost faith in protest and rebellion as she noticed that the radicals fighting against these institutions "get no more satisfaction than did the conformists and smugness seemed equally common among both extremes."

Along with the stopped publication of the Four Lights, the mixed results that activists got led to the question of "will it work" becoming her moral code. She insisted that it was "nobody's fault" that "men got the good jobs" and that "virtuous women shriveled at their desks." Hopkins' was uncertain whether life would improve for the younger generation of women coming after her since it took her a longer time for her to reach where she was in her career at that point in her forties compared to a man who got to same place in less time.

Near the end of her life, she lived in Newtown, Connecticut. Hopkins died on November 8, 1960, in Danbury, Connecticut.

== Legacy ==
On August 4, 2016, the Bangor Historical Society hosted a lecture event in the Isaac Farrar Mansion with a descendant of Mary Alden Hopkins, Bill Hopkins, where he spoke about his research into Mary Alden Hopkins' past upbringing and the impact she left behind as a journalist, suffragette, author, and feminist.
