= Santa Fe Mysteries: The Elk Moon Murder =

1996 video game

- Developer: Activision
- Publisher: Activision
- Director: Shannon Gilligan
- Producer: Diana Mack
- Designers: Sam Egan; Shannon Gilligan
- Programmer: Patrick Griffith
- Artist: David Dalzell
- Writer: Shannon Gilligan
- Composer: Tim May
- Platforms: MS-DOS, Macintosh, Windows
- Release: 1996
- Genre: Adventure
- Mode: Single-player

Santa Fe Mysteries: The Elk Moon Murder is a video game, the first in the Santa Fe Mysteries series, followed by Santa Fe Mysteries: Sacred Ground. In The Elk Moon Murder, a famous Native American artist named Anna Elk Moon is murdered in the American Southwest.

== Gameplay ==
The game is a full-motion video adventure game with a point-and-click interface. The player has five days to solve the mystery, and eight hours in each day. Certain actions use up a portion of the time. The player must "listen to the usual suspects, order forensics and shoot photos", and create an arrest warrant by the end of the game.

== Development ==
The game uses the same Activision game engine as Spycraft: The Great Game. The game was distributed by MarkSoft in Poland. The game's original American packaging, which was sent out as a review copy, featured a warning about "clothed sexual touching" on the cover.

The game was created by Shannon Gilligan, who had previously produced the successful Virtual Murder video game series. The game featured actors Amanda Donohoe, Marc Alaimo, and over a dozen Hollywood actors. The scenes were shot on location in Santa Fe, New Mexico.

The project was announced in Electronic Entertainment magazine on September 21, 1995, and in Germany in Power Play Magazine in March 1995. The game cost $1 million to develop. In terms of commercial performance, PC Player speculated that The Elk Moon Murder sold satisfactorily to justify Activision creating a sequel to the title.

== Reception ==
Reception

Review scores
Publication	Score
Computer Gaming World	2/5
PC Zone	72/100
Computer Games Strategy Plus	4/5
PC Games	B+
Quad-City Times	3/4

The game received mixed to positive reviews. Allgame found the game thrilling and enjoyed its strategic elements. MacGamer thought the game was too short in length and too sparse of interactive options. Though Just Adventure concluded that the game was crafted well, they also thought its lack of puzzles made it less of an adventure game. Adventure Classic Gaming negatively compared the game to the "equally uninspiring Virtual Murder series" as a whodunit adventure, and the Police Quest series as a police procedural adventure simulation. Programmer in Black recommended Under a Killing Moon, The Pandora Directive, The Dame Was Loaded, The Broken Sword, and Gabriel Knight as games with similar detective story elements. PC World said the game is a "classic whodunnit with clever scripting and fine acting". Just Adventure noted that the game was interesting, albeit a bit too complicated, especially at the beginning. Coming Soon Magazine complimented the graphics, sounds, storyline, and reasonable price, while responding negatively to the rambling dialogue from suspects. GameSpot recommended players purchase a paperback detective novel instead of this title. Adventure Gamers praised the game's used of Santa Fe as a backdrop to the story. Entertainment Weekly felt the title was "low-budget fare" when compared to The Pandora Directive. PC Zone thought the title was polished and professional, also describing it as superior fun. MacGamer felt the title fell short of Activision's earlier title Spycraft. Gambler Magazine noted the game had simple mechanics but complex gameplay. PC Games felt the multiple choice dialogue mechanic was boring in the long run, nevertheless in a separate issue the reviewer confessed "I can not fault [the game]" in terms of its technical elements. PC Player felt the title was extremely atmospheric and professionally acted, though the magazine negatively compared the game to Golden Gate Killer. PC Action praised the way the title comfortably records all collected information in its in-game journal.

Entertainment Weekly gave the game a C− and wrote that "The game's tag line reads, 'Fear the desert,' but what I really fear is that CD-ROMs like this are replicating cable TV's more arid terrain."

== Legacy ==
Missing in Santa Fe is an online prequel to The Elk Moon Murder, featuring the same setting and many of the same characters. It was presented as an episodic narrative in three parts which commence on Tuesday, June 25, 1996, and continued each week. Additional evidence was presented on Tuesday, July 23. A contest was held with the winners receiving a trip to Santa Fe. The prequel was developed by Newfront Communications, who had previously worked on the mystery website The Case.
