= Santa Fe Mysteries: Sacred Ground =

1997 video game

- Developer: Activision
- Publisher: Activision
- Series: Santa Fe Mysteries
- Platforms: MS-DOS, Macintosh, Windows
- Release: 1997
- Genre: Adventure
- Mode: Single-player

Santa Fe Mysteries: Sacred Ground is a video game, the second in the Santa Fe Mysteries series after The Elk Moon Murder.

== Plot ==
In Sacred Ground, the wife of a local businessman is kidnapped.

== Development ==
The game cost $1 million to develop.

== Reception ==
Reception

Review scores
Publication	Score
PC Games	C
Computer Games Strategy Plus	0.5/5
CNET Gamecenter	4/5

The game received reviews ranging from negative to positive. JustAdventure thought the game was a "slight improvement" over The Elk Moon Murder, while noting "[it] is not entirely easy to classify - somewhere between an interactive movie and an adventure game". In a 2001 retrospective, Programmer in Black wrote, "For an older game, the game play here holds up well." Just Adventure said "There is one thing that [the game] absolutely, positively isn't: unique". Allgame gave Sacred Ground 2.5 stars out of 5. Tekno Magazine noted the annoyance of switching between the game's two CDs when moving back and forth between different locations. PC Player felt the title was a missed opportunity to build on the world created in the predecessor. MacGamer thought the title was serviceable in the genre of interactive murder mysteries, but admitted it was not revolutionary in any way. Adrenaline Vault praised the immersive characters and the atmospheric music.
