= Virtual Murder (video game series) =

Mystery-adventure video game series

- Cover of Virtual Murder 1: Who Killed Sam Rupert?
- Genres: Adventure, murder mystery
- Developer: Creative Media Corporation
- Platforms: Macintosh, Windows
- First release: 1993
- Latest release: 1994

Virtual Murder, renamed as Murder Mystery is a four-part murder mystery adventure video game series developed by Creative Multimedia Corporation. The games were released in 1993 and 1994 for Macintosh and Windows PCs.

== Development ==
In 1993, Creative Multimedia Corporation decided to launch a series of police adventure video games onto the market. They sought a collaboration with Shannon Gilligan, who had a successful career as a screenwriter, novel writer, and children's book author. The series aimed to transform the passive experience of reading a murder mystery into an active multimedia gaming experience. They wanted the player experience to be grounded in realism and to be removed from the magic and science fiction of other detective mysteries. Creative Multimedia announced the games in November 1992. The first entry, Who Killed Sam Rupert? was released in January 1993.

On May 30, 1995, Creative Multimedia Corporation signed a deal with GTE Main Street to allow users of their interactive television network to access Creative Multimedia's CD-ROMs through their home television sets. The Virtual Murder series was among the first to be included because the game could be played using a TV remote control.

== Titles ==
- Virtual Murder 1: Who Killed Sam Rupert? (1993)
- Virtual Murder 2: Who Killed Elspeth Haskard? The Magic Death (1993)
- Murder Mystery 3: Who Killed Brett Penance? The Environmental Surfer (1994)
- Murder Mystery 4: Who Killed Taylor French? The Case of the Undressed Reporter (1994)

== Gameplay and plot ==
Virtual Murder is a series of CD-ROM murder mystery adventure games. The player must solve a murder, and present their findings to a media press conference at the end of the game's time limit. The player determines what items from the crime scene will be fingerprinted or sent to be examined in the lab. The player interviews the leading suspects personally, while an assistant presents recordings of interviews they conducted with other witnesses and potential suspects.

All four games use a standard interface. The player has six hours available to visit the crime scene, perform an autopsy, examine the evidence, and interrogate the suspects. After this, players go to the press conference where they need to get up to 10 questions right to advance to the warrant stage. Here, they can further interrogate three of the suspects, then create a warrant of arrest against one of the suspects. In Who Killed Brett Penance?, there are three different murderers, and the murderer is different in each playthrough.

Lucie Fairwell (initially portrayed by Shannon Gilligan herself and later by Sheryl Lee) serves as a detective sidekick who summarizes the crime scene, provides thumbnail sketches on suspects, and offers an opinion when queried. A throw-back to earlier narrative forms, the character was one of the few examples in interactive media around 2004 of a device called "The Fifth Business", a character who solely exists to move the characters and plot toward the conclusion. There is an occasional voiceover from the police superior who reminds the player of the work yet to be completed and the time remaining on the clock. The games contain an in-game notebook that keeps track of what the player has learned and done, a similar device to that used in the Her Interactive Nancy Drew games.

== Critical reception ==
Allgame reviewer Anthony Baize recommended that players take copious notes and only expect to succeed on their fifth or sixth try because of the relentless press conference and warrant application sections. CD-ROM World (quoted in CDaccess.com) wrote that the games succeeded in illustrating the tools and complexities of murder investigation. Adventure's Planet deemed the series "absolutely mediocre". PC Gamer compared the gameplay to that of Sherlock Holmes: Consulting Detective, though criticized its small video window and grainy footage.

In The End of Books – or Books Without End?, J. Yellowlees Douglas noted that the suspects simply answer the questions to a generic detective, rather than injecting their responses with reactions to an investigator with a colorful personality such as Philip Marlowe or Virginia West. Wired] wrote that the series "proves the rich potential of the mystery genre in the interactive medium", and that "sophisticated multimedia entertainment can be put together on a reasonable budget". Reconceptualizing the Literacies in Adolescents' Lives noted that the series inspired players to create murder mysteries of their own. Computer Gaming World stated that because of their limited interactivity, the Virtual Murder series "is better understood as a work of fiction" than games, and would appeal more to mystery fans than gamers. The magazine described the acting as "surprisingly good", and hoped that "future titles will involve more interactivity ... a promising start" for CMC. CD-ROM Today felt the games have an intuitive interface a graceful design and thought they offered a refreshingly new standard for multimedia games.

MacUser gave Who Killed Brett Penance? and Who Killed Taylor French? scores of 3.5 out of 5, and named them collectively one of 1995's top 50 CD-ROMs.

The series sold 900,000 copies in five languages.

=== Awards and nominations ===
- New Media Invision Award of Excellence for Who Killed Sam Rubert?
- New Media Invision Award of Excellence for Who Killed Elspeth Haskard?
- New Media Invision Award of Excellence for Who Killed Taylor French?
