= R. A. Montgomery =

American writer (1936–2014)

- Born: March 9, 1936; Greenwich, Connecticut, U.S.
- Died: November 9, 2014 (aged 78); Warren, Vermont, U.S.
- Education: Williams College, Yale University, New York University
- Occupation: Author
- Known for: Choose Your Own Adventure
- Partner(s): Shannon Gilligan, Constance Cappel

Raymond Almiran Montgomery Jr. (March 9, 1936 – November 9, 2014) was an American author and key figure in the Choose Your Own Adventure interactive children's book series.

== Early and personal life ==
Montgomery was born in Greenwich, Connecticut on March 9, 1936. Montgomery graduated from Williams College and attended graduate school at Yale University and New York University.

On November 9, 2014, Montgomery died at his home in Warren, Vermont.

== Career ==
Montgomery was an author who contributed many books to the Choose Your Own Adventure series, created in the late 1970s, based on a book manuscript written by Edward Packard and submitted to Montgomery's publishing company. He and his former wife, Constance Cappel, published four books at Vermont Crossroads Press that would later be included in the Bantam "Choose" series (The Cave of Time, Journey Under the Sea, By Balloon to the Sahara, and Space and Beyond). Montgomery penned more than 50 books for this series and its various offspring, including books in a series for younger readers.

The Choose Your Own Adventure series published 184 titles through Bantam Books between 1979 and 1998, including many by Montgomery himself and several by his sons Ramsey and Anson. It was one of the most popular children's series of all time, with over 250 million books in print.

Montgomery and partner Shannon Gilligan reissued some books of the initial "Choose" series through Chooseco LLC, in Waitsfield, Vermont. The re-release was featured in the LA Times and Newsweek magazine, and an electronic version of the first book in the relaunch, The Abominable Snowman, was available as an interactive download for iPod. Montgomery said that he wanted to travel and encourage culturally distinct Choose Your Own Adventure books from writers and illustrators in all parts of the world.

== Other projects ==
- A six book non-interactive series for young adult readers entitled Trio
- A CD-ROM, Beyond the Wall of Stars
- Windows/Mac software, Comic Creator (1995)
