= Choose Your Own Adventure =

Book series

- The Cave of Time by Edward Packard, the first book in the CYOA series
- Cover artist: Paul Granger
- Language: English
- Genre: Gamebook
- Publisher: Bantam Books
- Published: 1979–1998 (original series)
- Media type: Print
- No. of books: 184 (original series) (List of books)

Choose Your Own Adventure (CYOA) is a children's gamebook series written in the second person, where the reader assumes the protagonist's role and thereby makes choices determining the plot. The series was based upon a concept created by Edward Packard and originally published by Constance Cappel's and R. A. Montgomery's Vermont Crossroads Press as the "Adventures of You" series, starting with Packard's Sugarcane Island in 1976.

Choose Your Own Adventure, as published by Bantam Books, was one of the most popular children's series during the 1980s and 1990s, selling more than 250 million copies between 1979 and 1998. The series has been translated into 40 languages. When Bantam, now owned by Random House, allowed the Choose Your Own Adventure trademark to lapse, the series was relaunched by Chooseco. Chooseco began to reissue titles by Packard in August of 2025.

== Format ==
Originally created for 7- to 14-year-olds, the books are written in the second person. The protagonist—that is, the reader—takes on a role relevant to the adventure, such as a private investigator, mountain climber, race-car driver, doctor, or spy. Certain books in the series allow readers to choose which role they take. For example, in an adventure book, readers may be prompted to choose between a climber, a hiker, or a traveler. Stories are generally gender- and race-neutral, though in some cases, particularly in illustrations, there is the presumption of a male reader (the target demographic group). In some stories, the protagonist is implied to be a child, whereas in other stories, the protagonist is an adult.

The stories are formatted so that, after a few pages of reading, the protagonist faces two or three options, each of which leads to further pages and further options, and so on until they arrive at one of the many story endings. The number of endings varies from as many as 44 in the early titles to as few as 7 in later adventures. Likewise, there is no clear pattern among the various titles regarding the number of pages per ending, the ratio of good to bad endings, or the reader's progression backwards and forwards through the pages of the book. This allows for a realistic sense of unpredictability, and leads to the possibility of repeat readings, which is one of the distinguishing features of the books.

As the series progressed, both Packard and Montgomery experimented with the gamebook format, sometimes introducing unexpected twists such as endless page loops or trick endings. Examples include the "paradise planet" ending in Inside UFO 54-40, which can only be reached by cheating or turning to the wrong page by accident. (Note: Under a special warning on page 1 of Inside UFO 54-40, the reader is informed that they may hear about Ultima, the planet of paradise, and that "no one can get there by making choices or following instructions". There is no choice whatsoever to get to the Ultima ending on page 101, which begins, "You did not make a choice, or follow any direction, but now, somehow, you are descending from space—approaching [Ultima]".) The only way out of this is to "reset", or close the book and start over from the first page.

== History ==
According to Packard, the core idea for the series emerged from bedtime stories that he told to his daughters, revolving around a character named Pete and his adventures: "I had a character named Pete and I usually had him encountering all these different adventures on an isolated island. But that night I was running out of things for Pete to do, so I just asked what they would do". His two daughters came up with different paths for the story to take and Packard thought up an ending for each of the paths: "What really struck me was the natural enthusiasm they had for the idea. And I thought: 'Could I write this down?'"

Packard soon developed this basic premise into a manuscript titled The Adventures of You on Sugar Cane Island. He set out in 1970 to find a publisher but was rejected by nine publishing companies, causing him to shelve the idea. In 1975, he was able to convince Ray Montgomery, co-owner of Vermont Crossroads Press, to publish the book and it sold 8,000 copies, a large amount for a small local publishing house. The series was later marketed to Pocket Books, where it also sold well, but Montgomery believed that it would sell better if a bigger publisher could be found. After some discussion, Montgomery was able to make a contract for the series with Bantam Books. Packard and Montgomery were selected to write books for the series, including the contracting out of titles to additional authors.

The series was highly successful after it began to be published by Bantam Books. A 1981 article in The New York Times, followed by an interview with Packard on The Today Show, provided free publicity.

By the 1990s, the series faced competition from computer games and was in a decline. The series was discontinued in 1999, but was relaunched by a new company, Chooseco, in 2003.

In June 2018, Z-Man Games issued a licensed co-operative board game called Choose Your Own Adventure: House of Danger inspired by R. A. Montgomery's book in the series.

In January 2019, Chooseco initiated a trademark infringement legal challenge against Netflix for the film Black Mirror: Bandersnatch. Netflix settled the suit in November 2020.

== List of books ==
From 1979 to 1998, Bantam Books published 184 Choose Your Own Adventure books.

== Reception ==
Writing for Smithsonian, Jackie Mansky noted the popularity of the series despite having a "formulaic style", also quoting an English scholar as stating, "in terms of literary quality, many of the multiple-storyline books are true skunks." Mansky further noted that "it's important to remember that the series was marketed toward children, who loved the straight-forward simplicity of the questions."

== In other media ==
=== Films ===
Choose Your Own Adventure: The Abominable Snowman is a 2006 animated interactive DVD movie based on the gamebook of the same name by R. A. Montgomery.

In May 2026, a live film adaptation is being developed by 20th Century Studios with Radio Silence to direct and Tom Bissell to write.

== Other notable series ==
- Endless Quest
- Fighting Fantasy
- Give Yourself Goosebumps
- Grailquest
- Lone Wolf
- The Garden of Forking Paths
- Twistaplot
- Usborne Puzzle Adventure series

== See also ==
- Visual novel
- Interactive fiction
