= Edward Packard (writer) =

American author (born 1931)

- Born: Edward Burtt Packard, Jr. February 16, 1931 (age 95); Huntington, New York, US
- Occupations: Author, writer, lawyer
- Spouse: Rosa Barret Covington (div.)
- Relatives: David Corenswet (grandson)
- Writing career
- Genres: Adventure, interactive fiction, children's literature, poetry, essays

Edward Burtt Packard Jr. (born February 16, 1931) is an American author, creator of the Choose Your Own Adventure book concept and author of more than 175 books in the series. The genre that Packard invented, in which the reader chooses what happens, has come to be called "interactive fiction". Packard wrote many other children's books as well, and is also a lawyer, essayist, and poet. He continues to write books, and blogs regularly on his website, edwardpackard.com.

Packard came up with the original idea of writing interactive second-person fiction — in which the reader is the protagonist ("you are the hero") and makes choices that affect how the story unfolds — while he was thinking up bedtime stories for his children. (While telling them a story, making it up as he went along, he would enlist their help by pausing to ask them, "What do you think happened next?", and they would each have different ideas about how they wanted the story to proceed.) After he published the first three books in this format, originally called "The Adventures of You", Bantam Books offered him and his first publisher a contract for a series, rebranded and made famous as the Choose Your Own Adventure series of children's books.

== Life and career ==
=== Personal life ===
Packard was born in Huntington, New York, the son of Charlotte Eden (Burne) and Edward Burtt Packard. He is a graduate of Princeton University and Columbia Law School.

Packard is the grandfather of actor David Corenswet.

=== Early career ===
Packard wrote the first known book of this type, Sugarcane Island, in 1969, and arranged for it to be published in 1976 by Vermont Crossroads Press, owned by Constance Cappel and Raymond A. Montgomery Jr. Packard explains in the foreword to the book that he developed what he originally called "the adventures of you" fiction format while trying to think up interesting bedtime stories for his three children (Caroline, Andrea, and Wells). In Sugarcane Island, the shipwrecked reader travels around the titular island, making a choice about how to proceed on almost every page (for example, if a reader chooses to walk along the sandy beach, they are told to turn to page 3; if they choose to climb up the rocky hill, they must turn instead to page 5). The possible stories to choose from branch out like a tree within the book; the story that the reader follows unfolds differently depending on the choices they make. Readers confront different dangers or treasures at every turn, depending on their choices. Many of the possible endings feature an unfortunate demise, although escape from the island is possible if the correct choices are made.

=== Choose Your Own Adventure ===
The Adventures of You on Sugarcane Island, and Packard's next two books in the genre, Deadwood City and The Third Planet From Altair (published in 1977 and 1978 by Lippincott), were the exact prototypes for the books in Bantam's classic Choose Your Own Adventure series, in which Packard participated as one of the main authors.

In 1969 and 1970, the William Morris Agency had submitted the book on Packard's behalf to several major publishers, all of whom had rejected it. But in 1976, Packard was able to get the book published by Vermont Crossroads Press. In its review of the book, Publishers Weekly called it "an original idea, well carried out."

When Lippincott published Packard's next two books in the same genre, Deadwood City and The Third Planet from Altair, their covers alerted readers to their unusual nature with the rubrics "Choose Your Own Adventure in the Wild West" and "Choose Your Own Adventure in Outer Space". Because at the time the format was so unusual, readers were warned at the outset not to read the book straight through, but to follow the pages corresponding to their choices.

Seeing potential in Packard's idea of an "interactive book", Bantam Books launched a series called Choose Your Own Adventure in 1979. This contact with Bantam Books was made by Constance Cappel on a flight to the Atlanta ABA Conference with Bantam's then head of marketing, Jack Romano. (Vermont Crossroads Press, having earlier sold the rights to the series to Pocket Books, now had them transferred to Bantam.) Packard wrote the first book in the Bantam series, The Cave of Time, a time-traveling story in which the reader explores a cavern that is a portal to different eras. Both R. A. Montgomery, Packard's original publisher at Vermont Crossroads Press, and Packard wrote many more books in the series, with Packard contributing well over 60 titles by 1998, when the series ended.

Packard kept the Choose Your Own Adventure series fresh by changing genres with each title. After the time-travel story, he wrote a spy story, a space opera, a western, a mystery, a science fiction story, and a fantasy. In one of his books, Hyperspace, Packard himself appears as a character (a case of "self-insertion").

Packard was the only CYOA author who included a recurring character in many of his books: a scientist, Dr. Nera Vivaldi, frequently appeared in the role of a friend to the reader. Seemingly ageless, she appears in stories set in many different time periods, including those that take the reader into outer space. In Hyperspace, Dr. Vivaldi breaches the fourth wall by acknowledging that she is a fictional character whom the reader may recognize from having read other CYOA books.

Beginning in 2012, Simon & Schuster released revised and expanded print versions of selected Packard CYOA stories: Through the Black Hole, Return to the Cave of Time and The Forbidden Castle, under the trademark "U-Ventures".

The six books in the Space Hawks series, which focuses on Earth's defense against space aliens, were published in mainland China in 2004 in anticipation of China's first crewed space mission.

=== Book applications ===
In 2010, Packard started a new company called U-Ventures, which began releasing Choose-Your-Own-Adventure-style applications for iPhone and iPad based on some of Packard's books. The first title, "Return to the Cave of Time", was released in August 2010.
