= The Egyptian Trilogy =

The Egyptian Trilogy is a 1982 role-playing game adventure published by Yaquinto Publications for Man, Myth & Magic.

== Plot summary ==
The Egyptian Trilogy is an adventure in which a three-part adventure set in Akhenaton's Egypt features chariot rules, 31 new character classes, and new spells, magic items, poisons, weapons, and armor.

== Publication history ==
Shannon Appelcline explained that "Man, Myth & Magic [...] offered players the opportunity to reincarnate into many different historic eras. The initial game was set in Ancient Rome but The Egyptian Trilogy (1982) offered a new era during the reign of Pharaoh Akhenaton. Accurate maps of Stonehenge and the Great Pyramids of Egypt further pushed this real-world veracity."

The Egyptian Trilogy was written by Herbie Brennan and published by Yaquinto Publications in 1982 as an 84-page book with an outer folder.
