= Newgrange Reactivated =

Newgrange Reactivated is a 1983 role-playing game adventure published by Yaquinto Publications for Man, Myth & Magic.

== Plot summary ==
Newgrange Reactivated is an adventure in which the player characters reactivate Newgrange's ancient power and are instantly transported to a long‑lost continent.

== Publication history ==
Newgrange Reactivated was written by Herbie Brennan and published by Yaquinto Publications in 1983 as a 24-page book with an outer folder. This scenario is Episode 7 of Adventure 1.
