= Kingdom of the Sidhe =

Tabletop role-playing game supplement

Cover art, 1982

The Kingdom of the Sidhe is an adventure published by Yaquinto Publications in 1982 for the fantasy role-playing game Man, Myth & Magic.

== Plot summary ==
Having travelled to Hibernia in a previous episode and rescued the child Setanta, the adventurers later returned to find Setanta, now an adolescent, ravaging the countryside at the head of a band of renegades. Setanta has also offered an alliance to the Sidhe. To counter this and bring Setanta to bay, the adventurers entered the land of the Sidhe in the previous adventure and braved the Maze of Death to prove themselves worthy of an audience. In this episode, the adventurers must venture through the kingdom of the Sidhe, overcoming several challenges along the way.

== Publication history ==
Yaquinto Publications had released the Man, Myth & Magic role-playing game in January 1982, and included with the rules were the first four "episodes" of a campaign called "Adventure 1". Later the same year, Yaquinto also published the fifth and sixth episodes as stand-alone adventures. The sixth episode was a 20-page book with an outer folder called Death to Setanta, written by Herbie Brennan and Stephen Peek.

== Reception ==
In the May 1983 edition of White Dwarf (Issue #41), Marcus L. Rowland reviewed Man, Myth & Magic, as well as Episodes 5 and 6 (Death to Setanta and Kingdom of the Sidhe.) Rowland was not impressed with any of the products, calling them "too derivative, simplistic and ambiguous, and do not give a realistic feeling of the ancient world." Focussing specifically on the adventures, Rowland criticized them because they "allow the players too little free will, although the detailed explanations and descriptions may help novice referees." However, Rowland found that The Kingdom of the Sidhe "was the most enjoyable scenario of those I saw," rating it somewhat playable, somewhat enjoyable, requiring some skill to play, and had some complexity of plot. Rowland concluded by giving The Kingdom of the Sidhe a below average rating of 6 out of 10.
