= The Glastonbury Labyrinth =

The Glastonbury Labyrinth is a 1982 role-playing game adventure published by Yaquinto Publications for Man, Myth & Magic.

== Plot summary ==
The Glastonbury Labyrinth is an adventure scenario set in England, centering on Glastonbury and its historic abbey.

== Publication history ==
The Glastonbury Labyrinth was written by Herbie Brennan and published by Yaquinto Publications in 1982 as a 24-page book with an outer folder. This scenario is Episode 8 of Adventure 1.

== Reception ==
The supplement was rated a 6/9 by readers of The Space Gamer.
