= Death to Setanta =

Tabletop role-playing game supplement

Cover art, 1982

Death to Setanta is an adventure published by Yaquinto Publications in 1982 for the fantasy role-playing game Man, Myth & Magic.

== Plot summary ==
Having travelled to Hibernia in a previous episode and rescued the child Setanta, the adventurers return in this episode to find Setanta, now an adolescent, ravaging the countryside at the head of a band of renegades. Setanta has also offered an alliance to the Sidhe. To counter this and bring Setanta to bay, the adventurers must enter the land of the Sidhe and brave the Maze of Death to prove themselves worthy of an audience.

== Publication history ==
Yaquinto Publications had released the Man, Myth & Magic role-playing game in January 1982, and included with the rules were the first four "episodes" of a campaign called "Adventure 1". Later the same year, Yaquinto also published the fifth and sixth episodes to complete Adventure 1. The fifth episode was a 24-page book with an outer folder called Death to Setanta, written by Herbie Brennan and Stephen Peek.

== Reception ==
In the May 1983 edition of White Dwarf (Issue #41), Marcus L. Rowland reviewed Man, Myth & Magic, as well as Episodes 5 and 6 (Death to Setanta and Kingdom of the Sidhe.) Rowland was not impressed with any of the products, calling them "too derivative, simplistic and ambiguous, and do not give a realistic feeling of the ancient world." Focussing specifically on the adventures, Rowland criticized them because they "allow the players too little free will, although the detailed explanations and descriptions may help novice referees." Rowland also commented that Death to Setanta had "several major anachronisms which cannot be described without revealing details of the module." He warned that anyone wanting to play its sequel, The Kingdom of the Sidhe, would be required to have this adventure, since it was "almost impossible to run the [next adventure] without information in this module." He concluded that Death to Setanta was not very playable, not very enjoyable, did not require a great deal of skill, and lacked complexity of plot. Rowland gave Death to Setanta a very poor rating of 4 out of 10.
