= 88: A Tactical Game of Armored Combat on the North African Front, 1940-1942 =

1980 WWII board wargame

- Cover art by Rodger B. MacGowan, 1980
- Designers: James M. Day
- Illustrators: Rodger B. MacGowan
- Publishers: Yaquinto Publications
- Publication: 1980
- Genres: World War II

88: A Tactical Game of Armored Combat on the North African Front, 1940-1942 is a board wargame published by Yaquinto Publications in 1980 that simulates the North African campaign between British and Axis forces during World War II. The game is the second in a series of three games with a focus on armored combat that all use versions of the same rules system.

== Description ==
88 is a two-player board wargame in which one player controls Axis forces and the other player controls British forces.

=== Components ===
The game comes with an illustrated 40-page rulebook, 509 counters, and 50 data cards that describe all relevant combat information about every tank, vehicle, artillery unit and infantry unit in the game. The game is played on a six-piece geomorphic hex grid map scaled at 50 metres (55 yd) per hex. Counters representing landscape can be added to the map to customize the map board.

=== Gameplay ===
The rules system was developed for this game's predecessor, Panzer, with the addition of special rules for the desert terrain and conditions. There are three levels of rules:

- Armor Game: The simplest, using only armored vehicles and armor-piercing weapons
- Advanced Game: Adds infantry, towed weapons, non-armored vehicles, and General Purpose fire
- Optional Rules: Many optional rules are available in 28 categories, including morale, ammo limits, off-board artillery, and command control)

The game uses a simultaneous movement system, requiring both players to plot movement and as well as planning the direct fire that each tank, artillery gun or squad will make during the turn. Because of the simultaneous movement, critic Loren Bird noted the severe limits placed on the number of units used in any scenario, saying, "Unfortunately, a simove [simultaneous movement] approach limits the size of the games, so the use of battalions (as in Squad Leader) is beyond the game's scope, and rules out many of the larger miniatures battles."

During the movement plotting phase of each turn, players can also designate units to focus on opportunity fire "trip wires" — if an enemy unit crosses the trip wire, units focused on it may fire on the intruder.

After players have finished movement, the remainder of the turn is made up of two phases:

- Direct fire: Both players conduct direct fire simultaneously.
- Movement: All units programmed to move do so. (Opportunity fire happens in this phase should an enemy unit cross a designated "trip wire".)

In order to calculate whether a tank successfully hits another tank, the attacking player must gather data from the data cards of both tanks, and calculate distance and angle. (Rangefinder measuring sticks and angle gauges are included.) Terrain and movement also factor into the calculation. (Critic Eric Goldberg wrote, "Everything but the horoscope of the tank commander is factored into fire.") The calculations provide the attacking tank with an armor penetration strength, which is compared to the defending tank's protection rating. If the attacker's penetration strength is higher than protection rating, the shell hits, and the attacking player rolls a die to see where the target has been struck and what the result is.

Each turn represents 20–90 seconds of game time.

=== Scenarios ===
The game comes with four scenarios that critic Steve List called "rather loosely structured."

== Publication history ==
In 1979, Yaquinto simultaneously introduced their first eight games at Gencon XII. One of those games was Panzer, a World War II tank combat game set on the Russian Front that had been designed by James M. Day. The following year, Yaquinto introduced a sequel, 88, that used the same rules system. It was also designed by Day, and featured cover art by Rodger B. MacGowan.

Later the same year, Yaquinto published a third game in the series, Armor, that was set in Western Europe.

== Reception ==
In Issue 101 of Campaign, Steve List noted that "AP [armor-piercing] fire is fairly complex to resolve", and then described the nine-step process to determine a hit and damage. List thought the rules were "generally good, and though at times complicated, fairly easy to grasp." List did have issue with the morale rules that require a unit to move randomly if panicked, writing, "This headless chicken type of run-around is a throwback to the bad ol' days at SPI, and compares unfavourably to state of the art morale procedures, such as those in the Squad Leader game system." List also questioned the line-of-sight rules for units behind a dune or crest. Despite these problems, List concluded, "All in all, 88 is a very good tactical game on desert warfare. While slightly less detailed than Tobruk, it plays faster and is capable of portraying more varied combat situations ... it will probably remain the best game of its type on the market for quite some time."

== Other recognition ==
A copy of 88 is held in the collection of the Strong National Museum of Play, donated by Darwin Bromley.

== Other reviews and commentary ==
- Fire & Movement #28
