= Man, Myth & Magic (role-playing game) =

Tabletop fantasy role-playing game

- 1st edition box cover
- Designers: James Herbert Brennan
- Publishers: Yaquinto Publications
- Publication: 1982
- Genres: Fantasy
- Systems: Custom

Man, Myth & Magic is a fantasy role-playing game originally published by Yaquinto Publications in 1982, now published by Precis Intermedia.

== Gameplay ==
Man, Myth & Magic is set in historical times on Earth, drawing on myths and legends from 4000 BC to 400 AD.

Character generation is determined randomly, including nationality, race, and character traits (strength, speed, endurance, intelligence, courage, and skill). Because of the randomness of nationality and race, which can range from ancient Britain to the Far East, there is a little chance that a party of adventurers will represent a historically accurate mix of characters. Combat and skill checks are made using percentile dice, generating a number between 1 and 100.

The game components are: a box containing three rulebooks ("Basic Rules", "Advanced Rules", and "Adventures" which contained suggested scenarios), dice, blank character sheets, and adventure maps.

== Publication history ==
Yaquinto Publications made a name for itself as a board wargame publisher with games like The Ironclads and Swashbuckler. But in 1982, Yaquinto decided to enter the role-playing game market with Man, Myth & Magic, designed by James Herbert Brennan. This was followed by a number of adventures.

== Reception ==
Reviewers were not impressed with Man, Myth & Magic.

Tony Watson, in the October–November 1982 issue of Different Worlds (#25), commented that the game offers nothing new and makes many historical errors in terms of the Emperors of Rome and the coinage used. He suggested that the game could be improved by the inclusion of a bibliography.

In the February 1983 edition of The Space Gamer (Issue No. 60), Russell Grant Collins did not recommend the game, saying, "If the idea of a FRPG set in the days of the Roman Empire intrigues you, I'd recommend you create one yourself, using whatever system you like best. If Yaquinto lowered the price... then I could recommend this game; but as it is, it's not worth it."

In the May 1983 edition of White Dwarf (issue #41), Marcus Rowland reviewed this game along with two published adventures: Adventure 1, Episode 5 - Death to Setanta and Adventure 1, Episode 6 - The Kingdom of the Sidhe. Rowland found the rules disorganized, relevant material hard to locate, and the game system too simplistic to be interesting. He gave the game and the adventures below average ratings of 5/10, 4/10 and 6/10 respectively.

In the December 1983 edition of Dragon Magazine (Issue #80), Ken Rolston found "the poor game design and wordy style make the game unpleasant reading, comparing unfavorably with most other published FRP game systems." Rolston liked the idea of exploring Earth's history, but found that the game couldn't decide whether it wanted to be historically accurate, or a fantasy. "Anyone who mistakenly buys the game expecting historical accuracy or simulation will be disappointed. It is not that there is no history at all in the game; to the contrary, there is a great deal of historically accurate material about the men, myths, and magicks of ancient Earth. The problem is that there are too many distracting anachronisms and fabrications (like a tyrannosaurus in Rome) to take the historical material seriously." Rolston concluded with a thumbs down: "I've found no other system as disappointing... I cannot even recommend the game as an ambitious failure — there is little new or unconventional in the systems or design."

Although the game had been out of print for several years before game critic Rick Swan wrote his 1990 book The Complete Guide to Role-Playing Games, he warned that used copies abounded, and that "potential buyers should be forewarned to keep their distance ... there's nothing even remotely plausible about the concept, since Nazis can pop up in ancient Rome as easily as a mastodon might trample the soldiers at Gettysburg". Swan found the character generation system "absurd", and that gameplay was at the mercy of "a mishmash of awkward ill-conceived game mechanics." Swan concluded by giving the game a very poor rating of only 1.5 out of 4, saying "There are some nice graphics ... but they hardly justify the purchase of a game this muddled."

In his 2014 book Designers & Dragons: The 80s, game historian Shannon Appelcline noted that despite the bad reviews, this game was noteworthy as "the earliest notable RPG to really take a solid look at historical roleplaying." Applecline also pointed out that Man, Myth, & Magic was "one of the earliest RPGs to provide truly serialized adventures" and that it "went further, providing tighter connections between adventures, and even cliffhangers at the end of each supplement".

== Released products ==
- 4306 - Man, Myth & Magic (1982, Boxed Set - Includes items 4300-4305)
- 4300 - Dice
- 4301 - Book 1 - Basic Rules Book
- 4302 - Book 2 - Advanced Rules Book
- 4303 - Book 3 - The Adventures Book (Begins campaign with Adventure 1, Episodes 1-4)
- 4304 - Character Pad
- 4305 - Adventure Maps
- 4307 - Adventure 1, Episode 5 - Death to Setanta
- 4308 - Adventure 1, Episode 6 - Kingdom of the Sidhe
- 4309 - Adventure 1, Episode 7 - Newgrange Reactivated
- 4310 - Adventure 1, Episode 8 - The Glastonbury Labyrinth
- 4311 - Adventure 1, Episode 9 - Ascent to Hell (Final episode)
- 4312 - Adventure 2 - The Egyptian Trilogy (3 episode, standalone adventure)
- 4313 - Adventure 3 - Werewolf of Europe (1 episode, standalone adventure)
- 4314 - Adventure 4 - Norse Trilogy (never published)

== Re-release ==
Precis Intermedia Gaming re-released Man, Myth & Magic in PDF format on DriveThruRPG on June 21, 2019.
