= Ascent to Hell =

Ascent to Hell is a 1983 role-playing game adventure published by Yaquinto Publications for Man, Myth & Magic.

== Plot summary ==
Ascent to Hell is an adventure in which the player characters take a through space to Venus.

== Publication history ==
Ascent to Hell was written by Herbie Brennan and published by Yaquinto Publications in 1983 as a 24-page book with an outer folder. This scenario is Episode 9 of Adventure 1.

== Reviews ==
- Children at Risk
- Complete Guide to RP Games
