= The Beastlord =

Board game

The Beastlord is a fantasy board game published by Yaquinto Publications in 1979.

== Gameplay ==
The Beastlord is a fantasy game for 2 to 4 players who take the part of one of the warring factions in the valley of Cym Bel Eanon: elves, goblins, humans and beasts. Players can choose to play the tactical combat game between individual units, or the larger strategic combat game between armies.

=== Components ===
The game box contains

- 28" x 22" strategic hex grid map board scaled at 1 mile (1.6 km) per hex
- 28" x 22" tactical map board scaled at 50 m (55 yd) per hex
- 600 counters
- rule booklet
- counter tray
- two six-sided dice

== Production history ==
The Beastlord, designed by Michael S. Matheny, was one of the eight inaugural games published by Yaquinto Games in 1979. Several of Yaquinto's first games suffered from unforeseen problems with the rules, and several like The Ironclads and The Beastlord required Yaquinto to immediately issue a revised second edition rulebook.

== Reception ==
In the inaugural issue of Ares Magazine, Steve List was unimpressed by The Beastlord, especially as a two- or three-player game, giving it a rating of only 4 out of 9. "The only truly defective component is the rules booklet, which leaves out crucial information. Beast Lord is really a four-player game, and mediocre at that.".

In the July 1980 edition of Dragon, Bill Fawcett was generally pleased by The Beastmaster. He did note that the switching between tactical and strategic combat was "time consuming", and that "One of the greatest drawbacks (or advantages) of this game is that it was obviously not designed to be played in a few hours. The Beastlord is most definitely a campaign game with all the attendant problems and greater degree of sophistication that the larger time scope allows." He concluded that "[This] is a well integrated and eminently playable package... a fairly complicated game that takes a substantial commitment of time to play... There is almost always enough happening to keep the interest level high even over the many hours it takes to play. If you have a few friends with whom you enjoy maintaining an extended game, you should find The Beastlord enjoyable and entertaining."

In the August 1980 edition of The Space Gamer (No. 30), Stephen Carl also found the rules to be lacking but perhaps worth the time to improve, saying, ""If you don't mind wading through poorly written rules and making up some of your own superficial ones, then this game could be fun and entertaining for any fantasy board game addict. Recommended."

In Issue 27 of Phoenix (September–October 1980), Roger Musson thought the introductory story in the first edition's rulebook that was meant to set the mood and setting "entirely fails." He also pointed out several problems with the geography of the map, including rivers that flow uphill. More seriously, Musson found some major problems with the rules. But his biggest complaint about the game was "the objectives, which pure and simple, are destruction [...] Everything directs towards a bloodbath." He concluded by advising players to wait for the second edition rules.
