= Sagas of the Demonspawn =

Gamebook series

Sagas of the Demonspawn is a four issue gamebook series written by J. H. Brennan and illustrated by Geoff Taylor (first two books) and John Blanche (latter two).

The books feature a protagonist named Fire*Wolf [sic] in a continuing storyline. Unusual for gamebooks, the series is written in third person past tense.

The books have been translated into Danish, dropping the asterisk from the name of the protagonist. The Italian, French and Spanish versions didn't drop it.

== Books in the series ==
1. Fire*Wolf (1984)
2. The Crypts of Terror (1984)
3. Demondoom (1985)
4. Ancient Evil (1985)

== Reception ==
While the series has been criticized for having an ill-designed combat system, the first two books have been praised for the quality of the writing and for targeting an older audience than most gamebooks (such as Brennan's GrailQuest series). Conversely, the latter two books have been described as being "nightmarishly difficult" and having "rushed" writing.
