= Murfreesboro (disambiguation) =

Murfreesboro is a city and the county seat of Rutherford County in Tennessee.

Murfreesboro may also refer to:

== Cities ==
- Murfreesboro, Arkansas, Pike County, Arkansas
- Murfreesboro, North Carolina, Hertford County, North Carolina

== Military ==
- Any of three battles in the American Civil War
  - First Battle of Murfreesboro (July 13, 1862)
  - The Second Battle of Murfreesboro or the Battle of Stones River (December 31, 1862, to January 2, 1863)
  - Third Battle of Murfreesboro (December 5–7, 1864)

== Other ==
- Murfreesboro (wargame), a 1979 board wargame that simulates the first day of the Battle of Stones River
