= Time War =

Time War can refer to:

- Temporal war, a fictional conflict that takes place in multiple time periods, instigated by factions in the future who then travel back and alter history to their own ends
- Time War (Doctor Who), an event in the fictional Doctor Who universe
- Time War, a module in the Nintendo game Meteos
- Time War (novel), a 1974 science fiction novel by Lin Carter
- Time War (board game), a time travel wargame published in 1979 by Yaquinto

== See also ==
- Temporal Cold War, in the Star Trek universe
