= Timeship =

A timeship is a kind of time machine, often seen in time travel science fiction.

Timeship can also refer to:

- Timeship (role-playing game), a 1983 role-playing game by Yaquinto Publications
- TIMESHIP #39, a traveling environmental justice museum from the future run by Delta Collaborative.
- Timeship, a life extension research facility proposed by Saul Kent and architect Stephen Valentine

== See also ==
- The Time Ships, a 1995 novel by Stephen Baxter
- Time travel in fiction
