= Adventurer (board game) =

Board game

- Publishers: Yaquinto Publications
- Publication: 1980

Adventurer is a 1980 board game published by Yaquinto Publications.

== Gameplay ==
Adventurer is a game about brawling between combatants using futuristic weaponry in science fiction scenarios, and features the same game mechanics as Swashbuckler.

== Reception ==
Paul O'Connor reviewed Adventurer in The Space Gamer No. 45. O'Connor commented that "Adventurer is worth your time if you've never played Swashbuckler, or if you'd like to see a few new innovations on the latter. It can be a lot of fun to match French swordsmen against a blaster-armed octopus man, especially if you have a demented mind."

Alan E. Paull reviewed Adventurer for White Dwarf #30, giving it an overall rating of 8 out of 10, and stated that "The game does not suffer from either the poor quality of production or the quirks and inconsistencies in the rules of play, which flaw so many games on the market. That it is enjoyable to play and requires considerable thought and skill from the players (as well as a suitably anarchic spirit) adds even more to its credit, but its refreshing originality is its chief asset."
