= Dallas: A Game of the Ewing Family =

1980 board game

A Game of the Ewing Family
- Designers: Stephen Peek
- Publishers: Yaquinto Publications
- Publication: 1980
- Genres: Family game

Dallas: A Game of the Ewing Family is a board game published by Yaquinto Publications in 1980 that is based on the American television series Dallas.

== Background ==
Dallas was an American prime time soap opera that aired on CBS from 1978 to 1991. The series revolved around an affluent and feuding Texas family, the Ewings, who owned the independent oil company Ewing Oil and the cattle-ranching land of Southfork. When someone shot the despicable J.R. Ewing in the second season cliffhanger finale, the series reached its peak popularity; the premiere of the third season, "Who Done It" remains the second-highest-rated primetime telecast ever. Several game publishers tried to cash in on this popularity, including Simulations Publications Inc. (SPI) with Dallas: The Television Role-Playing Game (1980), and Yaquinto with their family board game Dallas: A Game of the Ewing Family.

== Description ==
Dallas is a board game for 2–7 players where each player is a member of the Ewing family who attempts to become the president of the Ewing family business and eventually gain complete control by forcing everyone else out of the game.

=== Gameplay ===
Each player receives a counter illustrated with a photograph of one member of the Ewing family. Players roll the dice to circle a board, looking for money, stocks and blackmail cards. Trading of assets between players is allowed. At family board meetings, family members use votes and proxies to try to seize control of the President's chair. A player holding a complete set of blackmail cards can force the blackmailed player to vote for the blackmailer.

== Publication history ==
At the height of the Dallas television series in 1980, Yaquinto attempted to cash in on the show's popularity by publishing a licensed board game, Dallas: A Game of the Ewing Family, designed by J. Stephen Peek. As with other Yaquinto games, this one was packaged in a double LP-style folder. Yaquinto also licensed foreign-language versions of the game, including German, French, Swedish and Finnish editions.

== Reception ==
In Issue 49 of the British wargaming magazine Perfidious Albion, Charles Vasey called this "a cheapo version of Monopoly. You zoom around a really neat map of 'Dallas' which is very amusing (do look closely at it) picking up blackmail cards and stocks in various companies." Vasey compared this board game to SPI's Dallas: The Role-playing Game and concluded, "[Yaquinto's game is] better on the atmosphere, but frankly folks, is this really what you want to play?"
