= The Great Redoubt =

1979 Napoleonic board wargame

Box art from a 1979 edition of the game

The Great Redoubt, subtitled " A Game of the Battle of Borodino – 1812" is a board wargame published by Yaquinto Publications in 1979 that simulates the Battle of Borodino.

== Background ==
In June 1812, Napoleon invaded Russia and forced Russian forces to retreat. By September, French forces had advanced to the outskirts of Moscow, where the Russians made a stand, setting up a strong defensive position near the small village of Borodino. After a fierce battle with heavy losses on both sides, the Russians made an orderly retreat, opening the road to Moscow and providing Napoleon with a Pyrrhic victory. Although the French briefly occupied Moscow, the oncoming winter and lack of supplies forced the French to immediately withdraw from Russia, resulting in the loss of a significant portion of the French army to disease, cold and starvation during the retreat.

== Description ==
The Great Redoubt is a two-player board wargame in which one player controls French forces and the other player controls Russian forces. With 315 counters, a large hex grid map, and a 24-page rulebook, the game has been characterized as "of more than moderate complexity."

=== Gameplay ===
The game uses a complex sequence of play, which includes mutual fire or melee, routs following failed morale checks and possible advances after melee. Critic Ian Chadwick noted that "Numerous small rules cover a host of possible situations and modifications to the procedures."

Morale plays an important part of the game. Each player must keep a roster sheet and track the deteriorating morale of every unit.

Units can form various Napoleonic-era formations: line, column, square and all-around. Leaders have an important effect on the game. A unit's zone of control only extends into the adjacent hex immediately in front of the unit, unless the player has chosen square or all-around formation.

There are also a number of optional rules, which add further complexity to the game, including shifting initiative, road columns, Napoleon's illness, skirmishers, cavalry reaction charges and recall, command control, and additional rules for morale and combat.

== Publication history ==
In 1979, Yaquinto simultaneously introduced their first eight games at Gencon XII. Two of those, both Napoleonic wargames designed by S. Craig Taylor, used the same game system: Thin Red Line and The Great Redoubt.

== Reception ==
In Issue 46 of the British wargaming magazine Perfidious Albion, Charles Vasey commented "The effect is rather like a [metal figurine wargame], as usual Yaquinto giving the same treatment as they did with Airforce. Vasey found the colour of the counters unsettling, remarking, "Dark colours do make reading the counters a pain, and the effect en masse is odd." Vasey did admit that the simplified rules, "Does allow you to play the games in reasonable time at brigade level."

In Issue 107 of Campaign, John Olsen commented on the twin games Thin Red Line and The Great Redoubt, saying, "Yaquinto has brought out a couple of games which use a first rate system to let you experience the scissors-cut-paper, rock-breaks-scissors, paper-covers-rock aspect of early 19th-century warfare."

In Issue 24 of Fire & Movement, Bill Haggart felt the game was unbalanced, saying, "the game favors the Russians. Not only do they have higher morale (as they should), but also equal or superior firepower. This makes it hard for the French." Haggart concluded, "Redoubt's system is difficult and challenging. To master it will require time."

In Issue 13 of The Wargamer, Jim Hind found this game less complex than some of its competitors, noting, "The game system itself has all the detail of Napoleonic tactics that was in La Bataille de la Moscowa, and withal manages this in a game of a much more reasonable size."

In Issue 53 of Moves, Ian Chadwick commented, "This is a good game, albeit a long and someone confusing one." Chadwick had a few complaints: "the rules format is difficult, the counters too thick and impossible to cut free without a sharp blade. The map is coloured poorly and could do with some upgraded art." Despite these challenges, Chadwick concluded, "For a first expedition in Napoleonics, Yaquinto has done quite well and seems to have learned a lot from what has gone before in the field."
