= The Thin Red Line (wargame) =

1979 Napoleonic board wargame

The Thin Red Line, subtitled "A Game of the Battle of Waterloo" is a board wargame published by Yaquinto Publications in 1979 that simulates the Battle of Waterloo.

== Description ==
The Thin Red Line is a two-player board wargame in which one player controls French forces under Napoleon and the other player controls Anglo-Allied forces under Arthur Wellesley, 1st Duke of Wellington. With 275 counters, a large hex grid map, and a 24-page rulebook, the game has been characterized as "of more than moderate complexity."

=== Gameplay ===
The game uses a complex sequence of play, which includes mutual fire or melee, routs following failed morale checks and possible advances after melee. Critic Ian Chadwick noted that "Numerous small rules cover a host of possible situations and modifications to the procedures."

Morale plays an important part of the game. Each player must keep a roster sheet and track the deteriorating morale of every unit.

Units can form various Napoleonic-era formations: line, column, square and all-around. Leaders have an important effect on the game. A unit's zone of control only extends into the adjacent hex immediately in front of the unit, unless the player has chosen square or all-around formation.

There are also a number of optional rules, which add further complexity to the game, including shifting initiative, road columns, Napoleon's illness, skirmishers, cavalry reaction charges and recall, command control, and additional rules for morale and combat.

=== Scenarios ===
The game comes with three main scenarios based on historical norms:

- The full historical battle
- A short game that ends when the Prussians arrive
- An early start game

In addition, there are two "what if?" scenarios:

- The Prussians fail to arrive
- Free set-up: The players are free to set up their forces as they wish at the start of the game.

== Publication history ==
In 1979, Yaquinto simultaneously introduced their first eight games at Gencon XII. Two of those, both Napoleonic wargames designed by S. Craig Taylor, used the same game system: The Great Redoubt and Thin Red Line.

== Reception ==
In Issue 107 of Campaign, John Olsen commented on the twin games Thin Red Line and The Great Redoubt, saying, "Yaquinto has brought out a couple of games which use a first rate system to let you experience the scissors-cut-paper, rock-breaks-scissors, paper-covers-rock aspect of early 19th-century warfare."

In Issue 53 of Moves, Ian Chadwick commented, "This is a good game, albeit a long and someone confusing one." Chadwick had a few complaints: "the rules format is difficult, the counters too thick and impossible to cut free without a sharp blade. The map is coloured poorly and could do with some upgraded art." Despite these challenges, Chadwick gave the game grades of "B" for Playability, "B" for Historical Accuracy, and "C" for Component Quality, concluding, "For a first expedition in Napoleonics, Yaquinto has done quite well and seems to have learned a lot from what has gone before in the field."
