= Demon's Run (board game) =

Board game

Demon's Run is a 1981 board game published by Yaquinto Publications.

== Gameplay ==
Demon's Run is an interstellar racing game taking place in an area of space where the hazards include black holes, radiation zones, and unusual "null" areas.

== Reception ==
Earl Perkins reviewed Demon's Run in The Space Gamer No. 54. Perkins commented that "However, Demon's Run is an excellent game. The idea is novel; the execution of the idea makes and enjoyable game, more so for three or more players than for one."
