= Attack of the Mutants! =

1981 board game

Attack of the Mutants! is a 1981 board game published by Yaquinto Publications.

== Gameplay ==
Attack of the Mutants! is a game in which the players try to use the equipment in the science building at Central State Tech to escape to an alternate Earth before the mutants can stop them.

== Reception ==
David Ladyman reviewed Attack of the Mutants! in The Space Gamer No. 41. Ladyman commented that "The graphics are distinct and colorful, although it can be annoying that the counters are too large for some of the rooms. The game is probably worth [the price], especially if creature-features are your kind of show."

Lewis Pulsipher reviewed Attack of the Mutants in The Space Gamer No. 43. Pulsipher commented that "Considering how little skill is involved, the presentation seems unnecessarily complicated. For completists only."

== Reviews ==
- Asimov's Science Fiction v7 n3 (1983 03)
- Jeux & Stratégie #14
