= Shooting Stars (board game) =

Board game

Shooting Stars is a 1980 board game published by Yaquinto Publications.

== Gameplay ==
Shooting Stars is a tactical game focusing on combat between space fighters.

== Reception ==
Eric Goldberg reviewed Shooting Stars in Ares Magazine #6 and commented that "Shooting Stars shows little or no work, and is an insult to the intelligence of any purchaser. Yaquinto and Steve Peek should be ashamed that their names are associated with it." Goldberg revisited the game in Ares Magazine #10 after corresponding with a reader and concluding that he had been "overly harsh in dismissing" the game and that "The premise, as dreadful as it may be, should not have wholly overshadowed a decent vector-based movement system – whatever the system's antecedents."

Gregory Courter reviewed Shooting Stars in The Space Gamer No. 37. Courter commented that "Shooting Stars is a good game. If the price was [lower] I would recommend it. As it stands, the buyer must decide if s/he wishes to pay for rules at the expense of component quality."

Nick Henfrey reviewed Shooting Stars for White Dwarf #24, giving it an overall rating of 8 out of 10, and stated that "If the idea of Shooting Stars appeals to you then the game will also. The system is simple, and it works. It fully lived up to the expectations formed on first seeing the box."

== Reviews ==
- Jeux & Stratégie #10
