= Pirates and Plunder =

1982 pirate role-playing game

Pirates and Plunder is a role-playing game published by Yaquinto Publications in 1982 that is set in the 17th century Spanish Main. It was designed to introduce the concept of role-playing to new players.

== Description ==
Pirates and Plunder is set in the age of piracy in the Caribbean; all players take on the role of pirates. The game is aimed at new role-players, both players and referees; the rulebooks are designed as a series of adventures.

In the first adventure, the players are pirates who have been captured by Spanish authorities. The rules then show the players and the referee how to generate pirate characters.

In the next adventure, the imprisoned pirates must fight other prisoners for food, leading to a demonstration of the basic combat rules. Subsequent chapters have the pirates escape their captors, find a ship, and so on, leading to rules about more advanced combat, experience points, etc.

The first book (44 pages) covers character creation and combat; the second (52 pages) covers advanced rules for use by the gamemaster in running the game; the third (40 pages) contains an introductory scenario, encounters, and a map. The game also includes a pad of character record sheets.

Despite being about pirates on the Spanish Main, the entire game takes place on land, not on ships.

== Publication history ==
Pirates and Plunder was designed by Michael S. Matheny, and was published by Yaquinto Publications as a boxed set including three books, a pad, reference sheets, and dice.

== Reception ==
In Issue 56 of The Space Gamer, W.G. Armintrout commented "I supposed [the theme of piracy] makes it a game players will enjoy, if they can convince some soul to GM it for them."

In White Dwarf #36, Murray Writtle was impressed, writing, "This is a good game, because it is full of atmosphere and the rules can be as simple or complex as you want." Writtle concluded by giving the game a top overall rating of 10 out of 10.

Anders Swenson reviewed Pirates and Plunder for Different Worlds magazine and stated that "I suppose I could recommend P&P for a certain limited set of players - adults males who are of a non-literary bent of mind, who enjoy some gaming, but who have no time for magic or outer space. Established gamers will do better to save their money for books about the Spanish Main, for they will not get the expected background or color or glimpse of real pirates that one might expect from a game like this, and most gamemasters who desire a pirate game will do far better to adapt their regular game system to cover the period."

In his 1990 book The Complete Guide to Role-Playing Games, game critic Rick Swan liked the graduated adventures that gradually introduced rules for new players. But he found the character generation system "uninspired" and the combat rules "straightforward but nothing special." Swan also had concerns for new referees, pointing out that "many rules are inadequately explained, and the entire game suffers from sloppy editing." Swan was also incredulous that none of the game was set at sea, calling it "a stunning oversight for a game presumably about piracy." Swan concluded by giving this game a poor rating of only 1.5 out of 4, saying, "Pirates and Plunder is more memorable for its presentation than for its value as a game."

In his 1991 book Heroic Worlds, Lawrence Schick was unimpressed, describing the Pirates and Plunder game system as "second-rate."

John O'Neill of Black Gate believed the game failed because there "was no hint of anything like the supernatural in the rules" which "just wasn't enough for players raised on Dungeons and Dragons. While the designers may have seen it as a noble effort to capture the pure swashbuckling fun of classic pirate novels and movies like Captain Blood, what we saw instead was a lack of imagination."
