= Pickett's Charge (board game) =

1980 board game

Pickett's Charge, subtitled "A Game of the Battle of Gettysburg, July 1–3, 1863", is a board wargame published by Yaquinto Publications in 1980 that is a tactical simulation of the three-day Battle of Gettysburg.

== Description ==
Although the title suggests this two-player wargame is only focused on the famous and ultimately futile "Pickett's Charge" on the afternoon of 3 July 1863, the game covers all three days of the overall battle. The rules system is the same as used in Yaquinto's earlier games Thin Red Line and The Great Redoubt. There are separate scenarios for each of the three days of the battle, as well as for the assaults on Culp's Hill and Little Round Top.

=== Components ===
The game box includes:

- 22" x 28" paper hex grid map of Gettysburg battlefield scaled at 500 yd (457 m) per hex
- 350 counters
- 34-page rulebook
- pad of Strength/Morale record sheets
- two player aid charts

=== Gameplay ===
Each day turn represents one hour, each night turn represents two hours. Each turn starts with five phases by Player 1:

1. Charge
2. Movement and Reinforcements
3. Rally
4. Fire Combat
5. Melee Combat

Player 2 then repeats all these phases to complete the turn.

Each unit has front, back and flank facings, and only exerts a zone of control into the hex in front of the unit. Several optional rules can be used, including moving artillery by prolongue (dragging them into place rather than limbering them up); wagon and ammunition supplies; and command control.

=== Victory conditions ===
Victory points are gained for taking Cemetery Ridge, Culp's Hill and Little Round Top, as well as for eliminating enemy units, and for each friendly unit that survives the entire battle at full strength. The player with the most Victory Points is the winner.

== Publication history ==
Pickett's Charge was designed by S. Craig Taylor, with artwork by Paul Philippoteaux, and was published by Yaquinto in 1980.

== Reception ==
In Issue 33 of Phoenix, Doug Mylie noted that "players will find that they are always short of movement points", since "it takes time to get troops into action." He also warned that "It is always tempting to throw everything against the enemy, and indeed there are times when this must be done.. But knowing when to do it is important!" Mylie concluded, "I bought Pickett's Charge on the strength of previous Yaquinto games and can definitely recommend it."

In Issue 54 of Moves, Steve List found the basic game "a bit simplistic", and recommended players use all of the optional rules. He concluded by giving Pickett's Charge a grade of "B", saying, "This game takes a new approach to the portrayal of Civil War combat, and in some cases is not as successful as it could be."

In 1993, Edward Linenthal noted that copies of Pickett's Charge were for sale in a Gettysburg hobby and souvenir shop more than a decade after its publication.
