= The Fall of South Vietnam (game) =

1981 Vietnam War board wargame

The Fall of South Vietnam, subtitled "A Game of Combat in South Vietnam – 1973-1975", is a board wargame published by Yaquinto Publications in 1981 that simulates the final months of the Vietnam War. Reviewers found it too simplistic to cover the complex military situation in South Vietnam.

== Background ==
With the withdrawal of American forces from South Vietnam in 1973, North and South Vietnamese forces sparred for control of territory. In December 1974, North Vietnam began a major offensive, which would end with the fall of Saigon at the end of April 1975.

== Description ==
The Fall of South Vietnam is a two-player board wargame in which one player controls North Vietnam forces that are invading the South, and the other player controls the South Vietnam forces. The game focuses on control of the provinces. South Vietnamese forces are plagued by the possibility of desertion as the North starts to take over provinces.

=== Gameplay ===
The game uses an alternating "I Go, You Go" series of turns, where the North Vietnamese player moves and attacks, followed by the South Vietnamese player. The game lasts for eight turns.

== Publication history ==
Neil Zimmerer created several introductory "beer & pretzels" board games for Yaquinto, including The Fall of South Vietnam in 1981. The game was published in a double LP-sized folder with the game map printed on the inside of the folder.

== Reception ==
In Issue 20 of The Wargamer, Walter Oppenheim was not impressed with the game, commenting, "As a re-creation of history, the game is nonsense." Oppenheim did admit "Of course, it's only meant as a short and simple game, so we mustn’t expect too much", but concluded, "This game will tell you about as much about the war in Vietnam as Monopoly shows how Real Estate Agents work."

In Issue 59 of Moves, American historian John Prados noted "The most appealing feature of Fall of South Vietnam must be the quick pace of the game. The whole can be finished in about two hours, maybe three for two inexperienced garners. Action is direct and results immediate." Prados concluded, "Players desiring a fullscale operational game on the Vietnamese war will not find it here [...] Fall of South Vietnam is definitely for the player who wants a quick light game."
