= Ultimatum: A Game of Nuclear Confrontation =

1979 Cold War board wargame

Ultimatum
- Designers: Michael Hemphill
- Illustrators: Stephen Peek
- Publishers: Yaquinto Publications
- Publication: 1979
- Genres: Cold War

Ultimatum: A Game of Nuclear Confrontation is a board wargame published by Yaquinto Publications in 1979 that simulates a nuclear confrontation between the United States and the Soviet Union.

== Description ==
Ultimatum: A Game of Nuclear Confrontation is a game for 2 players, one of whom controls the nuclear arsenal of the Soviet Union, while the other controls the arsenal of the United States. The game map covers America and the Soviet Union along the Great Circle route, highlighting population density and strategic military assets. Russia's core population clusters around Ukraine, Moscow, and the Urals, whereas the U.S. has a concentrated population area from Boston to Texas and up to Los Angeles.

=== Gameplay ===
Players deploy bombers, missiles, submarines, and ABMs, engaging in nuclear exchanges through two attack methods: Simultaneous Launch (all-out strikes) or Phased Launch (allowing bombers to evade initial impacts). The game includes MIRVs, cruise missiles, and directed energy beam ABMs. Combat outcomes depend on missile accuracy, target defense ratings, and interception attempts. The game features Crisis Areas — global regions where superpowers can escalate tensions for control and victory points. Various scenarios simulate real-world conflicts, including the Cuban Missile Crisis, the Vietnam War, and a hypothetical war in 2000.

The Tournament Game adds economic strategy, allowing players to enhance military capabilities or influence crises.

=== Victory conditions ===
The player who survives a nuclear exchange with more assets intact than their opponent is the winner. If the game results in total destruction, there is no winner.

== Publication history ==
In 1979, Yaquinto simultaneously introduced their first eight games at Gencon XII. One of those was Ultimatum, designed by Michael Hemphill, and published as a boxed set with artwork by Stephen Peek.

== Reception ==
Charles H. Vasey reviewed Ultimatum: A Game of Nuclear Confrontation in Perfidious Albion #43 (December 1979) and stated that "What I would say is that this game is inaccurate in putting the players in the place of real presidents and generals. Without the rule as to outrage, or the effect on one's own people the player will take the wrong decisions for the right reasons (in game terms). The game is certainly very instructive as to the nature of the nuclear race. It is possible that the use of DEB (such as laser) could turn the ball-game around. Its possible, but until then the game is a bit of a no-no. It also suffers from some strangely glitched designer's rules, and list I hope they were a glitch."

Games included Ultimatum in its top 100 games of 1980, saying, "It is appropriate that a game of nuclear war should have only one turn. Players target and launch missiles, and then see who survives. The advanced game has players buying weapons systems, spending defense allocations and plotting when to start a war. Better than the real thing."

In the January 1981 issue of the Italian games magazine Pergioco, Giovanni Ingellis called Ultimatum "the most hallucinatory of nightmares: thermonuclear war between the U.S.A. and the U.S.S.R." Two issues later, Sergio Masini called Ultimatum an interesting example of "the 'non-war' simulation game, or at least those that don't make war the main aspect of the game. 'Political' games like this should take pride of place."
