= Starfall (board game) =

1979 board game

Starfall is a 1979 board game published by Yaquinto Publications.

== Gameplay ==
Starfall is a game where 2-4 empires in the 24th-century must find, conquer, and colonize other systems and as they also fight against each other.

== Reception ==
John Filiatreau from The Courier-Journal of Louisville, Kentucky said that "The game does require a lot of imagination, a measure of patience, and a couple of free hours. It is not for casual play."

Jeff Jacobson reviewed Starfall in The Space Gamer No. 29. Jacobson commented that "Starfall is worth its price in cash and learning time. But there are other games more worthwhile."

Steve List reviewed Starfall in Ares Magazine #8 and commented that "Starfall is reminiscent of earlier games like Stellar Conquest in that the players in general are competing over the colonization of a stellar cluster and in doing so may choose to pursue or avoid armed conflict."

In Issue 25 of Phoenix, Doug Davies noted that this is primarily an economic game as opposed to a wargame. He concluded, "If this is your type of game, you are fairly experienced at boardgaming and have a liking for science fiction, I don't think you'll be disappointed with Starfall."
