= Marine: 2002 =

American board game with a military sci-fi theme

Marine: 2002 is a 1979 board game published by Yaquinto Publications.

== Gameplay ==
Marine: 2002 is a game of warfare on the Moon taking place during the conflict known as the First Russo-American Lunar War in the then-future of 1998-2002.

== Reception ==
Paul Manz reviewed Marine: 2002 in The Space Gamer No. 34. Manz commented that "Marine: 2002 is one of Yaquinto's best works. The physical qualify of the game is excellent, and the mechanics are very playable. It is a 'complete' game, but most of all it's FUN!"
