= Mythology (board game) =

Board game

Yaquinto edition, cover art by Rodger MacGowan

Mythology, subtitled "A Game of Adventure in the Age of Heroes", is a fantasy board game published by Yaquinto Publications in 1980.

== Description ==
Mythology is a game in which each player takes the role of a deity from Greek mythology and attempts to control the lives of heroes and monsters.

=== Components ===
The game box contains:

- a circular board
- counters
- information cards
- event cards
- rulebook
- pad of log sheets
- counter tray

=== Setup ===
Heroes are set up at random locations on the map, while treasures are placed at the edge of the map. Each player secretly draws a Fate counter, which gives them a secret Victory condition.

=== Power point allocation ===
Each player takes the role of a Greek god who is attempting to control Greek heroes and monsters, either using the heroes to kill monsters or other heroes, or getting the heroes to move to the edge of the board to obtain a treasure. Each player has ten power points per turn which can be secretly allocated to attempting to move up to five heroes or monsters.

=== Movement ===
Once all power points have been allocated, the first player announces a hero or monster that the player wishes to move, but the player is not required to reveal how many power points are actually being used. (The player could have allocated no power points to he hero or monster, and then can attempt to bluff the other players.) If the active player succeeds in moving a hero or monster without a challenge, the player receives a glory point.

=== Challenge ===
Any player can challenge the active player's attempt to move a hero or monster, either believing that the active player is bluffing and has not allocated any power points, or the active player has allocated less power points than the challenger.

This challenge is resolved by a bidding process, in which the two players use power points up to the number they allocated to the hero or monster in question. (Both players must be truthful about the number of power points they allocated.)The winner of the bidding war steals a glory point from the other player.

=== Combat ===
Players can use heroes to kill monsters (a reward of three glory points), or other heroes. If the hero killed is controlled by another player who allocated power points to the dead hero, then the victorious player receives glory points. However, if the dead hero was not controlled by any other player, then the victorious player loses glory points.

=== Treasure ===
If a player can get a hero to collect a treasure and bring it home, the player is awarded 50 glory points. This is a rare event — reviewer John Lambshead noted that he had never seen a treasure successfully retrieved.

== Publication history ==
Mythology was designed by J. Stephen Peek, and was published by Yaquinto Publications in 1980 with cover art by Rodger B. MacGowan. After the demise of Yaquinto, Precis Intermedia acquired the rights to the game, and published a PDF version in 2019.

== Reception ==
In Issue 31 of The Space Gamer, John Strohm was disappointed with this game, commenting "This game had promise, but it failed to deliver. I do not recommend it."

Eric Goldberg reviewed Mythology in Ares Magazine #4 and commented that "Steve Peek has proven once again that he is capable of original and appropriate design. He also has shown either an inability or a disinclination to properly develop this game."

In Issue 49 of the British wargaming magazine Perfidious Albion, Geoffrey Barnard commented, "it has had a less than enthusiastic welcome from the reviewers, but is one of the few non-historical games which I would recommend everyone who plays multi-player games should purchase. This is excellent stuff folks, it simulates by subtlety and is, first and foremost, a real game." Barnard concluded, "I am much impressed with this game, and of its mechanics which certainly must have applications elsewhere. Whether the idea can be moved to other pantheons is less easy to say."

Charles Vasey in White Dwarf #22 (December 1980 – January 1981) gave the game a 9 and said "The whole package makes a most exciting game".

In Issue 32 of Phoenix (July–August 1981), John Lambshead was impressed by the production values "as the artwork and physical standards of the components are excellent." However, Lambshead found the game bogged down with more than two players. "As soon as a player tries to do something constructive with a hero it merely becomes a competition to see what kills him first — a natural (unnatural?) disaster or one of half a dozen wandering monsters which immediately jump on him." Lambshead concluded that it was "a game that must be played between small numbers of imaginative people. It is a superb game but a few dumbos can rapidly reduce the whole thing to a bore."
