= Close Assault: A Man-to-Man Game of Squad Tactics and Command =

Game published in 1983

Close Assault: A Man-to-Man Game of Squad Tactics and Command - Europe 1939–1945 is a board wargame published by Yaquinto Publications in 1983 that simulates squad-level combat during World War II.

== Description ==
Close Assault is a two-player board wargame, in which each player controls a small squad of soldiers with various weapons and sometimes vehicles, depending on the scenario chosen.

The game uses a hex grid map that can be adapted to show various terrains, roads, trails and buildings.

Although the Basic game is relatively simple, the Advanced game and many optional rules add layers of complexity to the game.

=== Impulses ===
Unlike most board wargames that use a fixed alternating series of turns, in Close Assault each player puts a given number of their side's impulse counters into a cup. Differences in troop quality are represented by the number of impulse counters that can be put in the cup — the side with better quality troops will have more counters than the side with poorer quality troops. To start the turn, a random counter is drawn from the cup, and the owning player gets to carry out a certain number actions (movement, attack, etc.) When those actions are finished, another counter is drawn from the cup. This continues until all counters have been drawn from the cup, completing the turn.

== Publication history ==
S. Craig Taylor designed Close Assault and it was published by Yaquinto in 1983 in Yaquinto's distinctive doulble LP-sized packaging. This was one of the last games published by Yaquinto before it went out of business.

== Reception ==
In Issue 38 of Fire & Movement, Ron Jongeling commented, "Though it has some flaws and a few rules that I personally do not agree with, it is easily the best tactical simulation game available to date."

In Issue 20 of The Grenadier, John T. Lamont was enthusiastic about the game, saying, "This is a game which could become a lifestyle." Lamont found a lot to like, commenting, "From the gratifying amount of sheer contents, through the fast and easy basic game, to the opulence of detail simulated by the advanced and optional rules, Close Assault is a lot of good game." He concluded, "Minutely-detailed and well-produced, it should be considered seriously by any wargamer interested in squad level activity."

In Issue 65 of Fire & Movement, Jeff Petraska liked the unusual impulse system, saying, "The impulses of both sides occur in random order during a turn, making play unpredictable and fun. The game's only drawback is its dense rulebook."

In a retrospective review in Issue 6 of Simulacrum, Joe Scoleri wrote, "Had I known about this game in 1983, I would have played it to death. The innovative impulse system is the shining centerpiece of the game. Through this system the designer was able to introduce the chaos and uncertainty of small unit actions while simultaneously reflecting differences in troop quality." Scoleri concluded, "Though some may dispute the level of realism offered by the system, I find that Close Assault represents the best compromise between realism and playability in modern close-tactical gaming."
