= Asteroid Pirates =

Board game

Asteroid Pirates is a 1980 board game published by Yaquinto Publications.

== Gameplay ==
Asteroid Pirates is a game in which tactical ship-to-ship space combat between players takes place inside the asteroid belt.

== Reception ==
Earl Perkins reviewed Asteroid Pirates in The Space Gamer No. 53. Perkins commented that "In conclusion, Asteroid Pirates is a fine game for those who: a) like good, simple (and repairable) combat mechanics; b) like to correct and expand vague rules; and c) have always wondered what chess with death was like."
