= Commando Actions =

1981 board wargame

- Designers: Michael Matheny
- Publishers: Yaquinto Publications
- Publication: 1981
- Genres: WWII

Commando Actions is a board wargame published by Yaquinto Publications in 1981 that simulates tactical small-scale actions by British commandos during World War II.

== Description ==
Commando Actions is a tactical board wargame for two players in which one player controls British commando units and the other player controls opponents. The game comes with counters that represent platoons, individual leaders, and vehicles such as tanks. The 12" x 24" hex grid map (printed on the inside of the game's LP-style folder and scaled at 25 metres (27 yd) per hex), shows terrain features such as trees, buildings and streams. Counters can be used to add additional features such as dock facilities, petroleum storage tanks and other buildings.

=== Gameplay ===
The game system uses a traditional "I Go, You Go" system of alternating turns that uses the following structure:

1. Indirect Fire
2. Direct Fire
3. Movement

Rules come in three levels:

- Basic
- Advanced (Night and sunrise turns, dummy units, alarms and sentries; and extra details for combat, stacking and movement.)
- Optional Advanced (Aircraft units, naval support, blind fire, evade movement and run movement, voluntary suppression/pin, parachute drops, antiaircraft units, close assault, overruns, officer modifications, surrender, smoke and Flail tanks.

=== Scenarios ===
The game comes with eight scenarios, three of them historical and five of them hypothetical:

==== Historical ====
- "Raid on Bruneval (France 27 Feb 1942)", advanced game optional rules
- "Action on Hill 170 (Kangaw, Arakan, Malaya, 31 January 1945)", advanced game optional rules
- "Assault on Battery (Walcheren Island, Scheidt Estuary, Holland, 1 November 1944)", advanced game optional rules

==== Hypothetical ====
- "Surprise Attack", basic game rules
- "The Iron Bridge", basic game rules
- "Night Raid", basic game optional rules
- "Night Raid", basic game optional rules
- "Ambush", advanced game optional rules

== Publication history ==
In 1977, Avalon Hill published the tactical wargame Squad Leader, which quickly became a bestseller with well in excess of 100,000 sales, making it one of the most successful war games ever made. Other companies quickly produced squad-scaled wargames, including Commando Operations, a game designed by Michael Mattheny that used a basic set of rules very similar to Squad Leader. (Critic John Vanore called it "a simplified rehash of Squad Leader.") Yaquinto published Commando Actions in 1981 in an LP-style folder.

== Reception ==
In Issue 52 of the British wargaming magazine Perfidious Albion, Geoffrey Barnard commented, "The main problem is one of presentation." Barnard didn't like that the map printed on the game folder had to be used for all scenarios despite differences in terrain. Barnard also found the counters looked " distinctly cheap." Barnard also had trouble with the organization of the rules, admitting, "I found the rules rather difficult to come to grips with; they seemed to be laid out in a manner that made it difficult to find the rules I felt I needed." Barnard concluded, " I found this game a considerable disappointment. Maybe I am being unfair to keep comparing it to Squad Leader, however the two games are closely related ... Commando Actions seems to add one or two new ideas, and does a lot of things differently (just for the sake of doing it differently??). It does however lose most of the colour of SL, and I found it nowhere near as interesting to play."

In Issue 60 of Moves, Nick Schuessler commented, "Commando Action is a fine system competently executed ... Yaquinto should be applauded for the innovative Album Game format, which gives us quite a value for eight bucks."

In Issue 36 of Fire & Movement, Michael Matheny also found issues with the rules, commenting, "The rulebooks disclose a disturbing tendency on Yaquinto's part towards an SPI-ish convoluted writing style, and reading them is by no means a casual matter to be undertaken with a six-pack in tow." Matheny concluded, "Commando Actions is a good game, but it does not fill any gaps in conflict simulation; on the contrary, it does nothing more than jump on the [Squad Leader] bandwagon ... The way the competition stacks up, I am afraid this one would probably wind up collecting dust on a shelf."
