= Panzer (wargame) =

1979 WWII board wargame

Cover art by Rodger B. MacGowan, 1979

Panzer is a board wargame published by Yaquinto Publications in 1979 that simulates Eastern Front combat between Axis forces and the Soviet Union during World War II. A version was released by Excalibre Games in 1993.

== Description ==
Panzer is a two-player board wargame in which one player controls Axis forces and the other player controls Soviet forces.

=== Components ===
The game comes with an illustrated 32-page rulebook and 49 data cards describing all relevant combat information about every tank, vehicle, artillery unit and infantry unit in the game. The game is played on a multi-piece geomorphic hex grid map scaled at 50 metres (55 yd) per hex. Counters representing landscape can be used to customize the map board.

=== Gameplay ===
The game uses a simultaneous movement system, requiring both players to plot movement and as well as direct fire that each tank, artillery gun or squad will make during the turn. Because of the simultaneous movement, critic Loren Bird noted the severe limits placed on the number of units used in any scenario, saying, "Unfortunately, a simove [simultaneous movement] approach limits the size of the games, so the use of battalions (as in Squad Leader) is beyond the game's scope, and rules out many of the larger miniatures battles."

During the movement plotting phase of each turn, players can also designate units to focus on opportunity fire "trip wires" — if an enemy unit crosses the trip wire, units focused on it may fire on the intruder.

After players have finished, the remainder of the turn is made up of two phases:

- Direct fire: Both players conduct direct fire simultaneously.
- Movement: All units programmed to move do so. (Opportunity fire happens in this phase should an enemy unit cross a designated "trip wire".)

In order to calculate whether a tank hits another tank, the attacking player must gather data from the data cards of both tanks, and calculate distance and angle. (Rangefinder measuring sticks and angle gauges are included.) Terrain and movement also factor into the calculation. (Critic Eric Goldberg wrote, "Everything but the horoscope of the tank commander is factored into fire.") The calculations provide the attacking tank with an armor penetration strength, which is compared to the defending tank's protection rating. If the attacker's penetration strength is higher than protection rating, the shell hits, and the attacking player rolls a die to see where the target has been struck and what the result is.

=== Scenarios ===
The game comes with three scenarios, but the rules include instructions for designing further scenarios.

== Publication history ==
In 1979, Yaquinto simultaneously introduced their first eight games at Gencon XII. One of those games was Panzer, designed by James M. Day, and featuring cover art by Rodger B. MacGowan.

The following year, Yaquinto released two more tank-focussed wargames that used the same game system, 88 (set in North Africa), and Tank (set in Western Europe).

After the demise of Yaquinto, Excalibre Games acquired a single-use license to produce a version of the game. This second edition was published in 1992.

== Reception ==
In Issue 98 of Campaign, Loren Bird commented, "To those who enjoy tactical games, particularly the Eastern Front variety, Panzer offers a unique view of armored combat that is quite different from other games." Bird was not enamored of the simultaneous movement, but admitted, "From a realism viewpoint, I'd guess that simove [simultaneous movement] has its benefits, and will appeal to those who enjoy the more involved nature of the system." Bird warned that "The scenarios are very 'loose' and require a lot of design-your-own work to be meaningful." Bird also pointed out that "Players not especially familiar with detailed armor miniatures may find the rules confusing, although the actual mechanics are simple once mastered." Bird concluded, "Panzer is an excellent game of Eastern Front combat that potential buyers should consider very strongly if the aspect of a simove, small-unit-action, detailed armor game sounds appealing."

In Issue 44 of the British wargaming magazine Perfidious Albion, Geoffrey Barnard commented, "While Panzer does most certainly work, it rather seems to me that it does not comprise a step forward in game design." Barnard didn't like the terrain counters, feeling that terrain printed on a map would have been better. Barnard did admit that "the quantity of information contained on the unit cards is excellent, and the range over both period and weight, armoured cars though to heavy, taking in SP guns on the way, makes for great interest." Barnard concluded, "Panzer is a game of considerable detail and playability, and as things happen fairly quickly once you get the hang of the system it is reasonably enjoyable."

In Issue 48 of Moves, Eric Goldberg noted the generous amount of material included in the game box, saying, "The Panzer package contains enough paper to constitute a fire hazard." However, Goldberg noted, "This mass of information is part of the game's strength and weakness. On the plus side, Panzer is an in-depth simulation. However the flow of play is impeded by the amount of routine data processing encumbering the players at anything over the simplest level of the game." Goldberg also commented on the slowness of play, saying, "The use of simultaneous movement is the culprit primarily responsible for the lengthy playing time." Golderg also felt the game was "a curious blend of outmoded mechanics, state of the art technology and fresh new ideas." Goldberg concluded, "This is another game that suffers from spotty development. The rules writing is very weak in places, and the organization is the wargame equivalent of neanderthalic [...] The amount of care lavished upon the game does impress, but the plethora of inconsistencies offsets many of the good aspects."

In Issue 50 of Moves, Steve List thought the components were "impressive", but noted the slowness of play and lack of detailed scenarios, saying, "I suspect it will be studied and admired/criticized more than it will be played."
