= MBT (board game) =

Board wargame published in 1989

Box cover of the 1989 edition.

MBT (a military acronym for "Main Battle Tank") is a board wargame published by Avalon Hill in 1989 that simulates hypothetical World War Three tank combat between NATO and Warsaw Pact forces in Western Europe. A second edition was published by GMT Games in 2016.

== Description ==
MBT is a two-player wargame of conventional ground-oriented combat set in 1987, during the final days of the Cold War. One player controls NATO mechanized forces defending West Germany, and the other player controls the invading Warsaw Pact forces. The game, which has two rulebooks, a large hex grid map, and over 400 counters representing individual tanks, trucks, airplanes, helicopters and squads of infantry, is moderately complex. The map is scaled to 100 m (110 yd) per hex, and depending on the scenario, each turn represents 1–5 minutes of game time.

=== Gameplay ===
The first edition of the game uses an alternating "I Go, You Go" format. The Warsaw Pact player has the following phases:

1. Spotting
2. Command (move their units, fire at target, short halt and fire, overwatch, or give no command at all)

Once the first player has finished, the NATO player is given the same opportunities for play, completing one full turn.

The second edition uses a more complex sequence of play. The "I Go, You Go" format is replaced by an initiative phase where both players roll two ten-sided dice, apply some modifiers, and the player with the greater number gets to fire first.

The advanced version of both editions the game increases the complexity by allowing for various types of ammunition, minefields, aircraft, helicopters, engineer units, and more.

== Publication history ==
MBT was designed by James M. Day and was published by Avalon Hill in 1989 as a boxed set with artwork by Rich Hasenauer and Charles Kibler.

In 2016, GMT Games published a second edition with revised rules.

== Reception ==
Norman Smith reviewed Avalon Hill's original edition of MBT for Games International magazine, and gave it 4 stars out of 5, stating that "MBT should be well received by those whose prime interest is with modern tactical games. Miniature players should also take a look at this game."

In Issue 3 of Jeux & Stratégie, Pierre Grumberg also reviewed the original edition and warned of the game's complexity, saying, "The level of detail is pushed to the extreme, a little too much for beginners." But he noted "the complexity doesn't put you off, and if you have time to learn the game, you will certainly like it."

Writing for Armchair General, Rick Martin reviewed the GMT version of the game, and saw a lot to like, including the "Tons of content" and 'Beautiful components." His only issue was some rule confusion around air power attacking armor using armor piercing ammunition. He concluded by giving this game an excellent rating of 99%, saying, "As always, [designer] James Day has performed an incredible amount of research to make sure that all aspects of the weapons and situations are covered with exquisite detail [...] MBT is worth every penny for armor fans. Get this game! It is an instant classic!"

The Center for Army Lessons Learned (part of the United States Army Combined Arms Center) listed the 2016 edition of MBT as a commercial game that can be played for wargaming training purposes, saying, "This game trains decision making in ambiguous situations. It requires being able to envision yourself, the enemy, and terrain in relation to time and mission. It also teaches equipment capabilities, vulnerabilities, and tactical best practices." The authors of the study suggested "Double blind games, using multiple copies, take time and planning, but can greatly enhance realistic decision making."

== Other reviews and commentary ==
- Fire & Movement #102
- Casus Belli #54
