= Hero (board game) =

1980 boardgame

Cover of LP-style game folder, with cover art by John Hagen, 1980

Hero is a medieval fantasy board game published by Yaquinto Publications in 1980. Each player creates a hero and attempts to make it to the end of the labyrinth while fighting off monsters, while simultaneously controlling the monsters that plague the other players.

== Description ==
Hero is a dungeon crawl adventure game for 2-3 players that takes place in a labyrinthine catacomb.

== Gameplay ==
Each player is given a pool of points with which to buy attributes for their Hero: Courage, Comeliness, Class, Intelligence, and Luck. The player can also choose to purchase armor, which will aid the Hero, but will count against their score at the end of the game. Each player is then given a separate dungeon full of monsters to explore. All the dungeons lead to the center of the board, where Princess Alysa awaits.

Each player also controls monsters in the other players' separate dungeons to slow down or even eliminate the other heroes.

=== Victory conditions ===
The first Hero to reach the dungeon exit wins the favor of Princess Alysa and wins the game. If more than one hero reaches her during the same turn, the princess chooses the game winner based on the sum of each hero's ability scores (subtracting points if the hero wore armor), as well as points for treasure found and number of monsters killed.

== Publication history ==
In 1980, new game company Yaquinto released four games packaged in LP-style folders, with the maps printed on the inside cover of the folder, the first one being Hero, a game designed by Michael Matheny, with cover art by John Hagen.

== Reception ==
In the August 1980 edition of The Space Gamer (Issue No. 30), Paul Manz found it a simple and enjoyable game, saying, "Hero has very high-quality components. It's a relaxing change from the other, involved, complicated fantasy adventure games, and for [the price] it's a great buy!"

In the November 1980 edition of Dragon (Issue 43), Roberto Camino found the production values to be professional and the cover art "eye-catching". Despite the relatively high cost and lack of replayability over time, Camino recommended it for players new to the fantasy genre, saying, "Hero is an enjoyable game, due greatly to the device of the player who controls a hero as well as the monsters which are arrayed against an opposing hero. However, after a few playings, it becomes repetitive and a bit worn. What Hero is tailor made for is as an introductory game, utilizing the strong allure of superior graphics to entice a newcomer, showing him a good game and leaving him wanting more."

In Issue 101 of Campaign, Bob Schroeder commented, "All in all, the game lacks real excitement but can be enjoyed purely as a 'beer and pretzels' game."

In a retrospective review in Issue 12 of Simulacrum, Joe Scoleri commented, "Hack and slash dungeon with a twist: in addition to playing their own Hero, each player controls the monsters in an opponent's dungeon." Scoleri concluded, "It's beer and pretzels all the way, but a fun introductory game."
