= The Sword and The Flame =

Tabletop game

The Sword and the Flame
- Sky Galleons box cover The Sword and the Flame (1979) by Yaquinto
- Designers: Larry V. Brom
- Publishers: And That's The Way It Was..., Yaquinto Publications
- Publication: 1988, 1979
- Genres: British colonial wars
- Players: 2+
- Setup time: 30+ minutes
- Playing time: 60–120 minutes
- Chance: Medium
- Age range: 12 and up
- Skills: Strategic thought

The Sword and The Flame is a wargame based on British colonial wars (in particular, the Anglo-Zulu War) and, more generally, a set of rules applied to a variety of wargames.

These rules for playing colonial wargames were first drafted by Larry Brom in 1978. The rules have gone through several revisions, but still have the same basic characteristics that they had when first written.

== Design concepts ==
When Larry drafted the original set of The Sword and The Flame rules (usually referred to as TSATF) he had 5 main objectives. These were:

- Enjoyment: in that the game itself was oriented more to being fun than as an accurate historical simulation
- Playability: a reference to the fact that some rulesets are noted for the complexity of their phrasing and the minutiae of their amendments; Larry favoured simple rules
- Drama: Larry wanted to ensure that every game had a chance of being won by either side, and that a player could not exactly predict an opposing player's movement distance.
- Excitement: linked to the idea of drama, but Larry also wanted to ensure that both sides were involved in all stages of the action. Larry's system of resolving combat by matching off opposing models rather than calculating a mêlée en masse was intended to achieve this.
- Historical Flavour: the game should appear to be what happened in the time being simulated although it would not seek to be an exact recreation—in TSATF both sides have an equal chance of winning, whereas in history the colonial power was usually dominant over the indigenous population.

== Randomness ==
The rules included some interesting innovations, particularly the use of playing cards to randomise movement and firing (Larry refers to this as the 'random move card innovation'). At a time when movement and firing was either alternate ('you move, I move') or simultaneous, this represented a major change in thinking amongst wargamers.

== Derivatives ==
In 1979, Yaquinto Publications released Supplement 1, which went along with their edition of the game. This first variant included answers to frequently asked questions, optional rules and three alternate gaming periods, including: The Boxer Rebellion, French and Indian War, and French Foreign Legion periods.

The rules have proven so popular that they have generated a whole set of variants which adapt the rules from their original British colonial (and especially Anglo-Zulu War) focus to other historical periods; the names of the variants usually incorporate the words "the Sword", although the variant that simulates the establishment of the White Rajahs in Sarawak is called The Kris And The Flame. A fantasy wargame variant Awaken The Storm! was released in 2007.

== Title ==
The title is derived from The Widow at Windsor, a poem by Rudyard Kipling, part of his Barrack-Room Ballads. This poem talks about Queen Victoria and how the empire she rules is so powerful because of the sacrifice that her soldiers make; the relevant part reads:

Walk wide o' the Widow at Windsor,
For 'alf o' Creation she owns:
We 'ave bought 'er the same with the sword an' the flame,
An' we've salted it down with our bones.

== Reception ==
Steve Winter comments: "The Sword and the Flame is the closest thing that any historical period has to a universal set of rules. Even the rare colonial wargamer who doesn't use The Sword and the Flame for his own games has certainly played with them at some point. At wargame conventions, the vast majority of colonial-themed games use TS&TF, not only because it's fast moving and fun but because everyone knows the rules."

Sword and the Flame was awarded the Origins Award for "Best Miniatures Rules of 1984".

== Reviews ==
- Jeux & Stratégie #27
