= The Barbarians (board game) =

1981 board game

Cover of album edition, artwork by Chris White, 1981

The Barbarians, subtitled "Games of the Fall of Rome and the Mongol Invasion of Europe", is a set of two board wargames published by Yaquinto Publications in 1981.

== Description ==
The Barbarians contains two games:

- Sack Rome covers the period 330–476 A.D., when Rome was sacked several times by various "barbarian" invaders.
- Mongol simulates the Mongol invasion of Europe that lasted from 1237 to 1242 A.D.

=== Components ===
The game box contains

- two maps
- 200 counters (80 for "Sack of Rome", 120 for "Mongol")
- Ziplock bags for counter storage
- 8-page rulebook for both games

=== Gameplay ===
==== Sack of Rome ====
The players play twice for a complete game. The map shows the Western Roman Empire, with Rome located in the south-western corner. The game takes 14 turns, each turn representing ten years, starting in 330 A.D. At various points in the game, various bands of barbarians (Goths, Vandals, Visigoths and Huns) enter from the north, and try to fight their way to Rome. Each turn, the Barbarians move and fight first, followed by Roman movement and combat. The game ends when a Barbarian unit reaches and holds Rome. The players then reverse roles and play again. The winner of the overall game is the player who defended Rome longer.

An optional rule allows for two Barbarian players, and offers the option of diplomacy, where the Roman player can ally with one or the other of the Barbarian players.

==== Mongol ====
The Mongols invade Europe from the east. The game lasts nine turns, each representing six months, and the Mongol player must control 23 provinces by the end of the final turn to win. To replicate the unwillingness of European nations to unite in the face of the Mongol invasion, some armies can only fight on their own territory, while others need a die roll of 5 or 6 to mobilize.

== Publication history ==
The Barbarians was designed by S. Craig Taylor and Neil Zimmerer, with artwork by Chris White, and was published by Yaquinto Publications in 1981 in an LP record-sized folder with the maps printed on the inside cover. However, counter storage was an issue in the album, so Yaquinto re-released the game with the original album folder, but now enclosed in a box, with Ziplock bags provided for counter storage.

== Reception ==
Reviewers generally thought these games were good for a short session.

In the June 1981 issue of The Space Gamer (Issue 40), Gregory Courter commented that "All in all, The Barbarians are excellent beginning war games. They are also pretty good as short fill-in games."

In Issue 50 of the British wargaming magazine Perfidious Albion, Charles Vasey called this "A truly silly set of games this ... In complexity it is simple but has some neat twists. What seems to be the problem is the lack of balance." Vasey concluded, "More abstract game than history, pretty ace if you feel like hurting people smaller than yourself. You'll love it ya wimps! (Good game for novices)."

In Issue 36 of Phoenix (March–April 1982), Paul King was impressed with the quality of the components of the two included games. He liked the automatic balance of Sack of Rome, since although the fall of Rome was inevitable, playing two back-to-back games gave both players an opportunity to win. He found Mongol to be severely unbalanced in favor of the Mongol player saying, "I have rarely seen the Mongols fail to [win], often winning by mid-game in some cases. Although he was troubled by a lack of historical accuracy in either game, he concluded "The Barbarians provides us with two easy to play games, but lacking in true historicity [...] At the same time, I must recommend this offering from Yaquinto for the beginner, the young player and as a handy beer and pretzels game for everyone else."

== Reviews ==
- Adventure Gaming #2
