= James M. Day =

American game designer

James M. Day is an American game designer best known for military based board games, computer games, card games, and miniature rules. He is also a historian and military weaponry subject matter expert.

His first published title was the board game Panzer from Yaquinto Publications in 1979. This was followed by the board games 88 and Armor from the same publisher.

After leaving a career in healthcare administration, Day spent eight years in the computer gaming industry (1990-1998). Six of those years were spent as a game designer and producer for MicroProse Software, during which he was responsible for the games Gunship 2000, Gunship 2000: Islands & Ice, F-15 Strike Eagle III, and Across the Rhine.

Day continued to contribute to a number of game and historical publications, as well as designed the board games MBT and IDF for the Avalon Hill Company and wrote the user manual for Jane's F/A-18.

Day returned to his original interest in miniatures designing the Panzer Miniatures Rules for StrikeNet Games. The card game The Kaiser’s Pirates was published in 2007 for StrikeNet Games—included in Games Magazine's top 100 for 2008. The Kaiser's Pirates was re-published by GMT Games in 2009. It was nominated for a Charles S. Roberts award in 2009.

The World War II tactical combat board game Panzer was published in 2012 by GMT Games. It was nominated for a Charles S. Roberts award in 2013.

It was followed by two expansion sets in 2012, Panzer Expansion#1: The Shape of Battle - The Eastern Front and Panzer Expansion#2: The Final Forces on the Eastern Front. The third expansion set followed in 2014, Panzer Expansion#3: Drive to the Rhine - The 2nd Front. Panzer Expansion #1 was nominated for a Charles S. Roberts award in 2013. The fourth expansion, Panzer Expansion#4: France 1940 was released in 2018.

Day moved from tank oriented games in designing the American Civil War tactical naval game Iron & Oak. It was published in 2013 by GMT Games.

Day designed a new version of the modern tactical combat board game MBT in 2016; its three companion expansions FRG and BAOR were released in 2018, followed by 4CMBG in 2019 by GMT Games.

A stand-alone World War II tactical combat board game Panzer North Africa was released in January 2024. The game subsequently won three 2024 Charles S. Roberts awards, including Game of the Year, Best World War II Game, and Best Tactical Game.
