= Murfreesboro (wargame) =

1979 American Civil War board wargame

- Designers: Richard Berg
- Illustrators: Stephen Peek
- Publishers: Yaquinto Publications
- Publication: 1979
- Genres: American Civil War

Murfreesboro, subtitled "A Game of the Battle of Stones River, December 31, 1862", is a board wargame published by Yaquinto Publications in 1979 that simulates the first day of the Battle of Stones River during the American Civil War.

== Background ==
In late 1862, Confederate general Braxton Bragg withdrew the Army of Mississippi from Kentucky In Tennessee, joined with General Edmund Kirby Smith's Army of Kentucky to form the Army of Tennessee, and took up a defensive position on Stone's Creek, just outside Murfreesboro. President Abraham Lincoln, having grown tired of the passivity of Union General Don Carlos Buell, commander of the Army of the Cumberland, replaced him with General William Rosecrans, and ordered Rosecrans to find and engage Bragg's Confederate army. Rosecrans found Bragg's army near Murfreesboro late in December 1862, and on the last day of the year, the two armies met in battle.

== Description ==
Murfreesboro is a two-player game where one player controls Union forces and the other player controls Confederate forces. The 21" x 27" hex grid map is scaled at 225 yards (206 m) per hex. The game uses an alternating "I Go, You Go" system, where the first player follows the sequence:

1. Attempt to Rally disrupted units.
2. Move
3. (Inactive player): Defensive ranged fire
4. Offensive ranged fire
5. Assault

The other player has the same opportunities, completing one game turn, representing 40 minutes of the battle.

An unusual detail is that infantry brigades are presented as rectangular counters that take up two hexes, representing two separate but physically connected units. Thus the units must move together; when marching as a column, the counter is moved with the narrow end at the front, and when in battle line, the long side is the front. Damage to the two units is tracked separately; when one side of the double unit is brought to zero, the large double counter is replaced by a single counter representing the surviving unit. Critic Steve List called this the "salient feature of the game [that] graphically captures the problems of handling large bodies of troops."

Leadership also plays an important part of the game: any unit more than six hexes from its commanding officer cannot move or attack.

== Publication history ==
Richard Berg, well-known in the wargaming industry for his large and complex Gettysburg wargame Terrible Swift Sword (SPI, 1976), designed a considerably less complex game based on what Union historians called the "Battle of Stones Creek" and what Confederate historians called the "Second Battle of Murfreesboro". Charles Vasey noted the uncharacteristic lack of complexity, and lack of extra and variant rules known as 'chrome', saying, "for a Berg game, it is so chrome-less that one notices it right away." In 1979, Yaquinto simultaneously introduced their first eight games at Gencon XII, including Murfreesboro.

== Reception ==
In Issue 46 of the British wargaming magazine Perfidious Albion, Charles Vasey noted that much emphasis was placed on facing and fatigue. Vasey also pointed out that, unlike other games by Richard Berg, the rules were not complex, being "much shorter than ... Terrible Swift Sword." Despite this, Vasey was ambiguous about the game, finding it "hard to judge."

In Issue 54 of Moves, Steve List thought this game featured an "interesting system", but found some annoying peculiarities in the rules, using as an example that infantry, while in combat line, cannot move forward across a creek, but can cross the creek while moving backwards. List put this down to "insufficient development, proofreading or both" and gave the game a grade of "B– ".

== Other reviews and commentary ==
- Fire & Movement #26
