= Timeship (role-playing game) =

Tabletop science fiction role-playing game

Cover art by C.A. Millan

Timeship is a role-playing game published by Yaquinto Publications in 1983 in which the players role-play themselves as time-travellers. It is now published by Precis Intermedia.

== Description ==
Timeship is a time-travel role-playing system with very general rules. Unlike other roleplaying games where the players create fictional characters, in Timeship, players role-play themselves as they are teleported by a powerful ritual in an ancient scroll into the past or the future. At a time when role-playing game systems were becoming increasingly complex, Timeship was an attempt to simplify and streamline the rules. The entire rules system takes up only ten pages in a 48-page booklet.

Other game components include a gamemaster's screen, two ten-sided dice, and a pad of character record sheets.

Three scenarios take up most of the rules booklet:

- "Murder at the End of Time": The players encounter simulacra of Dracula and Little Red Riding Hood
- "Destruction of Gomorrah": The players are transported to Gomorrah, where they free slaves and sacrificial victims and try to deactivate the device that will destroy the city
- "Assassinate the Fuhrer.": The players are transported to Berlin in April 1945, and must locate the Führerbunker where Adolf Hitler is hiding and ensure his demise.

== Publication history ==
Timeship, the last roleplaying game published by Yaquinto Publications, was designed by Herbie Brennan, with cover art by C.A. Millan and interior art by Johnny Robinson.

== Reception ==
In the December 1983 edition of Dragon (Issue 80), Ken Rolston was guardedly enthusiastic about Timeship. Roslton admired the simplification of the rules system, and the ambitious nature of a game that attempted to cover all of past and future time. However, he sometimes found the humorous tone in the rulebook "is often irritatingly cute and self-indulgent, and the rules of play themselves are difficult to read and reference because of the idiosyncratic style." Rolston thought the first scenario, "Murder at the End of Time", to be "pretty silly", but found the third scenario set in wartime Berlin to be "the most detailed and credible", although he faulted writer Herbie Brennan for not including a bibliography of references about wartime Berlin that a gamesmaster could use to flesh out the scant details provided. Rolston concluded by recommending the game, saying, "First, it is a distinctive example of simpler, rather than more complex, FRP game mechanics. Second, the central idea of the game, time travel, is marvelously fertile soil for FRP gaming, and this is the first game to attempt to cultivate it. Finally, I believe this game may be more accessible to those not already addicted to games."

In Issue 33 of Different Worlds, Ian Beste noted "Unfortunately one of its basic assumptions, that players play themselves and not some arbitrarily rolled-up character, only weakens the game." Beste also asked "why are the rules so poorly organized, with some of the basic concepts of personal energy written in a pretentious 'ancient' style?" Beste also thought that the amount of historical research that the "Timelord" (gamemaster) would need to do to prepare an adventure was onerous, and the lack of rules would add to the Timelord's workload. Given all these problems, Beste recommended this as an add-on for another game system, pointing out, "Probably the best use of Timeship can be made by gamers who like to 'tinker' with game systems. Timeship can be a useful device for transporting characters between campaigns. An inventive gamemaster could fit a 'Time Patrol' into an ongoing Space Opera, Traveller, Star Frontiers, or Champions campaign. Time travel could also explain how those champions suddenly popped into your Stormbringer game." Beste concluded with a guarded recommendation, saying, "Its approach to role-playing follows the idea of minimum rules, maximum fun. It suffers from poor organization, incomplete rules, and too much self-advertisement. Yet, the subject is unique, and can be added to other games with a little work. The three Time Capsules included are interesting and fun, and Yaquinto can only add to the game's appeal by producing more. Timeship may not be exactly what you are looking for, but it is worth looking at."

In the August 1984 edition of Space Gamer (Issue No. 70) William A. Barton found the rules badly organized, and not enough historical material included. "As much as I enjoy time travel and would like to role-play such journeys into the past and future, I can hardly recommend Timeship. Unless you're prepared to do a lot of work rewriting and making up rules, you're best off waiting for someone else to take a shot at a time travel RPG."

In his 1990 book The Complete Guide to Role-Playing Games, game critic Rick Swan was very disappointed in this game, calling it "more of an outline than a fully developed game ... the game mechanics are woefully underdeveloped." Although Swan did not object to the idea of using the players as their own characters, he noted that "there aren't any comprehensible instructions for doing so." He also commented that "The game's conception of time travel is never made clear. Can past events be changed, or are they unalterable?" Swan concluded by giving this game a dismal rating of only 1 out of 4, saying, "Who cares? Skip it."

Nearly a decade after the publication of Timeship, Lawrence Schick, in his 1991 retrospective book Heroic Worlds: A History and Guide to Role-Playing Games, called the game an "attempt to cover every historical possibility with maximum flexibility – an ambitious goal that is not quite achieved".

== Reviews ==
- Analog Science Fiction and Fact
