= Grailquest =

Series of gamebooks by J. H. Brennan

GrailQuest
- The Castle of Darkness (1984); The Den of Dragons (1984); The Gateway of Doom (1984); Voyage of Terror (1985); Kingdom of Horror (1985); Realm of Chaos (1986); Tomb of Nightmares (1986); Legion of the Dead (1987)
- Author: J. H. Brennan
- Illustrator: John Higgins
- Language: English
- Genre: Fantasy
- Publisher: Armada (UK); Dell (US)
- Published: 1984 - 87
- Media type: Print
- No. of books: 8

GrailQuest is a series of gamebooks by J. H. Brennan. The books are illustrated by John Higgins. The stories follow the adventures of a young hero named Pip, who is often called upon by Merlin to right wrongs and save the realm from evil. The series is light in tone and does not take itself seriously, often spoofing the fantasy genre and inserting slapstick humour or nonsensical elements.

== Titles ==
1. The Castle of Darkness (1984)
2. The Den of Dragons (1984)
3. The Gateway of Doom (1984)
4. Voyage of Terror (1985)
5. Kingdom of Horror (1985)
6. Realm of Chaos (1986)
7. Tomb of Nightmares (1986)
8. Legion of the Dead (1987)

The series is mostly set in the realm of Avalon, although the fourth volume, Voyage of Terror, takes place almost entirely in ancient Greece, after Merlin's summoning spell goes wrong. While there were eight total books published in the series, books seven and eight were never published in the United States.

== Characters ==
- Pip: The hero of the series. Pip was brought up on a farm as the adopted child of Freeman John and his wife Miriam. One day, soldiers from King Arthur's court arrived to escort Pip to Merlin's log castle, where Merlin assigned the young adventurer the mission of rescuing Queen Guinevere from the evil Wizard Ansalom. Pip fights (and sometimes argues) with a speaking magical sword, Excalibur Junior, and often wears a sturdy dragonhide jacket when adventuring. Pip is never assigned a gender pronoun by anyone in the books and as such could be a female hero, though the assumption is usually taken that Pip is a young boy. Pip does declare himself lord of the jungle at one point, and EJ, referring to Pip, says "unhand him, varlet!".
- Merlin: The (supposedly) wise old wizard. He introduces each adventure and is usually the one who gives Pip his mission, providing Pip with items and some magic. Merlin tends to be sarcastic and grumpy, not to mention eccentric. However, even though he treats Pip like a foolish child, he still cares about the young adventurer. In one of the series' running jokes, Merlin acquires a new, bizarre home in every volume. Merlin's eccentricities are showcased in each book with Merlin acquiring a new dwelling, more bizarre and off-the-wall than the last. In Castle of Darkness, Merlin lives in a log castle. He's moved to a crystal cave in Den of Dragons. By Gateway of Doom, he has moved into the lightning-blasted remains of an ancient druid oak. Voyage of Terror shows Merlin trying out a magical bubble spell which places a home of sorts at the bottom of the well in the town square of Glastonbury Village. In Kingdom of Horror he has created a home in the shape of a large six-sided die up in the Welsh Mountains. Realm of Chaos actually showcases two of Merlin's homes: the first being the enormous barrel-shaped house he is living in at the beginning, and the second one being a sort of abandoned fortress in the Astral Plane. Tomb of Nightmares has Merlin living inside a hollowed-out roc egg, presented to King Arthur by a drunken Arab sailor and given to the wizard when the King had no other idea of what to do with it. Only the final book in the series omits specific details about Merlin's home, though wherever it stands, there is a one-way door out of it which leads into Hell.
- Cody: Merlin's young apprentice, introduced in Legion of the Dead, who brings Pip to Avalon via the Net Spell after Merlin disappears and is presumed dead following a fall from a tree.
- Excalibur Junior (E.J.): Pip's magical talking sword. It was created by Merlin, who based its design on King Arthur's sword (hence the "Junior"). E.J. is quite powerful but has the annoying tendency of speaking its mind at inconvenient times, and can even refuse to be pulled from its scabbard (showing an ability similar to its namesake) when in a bad mood. E.J. also suffers from arachnophobia, which is a disadvantage when Pip runs into giant spiders.
- The Poetic Fiend: A vampire poet who is a recurring character through the series. The Fiend believes that he is a great poet, when in actuality his verse tends more towards doggerel (and has been known to make even cockroaches throw up when he gives a recital). He is often helpful to Pip, as long as Pip is diplomatic in his criticism of the Fiend's poetry. In the English-language books, the Fiend is unnamed. In the French translations, however, he is known as Nosferax.
- King Arthur: Ruler of the realm of Avalon. He is rarely encountered by the player in person, but is a prominent and influential figure in the series. He is usually the one who gives missions to Pip by the way of Merlin.
- King Pellinore: King Pellinore of Listinoise appears in the first few books as a running gag, where he is often confused for the Black Knight because of his dark armour. Often it is Pellinore who is assigned the task of taking care of whatever problem is plaguing Camelot, with Pip only coming in later after the poor old king gets himself hopelessly lost.
- The Wizard Ansalom: An evil black-magic-using wizard, who is the main villain in the very first adventure. He returns as a ghost when Pip visits the Ghastly Kingdom of the Dead and Pip discovers that some of his dark influence remains in the last volume.
- The Black Knight: The Black Knight of old legend is the main villain in one of Pip's adventures. He seems to appear in several volumes, but those other appearances are actually King Pellinore (see above).

== Rules ==
The rules of GrailQuest are quite simple when compared to most RPGs. The player must roll two six-sided dice and add the results. If the result exceeds 6 (which will happen 58.3% of the time), then the enemy is injured and loses a number of Life Points - how much depends on what the dice shows, as every point over 6 will count as a point of damage. When a character's Life Points reach zero, the character is dead, and when they are at 5, they are knocked out.

If wielding a weapon, the number needed to hit may be lower, and extra damage will usually be inflicted. For instance, Excalibur Junior hits on a roll of 4 (hitting 91.7% of the time) and provides a bonus 5 points of damage. There is no defence roll, but damage is reduced by a set amount by any armour the character is wearing.

Initiative is determined by an initial, opposed roll where the highest roll gets the first attack. From then on, the character and the enemy take turns to attack. Surprise is sometimes involved (for example, in Gateway of Doom, a giant spider gets first strike automatically due to Pip being in its home territory).

If the character dies, the player must go to section 14, which describes his afterdeath and tells him to calculate his Life Points again. Merlin then resurrects Pip, who has to start from the beginning of the adventure again - although some books will only require him to start from a certain point; for example, Gateway of Doom allows Pip to restart at the beginning of the Ghastly Kingdom of the Dead, and Realm of Chaos allows him to start from the beginning of a certain location. However, all previously killed enemies remain dead, and any treasure the player found is gone for good. (In some books, killed enemies return to life with half the Life Points they had the first time around.)

== Reception ==
In the inaugural issue of The Games Machine, John Woods thought the books had a "pleasant light-hearted feel." He also noted that Grailquest books required a lot of skill, as opposed to the large element of random chance required in the rival Fighting Fantasy book series. Woods thought that Grailquest should have done as well or even better than Fighting Fantasy, but speculated that perhaps players "preferred the hectic hack-and-slay action of Fighting Fantasy to the more leisurely and lengthy descriptive sections of Grailquest."

== Electronic versions ==
In 2012 the company Tin Man Games planned to create iOS and Android versions of the books.
