= Time War (board game) =

Board game

Time War, subtitled "A Game of Time Travel and Conflict", is a science fiction board wargame published by Yaquinto Publications in 1979.

== Description ==
Time War is a conflict simulation game which takes place over a span of time ranging from 550 million B.C. to 2075 A.D. Players attempt to control the present by altering history.

=== Components ===
- 22" x 28" map
- 400 die-cut counters
- deck of Time Mission cards
- log pad
- two dice
- set of charts
- rule book

== Reception ==
Don Turnbull reviewed Time War for White Dwarf #17, giving it an overall rating of 8 out of 10, and stated that "what I have seen so far indicates to me a workmanlike job, not entirely free of annoying errors and easier to learn than it looks, with plenty of play-potential and enough interest to fascinate players who like to handle a considerable number of variables at once."

Steve List reviewed Time War in Ares Magazine #1, rating it a 7 out of 9. List commented that "Time War is an excellent effort into a heretofore unexplored field, and thus many of its flaws should be excused."

Forrest Johnson reviewed Time War in The Space Gamer No. 38. Johnson commented that "Time War could have been a great game. Maybe it was ... or will be."

In Issue of 26 of Phoenix, Paul King found the game components to be of high quality, and concluded "All in all Time War is a fun game and the playing time of one or two hours is not too far out once you are used to the mechanics."
