= Swashbuckler (board game) =

Board game

Swashbuckler is a 1980 board game published by Yaquinto Publications.

== Gameplay ==
Swashbuckler is a combat game for 2-6 players set in the era of The Three Musketeers. Two maps are included: a tavern and a pirate's ship. Players can choose to be musketeers that are wielding rapiers, or pirates with sabres.

In addition to counters for each character, there are also counters for tables, chairs, mugs, chandeliers, carpets, treasure chests, and cannons. The rules include several basic setups. The starting locations and facing of characters are determined randomly.

The game characterizes a free-for-all brawl where the last character standing is the winner. Before each turn, players write down a sequence of six orders for their character that can include movement; throwing mugs or daggers; swinging from the chandelier; various offensive and defensive fencing maneuvers; pulling a carpet or shoving a table (to knock another character prone); or waving a hat (which does no harm but can startle an opponent, forcing them to lose a part of their next sequence).

== Reception ==
Paul Manz reviewed Swashbuckler in The Space Gamer No. 31. Manz commented that "Swashbuckler is a relaxing and enjoyable game. The components are of a high quality [...] it's a worthwhile investment."

In the October 1980 edition of Dragon, Bill Fawcett enjoyed the game immensely, saying, "Swashbuckler is fun. Not silly fun, or inside-joke fun, but just plain pleasant fun. Perhaps dying from a mug in the head is too ludicrous to get upset about, but for some reason this game is even fun to lose... Considering the price, the ease of play and the technical sophistication of this game, Swashbuckler could be one of your best game purchases of the year."

Clayton Miner reviewed Swashbuckler for Pegasus magazine and stated that "This is a great game for players to use to become familair with Yaquinto's method of setting up rules, and setting up game systems without spending a large amount of money. Swashbuckler is great fun in the tradition of daydreams, and fantasy books, and those films that used to be shown on Saturdays and on the late show. Anyone looking for a simple game that has a good challenge to it, and had outstanding graphics should pick this one up and give it a try."

== Reviews ==
- 1980 Games 100 in Games
- Jeux & Stratégie #13
