= The Ironclads =

Board game

Box cover of the 1st edition, 1979

The Ironclads, subtitled "A Tactical Level Game of Naval Combat in the American Civil War 1861–1865", is a board wargame published by Yaquinto Publications in 1979 that simulates American Civil War naval combat.

== Gameplay ==
The Ironclads is a game that simulates naval warfare between ironclads during the American Civil War, such as the 1862 Battle of the Monitor and Merrimack. Each ship in the game has its own unique blend of armament and armor. Most scenarios are presented as a two-ship combat, although one scenario is a solitaire game, and several present multiplayer fleet engagements. Most two-player games last about an hour.

=== Components ===
The game comes with:

- 300 die cut unit counters
- 4-piece isomorphic mapboard, 42" x 27.5"
- log pad
- charts and tables
- range indicators
- two six-sided dice
- plastic tray for counters
- 45 double-sided ship specification cards
- rule book

=== Combat ===
Guns on a ship are fired individually, and the result of each is resolved before the next gun is fired.

== Production history ==
The Ironclads, designed by John W. Fuseler, was one of the eight inaugural games published by Yaquinto Games in 1979. Several of Yaquinto's first games suffered from unforeseen problems with the rules, and several like The Ironclads and The Beastlord required Yaquinto to immediately issue a revised second edition rulebook.

The following year, Yaquinto published The Ironclads: Expansion Kit designed by John Fuseler and Jack Greene. The expansion set extended the timeline of battles to 1879, and added ships from European nations, scenarios set in South America and Europe, and optional combat rules.

In 1987, 3W (World Wide Wargames) published Shot & Shell, a rewrite and extension of The Ironclads designed by Roger Nord that could incorporate the original game, or be used as a standalone game.

In 1993, Excalibre Games republished the original game The Ironclads, keeping the rules as-is and only changing the ships' silhouettes on the counters from overhead to sideview.

== Reception ==
In the December 1979 edition of Dragon (Issue #32), Tim Kask called the game "an exciting, accurate simulation of naval warfare during the American Civil War" but commented at length on the problems with the rules: "In terms of coherence, cohesion, completeness and clarity, the rules are the pits. It is obvious that... corners were cut [that] involved editing and proofreading. Ironclad’s rules are rife with misspellings, typos, [and] mistakes... This doesn't really become apparent until you try to play out the introductory scenario. If you follow their lead, you will promptly proceed to run aground." However, Kask believed "the fact it manages transcend these problems is tribute to the soundness of design." Kask highly recommended Ironclads, branding it "one of the best releases of the year."

In Issue 28 of Phoenix (November–December 1980), Bob Christian admired most of the components – although he threw away the counter sorting tray, calling it a "worthless addition" — but he, like many players and other reviewers, found the 1st edition rules disappointingly vague in places. He called combat "tedious", and did not like the rule that combat only happened after movement was finished, meaning that often ships were not allowed to fire until they were well past their target. However, he found the game to be entertaining, and concluded, "For many years I've waited for a simulation like The Ironclads and I cannot say I'm disappointed." He strongly recommended players wait until the second edition rules were available.

In Issue 54 of Moves, Steve List warned that this game was "a forest of charts — 22 of them" and that "The undergrowth in this forest is the record keeping." Even though List was reviewing the 1980 "revised edition", he noted that "the rules still contain some annoying errors." He concluded by giving the game a B+ and the expansion set of cards a B−, saying, "For those who enjoy (or at least tolerate) the detail with which the subject is treated, it is certainly rewarding if a bit flawed. For those with beer and pretzels at hand, find something else."

== Awards ==
At the 1980 Origins Awards, The Ironclads was awarded the Charles S. Roberts Award for "Best Initial Release of 1979".

In 1988, the game extension Shot & Shell by 3W was awarded the Charles S. Roberts Award for the new category "Best Pre-World War II Board Game".

== Other reviews ==
- Moves #49, p 4-6
- Strategy & Tactics #79
- Moves #54, p6-7 (The Ironclads Expansion Kit)
- Perfidious Albion #42 (p12)
