= James Herbert Brennan =

Irish writer (1940–2024)

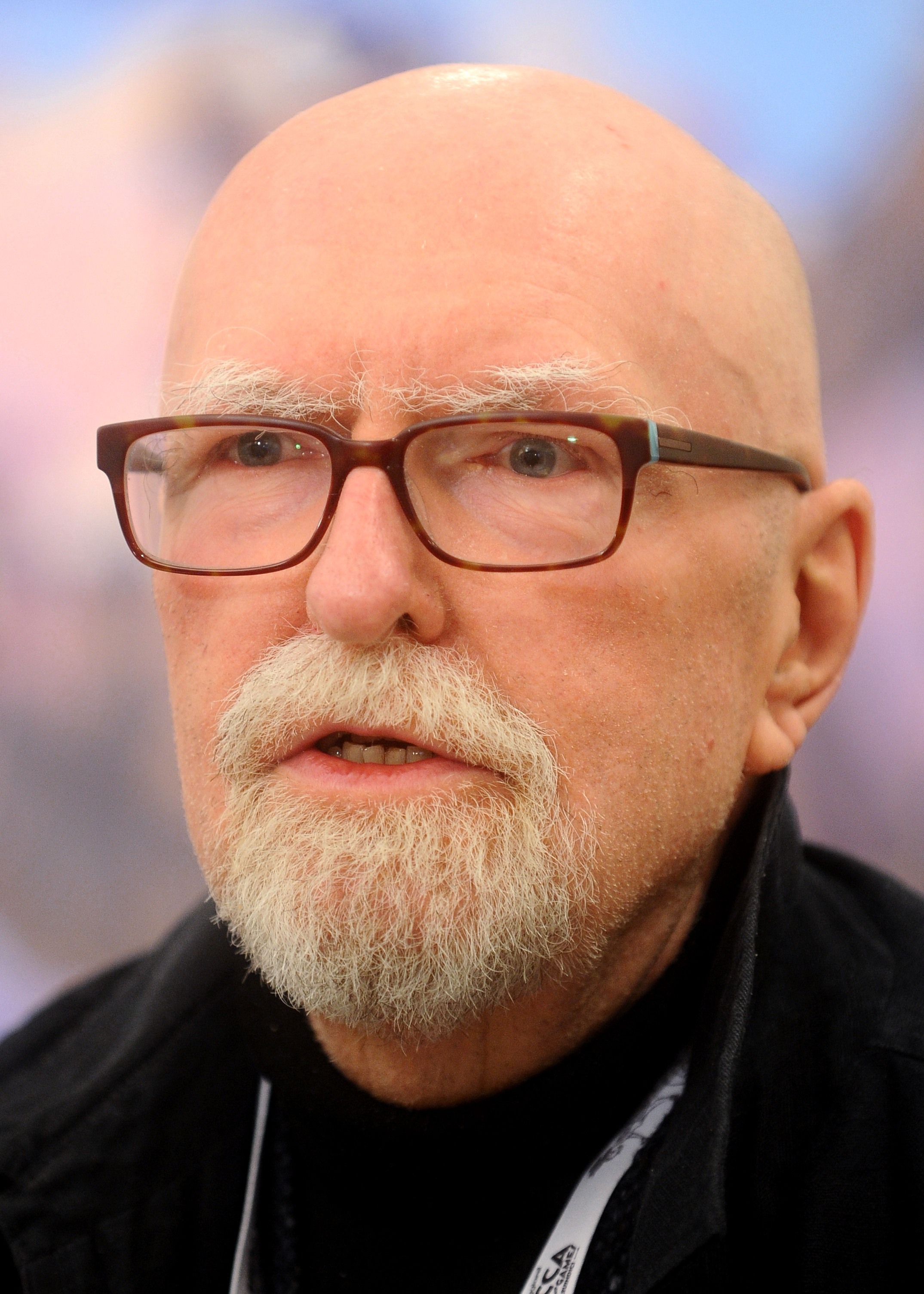
- Brennan at Lucca Comics & Games, 2015
- Born: 5 July 1940; Gilford, Northern Ireland
- Died: 1 January 2024 (aged 83); Tullow, County Carlow, Ireland
- Other names: Herbie Brennan, J. H. Brennan
- Citizenship: Ireland
- Occupation: Author

James Herbert Brennan (5 July 1940 – 1 January 2024) was an Irish lecturer and the author of over 100 fiction and non-fiction books for adults, teens and children, as well as several role-playing games.

== Early life ==
Brennan was born to grocers James and Sarah Brennan and grew up in Gilford, Northern Ireland. He became interested in mysticism at an early age, an interest that would remain with him the rest of his life. At age 18, he became a journalist with the Belfast Telegraph. In the 1960s, he moved to Dublin to become the editor of a weekly magazine titled Scene.

== Author ==
In keeping with his growing interest in spirituality, Brennan offered spiritual counseling and hypnotherapy, and also turned his hand to writing. His first book, Astral Doorways: Techniques for Experiencing the Boundless Possibilities of the Astral Plane was published by HarperCollins in 1980 using his pen name H.J. Brennan.

== Role-playing games ==
Brennan became interested in the fantasy role-playing game Dungeons & Dragons when it appeared in the mid-1970s, and developed what the Irish Examiner would later call an obsession for the game. Brennan started to create his own Roman-themed role-playing game called Arena. However, the longer he worked on it, the more historical territory the game covered. When Yaquinto Publications published his finished product in 1982, Man, Myth & Magic drew on myths and legends from 4000 BCE to 400 CE. In his 2014 book Designers & Dragons: The 80s, game historian Shannon Appelcline noted that this game was noteworthy as "the earliest notable RPG to really take a solid look at historical roleplaying." Applecline also pointed out that Man, Myth, & Magic was "one of the earliest RPGs to provide truly serialized adventures" and that "Man, Myth & Magic went further, providing tighter connections between adventures, and even cliffhangers at the end of each supplement."

Brennan followed this with another Yaquinto RPG, Timeship (1983), in which the players play themselves as time travellers. Notably, this was the last role-playing game published by Yaquinto before it went out of business.

Brennan also created a horror role-playing game, The Monster Horrorshow (1987).

== Grailquest ==
In 1982, Steve Jackson and Ian Livingstone created The Warlock of Firetop Mountain, a fantasy adventure book in which the reader chooses their own path through the book by making choices at certain times, and fighting monsters using dice. Brennan was fascinated by the concept, and approached HarperCollins about writing a trilogy of three books called Grailquest in which a young boy called Pip is given various quests by the wizard Merlin. HarperCollins agreed to publish the series, which proved to be enormously popular. Brennan ended up writing eight books in the series, which sold 6.5 million copies.

Brennan wrote a number of other adventure gamebooks outside of the Grailquest series, including two published only in French – Aztec Quest (1997) and Egyptian Quest (1997).

== The Faerie Wars Chronicles ==
In 2003, using the pen name "Herbie Brennan", he created a fantasy action novel for young adults titled Faerie Wars, and it proved very popular, reaching number 4 on the New York Times best seller list for paperback children's books.

In all, Brennan wrote five books in The Faerie Wars Chronicles, which sold a combined 7.5 million copies.

== Other books ==
Brennan also authored numerous other books covering many subjects including history, the occult, New Age, self-improvement, parapsychology, and several romance novels.

In 1995 he contributed two novels to the Horrorscopes novel series under the house pen name "Maria Palmer". In 1998 he published Martian Genesis an ancient astronaut book which claimed the human race is of extraterrestrial origin.

In 2003, Brennan published the children's book The Book of Wizardry: The Apprentice's Guide to the Secrets of the Wizards' Guild under the pseudonym "Cornelius Rumstuckle." The book purports to instruct children on how to become a wizard; it discusses crafts such as making a wand, and includes astrological references throughout. According to the biographical note on the back cover, Rumstuckle "joined the Wizards' Guild in 1514 and became its youngest president ever seventy-eight years later, a post he holds to this day."

In 2011 Herbie Brennan's book The Secret History of Ancient Egypt was republished by Bedford Square Books.

In all, Brennan wrote more than 100 books, which were translated into 50 languages.

== Personal life ==
Brennan married Helen McMaster in 1961 and they had two children before divorcing in 1991. Brennan married artist and author Jacquie Burgess in 1993. In 2007, he received a Master's degree from Exeter University; his thesis was about Western esotericism.

In 2019, Brennan was diagnosed with Parkinson's disease, which cut down on his daily output of writing. As he described to the Irish Examiner, "I used to write 2,000 words a day, day in day out. I can remember one good day when I wrote 10,000 words. Now I'm very lucky if I can write more than 500. It drives me mad. I'm very slow writing now." Brennan died on 1 January 2024, age 83.

== Bibliography ==
=== Role Playing Games ===
- Man, Myth & Magic
- Timeship
- The Monster Horrorshow

=== Gamebooks ===
- Sagas of the Demonspawn: (Fire* Wolf) (1984)
- Sagas of the Demonspawn: (The Crypts of Terror) (1984)
- Sagas of the Demonspawn: (Demondoom) (1985)
- Sagas of the Demonspawn: (Ancient Evil) (1985)
- GrailQuest
- Horror Classic Gamebooks
- Egyptian Quest (1997)

=== Non-fiction ===
- Astral Doorways (1971)
- Five Keys to Past Lives (1972)
- Experimental Magic (1972)
- The Occult Reich (1974)
- An Occult History of the World (1976)
- Getting What You Want (1977)
- Good Con Guide (1978)
- Reincarnation (1981)
- A Guide to Megalithic Ireland (1982)
- Discover Your Past Lives: A Practical Course (1984)
- Mindreach (1985)
- The Reincarnation Workbook: A Complete Course in Recalling Past Lives (1989)
- The Astral Projection Workbook: How to Achieve Out-of-Body Experiences (1989)
- Mindpower : Succeed at School (1990)
- Mindpower: Secrets to Improve Your Image (1990)
- Aquarian Guide to the New Age (1990) (with Eileen Campbell)
- The Young Ghost Hunter's Guide (1990)
- Understanding Reincarnation: Effective Techniques for Investigating Your Past Lives (1990)
- How to Get Where You Want to Go (1991)
- Discover Astral Projection (1991)
- Discover Reincarnation (1992)
- True Ghost Stories (1993)
- The Dictionary of Mind, Body and Spirit (1994) (with Eileen Campbell)
- Body, Mind and Spirit: A Dictionary of New Age Ideas, People, Places, and Terms (1994) (with Eileen Campbell)
- Time Travel: A New Perspective (1997)
- Seriously Weird True Stories (1997)
- “Memory: Change Your Way of Thinking” (1997)
- Magick for Beginners (1998)
- Martian Genesis (1998)
- The Little Book of Nostradamus: Prophecies for the 21st Century (1999)
- The Secret History of Ancient Egypt (2000)
- The Magical I Ching (2000)
- Magical Use of Thought Forms (2001)
- Occult Tibet (2002)
- Death – The Great Mystery of Life (2002)
- Tibetan Magic and Mysticism (2006)
- Whisperers - The Secret History of the Spirit World (2014)

=== The adventures of Barmy Jeffers ===
- Barmy Jeffers and the Quasimodo Walk (1988)
- Return of Barmy Jeffers and the Quasimodo Walk (1988)
- Barmy Jeffers and the Shrinking Potion (1989)

=== Faerie Wars Chronicles ===
1. Faerie Wars (2003)
2. The Purple Emperor (2004)
3. Ruler of the Realm (2006)
4. Faerie Lord (2007)
5. The Faeman Quest (2011)

=== Other fiction ===
- Beyond the Fourth Dimension (1975)
- Power Play (1977)
- Greythorn Woman (1979)
- Dark Moon (1980)
- Mindreach (1985)
- The Curse of Frankenstein (1986)
- Dracula's Castle (1986)
- Monster Horrorshow (1987)
- The Crone (1989)
- Ordeal by Poison (1992)
- Ancient Spirit (1993)
- Marcus Mustard (1994)
- Capricorn: Capricorn's children (1995)
- Cancer: Black Death (1995)
- The Gravediggers (1996)
- Blood brother (1997)
- Kookaburra Dreaming (1997)
- Letters from a Mouse (1997)
- Zartog's Remote (2000)
- Nuff Said: Another Tale of Bluebell Wood (2002)
- In Miss Whitts class.... Being bored... Question mark (2009)
- The Shadow Project (2010)
- The Doomsday Box (2011)
