= Yaquinto Publications =

Board and role-playing game publisher

- Industry: Gaming
- Founded: March 1979
- Defunct: 1983
- Fate: operation discontinued
- Headquarters: Dallas, Texas
- Key people: Steve Peek, Craig Taylor
- Products: The Ironclads, The Sword and The Flame, Man, Myth & Magic
- Parent: Robert Yaquinto Printing

Yaquinto Publications was the wargame publishing arm of the Robert Yaquinto Printing Company of Dallas, Texas.

== History ==
Yaquinto Publications was started by Robert Yaquinto Printing early in the year 1979. In March 1979 Robert Yaquinto hired Steve Peek and Craig Taylor, both experienced wargame designers with several famous titles in their resumes. Peek and Taylor had been previously employed by Battleline Publications, which had been merged into Heritage USA, but when that failed to rush the growth of the company, Peek and Taylor instead helped to form Yaquinto to publish wargames.

Yaquinto brought several innovations to the industry, largely because they operated within a well-established printing company, with its attending expertise. Yaquinto was notable for its use of extra thick cardboard for the counters in its games, making them easier to handle. The most unusual innovation by Yaquinto was their series of Album Games. These games were packaged using the jackets for double vinyl record albums. The jacket often opened to reveal the mapboard printed within, the components contained in the two pockets of the jacket where, in normal use, one would find the vinyl record. Zip closing bags were provided to hold the components of the game. The concept of the album packaging was designed for Yaquinto by Larry Brom, designer of The Sword and The Flame.

While concentrating on wargames for most of its history, the company also branched to the more mainstream areas of board games. For instance, Neck and Neck (a horse-racing game), Market Madness (a stock market game) and a game based on the Dallas television show, were all published by Yaquinto.

Possibly the most successful of Yaquinto's games was The Ironclads, a simulation of combat between the first armored ships (ironclads) in the American Civil War that won the Charles S. Roberts Award for "Best Initial Release of 1979". This game was well regarded in its time.

One of the more distinctive offerings by Yaquinto was Swashbuckler. This game simulated individual combat in the context of either a bar room brawl or a hostile boarding attack on a sailing vessel. A lighter treatment than the typical wargame, it might best be thought of as role-playing in a film as opposed to actually simulating swordplay, as it included player actions such as throwing mugs of beer, swinging on chandeliers, and whiffing a feathered hat in an opponent's face to distract them.

Yaquinto were the first publishers of the highly successful The Sword and The Flame wargame rules.

Yaquinto Publications was also the publisher of early works by game designer James M. Day, specifically titles Panzer, 88, and Armor. Panzer, as well as the rest of these games (that were based on the same game system) both as boardgames and as wargame titles were groundbreaking for their time and led at least in part to the detailed derivatives that produced later computer-based simulations.

In the early 1980s, the company attempted to expand into the then-lucrative role-playing games market, releasing three products: Man, Myth & Magic (1982), a Roman-themed fantasy RPG, Pirates & Plunder (1982), a pirate RPG, and Timeship (1983), a Time travel RPG.

In 1979, the impact of personal computers on simulation gaming was too far over the horizon for the founders to see how quickly the market would shift against this style of gaming. Along with several other companies started at that time, Yaquinto only survived a handful of years. By 1983 it had closed its doors, though the printing company continued, being acquired by Cartamundi in 2006.

In 2018, Precis Intermedia acquired the rights to Man, Myth & Magic and Timeship.

== Board games ==
=== 1979 ===
- Battle
- C.V.
- The Great Redoubt
- Marine: 2002
- Murfreesboro
- Panzer
- Starfall
- Sword and the Flame
- The Beastlord
- The Ironclads
- The Thin Red Line
- Time War
- Ultimatum

=== 1980 ===
- 88
- Armor
- Attack of the Mutants!
- Beachhead
- Dallas: A Game of the Ewing Family
- Fast Attack Boats
- Hero
- Mythology
- Pickett's Charge
- Shooting Stars
- Swashbuckler

=== 1981 ===
- Adventurer
- Apache
- Asteroid Pirates
- Battles & Leaders
- Commando Actions
- Demon's Run
- The Fall of South Vietnam
- Market Madness
- Neck and Neck
- Raider!
- Roaring 20's
- Superiority
- The Barbarians
- Wings: A Game of Plane to Plane Combat in World War I

=== 1982 ===
- Bomber
- French Foreign Legion
- United Nations

=== 1983 ===
- Close Assault
- Red Storm

== Role-playing games ==
- Man, Myth & Magic (1982)
- Pirates and Plunder (1982)
- Timeship (1983)
